= 2023 Clube do Remo season =

2023 season of Brazilian association football team

Remo
2023 season
- President: Fábio Bentes
- Head coach: Marcelo Cabo (until 23 May 2023); Ricardo Catalá
- Stadium: Baenão; Mangueirão
- Campeonato Brasileiro Série C: 11th
- Campeonato Paraense: 2nd
- Copa do Brasil: Third round
- Copa Verde: Semi-finals
- Highest home attendance: 42,599 (vs. Corinthians, 12 April 2023)
- Lowest home attendance: 2,080 (vs. Altos, 26 August 2023)
| Home colors | Away colors | Third colors |

The 2023 season was the 110th in Remo's existence. This season Remo participated in the Campeonato Brasileiro Série C, the Campeonato Paraense, the Copa do Brasil and the Copa Verde.

Remo finished the Campeonato Brasileiro Série C in the 11th place, missing out on the top eight places that would advance to the second stage and consequently failing to promotion to Série B of the following year. The club finished runners-up in the Campeonato Paraense after drawing 2–2 on aggregate against Águia de Marabá and losing 5–4 on penalties. In the cups, Remo were knocked out of the Copa do Brasil in the third round by Corinthians after drawing 2–2 on aggregate and losing 5–4 on penalties. In the Copa Verde, they were eliminated in the semi-finals by Paysandu after drawing 2–2 on aggregate and losing 4–2 on penalties.

== Players ==
=== Squad information ===
As of 26 August 2023

Notes:

- Numbers in parentheses denote appearances as substitute.
- Y – Youth players to have featured in a first-team appearance for Remo.

| Squad Number | Position | Nat. | Name | Date of Birth (Age) | | |
| Squad Number | Position | Nat. | Name | Date of Birth (Age) | Apps | Goals |
| 1 | GK | BRA | Vinícius | 9 November 1984 (aged 38) | 38 | 0 |
| 2 | DF | BRA | Lucas Mendes | 28 February 1991 (aged 32) | 23 (7) | 1 |
| 3 | DF | BRA | Diego Guerra | 6 November 1990 (aged 32) | 33 | 0 |
| 4 | MF | BRA | Anderson Uchôa | 4 February 1991 (aged 32) | 28 (1) | 0 |
| 6 | DF | BRA | Leonan | 28 October 1995 (aged 27) | 14 (8) | 1 |
| 7 | FW | BRA | Jean Silva | 7 March 1989 (aged 34) | 18 (13) | 4 |
| 9 | FW | BRA | Élton | 1 August 1985 (aged 38) | 2 (6) | 3 |
| 10 | FW | BRA | Muriqui | 16 June 1986 (aged 37) | 32 | 12 |
| 11 | MF | BRA | Rodriguinho | 24 November 1987 (aged 35) | 16 (11) | 2 |
| 12 | GK | BRA | Victor Lube | 5 February 1994 (aged 29) | 1 | 0 |
| 13 | DF | BRA | Wendel Lomar | 27 May 1996 (aged 27) | 6 (4) | 0 |
| 14 | DF | BRA | Diego Ivo | 6 April 1989 (aged 34) | 22 (7) | 1 |
| 15 | FW | BRA | Ronald | 10 August 2002 (aged 21) | 2 (19) | 2 |
| 16 | MF | BRA | Paulinho Curuá | 11 May 1997 (aged 26) | 11 (13) | 0 |
| 17 | FW | BRA | Renanzinho | 26 May 2001 (aged 22) | 4 (2) | 1 |
| 18 | MF | PAR | Richard Franco | 16 July 1992 (aged 31) | 21 (7) | 5 |
| 19 | MF | BRA | Felipinho (Y) | 19 August 2003 (aged 20) | 0 (1) | 0 |
| 23 | DF | BRA | Jonílson (Y) | 18 January 2002 (aged 21) | 0 (2) | 1 |
| 25 | MF | BRA | Matheus Galdezani | 13 March 1992 (aged 31) | 5 (2) | 0 |
| 28 | MF | BRA | Renan Tiago (Y) | 1 April 2002 (aged 21) | 0 (2) | 0 |
| 29 | FW | BRA | Kanu (Y) | 24 April 2003 (aged 20) | 3 (8) | 3 |
| 30 | MF | BRA | Guty (Y) | 26 June 2003 (aged 20) | 1 (2) | 0 |
| 31 | MF | BRA | Laranjeira | 15 March 2000 (aged 23) | 0 (2) | 0 |
| 40 | MF | BRA | Marcelo | 24 June 1988 (aged 35) | 4 (2) | 0 |
| 52 | DF | BRA | Lucas Marques | 10 June 1998 (aged 25) | 17 (3) | 0 |
| 56 | MF | BRA | Henrique (Y) | 20 January 2002 (aged 21) | 1 (4) | 0 |
| 60 | MF | BRA | Gustavo Bochecha | 8 June 1996 (aged 27) | 2 (4) | 1 |
| 66 | DF | BRA | Kevin | 14 March 2000 (aged 23) | 8 (3) | 1 |
| 77 | FW | BRA | Fabinho | 31 October 1995 (aged 27) | 13 (16) | 9 |
| 87 | MF | BRA | Álvaro | 19 July 1993 (aged 30) | 2 (9) | 0 |
| 89 | FW | BRA | Ricardinho (Y) | 9 June 2002 (aged 21) | 2 (1) | 0 |
| 95 | GK | BRA | Zé Carlos | 11 February 1995 (aged 28) | 3 | 0 |
| 97 | DF | BRA | Evandro | 6 January 1997 (aged 26) | 7 (1) | 0 |
| 98 | FW | BRA | Pedro Vitor | 20 March 1998 (aged 25) | 23 (6) | 5 |
| 99 | FW | BRA | Vitor Leque | 19 January 2001 (aged 22) | 0 (4) | 0 |
Players left the club during the playing season
| 5 | MF | BRA | Pingo | 29 December 2001 (aged 21) | 2 (7) | 0 |
| 8 | MF | BRA | Pablo Roberto | 14 November 1999 (aged 23) | 27 (3) | 1 |
| 17 | FW | BRA | Rogério | 24 December 1990 (aged 32) | 2 (2) | 0 |
| 17 | FW | BRA | Rafael Silva | 26 May 1995 (aged 28) | 1 | 0 |
| 20 | MF | BRA | Soares | 30 September 1997 (aged 25) | 5 (2) | 2 |
| 26 | DF | BRA | Raí | 28 March 2000 (aged 23) | 11 (5) | 1 |
| 27 | FW | BRA | Diego Tavares | 6 July 1991 (aged 31) | 12 (5) | 0 |
| 44 | DF | BRA | Ícaro | 5 August 1993 (aged 30) | 24 | 4 |
| 54 | DF | BRA | Ely (Y) | 14 March 2002 (aged 21) | 1 (2) | 0 |
| 88 | MF | BRA | Claudinei | 8 October 1988 (aged 34) | 10 (5) | 2 |
| 99 | DF | BRA | Rony | 12 April 2000 (aged 23) | 3 | 0 |
| — | FW | BRA | Thiaguinho | 3 April 1998 (aged 25) | 0 | 0 |

=== Top scorers ===
As of 26 August 2023

| Place | Position | Name | Campeonato Brasileiro Série C | Campeonato Paraense | Copa do Brasil | Copa Verde | Total |
|---|---|---|---|---|---|---|---|
| 1 | FW | Muriqui | 4 | 3 | 2 | 3 | 12 |
| 2 | FW | Fabinho | 1 | 7 | 0 | 1 | 9 |
| 3 | MF | Richard Franco | 1 | 2 | 1 | 1 | 5 |
| 3 | FW | Pedro Vitor | 3 | 2 | 0 | 0 | 5 |
| 5 | DF | Ícaro | 0 | 1 | 1 | 2 | 4 |
| 5 | FW | Jean Silva | 0 | 3 | 0 | 1 | 4 |
| 7 | FW | Élton | 3 | 0 | 0 | 0 | 3 |
| 7 | FW | Kanu | 0 | 3 | 0 | 0 | 3 |
| 9 | MF | Rodriguinho | 1 | 0 | 0 | 1 | 2 |
| 9 | MF | Claudinei | 2 | 0 | 0 | 0 | 2 |
| 9 | MF | Soares | 0 | 2 | 0 | 0 | 2 |
| 9 | FW | Ronald | 0 | 2 | 0 | 0 | 2 |
| 13 | DF | Lucas Mendes | 1 | 0 | 0 | 0 | 1 |
| 13 | DF | Kevin | 1 | 0 | 0 | 0 | 1 |
| 13 | DF | Leonan | 0 | 1 | 0 | 0 | 1 |
| 13 | DF | Raí | 0 | 1 | 0 | 0 | 1 |
| 13 | DF | Diego Ivo | 1 | 0 | 0 | 0 | 1 |
| 13 | DF | Jonílson | 0 | 1 | 0 | 0 | 1 |
| 13 | MF | Gustavo Bochecha | 1 | 0 | 0 | 0 | 1 |
| 13 | MF | Pablo Roberto | 0 | 1 | 0 | 0 | 1 |
| 13 | FW | Renanzinho | 1 | 0 | 0 | 0 | 1 |
| Own goals | | | 0 | 1 | 1 | 0 | 2 |

=== Disciplinary record ===
As of 26 August 2023

| Position | Name | Campeonato Brasileiro Série C | | Campeonato Paraense | | Copa do Brasil | | Copa Verde | | Total | |
| Position | Name | Booked | Sent off (straight red) | Booked | Sent off (straight red) | Booked | Sent off (straight red) | Booked | Sent off (straight red) | Booked | Sent off (straight red) |
| DF | Diego Guerra | 6 | 2 | 3 | 0 | 0 | 0 | 1 | 0 | 10 | 2 |
| MF | Pablo Roberto | 4 | 0 | 5 | 1 | 0 | 0 | 1 | 0 | 10 | 1 |
| DF | Ícaro | 3 | 0 | 2 | 1 | 1 | 0 | 3 | 0 | 9 | 1 |
| MF | Richard Franco | 3 | 0 | 3 | 0 | 2 | 0 | 0 | 1 | 8 | 1 |
| MF | Anderson Uchôa | 3 | 0 | 1 | 1 | 1 | 0 | 2 | 0 | 7 | 1 |
| MF | Paulinho Curuá | 2 | 1 | 2 | 0 | 0 | 0 | 0 | 0 | 4 | 1 |
| FW | Fabinho | 3 | 1 | 1 | 0 | 0 | 0 | 0 | 0 | 4 | 1 |
| DF | Lucas Mendes | 1 | 0 | 1 | 1 | 0 | 0 | 0 | 0 | 2 | 1 |
| MF | Henrique | 0 | 0 | 2 | 1 | 0 | 0 | 0 | 0 | 2 | 1 |
| FW | Diego Tavares | 0 | 0 | 0 | 0 | 0 | 0 | 2 | 1 | 2 | 1 |
| FW | Pedro Vitor | 3 | 0 | 4 | 0 | 0 | 0 | 1 | 0 | 8 | 0 |
| GK | Vinícius | 4 | 0 | 0 | 0 | 2 | 0 | 0 | 0 | 6 | 0 |
| DF | Diego Ivo | 3 | 0 | 1 | 0 | 1 | 0 | 0 | 0 | 5 | 0 |
| DF | Lucas Marques | 5 | 0 | 0 | 0 | 0 | 0 | 0 | 0 | 5 | 0 |
| FW | Muriqui | 3 | 0 | 0 | 0 | 2 | 0 | 0 | 0 | 5 | 0 |
| DF | Raí | 0 | 0 | 4 | 0 | 0 | 0 | 0 | 0 | 4 | 0 |
| MF | Rodriguinho | 4 | 0 | 0 | 0 | 0 | 0 | 0 | 0 | 4 | 0 |
| MF | Álvaro | 3 | 0 | 1 | 0 | 0 | 0 | 0 | 0 | 4 | 0 |
| GK | Zé Carlos | 2 | 0 | 1 | 0 | 0 | 0 | 1 | 0 | 4 | 0 |
| DF | Leonan | 1 | 0 | 1 | 0 | 0 | 0 | 1 | 0 | 3 | 0 |
| DF | Kevin | 3 | 0 | 0 | 0 | 0 | 0 | 0 | 0 | 3 | 0 |
| MF | Claudinei | 3 | 0 | 0 | 0 | 0 | 0 | 0 | 0 | 3 | 0 |
| MF | Matheus Galdezani | 1 | 0 | 2 | 0 | 0 | 0 | 0 | 0 | 3 | 0 |
| DF | Evandro | 2 | 0 | 0 | 0 | 0 | 0 | 0 | 0 | 2 | 0 |
| MF | Gustavo Bochecha | 2 | 0 | 0 | 0 | 0 | 0 | 0 | 0 | 2 | 0 |
| MF | Pingo | 0 | 0 | 0 | 0 | 1 | 0 | 1 | 0 | 2 | 0 |
| FW | Renanzinho | 2 | 0 | 0 | 0 | 0 | 0 | 0 | 0 | 2 | 0 |
| DF | Wendel Lomar | 0 | 0 | 1 | 0 | 0 | 0 | 0 | 0 | 1 | 0 |
| DF | Rony | 0 | 0 | 1 | 0 | 0 | 0 | 0 | 0 | 1 | 0 |
| DF | Ely | 0 | 0 | 1 | 0 | 0 | 0 | 0 | 0 | 1 | 0 |
| MF | Marcelo | 1 | 0 | 0 | 0 | 0 | 0 | 0 | 0 | 1 | 0 |
| FW | Rafael Silva | 1 | 0 | 0 | 0 | 0 | 0 | 0 | 0 | 1 | 0 |
| FW | Jean Silva | 1 | 0 | 0 | 0 | 0 | 0 | 0 | 0 | 1 | 0 |
| FW | Ronald | 1 | 0 | 0 | 0 | 0 | 0 | 0 | 0 | 1 | 0 |
| FW | Kanu | 0 | 0 | 1 | 0 | 0 | 0 | 0 | 0 | 1 | 0 |
| | TOTALS | 62 | 3 | 38 | 5 | 10 | 0 | 13 | 2 | 122 | 10 |

== Kit ==
Supplier: Volt Sport / Main sponsor: Banpará

| Home | Home alt. 1 | Away; 2022 | Away alt. 1; 2022 | Away | Third | Third alt. 1 |

== New contracts and transfers ==
=== New contracts ===
| Position | Name | Type | Source |
|---|---|---|---|
| GK | Zé Carlos | Contract extension | |
| GK | Victor Lube | Contract extension | |
| MF | Anderson Uchôa | Contract extension | |
| DF | Leonan | Contract extension | |
| DF | Wendel Lomar | Contract extension | |
| MF | Soares | Contract extension | |

=== Transfers in ===
| Position | Name | From | Type | Source |
|---|---|---|---|---|
| MF | Richard Franco | (Brazil) Náutico | Transfer | |
| DF | Diego Ivo | (Brazil) CRB | Transfer | |
| DF | Lucas Mendes | (Brazil) Operário Ferroviário | Transfer | |
| DF | Ícaro | (Brazil) ABC | Transfer | |
| MF | Pablo Roberto | (Brazil) Vila Nova | Loan | |
| FW | Jean Silva | (Brazil) Figueirense | Transfer | |
| MF | Rodriguinho | (United Arab Emirates) Al Bataeh | Transfer | |
| FW | Diego Tavares | (Brazil) Vila Nova | Transfer | |
| DF | Raí | (Brazil) Fluminense | Transfer | |
| FW | Pedro Vitor | (Brazil) Fortaleza | Loan | |
| FW | Muriqui | (Brazil) Avaí | Transfer | |
| FW | Fabinho | (Brazil) Inter de Santa Maria | Transfer | |
| DF | Diego Guerra | (Brazil) Botafogo-SP | Transfer | |
| FW | Rogério | Free agent | Transfer | |
| MF | Matheus Galdezani | (Brazil) Ferroviária | Transfer | |
| DF | Lucas Marques | (Brazil) Grêmio Prudente | Loan | |
| MF | Álvaro | (Brazil) Ferroviária | Transfer | |
| MF | Laranjeira | (Brazil) Vasco da Gama | Loan | |
| MF | Claudinei | (Brazil) Inter de Limeira | Transfer | |
| MF | Gustavo Bochecha | (Brazil) Coritiba | Loan | |
| DF | Kevin | (Brazil) Audax | Loan | |
| FW | Rafael Silva | (Brazil) Mirassol | Loan | |
| MF | Marcelo | (Brazil) Volta Redonda | Transfer | |
| FW | Élton | Free agent | Transfer | |
| FW | Vitor Leque | (Brazil) Cruzeiro | Loan | |
| DF | Evandro | (Brazil) Águia de Marabá | Transfer | |
| MF | Paulinho Curuá | (Brazil) Tapajós | Transfer | |
| FW | Renanzinho | (Brazil) Guarani | Loan | |
| FW | Thiaguinho | (Brazil) Jacuipense | Loan | |

=== Transfers out ===
| Position | Name | To | Type | Source |
|---|---|---|---|---|
| FW | Tiago Mafra | (Brazil) Cametá | Loan | |
| MF | Pingo | (Brazil) Santa Cruz | Contract terminated | |
| DF | Ely | Free agent | End of contract | |
| MF | Paulinho Curuá | (Brazil) Tapajós | End of loan | |
| FW | Diego Tavares | (Brazil) Brusque | Contract terminated | |
| DF | Raí | (Brazil) Figueirense | Contract terminated | |
| FW | Rogério | (Brazil) CEOV | Contract terminated | |
| MF | Soares | (Brazil) Caxias | Contract terminated | |
| DF | Rony | (Brazil) São Raimundo-PA | Contract terminated | |
| FW | Rafael Silva | (Brazil) Mirassol | Loan return | |
| MF | Pablo Roberto | (Portugal) Casa Pia | Transfer | |
| DF | Ícaro | Free agent | Contract terminated | |
| MF | Claudinei | Free agent | Contract terminated | |
| FW | Thiaguinho | (Brazil) Jacuipense | Loan return | |

Notes

1. Following Soares' release, he later signed for Caxias.
2. Following Rogério's release, he later signed for CEOV.
3. Following Rony's release, he later signed for São Raimundo-PA.

== Competitions ==
| Competition | First match | Last match | Starting round | Final position | Record | | | | | | | |
| Competition | First match | Last match | Starting round | Final position | Pld | W | D | L | GF | GA | GD | Win % |
|---|---|---|---|---|---|---|---|---|---|---|---|---|
| Campeonato Brasileiro Série C | 4 May 2023 | 26 August 2023 | First stage | 11th | 19 | 6 | 7 | 6 | 20 | 18 | +2 | 31.58 |
| Campeonato Paraense | 5 February 2023 | 26 May 2023 | Group stage | 2nd | 14 | 11 | 1 | 2 | 30 | 14 | +16 | 78.57 |
| Copa do Brasil | 23 February 2023 | 26 April 2023 | First round | Third round | 4 | 3 | 0 | 1 | 5 | 3 | +2 | 75.00 |
| Copa Verde | 1 March 2023 | 29 March 2023 | Round of 16 | Semi-finals | 5 | 3 | 0 | 2 | 9 | 4 | +5 | 60.00 |
| Total | | | | | 42 | 23 | 8 | 11 | 64 | 39 | +25 | 54.76 |

Source: Competitions

=== Campeonato Brasileiro Série C ===
Win Draw Loss

==== First stage ====
| Pos | Team | Pld | W | D | L | GF | GA | GD | Pts |
|---|---|---|---|---|---|---|---|---|---|
| 9 | Confiança | 19 | 8 | 4 | 7 | 23 | 26 | −3 | 28 |
| 10 | Náutico | 19 | 6 | 9 | 4 | 25 | 24 | +1 | 27 |
| 11 | Remo | 19 | 6 | 7 | 6 | 20 | 18 | +2 | 25 |
| 12 | CSA | 19 | 5 | 9 | 5 | 15 | 13 | +2 | 24 |
| 13 | Ypiranga | 19 | 6 | 5 | 8 | 26 | 23 | +3 | 23 |

Source: CBF
Rules for classification: 1) points; 2) wins; 3) goal difference; 4) goals scored; 5) fewest red cards; 6) fewest yellow cards; 7) draw.

===== Matches =====
| 4 May 2023 1 | São Bernardo | 3–1 | Remo | São Bernardo do Campo |
| 21:30 UTC−3 | Matheus Oliveira 5'; Hélder (yellow card) 18'; João Carlos 52'; Matheus Salustiano (yellow card) 71'; Léo Jabá 82' | Report | Ícaro (yellow card) 4'; Kevin 90+1' | Stadium: Estádio 1º de Maio; Attendance: 1,415; Referee: Rafael Carlos Salgueiro Lima |

| 7 May 2023 2 | Remo | 1–2 | Botafogo-PB | Belém |
| 19:00 UTC−3 | Franco (yellow card) 43'; Muriqui 44'; Ícaro (yellow card) 49'; Álvaro (yellow card) 84' | Report | Natan Costa (yellow card) 5', (goal) 20'; Marco Antônio (yellow card) 45+2'; Bruno Paraíba (yellow card) 45+7'; Tiago Reis 83'; Bismark (yellow card) 90+4' | Stadium: Mangueirão; Attendance: 12,322; Referee: Douglas Schwengber da Silva |

| 14 May 2023 3 | Remo | 1–2 | Amazonas | Belém |
| 16:30 UTC−3 | Galdezani (yellow card) 46'; Muriqui 53' (pen.); Pedro Vitor (yellow card) 70'; Anderson Uchôa (yellow card) 90+7' | Report | PH (yellow card) 14'; Sassá 31', 47'; Jiménez (yellow card) 45+1'; Renan Castro (yellow card) 51'; Ruan (yellow card) 64'; Vini Locatelli (yellow card) 90+1' | Stadium: Baenão; Attendance: 6,329; Referee: Charly Wendy Straub Deretti |

| 22 May 2023 4 | São José | 2–1 | Remo | Porto Alegre |
| 20:00 UTC−3 | Zé Andrade 12'; Alessandro Vinícius (yellow card) 51'; Nonato (yellow card) 63'; Lucas Cunha (yellow card) 90+1'; Thiago Santos 90+4' | Report | Pablo Roberto (yellow card) 11'; Gustavo Bochecha (yellow card) 51'; Zé Carlos (yellow card) 51'; Muriqui 62'; Lucas Marques (yellow card) 64'; Claudinei (yellow card) 65' | Stadium: Estádio Passo D'Areia; Attendance: 148; Referee: Douglas Marques das Flores |

| 30 May 2023 5 | Remo | 1–0 | Confiança | Belém |
| 20:00 UTC−3 | Pedro Vitor (yellow card) 31', (goal) 63'; Muriqui (yellow card) 44'; Rodriguinho (yellow card) 56'; Álvaro (yellow card) 74'; Claudinei (yellow card) 86'; Diego Ivo (yellow card) 90+4' | Report | Dione (yellow card) 57'; Fábio (yellow card) 70'; Cesinha (yellow card) 72'; Rafael (yellow card) 83' | Stadium: Baenão; Attendance: 5,884; Referee: Luiz Augusto Silveira Tisne |

| 3 June 2023 6 | Brusque | 1–1 | Remo | Brusque |
| 19:00 UTC−3 | Olávio 79'; Luiz Henrique (yellow card) 86'; Diego Tavares (yellow card) 90+4' | Report | Claudinei 17'; Lucas Marques (yellow card) 26'; Vinícius (yellow card) 42'; Álvaro (yellow card) 73'; Gustavo Bochecha (yellow card) 90+6'; Diego Guerra (yellow card) 90+6' | Stadium: Estádio Augusto Bauer; Attendance: 1,902; Referee: Marcos Mateus Pereira |

| 8 June 2023 7 | Remo | 0–0 | América de Natal | Belém |
| 16:30 UTC−3 | Kevin (yellow card) 47' | Report | Gilvan (yellow card) 40'; Gustavo Ramos (yellow card) 48'; Bruno Pianissolla (yellow card) 84' | Stadium: Baenão; Attendance: 11,408; Referee: Thayslane de Melo Costa |

| 11 June 2023 8 | Aparecidense | 0–2 | Remo | Aparecida de Goiânia |
| 16:30 UTC−3 | Alex Henrique (yellow card) 24'; Rafa Marcos (yellow card) 29'; Vanderley (yellow card) 85'; João Diogo (yellow card) 90+5' | Report | Pedro Vitor 4'; Vinícius (yellow card) 45'; Pablo Roberto (yellow card) 47'; Fabinho 64' | Stadium: Estádio Annibal Batista de Toledo; Attendance: 525; Referee: Jonathan Benkenstein Pinheiro |

| 17 June 2023 9 | Pouso Alegre | 0–2 | Remo | Pouso Alegre |
| 16:30 UTC−3 | Rayan (yellow card) 32'; Djalma (yellow card) 45+3'; Igor Pereira (yellow card) 49' | Report | Fabinho (yellow card) 26' (yellow-red card) 38'; Rodriguinho 52'; Muriqui (yellow card) 90+1'; Leonan (yellow card) 90+2'; Diego Guerra (yellow card) 90+6'; Lucas Mendes 90+7'; Jean Silva (yellow card) 90+8' | Stadium: Manduzão; Attendance: 2,582; Referee: Ivan da Silva Guimarães Júnior |

| 24 June 2023 10 | Remo | 1–1 | Figueirense | Belém |
| 16:30 UTC−3 | Pedro Vitor 15'; Ícaro (yellow card) 15'; Pablo Roberto (yellow card) 60'; Rafael Silva (yellow card) 66'; Lucas Marques (yellow card) 68' | Report | Bruno General (yellow card) 43'; Elias (yellow card) 46'; Léo Baiano (yellow card) 62'; Diego Guerra 81' (o.g.) | Stadium: Mangueirão; Attendance: 36,074; Referee: José Ricardo Vasconcellos Laranjeira |

| 2 July 2023 11 | Floresta | 0–0 | Remo | Fortaleza |
| 19:00 UTC−3 | Marllon (yellow card) 2'; Wendel (yellow card) 36' | Report | Fabinho (yellow card) 23'; Pedro Vitor (yellow card) 27'; Zé Carlos (yellow card) 49'; Marcelo (yellow card) 59'; Vinícius (yellow card) 61'; Rodriguinho (yellow card) 75' | Stadium: Estádio Presidente Vargas; Attendance: 451; Referee: Michelangelo Martins de Almeida Júnior |

| 10 July 2023 12 | Remo | 1–2 | Operário Ferroviário | Belém |
| 20:30 UTC−3 | Kevin (yellow card) 7'; Diego Ivo (yellow card) 30'; Lucas Mendes (yellow card) 49'; Élton 83' | Report | Alisson Taddei 37'; Rafael Santos (yellow card) 88'; Felipe Augusto (yellow card) 90', (goal) 90+6' | Stadium: Baenão; Attendance: 11,339; Referee: Rafael Carlos Salgueiro Lima |

| 17 July 2023 13 | Paysandu | 1–0 | Remo | Belém |
| 20:00 UTC−3 | Edílson (yellow card) 2'; Mário Sérgio 34' (pen.); João Vieira (yellow card) 45'; Jacy (yellow card) 52'; Bruno Alves (yellow card) 90+6' | Report | Muriqui (yellow card) 4'; Diego Ivo (yellow card) 36'; Claudinei (yellow card) 72'; Pablo Roberto (yellow card) 90+3'; Evandro (yellow card) 90+7' | Stadium: Mangueirão; Attendance: 27,359; Referee: Vinícius Gonçalves Dias Araújo |

| 23 July 2023 14 | Náutico | 0–0 | Remo | Recife |
| 19:00 UTC−3 | Denílson (yellow card) 43'; Diego Ferreira (yellow card) 90+9' | Report | Anderson Uchôa (yellow card) 34'; Diego Guerra (yellow card) 70' (yellow-red card) 90+8'; Renanzinho (yellow card) 90+1' | Stadium: Estádio dos Aflitos; Attendance: 10,612; Referee: Tiago Ramos de Oliveira |

| 29 July 2023 15 | Remo | 2–1 | Ypiranga | Belém |
| 19:00 UTC−3 | Claudinei 31'; Rodriguinho (yellow card) 34'; Paulinho Curuá (yellow card) 38'; Franco 85' | Report | MV 51'; Avila (yellow card) 63' | Stadium: Mangueirão; Attendance: 8,598; Referee: Ivan da Silva Guimarães Júnior |

| 5 August 2023 16 | Remo | 2–1 | Volta Redonda | Belém |
| 19:00 UTC−3 | Muriqui 10' (pen.); Anderson Uchôa (yellow card) 42'; Diego Ivo 68' | Report | Ítalo 45+1'; Bruno Barra (yellow card) 51'; Caio Vitor (red card) 90+5' | Stadium: Mangueirão; Attendance: 15,895; Referee: Davi de Oliveira Lacerda |

| 13 August 2023 17 | Manaus | 1–1 | Remo | Manaus |
| 16:00 UTC−3 | Thallyson 55'; Andrey (yellow card) 74'; Felipe Baiano (yellow card) 80' | Report | Paulinho Curuá (yellow card) 34'; Diego Guerra (yellow card) 57' (yellow-red card) 90+1'; Lucas Marques (yellow card) 68'; Ronald (yellow card) 70'; Franco (yellow card) 75'; Élton 84'; Rodriguinho (yellow card) 90+1' | Stadium: Estádio Ismael Benigno; Attendance: 2,429; Referee: Emerson Ricardo de Almeida Andrade |

| 20 August 2023 18 | CSA | 0–0 | Remo | Maceió |
| 16:00 UTC−3 | Ednei (yellow card) 22'; Bruno Matias (yellow card) 29' | Report | Lucas Marques (yellow card) 34'; Evandro (yellow card) 72'; Franco (yellow card) 77'; Vinícius (yellow card) 82' | Stadium: Estádio Rei Pelé; Attendance: 8,742; Referee: Wagner Francisco Silva Souza |

| 26 August 2023 19 | Remo | 3–1 | Altos | Belém |
| 16:00 UTC−3 | Élton 33'; Paulinho Curuá (red card) 42'; Kevin (yellow card) 58'; Renanzinho 70', (yellow card) 80'; Gustavo Bochecha 86' | Report | Victor Guilherme 34'; Gabriel Pires (red card) 42'; Palacios (yellow card) 67' | Stadium: Baenão; Attendance: 2,080; Referee: Thaillan Azevedo Gomes |

=== Campeonato Paraense ===
Win Draw Loss

==== Group stage ====
| Pos | Team | Pld | W | D | L | GF | GA | GD | Pts | Qualification or relegation |
|---|---|---|---|---|---|---|---|---|---|---|
| 1 | Remo (A) | 8 | 7 | 0 | 1 | 17 | 8 | +9 | 21 | Advance to the Final stage |
| 2 | Caeté (A) | 8 | 2 | 1 | 5 | 6 | 12 | −6 | 7 | Advance to the Final stage |
| 3 | Bragantino | 8 | 1 | 4 | 3 | 7 | 10 | −3 | 7 | |
| 4 | Itupiranga (R) | 8 | 1 | 3 | 4 | 8 | 12 | −4 | 6 | 2024 Paraense 2nd Division |

Source: Globo Esporte
(A) Advance to a further round; (R) Relegated

===== Matches =====
| 5 February 2023 1 | Remo | 3–1 | Independente | Belém |
| 17:00 UTC−3 | Soares 14'; Muriqui 45+5' (pen.), 79'; Raí (yellow card) 64' | Report | Mimica (red card) 45+1'; Flávio Bahia 65'; Martony (yellow card) 81' | Stadium: Baenão; Attendance: 12,885; Referee: Marco José Soares de Almeida |

| 12 February 2023 2 | São Francisco | 0–1 | Remo | Ipixuna do Pará |
| 15:30 UTC−3 | Ramires (yellow card) 58'; Ramon (yellow card) 63' | Report | Franco (yellow card) 45+2'; Pedro Vitor 61', (yellow card) 72' | Stadium: Ipixunão; Attendance: 1,711; Referee: Olivaldo José Alves Moraes |

| 15 February 2023 3 | Águia de Marabá | 1–2 | Remo | Marabá |
| 20:40 UTC−3 | Alan Maia (yellow card) 4'; David Cruz 16'; Bruno Limão (yellow card) 24'; Balão Marabá (yellow card) 45+7'; Danilo Cirqueira (yellow card) 85' | Report | Franco (yellow card) 4'; Raí (yellow card) 27'; Pablo Roberto (yellow card) 45+1'; Lucas Mendes (yellow card) 45+7'; Ícaro 45+11' (pen.); Fabinho 83'; Diego Guerra (yellow card) 90+2' | Stadium: Estádio Municipal Zinho de Oliveira; Attendance: 2,340; Referee: Wanbelton Lisboa Valente |

| 26 February 2023 4 | Remo | 4–2 | Cametá | Belém |
| 17:00 UTC−3 | Pedro Vitor (yellow card) 15'; Fabinho 21', 38', 90+2', (yellow card) 21'; Franco 24'; Raí (yellow card) 29'; Pablo Roberto (yellow card) 56'; Lucas Mendes (red card) 79' | Report | Pilar 45+3' (pen.), 70'; Wendel (yellow card) 48'; Ryan (red card) 79'; Marcão (yellow card) 90+7' | Stadium: Baenão; Attendance: 9,255; Referee: Alexandre Expedito Vieira da Silva Júnior |

| 5 March 2023 5 | Tuna Luso | 1–2 | Remo | Belém |
| 10:00 UTC−3 | Welthon 16'; Dedé (yellow card) 23'; Garagau (yellow card) 45+3' | Report | Kanu 41', (yellow card) 65'; Soares 49'; Wendel Lomar (yellow card) 64'; Ely (yellow card) 83'; Zé Carlos (yellow card) 90+6' | Stadium: Estádio Francisco Vasques; Attendance: 1,053; Referee: Andrey da Silva e Silva |

| 11 March 2023 6 | Remo | 2–0 | Tapajós | Belém |
| 18:00 UTC−3 | Jean Silva 5', 72'; Franco (yellow card) 49'; Rony (yellow card) 61'; Pedro Vitor (yellow card) 85'; Pablo Roberto (yellow card) 89' | Report | Léo Rosa (yellow card) 76' | Stadium: Baenão; Attendance: 7,053; Referee: Ignácio José de Almeida Pedro |

| 19 March 2023 7 | Castanhal | 2–3 | Remo | Belém |
| 10:00 UTC−3 | Murillo (yellow card) 21', (goal) 78'; Gabriel Santana (yellow card) 63'; Raylson 66'; Bruno Henrique (red card) 90+4' | Report | Paulinho Curuá (yellow card) 28'; Raí (yellow card) 39'; Kanu 46'; Ronald 71'; Jonílson 76'; Henrique (yellow card) 87' (yellow-red card) 90+2' | Stadium: Estádio Francisco Vasques; Attendance: 3,102; Referee: Djonaltan Costa de Araújo |

| 9 April 2023 8 | Remo | 0–1 | Paysandu | Belém |
| 17:00 UTC−3 | Ícaro (yellow card) 36' (yellow-red card) 44'; Pedro Vitor (yellow card) 45+1'; Diego Guerra (yellow card) 59' | Report | Edílson (yellow card) 45+4'; Vinícius Leite 50'; Thiago Coelho (yellow card) 90+1' | Stadium: Mangueirão; Attendance: 34,243; Referee: Olivaldo José Alves Moraes |

==== Final stage ====
===== Quarter-finals =====
| 15 April 2023 First leg | Caeté | 2–4 | Remo | Belém |
| 18:00 UTC−3 | PC Timborana 11'; Thurram (yellow card) 35'; Pedrinho (yellow card) 54'; Kauê 56'; Guly (yellow card) 70' | Report | Fabinho 24', 39'; Paulinho Curuá (yellow card) 50'; Ronald 80'; Kanu 90+1' | Stadium: Mangueirão; Attendance: 5,457; Referee: Andrey da Silva e Silva |

| 18 April 2023 Second leg | Remo | 2–1 (6–3 agg.) | Caeté | Belém |
| 20:00 UTC−3 | Fabinho 2'; Leonan (yellow card) 5', (goal) 51'; Pablo Roberto (yellow card) 29' (yellow-red card) 36'; Álvaro (yellow card) 56'; Diego Guerra (yellow card) 85' | Report | Mateus Martins (yellow card) 26'; Fernando Portel 34'; Mauro Praia (yellow card) 53'; Leandro Cearense (yellow card) 58'; Kauê (yellow card) 89' | Stadium: Mangueirão; Attendance: 8,924; Referee: Gustavo Ramos Melo |

===== Semi-finals =====
| 21 April 2023 First leg | Cametá | 1–1 | Remo | Cametá |
| 16:30 UTC−3 | Osvaldir (yellow card) 25'; Léo Pará (yellow card) 25'; Alexandre Santana 57'; George (yellow card) 57'; Marcão (yellow card) 60' | Report | Anderson Uchôa (yellow card) 49'; Raí 85' | Stadium: Estádio Parque do Bacurau; Attendance: 4,246; Referee: Marco José Soares de Almeida |

| 30 April 2023 Second leg | Remo | 4–0 (5–1 agg.) | Cametá | Belém |
| 17:00 UTC−3 | Muriqui 4'; Jean Silva 19'; Galdezani (yellow card) 34'; Franco 51'; Pablo Roberto 61' | Report | Taison (yellow card) 41'; Ryan (yellow card) 45+5'; Pet (yellow card) 58' | Stadium: Baenão; Attendance: 8,888; Referee: Andrey da Silva e Silva |

===== Finals =====
| 18 May 2023 First leg | Águia de Marabá | 1–0 | Remo | Marabá |
| 20:00 UTC−3 | Balão Marabá 83', (yellow card) 83' | Report | Diego Ivo (yellow card) 81'; Galdezani (yellow card) 90+1' | Stadium: Estádio Municipal Zinho de Oliveira; Attendance: 2,300; Referee: Paulo César Zanovelli da Silva |

| 26 May 2023 Second leg | Remo | 2–1 (2–2 agg.) (4–5 p) | Águia de Marabá | Belém |
| 20:00 UTC−3 | Ícaro (yellow card) 33'; Pedro Vitor 44', (yellow card) 90+1'; Fabinho (yellow card) 53'; Anderson Uchôa (red card) 69'; Rodrigo 80' (o.g.) | Report | Betão 16'; Rodrigo (yellow card) 88'; Balão Marabá (yellow card) 90+2' | Stadium: Baenão; Attendance: 11,928; Referee: Bruno Arleu de Araújo |
| | Penalties |
| | Rodriguinho (penalty scored); Muriqui (penalty scored); Pedro Vitor (penalty scored); Lucas Mendes (penalty missed); Fabinho (penalty scored) | | (penalty scored) Balão Marabá; (penalty scored) Evandro; (penalty scored) Bruno Limão; (penalty scored) Adauto; (penalty scored) Betão |

=== Copa do Brasil ===
Win Draw Loss

==== First round ====
| 23 February 2023 | Vitória-ES | 0–1 | Remo | Vitória |
| 21:30 UTC−3 | Gabriel Fernandes (yellow card) 25'; Jonata (yellow card) 42'; João Moura (yellow card) 54'; Rodriguinho (yellow card) 58'; Dodô (yellow card) 81'; Teco (yellow card) 88' | Report | Anderson Uchôa (yellow card) 15'; Franco (yellow card) 30'; Vinícius (yellow card) 31'; Ícaro (yellow card) 39'; Muriqui 63', (yellow card) 63'; Diego Ivo (yellow card) 64'; Pingo (yellow card) 81' | Stadium: Estádio Salvador Costa; Attendance: 1,858; Referee: Bruno Mota Correia |

==== Second round ====
| 8 March 2023 | Remo | 2–1 | São Luiz | Belém |
| 20:00 UTC−3 | Ícaro 28' (pen.); Moisés 66' (o.g.) | Report | Ygor Vinícius (yellow card) 20'; David (yellow card) 43'; Ricardo Thalheimer (yellow card) 44'; Negueba 89' (pen.) | Stadium: Baenão; Attendance: 13,290; Referee: Rodrigo José Pereira de Lima |

==== Third round ====
| 12 April 2023 First leg | Remo | 2–0 | Corinthians | Belém |
| 21:30 UTC−3 | Franco 12'; Muriqui 60' | Report | Carlos Miguel (yellow card) 45+2'; Fagner (yellow card) 74'; Fábio Santos (yellow card) 90+1' | Stadium: Mangueirão; Attendance: 42,599; Referee: Ramon Abatti |

| 26 April 2023 Second leg | Corinthians | 2–0 (2–2 agg.) (5–4 p) | Remo | São Paulo |
| 21:30 UTC−3 | Adson 2', (yellow card) 27'; Roni (yellow card) 23'; Matheus Bidu (yellow card) 68'; Chrystian Barletta (yellow card) 72'; Róger Guedes 90+3' | Report | Franco (yellow card) 65'; Vinícius (yellow card) 90'; Muriqui (yellow card) 90+3' | Stadium: Neo Química Arena; Attendance: 39,377; Referee: Paulo César Zanovelli da Silva |
| | Penalties |
| | Yuri Alberto (penalty scored); Maycon (penalty scored); Vera (penalty scored); Matheus Bidu (penalty scored); Róger Guedes (penalty scored) | | (penalty scored) Ícaro; (penalty missed) Leonan; (penalty scored) Anderson Uchôa; (penalty scored) Muriqui; (penalty scored) Claudinei |

=== Copa Verde ===
Win Draw Loss

==== Round of 16 ====
| 1 March 2023 | Remo | 4–1 | Humaitá | Belém |
| 19:00 UTC−3 | Ícaro (yellow card) 43', (goal) 57' (pen.), 75'; Diego Guerra (yellow card) 48'; Fabinho 51'; Rodriguinho 70'; Pingo (yellow card) 80' | Report | Babau (yellow card) 28'; Vinícius (yellow card) 55'; Paulinho Curuá 72' (o.g.) | Stadium: Baenão; Attendance: 7,325; Referee: Marcos Mateus Pereira |

==== Quarter-finals ====
| 15 March 2023 First leg | São Raimundo-RR | 1–0 | Remo | Boa Vista |
| 20:00 UTC−3 | Tavinho 34' | Report | Ícaro (yellow card) 54' | Stadium: Estádio Canarinho; Attendance: 1,981; Referee: Victor Lucas Pereira Silva |

| 22 March 2023 Second leg | Remo | 3–0 (3–1 agg.) | São Raimundo-RR | Belém |
| 19:00 UTC−3 | Franco 6'; Pablo Roberto (yellow card) 29'; Muriqui 33'; Pedro Vitor (yellow card) 45+5'; Ícaro (yellow card) 49'; Zé Carlos (yellow card) 85'; Jean Silva 90+1' | Report | Allan Rosário (yellow card) 23' (yellow-red card) 79'; Leandro Cabecinha (yellow card) 46'; Belão (yellow card) 88' | Stadium: Baenão; Attendance: 13,102; Referee: Alisson Sidnei Furtado |

==== Semi-finals ====
| 26 March 2023 First leg | Paysandu | 0–1 | Remo | Belém |
| 16:00 UTC−3 | Ricardinho (yellow card) 44'; Genílson (yellow card) 55' (yellow-red card) 68'; João Vieira (red card) 74'; Gabriel Davis (red card) 83' | Report | Muriqui 26'; Leonan (yellow card) 35'; Anderson Uchôa (yellow card) 36'; Diego Tavares (yellow card) 51' (yellow-red card) 70'; Franco (red card) 74' | Stadium: Mangueirão; Attendance: 24,984; Referee: Wilton Sampaio |

| 29 March 2023 Second leg | Remo | 1–2 (2–2 agg.) (2–4 p) | Paysandu | Belém |
| 20:00 UTC−3 | Muriqui 31'; Anderson Uchôa (yellow card) 90+1' | Report | Bruno Alves (yellow card) 25'; Mário Sérgio 50'; Fernando Gabriel 80', (yellow card) 86' | Stadium: Mangueirão; Attendance: 24,925; Referee: Dyorgines José Padovani de Andrade |
| | Penalties |
| | Ícaro (penalty scored); Muriqui (penalty missed); Anderson Uchôa (penalty scored); Rogério (penalty missed) | | (penalty scored) Mário Sérgio; (penalty scored) Ricardinho; (penalty missed) Fernando Gabriel; (penalty scored) Paulo Henrique; (penalty scored) Eltinho |
