= 2023 Campeonato Paraense finals =

- Event: 2023 Campeonato Paraense
Águia de Marabá	Remo
2	2
- on aggregate Águia de Marabá won 5–4 on penalties

First leg
Águia de Marabá	Remo
1	0
- Date: 18 May 2023
- Venue: Estádio Municipal Zinho de Oliveira, Marabá
- Referee: Paulo César Zanovelli da Silva
- Attendance: 2,300

Second leg
Remo	Águia de Marabá
2	1
- Date: 26 May 2023
- Venue: Baenão, Belém
- Referee: Bruno Arleu de Araújo
- Attendance: 11,928

The 2023 Campeonato Paraense finals was the final that decided the 2023 Campeonato Paraense, the 111th season of the Campeonato Paraense. The final were contested between Águia de Marabá and Remo.

Águia de Marabá won the first leg 1–0, and Remo won the second leg 2–1, which meant the title was decided by a penalty shoot-out, which Águia de Marabá won 5–4 to claim their first Campeonato Paraense title.

== Road to the final ==
Note: In all scores below, the score of the home team is given first.

Águia de Marabá			Round	Remo		
Opponent	Venue	Score		Opponent	Venue	Score
Group B			Group stage	Group A		
Pos / Team / Pld / Pts; 1 / Paysandu (A) / 8 / 19; 2 / Águia de Marabá (A) / 8 / 15; 3 / Cametá (A) / 8 / 14; 4 / São Francisco (A) / 8 / 12; Source: Globo Esporte (A) Advance to a further round			Group stage	Pos / Team / Pld / Pts; 1 / Remo (A) / 8 / 21; 2 / Caeté (A) / 8 / 7; 3 / Bragantino / 8 / 7; 4 / Itupiranga (R) / 8 / 6; Source: Globo Esporte (A) Advance to a further round; (R) Relegated		
Castanhal (won 4–1 on aggregate)	Away	1–2	Quarter-finals	Caeté (won 6–3 on aggregate)	Away	2–4
Castanhal (won 4–1 on aggregate)	Home	2–0	Quarter-finals	Caeté (won 6–3 on aggregate)	Home	2–1
Paysandu (tied 2–2 on aggregate, won 4–2 on penalties)	Home	0–1	Semi-finals	Cametá (won 5–1 on aggregate)	Away	1–1
Paysandu (tied 2–2 on aggregate, won 4–2 on penalties)	Away	1–2	Semi-finals	Cametá (won 5–1 on aggregate)	Home	4–0

== Format ==
The finals were played on a home-and-away two-legged basis. If tied on aggregate, the penalty shoot-out was used to determine the winner.

== Matches ==
=== First leg ===
18 May 2023
20:00 UTC−3

Águia de Marabá	1–0	Remo
Balão Marabá 83'	Report

Estádio Municipal Zinho de Oliveira, Marabá
Attendance: 2,300
Referee: Paulo César Zanovelli da Silva (Minas Gerais)

Águia de Marabá	Remo

GK	1	(Brazil) Axel Lopes
DF	2	(Brazil) Bruno Limão
DF	3	(Brazil) David Cruz
DF	13	(Brazil) Betão (c)
DF	6	(Brazil) Evandro		(substituted off) 72'
MF	5	(Brazil) Castro
MF	22	(Brazil) Danilo Cirqueira		(substituted off) 67'
MF	8	(Brazil) Patrick		(substituted off) 60'
MF	11	(Brazil) Alan Maia		(substituted off) 67'
FW	21	(Brazil) Wander
FW	9	(Brazil) Luam Parede		(substituted off) 60'
Substitutes:
GK	12	(Brazil) Matheus Rodrigues
DF	4	(Brazil) Rodrigo
DF	15	(Brazil) Sandro
DF	16	(Brazil) João Pabllo
DF	23	(Brazil) Maicon		(substituted in) 72'
MF	7	(Brazil) Balão Marabá	(yellow card) 83'	(substituted in) 67'
MF	14	(Brazil) Da Silva
MF	17	(Brazil) Wendell		(substituted in) 67'
MF	18	(Brazil) Pablo
MF	20	(Brazil) Adauto		(substituted in) 60'
FW	19	(Brazil) Luan Santos		(substituted in) 60'
Coach:
(Brazil) Mathaus Sodré

GK	1	(Brazil) Vinícius (c)
DF	2	(Brazil) Lucas Mendes
DF	14	(Brazil) Diego Ivo	(yellow card) 81'
DF	44	(Brazil) Ícaro
DF	6	(Brazil) Leonan
MF	4	(Brazil) Anderson Uchôa
MF	18	(Paraguay) Richard Franco		(substituted off) 41'
MF	8	(Brazil) Pablo Roberto		(substituted off) 74'
FW	7	(Brazil) Jean Silva		(substituted off) 85'
FW	98	(Brazil) Pedro Vitor		(substituted off) 74'
FW	10	(Brazil) Muriqui
Substitutes:
GK	95	(Brazil) Zé Carlos
DF	3	(Brazil) Diego Guerra
DF	13	(Brazil) Wendel Lomar
DF	26	(Brazil) Raí
DF	52	(Brazil) Lucas Marques		(substituted in) 74'
MF	11	(Brazil) Rodriguinho
MF	20	(Brazil) Soares
MF	25	(Brazil) Matheus Galdezani	(yellow card) 90+1'	(substituted in) 41'
MF	87	(Brazil) Álvaro		(substituted in) 74'
FW	15	(Brazil) Ronald		(substituted in) 85'
FW	29	(Brazil) Kanu
Coach:
(Brazil) Marcelo Cabo

Assistant referees:
Fernanda Nândrea Gomes Antunes (Minas Gerais)
Eduardo Gonçalves da Cruz (Mato Grosso do Sul)
Fourth official:
Djonaltan Costa de Araújo (Pará)
Fifth official:
Luís Diego Nascimento Lopes (Pará)
Video assistant referee:
Marco Aurélio Augusto Fazekas Ferreira (Minas Gerais)
Assistant video assistant referees:
Márcio Gleidson Correia Dias (Pará)
Hélcio Araújo Neves (Pará)

=== Second leg ===
26 May 2023
20:00 UTC−3

Remo	2–1	Águia de Marabá
Pedro Vitor 44'; Rodrigo 80' (o.g.)	Report	Betão 16'
Penalties
Rodriguinho (penalty scored); Muriqui (penalty scored); Pedro Vitor (penalty scored); Lucas Mendes (penalty missed); Fabinho (penalty scored)	4–5	(penalty scored) Balão Marabá; (penalty scored) Evandro; (penalty scored) Bruno Limão; (penalty scored) Adauto; (penalty scored) Betão

Baenão, Belém
Attendance: 11,928
Referee: Bruno Arleu de Araújo (Rio de Janeiro)

Remo	Águia de Marabá

GK	1	(Brazil) Vinícius (c)
DF	52	(Brazil) Lucas Marques		(substituted off) 78'
DF	44	(Brazil) Ícaro	(yellow card) 33'	(substituted off) 54'
DF	3	(Brazil) Diego Guerra
DF	6	(Brazil) Leonan		(substituted off) 65'
MF	4	(Brazil) Anderson Uchôa	(red card) 69'
MF	8	(Brazil) Pablo Roberto
MF	20	(Brazil) Soares		(substituted off) 46'
FW	7	(Brazil) Jean Silva		(substituted off) 46'
FW	98	(Brazil) Pedro Vitor	(yellow card) 90+1'
FW	10	(Brazil) Muriqui
Substitutes:
GK	95	(Brazil) Zé Carlos
DF	2	(Brazil) Lucas Mendes		(substituted in) 46'
DF	13	(Brazil) Wendel Lomar
DF	14	(Brazil) Diego Ivo		(substituted in) 54'
DF	26	(Brazil) Raí
MF	11	(Brazil) Rodriguinho		(substituted in) 78'
MF	56	(Brazil) Henrique
MF	87	(Brazil) Álvaro
FW	15	(Brazil) Ronald		(substituted in) 65'
FW	29	(Brazil) Kanu
FW	77	(Brazil) Fabinho	(yellow card) 53'	(substituted in) 46'
FW	89	(Brazil) Ricardinho
Interim Coach:
(Brazil) Fábio Cortez

GK	1	(Brazil) Axel Lopes
DF	2	(Brazil) Bruno Limão
DF	3	(Brazil) David Cruz		(substituted off) 50'
DF	13	(Brazil) Betão (c)
DF	6	(Brazil) Evandro
MF	5	(Brazil) Castro
MF	22	(Brazil) Danilo Cirqueira		(substituted off) 62'
MF	8	(Brazil) Patrick
MF	11	(Brazil) Alan Maia		(substituted off) 46'
FW	21	(Brazil) Wander		(substituted off) 62'
FW	9	(Brazil) Luam Parede		(substituted off) 32'
Substitutes:
GK	12	(Brazil) Matheus Rodrigues
DF	4	(Brazil) Rodrigo	(yellow card) 88'	(substituted in) 50'
DF	15	(Brazil) Sandro
DF	16	(Brazil) João Pabllo
DF	23	(Brazil) Maicon
MF	7	(Brazil) Balão Marabá	(yellow card) 90+2'	(substituted in) 62'
MF	14	(Brazil) Da Silva
MF	17	(Brazil) Wendell		(substituted in) 62'
MF	18	(Brazil) Pablo
MF	20	(Brazil) Adauto		(substituted in) 46'
FW	19	(Brazil) Luan Santos		(substituted in) 32'
Coach:
(Brazil) Mathaus Sodré

Assistant referees:
Alessandro Álvaro Rocha de Matos (Bahia)
Márcia Bezerra Lopes Caetano (Roraima)
Fourth official:
Olivaldo José Alves Moraes (Pará)
Fifth official:
Márcio Gleidson Correia Dias (Pará)
Video assistant referee:
Wagner Reway (Paraíba)
Assistant video assistant referees:
Luís Diego Nascimento Lopes (Pará)
Djonaltan Costa de Araújo (Pará)
