= 2023 Campeonato Paraense =

Campeonato Paraense
- Season: 2023
- Champions: Águia de Marabá (1st title)
- Relegated: Itupiranga; Independente
- Série D: Águia de Marabá; Cametá
- Copa do Brasil: Águia de Marabá; Remo; Paysandu
- Copa Verde: Águia de Marabá; Remo
- Matches: 64
- Goals: 166 (2.59 per match)
- Top goalscorer: Mário Sérgio (10 goals)
- Biggest home win: Remo 4–0 Cametá (30 April 2023)
- Biggest away win: Tuna Luso 1–4 Paysandu (16 April 2023)
- Highest scoring: Cametá 5–2 São Francisco (9 April 2023)
- Highest attendance: 34,243; Remo 0–1 Paysandu (9 April 2023)
- Lowest attendance: 41; São Francisco 1–0 Independente (19 March 2023)

The 2023 Campeonato Paraense was the 111th edition of Pará's top professional football league. The 2023 edition was supposed to start on 21 January, however, the championship was paralyzed by the STJD due to a new appeal filed by Paragominas regarding the previous edition.

Paragominas' case was dismissed, and the championship started on 5 February, with its end on 26 May.

Águia de Marabá won the championship for the 1st time.

== Format ==
Three groups with four clubs, with the teams of one group facing those of the other two. The eight best teams in the overall standings advance to the final stage. The matches of the quarter-finals, semi-finals, third place play-offs and the finals will be played on a home-and-away two-legged basis.

The two worst teams in the overall standings will be relegated to the 2024 Campeonato Paraense Second Division.

The champion and the runner-up qualify to the 2024 Copa Verde. The champion, the runner-up and the 3rd-placed team qualify to the 2024 Copa do Brasil. The best two teams who isn't on Campeonato Brasileiro Série A, Série B or Série C qualifies to 2024 Campeonato Brasileiro Série D.

== Participating teams ==
Locations of the 2023 Campeonato Paraense teams
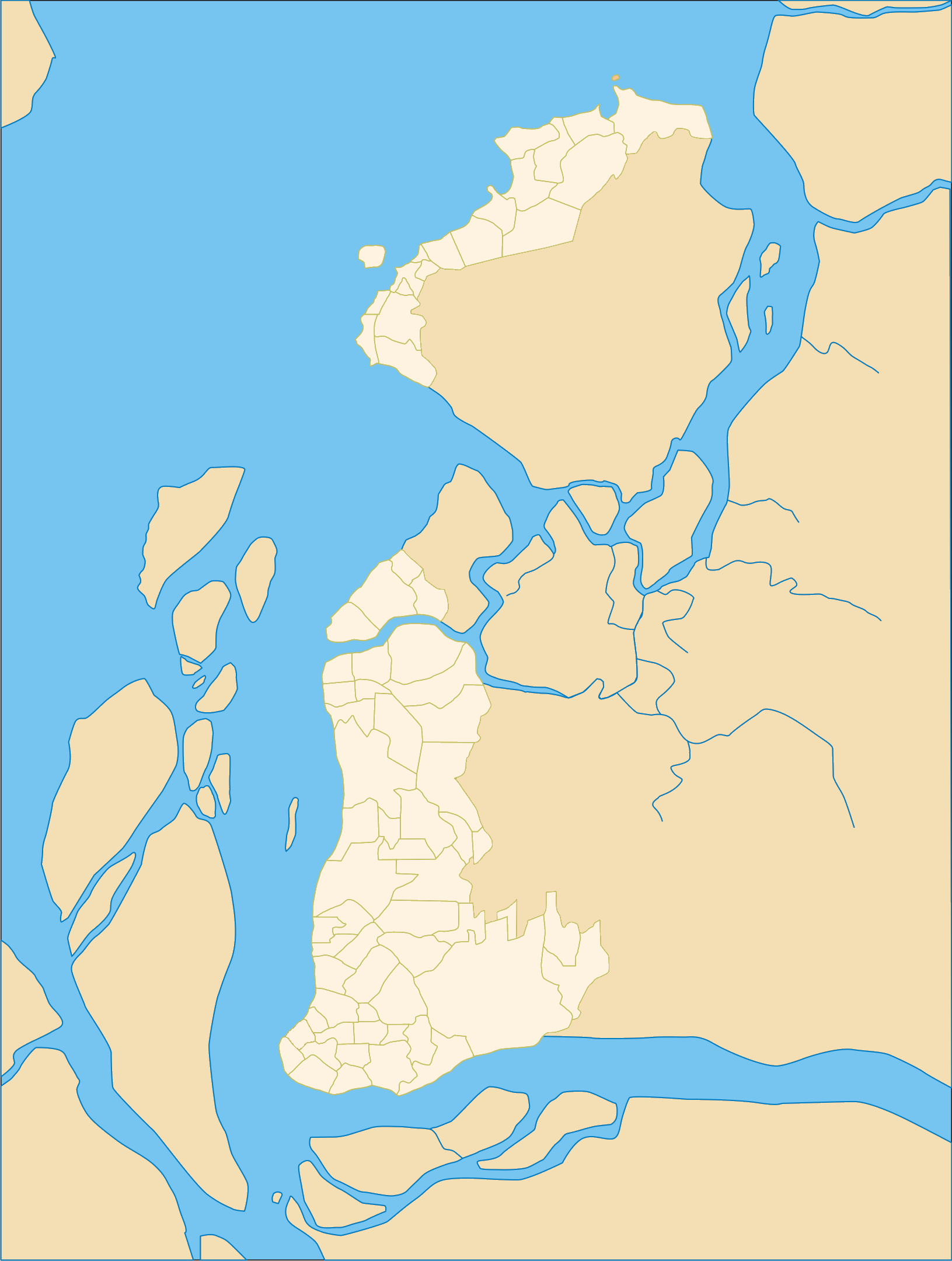
Locations of the 2023 Campeonato Paraense teams – Belém

| Club | Home city | Manager | 2022 result |
|---|---|---|---|
| Águia de Marabá | Marabá | Mathaus Sodré | 4th |
| Bragantino | Bragança | Júnior Amorim | 7th |
| Caeté | Bragança | Robson Melo | 6th |
| Cametá | Cametá | Rogerinho Gameleira | 1st (2nd Division) |
| Castanhal | Castanhal | Gian Dantas | 5th |
| Independente | Tucuruí | Sinomar Naves | 9th |
| Itupiranga | Itupiranga | Wando Costa | 10th |
| Paysandu | Belém | Marquinhos Santos | 2nd |
| Remo | Belém | Fábio Cortez (caretaker) | 1st |
| São Francisco | Santarém | Samuel Cândido | 2nd (2nd Division) |
| Tapajós | Santarém | Robson Melo | 8th |
| Tuna Luso | Belém | Pedro Paulo | 3rd |

=== Managerial changes ===
| Team | Outgoing manager | Date of vacancy | Incoming manager | Date of appointment |
|---|---|---|---|---|
| Tapajós | Arthur Bernardes | 12 February 2023 | Robson Melo | 12 February 2023 |
| Independente | Léo Goiano | 25 February 2023 | Sinomar Naves | 25 February 2023 |
| Tuna Luso | Josué Teixeira | 5 March 2023 | Rodrigo Reis | 7 March 2023 |
| Tuna Luso | Rodrigo Reis | 15 March 2023 | Pedro Paulo | 15 March 2023 |
| Castanhal | Hermes Júnior | 20 March 2023 | Gian Dantas | 20 March 2023 |
| Caeté | Emerson Almeida | 27 March 2023 | Robson Melo | 28 March 2023 |
| Paysandu | Márcio Fernandes | 29 April 2023 | Marquinhos Santos | 1 May 2023 |
| Remo | Marcelo Cabo | 23 May 2023 | Fábio Cortez (caretaker) | 25 May 2023 |

== Group stage ==
=== Group A ===
| Pos | Team | Pld | W | D | L | GF | GA | GD | Pts | Qualification or relegation |
|---|---|---|---|---|---|---|---|---|---|---|
| 1 | Remo (A) | 8 | 7 | 0 | 1 | 17 | 8 | +9 | 21 | Advance to the Final stage |
| 2 | Caeté (A) | 8 | 2 | 1 | 5 | 6 | 12 | −6 | 7 | Advance to the Final stage |
| 3 | Bragantino | 8 | 1 | 4 | 3 | 7 | 10 | −3 | 7 | |
| 4 | Itupiranga (R) | 8 | 1 | 3 | 4 | 8 | 12 | −4 | 6 | 2024 Paraense 2nd Division |

Source: Globo Esporte
(A) Advance to a further round; (R) Relegated

=== Group B ===
| Pos | Team | Pld | W | D | L | GF | GA | GD | Pts | Qualification or relegation |
|---|---|---|---|---|---|---|---|---|---|---|
| 1 | Paysandu (A) | 8 | 6 | 1 | 1 | 15 | 8 | +7 | 19 | Advance to the Final stage |
| 2 | Águia de Marabá (A) | 8 | 4 | 3 | 1 | 13 | 7 | +6 | 15 | Advance to the Final stage |
| 3 | Cametá (A) | 8 | 4 | 2 | 2 | 12 | 9 | +3 | 14 | Advance to the Final stage |
| 4 | São Francisco (A) | 8 | 4 | 0 | 4 | 8 | 8 | 0 | 12 | Advance to the Final stage |

Source: Globo Esporte
(A) Advance to a further round

=== Group C ===
| Pos | Team | Pld | W | D | L | GF | GA | GD | Pts | Qualification or relegation |
|---|---|---|---|---|---|---|---|---|---|---|
| 1 | Castanhal (A) | 8 | 2 | 3 | 3 | 10 | 10 | 0 | 9 | Advance to the Final stage |
| 2 | Tuna Luso (A) | 8 | 2 | 2 | 4 | 11 | 13 | −2 | 8 | Advance to the Final stage |
| 3 | Tapajós | 8 | 2 | 1 | 5 | 8 | 15 | −7 | 7 | |
| 4 | Independente (R) | 8 | 0 | 6 | 2 | 9 | 12 | −3 | 6 | 2024 Paraense 2nd Division |

Source: Globo Esporte
(A) Advance to a further round; (R) Relegated

== Final stage ==
=== Quarter-finals ===
15 April 2023
18:00 UTC –3

| Caeté | 2–4 | Remo |
|---|---|---|
| PC Timborana 11'; Kauê 56' | Report | Fabinho 24', 39'; Ronald 80'; Kanu 90+1' |

Mangueirão, Belém
Attendance: 5,457
Referee: Andrey da Silva e Silva
18 April 2023
20:00 UTC –3

| Remo | 2–1 | Caeté |
|---|---|---|
| Fabinho 2'; Leonan 51' | Report | Fernando Portel 34' |

Mangueirão, Belém
Attendance: 8,924
Referee: Gustavo Ramos Melo

Remo won 6–3 on aggregate and advanced to the semi-finals.

2 April 2023
10:00 UTC –3

| São Francisco | 0–1 | Cametá |
|---|---|---|
| | Report | Wendel 90+13' |

Ipixunão, Ipixuna do Pará
Attendance: 92
Referee: Marco José Soares de Almeida
9 April 2023
10:00 UTC –3

| Cametá | 5–2 | São Francisco |
|---|---|---|
| Léo Pará 1'; Pet 21'; Alexandre Santana 44'; Pilar 48'; Rogério 90+1' | Report | Ramon 68'; Matheus Magno 84' |

Estádio Parque do Bacurau, Cametá
Attendance: 455
Referee: Murilo Augusto Amoras de Almeida

Cametá won 6–2 on aggregate and advanced to the semi-finals.

16 April 2023
18:00 UTC –3

| Tuna Luso | 1–4 | Paysandu |
|---|---|---|
| Welthon 67' | Report | Vinícius Leite 1'; Mário Sérgio 17'; Eltinho 22'; João Vieira 43' |

Mangueirão, Belém
Attendance: 7,989
Referee: Marco José Soares de Almeida
19 April 2023
20:00 UTC –3

| Paysandu | 1–1 | Tuna Luso |
|---|---|---|
| Mário Sérgio 45+1' | Report | Welthon 19' (pen.) |

Estádio da Curuzu, Belém
Attendance: 4,322
Referee: Alexandre Expedito Vieira da Silva Júnior

Paysandu won 5–2 on aggregate and advanced to the semi-finals.

8 April 2023
10:00 UTC –3

| Castanhal | 1–2 | Águia de Marabá |
|---|---|---|
| Brendo 90' | Report | Luam Parede 41'; Danilo Cirqueira 83' |

Complexo Esportivo Ninho do Japiim, Castanhal
Attendance: 350
Referee: Ignácio José de Almeida Pedro
16 April 2023
16:00 UTC –3

| Águia de Marabá | 2–0 | Castanhal |
|---|---|---|
| Castro 15'; Luan Santos 64' | Report |

Estádio Municipal Zinho de Oliveira, Marabá
Attendance: 1,321
Referee: Joelson Nazareno Ferreira Cardoso

Águia de Marabá won 4–1 on aggregate and advanced to the semi-finals.

=== Semi-finals ===
21 April 2023
16:30 UTC –3

| Cametá | 1–1 | Remo |
|---|---|---|
| Alexandre Santana 57' | Report | Raí 85' |

Estádio Parque do Bacurau, Cametá
Attendance: 4,246
Referee: Marco José Soares de Almeida
30 April 2023
17:00 UTC –3

| Remo | 4–0 | Cametá |
|---|---|---|
| Muriqui 4'; Jean Silva 19'; Franco 51'; Pablo Roberto 61' | Report |

Baenão, Belém
Attendance: 8,888
Referee: Andrey da Silva e Silva

Remo won 5–1 on aggregate and advanced to the semi-finals.

22 April 2023
17:00 UTC –3

| Águia de Marabá | 0–1 | Paysandu |
|---|---|---|
| | Report | Mário Sérgio 55' (pen.) |

Estádio Municipal Zinho de Oliveira, Marabá
Attendance: 2,139
Referee: Klever da Costa Lobo
29 April 2023
19:00 UTC –3

| Paysandu | 1–2 | Águia de Marabá |
|---|---|---|
| Mário Sérgio 31' | Report | Luam Parede 45'; David Cruz 74' (pen.) |
Penalties
| Mário Sérgio (penalty scored); Eltinho (penalty missed); Vinícius Leite (penalty scored); Paulo Henrique (penalty missed) | 2–4 | (penalty scored) Balão Marabá; (penalty scored) David Cruz; (penalty scored) Pablo; (penalty scored) Luan Santos |

Mangueirão, Belém
Attendance: 9,389
Referee: Sávio Pereira Sampaio

Tied 2–2 on aggregate, Águia de Marabá won on penalties.

=== Third place play-off ===
14 May 2023
16:00 UTC –3

| Cametá | 1–1 | Paysandu |
|---|---|---|
| Wendel 70' | Report | Naylhor 4' |

Estádio Parque do Bacurau, Cametá
Attendance: 454
Referee: Olivaldo José Alves Moraes
24 May 2023
20:00 UTC –3

| Paysandu | 2–0 | Cametá |
|---|---|---|
| Dalberto 45+5'; Bruno Alves 54' (pen.) | Report |

Estádio da Curuzu, Belém
Attendance: 2,366
Referee: Marco José Soares de Almeida

Paysandu won 3–1 on aggregate.

=== Finals ===
18 May 2023
20:00 UTC –3

| Águia de Marabá | 1–0 | Remo |
|---|---|---|
| Balão Marabá 83' | Report |

Estádio Municipal Zinho de Oliveira, Marabá
Attendance: 2,300
Referee: Paulo César Zanovelli da Silva
26 May 2023
20:00 UTC –3

| Remo | 2–1 | Águia de Marabá |
|---|---|---|
| Pedro Vitor 44'; Rodrigo 80' (o.g.) | Report | Betão 16' |
Penalties
| Rodriguinho (penalty scored); Muriqui (penalty scored); Pedro Vitor (penalty scored); Lucas Mendes (penalty missed); Fabinho (penalty scored) | 4–5 | (penalty scored) Balão Marabá; (penalty scored) Evandro; (penalty scored) Bruno Limão; (penalty scored) Adauto; (penalty scored) Betão |

Baenão, Belém
Attendance: 11,928
Referee: Bruno Arleu de Araújo

Tied 2–2 on aggregate, Águia de Marabá won on penalties.
