= Renanzinho =

Renanzinho may refer to:

- Renanzinho (footballer, born 1997), full name Renan Martins Pereira, Brazilian football defensive midfielder
- Renanzinho (footballer, born 2001), full name Renan Pereira Muniz Oliveira, Brazilian football forward
