= 2022 Copa Verde =

9th edition of a Brazilian association football competition

Tournament details
- Country: Brazil
- Dates: 25 October – 19 November
- Teams: 17

Final positions
- Champions: (Pará) Paysandu (3rd title)
- Runner-up: (Goiás) Vila Nova

Tournament statistics
- Matches played: 19
- Goals scored: 47 (2.47 per match)
- Top goal scorer(s): (Brazil) Marlon (Brazil) Yan Philippe (3 goals each)

The 2022 Copa Verde was the ninth edition of the football competition held in Brazil. Featuring 17 clubs, Acre, Mato Grosso, Pará and Roraima have two vacancies; Amazonas, Distrito Federal, Espírito Santo, Goiás, Mato Grosso do Sul, Rondônia and Tocantins with one each. The others two berths was set according to CBF ranking. Initially, the competition was to be formed by 24 clubs, but seven dropped out.

In the finals, Paysandu defeated Vila Nova 4–3 on penalties after tied 1–1 on aggregate to win their third title and a place in the third round of the 2023 Copa do Brasil.

== Qualified teams ==
Association	Team	Qualification method
(Acre (state)) Acre; 2 berths	Rio Branco	2021 Campeonato Acreano champions
(Acre (state)) Acre; 2 berths	Humaitá	2021 Campeonato Acreano runners-up
(Amazonas (Brazilian state)) Amazonas; 1 berth	São Raimundo	2021 Campeonato Amazonense runners-up
(Federal District (Brazil)) Distrito Federal; 1 berth	Brasiliense	2021 Campeonato Brasiliense champions
(Espírito Santo) Espírito Santo; 1 berth	Real Noroeste	2021 Campeonato Capixaba champions
(Goiás) Goiás; 2 berths	Vila Nova	2021 Campeonato Goiano runners-up
(Goiás) Goiás; 2 berths	Goiás	1st best placed team in the 2022 CBF ranking not already qualified
(Mato Grosso) Mato Grosso; 2+1 berths	Cuiabá	2021 Campeonato Mato-Grossense champions
(Mato Grosso) Mato Grosso; 2+1 berths	CEOV	2021 Campeonato Mato-Grossense runners-up
(Mato Grosso) Mato Grosso; 2+1 berths	Luverdense	2nd best placed team in the 2022 CBF ranking not already qualified
(Mato Grosso do Sul) Mato Grosso do Sul; 1 berth	Costa Rica	2021 Campeonato Sul-Mato-Grossense champions
(Pará) Pará; 2 berths	Paysandu	2021 Campeonato Paraense champions
(Pará) Pará; 2 berths	Tuna Luso	2021 Campeonato Paraense runners-up
(Rondônia) Rondônia; 1 berth	Real Ariquemes	2021 Campeonato Rondoniense runners-up
(Roraima) Roraima; 2 berths	São Raimundo	2021 Campeonato Roraimense champions
(Roraima) Roraima; 2 berths	Náutico	2021 Campeonato Roraimense runners-up
(Tocantins) Tocantins; 1 berth	Tocantinópolis	2021 Campeonato Tocantinense champions

Note: Atlético Goianiense, Ceilândia, Grêmio Anápolis, Manaus, Nova Venécia, Remo and Trem were qualified, but dropped out.

== Schedule ==
The schedule of the competition is as follows.

Stage	First leg	Second leg
First round	25 October 2022	
Round of 16	27, 28 and 29 October 2022	
Quarter-finals	1 and 2 November 2022	
Semi-finals	8 and 9 November 2022	12 November 2022
Finals	15 November 2022	19 November 2022

== First round ==
Team 1	Score	Team 2
Humaitá (Acre (state))	3–0	(Roraima) Náutico

== Bracket ==
Round of 16
(Acre (state)) Rio Branco	1 (4)
(Pará) Tuna Luso (p)	1 (5)
(Roraima) São Raimundo	1
(Amazonas (Brazilian state)) São Raimundo	2
(Pará) Paysandu	3
(Acre (state)) Humaitá	0
(Rondônia) Real Ariquemes	0
(Tocantins) Tocantinópolis	4
(Mato Grosso) Cuiabá	2
(Mato Grosso do Sul) Costa Rica	0
(Mato Grosso) Luverdense	0
(Federal District (Brazil)) Brasiliense	1
(Goiás) Vila Nova	2
(Mato Grosso) CEOV	1
Goiás	2 (4)
(Espírito Santo) Real Noroeste (p)	2 (5)

Quarter-finals
(Pará) Tuna Luso	0
(Amazonas (Brazilian state)) São Raimundo	3
(Pará) Paysandu	2
(Tocantins) Tocantinópolis	0
(Mato Grosso) Cuiabá	0
(Federal District (Brazil)) Brasiliense	3
(Goiás) Vila Nova (p)	0 (3)
(Espírito Santo) Real Noroeste	0 (2)

Semi-finals
(Amazonas (Brazilian state)) São Raimundo	2	0	2
(Pará) Paysandu	2	3	5
(Federal District (Brazil)) Brasiliense	1	1	2
(Goiás) Vila Nova	1	2	3

Finals
(Pará) Paysandu (p)	0	1	1 (4)
(Goiás) Vila Nova	0	1	1 (3)

== Finals ==
15 November 2022
18:30 BRT (UTC−3)

Paysandu (Pará)	0–0	(Goiás) Vila Nova
	Report

Estádio da Curuzu, Belém
Attendance: 11,384
Referee: Paulo Henrique de Melo Salmazio

19 November 2022
19:00 BRT (UTC−3)

Vila Nova (Goiás)	1–1	(Pará) Paysandu
Matheuzinho 26'	Report	João Vieira 90+5'
Penalties
Wágner (penalty scored); Sousa (penalty missed); Alex Silva (penalty scored); Diego Tavares (penalty missed); Rafael Donato (penalty scored)	3–4	(penalty scored) Marlon; (penalty scored) Ricardinho; (penalty missed) Gabriel Davis; (penalty scored) João Vieira; (penalty scored) Patrick Brey

Estádio Serra Dourada, Goiânia
Attendance: 24,591
Referee: Paulo Henrique Schleich Vollkopf

Tied 1–1 on aggregate, Paysandu won on penalties.
