= 2020 Campeonato Paraense =

Campeonato Paraense
- Season: 2020
- Champions: Paysandu
- Série D: Castanhal; Paragominas
- Copa Verde: Paysandu; Castanhal
- Copa do Brasil: Paysandu; Remo; Castanhal
- Matches played: 57
- Goals scored: 153 (2.68 per match)
- Top goalscorer: Nicolas (10 goals)
- Biggest home win: Paragominas 5–0 Carajás (19 January 2020); Paysandu 5–0 Paragominas (16 February 2020)
- Biggest away win: Paragominas 0–4 Paysandu (2 August 2020)
- Highest scoring: Paragominas 5–0 Carajás (19 January 2020); Paysandu 5–0 Paragominas (16 February 2020)
- Highest attendance: 26,152; Remo 1–2 Paysandu (9 February 2020)
- Lowest attendance: 30; Carajás 1–2 Itupiranga (16 February 2020)

The 2020 Campeonato Paraense was the 108th edition of Pará's top professional football league. The competition started on 22 January and ended on 6 September. Paysandu won the championship for the 48th time.

On 19 March 2020, the governor of Pará and the FPF suspended the Campeonato Paraense indefinitely due to the coronavirus pandemic in Brazil.

== Format ==
The champion and the best placed team not qualified via CBF ranking qualify to the 2021 Copa Verde. The champion, the runner-up and the 3rd-placed team qualify to the 2021 Copa do Brasil. The best two teams who isn't on Campeonato Brasileiro Série A, Série B or Série C qualifies to 2021 Campeonato Brasileiro Série D.

== Participating teams ==
Club	Home city	2019 result
Águia de Marabá	Marabá	6th
Bragantino	Bragança	3rd
Carajás	Belém	2nd (on 2nd Division)
Castanhal	Castanhal	7th
Independente	Tucuruí	2nd
Itupiranga	Itupiranga	1st (on 2nd Division)
Paragominas	Paragominas	5th
Paysandu	Belém	4th
Remo	Belém	1st
Tapajós	Santarém	8th

== Group stage ==
Pos	Team	Pld	W	D	L	GF	GA	GD	Pts	Qualification or relegation
1	Paysandu	10	8	1	1	25	7	+18	25	Advance to Final stage
2	Remo	10	7	2	1	16	8	+8	23	Advance to Final stage
3	Castanhal	10	6	2	2	21	15	+6	20	Advance to Final stage
4	Paragominas	10	5	1	4	17	16	+1	16	Advance to Final stage
5	Bragantino	10	5	1	4	10	10	0	16	
6	Águia de Marabá	10	3	2	5	11	16	−5	11	
7	Itupiranga	10	3	2	5	10	16	−6	11	
8	Independente	10	3	1	6	10	14	−4	10	
9	Tapajós	10	2	2	6	11	14	−3	8	
10	Carajás	10	0	2	8	8	23	−15	2	

Updated to match(es) played on 5 August 2020. Source: Globo Esporte

== Final stage ==
=== Semi-finals ===
12 August 2020
20:00 UTC –3

Paragominas	3–2	Paysandu
Netinho 10', 26'; Valker 90+1'	Report	Nicolas 45'; Wesley Matos 69'

Mangueirão, Belém
Attendance: 0 (Note: The remainder of the competition, held in August 2020, will be played behind closed doors due to the COVID-19 pandemic in Brazil.)
Referee: Joelson Silva dos Santos
19 August 2020
20:00 UTC –3

Paysandu	2–0	Paragominas
Nicolas 64'; Uilliam 86'	Report

Mangueirão, Belém
Attendance: 0
Referee: Dewson Fernando Freitas da Silva

Paysandu won 4–3 on aggregate and advanced to the finals.

13 August 2020
20:00 UTC –3

Castanhal	0–1	Remo
	Report	Lucão 3' (o.g.)

Mangueirão, Belém
Attendance: 0
Referee: Joelson Nazareno Ferreira Cardoso
20 August 2020
20:00 UTC –3

Remo	2–0	Castanhal
Eduardo Ramos 51' (pen.); Tcharlles 72'	Report

Mangueirão, Belém
Attendance: 0
Referee: Gustavo Ramos Melo

Remo won 3–0 on aggregate and advanced to the finals.

=== Finals ===
2 September 2020
20:00 UTC –3

Paysandu	2–1	Remo
Uilliam 85'; Netinho 88'	Report	Eduardo Ramos 38'

Mangueirão, Belém
Attendance: 0
Referee: Bráulio da Silva Machado
6 September 2020
17:00 UTC –3

Remo	0–1	Paysandu
	Report	Anderson Uchôa 90+6'

Mangueirão, Belém
Attendance: 0
Referee: Wilton Pereira Sampaio
