= Rafael Silva (footballer, born 1995) =

Brazilian footballer

Personal information
- Full name: Rafael Aparecido da Silva
- Date of birth: 26 May 1995 (age 31)
- Place of birth: Goiânia, Brazil
- Height: 1.77 m (5 ft 10 in)
- Position: Forward

Team information
- Current team: Inter de Limeira
- Number: 9

Youth career
- Luverdense

Senior career*
Years	Team	Apps	(Gls)
2013–2018	Luverdense	117	(14)
2018	Vila Nova	20	(6)
2019	São Bento	6	(0)
2019–2023	Mirassol	45	(6)
2020–2021	→ Juventude (loan)	23	(2)
2021	→ Vila Nova (loan)	11	(1)
2022	→ Paraná (loan)	15	(1)
2022	→ Marcílio Dias (loan)	0	(0)
2023	→ ABC (loan)	5	(0)
2023	→ Remo (loan)	1	(0)
2024–	Inter de Limeira	29	(6)
- * Club domestic league appearances and goals as of 14:52, 10 February 2025 (UTC)

Rafael Aparecido da Silva (born 26 May 1995), simply known as Rafael Silva, is a Brazilian professional footballer who plays for as a forward.

== Career statistics ==
As of 10 February 2025

Appearances and goals by club, season and competition
Club	Season	League			State League		Cup		Continental		Other		Total	
Club	Season	Division	Apps	Goals	Apps	Goals	Apps	Goals	Apps	Goals	Apps	Goals	Apps	Goals
Luverdense	2013	Série C	5	0	0	0	—		—		—		5	0
Luverdense	2014	Série B	0	0	0	0	—		—		—		0	0
Luverdense	2015	Série B	2	0	2	0	1	0	—		2 (Note: Appearance(s) in Copa Verde)	0	7	0
Luverdense	2016	Série B	24	1	17	2	—		—		2	0	43	3
Luverdense	2017	Série B	33	4	8	2	4	0	—		8	4	53	10
Luverdense	2018	Série C	14	1	12	4	2	0	—		5	3	33	8
Luverdense	Total		78	6	39	8	7	0	—		17	7	141	21
Vila Nova	2018	Série B	13	5	—		—		—		—		13	5
Vila Nova	2019	Série B	0	0	7	1	4	1	—		—		11	2
Vila Nova	Total		13	5	7	1	4	1	—		—		24	7
São Bento	2019	Série B	6	0	—		—		—		—		6	0
Mirassol	2019	Paulista	—		—		—		—		8 (Note: Appearance(s) in Copa Paulista)	4	8	4
Mirassol	2020	Série D	0	0	9	2	—		—		—		9	2
Mirassol	2021	Série C	15	1	9	1	1	0	—		—		25	2
Mirassol	2022	Série C	0	0	12	2	2	0	—		—		14	2
Mirassol	Total		15	1	30	5	3	0	—		8	4	56	10
Juventude (loan)	2020	Série B	22	2	1	0	4	0	—		—		27	2
Vila Nova (loan)	2021	Série B	11	1	—		—		—		5	1	16	2
Paraná (loan)	2022	Série D	15	1	—		—		—		—		15	1
Marcílio Dias (loan)	2022	Série D	—		—		—		—		9 (Note: Appearance(s) in Copa Santa Catarina)	3	9	3
ABC (loan)	2023	Série B	1	0	4	0	2	2	—		5 (Note: Appearance(s) in Copa do Nordeste)	1	12	3
Remo (loan)	2023	Série C	1	0	—		—		—		—		1	0
Inter de Limeira	2024	Série D	13	4	10	1	—		—		—		23	5
Inter de Limeira	2025	Série D	0	0	6	1	—		—		—		6	1
Inter de Limeira	Total		13	4	16	2	—		—		—		29	6
Career total			175	20	97	16	20	3	0	0	44	16	336	55

== Honours ==
Luverdense

- Copa Verde: 2017

Marcílio Dias

- Copa Santa Catarina: 2022
