= Vinícius (footballer, born 1984) =

Brazilian footballer

Personal information
- Full name: Damião Vinícius Silva Ribeiro
- Date of birth: November 9, 1984 (age 41)
- Place of birth: Goiânia, Brazil
- Height: 1.90 m (6 ft 3 in)
- Position: Goalkeeper

Team information
- Current team: Tuna Luso
- Number: 1

Youth career
- Vila Nova

Senior career*
Years	Team	Apps	(Gls)
2004–2008	Vila Nova	0	(0)
2008	Criciúma	0	(0)
2009–2016	Boavista	64	(0)
2009–2010	→ Duque de Caxias (loan)	43	(1)
2010–2011	→ Flamengo (loan)	0	(0)
2012	→ CRB (loan)	1	(0)
2014	→ Esportivo (loan)	15	(0)
2014–2015	→ Novo Hamburgo (loan)	6	(0)
2015	→ Operário Ferroviário (loan)	0	(0)
2017–2024	Remo	258	(0)
2025	Bragantino	11	(0)
2025–	Tuna Luso	3	(0)
- * Club domestic league appearances and goals as of 25 May 2025

Damião Vinícius Silva Ribeiro or simply Vinícius (born November 9, 1984) is a Brazilian footballer who plays as a goalkeeper for Tuna Luso.

== Career ==
Damian Vinícius Silva Ribeiro was born in Goiânia. He began his career with the team Vila Nova, reaching Gávea only in 2010.

The goalkeeper started his career with Vinicius only nineteen years old defending Vila Nova team in his state, oscillating between Goiás and reserve holder in the first instance, not long before the archer assume absolute ownership and help the Town in its recent walk.

He was champion with the Goiás Vila Nova in 2005 and the following year, despite their age and competition from other established names, earned the award for best goalkeeper in the State Championship, thereby arousing the envy of other teams across the country. Also in the team's center-west Brazil, Vinicius experienced other feelings distinct, as they were relegated to Serie C in the Brazilian Championship in 2006, but later helped to lift the same town the following years.

In 2008, more precisely in the month of July, the keeper decided to breathe fresh air and has contracted with the Santa Catarina Criciúma for the race of the series B of the Brazilian Championship that year, a competition that was no stranger to the athlete. Also, an ironic twist of fate, Criciúma also experienced the descent that season and ended up in Serie C. Vinicius in turn, went to the Boavista side that defended in the course of the Carioca Championship 2009 won by Brazil's Flamengo.

The performances of Vinicius put him back in contention Series B do Brasileirão, but this time defending the Duque de Caxias, where club remained until mid-2010, by loan from Boavista masters of their federal rights. The 10th season, he received the opportunity to defend a team of fans in Brazil, Flamengo, known to maintain and disclose in its cast goalkeeper.

Despite the difficulty of elevating the shirt of a Fla, given the absolute ownership of Marcelo Lomba, Vinicius looked in the Brazilian Championship U-23 to get to project inside the club, and was competing in the tournament that the young goalkeeper was able to show their quality and inclusive Its ability to take penalties.

== Honours ==
Flamengo

- Campeonato Carioca: 2011

CRB

- Campeonato Alagoano: 2012

Operário Ferroviário

- Campeonato Paranaense: 2015

Remo

- Campeonato Paraense: 2018, 2019, 2022; runner-up: 2017, 2020, 2023
- Copa Verde: 2021; runner-up: 2020
- Campeonato Brasileiro Série C runner-up: 2020
