= Claudinei (footballer) =

Brazilian footballer (born 1988)

Personal information
- Full name: Claudinei Junio de Souza
- Date of birth: 8 October 1988 (age 38)
- Place of birth: Sete Lagoas, Brazil
- Height: 1.72 m (5 ft 7 1/2 in)
- Position: Defensive midfielder

Team information
- Current team: Sampaio Corrêa

Youth career
- –2009: Democrata-SL

Senior career*
Years	Team	Apps	(Gls)
2009–2012	Boa Esporte	86	(1)
2012–2015	Tombense	0	(0)
2012	→ Figueirense (loan)	23	(0)
2013	→ América Mineiro (loan)	58	(0)
2013–2017	Coimbra	0	(0)
2014	→ Atlético Mineiro (loan)	16	(0)
2015	→ Avaí (loan)	16	(1)
2016	→ América Mineiro (loan)	35	(0)
2017	→ Ferroviária (loan)	10	(0)
2017	→ Vila Nova (loan)	11	(1)
2018–2022	CRB	174	(2)
2023	Inter de Limeira	13	(0)
2023	Remo	14	(2)
2023–	Sampaio Corrêa	8	(0)
- * Club domestic league appearances and goals as of 4 November 2023

Claudinei Junio de Souza (born 8 October 1988), simply known as Claudinei, is a Brazilian footballer who plays for Sampaio Corrêa as a defensive midfielder.

== Honours ==
Atlético Mineiro

- Recopa Sudamericana: 2014
- Copa do Brasil: 2014

América Mineiro

- Campeonato Mineiro: 2016
