= Arthur Bernardes (football manager) =

Brazilian football manager (born 1955)

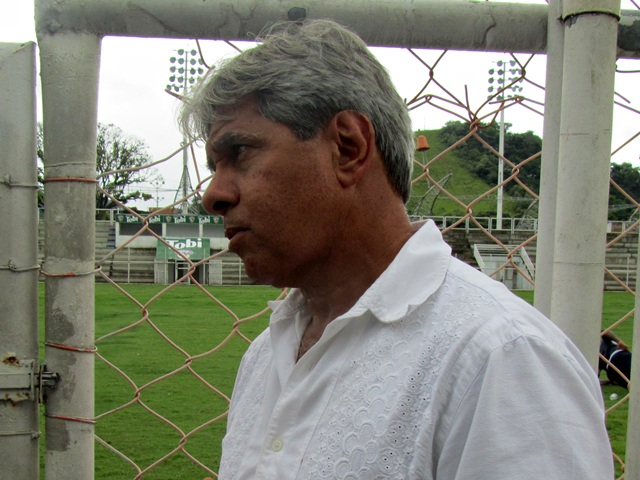

Personal information
- Full name: Arthur Bernardes Ribas da Silva Filho
- Date of birth: 15 May 1955 (age 71)
- Place of birth: Rio de Janeiro, Brazil
- Height: 1.84 m (6 ft 1/2 in)

Team information
- Current team: Tapajós (head coach)

Managerial career
- Years: Team
- 1988: Madureira
- 1989: América Mineiro
- 1990: Atlético Mineiro
- 1991: Sport Recife
- 1991: América-SP
- 1992: Fluminense
- 1992: Goiás
- 1993: Marília
- 1994: Bahia
- 1994–1995: União Madeira
- 1995: Flamengo U20
- 1996: Al-Riyadh
- 1996–1998: Al-Wasl
- 1999: Dubai Club
- 2000: Alianza Lima
- 2001–2002: Al-Shabab
- 2002: Botafogo
- 2003: Dubai Club
- 2003–2004: Al-Wasl
- 2005: Petróleos Luanda
- 2006: Marília
- 2007: Juventus-SP
- 2008–2009: Jeju United
- 2010: Al Kuwait
- 2010: América-RJ
- 2011: Duque de Caxias
- 2011: Fortaleza
- 2012–2013: Khor Fakkan
- 2013: Atlético Paranaense U23
- 2013–2014: Gangwon
- 2016: Gama
- 2016: Al-Mujazzal
- 2017: Nacional de Manaus
- 2020: Rayong
- 2020–2021: Perilima
- 2021: Al-Ittihad Aleppo
- 2023–: Tapajós

Arthur Bernardes Ribas da Silva Filho (born 15 May 1955) is a Brazilian professional football coach, currently in charge of Tapajós.

== Honours ==
Sport Recife

- Campeonato Pernambucano: 1991

Al Wasl

- UAE Arabian Gulf League: 1996–97

Al Kuwait

- Kuwait Super Cup: 2010
- Kuwait Federation Cup: 2009–10
