= Bruno Pianissolla =

Brazilian footballer (born 1987)

Bruno
Personal information
- Full name: Bruno Pianissolla
- Date of birth: February 5, 1987 (age 39)
- Place of birth: Guarapari, Brazil
- Height: 1.94 m (6 ft 4 in)
- Position: Goalkeeper

Team information
- Current team: Goiânia

Youth career
- 2005–2007: Cruzeiro

Senior career*
Years	Team	Apps	(Gls)
2007	→ Itaúna (Loan)		
2008	→ Santa Cruz (Loan)		
2009	→ Ipatinga (Loan)		
2010	→ Democrata (Loan)		
2010–	Ipatinga	1	(0)
- * Club domestic league appearances and goals

Bruno Pianissolla (born February 5, 1987), or simply Bruno, is a Brazilian footballer who plays as a goalkeeper for Joinville Esporte Clube (SC).
