= Sport Clube Itupiranga =

Itupiranga
- Full name: Sport Clube Itupiranga
- Nickname(s): Crocodilo (Crocodile)
- Founded: 8 March 2018; 7 years ago
- Ground: Estádio Jaime Sena Pimentel
- Capacity: 1,000
- President: Isaias Parreiras
- League: Campeonato Paraense Second Division
- 2023: Paraense, 11th of 12 (relegated)
Home colors	Away colors

Sport Clube Itupiranga, or simply Itupiranga, is a Brazilian football club based in Itupiranga, Pará state.

== Stadium ==
Itupiranga play their home games at Estádio Jaime Sena Pimentel. The stadium has a maximum capacity of 1,000 people.

== Honours ==
- Campeonato Paraense Second Division

Winners (1): 2019

== Competition record ==
Campeonato Paraense
Season	Tier	Division	Place
2019	2	Divisão de Acesso	1º
2020	1	Primeira Divisão	7º
2021	1	Primeira Divisão	5º
2022	1	Primeira Divisão	10º
2023	1	Primeira Divisão	11º (R)
2024	2	Série B1	
