= Wendel (footballer, born 1991) =

Brazilian footballer

Personal information
- Full name: Wendel Alex dos Santos
- Date of birth: August 31, 1991 (age 35)
- Place of birth: Ribeirão Preto, Brazil
- Height: 1.80 m (5 ft 11 in)
- Position: Attacking midfielder

Team information
- Current team: Comercial Futebol Clube
- Number: 9

Youth career
- 2010: Atlético Mineiro

Senior career*
Years	Team	Apps	(Gls)
2010–2014	Atlético Mineiro	3	(0)
2012	→ Paraná (loan)	21	(5)
2013–2014	→ Boa Esporte (loan)	4	(0)
2014	→ Bangu (loan)	6	(0)
2014–2015	Madureira	8	(1)
2015–2016	Bangu	5	(1)
2016–2017	Cabofriense	6	(0)
2017–2018	Mosta	3	(3)
2019–2020	Clube Atlético Serranense	9	(5)
2020–2021	Club Athlétique Bizertin	7	(0)
2022	Uberaba Sport Club	3	(3)
2022–	Comercial Futebol Clube	43	(20)
- * Club domestic league appearances and goals as of 15 January 2018

Wendel Alex dos Santos, or simply Wendel, is a Brazilian attacking midfielder who plays for Comercial Futebol Clube.

== Career ==
Wendel is an attacking midfielder who came up through the youth ranks at Atlético Mineiro. A constant presence on the call-up lists for youth selections at both the junior and senior levels, he was responsible for scoring the title-clinching goal for Atlético in the 2009 Copa BH, defeating Internacional 1-0. Wendel made his professional debut for Atlético the following year on 3 June in a Série A match.

=== Career statistics ===
(Correct as of October 16, 2010)

Club	Season	State League		Brazilian Série A		Copa do Brasil		Copa Libertadores		Copa Sudamericana		Total	
Club	Season	Apps	Goals	Apps	Goals	Apps	Goals	Apps	Goals	Apps	Goals	Apps	Goals
Atlético Mineiro	2010	-	-	2	0	-	-	-	-	-	-	2	0
Total		-	-	2	0	-	-	-	-	-	-	2	0

== Contract ==
- Atlético Mineiro
