= Fábio Cortez =

Brazilian football manager

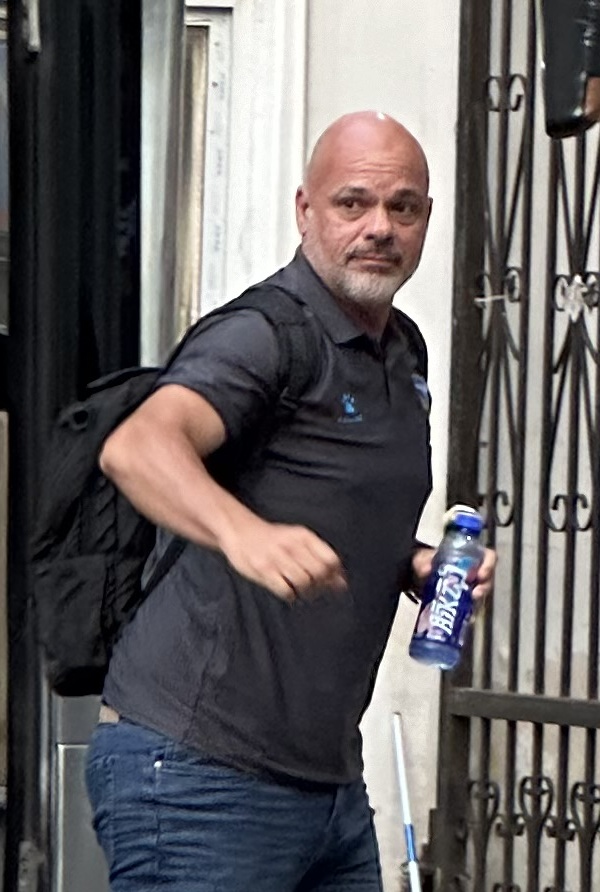
- Cortez in August 2024

Personal information
- Full name: Fábio Cortez Torres
- Date of birth: 3 April 1974 (age 52)
- Place of birth: Brazil

Managerial career
- Years: Team
- 2000–2003: Barra Futsal (futsal)
- 2003–2007: Vasco da Gama (futsal)
- 2008: Atlético Mineiro (youth)
- 2009: Colégio Pentágono (futsal)
- 2010: Vasco da Gama (futsal)
- 2010–2016: Qadsia (futsal)
- 2011–2012: Kuwait (futsal)
- 2017–2018: Vasco da Gama U20 (assistant)
- 2018–2021: Vasco da Gama U16
- 2021–2022: Vasco da Gama (assistant)
- 2021: Vasco da Gama (interim)
- 2021: Vasco da Gama (interim)
- 2023: Remo (assistant)
- 2023: Remo (interim)
- 2024: Nanjing City (assistant)
- 2024: Nanjing City
- 2025–2026: Santa Cruz (assistant)
- 2026: Santa Cruz (interim)

Fábio Cortez Torres (born 3 April 1974) is a Brazilian football coach.

== Career ==
Cortez was a futsal player before switching to coaching with Barra Futsal. He then coached Vasco da Gama until 2008, when he switched to football with Atlético Mineiro.

In 2010, shortly after his return to Vasco's futsal section, Cortez accepted an offer from the Kuwait national futsal team to work as their coach; he was also in charge of Qadsia. He returned to Vasco in 2017, as an assistant of the under-20 football side; in 2018, he was named coach of the under-16 team.

On 27 February 2021, Cortez was named Marcelo Cabo's assistant in the main squad. On 16 June, he was in charge of the side in a 0–2 Série B home loss against Avaí, after Cabo and his assistant Gabriel Cabo were sent off.

On 11 November 2021, Cortez was named interim manager of Vasco until the end of the campaign, after Fernando Diniz was sacked. He returned to his former role after the appointment of Zé Ricardo as head coach for the 2022 season.

On 14 December 2022, Cortez moved to Remo as the club's permanent assistant manager. He was also an interim head coach of the side during the second leg of the 2023 Campeonato Paraense Finals, as the club lost the title to Águia de Marabá.

In 2024, Cortez moved abroad and joined Chinese side Nanjing City. Initially an assistant, he became the head coach of the club after Kim Jong-boo was sacked in May, but was himself replaced by Zhang Xiaofeng in September.

In 2025, Cortez returned to Brazil and joined Santa Cruz as an assistant.
