= Laranjeira (footballer) =

Brazilian footballer (born 2000)

Personal information
- Full name: João Victor Gomes Laranjeira Lima
- Date of birth: 15 March 2000 (age 26)
- Place of birth: Rio de Janeiro, Brazil
- Height: 1.81 m (5 ft 11 in)
- Position: Attacking midfielder

Youth career
- –2020: Vasco da Gama

Senior career*
| Years | Team | Apps | (Gls) |
| 2021–2023 | Vasco da Gama | 16 | (0) |
| 2023 | → Remo (loan) | 2 | (0) |
- * Club domestic league appearances and goals as of 4 March 2023

João Victor Gomes Laranjeira Lima (born 15 March 2000), known as Laranjeira, is a Brazilian footballer who plays as an attacking midfielder.

== Club career ==
Laranjeira signed a contract renewal with Vasco da Gama in February 2019, a three-year deal. He would have to wait two more years to make his professional debut, which came in a 1–0 loss to Portuguesa-RJ in the Campeonato Carioca.

His contract was again renewed in April 2022, this time for a year and a half. This extension was met with some backlash from Vasco de Gama fans, who felt Laranjeira had not done enough to deserve a new contract, and that the funds could go to renewing other players' contracts instead.

== Career statistics ==
=== Club ===
As of 4 March 2023.

Appearances and goals by club, season and competition
| Club | Season | League | | | State League | | Cup | | Continental | | Other | | Total | |
| Club | Season | Division | Apps | Goals | Apps | Goals | Apps | Goals | Apps | Goals | Apps | Goals | Apps | Goals |
|---|---|---|---|---|---|---|---|---|---|---|---|---|---|---|
| Vasco da Gama | 2021 | Série B | 1 | 0 | 10 (Note: Appearances in the Campeonato Carioca) | 0 | 0 | 0 | — | | 0 | 0 | 11 | 0 |
| Vasco da Gama | 2022 | Série B | 0 | 0 | 5 | 0 | 0 | 0 | — | | 0 | 0 | 5 | 0 |
| Vasco da Gama | 2023 | Série A | 0 | 0 | 0 | 0 | 0 | 0 | — | | 0 | 0 | 0 | 0 |
| Career total | | | 1 | 0 | 15 | 0 | 0 | 0 | 0 | 0 | 0 | 0 | 16 | 0 |
