= Gustavo Bochecha =

Brazilian footballer (born 1996)

Personal information
- Full name: Gustavo Costa da Silva Machado
- Date of birth: 8 June 1996 (age 30)
- Place of birth: Maricá, Brazil
- Height: 1.73 m (5 ft 8 in)
- Position: Midfielder

Team information
- Current team: Inter de Limeira
- Number: 11

Youth career
- –2014: Duque de Caxias
- 2015–2017: Botafogo

Senior career*
Years	Team	Apps	(Gls)
2013–2014	Duque de Caxias	0	(0)
2017–2020	Botafogo	45	(0)
2020–2021	Juventude	45	(5)
2021–2023	Coritiba	23	(0)
2022	→ Novorizontino (loan)	31	(2)
2023	→ Portuguesa (loan)	8	(0)
2023	→ Remo (loan)	6	(1)
2024	Inter de Limeira	12	(3)
2024–2025	Botafogo-SP	37	(2)
2026–	Inter de Limeira	18	(0)
- * Club domestic league appearances and goals as of 9 November 2026

Gustavo Costa da Silva Machado (born 8 June 1996), known as Gustavo Bochecha or just Bochecha, is a Brazilian footballer who plays as a midfielder for Inter de Limeira.

== Career statistics ==
=== Club ===
As of 9 May 2023.

Club	Season	League			State League		Cup		Continental		Other		Total	
Club	Season	Division	Apps	Goals	Apps	Goals	Apps	Goals	Apps	Goals	Apps	Goals	Apps	Goals
Duque de Caxias	2013	Série C	0	0	0	0	0	0	—		1 (Note: Appearances in the Copa Rio)	0	1	0
Botafogo	2017	Série A	0	0	1 (Note: Appearances in the Campeonato Carioca)	0	0	0	—		—		1	0
Botafogo	2018	Série A	17	0	0	0	0	0	2 (Note: Appearances in the Copa Sudamericana)	0	—		19	0
Botafogo	2019	Série A	21	0	4	0	2 (Note: Appearances in the Copa do Brasil)	0	5	1	—		32	1
Botafogo	2020	Série A	0	0	2	0	0	0	0	0	—		2	0
Botafogo	Total		38	0	7	0	2	0	7	1	—		54	1
Juventude	2020	Série B	34	5	1 (Note: Appearances in the Campeonato Gaúcho)	0	5	0	—		—		40	5
Juventude	2021	Série A	0	0	10	0	2	0	—		—		12	0
Juventude	Total		34	5	11	0	7	0	—		—		52	5
Coritiba	2021	Série B	16	0	—		—		—		—		16	0
Coritiba	2022	Série A	0	0	7 (Note: Appearances in the Campeonato Paranaense)	0	1	0	—		—		8	0
Coritiba	Total		16	0	7	0	1	0	—		—		24	0
Novorizontino (loan)	2022	Série B	31	2	—		—		—		—		31	2
Portuguesa (loan)	2023	Paulista	—		8 (Note: Appearances in the Campeonato Paulista) (Note: Soccerway attribute one appearance to Gustavo Talles in the match against São Bento, but the player who featured in that match was Bochecha)	0	—		—		—		8	0
Remo (loan)	2023	Série C	1	0	—		—		—		—		1	0
Career total			130	7	33	0	10	0	7	1	1	0	171	8
