= Álvaro Rodrigues =

Brazilian footballer (born 1993)

Álvaro
Personal information
- Full name: Álvaro Rodrigues Vieira Júnior
- Date of birth: July 19, 1993 (age 33)
- Place of birth: São Paulo, Brazil
- Height: 1.75 m (5 ft 9 in)
- Position: Midfielder

Team information
- Current team: Centro Sportivo Alagoano
- Number: 7

Youth career
- Atlético Mineiro

Senior career*
Years	Team	Apps	(Gls)
2014	Tupi	5	(0)
2015	América-RN	29	(4)
2016	Nacional-AM	9	(1)
2016–2017	Confiança	35	(5)
2018–2019	Montedio Yamagata	28	(3)
2020	Matsumoto Yamaga	10	(0)
2021–2022	Confiança	57	(2)
2022	Brusque	22	(1)
2023	Ferroviária	6	(0)
2023	Remo	10	(0)
2024–	Barra FC	0	(0)
- * Club domestic league appearances and goals as of 19:38, 30 November 2022 (UTC)

Álvaro Rodrigues Vieira Júnior (born July 19, 1993) is a Brazilian football player who plays as a midfielder for Centro Sportivo Alagoano.

== Career statistics ==
Last update: end of 2018 season

Club performance			League		Cup		League Cup		Total	
Season	Club	League	Apps	Goals	Apps	Goals	Apps	Goals	Apps	Goals
Japan			League		Emperor's Cup		League Cup		Total	
2018	Montedio Yamagata	J2 League	21	3	2	0	-		23	3
2019	Montedio Yamagata	J2 League	0	0	0	0	-		0	0
Career total			21	3	2	0	-		23	3
