= Ícaro (footballer, born 1993) =

Brazilian footballer

Personal information
- Full name: Ícaro Cosmo da Rocha
- Date of birth: 5 August 1993 (age 33)
- Place of birth: Joinville, Brazil
- Height: 1.83 m (6 ft 0 in)
- Positions: Defensive midfielder; centre back

Team information
- Current team: Confiança

Youth career
- Coritiba

Senior career*
Years	Team	Apps	(Gls)
2014–2018	Coritiba	14	(0)
2017	→ Londrina (loan)	11	(0)
2018	→ Maringá (loan)	4	(0)
2019	Santo André	19	(3)
2019	Tombense	12	(0)
2019	Mirassol	4	(0)
2020	Aparecidense	27	(0)
2020	→ Portuguesa (loan)	4	(0)
2021	Brasil de Pelotas	37	(0)
2022	ABC	40	(2)
2023	Remo	6	(0)
2023	Sampaio Corrêa	8	(0)
2024	Remo	12	(1)
2024–2025	Floresta	44	(5)
2026–	Confiança	28	(4)
- * Club domestic league appearances and goals as of 11 November 2026

Ícaro Cosmo da Rocha, commonly known as Ícaro, is a Brazilian professional footballer who plays as a defensive midfielder and a defender for Confiança.
