= Diego Tavares =

Brazilian footballer (born 1991)

Personal information
- Full name: Diego Barbosa Tavares
- Date of birth: 6 July 1991 (age 35)
- Place of birth: Capitão Leônidas Marques, Brazil
- Height: 1.75 m (5 ft 9 in)
- Position: Forward

Team information
- Current team: Botafogo-PB
- Number: 11

Senior career*
Years	Team	Apps	(Gls)
2012	Iraty	1	(0)
2013	Nacional de Rolândia	8	(1)
2014	Blumenau	12	(3)
2015	Caldense	1	(0)
2016	Toledo	12	(1)
2016–2018	Paraná	55	(3)
2017	→ Avaí (loan)	13	(0)
2018	→ Botafogo-SP (loan)	3	(0)
2018–2019	Fortaleza	1	(0)
2020	São Bento	12	(2)
2020	Sampaio Corrêa	33	(2)
2021	São Bento	12	(4)
2021	Figueirense	18	(3)
2021	Vila Nova	17	(1)
2022	Inter de Limeira	14	(1)
2022	Vila Nova	31	(2)
2023	Remo	1	(0)
2023–2024	Brusque	69	(1)
2025	Paraná	8	(1)
2025–2026	Ponte Preta	39	(2)
2026–	Botafogo-PB	10	(0)
- * Club domestic league appearances and goals as of 8 November 2026

Diego Barbosa Tavares (born 6 July 1991), or simply Diego Tavares, is a Brazilian footballer who plays as a forward for Botafogo-PB.

== Honours ==
Fortaleza

- Campeonato Brasileiro Série B: 2018

Sampaio Corrêa

- Campeonato Maranhense: 2020

Figueirense

- Copa Santa Catarina: 2021
