= João Vieira (footballer, born 1997) =

Brazilian footballer

Personal information
- Full name: João Pedro Vieira
- Date of birth: 8 November 1997 (age 29)
- Place of birth: Pato Branco, Brazil
- Height: 1.71 m (5 ft 7 in)
- Position: Midfielder

Team information
- Current team: Vila Nova
- Number: 5

Youth career
- 2008–2017: Internacional

Senior career*
Years	Team	Apps	(Gls)
2017	Internacional	0	(0)
2018	São José-RS	8	(0)
2018–2022	Serra Macaense	12	(0)
2019	→ Internacional Madrid (loan)	5	(0)
2020	→ Esportivo (loan)	6	(1)
2020	→ Juventude (loan)	0	(0)
2021	→ Pelotas (loan)	9	(1)
2021	→ Caxias (loan)	16	(0)
2022	→ São Luiz (loan)	10	(0)
2022	→ Paysandu (loan)	20	(0)
2023–2024	Paysandu	80	(7)
2025–	Vila Nova	67	(11)
- * Club domestic league appearances and goals as of 14 April 2026

João Pedro Vieira (born 8 November 1997), known as João Vieira, is a Brazilian footballer who plays as a midfielder for Vila Nova.

== Career ==
Born in Pato Branco, Paraná, João Vieira joined Internacional's youth setup at the age of 11. He made his first team debut on 23 February 2017, coming on as a late substitute for goalscorer Andrigo in a 3–1 away win over Criciúma, for the year's Primeira Liga.

Ahead of the 2018 season, João Vieira moved to São José-RS. He subsequently spent a short period at Serra Macaense, before moving abroad with Spanish Segunda División B side Internacional de Madrid in the middle of 2019.

In January 2020, João Vieira returned to his home country after agreeing to a deal with Esportivo. He moved to Juventude in September, but only featured for their under-23 team.

João Vieira began the 2021 campaign at Pelotas, but was announced at Caxias on 28 May of that year. On 24 November, he agreed to a deal with São Luiz.

On 18 April 2022, João Vieira joined Paysandu. He immediately became a regular starter, and signed a permanent two-year contract with the club on 16 December, after Papão bought 70% of his economic rights from Serra Macaense.

== Career statistics ==
As of 14 November 2024.

Club	Season	League			State League		Cup		Continental		Other		Total	
Club	Season	Division	Apps	Goals	Apps	Goals	Apps	Goals	Apps	Goals	Apps	Goals	Apps	Goals
Internacional	2017	Série B	0	0	0	0	0	0	—		1 (Note: Appearance(s) in Primeira Liga)	0	1	0
São José-RS	2018	Série D	0	0	8	0	—		—		—		8	0
Serra Macaense	2018	Carioca Série B1	—		12	0	—		—		—		12	0
Internacional Madrid	2019–20	Segunda División B	5	0	—		—		—		1 (Note: Appearance(s) in Copa Federación de España)	0	6	0
Esportivo	2020	Gaúcho	—		6	1	—		—		—		6	1
Pelotas	2021	Gaúcho	—		9	1	—		—		—		9	1
Caxias	2021	Série D	16	0	—		—		—		—		16	0
São Luiz	2022	Série D	0	0	10	0	—		—		—		10	0
Paysandu	2022	Série C	20	0	—		—		—		6 (Note: Appearance(s) in Copa Verde)	1	26	1
Paysandu	2023	Série C	22	1	12	2	2	0	—		5	0	41	3
Paysandu	2024	Série B	33	4	13	0	2	0	—		7	2	55	6
Paysandu	Total		75	5	25	2	4	0	—		18	3	122	10
Career total			96	5	70	4	4	0	0	0	20	3	190	12

== Honours ==
Paysandu

- Copa Verde: 2022, 2024
- Campeonato Paraense: 2024
