= Diego Guerra =

Brazilian footballer (born 1990)

Personal information
- Full name: Diego Guerra Taixeirão
- Date of birth: November 6, 1990 (age 36)
- Place of birth: Rio de Janeiro, Brazil
- Height: 1.87 m (6 ft 2 in)
- Position: Centre back

Team information
- Current team: Portuguesa-RJ
- Number: 3

Senior career*
Years	Team	Apps	(Gls)
2010–2016	Friburguense		
2013	→ Macaé (loan)	6	(0)
2013–2014	→ Kazma (loan)	-	(-)
2016	→ Macaé (loan)	2	(0)
2017	Madureira	11	(0)
2017–2018	Tapachula	38	(3)
2019–2021	Portuguesa-RJ	54	(1)
2021	Botafogo-SP	60	(2)
2023	Remo	33	(0)
2023	Figueirense	7	(0)
2024–	Portuguesa-RJ	0	(0)
- * Club domestic league appearances and goals as of 25 November 2023

Diego Guerra Taixeirão (born November 6, 1990) is a Brazilian footballer who plays for Portuguesa-RJ as a defender.

== Honours ==
Cafetaleros de Tapachula

- Ascenso MX: Clausura 2018

Portuguesa

- 2021 Campeonato Carioca : 2021 Seleção Campeonato Carioca
