= Matheus Galdezani =

Brazilian footballer

Personal information
- Full name: Matheus Galdezani
- Date of birth: 13 March 1992 (age 34)
- Place of birth: Limeira, Brazil
- Height: 1.79 m (5 ft 10 1/2 in)
- Position: Defensive midfielder

Team information
- Current team: Inter de Limeira
- Number: 25

Youth career
- 2008–2009: Rio Branco-SP
- 2009–2011: Desportivo Brasil
- 2012: Paulista

Senior career*
Years	Team	Apps	(Gls)
2010–2011	Desportivo Brasil	7	(0)
2012–2013	Paulista	15	(1)
2014	Juventude	13	(0)
2015	Rio Claro	14	(1)
2015–2017	Mirassol	0	(0)
2015	→ Sport Recife (loan)	1	(0)
2016	→ CRB (loan)	47	(7)
2017	→ Coritiba (loan)	12	(1)
2017–2021	Coritiba	67	(1)
2018	→ Atlético Mineiro (loan)	23	(1)
2019	→ Internacional (loan)	0	(7)
2021	→ Bahia (loan)	11	(0)
2022	→ Inter de Limeira	12	(0)
2022	Avaí	6	(0)
2023	Ferroviária	7	(0)
2023	Remo	7	(0)
2024	Inter de Limeira	1	(0)
- * Club domestic league appearances and goals as of 18 May 2023

Matheus Galdezani (born 13 March 1992) is a Brazilian footballer who plays as defensive midfielder for Inter de Limeira.

== Club career ==
Galdezani was born in Limeira, São Paulo, and finished his formation with Desportivo Brasil. He made his first team debut on 29 May 2010, coming on as a second-half substitute in a 3–2 Campeonato Paulista Segunda Divisão away win against SEV Hortolândia.

Galdezani moved to Paulista in 2012; initially assigned to the youth setup, he started to feature for the senior squad in the 2012 Copa Paulista. Definitely promoted to the first team ahead of the 2013 Campeonato Paulista, he scored his first goal on 21 March of that year by netting the equalizer in a 2–1 away win against Guarani.

On 3 April 2014, Galdezani was presented at Juventude, featuring regularly during the year's Série C. On 27 October, he joined Rio Claro.

After impressing with Rio Claro, Galdezani signed for Série A side Sport on 18 June 2015. He made his debut in the category on 18 October, coming on as a second-half substitute for Ronaldo in a 4–1 home routing of Atlético Mineiro; it was his maiden appearance for the club.

On 8 January 2016, Galdezani agreed to a contract with CRB in the Série B. An undisputed starter, he featured in 34 league matches and scored four goals as his side finished five points away from promotion.

On 22 December 2016, Galdezani signed a one-year contract with Coritiba in the top tier. He scored his first goal in the first division the following 8 June, netting the game's only in a home success over Palmeiras.

On 16 June 2017, after being regularly used, Galdezani was bought outright by Coxa and extended his contract until 2020.

On 11 April 2018, Galdezani joined Atlético Mineiro on loan for the remainder of the 2018 season.

On 11 January 2019, Galdezani joined Internacional on a year-long loan, but suffered a knee injury in the day of his presentation and only returned to training in November; he left in December without playing a single match.

Galdezani spent the 2020 playing for his parent club Coritiba, suffering relegation from the top tier. On 19 March 2021, he signed for Bahia also in a temporary deal.

== Career statistics ==
As of 25 October 2021

Club	Season	League			State League		Cup		Conmebol		Other		Total	
Club	Season	Division	Apps	Goals	Apps	Goals	Apps	Goals	Apps	Goals	Apps	Goals	Apps	Goals
Desportivo Brasil	2010	Paulista 2ª Divisão	—		6	0	—		—		—		6	0
Desportivo Brasil	2011	Paulista 2ª Divisão	—		1	0	—		—		—		1	0
Desportivo Brasil	Total		—		7	0	—		—		—		7	0
Paulista	2012	Paulista	—		0	0	—		—		11 (Note: All appearance(s) in Copa Paulista)	0	11	0
Paulista	2013	Paulista	—		15	1	—		—		—		15	1
Paulista	Total		—		15	1	—		—		11	0	26	1
Juventude	2014	Série C	13	0	—		—		—		—		13	0
Rio Claro	2015	Paulista	—		14	1	—		—		—		14	1
Sport Recife	2015	Série A	1	0	—		—		0	0	—		1	0
CRB	2016	Série B	34	4	13	3	2	0	—		6 (Note: All appearance(s) in Copa do Nordeste)	0	55	7
Coritiba	2017	Série A	30	1	6	0	1	0	—		—		37	1
Coritiba	2018	Série B	0	0	6	0	0	0	—		—		6	0
Coritiba	2020	Série A	24	1	13	0	1	0	—		—		38	1
Coritiba	Total		54	2	25	0	2	0	—		—		81	2
Atlético Mineiro (loan)	2018	Série A	23	1	0	0	1	0	0	0	—		24	1
Internacional (loan)	2019	Série A	0	0	0	0	0	0	0	0	—		0	0
Bahia (loan)	2021	Série A	11	0	0	0	4	0	4 (Note: All appearance(s) in Copa Sudamericana)	0	6	0	25	0
Career total			136	7	74	5	9	0	4	0	23	0	246	12
