= Diego Ivo =

Brazilian footballer (born 1989)

Personal information
- Full name: Diego Ivo Pires
- Date of birth: 6 April 1989 (age 37)
- Place of birth: ibirapua , Brazil
- Height: 1.88 m (6 ft 2 in)
- Position: Centre back

Team information
- Current team: Amazonas

Youth career
- Avaí

Senior career*
Years	Team	Apps	(Gls)
2009–2011	Avaí	2	(0)
2009	→ Iguaçu (loan)	0	(0)
2011	→ Sport Barueri (loan)	0	(0)
2011–2012	Paulista	20	(3)
2012	Sport Recife	22	(0)
2013	Atlético Paranaense	2	(0)
2013–2014	Ceará	60	(5)
2015	Ponte Preta	6	(0)
2016	São Bernardo	11	(0)
2016–2017	Moreirense	13	(0)
2017–2018	Paysandu	60	(7)
2019	São Bento	7	(1)
2019	Juventude	6	(0)
2020	Novo Hamburgo	11	(2)
2020	Brasil de Pelotas	13	(1)
2021–2022	CRB	32	(1)
2023	Remo	29	(1)
2024	Confiança	4	(0)
2024	Avenida	7	(0)
2025	Paraná	7	(0)
2025	Treze	10	(0)
2026–	Amazonas	7	(0)
- * Club domestic league appearances and goals as of 10 November 2026

Diego Ivo Pires (born 6 April 1989) is a Brazilian footballer who plays as a central defender for Amazonas.

== Honours ==
Avaí

- Campeonato Catarinense: 2010

Ceará

- Campeonato Cearense: 2013, 2014

Moreirense

- Taça da Liga: 2016–17

Paysandu

- Copa Verde: 2018

CRB

- Campeonato Alagoano: 2022
