= Renan (footballer, born 2001) =

Brazilian footballer

Personal information
- Full name: Renan Pereira Muniz Oliveira
- Date of birth: 26 May 2001 (age 25)
- Place of birth: Araripina, Brazil
- Height: 1.74 m (5 ft 9 in)
- Position: Forward

Team information
- Current team: Nacional

Youth career
- –2018: Guarani

Senior career*
Years	Team	Apps	(Gls)
2019–2023	Guarani	60	(3)
2022	→ Manaus (loan)	13	(2)
2022	→ XV de Piracicaba (loan)		
2023	→ Cascavel (loan)	25	(1)
2023	→ Remo (loan)	6	(1)
2024–2025	Manaus	28	(6)
2026–	Nacional	20	(3)
- * Club domestic league appearances and goals as of 19 November 2026

Renan Pereira Muniz Oliveira (born 26 May 2001), commonly known as Renan or Renanzinho, is a Brazilian footballer who plays as a forward for Nacional.

== Career statistics ==
=== Club ===
As of 21 July 2019.

Club	Season	League			State League		Cup		Continental		Other		Total	
Club	Season	Division	Apps	Goals	Apps	Goals	Apps	Goals	Apps	Goals	Apps	Goals	Apps	Goals
Guarani	2019	Série B	2	0	0	0	0	0	–		0	0	2	0
Career total			2	0	0	0	0	0	0	0	0	0	2	0
