= Richard Franco =

Paraguayan footballer (born 1992)

Personal information
- Full name: Richard Darío Franco Escobar
- Date of birth: 16 July 1992 (age 34)
- Place of birth: Hernandarias, Paraguay
- Height: 1.84 m (6 ft 0 in)
- Position: Defensive midfielder

Team information
- Current team: ASA

Senior career*
Years	Team	Apps	(Gls)
2016	General Caballero	34	(4)
2017–2021	Sol de América	103	(13)
2019	→ Avaí (loan)	27	(1)
2020	→ CSA (loan)	12	(1)
2022	Náutico	38	(4)
2023	Remo	20	(3)
2024–2025	Retrô	46	(2)
2026–	ASA	15	(0)

International career
2016–	Paraguay	1	(0)
- * Club domestic league appearances and goals as of 19 November 2026

Richard Darío Franco Acosta Escobar (born 16 July 1992) is a Paraguayan footballer who plays as a defensive midfielder for ASA.

== Career ==
=== CSA ===
On 30 December 2019 CSA signed Franco for the 2020 season.

== Career statistics ==
=== Club ===
As of match played on 5 September 2020.

Club	Season	League			Cup		Continental		Other		Total	
Club	Season	Division	Apps	Goals	Apps	Goals	Apps	Goals	Apps	Goals	Apps	Goals
General Caballero	2016	Primera División	34	4	–		–		–		34	4
Sol de América	2017	Primera División	31	7	–		3 (Note: Appearance(s) in Copa Sudamericana.)	0	–		34	7
Sol de América	2018	Primera División	26	1	–		3	0	–		29	1
Sol de América	2019	Primera División	16	2	–		3	0	–		19	2
Sol de América	Total		73	10	0	0	9	0	0	0	82	10
Avaí (loan)	2019	Série A	27	1	–		–		–		27	1
CSA	2020	Série B	4	0	0	0	–		8 (Note: Seven appearances in Campeonato Alagoano, one appearance and one goal in Copa do Nordeste.)	1	12	1
Career Total			138	15	0	0	9	0	8	1	155	16

== Honours ==
=== Club ===
Náutico

- Campeonato Pernambucano: 2022

Retrô

- Campeonato Brasileiro Série D: 2024
