= Tapajós Futebol Clube =

Brazilian football club

Tapajós
- Full name: Tapajós Futebol Clube
- Nickname: Boto da Amazônia (Boto of the Amazon)
- Founded: 26 May 2014; 11 years ago
- Ground: Estádio Municipal Colosso do Tapajós
- Capacity: 8,000
- President: Sandicley Monte
- Head coach: Arthur Bernardes
- League: Campeonato Paraense
- 2022: Paraense, 8th of 12
Home colors	Away colors

Tapajós Futebol Clube, usually known as Tapajós, is a Brazilian football team from the city of Santarém, Pará.

== History ==
In 2014, shortly after their affiliation to the Pará Football Federation accepted, will play the second division of Campeonato Paraense.

In 2015, the team will play the main stage of the Campeonato Paraense for the first time in its history.

== Honours ==
- Campeonato Paraense Second Division
  - Winners (1): 2018
