= Itupiranga =

Coordinates: 5°09′S 49°20′W

- Municipality
- Flag
- Interactive map of Itupiranga
- Country: Brazil
- Region: Northern
- State: Pará
- Mesoregion: Sudeste Paraense

Population (2020)
  - Total: 53,355
- Time zone: UTC−3 (BRT)

Itupiranga is a municipality in the state of Pará in the Northern region of Brazil.

Meitajé, an extinct Jê language belonging to the Timbira group, was once spoken just to the northeast of Itupiranga.

== See also ==
- List of municipalities in Pará
