= Pedro Vitor =

Brazilian footballer

Personal information
- Full name: Pedro Vitor Ferreira da Silva
- Date of birth: 20 March 1998 (age 28)
- Place of birth: Palmeira dos Índios, Brazil
- Height: 1.77 m (5 ft 10 in)
- Position: Midfielder

Team information
- Current team: São Bernardo
- Number: 11

Youth career
- 2014–2017: Sport Recife

Senior career*
Years	Team	Apps	(Gls)
2017–2018	Sport Recife	1	(0)
2018	AEK Athens	0	(0)
2018–2019	Aris	0	(0)
2019–2020	Lviv	26	(3)
2020	→ KuPS (loan)	4	(0)
2021	Azuriz	4	(0)
2021–2024	Fortaleza	0	(0)
2021	→ Uberlândia (loan)	6	(0)
2022	→ Náutico (loan)	39	(2)
2023–2024	→ Remo (loan)	39	(8)
2025	Chungbuk Cheongju	35	(4)
2026–	São Bernardo	34	(6)
- * Club domestic league appearances and goals as of 18 November 2026

Pedro Vitor Ferreira da Silva, known as Pedro Vitor (born 20 March 1998) is a Brazilian footballer who plays for São Bernardo.

== Career statistics ==
As of 5 May 2025

Appearances and goals by club, season and competition
Club	Season	League			State league		National cup (Note: Includes Ukrainian Cup, Finnish Cup, Copa do Brasil)		League cup (Note: Includes Copa do Nordeste and Copa Verde)		Total	
Club	Season	Division	Apps	Goals	Apps	Goals	Apps	Goals	Apps	Goals	Apps	Goals
Sport Recife	2017		–		1 (Note: Includes Campeonato Pernambucano)	0	–		–		1	0
Aris	2018–19	Super League Greece	0	0	–		1	0	–		1	0
Lviv	2018–19	Ukrainian Premier League	13	2	–		1	0	–		14	2
Lviv	2019–20	Ukrainian Premier League	13	1	–		1	0	–		14	1
Lviv	Total		26	3	0	0	2	0	0	0	28	3
KuPS (loan)	2020	Veikkausliiga	4	0	–		3	0	–		7	0
Azuriz	2021		–		4 (Note: Includes Campeonato Paranaense)	0	–		–		4	0
Fortaleza	2021	Série A	0	0	0	0	0	0	–		0	0
Uberlândia (loan)	2021	Série D	6	0	0	0	0	0	–		6	0
Náutico (loan)	2022	Série B	33	2	6	0	1	0	6	1	46	3
Remo (loan)	2023	Série C	11	3	9 (Note: Includes Campeonato Paraense)	2	4	0	5	0	29	5
Remo (loan)	2024	Série C	18	3	1	0	0	0	0	0	19	3
Remo (loan)	Total		29	6	10	2	4	0	5	0	48	8
Chungbuk Cheongju	2025	K League 2	9	2	–		0	0	–		9	2
Career total			23	2	0	0	2	0	1	0	26	2

== Honours ==
Sport

- Campeonato Pernambucano: 2017

Náutico

- Campeonato Pernambucano: 2022

== Club career ==
He made his Campeonato Pernambucano debut for Sport Recife on 3 April 2017 in a game against Salgueiro.
