= Pablo Roberto =

Brazilian footballer

Personal information
- Full name: Pablo Roberto dos Santos Barbosa
- Date of birth: 14 November 1999 (age 27)
- Place of birth: São Francisco, Minas Gerais, Brazil
- Height: 1.83 m (6 ft 0 in)
- Position: Midfielder

Team information
- Current team: Juventude (on loan from Fortaleza)
- Number: 7

Youth career
- Atlético Goianiense

Senior career*
Years	Team	Apps	(Gls)
2019	Atlético Goianiense	3	(0)
2019	→ Portuguesa-RJ (loan)	8	(0)
2020–2023	Vila Nova	56	(4)
2021	→ Bahia (loan)	9	(1)
2022–2023	→ Remo (loan)	32	(1)
2023–2025	Casa Pia	52	(3)
2025–	Fortaleza	5	(0)
2026–	→ Juventude (loan)	12	(1)
- * Club domestic league appearances and goals as of 17 November 2026

Pablo Roberto dos Santos Barbosa (born 14 November 1999), or simply Pablo Roberto, is a Brazilian professional footballer who plays as a midfielder for Juventude, on loan from Fortaleza.

== Honours ==
Vila Nova

- Campeonato Brasileiro Série C: 2020
