= Rodrigo Silva (footballer, born 1987) =

Brazilian footballer

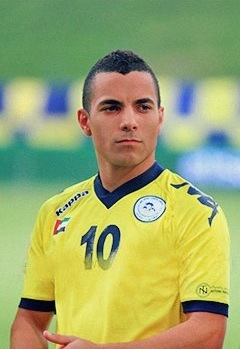
- Rodrigo Silva as an Al-Dhafra player in 2013.

Personal information
- Full name: Rodrigo Souza Silva
- Date of birth: 24 November 1987 (age 38)
- Place of birth: Ipatinga, Brazil
- Height: 1.69 m (5 ft 7 in)
- Position: Attacking midfielder

Team information
- Current team: Operário Ferroviário

Youth career
- 2004–2005: Atlético Mineiro

Senior career*
Years	Team	Apps	(Gls)
2005–2009	Atlético Mineiro		
2007	→ Democrata (loan)		
2007	→ Tupi (loan)		
2008	→ CRB (loan)		
2008	→ America (RJ) (loan)		
2008	→ Gama (loan)		
2009	→ Santa Helena (loan)		
2009–2010	Al-Nasr	20	(5)
2010–2012	Al-Khaleej	39	(20)
2012–2013	Al-Shaab	11	(5)
2013	→ Al-Dhafra (loan)	10	(0)
2013–2015	Emirates	39	(6)
2015	Al-Khaleej	4	(2)
2016	Hatta	12	(2)
2016	Ajman	12	(4)
2017	Daegu FC	2	(0)
2018	Remo	15	(3)
2018–2019	Khor Fakkan	-	(-)
2019–2020	Dibba Al-Hisn	3	(0)
2020–2021	Al Urooba	-	(-)
2021–2022	Al Bataeh	29	(9)
2023	Remo	27	(2)
2023–	Operário Ferroviário	0	(0)

International career
2014–2015	Timor-Leste	9	(1)
- * Club domestic league appearances and goals as of 26 August 2023

Rodrigo Souza Silva (born 24 November 1987), sometimes known as just Rodrigo, is a Brazilian footballer who plays as an attacking midfielder for Operário Ferroviário. Although he represented the Timor-Leste national team, he was later found ineligible by the Asian Football Confederation.

== Club career ==
=== Youth career ===
Born and raised in Ipatinga, Brazil, Rodrigo Silva began his career as a football player in 2004 with Brazilian top club, Clube Atlético Mineiro where he played for the next 3 years. During his three-year spell with the Belo Horizonte-based club, he was promoted to and then brought back to the youth three times from 2004 to 2007. With the youth team, he helped the club win the Campeonato Mineiro Sub-20 (Junior) three times in a row in 2005, 2006 and 2007.

=== Brazil ===
Having shown a great performance with the youth teams of Clube Atlético Mineiro, Rodrigo Silva was promoted to the first team of the club in 2005 and was under a long-term contract of 4 years with the club.

In January 2007, he moved on a short-term loan deal of four months to Campeonato Mineiro club, Esporte Clube Democrata.

In August 2007, he moved on a one-month loan deal to Campeonato Carioca club, Tupi Football Club and then returned to his parent club, Clube Atlético Mineiro for the remaining of the 2007-08 season.

In January 2008, he again moved out of Clube Atlético Mineiro and this time on a two-month loan deal to Clube de Regatas Brasil and then moved on loan to America Football Club till June 2008. In July 2008, he moved on loan to Campeonato Brasileiro Série B club, Sociedade Esportiva do Gama where he played till November 2008.

He then played from February to May in 2009 for Santa Helena de Goiás-based, Santa Helena Esporte Clube and then returned to his parent club, Clube Atlético Mineiro for the remaining of the 2008-2009 season thus ending his five-year spell with the Belo Horizonte-based club in which he spent majority of his time with other top Brazilian clubs.

=== Kuwait ===
Rodrigo Silva first moved out of Brazil in 2009 to the Middle East and more accurately to Kuwait where he signed a one-and-a-half-year contract with Kuwaiti Premier League club, Al-Nasr SC. He scored his first goal for the club in the 2009–10 Kuwaiti Premier League on 2 December 2009 in a 4–1 win against Kuwaiti top club, Al-Kuwait SC.

In his second consecutive season with the Al-Farwaniyah-based club, he scored his first and only goal in the 2010–11 Kuwaiti Premier League on 29 August 2010 in a 3–1 loss against Al-Qadsia SC.

=== United Arab Emirates ===
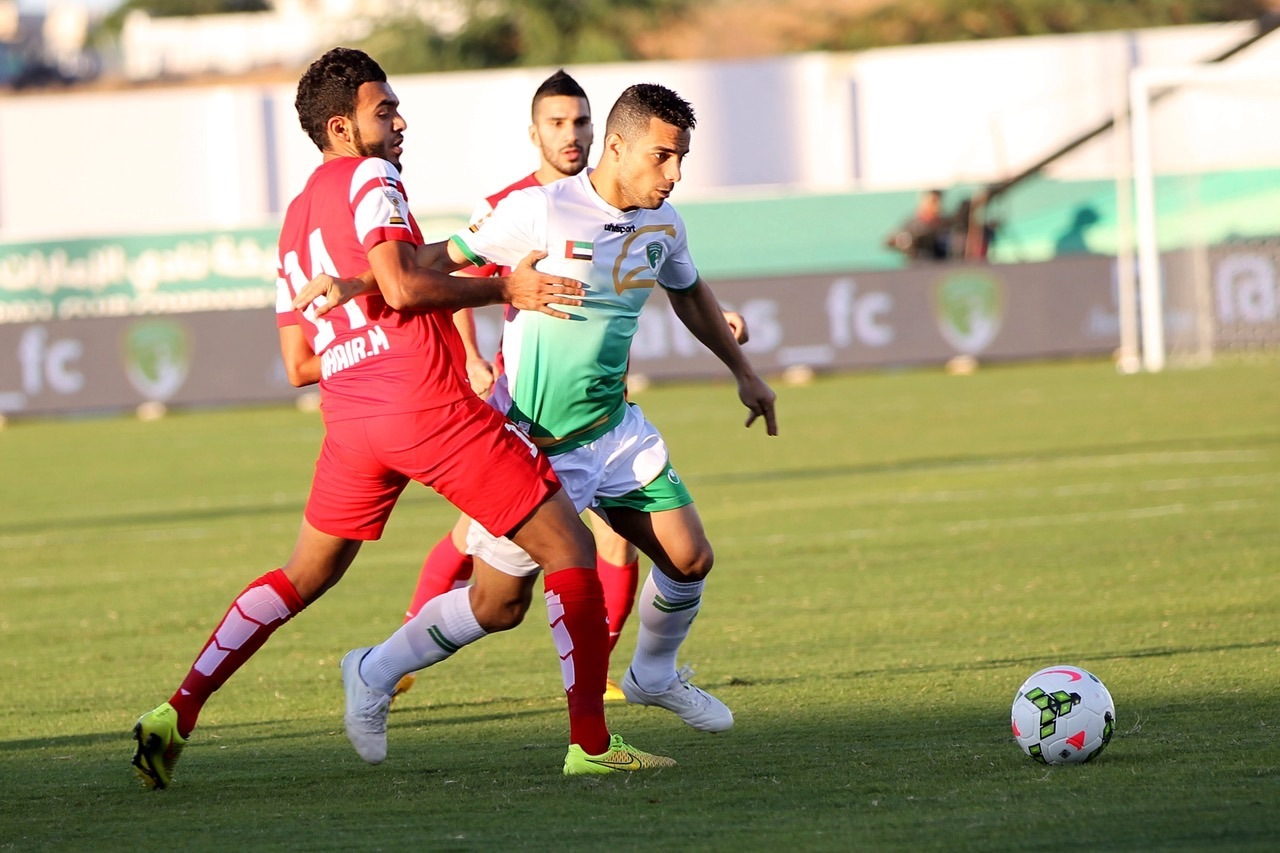
Rodrigo Souza Silva - Emirates Club

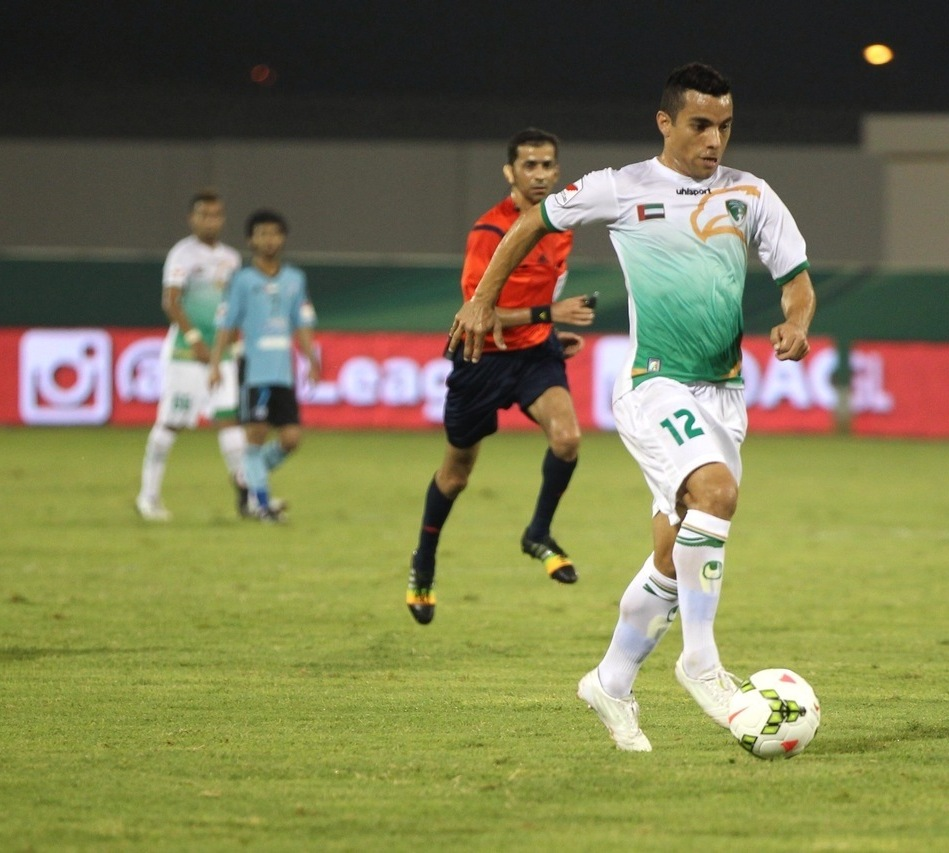
Rodrigo Souza Silva - Emirates Club

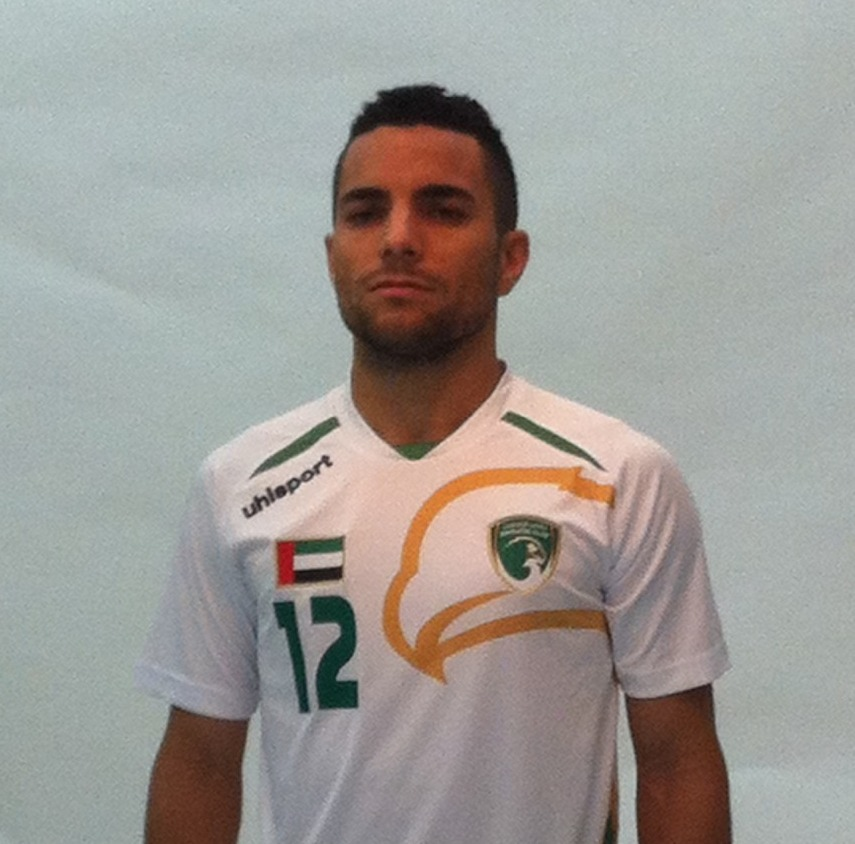
Pre-Season Emirates Club

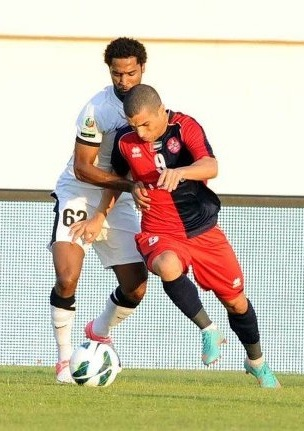
Against Al-Ahli Dubai F.C.

In 2010, Rodrigo Silva again moved out of Brazil to a Middle Eastern country and this time to the United Arab Emirates where he signed a two-year contract with UAE First Division League club, Al-Khaleej Club. He made his debut and scored his first goal for the club on 26 August 2010 in a 2010–11 Etisalat Emirates Cup qualification match in a 1–0 win over Al-Fujairah SC. He also made an appearance and scored a goal in the 2010–11 UAE President's Cup in Round 1 on 21 September 2010 in a 4–1 loss against Baniyas F.C. He made his UAE First Division League debut and scored his first goal in the competition on 9 December 2010 in a 3–3 draw against the Emirates Club. He scored 10 goals in 20 appearances in the 2010-11 UAE First Division League. He also scored 10 goals in 13 appearances in the qualification to the 2010–11 Etisalat Emirates Cup.

In his second consecutive season for the club, he made his first appearance for the club on 30 September 2011 in a 2011–12 Etisalat Emirates Cup qualification match in a 3–3 draw against Al-Ittihad Kalba SC. He made his first appearance and scored his first goal in the 2011-12 UAE First Division League on 24 November 2011 in a 4–0 win over Al-Urooba. He also made an appearance in the 2011–12 UAE President's Cup in Round of 16 on 18 December 2011 in a 2–1 loss against Al-Sharjah SCC. He scored 10 goals in 19 appearances in the 2011–12 UAE First Division League. He also scored made four appearances in qualification to the 2011–12 Etisalat Emirates Cup.

In 2012, he moved to the Emirate of Sharjah where he signed a one-year contract with UAE Pro-League club, Al-Shaab CSC. He first helped the Sharjah-based club qualify for the UAE Pro-League by scoring two goals in three Quartet League qualifying matches. He made his UAE Pro-League debut and scored his first goal for the club in the competition on 24 September 2012 in a 4–0 win over Al-Ittihad Kalba SC. He also made his Etisalat Emirates Cup debut on 10 October 2012 in a 6–1 loss against Al-Wahda F.C. He also made an appearance in the 2012–13 UAE President's Cup in the Round of 16 on 19 December 2012 in a 4–1 loss against Al-Wahda F.C. He scored five goals in eleven appearances in the 2012–13 UAE Pro-League and also made five appearances in the 2012–13 Etisalat Emirates Cup for the Sharjah-based club.

In 2013, he moved to Madinat Zayed where he moved to another UAE Pro-League club, Al-Dhafra SCC on a six-month loan deal. He made his debut for the club on 5 April 2013 in a 3–0 win over Ajman Club. He also made an appearance for the reserve team of the club on 10 May 2013 in a 3–2 win over the reserve team of Al-Wahda F.C. He made ten appearances for the Madinat Zayed-based club in the 2012–13 UAE Pro-League.

In June 2013, he moved to Ras al-Khaimah and on 1 July 2013 he signed a two-year contract with UAE Arabian Gulf League club, Emirates Club. He made his debut for the club on 9 September 2013 in a UAE League Cup match in a 1–1 draw against Al-Ahli Dubai F.C. He made his UAE Arabian Gulf League on 14 September 2013 in a 3–1 win over his former club, Al-Dhafra SCC and scored his first goal in the competition on 31 October 2013 in a 5–2 win over his former club, Al-Shaab CSC. He also made an appearance in the 2013–14 UAE President's Cup on 10 December 2013 in a 3–1 loss against Al-Ahli Dubai F.C. He scored 3 goals in 25 appearances in the 2013–14 Arabian Gulf League. He also made 5 appearances in the 2013–14 UAE Arabian Gulf Cup.

In his second consecutive season for the club, he made his first appearance on 15 September 2014 in a 1–0 win over Al-Fujairah SC and scored his first goal of the season on 5 October 2014 in a 1–1 draw against his former club, Al-Dhafra SCC. He made his first appearance in the 2014–15 UAE Arabian Gulf Cup on 5 November 2014 in a 2–1 loss against Baniyas F.C. and scored his first goal in his second game in the competition on 11 November 2014 in a 2–2 draw against Al-Fujairah SC.

=== Club career statistics ===
Club	Season	Division	League		Cup		Continental		Other		Total	
Club	Season	Division	Apps	Goals	Apps	Goals	Apps	Goals	Apps	Goals	Apps	Goals
Al-Nasr	2009–10	Kuwaiti Premier League	20	4	8	0	0	0	0	0	28	4
Al-Nasr	2010–11	Kuwaiti Premier League	—	1	0	0	0	0	0	0	—	1
Al-Nasr	Total		20	5	8	0	0	0	0	0	28	5
Al-Khaleej	2010–11	UAE First Division League	20	10	14	11	0	0	0	0	34	21
Al-Khaleej	2011–12	UAE First Division League	19	10	5	0	0	0	0	0	24	10
Al-Khaleej	Total		39	20	19	11	0	0	0	0	58	31
Al-Shaab	2012–13	UAE Pro-League	14	7	6	0	0	0	0	0	20	7
Al-Shaab	Total		14	7	6	0	0	0	0	0	20	7
Al-Dhafra	2012–13	UAE Pro-League	10	0	0	0	0	0	0	0	10	0
Al-Dhafra	Total		10	0	0	0	0	0	0	0	10	0
Emirates	2013–14	UAE Arabian Gulf League	25	4	6	0	0	0	0	0	31	4
Emirates	2014–15	UAE Arabian Gulf League	14	2	5	1	0	0	0	0	19	3
Emirates	Total		39	6	11	1	0	0	0	0	50	7
Al-Khaleej	2015–16	UAE First Division League	4	2	7	1	0	0	0	0	11	3
Al-Khaleej	Total		4	2	7	1	0	0	0	0	11	3
Hatta	2015–16	UAE First Division League	12	2	0	0	0	0	0	0	12	2
Hatta	Total		12	2	0	0	0	0	0	0	12	2
Ajman	2015–16	UAE First Division League	7	0	5	4	0	0	0	0	12	4
Ajman	Total		7	0	5	4	0	0	0	0	12	4
Career total			145	42	56	17	0	0	0	0	191	59

== International career ==
On 19 January 2017, the Asian Football Confederation declared Rodrigo and eleven other Brazilian men's footballers ineligible to represent East Timor.

=== International goals ===
Scores and results list East Timor's goal tally first.

Goal	Date	Venue	Opponent	Score	Result	Competition
1.	12 March 2015	National Stadium, Dili, East Timor	Mongolia	3–0	4–1	2018 FIFA World Cup qualification

== Honours ==
=== Club ===
- With Atlético Mineiro (As a Youth Team player)

- Campeonato Mineiro Sub-20 (3): 2005, 2006, 2007

- With Democrata

- Campeonato do Interior de Minas Gerais (1): 2007

== Contract ==
- CRB (Loan) 2 January 2008 to 30 November 2008
- Atlético Mineiro 12 April 2004 to 6 April 2009
