= Lucas Mendes (footballer, born 1991) =

Brazilian footballer

Personal information
- Full name: Lucas Pereira Mendes
- Date of birth: 28 February 1991 (age 35)
- Place of birth: Feira de Santana, Brazil
- Height: 1.77 m (5 ft 10 in)
- Position: Right back

Team information
- Current team: Londrina

Youth career
- 2007-2008: Cruzeiro
- 2009-2010: Bahia

Senior career*
Years	Team	Apps	(Gls)
2011–2013	Bahia	6	(0)
2011	→ Oeste (loan)	11	(0)
2013	→ Olaria Atlético Clube (loan)	12	(0)
2013	→ Luverdense (loan)	3	(0)
2014	Ypiranga–BA		
2014	Santa Rita	4	(0)
2014	Aliança–AL		
2014	Serrano		
2015	Botafogo–PB	5	(0)
2015	Estanciano	5	(0)
2016	Uniclinic	10	(0)
2017	Iporá	13	(0)
2017	Anapolina		
2018	Concórdia	16	(0)
2018–2019	Ferroviário	52	(0)
2019	São Caetano	9	(0)
2020–2021	Ferroviária	31	(0)
2021	→ Operário-PR (loan)	23	(1)
2021–2022	Operário-PR	35	(2)
2023	Remo	12	(1)
2023–	Londrina	7	(0)
- * Club domestic league appearances and goals as of 3 November 2023

Lucas Pereira Mendes (born 28 February 1991), known as Lucas Mendes, is a Brazilian footballer who plays as a right back for Londrina.

== Career statistics ==
=== Club ===
As of 13 August 2020

Club	Season	League			State League		Cup		Continental		Other		Total	
Club	Season	Division	Apps	Goals	Apps	Goals	Apps	Goals	Apps	Goals	Apps	Goals	Apps	Goals
Bahia	2011	Série A	–		2	0	0	0	–		–		2	0
Bahia	2013	Série A	–		–		1	0	–		–		1	0
Bahia	Total		–		2	0	1	0	–		–		3	0
Oeste (loan)	2011	Série D	11	0	–		–		–		–		11	0
Olaria (loan)	2013	Carioca	–		12	0	–		–		–		12	0
Luverdense (loan)	2013	Série C	3	0	–		–		–		–		3	0
Santa Rita	2014	Alagoano	–		–		4	0	–		–		4	0
Botafogo–PB	2015	Série C	0	0	–		0	0	–		2 (Note: Appearances in the Copa do Nordeste)	0	2	0
Estanciano	2015	Série D	5	0	–		–		–		–		5	0
Uniclinic	2016	Série D	2	0	9	0	–		–		–		11	0
Iporá	2017	Goiano	–		13	0	–		–		–		13	0
Concórdia	2018	Catarinense	–		16	0	–		–		–		16	0
Ferroviário	2018	Série D	15	0	–		1	0	–		–		16	0
Ferroviário	2019	Série C	16	0	9	0	–		–		–		25	0
Ferroviário	Total		31	0	9	0	1	0	–		–		41	0
São Caetano	2019	Série D	–		–		–		–		9 (Note: Appearances in the Copa Paulista)	0	9	0
Ferroviária	2020	Série D	–		13	0	3	0	–		–		16	0
Career total			52	0	74	0	9	0	0	0	11	0	146	0
