= 2026 Copa Norte finals =

- Event: 2026 Copa Norte
Paysandu	Nacional
(Pará)	(Amazonas (Brazilian state))
5	2
- on aggregate

First leg
Paysandu	Nacional
1	0
- Date: 20 May 2026
- Venue: Mangueirão, Belém
- Referee: Alisson Sidnei Furtado
- Attendance: 33,143

Second leg
Nacional	Paysandu
2	4
- Date: 28 May 2026
- Venue: Estádio Municipal Carlos Zamith, Manaus
- Referee: Paulo Henrique Schleich Vollkopf
- Attendance: 6,132

The 2026 Copa Norte finals was the final two-legged tie that decided the 2026 Copa Norte, the 7th season of the Copa Norte, Brazil's regional cup football tournament organised by the Brazilian Football Confederation. The 2026 edition marked the return of the competition, which has not been held since 2002.

The finals were contested between Paysandu, from Pará, and Nacional, from Amazonas.

Paysandu defeated Nacional 5–2 on aggregate to win their second title and a place in the third round of the 2027 Copa do Brasil and earned the right to play against 2026 Copa Centro-Oeste winners Anápolis in the 2026 Copa Verde.

== Teams ==
Team	Previous finals appearances (bold indicates winners)
(Pará) Paysandu	2 (2001, **2002**)
(Amazonas (Brazilian state)) Nacional	None

=== Road to the final ===
Note: In all scores below, the score of the finalist is given first.

(Pará) Paysandu			Round	(Amazonas (Brazilian state)) Nacional		
Opponent	Venue	Score		Opponent	Venue	Score
Pos / Team / Pld / Pts; 1 / (Amazonas (Brazilian state)) Nacional (A) / 5 / 13; **2** / (Pará) Paysandu (A) / **5** / 9; 3 / (Rondônia) Guaporé / 5 / 7; 4 / (Amapá) Trem / 5 / 6; 5 / (Acre (state)) Independência / 5 / 5; 6 / (Roraima) GAS / 5 / 3; Updated to match(es) played on 29 April 2026. Source: CBF (A) Advance to a further round			Group stage	Pos / Team / Pld / Pts; **1** / (Amazonas (Brazilian state)) Nacional (A) / **5** / 13; 2 / (Pará) Paysandu (A) / 5 / 9; 3 / (Rondônia) Guaporé / 5 / 7; 4 / (Amapá) Trem / 5 / 6; 5 / (Acre (state)) Independência / 5 / 5; 6 / (Roraima) GAS / 5 / 3; Updated to match(es) played on 29 April 2026. Source: CBF (A) Advance to a further round		
(Pará) Águia de Marabá	Away	5–1	Semi-finals	(Rondônia) Porto Velho	Home	1–1 (2–0 p)

== Format ==
The finals were played on a home-and-away two-legged basis. If tied on aggregate, the penalty shoot-out was used to determine the winner.

== Matches ==
=== First leg ===
20 May 2026
20:00 BRT (UTC−3)

Paysandu (Pará)	1–0	(Amazonas (Brazilian state)) Nacional
Castro 52'	Report

Mangueirão, Belém
Attendance: 33,143
Referee: Alisson Sidnei Furtado (Tocantins)

Paysandu	Nacional

GK	12	(Brazil) Gabriel Mesquita
DF	2	(Brazil) Edílson
DF	15	(Brazil) Castro
DF	3	(Uruguay) Yeferson Quintana
DF	31	(Uruguay) Facundo Bonifazi
MF	39	(Brazil) Pedro Henrique	(yellow card) 21'	(substituted off) 83'
MF	8	(Brazil) Caio Mello
MF	10	(Brazil) Marcinho (c)		(substituted off) 69'
FW	30	(Brazil) Thalyson		(substituted off) 69'
FW	75	(Brazil) Kleiton Pego		(substituted off) 83'
FW	9	(Brazil) Ítalo		(substituted off) 69'
Substitutes:
GK	41	(Brazil) Marcão
DF	4	(Brazil) Iarley
DF	14	(Brazil) Bruno Bispo
DF	77	(Brazil) Luciano Taboca
MF	5	(Brazil) Henrico
MF	20	(Brazil) Matheus Capixaba
MF	23	(Brazil) Brian		(substituted on) 83'
MF	25	(Brazil) Tiago Índio
MF	96	(Brazil) Matheus Vargas		(substituted on) 83'
MF	99	(Brazil) Lucas Cardoso		(substituted on) 69'
FW	19	(Brazil) Thayllon		(substituted on) 69'
FW	98	(Brazil) Juninho		(substituted on) 69'
Coach:
(Brazil) Júnior Rocha

GK	1	(Brazil) Caio
DF	14	(Brazil) Ryan Santos	(yellow card) 35'	(substituted off) 70'
DF	4	(Brazil) Thiago Lopes
DF	3	(Brazil) Michel Custódio
DF	6	(Brazil) Wendel
MF	17	(Brazil) Miliano	(yellow card) 4'	(substituted off) 46'
MF	5	(Brazil) Rodrigo (c)
MF	8	(Brazil) Erick Varão
MF	11	(Brazil) Renanzinho		(substituted off) 59'
FW	9	(Brazil) Rafa Marcos		(substituted off) 82'
FW	18	(Brazil) Vitinho		(substituted off) 46'
Substitutes:
GK	12	(Brazil) Igor Rayan
DF	2	(Brazil) João Barbieri		(substituted on) 70'
DF	13	(Brazil) Anderson Alagoano		(substituted on) 46'
DF	15	(Brazil) Fredson
DF	16	(Brazil) Mateus Müller
MF	7	(Brazil) PH
MF	26	(Brazil) Ícaro Alves
FW	20	(Brazil) Caio Mancha		(substituted on) 59'
FW	21	(Brazil) Douglas		(substituted on) 82'
FW	23	(Ecuador) Kevin Mercado		(substituted on) 46'
FW	28	(Brazil) Max
Coach:
(Brazil) Júlio César Nunes

Assistant referees:
Fábio Pereira (Tocantins)
Samuel Smith Nóbrega Silva (Tocantins)
Fourth official:
Dewson Fernando Freitas da Silva (Pará)
Fifth official:
Thânia Lopes da Silva (Pará)
Video assistant referee:
Wanbelton Lisboa Valente (Pará)
Assistant video assistant referee:
Luís Diego Nascimento Lopes (Pará)

=== Second leg ===
28 May 2026
20:00 AMT (UTC−4)

Nacional (Amazonas (Brazilian state))	2–4	(Pará) Paysandu
Kaio Wilker 65', 75'	Report	Caio Mello 10'; Kleiton Pego 26'; Thayllon 50'; Marcinho 81'

Estádio Municipal Carlos Zamith, Manaus
Attendance: 6,132
Referee: Paulo Henrique Schleich Vollkopf (Mato Grosso do Sul)

Nacional	Paysandu

GK	1	(Brazil) Caio
DF	14	(Brazil) Ryan Santos
DF	3	(Brazil) Michel Custódio
DF	4	(Brazil) Thiago Lopes		(substituted off) 90+5'
DF	6	(Brazil) Wendel
MF	17	(Brazil) Miliano
MF	5	(Brazil) Rodrigo (c)	(yellow card) 11'	(substituted off) 46'
MF	8	(Brazil) Erick Varão	(yellow card) 45+3'
MF	11	(Brazil) Renanzinho	(yellow card) 69'	(substituted off) 85'
FW	9	(Brazil) Rafa Marcos		(substituted off) 64'
FW	20	(Brazil) Caio Mancha		(substituted off) 46'
Substitutes:
GK	12	(Brazil) Igor Rayan
DF	2	(Brazil) João Barbieri
DF	13	(Brazil) Anderson Alagoano
DF	15	(Brazil) Fredson
DF	16	(Brazil) Mateus Müller
MF	10	(Brazil) Kaio Wilker	(yellow card) 85'	(substituted on) 46'
MF	19	(Brazil) PH
FW	7	(Brazil) Giva		(substituted on) 46'
FW	18	(Brazil) Vitinho		(substituted on) 64'
FW	21	(Brazil) Douglas
FW	23	(Ecuador) Kevin Mercado		(substituted on) 85'
FW	28	(Brazil) Ryan Luka		(substituted on) 90+5'
Coach:
(Brazil) Júlio César Nunes

GK	12	(Brazil) Gabriel Mesquita
DF	2	(Brazil) Edílson
DF	15	(Brazil) Castro
DF	3	(Uruguay) Yeferson Quintana	(yellow card) 42'	(substituted off) 56'
DF	31	(Uruguay) Facundo Bonifazi		(substituted off) 79'
MF	39	(Brazil) Pedro Henrique
MF	8	(Brazil) Caio Mello		(substituted off) 46'
MF	10	(Brazil) Marcinho (c)	(yellow card) 81'
FW	30	(Brazil) Thalyson		(substituted off) 46'
FW	75	(Brazil) Kleiton Pego		(substituted off) 72'
FW	9	(Brazil) Ítalo
Substitutes:
GK	41	(Brazil) Marcão
DF	4	(Brazil) Iarley
DF	14	(Brazil) Bruno Bispo		(substituted on) 56'
DF	77	(Brazil) Luciano Taboca		(substituted on) 79'
MF	5	(Brazil) Henrico
MF	23	(Brazil) Brian	(yellow card) 53'	(substituted on) 46'
MF	96	(Brazil) Matheus Vargas
MF	99	(Brazil) Lucas Cardoso		(substituted on) 72'
FW	19	(Brazil) Thayllon	(yellow card) 67'	(substituted on) 46'
FW	98	(Brazil) Juninho
Coach:
(Brazil) Júnior Rocha

Assistant referees:
Eduardo Gonçalves da Cruz (Mato Grosso do Sul)
Carlos Eduardo Ribeiro Santos (Mato Grosso)
Fourth official:
Antônio Carlos Pequeno Frutuoso (Amazonas)
Fifth official:
Noélia Chaves da Paixão (Amazonas)
Video assistant referee:
Márcio Henrique de Góis (São Paulo)
Assistant video assistant referee:
José Reinaldo Nascimento Júnior (Distrito Federal)
Rafael Martins Diniz (Distrito Federal)

== See also ==
- 2026 Copa Centro-Oeste
- 2026 Copa do Nordeste
- 2026 Copa Sul-Sudeste
- 2026 Copa Verde
