= 2026 Copa Centro-Oeste finals =

- Event: 2026 Copa Centro-Oeste
Anápolis	Rio Branco
(Goiás)	(Espírito Santo)
4	2
- on aggregate

First leg
Anápolis	Rio Branco
3	0
- Date: 21 May 2026
- Venue: Estádio Jonas Duarte, Anápolis
- Referee: Paulo Henrique Schleich Vollkopf
- Attendance: 2,823

Second leg
Rio Branco	Anápolis
2	1
- Date: 27 May 2026
- Venue: Estádio Kleber Andrade, Cariacica
- Referee: Thaillan Azevedo Gomes
- Attendance: 3,378

The 2026 Copa Centro-Oeste finals was the final two-legged tie that decided the 2026 Copa Centro-Oeste, the 5th season of the Copa Centro-Oeste, Brazil's regional cup football tournament organised by the Brazilian Football Confederation. The 2026 edition marked the return of the competition, which has not been held since 2002.

The finals were contested between Anápolis, from Goiás, and Rio Branco, from Espírito Santo.

Anápolis defeated Rio Branco 4–2 on aggregate to win their first title and a place in the third round of the 2027 Copa do Brasil and earned the right to play against 2026 Copa Norte winners Paysandu in the 2026 Copa Verde.

== Teams ==
Team	Previous finals appearances (bold indicates winners)
(Goiás) Anápolis	None
(Espírito Santo) Rio Branco	None

=== Road to the final ===
Note: In all scores below, the score of the finalist is given first.

(Goiás) Anápolis			Round	(Espírito Santo) Rio Branco		
Opponent	Venue	Score		Opponent	Venue	Score
Pos / Team / Pld / Pts; 1 / (Federal District (Brazil)) Gama (A) / 5 / 15; **2** / (Goiás) Anápolis (A) / **5** / 9; 3 / (Goiás) Atlético Goianiense / 5 / 7; 4 / (Espírito Santo) Porto Vitória / 5 / 7; 5 / (Tocantins) Tocantinópolis / 5 / 3; 6 / (Mato Grosso) Cuiabá / 5 / 1; Updated to match(es) played on 29 April 2026. Source: CBF (A) Advance to a further round			Group stage	Pos / Team / Pld / Pts; 1 / (Goiás) Vila Nova (A) / 5 / 8; **2** / (Espírito Santo) Rio Branco (A) / **5** / 8; 3 / (Mato Grosso do Sul) Operário / 5 / 8; 4 / (Tocantins) Araguaína / 5 / 7; 5 / (Federal District (Brazil)) Capital / 5 / 6; 6 / (Mato Grosso) Primavera / 5 / 2; Updated to match(es) played on 29 April 2026. Source: CBF (A) Advance to a further round		
(Goiás) Vila Nova	Away	1–1 (4–3 p)	Semi-finals	(Federal District (Brazil)) Gama	Away	1–0

== Format ==
The finals were played on a home-and-away two-legged basis. If tied on aggregate, the penalty shoot-out was used to determine the winner.

== Matches ==
=== First leg ===
21 May 2026
20:00 BRT (UTC−3)

Anápolis (Goiás)	3–0	(Espírito Santo) Rio Branco
Fernandinho 59'; Juninho 86'; Igor Souza 90+4'	Report

Estádio Jonas Duarte, Anápolis
Attendance: 2,823
Referee: Paulo Henrique Schleich Vollkopf (Mato Grosso do Sul)

Anápolis	Rio Branco

GK	12	(Brazil) Ravel
DF	2	(Brazil) Rubinho
DF	13	(Brazil) Kauan Martins
DF	14	(Brazil) Igor Souza
DF	16	(Brazil) Júlio Gouvêa
MF	15	(Brazil) Kauan Guilherme	(yellow card) 47'	(substituted off) 60'
MF	8	(Brazil) Vitor Fonseca	(yellow card) 54'	(substituted off) 60'
MF	10	(Brazil) Juninho
FW	7	(Brazil) Matheus Lagoa (c)		(substituted off) 75'
FW	11	(Brazil) Fernandinho	(yellow card) 60'	(substituted off) 60'
FW	19	(Brazil) Fernando Viana		(substituted off) 75'
Substitutes:
GK	23	(Brazil) Victor Hugo
DF	3	(Brazil) Hélder
DF	33	(Brazil) Robson Reis
MF	5	(Brazil) Mila		(substituted on) 60'
MF	17	(Brazil) Gabriel Batista
MF	18	(Brazil) Gharib
MF	20	(Brazil) Luiz Felipe
MF	26	(Brazil) Cássio Gabriel		(substituted on) 60'
MF	41	(Brazil) João Borim	(yellow card) 74'	(substituted on) 60'
FW	9	(Brazil) Gonzalo		(substituted on) 75'
FW	21	(Brazil) Rodriguinho
FW	27	(Brazil) Gustavo Henrique		(substituted on) 75'
Coach:
(Brazil) Evaristo Piza

GK	42	(Brazil) Andrey (c)
DF	14	(Brazil) Matheus Castelo
DF	4	(Brazil) Darlan		(substituted off) 72'
DF	3	(Brazil) Matheus Mega
MF	33	(Brazil) Bruno Peres		(substituted off) 81'
MF	16	(Brazil) Ruan	(yellow card) 35'	(substituted off) 57'
MF	10	(Brazil) Gui Mendes		(substituted off) 72'
MF	17	(Brazil) Tenner	(yellow card) 37'	(substituted off) 57'
MF	6	(Brazil) Kaio Cristian
FW	25	(Brazil) David Lopes
FW	26	(Brazil) Breno Melo
Substitutes:
GK	12	(Brazil) Gabriel Bernard
DF	2	(Brazil) Thainler		(substituted on) 81'
DF	5	(Brazil) Carlos Ventura
DF	22	(Brazil) Murilo Henrique
MF	8	(Brazil) Natham		(substituted on) 57'
MF	88	(Brazil) Alex Galo	(yellow card) 76'	(substituted on) 57'
FW	9	(Brazil) Neto Oliveira		(substituted on) 72'
FW	19	(Brazil) Rafael		(substituted on) 72'
Coach:
(Brazil) Rodrigo César

Assistant referees:
Leandro dos Santos Ruberdo (Mato Grosso do Sul)
Marcelo Grando (Mato Grosso do Sul)
Fourth official:
Anderson Ribeiro Gonçalves (Goiás)
Fifth official:
Jordana Pereira Batista (Goiás)
Video assistant referee:
Philip Georg Bennett (Rio de Janeiro)
Assistant video assistant referee:
José Reinaldo Nascimento Júnior (Distrito Federal)
Rafael Martins Diniz (Distrito Federal)

=== Second leg ===
27 May 2026
20:00 BRT (UTC−3)

Rio Branco (Espírito Santo)	2–1	(Goiás) Anápolis
Victor Braga 17' (pen.); Murilo Henrique 45+4'	Report	Mila 90+6'

Estádio Kleber Andrade, Cariacica
Attendance: 3,378
Referee: Thaillan Azevedo Gomes (Amapá)

Rio Branco	Anápolis

GK	42	(Brazil) Andrey (c)
DF	33	(Brazil) Bruno Peres		(substituted off) 30'
DF	14	(Brazil) Matheus Castelo	(yellow card) 88'
DF	5	(Brazil) Rafael Vaz
DF	6	(Brazil) Kaio Cristian
MF	22	(Brazil) Murilo Henrique	(yellow card) 52'	(red card) 90+7'	(substituted off) 90+1'
MF	8	(Brazil) Natham		(substituted off) 68'
MF	16	(Brazil) Ruan	(red card) 73'
MF	26	(Brazil) Breno Melo
FW	7	(Brazil) Rodrigo Carioca	(red card) 90+7'
FW	20	(Brazil) Victor Braga	(red card) 90+7'	(substituted off) 90+1'
Substitutes:
GK	1	(Brazil) Fernando Henrique	(red card) 90+7'
GK	12	(Brazil) Gabriel Bernard
DF	2	(Brazil) Thainler		(substituted on) 30'
DF	3	(Brazil) Matheus Mega
DF	13	(Brazil) Carlos Ventura		(substituted on) 90+1'
DF	23	(Brazil) Iverson
MF	15	(Brazil) Daniel Bôaz
MF	17	(Brazil) Tenner
MF	18	(Brazil) Edmílson
FW	19	(Brazil) Rafael		(substituted on) 68'
FW	25	(Brazil) David Lopes		(substituted on) 90+1'
Coach:
(Brazil) Rodrigo César

GK	12	(Brazil) Ravel
DF	2	(Brazil) Rubinho
DF	14	(Brazil) Igor Souza
DF	5	(Brazil) Rafael Costa
DF	6	(Brazil) Leonan
MF	13	(Brazil) Kauan Martins	(yellow card) 18'	(substituted off) 46'
MF	15	(Brazil) Kauan Guilherme	(yellow card) 34'	(substituted off) 46'
MF	10	(Brazil) Juninho		(substituted off) 57'
FW	7	(Brazil) Matheus Lagoa (c)		(substituted off) 69'
FW	11	(Brazil) Fernandinho		(substituted off) 46'
FW	19	(Brazil) Fernando Viana
Substitutes:
GK	23	(Brazil) Victor Hugo	(yellow card) 63'
DF	3	(Brazil) Hélder
DF	16	(Brazil) Júlio Gouvêa
MF	5	(Brazil) Mila		(substituted on) 46'
MF	8	(Brazil) Vitor Fonseca	(red card) 56'	(substituted on) 46'
MF	20	(Brazil) Luiz Felipe
MF	26	(Brazil) Cássio Gabriel		(substituted on) 46'
MF	41	(Brazil) João Borim		(substituted on) 57'
FW	9	(Brazil) Gonzalo		(substituted on) 69'
FW	21	(Brazil) Rodriguinho
FW	27	(Brazil) Gustavo Henrique
Coach:
(Brazil) Evaristo Piza

Assistant referees:
Luan Patrique Pereira da Silva (Amapá)
Inácio Barreto da Camara (Amapá)
Fourth official:
Wesley Silva dos Santos (Espírito Santo)
Fifth official:
Vagner Nascimento (Espírito Santo)
Video assistant referee:
José Cláudio Rocha Filho (São Paulo)
Assistant video assistant referee:
Ciro Chaban Junqueira (Distrito Federal)
Thiago do Carmo Brasil (Rondônia)

== See also ==
- 2026 Copa do Nordeste
- 2026 Copa Sul-Sudeste
- 2026 Copa Norte
- 2026 Copa Verde
