= 2026 Copa Verde =

13th edition of a Brazilian association football competition

Anápolis	Paysandu
(Goiás)	(Pará)
3	5
- on aggregate

First leg
Anápolis	Paysandu
3	1
- Date: 4 June 2026
- Venue: Estádio Jonas Duarte, Anápolis
- Referee: Leonardo Willers Lorenzatto
- Attendance: 3,888

Second leg
Paysandu	Anápolis
4	0
- Date: 7 June 2026
- Venue: Mangueirão, Belém
- Referee: Alisson Sidnei Furtado
- Attendance: 31,022

The 2026 Copa Verde was the 13th edition and the 1st as a supercup format of this football competition held in Brazil, and contested by the reigning champions of the Copa Centro-Oeste and the Copa Norte. It was contested by Anápolis, winners of the 2026 Copa Centro-Oeste, and Paysandu, winners of the 2026 Copa Norte.

Paysandu defeated Anápolis 5–3 on aggregate to win their 6th title.

== Teams ==
In the following table, the finals until 2025 were in the tournament era and since 2026 were in the supercup era.

Team	Qualification	Previous participations (bold indicates winners)
(Goiás) Anápolis	Winners of the 2026 Copa Centro-Oeste	None
(Pará) Paysandu	Winners of the 2026 Copa Norte	9 (2014, **2016**, 2017, **2018**, 2019, **2022**, 2023, **2024**, **2025**)

== Format ==
The finals were played on a home-and-away two-legged basis. If tied on aggregate, the penalty shoot-out was used to determine the winner.

== Matches ==
=== First leg ===
4 June 2026
20:00 BRT (UTC−3)

Anápolis (Goiás)	3–1	(Pará) Paysandu
Juninho 16'; Matheus Lagoa 45+3'; Leonan 74'	Report	Juninho 90+2'

Estádio Jonas Duarte, Anápolis
Attendance: 3,888
Referee: Leonardo Willers Lorenzatto (Mato Grosso)

**Anápolis**	**Paysandu**

GK	31	(Brazil) Ravel
DF	2	(Brazil) Rubinho	(yellow card) 37'
DF	3	(Brazil) Hélder	(yellow card) 17' (yellow-red card) 55'
DF	4	(Brazil) Rafael Costa
DF	6	(Brazil) Leonan	(yellow card) 74'
MF	5	(Brazil) Mila		(substituted off) 76'
MF	13	(Brazil) Kauan Martins
MF	26	(Brazil) Cássio Gabriel		(substituted off) 49'
MF	10	(Brazil) Juninho		(substituted off) 65'
FW	7	(Brazil) Matheus Lagoa (c)		(substituted off) 76'
FW	19	(Brazil) Fernando Viana	(yellow card) 52'	(substituted off) 65'
Substitutes:
GK	23	(Brazil) Victor Hugo
DF	14	(Brazil) Igor Souza
DF	33	(Brazil) Robson Reis
DF	16	(Brazil) Júlio Gouvêa
MF	8	(Brazil) Giva		(substituted on) 76'
MF	15	(Brazil) Kauan Guilherme
MF	20	(Brazil) Luiz Felipe		(substituted on) 49'
MF	41	(Brazil) João Borim		(substituted on) 76'
FW	9	(Brazil) Gonzalo		(substituted on) 65'
FW	11	(Brazil) Fernandinho		(substituted on) 65'
FW	21	(Brazil) Rodriguinho
FW	27	(Brazil) Gustavo Henrique
Coach:
(Brazil) Evaristo Piza

GK	12	(Brazil) Gabriel Mesquita
DF	2	(Brazil) Edílson		(substituted off) 81'
DF	15	(Brazil) Castro
DF	3	(Uruguay) Yeferson Quintana
DF	31	(Uruguay) Facundo Bonifazi	(yellow card) 38'	(substituted off) 65'
MF	39	(Brazil) Pedro Henrique
MF	8	(Brazil) Caio Mello		(substituted off) 72'
MF	10	(Brazil) Marcinho (c)
FW	19	(Brazil) Thayllon		(substituted off) 65'
FW	75	(Brazil) Kleiton Pego		(substituted off) 72'
FW	9	(Brazil) Ítalo
Substitutes:
GK	41	(Brazil) Marcão
DF	4	(Brazil) Iarley
DF	6	(Brazil) Luccão
DF	14	(Brazil) Bruno Bispo
DF	26	(Brazil) Cauã Libonati
DF	77	(Brazil) Luciano Taboca		(substituted on) 65'
MF	5	(Brazil) Henrico		(substituted on) 72'
MF	20	(Brazil) Matheus Capixaba
MF	23	(Brazil) Brian
MF	99	(Brazil) Lucas Cardoso		(substituted on) 72'
FW	30	(Brazil) Thalyson		(substituted on) 81'
FW	98	(Brazil) Juninho		(substituted on) 65'
Coach:
(Brazil) Júnior Rocha

Assistant referees:
Alex Sandro Quadros Thomé (Roraima)
Joverton Wesley de Souza Lima (Rondônia)
Fourth official:
Angleison Marcos Vieira Monteiro (Rondônia)
Fifth official:
Jonny Kamenach Rocha (Goiás)
Video assistant referee:
Emerson de Almeida Ferreira (Minas Gerais)
Assistant video assistant referee:
José Reinaldo Nascimento Júnior (Distrito Federal)
Rodrigo Batista Raposo (Distrito Federal)

=== First leg ===
7 June 2026
18:30 BRT (UTC−3)

Paysandu (Pará)	4–0	(Goiás) Anápolis
Kleiton Pego 41'; Castro 52'; Ítalo 90+1', 90+4'	Report

Mangueirão, Belém
Attendance: 31,022
Referee: Alisson Sidnei Furtado (Tocantins)

**Paysandu**	**Anápolis**

GK	12	(Brazil) Gabriel Mesquita
DF	2	(Brazil) Edílson
DF	15	(Brazil) Castro
DF	3	(Uruguay) Yeferson Quintana		(substituted off) 25'
DF	31	(Uruguay) Facundo Bonifazi		(substituted off) 82'
MF	39	(Brazil) Pedro Henrique	(yellow card) 55'	(substituted off) 72'
MF	8	(Brazil) Caio Mello
MF	10	(Brazil) Marcinho (c)	(yellow card) 90+2'
FW	19	(Brazil) Thayllon	(yellow card) 30'	(substituted off) 72'
FW	75	(Brazil) Kleiton Pego
FW	98	(Brazil) Juninho		(substituted off) 72'
Substitutes:
GK	1	(Brazil) Jean Drosny
DF	4	(Brazil) Iarley
DF	6	(Brazil) Luccão
DF	14	(Brazil) Bruno Bispo		(substituted on) 25'
DF	77	(Brazil) Luciano Taboca
MF	5	(Brazil) Henrico
MF	20	(Brazil) Matheus Capixaba
MF	23	(Brazil) Brian		(substituted on) 72'
MF	25	(Brazil) Tiago Índio
MF	99	(Brazil) Lucas Cardoso	(yellow card) 90+3'	(substituted on) 82'
FW	9	(Brazil) Ítalo	(yellow card) 90+2'	(substituted on) 72'
FW	30	(Brazil) Thalyson		(substituted on) 72'
Coach:
(Brazil) Júnior Rocha

GK	31	(Brazil) Ravel	(yellow card) 31'
DF	2	(Brazil) Rubinho	(yellow card) 35'	(substituted off) 46'
DF	3	(Brazil) Igor Souza
DF	4	(Brazil) Rafael Costa
DF	6	(Brazil) Leonan
MF	13	(Brazil) Kauan Martins
MF	5	(Brazil) Mila	(yellow card) 46'
MF	10	(Brazil) Juninho		(substituted off) 60'
FW	7	(Brazil) Matheus Lagoa (c)		(substituted off) 66'
FW	27	(Brazil) Gustavo Henrique	(yellow card) 45+2'	(substituted off) 46'
FW	19	(Brazil) Fernando Viana	(yellow card) 5'	(substituted off) 60'
Substitutes:
GK	23	(Brazil) Victor Hugo
DF	16	(Brazil) Júlio Gouvêa
MF	8	(Brazil) Giva
MF	15	(Brazil) Kauan Guilherme		(substituted on) 46'
MF	18	(Brazil) Kallyel
MF	20	(Brazil) Luiz Felipe
MF	26	(Brazil) Cássio Gabriel		(substituted on) 60'
MF	41	(Brazil) João Borim
FW	9	(Brazil) Gonzalo	(red card) 90+7'	(substituted on) 46'
FW	11	(Brazil) Fernandinho		(substituted on) 60'
FW	21	(Brazil) Rodriguinho		(substituted on) 66'
Coach:
(Brazil) Evaristo Piza

Assistant referees:
Cipriano da Silva Sousa (Tocantins)
Fábio Pereira (Tocantins)
Fourth official:
Daniel Alejandro Hidalgo Blanco (Roraima)
Fifth official:
Nayara Lucena Soares (Pará)
Video assistant referee:
Paulo Renato Moreira da Silva Coelho (Rio de Janeiro)
Assistant video assistant referee:
Diogo Carvalho Silva (Rio de Janeiro)
Thiago do Carmo Brasil (Roraima)

== See also ==
- 2026 Copa Centro-Oeste
- 2026 Copa do Nordeste
- 2026 Copa Norte
- 2026 Copa Sul-Sudeste
