= 2026 Copa Centro-Oeste =

5th edition of a Brazilian association football competition

Tournament details
- Country: Brazil
- Dates: 25 March – 27 May
- Teams: 12

Final positions
- Champions: (Goiás) Anápolis (1st title)
- Runners-up: (Espírito Santo) Rio Branco

Tournament statistics
- Matches played: 34
- Goals scored: 83 (2.44 per match)
- Top goal scorer(s): (Brazil) Alex Choco (4 goals)

The 2026 Copa Centro-Oeste was the 5th edition of this football competition held in Brazil. The 2026 edition marked the return of the competition, which has not been held since 2002. Featuring 12 clubs, Distrito Federal, Espírito Santo, Goiás, Mato Grosso and Tocantins have two vacancies; Mato Grosso do Sul with one. The other one berth was set according to CBF ranking.

In the finals, Anápolis defeated Rio Branco 4–2 on aggregate to win their first title and a place in the third round of the 2027 Copa do Brasil and earned the right to play against 2026 Copa Norte winners Paysandu in the 2026 Copa Verde.

== Qualified teams ==
Association	Team	Qualification method
(Federal District (Brazil)) Distrito Federal; 2 berths	Gama	2025 Campeonato Brasiliense champions
(Federal District (Brazil)) Distrito Federal; 2 berths	Capital	2025 Campeonato Brasiliense runners-up
(Espírito Santo) Espírito Santo; 2 berths	Rio Branco	2025 Campeonato Capixaba champions
(Espírito Santo) Espírito Santo; 2 berths	Porto Vitória	2025 Copa ES runners-up
(Goiás) Goiás; 2+1 berths	Vila Nova	2025 Campeonato Goiano champions
(Goiás) Goiás; 2+1 berths	Anápolis	2025 Campeonato Goiano runners-up
(Goiás) Goiás; 2+1 berths	Atlético Goianiense	Best placed team in the 2026 CBF ranking not already qualified
(Mato Grosso) Mato Grosso; 2 berths	Primavera	2025 Campeonato Mato-Grossense champions
(Mato Grosso) Mato Grosso; 2 berths	Cuiabá	2025 Campeonato Mato-Grossense runners-up
(Mato Grosso do Sul) Mato Grosso do Sul; 1 berth	Operário	2025 Campeonato Sul-Mato-Grossense champions
(Tocantins) Tocantins; 2 berths	Araguaína	2025 Campeonato Tocantinense champions
(Tocantins) Tocantins; 2 berths	Tocantinópolis	2025 Campeonato Tocantinense runners-up

== Schedule ==
The schedule of the competition is as follows.

Phase	Round	First leg	Second leg
Group stage	Matchday 1	24, 25 and 26 March 2026	
Group stage	Matchday 2	28 and 29 March 2026	
Group stage	Matchday 3	7, 8 and 9 April 2026	
Group stage	Matchday 4	15 and 16 April 2026	
Group stage	Matchday 5	29 April 2026	
Knockout stage	Semi-finals	6 and 13 May 2026	
Knockout stage	Finals	21 May 2026	27 May 2026

== Group stage ==
=== Group A ===
Pos	Team	Pld	W	D	L	GF	GA	GD	Pts	Qualification
1	(Goiás) Vila Nova (A)	5	2	2	1	10	4	+6	8	Advance to Knockout stage
2	(Espírito Santo) Rio Branco (A)	5	2	2	1	5	4	+1	8	Advance to Knockout stage
3	(Mato Grosso do Sul) Operário	5	2	2	1	8	10	−2	8	
4	(Tocantins) Araguaína	5	2	1	2	6	4	+2	7	
5	(Federal District (Brazil)) Capital	5	1	3	1	6	7	−1	6	
6	(Mato Grosso) Primavera	5	0	2	3	6	12	−6	2	

Updated to match(es) played on 29 April 2026. Source: CBF
Rules for classification: 1) points; 2) wins; 3) goal difference; 4) goals scored; 5) fewest red cards; 6) fewest yellow cards; 7) drawing of lots.
(A) Advance to a further round

=== Group B ===
Pos	Team	Pld	W	D	L	GF	GA	GD	Pts	Qualification
1	(Federal District (Brazil)) Gama (A)	5	5	0	0	8	3	+5	15	Advance to Knockout stage
2	(Goiás) Anápolis (A)	5	3	0	2	9	3	+6	9	Advance to Knockout stage
3	(Goiás) Atlético Goianiense	5	2	1	2	5	5	0	7	
4	(Espírito Santo) Porto Vitória	5	2	1	2	7	8	−1	7	
5	(Tocantins) Tocantinópolis	5	0	3	2	2	5	−3	3	
6	(Mato Grosso) Cuiabá	5	0	1	4	2	9	−7	1	

Updated to match(es) played on 29 April 2026. Source: CBF
Rules for classification: 1) points; 2) wins; 3) goal difference; 4) goals scored; 5) fewest red cards; 6) fewest yellow cards; 7) drawing of lots.
(A) Advance to a further round

== Knockout stage ==
=== Bracket ===
Semi-finals
(Goiás) Vila Nova	1 (3)
(Goiás) Anápolis (p)	1 (4)
(Federal District (Brazil)) Gama	0
(Espírito Santo) Rio Branco	1

Finals
(Goiás) Anápolis	3	1	4
(Espírito Santo) Rio Branco	0	2	2

== Finals ==
21 May 2026
20:00 BRT (UTC−3)

Anápolis (Goiás)	3–0	(Espírito Santo) Rio Branco
Fernandinho 59'; Juninho 86'; Igor Souza 90+4'	Report

Estádio Jonas Duarte, Anápolis
Attendance: 2,823
Referee: Paulo Henrique Schleich Vollkopf

27 May 2026
20:00 BRT (UTC−3)

Rio Branco (Espírito Santo)	2–1	(Goiás) Anápolis
Victor Braga 17' (pen.); Murilo Henrique 45+4'	Report	Mila 90+6'

Estádio Kleber Andrade, Cariacica
Attendance: 3,378
Referee: Thaillan Azevedo Gomes

Anápolis won 4–2 on aggregate.
