= Yeferson Quintana =

Uruguayan footballer (born 1996)

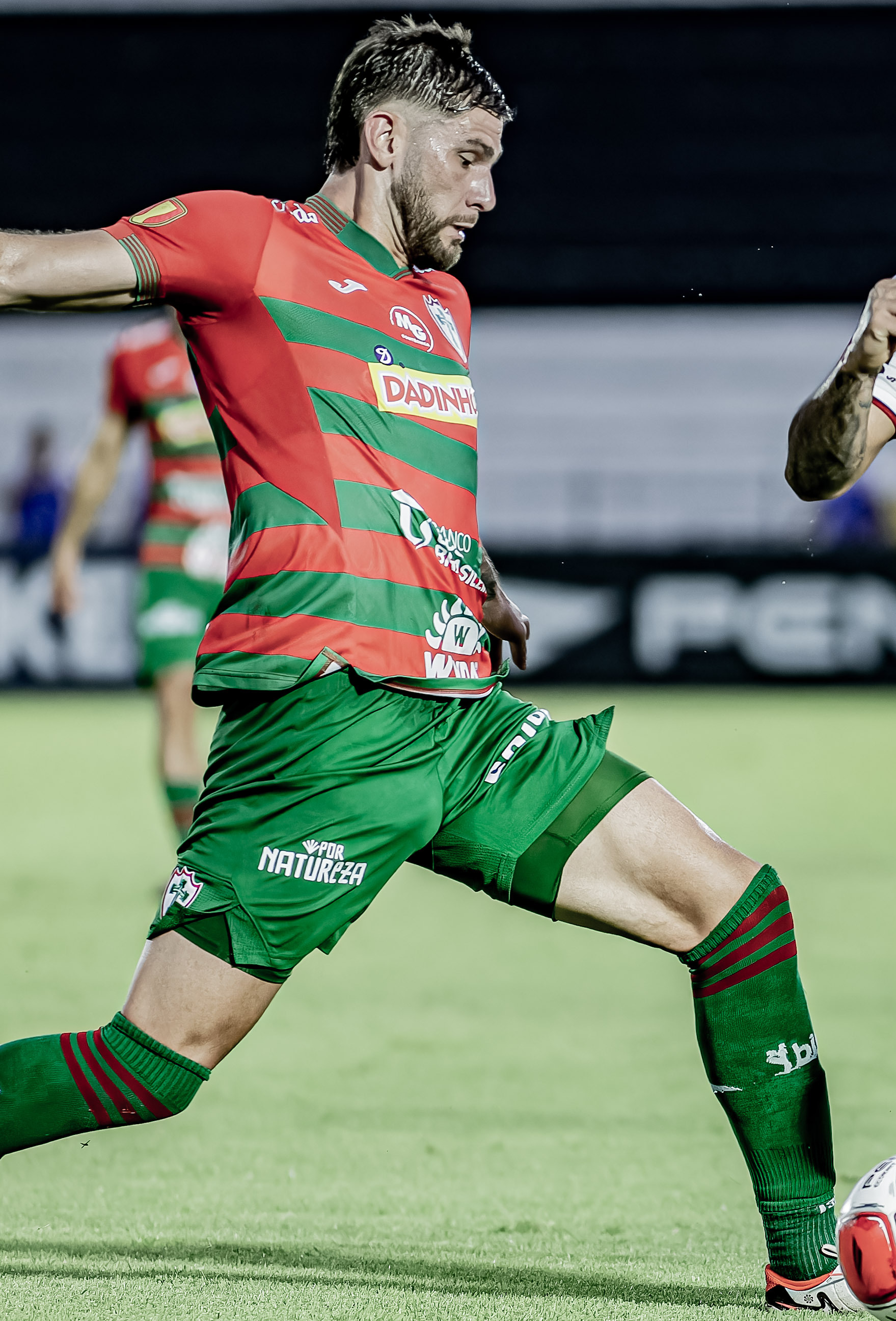
- Quintana with Portuguesa in 2024

Personal information
- Full name: Yeferson Agustín Quintana Alonso
- Date of birth: 19 April 1996 (age 30)
- Place of birth: Bella Unión, Uruguay
- Height: 1.93 m (6 ft 4 in)
- Position: Centre-back

Team information
- Current team: Paysandu
- Number: 3

Youth career
- Atlético Cañero
- 2011–2013: Deportivo Tropezón
- 2013–2016: Peñarol

Senior career*
Years	Team	Apps	(Gls)
2016–2022	Peñarol	26	(3)
2018	→ San Jose Earthquakes (loan)	13	(1)
2019	→ Cerro Largo (loan)	26	(1)
2020	→ Danubio (loan)	6	(0)
2020–2022	→ Racing Ferrol (loan)	36	(4)
2022–2023	Defensor Sporting	25	(0)
2024	Portuguesa	12	(0)
2024–	Paysandu	45	(4)
- * Club domestic league appearances and goals as of 19 December 2025 (UTC)

Yeferson Agustín Quintana Alonso (born 19 April 1996) is a Uruguayan professional footballer who plays as a centre-back for Brazilian club Paysandu.

== Career ==
=== Early career ===
Born in Bella Unión, Quintana began his career with Atlético Cañero, before representing hometown side Deportivo Tropezón Tablero. In 2014, he joined the youth academy of Primera División team Peñarol.

=== Peñarol ===
In September 2015, Quintana was promoted to the first team after Gonzalo Viera left the club. In June 2016, Quintana signed his first professional contract with Peñarol.

Quintana appeared for Peñarol's first team for the first time on 16 August 2016, on the bench in their Copa Sudamericana match against Sportivo Luqueño. He made his competitive debut for the club on 3 September, coming on as a 52nd-minute substitute for Bressan in a 2–0 Primera División home win over Fénix.

During the 2017 season, Quintana played 22 matches for Peñarol as he helped lead the club to a league title. He scored his first goal for the club on 10 June 2017 in a 4–1 victory over Rampla Juniors. The following week on 18 June, Quintana scored the winning goal for Peñarol in a 2–1 victory over El Tanque Sisley.

==== Loan spells ====
On 17 January 2018, MLS side the San Jose Earthquakes announced that they had signed Quintana to a one-year loan, with an option to buy. He stated after his arrival in San Jose that he hoped the team would decide to keep him at the season's end.

Quintana made his MLS debut on 3 March 2018, in San Jose's season-opening 3-2 victory over Minnesota United. However, he was substituted in the 54th minute after suffering an injury. He scored his first MLS goal against New York City in a 2–1 loss on 31 March.

On 14 February 2019, Quintana was loaned out again, this time to Cerro Largo for the rest of the year. He made 26 appearances for the team and scored one goal. Returning to Peñarol in the beginning of 2020, he was loaned out for the third time, to Danubio.

On 29 September 2020, Quintana moved to Spanish Segunda División B club Racing de Ferrol on loan until 30 June 2021. His loan was later renewed for the 2021–22 season, with the club in the newly-created Primera División RFEF.

=== Defensor Sporting ===
On 17 July 2022, Quintana returned to his home country after being announced at Defensor Sporting. Rarely used in his first season, he featured more regularly in the 2023 campaign.

=== Portuguesa ===
On 21 December 2023, Quintana was announced at Portuguesa for the 2024 season.

== Honours ==
Paysandu

- Supercopa Grão-Pará: 2025
- Copa Verde: 2025, 2026
- Campeonato Paraense: 2026
- Copa Norte: 2026

== Career statistics ==
As of 18 March 2024

Club	Season	League			National Cup		Continental		Other		Total	
Club	Season	Division	Apps	Goals	Apps	Goals	Apps	Goals	Apps	Goals	Apps	Goals
Peñarol	2016	Primera División	4	0	—		0	0	—		4	0
Peñarol	2017	Primera División	22	3	—		3 (Note: Appearance(s) in Copa Libertadores)	0	—		25	3
Peñarol	2019	Primera División	0	0	—		—		0	0	0	0
Peñarol	Total		26	3	—		3	0	0	0	29	3
San Jose Earthquakes (loan)	2018	MLS	13	1	0	0	—		—		13	1
Cerro Largo (loan)	2019	Primera División	26	1	—		—		—		26	1
Danubio (loan)	2020	Primera División	6	0	—		—		—		6	0
Racing Ferrol (loan)	2020–21	Segunda División B	16	3	—		—		—		16	3
Racing Ferrol (loan)	2021–22	Primera División RFEF	20	1	1	0	—		—		21	1
Racing Ferrol (loan)	Total		36	4	1	0	—		—		37	4
Defensor Sporting	2022	Primera División	6	0	—		—		—		6	0
Defensor Sporting	2023	Primera División	17	0	0	0	0	0	—		17	0
Defensor Sporting	Total		23	0	0	0	0	0	—		23	0
Portuguesa	2024	Paulista	—		—		—		12 (Note: Appearance(s) in Campeonato Paulista)	0	12	0
Career total			130	9	1	0	3	0	12	0	146	9
