= Lucas Cardoso (footballer, born 2000) =

Brazilian footballer

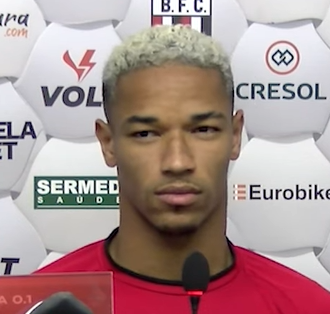
- Lucas Cardoso in 2023

Personal information
- Full name: Lucas Cardoso Moreira
- Date of birth: 3 August 2000 (age 26)
- Place of birth: Poxoréu, Brazil
- Height: 1.89 m (6 ft 2 in)
- Position: Attacking midfielder

Team information
- Current team: Paysandu
- Number: 99

Youth career
- União Rondonópolis

Senior career*
Years	Team	Apps	(Gls)
2020	União Rondonópolis	1	(0)
2020–2021	CEOV	22	(9)
2021–2026	Cuiabá	35	(2)
2022	→ Santo André (loan)	7	(0)
2023–2024	→ Botafogo-SP (loan)	31	(0)
2024	→ Riga (loan)	8	(0)
2024	→ Novorizontino (loan)	11	(0)
2025	→ Náutico (loan)	8	(1)
2026–	Paysandu	22	(1)
- * Club domestic league appearances and goals as of 9 November 2026

Lucas Cardoso Moreira (born 3 August 2000), known as Lucas Cardoso, is a Brazilian footballer who plays as an attacking midfielder for Paysandu.

== Club career ==
Born in Poxoréu, Mato Grosso, Lucas Cardoso made his senior debut with local side União Rondonópolis in the 2020 Campeonato Mato-Grossense. On 17 August of that year, he was announced at Série D side CEOV.

In June 2021, after scoring eight goals and being the top goalscorer of the 2021 Mato-Grossense, Lucas Cardoso signed for Cuiabá, and was initially assigned to the under-23 squad. On 14 December, he was loaned to Santo André for the 2022 Campeonato Paulista.

Upon returning, Lucas Cardoso was initially assigned to the under-23 team, but made his Série A debut on 23 October 2022, replacing Gabriel Pirani in a 2–1 home loss against Goiás.

== Career statistics ==
As of 4 May 2023

Club	Season	League			State League		Cup		Continental		Other		Total	
Club	Season	Division	Apps	Goals	Apps	Goals	Apps	Goals	Apps	Goals	Apps	Goals	Apps	Goals
União Rondonópolis	2020	Mato-Grossense	—		1	0	0	0	—		—		1	0
CEOV	2020	Série D	8	1	—		—		—		—		8	1
CEOV	2021	Mato-Grossense	—		14	8	—		—		—		14	8
CEOV	Total		8	1	14	8	—		—		—		22	9
Cuiabá	2021	Série A	0	0	—		—		—		9 (Note: Eight appearances and one goal in Copa FMF, one appearance in Copa Verde)	1	9	1
Cuiabá	2022	Série A	4	0	—		—		2 (Note: Appearance(s) in Copa Sudamericana)	0	—		6	0
Cuiabá	2023	Série A	0	0	10	1	1	0	—		2 (Note: Appearance(s) in Copa Verde)	0	13	1
Cuiabá	Total		4	0	10	1	1	0	2	0	11	1	28	2
Santo André (loan)	2022	Série D	0	0	7	0	—		—		—		7	0
Botafogo-SP (loan)	2022	Série B	1	0	—		—		—		—		1	0
Career total			13	1	32	9	1	0	2	0	11	1	59	11

== Honours ==
Cuiabá

- Campeonato Mato-Grossense: 2023
- Campeonato Brasileiro de Aspirantes: 2022

Paysandu

- Copa Norte: 2026
- Copa Verde: 2026
