= Matheus Vargas =

Brazilian footballer

Personal information
- Full name: Matheus de Vargas
- Date of birth: 18 June 1996 (age 30)
- Place of birth: Cláudia, Brazil
- Height: 1.81 m (5 ft 11 in)
- Position: Central midfielder

Team information
- Current team: Paysandu
- Number: 96

Youth career
- 2009: Rio Preto
- 2010: União Barbarense
- 2011–2012: Santo André
- 2013–2016: Audax
- 2014–2016: → Corinthians (loan)

Senior career*
Years	Team	Apps	(Gls)
2014–2019	Audax	11	(0)
2014	→ Audax Rio (loan)	7	(1)
2014–2016	→ Corinthians (loan)	0	(0)
2016	→ Oeste (loan)	26	(2)
2017–2018	→ Kerkyra (loan)	2	(0)
2018–2019	→ Ponte Preta (loan)	38	(6)
2019–2024	Fortaleza	33	(1)
2020–2021	→ Atlético Goianiense (loan)	40	(3)
2023	→ Sport Recife (loan)	14	(0)
2023–2024	→ Juventude (loan)	19	(2)
2024	Buriram United	8	(0)
2025–	Paysandu	27	(0)
- * Club domestic league appearances and goals as of 9 November 2026

Matheus de Vargas (born 18 June 1996) is a Brazilian footballer who plays as a central midfielder for Paysandu.

== Club career ==
Born in Cláudia, Mato Grosso, Vargas represented Rio Preto, União Barbarense, Santo André and Audax as a youth. Ahead of the 2014 campaign, he was loaned to partner team Audax Rio for the year's Campeonato Carioca.

Vargas made his senior debut on 20 February 2014, coming on as a half-time substitute for Guilherme in a 2–1 home win against Boavista, and scored his first goal six days later by netting the opener in a 5–3 home loss against Bonsucesso. After featuring regularly, he moved to Corinthians in September, returning to the youth setup.

In 2016, after his loan with Timão expired, Vargas moved to Oeste also in a temporary deal, as the club reached a partnership with Audax. He returned to his parent club for the 2017 season, but was loaned to Super League Greece side Kerkyra in June of that year.

In September 2018, Vargas joined Ponte Preta on loan until the following April. His loan was later extended, but on 6 September of the following year, he agreed to a permanent two-year deal with Fortaleza.

Vargas made his Série A debut on 15 September 2019, replacing Osvaldo in a 1–1 away draw against Bahia. On 30 December, after only two top tier appearances, he was loaned to fellow league team Atlético Goianiense for the 2020 campaign.

== Honours ==
Corinthians

- Copa São Paulo de Futebol Júnior: 2015

Atlético Goianiense

- Campeonato Goiano: 2020

Fortaleza

- Campeonato Cearense: 2021, 2022
- Copa do Nordeste: 2022

Sport Recife

- Campeonato Pernambucano: 2023

Paysandu

- Supercopa Grão-Pará: 2025
- Copa Verde: 2025, 2026
- Campeonato Paraense: 2026
- Copa Norte: 2026
