= Ítalo (footballer, born 1996) =

Brazilian footballer

Personal information
- Full name: Ítalo de Carvalho Rocha Lima
- Date of birth: 7 November 1996 (age 30)
- Place of birth: São Paulo, Brazil
- Height: 1.83 m (6 ft 0 in)
- Position: Forward

Team information
- Current team: Paysandu

Youth career
- –2016: Villa Nova

Senior career*
Years	Team	Apps	(Gls)
2016	Villa Nova	6	(1)
2017	Batatais	15	(4)
2017	Tupi	14	(5)
2018	Atlético Tubarão	4	(0)
2019	XV de Piracicaba	13	(5)
2019	Ponte Preta	0	(0)
2019–2020	APOEL	0	(0)
2020	→ Doxa (loan)	7	(1)
2020–2022	Azuriz	4	(0)
2021	→ Ponte Preta (loan)		
2021	→ Luverdense (loan)		
2022	→ Amazonas (loan)	17	(11)
2023	América de Natal	14	(6)
2023–2024	Volta Redonda	46	(21)
2024	→ Daegu (loan)	9	(2)
2025	Seoul E-Land FC	5	(1)
2025–	Volta Redonda	18	(2)
2026–	→ Paysandu (loan)	32	(15)
- * Club domestic league appearances and goals as of 19 December 2025

Ítalo de Carvalho Rocha Lima (born 7 November 1996), also known as Ítalo, is a Brazilian professional footballer who plays as a forward for Paysandu.

== Career ==
Revealed at Villa Nova, he played for several clubs until in 2023, at Amazonas FC, becoming one of the top scorers in Série D in the 2022 edition. In 2023, he went to América de Natal where he became state champion. In April, it was announced by Volta Redonda.

In July 2024, Ítalo was loaned to the K League 1 club Daegu FC. On 7 January 2025, Ítalo joined K League 2 club Seoul E-Land FC. In June, Ítalo returned to Volta Redonda to compete in the 2025 Campeonato Brasileiro Série B.

== Honours ==
América

- Campeonato Potiguar: 2023

Paysandu

- Copa Norte: 2026
- Copa Verde: 2026

Individual

- 2022 Campeonato Brasileiro Série D top scorer: 11 goals
