= Júnior Rocha =

Brazilian footballer (born 1981)

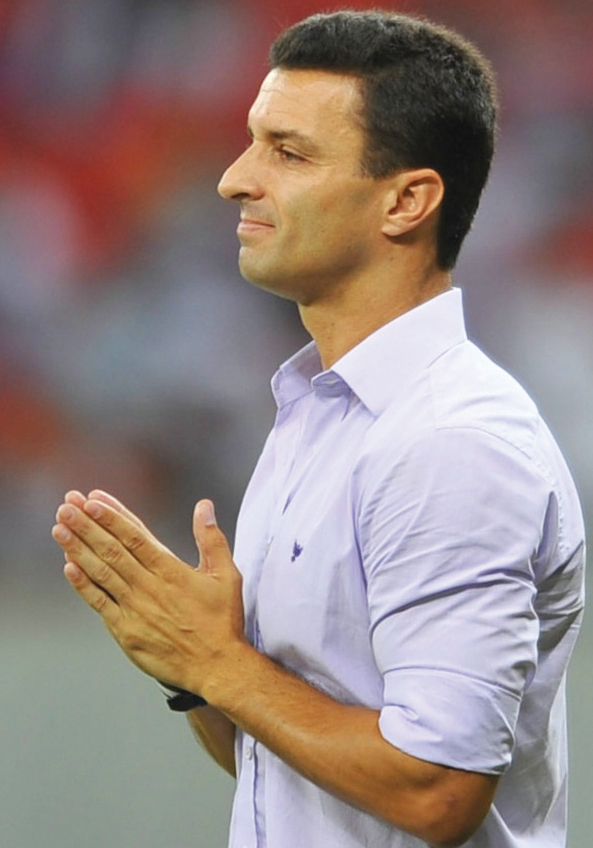
- Júnior Rocha in 2018

Personal information
- Full name: Dilceu Rocha Júnior
- Date of birth: 21 April 1981 (age 45)
- Place of birth: São Leopoldo, Brazil
- Height: 1.85 m (6 ft 1 in)
- Position: Forward

Youth career
- Aimoré

Senior career*
Years	Team	Apps	(Gls)
2001–2004	RS Futebol		
2005	15 de Novembro	2	(0)
2005–2006	Ulbra		
2006	Novo Hamburgo		
2007	15 de Novembro	4	(0)
2007	Ulbra		
2008–2011	Luverdense		(11)
2009	→ Sinop (loan)		
2011	→ Coruripe (loan)		

Managerial career
- 2011: Chimarrão (youth)
- 2011: Aimoré (youth)
- 2012: Novo Hamburgo (youth)
- 2013: Luverdense U20
- 2013: Luverdense (assistant)
- 2013–2014: Luverdense
- 2015–2016: Luverdense
- 2017: Novorizontino
- 2017: Luverdense
- 2018: Santa Cruz
- 2018: CRB
- 2019: Luverdense
- 2020: Votuporanguense
- 2020: Barra-SC
- 2021: Ypiranga
- 2022: Figueirense
- 2023–2024: Inter de Limeira
- 2024: Guarani
- 2024–2025: Ferroviária
- 2025: Caxias
- 2026: Paysandu
- * Club domestic league appearances and goals

Dilceu Rocha Júnior (born 21 April 1981), known as Júnior Rocha, is a Brazilian football coach and former player who played as a forward.

== Playing career ==
Born in São Leopoldo, Rio Grande do Sul, Júnior Rocha played for Aimoré as a youth before making his senior debut with RS Futebol, and played with Thiago Silva at the latter. In the 2005 season, he was a part of the 15 de Novembro which reached the 2005 Campeonato Gaúcho finals, but was rarely used.

Júnior Rocha subsequently moved to Ulbra before returning to 15 de Novembro in 2007, but was announced at Luverdense in November of that year. In 2009, he helped the latter to win the year's Campeonato Mato-Grossense, being the competition's top scorer with eight goals; later in that year, he also played in the Copa FMF with Sinop.

Júnior Rocha began the 2011 campaign with Coruripe, but subsequently returned to LEC for the remainder of the year. After being released prior to the 2011 Série C, he retired at the age of 30.

== Coaching career ==
Shortly after retiring, Júnior Rocha began his coaching career after being named coach of Chimarrão FC, a popular youth club in his native state. He subsequently worked in the youth sides of Aimoré and Novo Hamburgo before returning to Luverdense on 14 January 2013, as head coach of the under-19 team.

In April 2013, Júnior Rocha became an assistant of Luverdense's main squad, before being appointed interim head coach on 29 June 2013, after the departure of Roberval Davino. Permanently named head coach in July, and led the club to a promotion to the Série B.

On 13 October 2014, Júnior Rocha was dismissed from LEC after a 3–0 loss to Paraná. The following 23 February, however, he returned to the club, replacing sacked Leandro Niehues, and led them to the Mato-Grossense title.

On 14 November 2016, Júnior Rocha was announced as head coach of Novorizontino for the upcoming season. Dismissed on 5 March of the following year, after just seven matches, he returned to Luverdense twelve days later, and won the 2017 Copa Verde with the side.

Júnior Rocha left Luverdense by mutual consent on 21 November 2017, after the club's relegation to the third division was confirmed. On 7 December, he took over Santa Cruz for the ensuing campaign.

On 15 April 2018, Júnior Rocha left Santa after receiving an offer from another club, and was announced at the helm of CRB. He was relieved from his duties at the latter on 27 June, after just 15 matches.

On 2 November 2018, Júnior Rocha returned to Luverdense for his fourth spell as head coach. He was sacked on 16 August, after the club's relegation to the Série D.

On 3 February 2020, Júnior Rocha was announced as head coach of Votuporanguense. He left the club amidst the COVID-19 pandemic, and was announced at Barra-SC on 11 September.

On 25 January 2021, Júnior Rocha was appointed head coach of Ypiranga-RS in the third division. After narrowly missing out promotion, he left on 19 November, and took over fellow league team Figueirense four days later.

Júnior Rocha left Figueira on 2 November 2022, as his contract was not renewed. The following 22 March, he replaced Pintado as Inter de Limeira head coach.

Júnior Rocha qualified Inter to the 2024 Campeonato Paulista quarterfinals, where they were knocked out by Red Bull Bragantino. On 2 May of that year, he left after accepting an offer from Guarani in the second level, but was dismissed from the latter after just 38 days.

On 20 July 2024, Júnior Rocha replaced Vinícius Bergantin as head coach of Ferroviária in the third division. He led the club to a promotion to the second tier after a 30-year absence, but was sacked the following 16 February after a poor start of the season.

On 22 April 2025, Júnior Rocha agreed to become the head coach of Caxias back in the third tier. Despite leading the first stage, his side missed out promotion in the second stage, and he left on 18 October.

On 24 November 2025, Júnior Rocha was announced at Paysandu for the upcoming season. The following 13 September, after two defeats in as many matches in the 2026 Série C second stage, he was sacked.

== Honours ==
=== Player ===
Luverdense

- Campeonato Mato-Grossense: 2009

=== Coach ===
Luverdense

- Campeonato Mato-Grossense: 2016
- Copa Verde: 2017

Figueirense

- Recopa Catarinense: 2022

Paysandu

- Campeonato Paraense: 2026
- Copa Norte: 2026
- Copa Verde: 2026
