= Facundo Bonifazi =

Uruguayan footballer (born 1995)

Personal information
- Full name: Facundo Bonifazi Castro
- Date of birth: 29 September 1995 (age 31)
- Place of birth: Montevideo, Uruguay
- Height: 1.74 m (5 ft 9 in)
- Position: Left-back

Team information
- Current team: Paysandu
- Number: 31

Youth career
- Malvín Alto
- 2010–2011: Progreso
- 2011–2014: El Tanque Sisley
- 2014–2016: Racing Club

Senior career*
Years	Team	Apps	(Gls)
2016–2019	Racing Club	65	(3)
2019–2020	MVV Maastricht	9	(1)
2020–2021	River Plate	47	(2)
2022	Peñarol	10	(0)
2023	Defensor Sporting	5	(0)
2024	Colón	28	(0)
2025	Cerro Largo	34	(1)
2026–	Paysandu	21	(0)
- * Club domestic league appearances and goals as of 9 November 2026

Facundo Bonifazi Castro (born 29 September 1995) is a Uruguayan footballer who plays as a defender for Paysandu.

== Career ==
On 8 August 2019, Bonifazi joined Dutch Eerste Divisie club MVV Maastricht on a two-year contract.

== Honours ==
Paysandu

- Campeonato Paraense:2026
- Copa Norte: 2026
- Copa Verde: 2026
