= Gabriel Mesquita =

Brazilian footballer (born 1998)

Personal information
- Full name: Gabriel José Ferreira Mesquita
- Date of birth: 14 September 1998 (age 28)
- Place of birth: Maceió, Brazil
- Height: 1.97 m (6 ft 6 in)
- Position: Goalkeeper

Team information
- Current team: Paysandu
- Number: 12

Youth career
- Athletico Paranaense

Senior career*
Years	Team	Apps	(Gls)
2018–2020	Athletico Paranaense	4	(0)
2020	→ Guarani (loan)	23	(0)
2021	Guarani	24	(0)
2022–2023	Cruzeiro	1	(0)
2023–	→ Água Santa (loan)	4	(0)
2024	Operário Ferroviário	8	(0)
2022	Guarani	12	(0)
2025–	Paysandu	47	(0)
- * Club domestic league appearances and goals as of 9 November 2026

Gabriel José Ferreira Mesquita (born 24 September 1998), simply known as Gabriel Mesquita, is a Brazilian footballer who plays as a goalkeeper for Paysandu.

== Club career ==
Born in Maceió, Alagoas, Gabriel made his senior debut with Athletico Paranaense on 31 March 2019, starting in a 4–1 away loss against Londrina for the year's Campeonato Paranaense.

== Honours ==
Paysandu

- Campeonato Paraense: 2026
- Copa Norte: 2026
- Copa Verde: 2026
