= Castro (Brazilian footballer) =

Brazilian footballer (born 1995)

Personal information
- Full name: Luiz Felipe Castro Neto
- Date of birth: 13 February 1995 (age 31)
- Place of birth: Rio de Janeiro, Brazil
- Height: 1.91 m (6 ft 3 in)
- Position: Centre-back

Team information
- Current team: Paysandu
- Number: 15

Youth career
- 2011–2013: São Cristóvão

Senior career*
Years	Team	Apps	(Gls)
2014	Coríntians	1	(0)
2016	Olaria	3	(0)
2017	Amparo	12	(1)
2017	Icasa	0	(0)
2018	Ferroviário	0	(0)
2018–2019	Alcanenense		
2019	Cascavel CR	9	(0)
2020	Anapolina	1	(0)
2020	Caucaia	1	(0)
2021	Cascavel CR	9	(3)
2021	Caucaia	7	(1)
2021	Rio São Paulo	9	(2)
2022	UNIRB	5	(0)
2022	Garibaldi	8	(4)
2023	Águia de Marabá	20	(2)
2023–2025	Ponte Preta	48	(1)
2025	The Strongest	5	(0)
2025	Atlético Goianiense	4	(0)
2026–	Paysandu	22	(0)
- * Club domestic league appearances and goals as of 9 November 2026

Luiz Felipe Castro Neto (born 13 February 1995), commonly known as Castro, is a Brazilian footballer who plays as a centre-back for Paysandu.

== Career ==
Born in Rio de Janeiro, Castro represented hometown side São Cristóvão as a youth. He began his senior career with Coríntians, and subsequently represented Olaria, Amparo and Icasa, impressing in the 2017 Copa Fares Lopes with the latter.

On 9 March 2018, Castro was announced at Ferroviário, but left in April after just three matches. He had a short spell abroad with Portuguese side Alcanenense, before spending the 2019 season with Cascavel CR.

On 19 November 2019, Castro agreed to a deal with Capital, but was announced at Anapolina on 2 January 2020. On 7 February, after just one match, he moved to Caucaia.

Castro returned to Cascavel for the 2021 campaign, but was suspended by the Federação Paranaense de Futebol for six matches after his club provided false COVID-19 test results. He subsequently returned to Caucaia, but finished the year with Rio São Paulo.

Castro played the 2022 Campeonato Baiano with UNIRB, but moved to Garibaldi for the year's Copa FGF. In December of that year, he was named in the squad of Águia de Marabá for the upcoming season, and was a regular starter as the club won the 2023 Campeonato Paraense.

On 23 June 2023, Águia confirmed that Castro had agreed to a deal with Série B side Ponte Preta. He only became a starter in the latter stages of the year, but started the 2024 campaign as a first-choice.

On 31 January 2025, after losing his starting spot, Castro moved abroad for the first time in his career, signing for Bolivian Primera División side The Strongest.

== Career statistics ==
As of 29 May 2026.

Club	Season	League			State League		Cup		Continental		Other		Total	
Club	Season	Division	Apps	Goals	Apps	Goals	Apps	Goals	Apps	Goals	Apps	Goals	Apps	Goals
Coríntians	2014	Potiguar	—		1	0	—		—		—		1	0
Olaria	2016	Carioca Série B	—		3	0	—		—		—		3	0
Amparo	2017	Paulista 2ª Divisão	—		12	1	—		—		—		12	1
Icasa	2017	Cearense Série B	—		—		—		—		6 (Note: Appearance(s) in Copa Fares Lopes)	1	6	1
Ferroviário	2018	Série D	0	0	0	0	0	0	—		3 (Note: Appearance(s) in Copa do Nordeste)	0	3	0
Cascavel CR	2019	Paranaense	—		9	0	—		—		—		9	0
Anapolina	2020	Goiano	—		1	0	—		—		—		1	0
Caucaia	2020	Cearense	—		1	0	—		—		—		1	0
Cascavel CR	2021	Paranaense	—		9	3	—		—		—		9	3
Caucaia	2021	Série D	7	1	—		—		—		—		7	1
Rio São Paulo	2021	Carioca Série B1	—		9	2	—		—		—		9	2
UNIRB	2022	Baiano	—		5	0	—		—		—		5	0
Garibaldi	2022	Gaúcho Série B	—		—		—		—		8 (Note: Appearance(s) in Copa FGF)	4	8	4
Águia de Marabá	2023	Série D	7	0	13	2	4	0	—		—		24	2
Ponte Preta	2023	Série B	6	0	—		—		—		4 (Note: Appearance(s) in Copa Paulista)	1	10	1
Ponte Preta	2024	Série B	27	1	12	0	—		—		—		39	1
Ponte Preta	2025	Série C	0	0	3	0	0	0	—		—		3	0
Ponte Preta	Total		33	1	15	0	0	0	—		4	1	52	2
The Strongest	2025	Bolivian Primera División	5	0	—		—		2 (Note: Appearance(s) in Copa Libertadores)	0	—		7	0
Atlético Goianiense	2025	Série B	4	0	—		—		—		—		4	0
Paysandu	2026	Série C	6	0	10	0	4	1	—		4 (Note: Appearance(s) in Copa Norte)	2	24	3
Career total			62	2	85	8	11	1	2	0	25	8	185	19

== Honours ==
Águia de Marabá

- Campeonato Paraense: 2023

Paysandu

- Campeonato Paraense: 2026
- Copa Norte: 2026
- Copa Verde: 2026
