= Vanessa Grazziotin =

Brazilian politician (born 1961)

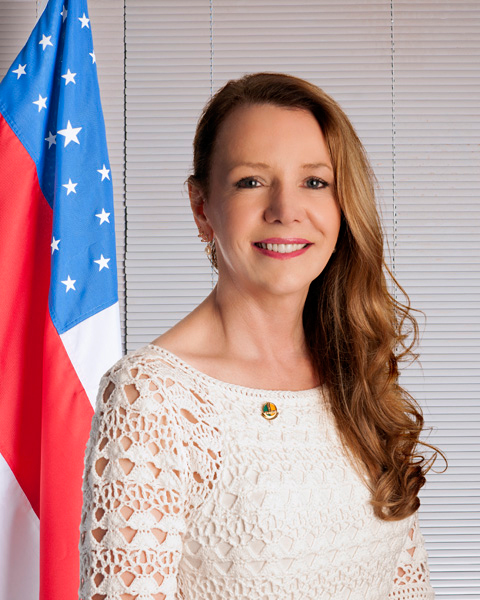

Senator from Amazonas
- In office February 1, 2011 – February 1, 2019

Federal Deputy from Amazonas
- In office February 1, 1999 – February 1, 2011

City Councilor of Manaus
- In office January 1, 1989 – February 1, 1999

Personal details
- Born: June 29, 1961 (age 65) Videira, SC, Brazil
- Party: PCdoB
- Spouse: Eronildo Braga Bezerra
- Children: Rafaela
- Education: Federal University of Amazonas
- Profession: Pharmacist

Vanessa Grazziotin (born June 29, 1961) is a Brazilian politician; a member of the Communist Party of Brazil (PC do B), she is a former Senator and currently the Director-General of the Amazon Cooperation Treaty Organization (ACTO). Although she was born in Videira, Santa Catarina, Grazziotin based her political career in the state of Amazonas. After serving three terms in the Chamber of Deputies, she was elected to the Federal Senate in the 2010 parliamentary election. She is the fourth Communist Party senator in Brazilian history after Luís Carlos Prestes, Inácio Arruda and Leomar Quintanilha. She is also Amazonas' first Communist Party senator. Vanessa served a single eight-year term as senator.

== Career ==
In 1985, Vanessa Grazziotin graduated in the Pharmacy College of the Federal University of Amazonas. She has been a member of the Communist Party of Brazil (PC do B) since 1980, when the party was still illegal. Through the PC do B, she was a councilwoman for Manaus for nine straight years, from 1989 to 1998, when she successfully ran for a seat in the Chamber of Deputies. She was re-elected twice, in 2002 and 2006. In 2004, she unsuccessfully ran for Mayor of Manaus, finishing the race in third place.

Among her proposals in the Chamber were the creation of a Green Seal for goods manufactured on the Manaus Free Trade Zone, the prohibition of the distribution of plastic bags, and the creation of the Day of African and Amerindian Culture (to be celebrated on May 13). The latter project was approved by the National Congress on March 30, 2010.

In 2010, Grazziotin ran for a seat in the Federal Senate. She was elected with 662,729 votes (22.8% of the total). Her election was rather impressive, once she defeated Arthur Virgílio, a prominent Senator from the Brazilian Social Democratic Party (PSDB). Virgílio accused Grazziotin of buying votes, the reason why he was called a "sore loser" by newsmagazine Istoé. Grazziotin claims she acted according to the Public Ministry guidelines. On May 2, 2016, the Regional Electoral State Attorney presented a motion to the Superior Electoral Court in order to abrogate her Senate mandate for crimes against the Election Law regulations (money abuse during campaign).

== Personal life ==
Grazziotin is married to fellow Communist politician Eron Bezerra, who acted as State Secretary for Rural Production in the Eduardo Braga administration and was recently elected to the Chamber of Deputies through PC do B. They have one daughter, named Rafaela.
