= Marcinho (footballer, born July 1995) =

Brazilian association football player (born 1995)

Personal information
- Full name: Márcio Barbosa Vieira Junior
- Date of birth: 28 July 1995 (age 31)
- Place of birth: Londrina, Brazil
- Height: 1.74 m (5 ft 9 in)
- Position: Midfielder

Team information
- Current team: Chapecoense
- Number: 95

Youth career
- 2014: Londrina

Senior career*
Years	Team	Apps	(Gls)
2015–2018	Londrina	49	(2)
2016	→ Operário-PR (loan)	9	(2)
2018	→ Oeste (loan)	27	(2)
2019	Brasil de Pelotas	6	(1)
2019	Manama Club	3	(2)
2020	Sampaio Corrêa	40	(9)
2021	Cruzeiro	32	(2)
2022	Novorizontino	10	(1)
2022	Guarani	10	(0)
2023	Criciúma	14	(0)
2023	→ Sampaio Corrêa (loan)	19	(1)
2023–2024	Al-Nasr Benghazi		
2024–2025	CSA	7	(0)
2025	Joinville	4	(2)
2025–2026	Chapecoense	22	(0)
2026–	Paysandu	33	(3)
- * Club domestic league appearances and goals as of 9 November 2026

Márcio Barbosa Vieira Junior (born 28 July 1995), commonly known as Marcinho, is a Brazilian professional footballer who plays as a midfielder for Paysandu.

== Career ==
Marcinho began his career at Londrina, representing the team in 2015 Campeonato Brasileiro Série C and 2016 Campeonato Brasileiro Série B. In 2018 he was loaned to Oeste for the 2018 Campeonato Brasileiro Série B season, and in 2019 he was loaned to Brasil de Pelotas in a loan-exchange deal with Hélder Maurílio.

In August 2019, though having bids from Portugal, Marcinho ended op joining Manama Club in Bahrain.

== Honours ==
Paysandu

- Campeonato Paraense: 2026
- Copa Norte: 2026
- Copa Verde: 2026
