= Leomar =

Leomar is a given name. Notable people with the name include:

- Leomar (footballer) (born 1987), Leomar Francisco Rodrigues, Brazilian football defender
- Leomar Antônio Brustolin (born 1967), Brazilian Archbishop
- Léomar Leiria (born 1971), Brazilian football defensive midfielder
- Leomar Najorda (born 1982), Filipino basketball player
- Leomar Pinto (born 1997), Venezuelan football winger
- Leomar Quintanilha (born 1945), Brazilian politician
