= Thayllon =

Brazilian footballer

Thayllon Lopes
Personal information
- Full name: Thayllon Lopes Medeiros
- Date of birth: 15 November 2001 (age 24)
- Place of birth: Porto Alegre, Brazil
- Height: 1.66 m (5 ft 5 in)
- Position: Winger

Team information
- Current team: Paysandu
- Number: 19

Youth career
- –2016: Tamoio
- 2017–2021: São José-RS
- 2020–2021: → Grêmio (loan)
- 2021: → Bahia (loan)

Senior career*
Years	Team	Apps	(Gls)
2018–2023	São José-RS	74	(10)
2021	→ Grêmio (loan)	1	(0)
2021	→ Bahia (loan)	2	(0)
2022	→ Passo Fundo (loan)	0	(0)
2024–	Atlético Goianiense	9	(0)
2024	→ Chapecoense (loan)	9	(0)
2024–2025	→ Ferroviária (loan)	29	(5)
2026–	→ Paysandu (loan)	25	(2)
- * Club domestic league appearances and goals as of 19 November 2026

Thayllon Lopes Medeiros (born 15 November 2001), known as Thayllon Lopes or simply Thayllon, is a Brazilian professional footballer who plays as a winger for Paysandu on loan from Atlético Goianiense.

== Club career ==
=== Grêmio ===
Born in Porto Alegre, Brazil, Thayllon joined the Grêmio's Academy at the age of 18 in 2020 on loan from São José-RS.

== Career statistics ==
=== Club ===
As of 6 January 2024.

Appearances and goals by club, season and competition
Club	Season	League			State league		National cup		Continental		Other		Total	
Club	Season	Division	Apps	Goals	Apps	Goals	Apps	Goals	Apps	Goals	Apps	Goals	Apps	Goals
São José-RS	2018	Série D	—		—		—		—		1 (Note: Appearance(s) in Copa FGF)	0	1	0
São José-RS	2019	Série C	—		—		—		—		8	4	8	4
São José-RS	2020	Série C	4	0	10	1	4	0	—		—		18	1
São José-RS	2022	Série C	16	0	8	0	—		—		—		24	0
São José-RS	2023	Série C	25	9	11	0	—		—		5	3	41	12
São José-RS	Total		45	9	29	1	4	0	—		14	7	92	17
Grêmio (loan)	2021	Série A	0	0	1	0	0	0	—		—		1	0
Bahia (loan)	2022	Série B	0	0	2	0	0	0	—		—		2	0
Passo Fundo (loan)	2022	Gaúcho Série A2	—		—		—		—		5	0	5	0
Atlético Goianiense	2024	Série A	0	0	0	0	0	0	—		—		0	0
Career total			45	9	32	1	4	0	0	0	19	7	100	17

== Honours ==
Grêmio

- Campeonato Gaúcho: 2021
- Recopa Gaúcha: 2021

Paysandu

- Campeonato Paraense:2026
- Copa Norte: 2026
- Copa Verde: 2026
