= Kleiton Pego =

Brazilian footballer

Kleiton
Personal information
- Full name: Kleiton Pego Duarte
- Date of birth: 23 April 1999 (age 27)
- Place of birth: Ipatinga, Brazil
- Height: 1.80 m (5 ft 11 in)
- Positions: Winger; midfielder

Team information
- Current team: Paysandu (on loan from Athletico Paranaense)
- Number: 75

Youth career
- Atlético Mineiro
- –2020: Athletico Paranaense

Senior career*
Years	Team	Apps	(Gls)
2020–	Athletico Paranaense	11	(1)
2020–2021	→ Santa Cruz (loan)	3	(0)
2022–2023	→ Tombense (loan)	65	(3)
2024	→ Juventude (loan)	13	(0)
2024	→ CRB (loan)	20	(2)
2025	→ Operário-PR (loan)	29	(2)
2026–	→ Paysandu (loan)	32	(7)
- * Club domestic league appearances and goals as of 9 November 2026

Kleiton Pego Duarte (born 23 April 1999), simply known as Kleiton, is a Brazilian footballer who plays as either a winger or midfielder for Paysandu, on loan from Athletico Paranaense.

== Career statistics ==
=== Club ===
As of 13 October 2021.

Club	Season	League			State league		Cup		Continental		Other		Total	
Club	Season	Division	Apps	Goals	Apps	Goals	Apps	Goals	Apps	Goals	Apps	Goals	Apps	Goals
Athletico Paranaense	2020	Série A	0	0	6	1	0	0	—		—		6	1
Athletico Paranaense	2021	Série A	0	0	4	0	0	0	0	0	—		4	0
Athletico Paranaense	Total		0	0	10	1	0	0	0	0	—		10	1
Santa Cruz (loan)	2020	Série C	3	0	0	0	—		—		2 (Note: Appearance(s) in Copa do Nordeste)	0	5	0
Career total			3	0	10	1	0	0	0	0	2	0	15	1

== Honours ==
Athletico Paranaense

- Campeonato Paranaense: 2020

Paysandu

- Campeonato Paraense: 2026
- Copa Norte: 2026
- Copa Verde: 2026
