= Cássio Gabriel =

Brazilian footballer (born 1992)

Personal information
- Full name: Cássio Gabriel Vilela Ferreira
- Date of birth: 29 August 1992 (age 34)
- Place of birth: Patrocínio, Minas Gerais, Brazil
- Height: 1.75 m (5 ft 9 in)
- Position: Attacking midfielder

Team information
- Current team: Anápolis

Youth career
- Fluminense

Senior career*
| Years | Team | Apps | (Gls) |
| 2010 | Fluminense | 0 | (0) |
| 2011 | Paulínia | 8 | (1) |
| 2012 | Porto-PE | 16 | (0) |
| 2012–2013 | Hajduk Split | 0 | (0) |
| 2013 | Paysandu | 1 | (0) |
| 2014 | Esportivo-RS | 6 | (1) |
| 2014 | Anápolis | 5 | (0) |
| 2014 | Guarani | 10 | (1) |
| 2016 | Anápolis | 1 | (0) |
| 2016 | Penapolense | 7 | (0) |
| 2017 | Taubaté | 19 | (4) |
| 2017–2018 | São Bento | 25 | (1) |
| 2018 | → XV de Piracicaba (loan) | 17 | (4) |
| 2019 | XV de Piracicaba | 32 | (6) |
| 2020 | Botafogo-PB | 20 | (1) |
| 2020–2021 | Mirassol | 38 | (5) |
| 2021–2022 | Vila Nova | 12 | (0) |
| 2021–2022 | → Mumbai City (loan) | 21 | (1) |
| 2023 | Ponte Preta | 32 | (3) |
| 2023–2024 | Operário Ferroviário | 30 | (1) |
| 2024–2025 | Ferroviária | 26 | (3) |
| 2025 | Botafogo-PB | 5 | (1) |
| 2026 | Capivariano | 5 | (0) |
| 2026– | Anápolis | 4 | (1) |
- * Club domestic league appearances and goals as of 11 November 2026

Cássio Gabriel Vilela Ferreira (born 29 August 1992), better known as Cássio Gabriel or Cássinho, is a Brazilian professional footballer who plays as an attacking midfielder for Anápolis.

== Club career ==
=== Earlier career ===
Fondly known as 'Cássinho', Gabriel started his youth career at Fluminense's under 20 side and went on to play for a number of Brazilian clubs such as Paysandu SC, Clube Esportivo Bento Gonçalves, Guarani, Anápolis, ASEEV-GO, Atlético Penapolense, Esporte Clube XV de Piracicaba, Esporte Clube São Bento, Botafogo Futebol Clube (PB) and Mirassol before joining Vila Nova Futebol Clube in June 2020.

Born in Patrocínio, Minas Gerais, Cássio can play on either wings or through the middle as an attacking mid, made 12 appearances for Vila Nova and has one assist to his name.

During his stint with Fluminense's youth side, the Patrocinio-born midfielder was also loaned to the Croatian club Hajduk Split in 2013, the only club he played for outside of his homeland. With Hajduk, he achieved success at the Croatian Football Cup, winning the title in 2013.

=== Mumbai City ===
On 26 August 2021, Gabriel moved to Indian Super League defending champions Mumbai City, on loan from Vila Nova.

On 22 November, he made his debut for the club against Goa, in a resounding 3–0 win. He scored his first goal for the club, on 9 December, against Jamshedpur, in a thrilling 4–2 win. He registered one goal along with five assists in 20 league appearances, as the Islanders finished on fifth place and failed to qualify for the playoffs.

He was later included in the club's 2022 AFC Champions League squad. He started in the club's AFC Champions League debut match, on 8 April, against Al Shabab which ended in a 3–0 defeat.

== Honours ==
HNK Hajduk Split

- Croatian Football Cup: 2012–13

XV de Piracicaba

- Copa Paulista: runner-up 2019

Mirassol

- Campeonato Brasileiro Série D: 2020
