= Copa Centro-Oeste =

- Organiser(s): Brazilian Football Confederation
- Founded: 1999; 27 years ago
- Region: Brazil's Central-West plus Espírito Santo and Tocantins
- Teams: 12
- Qualifier for: Copa do Brasil (third round); Copa Verde
- Current champions: (Goiás) Anápolis (1st title)
- Most championships: Goiás (3 titles)
- 2026 Copa Centro-Oeste

The Copa Centro-Oeste (English: Central-West Cup) is a Brazilian football competition contested between Central-West region teams, plus Espírito Santo and Tocantins. The champion secures a place in the third round of the following year's Copa do Brasil, as well as competing for the Copa Verde trophy against the winner of the Copa Norte.

== History ==
At the end of the 1960s and beginning of the 1970s, the first regional tournaments began to emerge in Brazilian football. However, it was in 1999 that the Copa Centro-Oeste came into being. Teams from the central-west region of Brazil participated, along with teams from Espírito Santo, from the southeast region, and Tocantins, in the northern region. Minas Gerais state clubs only competed in the first Copa Centro-Oeste edition, in 1999, joining the new Copa Sul-Minas in 2000. In 1999, the winner of the Copa Centro-Oeste qualified for the Copa CONMEBOL. From 2000 to 2002, the champion went on to compete in the Copa dos Campeões.

Following changes to the Brazilian football calendar, the tournament was discontinued in 2003. However, in October 2025, the CBF announced the return of the competition after 24 years.

== Format ==
The twelve clubs are divided into two groups of six clubs each. The top two teams from each group advance to the knockout stage. The semi-finals will be single matches, while the finals will be two-legged ties.

== List of champions ==
Year	Finals			Losing semi-finalists^{1}
Year	Winners	Score	Runners-up	Losing semi-finalists^{1}
1999	(Minas Gerais); Cruzeiro	3–0; 1–2; 0–0^{2}	(Goiás); Vila Nova	(Minas Gerais) Atlético Mineiro and (Mato Grosso) EC Operário
2000	Goiás	3–1; 5–1; Aggregate; 8–2	(Goiás); Vila Nova	(Mato Grosso) Juventude and (Espírito Santo) São Mateus
2001	Goiás	1–0; 1–1; Aggregate; 2–1	(Goiás); Vila Nova	(Federal District (Brazil)) Gama and (Espírito Santo) Serra
2002	Goiás	2–3; 3–0; Aggregate; 5–3	(Federal District (Brazil)); Gama	(Mato Grosso do Sul) Comercial and (Goiás) Vila Nova
Tournament was not held between 2003 and 2025.
2026; Details	(Goiás); Anápolis	3–0; 1–2; Aggregate; 4–2	(Espírito Santo) Rio Branco	(Federal District (Brazil)) Gama and (Goiás) Vila Nova

Note 1: Losing semi-finalists are listed in alphabetical order.

Note 2: Cruzeiro won for having made the best campaign.

== Records and statistics ==
=== Finalists ===
Club	Winners	Runners-up	Years won	Years runner-up
Goiás	3	0	2000, 2001, 2002	—
(Minas Gerais) Cruzeiro	1	0	1999	—
(Goiás) Anápolis	1	0	2026	—
(Goiás) Vila Nova	0	3	—	1999, 2000, 2001
(Federal District (Brazil)) Gama	0	1	—	2002
(Espírito Santo) Rio Branco	0	1	—	2026

=== Performance by State ===
State	Won	Runner-up
Goiás	4	3
Minas Gerais	1	0
Distrito Federal	0	1
Espírito Santo	0	1
