= Evaristo Piza =

Brazilian football manager (born 1972)

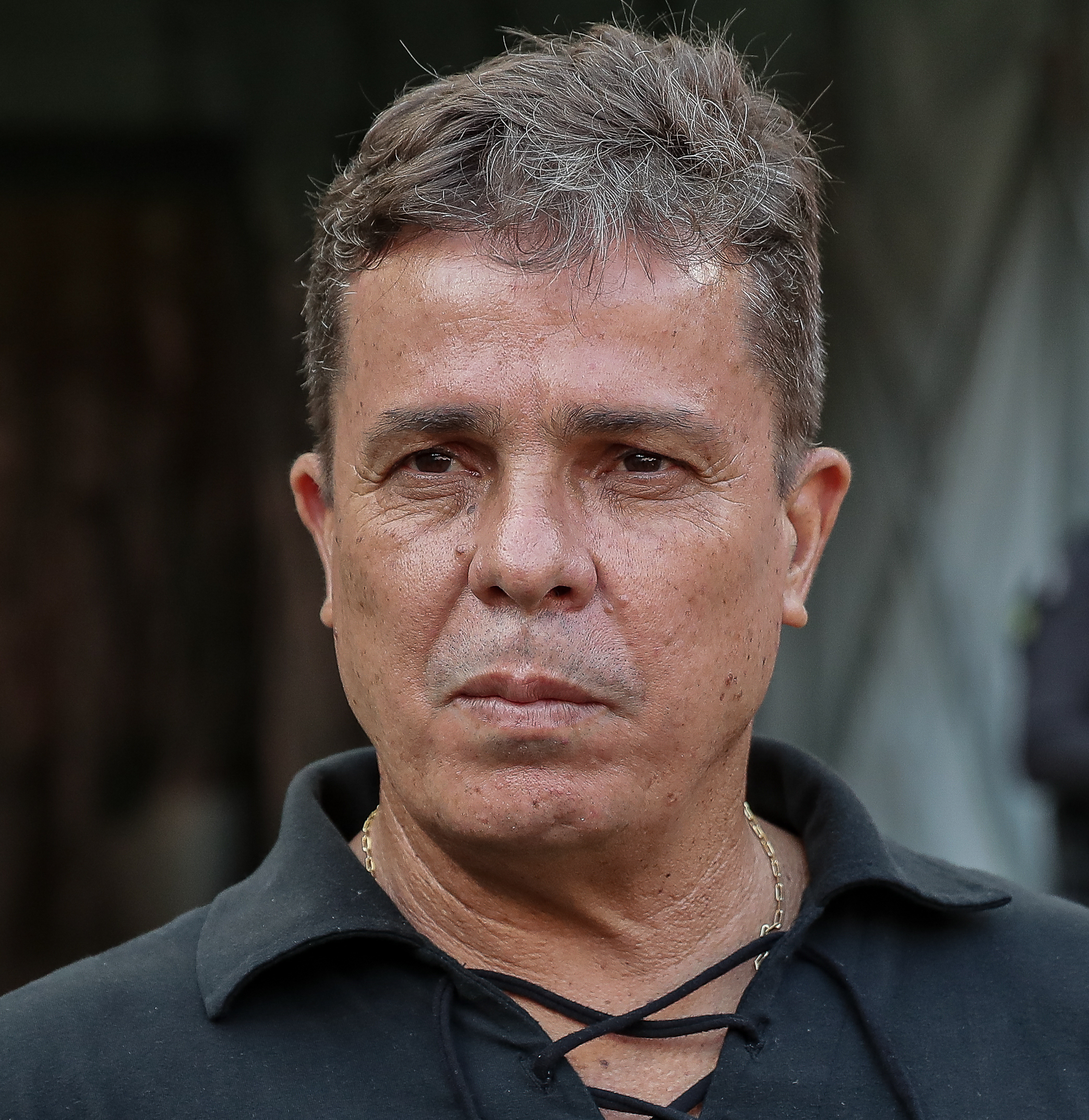
- Piza in 2025

Personal information
- Full name: Evaristo de Toledo Piza
- Date of birth: 27 July 1972 (age 54)
- Place of birth: Campinas, Brazil
- Position: Midfielder

Team information
- Current team: Barra-SC (head coach)

Youth career
- 1985–1990: Guarani
- 1990–1992: Flamengo
- 1992–1993: Corinthians

Senior career*
Years	Team	Apps	(Gls)
1993–1996	Ituano		
1997	Olímpia		
1997	Al-Khaleej		
1998	Moto Club		
1999	Deportivo Pereira		
1999	Alianza Lima		
2000–2001	Comercial-SP		

Managerial career
- 2002–2003: Guarani U15
- 2005: Guarani U17
- 2006–2007: Nippon Bunri University
- 2008–2009: Paulínia (assistant)
- 2010–2011: Paulínia
- 2011: Primavera
- 2011: Portuguesa Santista
- 2012: Barretos
- 2013: Velo Clube
- 2013: Taubaté
- 2014: Capivariano
- 2014: Guarani
- 2015: Mirassol
- 2015–2016: Capivariano
- 2016: Penapolense
- 2017: Taubaté
- 2017–2018: XV de Piracicaba
- 2018–2020: Botafogo-PB
- 2020: XV de Piracicaba
- 2020: Botafogo-PB
- 2021: América de Natal
- 2021–2022: Manaus
- 2022: Manaus
- 2023: ASA
- 2023: Sampaio Corrêa
- 2023: Santa Cruz
- 2024: Luverdense
- 2024: Botafogo-PB
- 2025: Portuguesa-RJ
- 2025: Retrô
- 2025: ABC
- 2025: Botafogo-PB
- 2026: Campinense
- 2026: Anápolis
- 2026–: Barra-SC
- * Club domestic league appearances and goals

Evaristo de Toledo Piza (born 27 July 1972) is a Brazilian football coach and former player who played as a midfielder. He is the current head coach of Barra-SC.

== Honours ==
=== Manager ===
Capivariano

- Campeonato Paulista Série A2: 2014

Botafogo-PB

- Campeonato Paraibano: 2019
