= 1997 Copa Norte =

1st edition of a Brazilian association football competition

Tournament details
- Country: Brazil
- Dates: 23 March – 4 May
- Teams: 10

Final positions
- Champions: (Acre (state)) Rio Branco (1st title)
- Runners-up: (Pará) Remo

Tournament statistics
- Matches played: 22
- Goals scored: 48 (2.18 per match)
- Top goal scorer(s): (Brazil) Edil (5 goals)

The 1997 Copa Norte was the first edition of a football competition held in Brazil, featuring 10 clubs. Acre and Pará have two clubs whilst Amapá, Amazonas, Maranhão, Piauí, Rondônia and Roraima each have one.

In the finals, Rio Branco defeated Remo 2–1 on aggregate to win their first title and earn the right to play in the 1997 Copa CONMEBOL.

== Qualified teams ==
Association	Team	Qualification method
(Acre (state)) Acre; 2 berths	Rio Branco	1996 Campeonato Acreano runners-up
(Acre (state)) Acre; 2 berths	Independência	1996 Campeonato Acreano 3rd place
(Amapá) Amapá; 1 berth	Ypiranga	
(Amazonas (Brazilian state)) Amazonas; 1 berth	Nacional	1996 Campeonato Amazonense champions
(Maranhão) Maranhão; 1 berth	Imperatriz	
(Pará) Pará; 2 berths	Remo	1996 Campeonato Paraense champions
(Pará) Pará; 2 berths	Tuna Luso	1996 Campeonato Paraense runners-up
(Piauí) Piauí; 1 berth	4 de Julho	
(Rondônia) Rondônia; 1 berth	Ji-Paraná	1996 Campeonato Rondoniense runners-up
(Roraima) Roraima; 1 berth	Baré	1996 Campeonato Roraimense runners-up

== Group stage ==
=== Group A ===
Pos	Team	Pld	W	D	L	GF	GA	GD	Pts	Qualification
1	(Pará) Remo (A)	4	4	0	0	10	1	+9	12	Advance to the Finals
2	(Maranhão) Imperatriz	4	2	1	1	8	7	+1	7	
3	(Amapá) Ypiranga	4	0	3	1	2	4	−2	3	
4	(Piauí) 4 de Julho	4	0	2	2	4	8	−4	2	
5	(Pará) Tuna Luso	4	0	2	2	4	8	−4	2	

Source: Bola na Área
(A) Advance to a further round

=== Group B ===
Pos	Team	Pld	W	D	L	GF	GA	GD	Pts	Qualification
1	(Acre (state)) Rio Branco (A)	4	3	1	0	6	1	+5	10	Advance to the Finals
2	(Rondônia) Ji-Paraná	4	2	2	0	3	1	+2	8	
3	(Amazonas (Brazilian state)) Nacional	4	1	2	1	4	6	−2	5	
4	(Acre (state)) Independência	4	1	0	3	2	4	−2	3	
5	(Roraima) Baré	4	0	1	3	2	5	−3	1	

Source: Bola na Área
(A) Advance to a further round

== Finals ==
17 April 1997

Rio Branco (Acre (state))	0–0	(Pará) Remo

Estádio José de Melo, Rio Branco

4 May 1997
16:00 UTC−3

Remo (Pará)	1–2	(Acre (state)) Rio Branco
Edil 61'		Venícius 60'; Palmiro 75'

Mangueirão, Belém
Attendance: 48,752
Referee: Hands Wellington Oliveira

Rio Branco won 2–1 on aggregate.
