= Associação Atlética Anapolina =

Brazilian football club

Anapolina
- Full name: Associação Atlética Anapolina
- Nicknames: Rubra; Xata
- Founded: 1 January 1948; 78 years ago
- Ground: Jonas Duarte, Anápolis, Brazil
- Capacity: 20,000
- Chairman: Nélio Carneiro
- Manager: Waldemar Lemos
- League: Campeonato Goiano
- 2025: Goiano Segunda Divisão, 1st of 8 (champions)
Home colours	Away colours	Third colours

Associação Atlética Anapolina, or Anapolina as they are usually called, is a Brazilian football team from Anápolis in Goiás, founded on January 1, 1948.

Anapolina greatest rival is Anápolis.

Home stadium is the Jonas Duarte stadium, capacity 19,000. They play in red shirts, shorts and socks.

== History ==
The team was founded after a club called Anápolis Sport had gone bankrupt. On April 18, 1948, Anapolina played its first match, against Ferroviário of Araguari. Anapolina won by 3–2. On March 11, 1949, Anapolina played its first interstate match, against Bangu of Rio de Janeiro city, in Anápolis. The match was won by Bangu, and the score was 4–2.

== Honours ==
=== Official tournaments ===
State
Competitions	Titles	Seasons
Copa Goiás	1	1995
Campeonato Goiano Second Division	2	2013, 2025

=== Others tournaments ===
==== State ====
- Campeonato Goiano do Interior (1): 2011

==== City ====
- Campeonato Citadino de Anápolis (6): 1949, 1950, 1951, 1952, 1956, 1960
- Taça Cidade de Anápolis (2): 1980, 1984

=== Runners-up ===
- Campeonato Brasileiro Série B (1): 1981
- Campeonato Goiano (2): 1981, 1983
- Campeonato Goiano Second Division (1): 2017
