= Gonzalo (footballer, born 1999) =

Brazilian footballer

Personal information
- Full name: Gonzalo Schnorr Fornari
- Date of birth: 9 December 1999 (age 26)
- Place of birth: Lajeado, Brazil
- Height: 2.01 m (6 ft 7 in)
- Position: Forward

Team information
- Current team: Cong An Nhan Dan
- Number: 86

Youth career
- 2016–2018: Lajeadense
- 2017: → Novo Hamburgo (loan)
- 2019: Ponte Preta

Senior career*
Years	Team	Apps	(Gls)
2019–2020	São José-RS	11	(0)
2021	Esportivo	3	(0)
2021	Anápolis	4	(0)
2021–2023	Red Bull Bragantino	3	(0)
2022	→ Red Bull Bragantino II (loan)	13	(0)
2023	→ Anápolis (loan)	15	(6)
2023	Inter de Limeira	7	(1)
2023	Jataiense	9	(6)
2024–2025	Anápolis	37	(7)
2025–2026	Busan IPark	37	(7)
2026	Anápolis	27	(1)
2026–	Cong An Nhan Dan	1	(0)
- * Club domestic league appearances and goals as of 6 October 2026

Gonzalo Schnorr Fornari (born 9 December 1999), simply known as Gonzalo, is a Brazilian professional footballer who plays as a forward for V.League 2 club Cong An Nhan Dan.

== Career ==
A striker who stands out for his height, Gonzalo's main characteristic is his headers. He played professionally for São José, Esportivo, Red Bull Bragantino, Anápolis and Jataiense, standing out for his performances in football in Goiás. On 14 March 2024, he missed a penalty in the final stoppage time of the match against Botafogo-SP in the 2024 Copa do Brasil, which culminated in the elimination of Anápolis. In February 2025, Gonzalo was transferred to Busan I-Park of the K League 2. In September 2026, he moved to Vietnam, signing for V.League 2 club Cong An Nhan Dan.
