= Poxoréu =

Coordinates: 15.8369°S 54.3889°W

Poxoréu Poxoréo
- Municipality
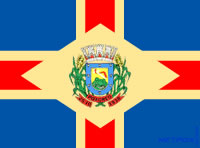
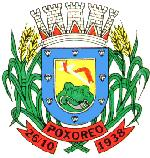
- Flag Coat of arms

- Country: Brazil
- Region: Center-West
- State: Mato Grosso
- Mesoregion: Sudeste Mato-Grossense

Population (2020)
  - Total: 15,916
- Time zone: UTC−3 (BRT)

Poxoréu (sometimes misspelled as Poxoréo) is a municipality in the state of Mato Grosso in the Central-West Region of Brazil.

The origins of the town date back to June 1924 which is when the first diamond gems were found in the area.

== See also ==
- List of municipalities in Mato Grosso
