= Gustavo Henrique (footballer, born May 1999) =

Brazilian footballer

Personal information
- Full name: Gustavo Henrique Alves Rodrigues
- Date of birth: 2 May 1999 (age 27)
- Place of birth: Edéia, Brazil
- Height: 1.76 m (5 ft 9 in)
- Position: Winger

Team information
- Current team: Estrela da Amadora

Youth career
- –2018: Trindade

Senior career*
Years	Team	Apps	(Gls)
2018–2023	Grêmio Anápolis	17	(5)
2018–2019	→ Braga (loan)	0	(0)
2019	→ Anápolis (loan)	11	(7)
2020–2022	→ Penafiel (loan)	34	(4)
2022–2023	→ Estrela da Amadora (loan)	19	(5)
2023–	Estrela da Amadora	27	(5)
2024–2025	→ Dibba (loan)		
- * Club domestic league appearances and goals as of 11 August 2023

Gustavo Henrique Alves Rodrigues (born 2 May 1999), commonly known as Gustavo Henrique, is a Brazilian footballer who plays as a winger for Estrela da Amadora.

== Career statistics ==
=== Club ===
As of 13 March 2021.

Club	Season	League			State League		Cup		Other		Total	
Club	Season	Division	Apps	Goals	Apps	Goals	Apps	Goals	Apps	Goals	Apps	Goals
Grêmio Anápolis	2018	–			7 (Note: Appearances in the Campeonato Goiano)	1	0	0	0	0	7	1
Grêmio Anápolis	2019	–			0	0	0	0	0	0	0	0
Grêmio Anápolis	2020	–			10	4	0	0	0	0	10	4
Grêmio Anápolis	2021	–			0	0	0	0	0	0	0	0
Grêmio Anápolis	Total		0	0	17	5	0	0	0	0	17	5
Braga	2018–19	Primeira Liga	0	0	–		0	0	0	0	0	0
Anápolis	2019	–			11 (Note: Appearances in the Campeonato Goiano Second Division)	7	0	0	0	0	11	7
Penafiel	2020–21	Liga Portugal 2	20	3	–		2 (Note: Appearances in the Taça de Portugal)	1	0	0	21	4
Career total			17	1	10	0	2	0	7	0	36	1
