= Sociedade Esportiva do Gama =

Brazilian association football club based in Gama, Federal District

Gama
- Full name: Sociedade Esportiva do Gama
- Nicknames: Verdão (Big Green); Periquito Verde (Green Parakeet); Alviverde do Centro-Oeste (Central West White and Green)
- Founded: 15 November 1975; 50 years ago
- Ground: Bezerrão
- Capacity: 20,310
- President: Wendel Lopes
- Head coach: Luiz Carlos Souza
- League: Campeonato Brasileiro Série D Campeonato Brasiliense
- 2025: Brasiliense, 1st of 10 (champions)
- Website: www.segama.com.br
Home colors	Away colors

Sociedade Esportiva do Gama, commonly referred to as Gama, is a Brazilian professional club based in Gama, Distrito Federal, founded on 15 November 1975. It competes in the Campeonato Brasileiro Série D, the fourth tier of Brazilian football, as well as in the Campeonato Brasiliense, the top flight of the Distrito Federal state football league.

== History ==
Until the early 1970s, the city of Gama was known only to its amateur teams. This movement has grown more and more the city's desire to have its first professional football club. Founded in 1975 by Hermínio Ferreira Neves, the Sociedade Esporte do Gama was the first professional team in the city. The founder was president of the amateur team Minas Atlético Clube.

Formed initially with players of the most diverse amateur teams of the city, Gama soon gained the support of the local population. They played their first professional game on February 21, 1976. With the support of Mr. Valmir Campelo de Bezerra, regional administrator of the city of Gama and a great admirer of local football, the Gama Administration Stadium was rebuilt and reopened on October 9, 1977.

In 1981, SE Gama achieved its first regional title. The team won the Torneio Centro-Oeste by beating Goiânia 2–1 on aggregate. In 1998, the club won the Campeonato Brasileiro Série B.

In late 2017, Gama confirmed that they would be signing former Brazilian World Cup winner Lúcio from Indian Super League side FC Goa. He joined in January 2018.

== Crest ==
On November 15, 1975, the day of its founding, the Sociedade Esportiva do Gama adopted as its first coat the coat of arms of the Federal District with the letters SEG. The symbol was a pillar of the Alvorada Palace. Intuitively, Mr. Hermínio Ferreira Neves, introduced the symbol in the Palmeiras uniform.

In 1999. the letters on the crest were changed to "GAMA".

== Rivalries ==
The club's main rival is Brasiliense.

== Stadium ==
Gama's stadium is Estádio Walmir Campelo Bezerra (Bezerrão), which has a maximum capacity of 20,310 people. The stadium is named after Antônio Walmir Campelo Bezerra, who was the regional administrator of Gama during the stadium's construction.

== Honours ==
=== Official tournaments ===
National
Competitions	Titles	Seasons
Campeonato Brasileiro Série B	1	1998
State
Competitions	Titles	Seasons
Campeonato Brasiliense	15	1979, 1990, 1994, 1995, 1997, 1998, 1999, 2000, 2001, 2003, 2015, 2019, 2020, 2025, 2026

- record

=== Others tournaments ===
==== Regional ====
- Torneio Centro-Oeste (1): 1981

=== Runners-up ===
- Campeonato Brasileiro Série C (1): 2004
- Copa Verde (1): 2016
- Copa Centro-Oeste (1): 2002
- Campeonato Brasiliense (6): 1980, 1993, 1996, 2002, 2006, 2011
