= Fernandinho (footballer, born 2003) =

Brazilian footballer

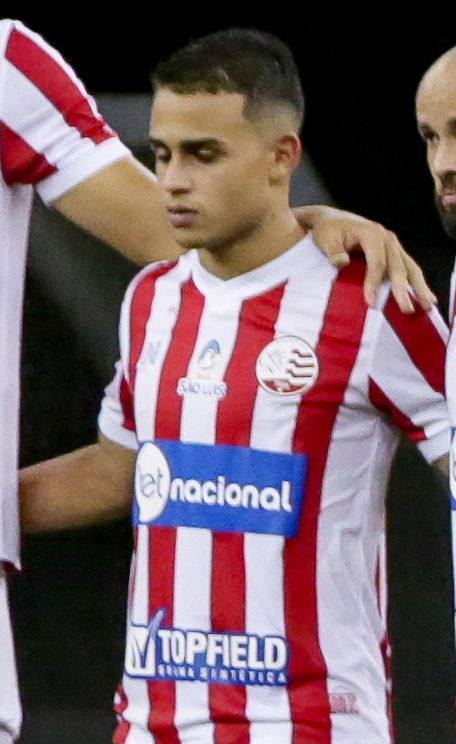
- Fernandinho with Náutico in 2024

Personal information
- Full name: Fernando Paiva Correa
- Date of birth: 20 March 2003 (age 23)
- Place of birth: Uberaba, Brazil
- Height: 1.71 m (5 ft 7 in)
- Position: Forward

Team information
- Current team: Anápolis

Youth career
- 2013: Oeste
- 2015–2023: Santos

Senior career*
Years	Team	Apps	(Gls)
2021–2024	Santos	1	(0)
2024	→ Náutico (loan)	9	(0)
2025	Ituano	16	(3)
2025–	Anápolis	6	(2)
- * Club domestic league appearances and goals as of 18:41, 13 November 2025 (UTC)

Fernando Paiva Correa (born 20 March 2003), commonly known as Fernandinho, is a Brazilian footballer who plays as a forward for Anápolis.

== Club career ==
Born in Uberaba, Minas Gerais, Fernandinho joined Santos' youth setup in 2015, aged 12. On 14 December 2019, he signed his first professional contract with the club.

Fernandinho made his first team debut for Peixe on 3 March 2021, coming on as a late substitute for Allanzinho in a 1–1 Campeonato Paulista home draw against Ferroviária. He subsequently returned to the under-20 squad, and renewed his contract until the end of 2024 on 25 March 2022.

On 13 December 2023, after finishing his formation, Fernandinho was loaned to Náutico for the upcoming season. On 2 January 2025, he signed for Ituano.

== Career statistics ==
As of 13 November 2025

Club	Season	League			State League		Cup		Continental		Other		Total	
Club	Season	Division	Apps	Goals	Apps	Goals	Apps	Goals	Apps	Goals	Apps	Goals	Apps	Goals
Santos	2021	Série A	0	0	1	0	0	0	0	0	6 (Note: Appearance(s) in Copa Paulista)	0	7	0
Náutico (loan)	2024	Série C	0	0	9	0	0	0	—		2 (Note: Appearance(s) in Copa do Nordeste)	0	11	0
Ituano	2025	Série C	—		16	3	—		—		—		16	3
Anápolis	2025	Série C	6	2	—		—		—		—		6	2
Career total			6	2	26	3	0	0	0	0	8	0	40	5
