= Leomar Quintanilha =

Brazilian politician (born 1945)

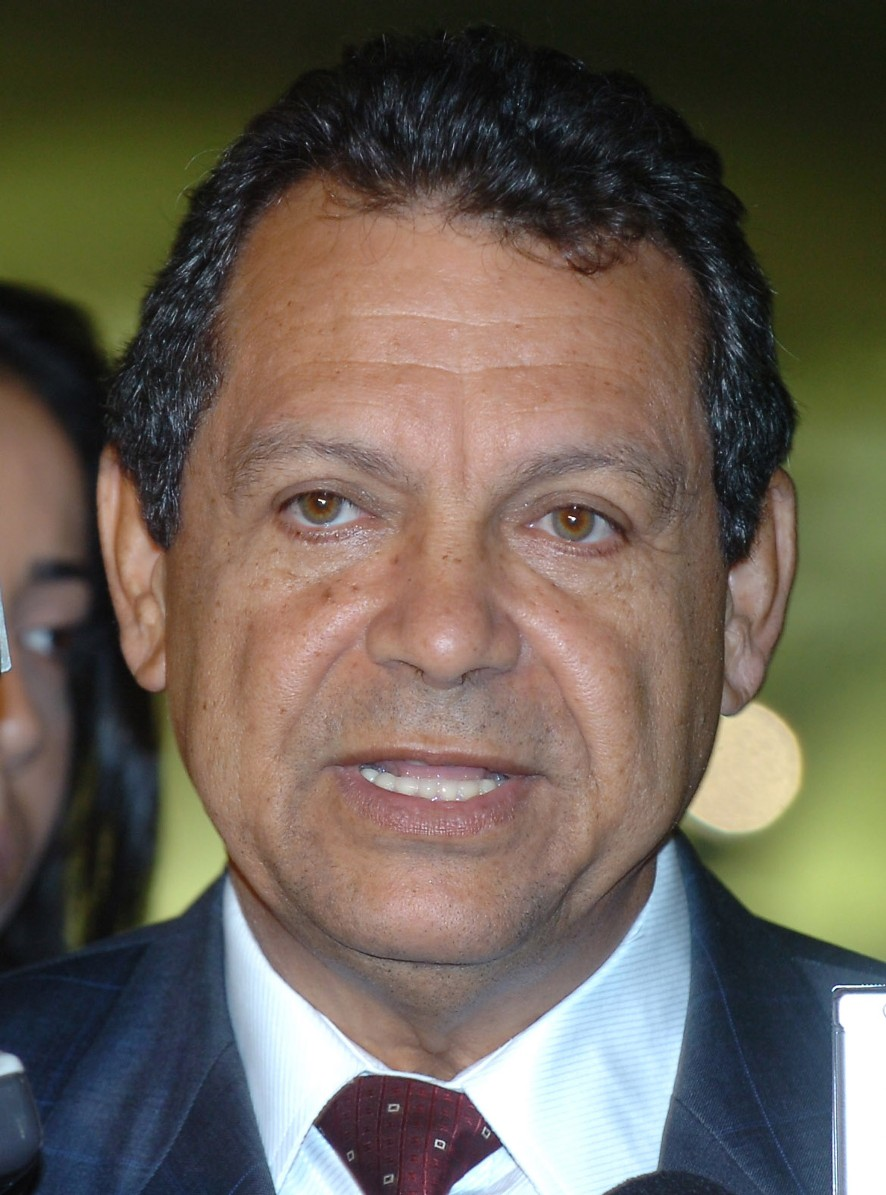
Quintanilha in 2007

Leomar de Melo Quintanilha (born October 23, 1945, in Goiânia) is a Brazilian politician. Formerly a banker with the Banco do Brasil, he served in the Chamber of Deputies representing Tocantins from 1989 until 1995; since 1994 he has represented the state in the Senate of Brazil. He is a member of the Brazilian Democratic Movement Party. He is the president of the Federação Tocantinense de Futebol since its foundation in 1990.
