= Estádio Jonas Duarte =

Multi-use stadium in Anápolis, Brazil

Coordinates: 16°20′46.85″S 48°57′20.74″W

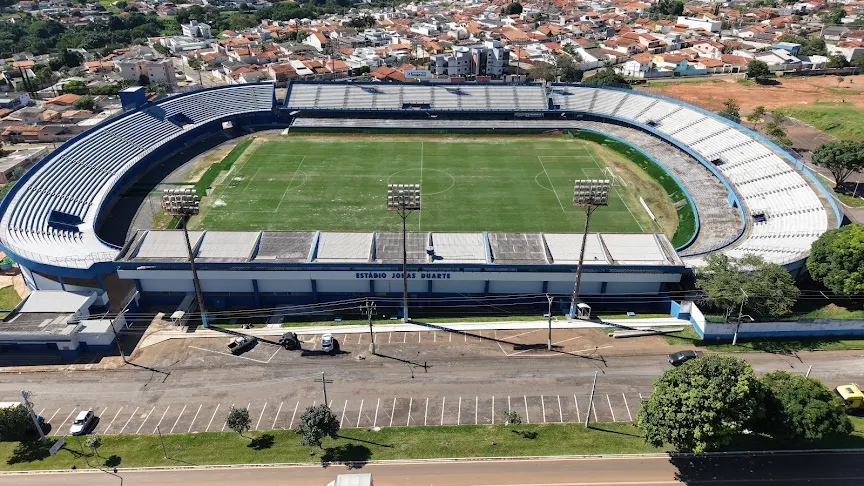
- Interactive map of Estádio Jonas Duarte
- Full name: Estádio Jonas Ferreira Alves Duarte
- Location: Anápolis, Brazil
- Owner: Anápolis City Hall
- Capacity: 20,000
- Surface: Grass
- Field size: 105 x 75m

Construction
- Opened: 10 April 1965

Tenants
- Associação Atlética Anapolina; Anápolis Futebol Clube; Grêmio Esportivo Anápolis; Grêmio Esportivo Inhumense

Estádio Jonas Ferreira Alves Duarte is a multi-use stadium located in Anápolis, Brazil. It is used mostly for football matches and hosts the home matches of Associação Atlética Anapolina, Anápolis Futebol Clube, Grêmio Esportivo Anápolis and Grêmio Esportivo Inhumense. The stadium has a maximum capacity of 20,000 people and was built in 1965. It is named after Jonas Ferreira Alves Duarte, who was the mayor of Anápolis in the 1950s, and was Goiás state vice-governor in 1954 and in 1955.

== History ==
The stadium was inaugurated on 10 April 1965, when São Paulo beat an Anápolis City Combined Team 4–1. The first goal of the stadium was scored by São Paulo's player Paraná.

The stadium's attendance record currently stands at 17,800 people, set on 15 September 1981, when Anapolina and Corinthians drew 1-1.
