= Mila (footballer) =

Brazilian footballer

Personal information
- Full name: Lucas Eduardo Müller
- Date of birth: 28 January 2003 (age 23)
- Place of birth: Três Passos, Brazil
- Height: 1.76 m (5 ft 9 in)
- Position: Defensive midfielder

Team information
- Current team: Tombense (on loan from Grêmio)

Youth career
- Internacional
- 2016–2017: Três Passos
- 2017–2023: Grêmio

Senior career*
Years	Team	Apps	(Gls)
2022–	Grêmio	8	(0)
2022	→ São Luiz (loan)	0	(0)
2025–	→ Tombense (loan)	4	(0)
- * Club domestic league appearances and goals as of 12 March 2025

Lucas Eduardo Müller (born 28 January 2003), commonly known as Mila, is a Brazilian professional footballer who plays as a defensive midfielder for Tombense on loan from Grêmio.

== Career ==
Born in Três Passos, Rio Grande do Sul, Mila joined Grêmio's youth setup in 2017, after representing hometown side Três Passos and Internacional. On 26 December 2021, he was loaned to São Luiz for the 2022 Campeonato Gaúcho.

Despite making no appearances for the side, Mila returned to Grêmio and renewed his contract until 2023 on 4 June 2022. He made his professional – and Série A – debut on 30 April 2023, starting in a 2–1 away win over Cuiabá.

== Personal life ==
Mila's older brother Luís Fernando and father Edson are also involved with football. Both nicknamed Milla (with an extra "L"), his brother plays as a forward for Ceilândia, while his father played as a goalkeeper for clubs in their native state.

== Career statistics ==
As of 2 May 2023

Appearances and goals by club, season and competition
Club	Season	League			State League		National Cup		Continental		Other		Total	
Club	Season	Division	Apps	Goals	Apps	Goals	Apps	Goals	Apps	Goals	Apps	Goals	Apps	Goals
São Luiz	2022	Série D	0	0	0	0	—		—		—		0	0
Grêmio	2023	Série A	1	0	0	0	0	0	—		—		1	0
Career total			1	0	0	0	0	0	0	0	0	0	1	0

== Honours ==
Grêmio

- Campeonato Gaúcho: 2023, 2024
