= Federação Tocantinense de Futebol =

Brazilian football state federation

- Formation: 7 April 1990; 36 years ago
- Type: List of international sport federations
- Headquarters: Palmas, TO, Brazil
- Official language: Portuguese
- President: Leomar Quintanilha
- Website: www.ftf.org.br

The Federação Tocantinense de Futebol (English: Football Association of Tocantins state) was founded on April 7, 1990, and it manages all the official football tournaments within the state of Tocantins, which include the Campeonato Tocantinense and the Copa Tocantins, and represents the clubs at the Brazilian Football Confederation (CBF). Politician Leomar Quintanilha is the president of the organization since its foundation.
