= Paysandu Sport Club =

Association football club based in Belém, Pará, Brazil

Paysandu
- Full name: Paysandu Sport Club
- Nicknames: Papão da Curuzu (Bogeyman of Curuzu); Bicolor (Bicoloured); Lobo (Wolf); Alviceleste (White and sky blue)
- Founded: 2 February 1914; 112 years ago
- Ground: Estádio da Curuzu; Mangueirão
- Capacity: 16,882; 55,000
- President: Márcio Tuma
- Head coach: Ignácio Neto
- League: Campeonato Brasileiro Série C Campeonato Paraense
- 2025 2025: Série B, 20th of 20 (relegated); Paraense, 2nd of 12
- Website: paysandu.com.br
| Home colors | Away colors | Third colors |

Paysandu Sport Club, commonly referred to as Paysandu, is a Brazilian professional club based in Belém, Pará, founded on 2 February 1914. It competes in the Campeonato Brasileiro Série C, the third tier of Brazilian football, as well as in the Campeonato Paraense, the top flight of the Pará state football league.

== History ==
On February 2, 1914, members of Norte Club protested against a decision of the football federation of Pará benefiting Remo by terminating the team and refounding another team. Unanimously, the assembly chose Hugo Leão to chair the meeting. As the leader of the movement, he proposed the name of Paysandu Football Club for the new club. The name was chosen as a tribute to the unfortunate event in Paysandú, an Uruguayan city, which would take the start of the war against Paraguay.

That year, the Norte Club held a good campaign and needed to beat Guarany to force an extra match against Grupo do Remo. After the match finished in a draw, the members of the Norte Club asked the Pará state League to cancel the match due to various irregularities. However, the league board dismissed the appeal. The decision did not please members of the Norte Club, who then started a movement, under the leadership of Hugo Leão, for the foundation of a stronger, new association. This movement bothered the members of Grupo do Remo, who tried to persuade Hugo Leão to abandon the idea.

In February 1914, the newspaper O Estado do Pará made the call for the meeting of a new club. The call by the newspaper had a large effect, causing 42 athletes to attend the meeting, many of whom had been part of the Norte Club, in addition to other different associations. With the name now decided, the assembly elected the first president, Deodoro de Mendonça. The committee to draft the Statutes of the club was also chosen, with the ones elected being: Deodoro de Mendonça, Eurico Amanajás and Arnaldo Morais. The second meeting was held on February 10, 1914 at the same location of the first. More than 15 new members joined Paysandu, with the number of members being increased to 100 and all of them considered founding partners. At the third meeting, on February 19, 1914, Paysandu's status was revised from "Foot-Ball" to "Sport Club" after a vote in the assembly, with the aim of requesting Paysandu's affiliation within the Pará State League. So Paysandu Sport Club was officially founded on February 2, 1914.

In 1991 and 2001, Paysandu was the champion of Série B. In 2002 the club was champion of Copa Norte, and later, champion of Copa dos Campeões, beating powerhouse Palmeiras in the semi-finals, and then edging Cruzeiro on penalties after a 5-5 draw on aggregate, prequalified them as cup winners to the 2003 Copa Libertadores. Paysandu also won the Campeonato Paranaense that year, for a record third consecutive year.

Despite winning three trophies that year, in the 2002 Serie A Paysandu struggled, finishing 20th and only two points from relegation. The following season was very similar, with the club struggling in the league, and only avoiding relegation through goal difference.

However, the 2003 Copa Libertadores was much different. This was Paysandu's first participation in the competition, and they began by finishing the group stage undefeated (four wins and two draws), including a famous 6-2 victory over Cerro Porteño in Paraguay. In the round of 16, the club was faced with powerhouse Boca Juniors, who eventually won the competition and then the Intercontinental cup. In the first leg at La Bombonera, Paysandu won 1-0 with a goal from Iarley. Boca came back and won the second leg 4-2 in Belém, eliminating the Brazilians. Their 2004 Série A campaign was a lot better, with the club finishing comfortably in mid table, even though they started the season winless in the first nine matches. However in the 2005 Série A the team was relegated, finishing second to last and losing 25 out of 42 games, the most of any team that season. In 2006 the club was relegated from Serie A, until reaching promotion back to the second division in 2012. Since then, the club has been yoyoing between Serie B and C.

The club also has four titles of the Copa Verde, as well as being the largest state winners with a record 50 titles.

== Symbols ==
=== Crest ===
The crest is blue and white, with the initials PSC, in reference to the name Paysandu Sport Club. At the bottom, there is a winged foot. Crest creator Mário Bayma explained its meaning: "The team's goal of speed would never be equaled or surpassed by its opponents, because it would reach the limit of the flight." Above the shield are three stars, two silver stars symbolizing the Série B titles of 1991 and 2001, and one gold star (central) symbolizing the title of Copa dos Campeões in 2002.

=== Anthem ===
The official anthem of Paysandu was composed in 1916 by the poet José Simões, while the music was made by Professor Manuel Luís de Paiva. There is also the "popular" hymn, composed by Francisco Pires Cavalcanti, excited about the victory of Paysandu against Peñarol in 1965, which is better known than the official team anthem.

=== Traditional home kit ===
The uniform was proposed by Hugo Leão, first president of Paysandu, at the meeting held on February 10, 1914. The proposal was only approved by the general assembly, by unanimous vote of the members, on February 19, 1914, seventeen days after the foundation of the club. The uniform follows the same model to the present day.

== Rivalries ==
Paysandu's biggest rival is Remo, with whom it plays the Clássico Rei da Amazônia (Amazon King derby) or Re-Pa. The first game took place on 14 June 1914, with Remo winning 2–1. On 26 July 1945, the biggest score in the derby took place. Paysandu won 7–0 in a match valid for the Campeonato Paraense of that year. In 2016, the derby was declared intangible cultural heritage of the Pará state, being qualified as a cultural expression of the people of Pará.

A further minor rivalry exists between Paysandu and Tuna Luso. The first match happened on 11 December 1932, a friendly that ended tied at 3–3.

== Stadium ==
Paysandu's stadium is Curuzu, which has a maximum capacity of 16,200 people. Mangueirão also held several Paysandu matches, such as Copa Libertadores matches and Campeonato Brasileiro matches against high-profile clubs.

== Players ==
=== First team squad ===
As of 4 October 2026

Note: Flags indicate national team as defined under FIFA eligibility rules; some limited exceptions apply. Players may hold more than one non-FIFA nationality.

| No. | Pos. | Nation | Player |
|---|---|---|---|
| 1 | GK | BRA | Jean Drosny |
| 2 | DF | BRA | Edílson |
| 3 | DF | BRA | Gustavo Henrique (on loan from Portuguesa) |
| 4 | DF | BRA | Iarley |
| 5 | MF | BRA | Henrico |
| 8 | MF | BRA | Caio Mello |
| 9 | FW | BRA | Ítalo (on loan from Volta Redonda) |
| 10 | MF | BRA | Marcinho (captain) |
| 12 | GK | BRA | Gabriel Mesquita |
| 14 | DF | BRA | Bruno Bispo |
| 15 | DF | BRA | Castro |
| 18 | DF | BRA | Eduardo |
| 19 | FW | BRA | Thayllon (on loan from Atlético Goianiense) |
| 20 | FW | URU | Nicolás Schiappacasse |
| 21 | DF | BRA | Renan Castro (on loan from Guarani) |
| 22 | DF | BRA | Lucas Rodrigues (on loan from América de Natal) |
| 23 | MF | BRA | Brian |

| No. | Pos. | Nation | Player |
|---|---|---|---|
| 25 | MF | BRA | Tiago Índio |
| 26 | MF | BRA | Cauã Libonati |
| 30 | FW | BRA | Thalyson |
| 31 | DF | URU | Facundo Bonifazi |
| 39 | MF | BRA | Pedro Henrique (on loan from Flamengo) |
| 40 | GK | BRA | Levi |
| 41 | GK | BRA | Marcão |
| 44 | DF | BRA | Pedro Carrerette (on loan from Noroeste) |
| 55 | MF | BRA | Radsley (on loan from Retrô) |
| 75 | FW | BRA | Kleiton Pego (on loan from Tombense) |
| 77 | DF | BRA | Luciano Taboca |
| 80 | MF | BRA | Pablo Baianinho (on loan from Vitória) |
| 94 | FW | BRA | Kauã Hinkel |
| 96 | MF | BRA | Matheus Vargas |
| 98 | FW | BRA | Juninho (on loan from Osasco Sporting) |
| 99 | MF | BRA | Lucas Cardoso |

==== Out on loan ====
Note: Flags indicate national team as defined under FIFA eligibility rules; some limited exceptions apply. Players may hold more than one non-FIFA nationality.

| No. | Pos. | Nation | Player |
|---|---|---|---|
| 13 | GK | BRA | Matheus Nogueira (at Ceará) |

== National league record ==
(C): Champion; (P): Promoted; (R): Relegated.

| Season | Tie | Division | Place | Copa do Brasil |
|---|---|---|---|---|
| 1971 | 2 | Segunda Divisão | 15° | |
| 1973 | 1 | Campeonato Nacional | 38° | |
| 1974 | 1 | Campeonato Nacional | 22° | |
| 1975 | 1 | Copa Brasil | 37° | |
| 1976 | 1 | Copa Brasil | 34° | |
| 1977 | 1 | Copa Brasil | 52° | |
| 1978 | 1 | Copa Brasil | 52° | |
| 1979 | 1 | Copa Brasil | 80° | |
| 1980 | 2 | Taça de Prata | 5° | |
| 1981 | 1 | Taça de Ouro | 28° | |
| 1982 | 1 | Taça de Ouro | 29° | |
| 1983 | 1 | Taça de Ouro | 34° (R)¹ | |
| 1983 | 2 | Taça de Prata | 14° | |
| 1985 | 1 | Taça de Ouro | 29° | |
| 1986 | 1 | Copa Brasil | 46° | |
| 1987 | 2 | Módulo Branco | 2° | |
| 1989 | 2 | Divisão Especial | 35° | First round |
| 1990 | 3 | Terceira Divisão | 5° | |
| 1991 | 2 | Série B | 1° (C) | Second round |
| 1992 | 1 | Série A | 20° (R)² | |

¹ Relegated in the same year.

² Relegation canceled.

| Season | Tie | Division | Place | Copa do Brasil |
|---|---|---|---|---|
| 1993 | 1 | Série A | 21° | Second round |
| 1994 | 1 | Série A | 16º | First round |
| 1995 | 1 | Série A | 23° (R) | |
| 1996 | 2 | Série B | 21° | |
| 1997 | 2 | Série B | 11° | Preliminary round |
| 1998 | 2 | Série B | 8° | |
| 1999 | 2 | Série B | 19° (R)² | First round |
| 2000 | 2 | Módulo Amarelo | 4° | First round |
| 2001 | 2 | Série B | 1° (C) | First round |
| 2002 | 1 | Série A | 20° | Second round |
| 2003 | 1 | Série A | 22° | |
| 2004 | 1 | Série A | 14° | |
| 2005 | 1 | Série A | 21° (R) | Second round |
| 2006 | 2 | Série B | 17° (R) | Second round |
| 2007 | 3 | Série C | 62° | Second round |
| 2008 | 3 | Série C | 12° | |
| 2009 | 3 | Série C | 8° | |
| 2010 | 3 | Série C | 6° | Second round |
| 2011 | 3 | Série C | 6° | Second round |
| 2012 | 3 | Série C | 4° (P) | Round of 16 |

| Season | Tie | Division | Place | Copa do Brasil |
|---|---|---|---|---|
| 2013 | 2 | Série B | 18° (R) | Third round |
| 2014 | 3 | Série C | 2° (P) | Third round |
| 2015 | 2 | Série B | 7° | Round of 16 |
| 2016 | 2 | Série B | 14° | Third round |
| 2017 | 2 | Série B | 11° | Round of 16 |
| 2018 | 2 | Série B | 17° (R) | First round |
| 2019 | 3 | Série C | 5° | Round of 16 |
| 2020 | 3 | Série C | 7° | Second round |
| 2021 | 3 | Série C | 8º | Second round |
| 2022 | 3 | Série C | 6º | Second round |
| 2023 | 3 | Série C | 4º (P) | Third round |
| 2024 | 2 | Série B | 13° | Second round |
| 2025 | 2 | Série B | 17° (R) | Third round |
| 2026 | 3 | Série C | | |

- 20 seasons in Campeonato Brasileiro Série A
- 20 seasons in Campeonato Brasileiro Série B
- 14 seasons in Campeonato Brasileiro Série C

== International record ==
| Season | Competition | Round | Opponent | Home | Away | Aggregate |
|---|---|---|---|---|---|---|
| 2003 | Copa Libertadores | Group 2 | (Paraguay) Cerro Porteño | 0-0 | 6-2 | 1st Place |
| 2003 | Copa Libertadores | Group 2 | (Peru) Sporting Cristal | 2-1 | 2-0 | 1st Place |
| 2003 | Copa Libertadores | Group 2 | (Chile) Universidad Católica | 3-1 | 1-1 | 1st Place |
| 2003 | Copa Libertadores | Round of 16 | (Argentina) Boca Juniors | 2-4 | 1-0 | 3-4 |

== Honours ==
=== Official tournaments ===
National
| Competitions | Titles | Seasons |
|---|---|---|
| Copa dos Campeões | 1^{s} | 2002 |
| Campeonato Brasileiro Série B | 2 | 1991, 2001 |
Regional
| Competitions | Titles | Seasons |
| Copa Verde | 6 | 2016, 2018, 2022, 2024, 2025, 2026 |
| Copa Norte | 2 | 2002, 2026 |
State
| Competitions | Titles | Seasons |
| Campeonato Paraense | 51 | 1920, 1921, 1922, 1923, 1927, 1928, 1929, 1931, 1932, 1934, 1939, 1942, 1943, 1944, 1945, 1947, 1956, 1957, 1959, 1961, 1962, 1963, 1965, 1966, 1967, 1969, 1971, 1972, 1976, 1980, 1981, 1982, 1984, 1985, 1987, 1992, 1998, 2000, 2001, 2002, 2005, 2006, 2009, 2010, 2013, 2016, 2017, 2020, 2021, 2024, 2026 |
| Super Copa Grão-Pará | 1^{s} | 2025 |

- record
- ^{s} shared record

=== Others tournaments ===
==== International ====
- International Triangular Tournament (1): 1953
- Belém International Quadrangular Tournament (1): 1965
- Paramaribo International Tournament (1): 2011

==== State ====
- Taça Cidade de Belém (7): 2005, 2006, 2009, 2010, 2011, 2013, 2016
- Taça Estado do Pará (2): 2005, 2014
- Torneio Início do Pará (17): 1917, 1926, 1929, 1930, 1932, 1933, 1937, 1938, 1944, 1957, 1958, 1962, 1965, 1966, 1967, 1969, 1970

=== Runners-up ===
- Campeonato Brasileiro Série C (1): 2014
- Copa Verde (4): 2014, 2017, 2019, 2023
- Copa Norte (1): 2001
- Campeonato Paraense (40): 1914, 1915, 1916, 1917, 1918, 1919, 1924, 1925, 1926, 1930, 1933, 1936, 1937, 1941, 1948, 1949, 1952, 1954, 1955, 1960, 1968, 1970, 1974, 1975, 1977, 1978, 1979, 1989, 1990, 1993, 1994, 1995, 1997, 1999, 2004, 2011, 2014, 2018, 2022, 2025

=== Women's Football ===
- Campeonato Paraense de Futebol Feminino (4): 1984, 1985, 1986, 2025
