= 2026 Copa Norte =

7th edition of a Brazilian association football competition

Tournament details
- Country: Brazil
- Dates: 24 March – 28 May
- Teams: 12

Final positions
- Champions: (Pará) Paysandu (2nd title)
- Runners-up: (Amazonas (Brazilian state)) Nacional

Tournament statistics
- Matches played: 34
- Goals scored: 121 (3.56 per match)
- Top goal scorer(s): (Brazil) Eric (Brazil) Kaio Wilker (4 goals each)

The 2026 Copa Norte was the 7th edition of the football competition held in Brazil. The 2026 edition marked the return of the competition, which has not been held since 2002. Featuring 12 clubs, Acre, Amazonas, Pará, Rondônia and Roraima have two vacancies; Amapá with one. The other one berth was set according to CBF ranking.

In the finals, Paysandu defeated Nacional 5–2 on aggregate to win their second title and a place in the third round of the 2027 Copa do Brasil and earned the right to play against 2026 Copa Centro-Oeste winners Anápolis in the 2026 Copa Verde.

== Qualified teams ==
| Association | Team | Qualification method |
|---|---|---|
| (Acre (state)) Acre; 2 berths | Independência | 2025 Campeonato Acreano champions |
| (Acre (state)) Acre; 2 berths | Galvez | 2025 Campeonato Acreano runners-up |
| (Amapá) Amapá; 1 berth | Trem | 2025 Campeonato Amapaense champions |
| (Amazonas (Brazilian state)) Amazonas; 2 berths | Amazonas | 2025 Campeonato Amazonense champions |
| (Amazonas (Brazilian state)) Amazonas; 2 berths | Nacional | 2025 Campeonato Amazonense runners-up |
| (Pará) Pará; 2+1 berths | Remo | 2025 Campeonato Paraense champions |
| (Pará) Pará; 2+1 berths | Paysandu | 2025 Campeonato Paraense runners-up |
| (Pará) Pará; 2+1 berths | Águia de Marabá | Best placed team in the 2026 CBF ranking not already qualified |
| (Rondônia) Rondônia; 2 berths | Porto Velho | 2025 Campeonato Rondoniense champions |
| (Rondônia) Rondônia; 2 berths | Guaporé | 2025 Campeonato Rondoniense runners-up |
| (Roraima) Roraima; 2 berths | GAS | 2025 Campeonato Roraimense champions |
| (Roraima) Roraima; 2 berths | Monte Roraima | 2025 Campeonato Roraimense runners-up |

== Schedule ==
The schedule of the competition is as follows.

| Phase | Round | First leg | Second leg |
|---|---|---|---|
| Group stage | Matchday 1 | 24, 25 and 26 March 2026 | |
| Group stage | Matchday 2 | 29, 30 and 31 March 2026 | |
| Group stage | Matchday 3 | 7, 8 and 9 April 2026 | |
| Group stage | Matchday 4 | 15 April 2026 | |
| Group stage | Matchday 5 | 29 April 2026 | |
| Knockout stage | Semi-finals | 6 May 2026 | |
| Knockout stage | Finals | 20 May 2026 | 28 May 2026 |

== Group stage ==
=== Group A ===
| Pos | Team | Pld | W | D | L | GF | GA | GD | Pts | Qualification |
|---|---|---|---|---|---|---|---|---|---|---|
| 1 | (Amazonas (Brazilian state)) Nacional (A) | 5 | 4 | 1 | 0 | 14 | 1 | +13 | 13 | Advance to Knockout stage |
| 2 | (Pará) Paysandu (A) | 5 | 3 | 0 | 2 | 8 | 10 | −2 | 9 | Advance to Knockout stage |
| 3 | (Rondônia) Guaporé | 5 | 2 | 1 | 2 | 4 | 6 | −2 | 7 | |
| 4 | (Amapá) Trem | 5 | 2 | 0 | 3 | 11 | 11 | 0 | 6 | |
| 5 | (Acre (state)) Independência | 5 | 1 | 2 | 2 | 4 | 8 | −4 | 5 | |
| 6 | (Roraima) GAS | 5 | 1 | 0 | 4 | 10 | 15 | −5 | 3 | |

Updated to match(es) played on 29 April 2026. Source: CBF
Rules for classification: 1) points; 2) wins; 3) goal difference; 4) goals scored; 5) fewest red cards; 6) fewest yellow cards; 7) drawing of lots.
(A) Advance to a further round

=== Group B ===
| Pos | Team | Pld | W | D | L | GF | GA | GD | Pts | Qualification |
|---|---|---|---|---|---|---|---|---|---|---|
| 1 | (Pará) Águia de Marabá (A) | 5 | 4 | 1 | 0 | 12 | 6 | +6 | 13 | Advance to Knockout stage |
| 2 | (Rondônia) Porto Velho (A) | 5 | 3 | 1 | 1 | 10 | 5 | +5 | 10 | Advance to Knockout stage |
| 3 | (Amazonas (Brazilian state)) Amazonas | 5 | 2 | 1 | 2 | 9 | 6 | +3 | 7 | |
| 4 | (Pará) Remo | 5 | 2 | 1 | 2 | 6 | 6 | 0 | 7 | |
| 5 | (Acre (state)) Galvez | 5 | 1 | 0 | 4 | 9 | 17 | −8 | 3 | |
| 6 | Monte Roraima | 5 | 0 | 2 | 3 | 9 | 15 | −6 | 2 | |

Updated to match(es) played on 29 April 2026. Source: CBF
Rules for classification: 1) points; 2) wins; 3) goal difference; 4) goals scored; 5) fewest red cards; 6) fewest yellow cards; 7) drawing of lots.
(A) Advance to a further round

== Knockout stage ==
=== Bracket ===
Semi-finals
(Pará) Águia de Marabá | 1
(Pará) Paysandu | 5
(Amazonas (Brazilian state)) Nacional (p) | 1 (2)
(Rondônia) Porto Velho | 1 (0)

Finals
(Pará) Paysandu | 1 | 4 | 5
(Amazonas (Brazilian state)) Nacional | 0 | 2 | 2

== Finals ==
20 May 2026
20:00 BRT (UTC−3)

| Paysandu (Pará) | 1–0 | (Amazonas (Brazilian state)) Nacional |
|---|---|---|
| Castro 52' | Report |

Mangueirão, Belém
Attendance: 33,143
Referee: Alisson Sidnei Furtado

28 May 2026
20:00 AMT (UTC−4)

| Nacional (Amazonas (Brazilian state)) | 2–4 | (Pará) Paysandu |
|---|---|---|
| Kaio Wilker 65', 75' | Report | Caio Mello 10'; Kleiton Pego 26'; Thayllon 50'; Marcinho 81' |

Estádio Municipal Carlos Zamith, Manaus
Attendance: 6,132
Referee: Paulo Henrique Schleich Vollkopf

Paysandu won 5–2 on aggregate.
