= Copa Verde =

- Organiser(s): Brazilian Football Confederation
- Founded: 2014; 12 years ago
- Region: Brazil's North and Central-West plus Espírito Santo
- Teams: 2
- Related competitions: Copa Centro-Oeste (qualifier); Copa Norte (qualifier)
- Current champions: (Pará) Paysandu (6th title)
- Most championships: (Pará) Paysandu (6 titles)
- Website: Official website
- 2026 Copa Verde

The Copa Verde (English: Green Cup) is an annual regional knockout football competition in Brazil that started in 2014, and played by 24 teams from the North and Central-West regions, plus Espírito Santo (Espírito Santo state was included because they competed in the old Copa Centro Oeste).

Initially, the champion of the tournament gained a place in the next year's Copa Sudamericana. With the changes implemented by CONMEBOL in 2016, the winners no longer qualify for the Copa Sudamericana. The champion will now have a spot in the third round of the Copa do Brasil of the following year. The cup is organized by the Brazilian Football Confederation (CBF), with two-legged playoff games played from between the 24 participating teams.

== History ==
The tournament was created with the purpose of making a version of the Copa do Nordeste for the Northern Region of Brazil, hence the name Verde, meaning green, is an allusion to the Amazon Rainforest. The competition was expanded to include clubs from the Central-West Region and from Espírito Santo state (as the state competed in the defunct Copa Centro-Oeste). The competition was officially announced in September by the competitions director of the Brazilian Football Confederation.

From 2026 onwards, the Copa Verde will be played in a supercup format between the winners of the Copa Centro-Oeste and the Copa Norte.

== List of champions ==
=== Tournament era ===
Year	Finals			Losing semi-finalists^{1}
Year	Winners	Score	Runners-up	Losing semi-finalists^{1}
2014; Details	(Federal District (Brazil)); Brasília	1–2; 2–1; Aggregate; 3–3 (7–6 p)^{2}	(Pará); Paysandu	(Federal District (Brazil)) Brasiliense and (Pará) Remo
2015; Details	(Mato Grosso); Cuiabá	1–4; 5–1; Aggregate; 6–5	(Pará); Remo	(Mato Grosso) Luverdense and (Pará) Paysandu
2016; Details	(Pará); Paysandu	2–0; 1–2; Aggregate; 3–2	(Federal District (Brazil)); Gama	(Goiás) Aparecidense and (Pará) Remo
2017; Details	(Mato Grosso); Luverdense	3–1; 1–1; Aggregate; 4–2	(Pará); Paysandu	(Rondônia) Rondoniense and (Amapá) Santos
2018; Details	(Pará); Paysandu	2–0; 1–1; Aggregate; 3–1	(Espírito Santo); Atlético Itapemirim	(Mato Grosso) Luverdense and (Amazonas (Brazilian state)) Manaus
2019; Details	(Mato Grosso); Cuiabá	0–1; 1–0; Aggregate; 1–1 (5–4 p)	(Pará); Paysandu	Goiás and (Pará) Remo
2020; Details	(Federal District (Brazil)); Brasiliense	2–1; 1–2; Aggregate; 3–3 (5–4 p)	(Pará); Remo	(Amazonas (Brazilian state)) Manaus and (Goiás) Vila Nova
2021; Details	(Pará); Remo	0–0; 0–0; Aggregate; 0–0 (4–2 p)	(Goiás); Vila Nova	(Mato Grosso) Nova Mutum and (Pará) Paysandu
2022; Details	(Pará); Paysandu	0–0; 1–1; Aggregate; 1–1 (4–3 p)	(Goiás); Vila Nova	(Federal District (Brazil)) Brasiliense and (Amazonas (Brazilian state)) São Raimundo
2023; Details	Goiás	2–0; 2–1; Aggregate; 4–1	(Pará); Paysandu	(Mato Grosso) Cuiabá and (Pará) Remo
2024; Details	(Pará); Paysandu	6–0; 4–0; Aggregate; 10–0	(Goiás); Vila Nova	(Mato Grosso) Cuiabá and (Pará) Remo
2025; Details	(Pará); Paysandu	0–0; 1–1; Aggregate; 1–1 (5–4 p)	Goiás	(Federal District (Brazil)) Brasiliense and (Roraima) São Raimundo

Note 1: Losing semi-finalists are listed in alphabetical order.

Note 2: On July 28, 2014, the 2014 Copa Verde title was awarded to Paysandu, due to irregularities on the squad of Brasília. Brasília appealed against this decision and obtained a suspension which reversed this decision temporarily. A final decision by the Superior Court of Sports Justice (STJD) declared Brasília as the champion.

=== Supercup era ===
Year
Year	Winners	Score	Runners-up
2026	(Pará); Paysandu	1–3; 4–0; Aggregate; 5–3	(Goiás); Anápolis

== Records and statistics ==
=== Finalists ===
Club	Winners	Runners-up	Years won	Years runner-up
(Pará) Paysandu	6	4	2016, 2018, 2022, 2024, 2025, 2026	2014, 2017, 2019, 2023
(Mato Grosso) Cuiabá	2	0	2015, 2019	—
(Pará) Remo	1	2	2021	2015, 2020
Goiás	1	1	2023	2025
(Federal District (Brazil)) Brasília	1	0	2014	—
(Mato Grosso) Luverdense	1	0	2017	—
(Federal District (Brazil)) Brasiliense	1	0	2020	—
(Goiás) Vila Nova	0	3	—	2021, 2022, 2024
(Federal District (Brazil)) Gama	0	1	—	2016
(Espírito Santo) Atlético Itapemirim	0	1	—	2018
(Goiás) Anápolis	0	1	—	2026

=== Performance by State ===
State	Won	Runner-up
Pará	7	6
Mato Grosso	3	0
Distrito Federal	2	1
Goiás	1	5
Espírito Santo	0	1

=== Top scorers ===
Year	Player (team)	Goals
2014	Lima (Paysandu)	7
2015	Raphael Luz (Cuiabá)	8
2016	Rafael Grampola (Gama)	6
2017	Careca (Rondoniense)	5
2018	Cassiano (Paysandu)	9
2019	Douglas Oliveira (Luverdense)	5
2020	Alan Mineiro (Vila Nova); Diego Rosa (Aparecidense)	5
2021	Neto Pessoa (Remo)	9
2022	Marlon (Paysandu); Yan Philippe (São Raimundo-AM)	3
2023	Wanderson (São Francisco-AC)	4
2024	Nicolas (Paysandu)	6
2025	Rossi (Paysandu)	4

=== Winning managers ===
Year	Manager	Club
2014	Luís Carlos Carioca	Brasília
2015	Fernando Marchiori	Cuiabá
2016	Dado Cavalcanti	Paysandu
2017	Júnior Rocha	Luverdense
2018	Dado Cavalcanti	Paysandu
2019	Marcelo Chamusca	Cuiabá
2020	Vilson Tadei	Brasiliense
2021	Eduardo Baptista	Remo
2022	Márcio Fernandes	Paysandu
2023	Emerson Ávila	Goiás
2024	Hélio dos Anjos	Paysandu
2025	Luizinho Lopes	Paysandu
2026	Júnior Rocha	Paysandu
