= Anápolis Futebol Clube =

Association football club in Brazil

Anápolis
- Full name: Anápolis Futebol Clube
- Nicknames: Tricolor da Boa Vista (Boa Vista's Tricolour); Galo da Comarca (District Rooster)
- Founded: 1 May 1946; 80 years ago
- Ground: Estádio Jonas Duarte
- Capacity: 14,400
- President: Ademir Marinho
- Head coach: Alan George
- League: Campeonato Brasileiro Série C Campeonato Goiano
- 2025 2025: Série C, 15th of 20; Goiano, 2nd of 12
Home colours	Away colours

Anápolis Futebol Clube, known simply as Anápolis, are a Brazilian football team based in Anápolis, Goiás. They competed in the Campeonato Brasileiro Parallel Tournament in 1986 and in the Série C in 2008.

== History ==
They were founded on 1 May 1946 as União Esportiva Operária, changing the name to Anápolis Futebol Clube five years later, after Anápolis Sport Club became defunct. The club won the Campeonato Goiano in 1965. Anápolis competed in the Campeonato Brasileiro Parallel Tournament in 1986, when they were eliminated in the first stage after finishing in the fourth place of their group. Anápolis competed in the Série C in 2008, when they were eliminated in the first stage, after finishing in their group's third place. In the 2025 Campeonato Goiano, Anápolis qualified to the final after beating Atlético Clube Goianiense over two legs by a score of 5–4.

== Stadium ==
Anápolis play their home games at Estádio Jonas Duarte. The stadium has a maximum capacity of 20,000 people.

== Honours ==
=== Official tournaments ===
Regional
Competitions	Titles	Seasons
Copa Centro-Oeste	1	2026
State
Competitions	Titles	Seasons
Campeonato Goiano	1	1965
Copa Goiás	1	1967
Campeonato Goiano Second Division	2	1990, 2012

=== Others tournaments ===
==== State ====
- Torneio Incentivo (1): 1980
- Campeonato Goiano do Interior (1): 1947
- Torneio Início do Campeonato Goiano (1): 1966

==== City ====
- Campeonato Citadino de Anápolis (2): 1954, 1958
- Taça Cidade de Anápolis (3): 1966, 1967, 2011

=== Runners-up ===
- Campeonato Brasileiro Série D (1): 2024
- Copa Verde (1): 2026
- Campeonato Goiano (4): 1968, 1995, 2016, 2025
- Campeonato Goiano Second Division (4): 2002, 2007, 2015, 2019

== Rivalry ==
Anápolis has a rivalry with Associação Atlética Anapolina.
