= Copa Norte =

- Organiser(s): Brazilian Football Confederation
- Founded: 1997; 29 years ago
- Region: Brazil's North
- Teams: 12
- Qualifier for: Copa do Brasil (third round); Copa Verde
- Current champions: (Pará) Paysandu (2nd title)
- Most championships: (Amazonas (Brazilian state)) São Raimundo (3 titles)
- 2026 Copa Norte

The Copa Norte (English: North Cup) is a Brazilian football competition contested between North region teams, with the exception of Tocantins. The champion secures a place in the third round of the following year's Copa do Brasil, as well as competing for the Copa Verde trophy against the winner of the Copa Centro-Oeste.

== History ==
At the end of the 1960s and beginning of the 1970s, the first regional tournaments began to emerge in Brazilian football. However, it was in 1997 that the Copa Norte came into being. Teams from the northern region of Brazil participated, with the exception of Tocantins, along with teams from Maranhão and Piauí, in the northeast region. From 1997 to 1999, the winner of the Copa Norte qualified for the Copa CONMEBOL. From 2000 to 2002, the champion went on to compete in the Copa dos Campeões.

Following changes to the Brazilian football calendar, the tournament was discontinued in 2003. However, in October 2025, the CBF announced the return of the competition after 24 years.

== Format ==
The twelve clubs are divided into two groups of six clubs each. The top two teams from each group advance to the knockout stage. The semi-finals will be single matches, while the finals will be two-legged ties.

== List of champions ==
Year	Finals			Losing semi-finalists^{1}
Year	Winners	Score	Runners-up	Losing semi-finalists^{1}
1997	(Acre (state)); Rio Branco	0–0; 2–1; Aggregate; 2–1	(Pará); Remo	(Maranhão) Imperatriz and (Rondônia) Ji-Paraná
1998	(Maranhão); Sampaio Corrêa	0–1; 2–1; Aggregate; 2–2 (3–0 p)	(Amazonas (Brazilian state)); São Raimundo	(Acre (state)) Rio Branco and (Amapá) Ypiranga
1999	(Amazonas (Brazilian state)); São Raimundo	0–1; 2–1; Aggregate; 2–2 (3–1 p)	(Maranhão); Sampaio Corrêa	(Rondônia) Cruzeiro and (Piauí) Flamengo
2000	(Amazonas (Brazilian state)); São Raimundo	2–3; 2–0; Aggregate; 4–3	Maranhão	(Pará) Remo and (Piauí) River
2001	(Amazonas (Brazilian state)); São Raimundo	0–1; 1–0; Aggregate; 1–1^{2}	(Pará); Paysandu	(Rondônia) Genus and (Piauí) River
2002	(Pará); Paysandu	1–0; 3–0; Aggregate; 4–0	(Amazonas (Brazilian state)); São Raimundo	(Rondônia) Ji-Paraná and (Pará) Remo
Tournament was not held between 2003 and 2025.
2026; Details	(Pará); Paysandu	1–0; 4–2; Aggregate; 5–2	(Amazonas (Brazilian state)); Nacional	(Pará) Águia de Marabá and (Rondônia) Porto Velho

Note 1: Losing semi-finalists are listed in alphabetical order.

Note 2: São Raimundo won for having made the best campaign.

== Records and statistics ==
=== Finalists ===
Club	Winners	Runners-up	Years won	Years runner-up
(Amazonas (Brazilian state)) São Raimundo	3	2	1999, 2000, 2001	1998, 2002
(Pará) Paysandu	2	1	2002, 2026	2001
(Maranhão) Sampaio Corrêa	1	1	1998	1999
(Acre (state)) Rio Branco	1	0	1997	—
(Pará) Remo	0	1	—	1997
Maranhão	0	1	—	2000
(Amazonas (Brazilian state)) Nacional	0	1	—	2026

=== Performance by State ===
State	Won	Runner-up
Amazonas	3	3
Pará	2	2
Maranhão	1	2
Acre	1	0
