= 2024 Copa Verde finals =

- Event: 2024 Copa Verde
Paysandu	Vila Nova
(Pará)	(Goiás)
10	0
- on aggregate

First leg
Paysandu	Vila Nova
6	0
- Date: 22 May 2024
- Venue: Estádio da Curuzu, Belém
- Referee: Davi de Oliveira Lacerda
- Attendance: 13,052

Second leg
Vila Nova	Paysandu
0	4
- Date: 29 May 2024
- Venue: Estádio Olímpico Pedro Ludovico, Goiânia
- Referee: Angleison Marcos Vieira Monteiro
- Attendance: 426

The 2024 Copa Verde finals was the final two-legged tie that decided the 2024 Copa Verde, the 11th season of the Copa Verde, Brazil's regional cup football tournament organised by the Brazilian Football Confederation.

The finals were contested in a two-legged home-and-away format between Paysandu, from Pará, and Vila Nova, from Goiás.

Paysandu defeated Vila Nova 10–0 on aggregate to win their fourth Copa Verde title.

== Teams ==
Team	Previous finals appearances (bold indicates winners)
(Pará) Paysandu	7 (2014, **2016**, 2017, **2018**, 2019, **2022**, 2023)
(Goiás) Vila Nova	2 (2021, 2022)

=== Road to the final ===
Note: In all scores below, the score of the finalist is given first.

(Pará) Paysandu			Round	(Goiás) Vila Nova		
Opponent	Venue	Score		Opponent	Venue	Score
Bye			First round	Bye		
(Acre (state)) Rio Branco	Home	3–0	Round of 16	(Espírito Santo) Rio Branco	Home	1–0
(Amazonas (Brazilian state)) Manaus (won 4–2 on aggregate)	Away	0–1	Quarter-finals	Goiás (won 2–1 on aggregate)	Home	1–0
(Amazonas (Brazilian state)) Manaus (won 4–2 on aggregate)	Home	4–1	Quarter-finals	Goiás (won 2–1 on aggregate)	Away	1–1
(Pará) Remo (tied 1–1 on aggregate, won 4–3 on penalties)	Neutral	0–0	Semi-finals	(Mato Grosso) Cuiabá (tied 4–4 on aggregate, won 4–2 on penalties)	Home	2–0
(Pará) Remo (tied 1–1 on aggregate, won 4–3 on penalties)	Neutral	1–1	Semi-finals	(Mato Grosso) Cuiabá (tied 4–4 on aggregate, won 4–2 on penalties)	Away	2–4

== Format ==
The finals were played on a home-and-away two-legged basis. If tied on aggregate, the penalty shoot-out was used to determine the winner.

== Matches ==
=== First leg ===
22 May 2024
20:00 BRT (UTC−3)

Paysandu (Pará)	6–0	(Goiás) Vila Nova
García 6'; Nicolas 33', 55', 72'; Edílson 45+2'; Edinho 84'	Report

Estádio da Curuzu, Belém
Attendance: 13,052
Referee: Davi de Oliveira Lacerda (Espírito Santo)

**Paysandu**	**Vila Nova**

GK	12	(Brazil) Diogo Silva
DF	2	(Brazil) Edílson
DF	23	(Brazil) Carlão
DF	27	(Brazil) Lucas Maia	(yellow card) 44'
DF	36	(Brazil) Kevyn
MF	8	(Brazil) João Vieira		(substituted off) 59'
MF	28	(Brazil) Leandro Vilela		(substituted off) 67'
MF	14	(Brazil) Juninho		(substituted off) 46'
FW	15	(Venezuela) Esli García		(substituted off) 76'
FW	26	(Brazil) Ruan Ribeiro		(substituted off) 59'
FW	11	(Brazil) Nicolas (c)	(yellow card) 25'
Substitutes:
GK	13	(Brazil) Matheus Nogueira
DF	21	(Brazil) Bryan		(substituted in) 59'
DF	35	(Brazil) Luan Freitas
MF	5	(Brazil) Netinho		(substituted in) 67'
MF	30	(Brazil) Val Soares		(substituted in) 59'
MF	32	(Brazil) Brendon
FW	10	(Brazil) Vinícius Leite		(substituted in) 76'
FW	18	(Brazil) Edinho		(substituted in) 46'
FW	22	(Brazil) Jean Dias
Coach:
(Brazil) Hélio dos Anjos

GK	26	(Brazil) Dênis Júnior
DF	23	(Brazil) Ruan Santos
DF	3	(Colombia) Juan Quintero	(yellow card) 25'
DF	4	(Brazil) Anderson Conceição (c)		(substituted off) 38'
DF	6	(Brazil) Roberto
MF	5	(Brazil) Bruno Matias		(substituted off) 46'
MF	15	(Brazil) João Vitor
MF	8	(Brazil) Fernando Henrique		(substituted off) 62'
MF	20	(Brazil) João Lucas
FW	11	(Brazil) Alesson		(substituted off) 74'
FW	9	(Brazil) Fernandão		(substituted off) 46'
Substitutes:
GK	1	(Brazil) Vitor Hugo
MF	10	(Brazil) Luciano Naninho		(substituted in) 62'
MF	13	(Brazil) Vitor Graziani
MF	18	(Brazil) Estêvão
MF	21	(Brazil) Breno		(substituted in) 46'
FW	19	(Brazil) Henrique Almeida		(substituted in) 46'
FW	22	(Brazil) Apodi		(substituted in) 74'
FW	70	(Brazil) Juan Christian	(yellow card) 80' (yellow-red card) 90+1'	(substituted in) 38'
Coach:
(Brazil) Márcio Fernandes

Assistant referees:
Eduardo Gonçalves da Cruz (Mato Grosso do Sul)
Adílson Gomes de Oliveira (Espírito Santo)
Fourth official:
Rodrigo da Fonseca Silva (Mato Grosso)
Fifth official:
Thânia Lopes da Silva (Pará)
Video assistant referee:
Vitor Carmona Metestaine (São Paulo)
Assistant video assistant referees:
Alisson Sidnei Furtado (Tocantins)
Marcos André Gomes da Penha (Espírito Santo)

=== Second leg ===
29 May 2024
20:00 BRT (UTC−3)

Vila Nova (Goiás)	0–4	(Pará) Paysandu
	Report	Nicolas 3'; João Vieira 39'; Vinícius Leite 71'; Edinho 83'

Estádio Olímpico Pedro Ludovico, Goiânia
Attendance: 426
Referee: Angleison Marcos Vieira Monteiro (Rondônia)

**Vila Nova**	**Paysandu**

GK	1	(Brazil) Vitor Hugo
DF	22	(Brazil) Apodi		(substituted off) 46'
DF	4	(Brazil) Vitor Graziani
DF	3	(Brazil) Léo Gama	(yellow card) 24'
DF	6	(Brazil) Marcos Rondon		(substituted off) 89'
MF	5	(Brazil) Bruno Matias
MF	15	(Brazil) João Vitor
MF	10	(Brazil) Luciano Naninho		(substituted off) 80'
MF	8	(Brazil) João Lucas	(yellow card) 66'	(substituted off) 80'
MF	7	(Brazil) Estêvão		(substituted off) 62'
FW	19	(Brazil) Henrique Almeida (c)
Substitutes:
GK	26	(Brazil) Dênis Júnior
MF	2	(Brazil) Lucas Bispo		(substituted in) 89'
MF	18	(Brazil) Álvaro
MF	20	(Brazil) Carlos Miguel		(substituted in) 80'
MF	23	(Brazil) Breno		(substituted in) 46'
FW	9	(Brazil) Luís Augusto
FW	11	(Brazil) Alesson
FW	17	(Brazil) Gustavo Pajé		(substituted in) 62'
FW	21	(Brazil) Islan		(substituted in) 80'
Interim Coach:
(Brazil) Raphael Miranda

GK	12	(Brazil) Diogo Silva
DF	2	(Brazil) Edílson
DF	4	(Brazil) Wanderson	(yellow card) 65'
DF	27	(Brazil) Lucas Maia	(yellow card) 45+4'
DF	36	(Brazil) Kevyn
MF	8	(Brazil) João Vieira	(yellow card) 15'	(substituted off) 73'
MF	28	(Brazil) Leandro Vilela	(yellow card) 41'	(substituted off) 46'
MF	14	(Brazil) Juninho		(substituted off) 62'
FW	15	(Venezuela) Esli García		(substituted off) 62'
FW	26	(Brazil) Ruan Ribeiro		(substituted off) 46'
FW	11	(Brazil) Nicolas (c)
Substitutes:
GK	13	(Brazil) Matheus Nogueira
DF	16	(Brazil) Michel Macedo
DF	21	(Brazil) Bryan
DF	23	(Brazil) Carlão
MF	5	(Brazil) Netinho		(substituted in) 73'
MF	17	(Brazil) Biel
MF	20	(Brazil) Robinho		(substituted in) 62'
MF	30	(Brazil) Val Soares		(substituted in) 46'
MF	32	(Brazil) Brendon
FW	10	(Brazil) Vinícius Leite		(substituted in) 62'
FW	18	(Brazil) Edinho		(substituted in) 46'
Coach:
(Brazil) Hélio dos Anjos

Assistant referees:
Fabiano da Silva Ramires (Espírito Santo)
Joverton Wesley de Souza Lima (Rondônia)
Fourth official:
Cássia França de Souza (Distrito Federal)
Fifth official:
Jordana Pereira Batista (Goiás)
Video assistant referee:
Rodrigo Batista Raposo (Distrito Federal)
Assistant video assistant referees:
Ciro Chaban Junqueira (Distrito Federal)
Alisson Sidnei Furtado (Tocantins)

== See also ==
- 2025 Copa do Brasil
