= 2024 Copa do Brasil second round =

Brazilian football competition

The 2024 Copa do Brasil second round was the second round of the 2024 Copa do Brasil football competition. It was played on the weeks of 6 and 13 March. A total of 40 teams, qualified from the first round, competed in the second round to qualify for 20 places in the third round of the 2024 Copa do Brasil.

== Format ==
In the second round, each tie was played on a single-legged basis, with matches and hosts determined by the first round draw. If the score was level, the match would go straight to the penalty shoot-out to determine the winners.

== Matches ==
The fixture list was confirmed by CBF on 29 February 2024 following the draw. Times are BRT (UTC–3), as listed by CBF (local times, if different, are in parentheses).

Team 1	Score	Team 2
Sousa	1–0	Petrolina
Botafogo-SP	2–1	Anápolis
São Bernardo	0–2	Corinthians
Sampaio Corrêa	0–0 (5–3 p)	Ferroviário
Fortaleza	0–0 (3–2 p)	Retrô
Ypiranga	2–0	Porto Velho
Portuguesa-RJ	0–0 (3–4 p)	Cuiabá
ABC	1–1 (4–5 p)	Brusque
Maringá	0–1	Amazonas
Villa Nova	0–2	Operário Ferroviário
Caxias	2–2 (5–6 p)	Bahia
Sport	1–1 (5–4 p)	Murici
Vasco da Gama	3–3 (4–1 p)	Água Santa
América de Natal	3–0	São Luiz
Real Brasília	1–3	Atlético Goianiense
CRB	2–0	Athletic
Águia de Marabá	3–0	Capital
Brasiliense	1–1 (1–3 p)	Criciúma
Nova Iguaçu	0–2	Internacional
Juventude	3–1	Paysandu

7 March 2024
20:30

Sousa	1–0	Petrolina
Diego Ceará 18'	Report

Marizão, Sousa
Attendance: 3,090
Referee: Arthur Gomes Rabelo (Espírito Santo)

14 March 2024
21:30

Botafogo-SP	2–1	Anápolis
Alex Sandro 42'; Matheus Costa 45+1'	Report	Matheus Lagoa 33'

Estádio Santa Cruz, Ribeirão Preto
Referee: Murilo Ugolini Klein (Paraná)

14 March 2024
20:00

São Bernardo	0–2	Corinthians
	Report	Yuri Alberto 5' (pen.); Pedro Raul 25'

Estádio Primeiro de Maio, São Bernardo do Campo
Referee: Bráulio da Silva Machado (Santa Catarina)

13 March 2024
21:30

Sampaio Corrêa	0–0	Ferroviário
	Report
Penalties
Bruno Baio (penalty scored); Eloir (penalty scored); Gazão (penalty scored); Pimentinha (penalty scored); Rafael Luiz (penalty scored)	5–3	(penalty scored) Ciel; (penalty scored) Vitinho; (penalty scored) Léo Rafael; (penalty missed) Bryan Gabriel

Castelão, São Luís
Referee: Bruno Mota Correia (Rio de Janeiro)

14 March 2024
21:30

Fortaleza	0–0	Retrô
	Report
Penalties
Calebe (penalty missed); Lucero (penalty missed); Kervin Andrade (penalty scored); Zé Welison (penalty scored); Tinga (penalty scored)	3–2	(penalty missed) Fernandinho; (penalty missed) Renato Henrique; (penalty scored) Edson Lucas; (penalty missed) Luisinho; (penalty scored) Giva

Arena Castelão, Fortaleza
Referee: João Vitor Gobi (São Paulo)

13 March 2024
19:00

Ypiranga	2–0	Porto Velho
Alisson Taddei 35'; Amarildo 40'	Report

Colosso da Lagoa, Erechim
Referee: Fábio Augusto Santos Sá Júnior (Sergipe)

12 March 2024
21:30

Portuguesa-RJ	0–0	Cuiabá
	Report
Penalties
Anderson Rosa (penalty missed); Willian (penalty scored); Rodolfo Filemon (penalty scored); Patrick Carvalho (penalty scored); Lucas Silva (penalty missed)	3–4	(penalty scored) Deyverson; (penalty scored) Fernando Sobral; (penalty scored) Clayson; (penalty scored) Filipe Augusto

Estádio Luso Brasileiro, Rio de Janeiro
Referee: Paulo Cesar Zanovelli da Silva (Minas Gerais)

12 March 2024
21:30

ABC	1–1	Brusque
Wallyson 31'	Report	Alex Ruan 42'
Penalties
Wesley (penalty scored); Romário (penalty scored); Walfrido (penalty scored); Yuri Ferraz (penalty scored); Ruan (penalty missed); Erick Varão (penalty missed)	4–5	(penalty scored) Guilherme Queiróz; (penalty scored) Jhemerson; (penalty scored) Luiz Henrique; (penalty missed) Alex Ruan; (penalty scored) Olávio; (penalty scored) Dionísio

Frasqueirão, Natal
Referee: Davi de Oliveira Lacerda (Espírito Santo)

14 March 2024
21:30

Maringá	0–1	Amazonas
	Report	Diego Torres 66'

Estádio Willie Davids, Maringá
Referee: Matheus Delgado Candançan (São Paulo)

7 March 2024
19:00

Villa Nova	0–2	Operário Ferroviário
	Report	Ronaldo 1'; Maxwell 39'

Estádio Castor Cifuentes, Nova Lima
Attendance: 1,157
Referee: Maguielson Lima Barbosa (Distrito Federal)

12 March 2024
21:30

Caxias	2–2	Bahia
Cauly 19'; Thaciano 39'	Report	Caio Alexandre 4' (o.g.); Robinho 88'
Penalties
Marcelo Ferreira (penalty missed); Robinho (penalty missed); Dudu Mandai (penalty scored); Vitor Feijão (penalty scored); Álvaro (penalty scored); David Lustosa (penalty scored); Pedro Cuiabá (penalty scored); Denílson (penalty missed)	5–6	(penalty scored) Everaldo; (penalty missed) Santiago Arias; (penalty scored) Luciano Juba; (penalty missed) Yago Felipe; (penalty scored) Cauly; (penalty scored) Biel; (penalty scored) Everton Ribeiro; (penalty scored) Víctor Cuesta

Estádio Centenário, Caxias do Sul
Referee: Flavio Rodrigues de Souza (São Paulo)

13 March 2024
19:00

Sport	1–1	Murici
Luciano Castán 18'	Report	Alex Santos 90+4'
Penalties
Gustavo Coutinho (penalty scored); Lucas Lima (penalty scored); Tití Ortiz (penalty scored); Chrystian Barletta (penalty scored); Fabricio Domínguez (penalty scored)	5–4	(penalty scored) Tarcísio; (penalty scored) Rodrigo Mucuri; (penalty scored) Alex Moreira; (penalty scored) Morais; (penalty missed) Juan Palacios

Arena Pernambuco, São Lourenço da Mata
Referee: Jonathan Benkenstein Pinheiro (Rio Grande do Sul)

7 March 2024
20:00

Vasco da Gama	3–3	Água Santa
Galdames 3'; Vegetti 15'; Lucas Piton 90+2'	Report	Neílton 45+2'; Robles 58'; Luan Dias 87'
Penalties
Payet (penalty scored); Lucas Piton (penalty scored); Sforza (penalty scored); Vegetti (penalty scored)	4–1	(penalty missed) Robles; (penalty scored) Alex Silva; (penalty missed) Bruno Mezenga

São Januário, Rio de Janeiro
Referee: Rafael Rodrigo Klein (Rio Grande do Sul)

13 March 2024
21:30

América de Natal	3–0	São Luiz
Wenderson 38'; Matheus Bossa 49'; Gustavo 83'	Report

Arena das Dunas, Natal
Referee: Kleber Ariel Goncalves da Silva (Paraná)

6 March 2024
20:00

Real Brasília	1–3	Atlético Goianiense
Guilherme 1'	Report	Rodríguez 19'; Alix 74'; Shaylon 85'

Bezerrão, Gama
Attendance: 1,223
Referee: André Luiz Skettino Policarpo Bento (Minas Gerais)

12 March 2024
19:00

CRB	2–0	Athletic
Anselmo Ramon 13'; Gegê 52'	Report

Estádio Rei Pelé, Maceió
Referee: Yuri Elino Ferreira da Cruz (Rio de Janeiro)

14 March 2024
20:30

Águia de Marabá	3–0	Capital
Iury Tanque 32'; Braga 51', 89'	Report

Zinho Oliveira, Marabá
Referee: Júlio César Pfleger (Santa Catarina)

14 March 2024
19:00

Brasiliense	1–1	Criciúma
Wallace 53'	Report	Éder 3'
Penalties
Gustavo Lila (penalty missed); Gustavão (penalty missed); Dandan (penalty missed); Wallace Tarta (penalty scored)	1–3	(penalty missed) Fellipe Mateus; (penalty scored) Marcelo Hermes; (penalty scored) Higor Meritão; (penalty scored) Renato Kayzer

Serejão, Brasília
Referee: Wagner do Nascimento Magalhães (Rio de Janeiro)

13 March 2024
20:00

Nova Iguaçu	0–2	Internacional
	Report	Enner Valencia 30', 58'

Mané Garrincha, Brasília
Referee: Luiz Flavio de Oliveira (São Paulo)

13 March 2024
21:30

Juventude	3–1	Paysandu
Gilberto 25', 42'; Lucas 50'	Report	Vinícius Leite 69'

Alfredo Jaconi, Caxias do Sul
Referee: Edina Alves Batista (São Paulo)
