= 2024 Copa do Brasil first round =

Brazilian football competition

The 2024 Copa do Brasil first round was the first round of the 2024 Copa do Brasil football competition. It was played on the weeks of 20 and 27 February. A total of 80 teams competed in the first round to qualify for 40 places in the second round of the 2024 Copa do Brasil.

== Draw ==
On 30 January 2024, CBF held the draw for the first and second rounds of the Copa do Brasil. Teams were seeded into eight groups as per their national ranking. Matches were drawn using group A vs E, B vs F, C vs G, and D vs H; lower-ranked teams host the match.

Group A	Group B	Group C	Group D
Corinthians (6); Fortaleza (9); América Mineiro (10); Internacional (11); Bahia (13); Atlético Goianiense (16); Cruzeiro (17); Cuiabá (19); Coritiba (21); Vasco da Gama (22)	Juventude (23); Sport (24); CRB (26); Criciúma (30); Sampaio Corrêa (33); Tombense (35); Ituano (36); Operário Ferroviário (39); ABC (40); Remo (41)	Botafogo-SP (42); Brusque (43); Paysandu (44); Volta Redonda (48); Ypiranga (49); Confiança (51); Ferroviário (53); Brasiliense (57); América de Natal (58); Aparecidense (61)	Amazonas (66); São Raimundo-RR (67); Jacuipense (68); Tocantinópolis (69); Portuguesa-RJ (72); Retrô (73); Caxias (74); FC Cascavel (75); São Bernardo (76); Nova Iguaçu (78)
Group E	Group F	Group G	Group H
ASA (83); Real Noroeste (84); União Rondonópolis (85); Moto Club (86); Maringá (89); Sousa (90); Fluminense-PI (91); Águia de Marabá (92); Cianorte (93); Marcílio Dias (94)	CEOV (96); Humaitá (98); Trem (98); São Luiz (103); Treze (107); Operário-MS (108); Porto Velho (116); Anápolis (117); Rio Branco-AC (118); Iguatu (122)	Athletic (123); Nova Venécia (129); Maranhão (135); Itabaiana (152); Costa Rica (159); Murici (175); River-PI (179); GAS (195); Villa Nova (204); Ji-Paraná (204)	Real Brasília (221); Água Santa (—); Portuguesa Santista (—); Audax Rio (—); Olaria (—); Itabuna (—); Petrolina (—); Manauara (—); Capital (—); Independente-AP (—)

== Format ==
In the first round, each tie was played on a single-legged basis. The lower-ranked team hosted the match. If a game ends on a draw, the higher-ranked team automatically advances to the second round.

== Matches ==
The fixture list was confirmed by CBF on 30 January 2024 following the draw. Times are BRT (UTC–3), as listed by CBF (local times, if different, are in parentheses).

Team 1	Score	Team 2
Sousa	2–0	Cruzeiro
Petrolina	3–2	FC Cascavel
Anápolis	1–0	Tombense
Nova Venécia	1–2	Botafogo-SP
Cianorte	0–3	Corinthians
Olaria	0–1	São Bernardo
Humaitá	1–1	Sampaio Corrêa
Maranhão	1–2	Ferroviário
Fluminense-PI	0–3	Fortaleza
Manauara	1–2	Retrô
Porto Velho	1–0	Remo
River-PI	1–1	Ypiranga
Real Noroeste	1–4	Cuiabá
Audax Rio	0–0	Portuguesa-RJ
Treze	1–1	ABC
GAS	0–1	Brusque
Maringá	2–0	América Mineiro
Independente-AP	0–1	Amazonas
Operário-MS	0–0	Operário Ferroviário
Villa Nova	1–0	Aparecidense
Moto Club	0–4	Bahia
Portuguesa Santista	0–1	Caxias
Trem	0–4	Sport
Murici	2–1	Confiança
Marcílio Dias	1–3	Vasco da Gama
Água Santa	2–1	Jacuipense
São Luiz	2–1	Ituano
Costa Rica	1–2	América de Natal
União Rondonópolis	1–3	Atlético Goianiense
Real Brasília	2–1	São Raimundo-RR
Rio Branco-AC	0–0	CRB
Athletic	1–0	Volta Redonda
Águia de Marabá	3–2	Coritiba
Capital	2–1	Tocantinópolis
CEOV	0–0	Criciúma
Itabaiana	0–1	Brasiliense
ASA	0–2	Internacional
Itabuna	0–8	Nova Iguaçu
Iguatu	0–0	Juventude
Ji-Paraná	0–0	Paysandu

21 February 2024
19:15

Sousa	2–0	Cruzeiro
Danillo 88', 90+4'	Report

Estádio Antonio Mariz, Sousa
Attendance: 2,930
Referee: Rafael Rodrigo Klein (Rio Grande do Sul)

28 February 2024
19:30

Petrolina	3–2	FC Cascavel
Kiros 42'; Everton Recife 47'; Galego 90+6'	Report	João Marcus 63'; Victor Daniel 77'

Estádio Paulo Coelho, Petrolina
Attendance: 2,379
Referee: Fábio Augusto Santos Sá Júnior (Sergipe)

21 February 2024
19:30

Anápolis	1–0	Tombense
Stefano 81'	Report

Estádio Jonas Duarte, Anápolis
Attendance: 3,509
Referee: Bruno Mota Correia (Rio de Janeiro)

20 February 2024
20:00

Nova Venécia	1–2	Botafogo-SP
Diego Fernandes 13'	Report	Alex Sandro 59', 68'

Estádio José Olímpio da Rocha, Águia Branca
Attendance: 615
Referee: Caio Max Augusto Vieira (Rio Grande do Norte)

22 February 2024
20:00

Cianorte	0–3	Corinthians
	Report	Wesley 2'; Romero 31', 63'

Estádio Willie Davids, Maringá
Attendance: 11,574
Referee: Paulo Cesar Zanovelli da Silva (Minas Gerais)

28 February 2024
15:30

Olaria	0–1	São Bernardo
	Report	Kayke 90+2'

Estádio da Rua Bariri, Olaria
Attendance: 999
Referee: Ivan da Silva Guimarães Júnior (Amazonas)

28 February 2024
21:30
(19:30 UTC−5)

Humaitá	1–1	Sampaio Corrêa
André Lima 62'	Report	Bruno Baio 51'

Arena da Floresta, Rio Branco
Attendance: 1,187
Referee: Paulo Henrique de Melo Salmazio (Mato Grosso)

28 February 2024
19:30

Maranhão	1–2	Ferroviário
Ioro 12'	Report	Gabryel Martins 14'; Geninho 73'

Estádio Nhozinho Santos, São Luís
Attendance: 434
Referee: Antônio Dib Moraes de Sousa (Piauí)

4 March 2024
16:00

Fluminense-PI	0–3	Fortaleza
	Report	Kuscevic 47'; Lucero 73'; Kervin Andrade 90+5'

Estádio Lindolfo Monteiro, Teresina
Attendance: 942
Referee: Luiz Flávio de Oliveira (São Paulo)

21 February 2024
16:30
(15:30 UTC−4)

Manauara	1–2	Retrô
Matheus Sacramento 31'	Report	Mascote 44'; Giva 62'

Estádio Municipal Carlos Zamith, Manaus
Attendance: 188
Referee: Sávio Pereira Sampaio (Distrito Federal)

20 February 2024
16:30
(15:30 UTC−4)

Porto Velho	1–0	Remo
Fagner 8'	Report

Aluizão, Porto Velho
Attendance: 2,294
Referee: Maguielson Lima Barbosa (Distrito Federal)

21 February 2024
16:00

River-PI	1–1	Ypiranga
Rodrigo Fumaça 46'	Report	Fernando Fonseca 87'

Albertão, Teresina
Attendance: 873
Referee: Paulo Belence Alves dos Prazeres Filho (Pernambuco)

22 February 2024
17:30

Real Noroeste	1–4	Cuiabá
Lausen 87'	Report	Isidro Pitta 2'; Marllon 11'; Derik Lacerda 24', 64'

Estádio José Olímpio da Rocha, Águia Branca
Attendance: 695
Referee: Wagner do Nascimento Magalhães (Rio de Janeiro)

21 February 2024
19:30

Audax Rio	0–0	Portuguesa-RJ
	Report

Estádio Eucyr Resende, Saquarema
Attendance: 194
Referee: João Vitor Gobi (São Paulo)

20 February 2024
19:30

Treze	1–1	ABC
Roberto 5'	Report	Wallyson 50'

Amigão, Campina Grande
Attendance: 6,549
Referee: Jefferson Ferreira de Moraes (Goiás)

28 February 2024
20:30
(19:30 UTC−4)

GAS	0–1	Brusque
	Report	Paulinho Moccelin 1'

Estádio Canarinho, Boa Vista
Attendance: 1,896
Referee: José Souza Mourão (Maranhão)

28 February 2024
19:15

Maringá	2–0	América Mineiro
Gustavo 90+9'; Mirandinha 90+11'	Report

Estádio Willie Davids, Maringá
Attendance: 5,899
Referee: Marcelo de Lima Henrique (Ceará)

21 February 2024
20:30

Independente-AP	0–1	Amazonas
	Report	Rubens 78'

Zerão, Macapá
Attendance: 1,994
Referee: Denis da Silva Ribeiro Serafim (Alagoas)

28 February 2024
21:30
(20:30 UTC−4)

Operário-MS	0–0	Operário Ferroviário
	Report

Morenão, Campo Grande
Attendance: 2,691
Referee: Dyorgines José Padovani de Andrade (Espírito Santo)

28 February 2024
19:30

Villa Nova	1–0	Aparecidense
Guilherme Santos 83'	Report

Estádio Castor Cifuentes, Nova Lima
Attendance: 1,062
Referee: Rafael Martins Diniz (Distrito Federal)

21 February 2024
20:00

Moto Club	0–4	Bahia
	Report	Óscar Estupiñán 41'; Jean Lucas 51'; Cauly 55'; Rafael Ratão 90+2'

Estádio Nhozinho Santos, São Luís
Attendance: 1,388
Referee: Marcelo de Lima Henrique (Rio de Janeiro)

28 February 2024
20:30

Portuguesa Santista	0–1	Caxias
	Report	Gabriel Silva 40'

Estádio Ulrico Mursa, Santos
Attendance: 4,689
Referee: Gustavo Ervino Bauermann (Santa Catarina)

28 February 2024
21:30

Trem	0–4	Sport
	Report	Romarinho 4'; Alan Ruiz 33'; Gustavo Coutinho 47'; Chrystian Barletta 65'

Zerão, Macapá
Attendance: 1,938
Referee: Felipe Fernandes de Lima (Minas Gerais)

28 February 2024
19:30

Murici	2–1	Confiança
Mazinho 80'; Ciel 85'	Report	Lucas 54'

Estádio José Gomes da Costa, Murici
Attendance: 1,044
Referee: Kleber Ariel Goncalves da Silva (Paraná)

27 February 2024
21:30

Marcílio Dias	1–3	Vasco da Gama
Zé Eduardo 15'	Report	Pablo Vegetti 10'; Adson 40'; David 74'

Estádio Hercílio Luz, Itajaí
Attendance: 6,886
Referee: Anderson Daronco (Rio Grande do Sul)

28 February 2024
20:30

Água Santa	2–1	Jacuipense
Luan Dias 48', 78'	Report	Pablo 43'

Arena Inamar, Diadema
Attendance: 1,930
Referee: Alisson Sidnei Furtado (Tocantins)

21 February 2024
20:30

São Luiz	2–1	Ituano
Gabriel Davis 12'; Vinicius 82'	Report	Zé Carlos 13'

Estádio 19 de Outubro, Ijuí
Attendance: 2,239
Referee: Yuri Elino Ferreira da Cruz (Rio de Janeiro)

21 February 2024
20:30
(19:30 UTC−4)

Costa Rica	1–2	América de Natal
Marquinho 54'	Report	Alan 33'; Giovani 90+6'

Laertão, Costa Rica
Attendance: 945
Referee: Marielson Alves Silva (Bahia)

21 February 2024
21:30

União Rondonópolis	1–3	Atlético Goianiense
Maranhão 54'	Report	Adriano Martins 41'; Emiliano Rodríguez 56', 61'

Estádio Engenheiro Luthero Lopes, Rondonópolis
Attendance: 5,841
Referee: Luiz Flavio de Oliveira (São Paulo)

21 February 2024
15:30

Real Brasília	2–1	São Raimundo-RR
Felipe 31'; Michel 46'	Report	Eduardo 52'

Defelê, Brasília
Attendance: 161
Referee: Afro Rocha de Carvalho Filho (Paraíba)

21 February 2024
21:30
(19:30 UTC−5)

Rio Branco-AC	0–0	CRB
	Report

Arena da Floresta, Rio Branco
Attendance: 2,596
Referee: Jonathan Benkenstein Pinheiro (Rio Grande do Sul)

27 February 2024
19:15

Athletic	1–0	Volta Redonda
Robert 22'	Report

Estádio Joaquim Portugal, São João del-Rei
Attendance: 2,891
Referee: Edina Alves Batista (São Paulo)

22 February 2024
20:00

Águia de Marabá	3–2	Coritiba
Braga 28'; Iury Tanque 50' (pen.); Júnior Dindê 69'	Report	Matheus Frizzo 8'; Bruno Melo 90+5'

Estádio Municipal Zinho de Oliveira, Marabá
Attendance: 2,040
Referee: Matheus Delgado Candançan (São Paulo)

21 February 2024
20:30

Capital	2–1	Tocantinópolis
Giancarlo 33'; Arthurzinho 37'	Report	Pedro Igor 63'

Estádio Nilton Santos, Palmas
Attendance: 1,792
Referee: André Luiz Policarpo Bento (Minas Gerais)

28 February 2024
21:30
(20:30 UTC−4)

CEOV	0–0	Criciúma
	Report

Arena Pantanal, Cuiabá
Attendance: 940
Referee: Flávio Rodrigues de Souza (São Paulo)

21 February 2024
19:30

Itabaiana	0–1	Brasiliense
	Report	Tobinha 15'

Barretão, Lagarto
Attendance: 1,587
Referee: José Mendonça da Silva Júnior (Paraná)

28 February 2024
20:00

ASA	0–2	Internacional
	Report	Lucas Alario 5'; Vitão 54'

Estádio Municipal Coaracy da Mata Fonseca, Arapiraca
Attendance: 6,701
Referee: Bráulio da Silva Machado (Santa Catarina)

28 February 2024
19:30

Itabuna	0–8	Nova Iguaçu
	Report	Xandinho 38', 85'; Bill 41', 55'; Yago 45', 59'; Carlinhos 58'; Albert 79'

Estádio Mário Pessoa, Ilhéus
Attendance: 736
Referee: Murilo Ugolini Klein (Paraná)

27 February 2024
20:00

Iguatu	0–0	Juventude
	Report

Morenão, Iguatu
Attendance: 2,617
Referee: Rodrigo José Pereira de Lima (Pernambuco)

29 February 2024
21:30
(20:30 UTC−4)

Ji-Paraná	0–0	Paysandu
	Report

Biancão, Ji-Paraná
Attendance: 3,828
Referee: Alex Gomes Stefano (Rio de Janeiro)
