= Bruno Matias (footballer, born 1999) =

Brazilian footballer

Personal information
- Full name: Bruno Matias dos Santos
- Date of birth: 24 February 1999 (age 27)
- Place of birth: São Paulo, Brazil
- Height: 1.72 m (5 ft 8 in)
- Position: Midfielder

Team information
- Current team: Chapecoense
- Number: 16

Youth career
- 2013–2014: Noroeste
- 2015–2018: Novorizontino

Senior career*
| Years | Team | Apps | (Gls) |
| 2018–2021 | Novorizontino | 5 | (0) |
| 2018–2019 | → Figueirense (loan) | 2 | (0) |
| 2020–2021 | → Brasil de Pelotas (loan) | 64 | (1) |
| 2022 | Sport Recife | 22 | (1) |
| 2023 | CSA | 18 | (0) |
| 2023 | Tombense | 12 | (0) |
| 2024 | Vila Nova | 15 | (1) |
| 2024 | Mirassol | 11 | (0) |
| 2025– | Chapecoense | 39 | (1) |
- * Club domestic league appearances and goals as of 16:35, 5 January 2026 (UTC)

Bruno Matias dos Santos (born 24 February 1999), known as Bruno Matias, is a Brazilian footballer who plays as a midfielder for Chapecoense.

== Career ==
Born in São Paulo, Bruno Matias played for Noroeste and Novorizontino as a youth. After making his first team debut with the latter in 2018, he moved on loan to Figueirense shortly after.

In 2020, Bruno Matias moved to Brasil de Pelotas also in a temporary deal. On 31 January 2022, he signed a one-year deal with Sport Recife.

On 17 December 2022, after being sparingly used, Bruno Matias joined CSA. He left the following August, and subsequently moved to Tombense.

On 6 December 2023, Bruno Matias agreed to a deal with Vila Nova. He was announced at Mirassol the following 28 June, and featured rarely as the club achieved promotion to the Série A for the first time ever.

On 2 December 2024, Chapecoense announced the signing of Bruno Matias on a one-year contract. A regular starter, he suffered a knee injury in September 2025, being sidelined for the remainder of the year.

== Career statistics ==
As of 5 January 2026

| Club | Season | League | | | State League | | Cup | | Continental | | Other | | Total | |
| Club | Season | Division | Apps | Goals | Apps | Goals | Apps | Goals | Apps | Goals | Apps | Goals | Apps | Goals |
|---|---|---|---|---|---|---|---|---|---|---|---|---|---|---|
| Novorizontino | 2018 | Série D | 2 | 0 | 1 | 0 | — | | — | | — | | 3 | 0 |
| Novorizontino | 2020 | Série D | — | | 2 | 0 | — | | — | | — | | 2 | 0 |
| Novorizontino | Total | | 2 | 0 | 3 | 0 | — | | — | | — | | 5 | 0 |
| Figueirense (loan) | 2018 | Série B | 0 | 0 | — | | — | | — | | 1 (Note: Appearance(s) in Copa Santa Catarina) | 0 | 1 | 0 |
| Figueirense (loan) | 2019 | Série B | 0 | 0 | 2 | 0 | 0 | 0 | — | | 14 | 0 | 16 | 0 |
| Figueirense (loan) | Total | | 0 | 0 | 2 | 0 | 0 | 0 | — | | 15 | 0 | 17 | 0 |
| Brasil de Pelotas (loan) | 2020 | Série B | 30 | 1 | — | | 1 | 0 | — | | — | | 31 | 1 |
| Brasil de Pelotas (loan) | 2021 | Série B | 25 | 0 | 9 | 0 | — | | — | | — | | 34 | 0 |
| Brasil de Pelotas (loan) | Total | | 55 | 1 | 9 | 0 | 1 | 0 | — | | — | | 65 | 1 |
| Sport Recife | 2022 | Série B | 18 | 0 | 4 | 1 | 1 | 0 | — | | 5 (Note: Appearance(s) in Copa do Nordeste) | 0 | 28 | 1 |
| CSA | 2023 | Série C | 11 | 0 | 7 | 0 | 4 | 0 | — | | 11 (Note: Ten appearances in Copa do Nordeste, one appearance in Copa do Nordeste) | 0 | 33 | 0 |
| Tombense | 2023 | Série B | 12 | 0 | — | | — | | — | | — | | 12 | 0 |
| Vila Nova | 2024 | Série B | 2 | 0 | 13 | 1 | — | | — | | 7 (Note: Appearance(s) in Copa Verde) | 1 | 22 | 2 |
| Mirassol | 2024 | Série B | 11 | 0 | — | | — | | — | | 5 (Note: Appearance(s) in Copa Paulista) | 0 | 16 | 0 |
| Chapecoense | 2025 | Série B | 25 | 0 | 14 | 1 | — | | — | | — | | 39 | 1 |
| Chapecoense | 2026 | Série A | 0 | 0 | 0 | 0 | 0 | 0 | — | | — | | 0 | 0 |
| Chapecoense | Total | | 25 | 0 | 14 | 1 | 0 | 0 | — | | — | | 39 | 1 |
| Career total | | | 125 | 1 | 52 | 3 | 6 | 0 | 0 | 0 | 43 | 1 | 226 | 5 |
