= 2024 Copa do Brasil =

Tournament details
- Country: Brazil
- Dates: 20 February – 10 November
- Teams: 92

Final positions
- Champions: Flamengo (5th title)
- Runners-up: Atlético Mineiro
- 2025 Copa Libertadores: Flamengo

Tournament statistics
- Matches played: 122
- Goals scored: 263 (2.16 per match)
- Top goal scorer: Pablo Vegetti (7 goals)

Awards
- Best player: Giorgian de Arrascaeta
- Best goalkeeper: Agustín Rossi (footballer)

The 2024 Copa do Brasil (officially the Copa Betano do Brasil 2024 for sponsorship reasons) was the 36th edition of Brazil's domestic cup, the Copa do Brasil. It was being held from 20 February to 10 November 2024. São Paulo were the defending champions but they were eliminated in the quarter-finals.

Unlike previous editions, this edition did not automatically grant berths based on the national club ranking; instead, of the 92 available berths, 80 were distributed between the state leagues, with the remaining 12 being allocated to the teams qualified for the Copa Libertadores, the champions of regional cups Copa Verde and Copa do Nordeste, the champion of the second division Série B, and any remaining berths going to non-qualified clubs in Série A.

In their third consecutive final, Flamengo defeated Atlético Mineiro to win their fifth title. As champions, Flamengo qualified for the 2025 Copa Libertadores group stage and the 2025 Supercopa do Brasil.

== Qualified teams ==
Each state league received a number of berths based on their state ranking. The states chose how to distribute those berths between league placements and state cup champions. Teams in bold enter the competition in the third round.

Association	Team	Qualification method
Acre; 2 berths	Rio Branco-AC	2023 Campeonato Acreano champions
Acre; 2 berths	Humaitá	2023 Campeonato Acreano runners-up
Alagoas; 3 berths	CRB	2023 Campeonato Alagoano champions
Alagoas; 3 berths	ASA	2023 Campeonato Alagoano runners-up
Alagoas; 3 berths	Murici	2023 Campeonato Alagoano play-off winners
Amapá; 2 berths	Trem	2023 Campeonato Amapaense champions
Amapá; 2 berths	Independente-AP	2023 Campeonato Amapaense runners-up
Amazonas; 2 berths	Amazonas	2023 Campeonato Amazonense champions
Amazonas; 2 berths	Manauara	2023 Campeonato Amazonense runners-up
Bahia; 3 + 1 berths	**Vitória**	**2023 Série B champions**
Bahia; 3 + 1 berths	Bahia	2023 Campeonato Baiano champions
Bahia; 3 + 1 berths	Jacuipense	2023 Campeonato Baiano runners-up
Bahia; 3 + 1 berths	Itabuna	2023 Campeonato Baiano 3rd place
Ceará; 3 + 1 berths	**Ceará**	**2023 Copa do Nordeste champions**
Ceará; 3 + 1 berths	Fortaleza	2023 Campeonato Cearense champions
Ceará; 3 + 1 berths	Iguatu	2023 Campeonato Cearense runners-up
Ceará; 3 + 1 berths	Ferroviário	2023 Copa Fares Lopes champions
Distrito Federal; 2 berths	Real Brasília	2023 Campeonato Brasiliense champions
Distrito Federal; 2 berths	Brasiliense	2023 Campeonato Brasiliense runners-up
Espírito Santo; 2 berths	Real Noroeste	2023 Campeonato Capixaba champions
Espírito Santo; 2 berths	Nova Venécia	2023 Campeonato Capixaba runners-up
Goiás; 3 + 1 berths	**Goiás**	**2023 Copa Verde champions**
Goiás; 3 + 1 berths	Atlético Goianiense	2023 Campeonato Goiano champions
Goiás; 3 + 1 berths	Aparecidense	2023 Campeonato Goiano 3rd place
Goiás; 3 + 1 berths	Anápolis	2023 Campeonato Goiano 4th place
Maranhão; 3 berths	Maranhão	2023 Campeonato Maranhense champions
Maranhão; 3 berths	Moto Club	2023 Campeonato Maranhense runners-up
Maranhão; 3 berths	Sampaio Corrêa	2023 Campeonato Maranhense 3rd place
Mato Grosso; 3 berths	Cuiabá	2023 Campeonato Mato-Grossense champions
Mato Grosso; 3 berths	União Rondonópolis	2023 Campeonato Mato-Grossense runners-up
Mato Grosso; 3 berths	CEOV	2023 Copa FMF 3rd place
Mato Grosso do Sul; 2 berths	Costa Rica	2023 Campeonato Sul-Mato-Grossense champions
Mato Grosso do Sul; 2 berths	Operário-MS	2023 Campeonato Sul-Mato-Grossense runners-up
Minas Gerais; 5 + 1 berths	**Atlético Mineiro**	**2023 Série A 3rd place**
Minas Gerais; 5 + 1 berths	América Mineiro	2023 Campeonato Mineiro runners-up
Minas Gerais; 5 + 1 berths	Athletic	2023 Campeonato Mineiro 3rd place
Minas Gerais; 5 + 1 berths	Cruzeiro	2023 Campeonato Mineiro 4th place
Minas Gerais; 5 + 1 berths	Villa Nova	2023 Campeonato Mineiro 5th place
Minas Gerais; 5 + 1 berths	Tombense	2023 Troféu Inconfidência champions
Pará; 3 berths	Águia de Marabá	2023 Campeonato Paraense champions
Pará; 3 berths	Remo	2023 Campeonato Paraense runners-up
Pará; 3 berths	Paysandu	2023 Campeonato Paraense 3rd place
Paraíba; 2 berths	Treze	2023 Campeonato Paraibano champions
Paraíba; 2 berths	Sousa	2023 Campeonato Paraibano runners-up
Paraná; 5 + 1 berths	**Athletico Paranaense**	**2023 Série A 8th place**
Paraná; 5 + 1 berths	FC Cascavel	2023 Campeonato Paranaense runners-up
Paraná; 5 + 1 berths	Operário Ferroviário	2023 Campeonato Paranaense 3rd place
Paraná; 5 + 1 berths	Maringá	2023 Campeonato Paranaense 4th place
Paraná; 5 + 1 berths	Coritiba	2023 Campeonato Paranaense 5th place
Paraná; 5 + 1 berths	Cianorte	2023 Campeonato Paranaense 6th place
Pernambuco; 3 berths	Sport	2023 Campeonato Pernambucano champions
Pernambuco; 3 berths	Retrô	2023 Campeonato Pernambucano runners-up
Pernambuco; 3 berths	Petrolina	2023 Campeonato Pernambucano 3rd place
Piauí; 2 berths	River-PI	2023 Campeonato Piauiense champions
Piauí; 2 berths	Fluminense-PI	2023 Campeonato Piauiense runners-up
Rio de Janeiro; 6 + 2 + 1 berths	**Fluminense**	**2023 Copa Libertadores champions**
Rio de Janeiro; 6 + 2 + 1 berths	**Flamengo**	**2023 Série A 4th place**
Rio de Janeiro; 6 + 2 + 1 berths	**Botafogo**	**2023 Série A 5th place**
Rio de Janeiro; 6 + 2 + 1 berths	Vasco da Gama	2023 Campeonato Carioca 3rd place
Rio de Janeiro; 6 + 2 + 1 berths	Volta Redonda	2023 Campeonato Carioca 4th place
Rio de Janeiro; 6 + 2 + 1 berths	Audax Rio	2023 Campeonato Carioca 6th place
Rio de Janeiro; 6 + 2 + 1 berths	Nova Iguaçu	2023 Campeonato Carioca 7th place
Rio de Janeiro; 6 + 2 + 1 berths	Portuguesa-RJ	2023 Campeonato Carioca 8th place
Rio de Janeiro; 6 + 2 + 1 berths	Olaria	2023 Copa Rio runners-up
Rio Grande do Norte; 2 berths	América de Natal	2023 Campeonato Potiguar champions
Rio Grande do Norte; 2 berths	ABC	2023 Campeonato Potiguar runners-up
Rio Grande do Sul; 5 + 1 berths	**Grêmio**	**2023 Série A runners-up**
Rio Grande do Sul; 5 + 1 berths	Caxias	2023 Campeonato Gaúcho runners-up
Rio Grande do Sul; 5 + 1 berths	Internacional	2023 Campeonato Gaúcho 3rd place
Rio Grande do Sul; 5 + 1 berths	Ypiranga	2023 Campeonato Gaúcho 4th place
Rio Grande do Sul; 5 + 1 berths	Juventude	2023 Campeonato Gaúcho 5th place
Rio Grande do Sul; 5 + 1 berths	São Luiz	2023 Copa FGF champions
Rondônia; 2 berths	Porto Velho	2023 Campeonato Rondoniense champions
Rondônia; 2 berths	Ji-Paraná	2023 Campeonato Rondoniense runners-up
Roraima; 2 berths	São Raimundo-RR	2023 Campeonato Roraimense champions
Roraima; 2 berths	GAS	2023 Campeonato Roraimense runners-up
Santa Catarina; 3 berths	Criciúma	2023 Campeonato Catarinense champions
Santa Catarina; 3 berths	Brusque	2023 Campeonato Catarinense runners-up
Santa Catarina; 3 berths	Marcílio Dias	2023 Copa Santa Catarina champions
São Paulo; 6 + 2 + 1 berths	**São Paulo**	**2023 Copa do Brasil champions**
São Paulo; 6 + 2 + 1 berths	**Palmeiras**	**2023 Série A champions**
São Paulo; 6 + 2 + 1 berths	**Red Bull Bragantino**	**2023 Série A 6th place**
São Paulo; 6 + 2 + 1 berths	Água Santa	2023 Campeonato Paulista runners-up
São Paulo; 6 + 2 + 1 berths	Ituano	2023 Campeonato Paulista 3rd place
São Paulo; 6 + 2 + 1 berths	Corinthians	2023 Campeonato Paulista 7th place
São Paulo; 6 + 2 + 1 berths	Botafogo-SP	2023 Campeonato Paulista 8th place
São Paulo; 6 + 2 + 1 berths	São Bernardo	2023 Taça Independência champions
São Paulo; 6 + 2 + 1 berths	Portuguesa Santista	2023 Copa Paulista champions
Sergipe; 2 berths	Itabaiana	2023 Campeonato Sergipano champions
Sergipe; 2 berths	Confiança	2023 Campeonato Sergipano runners-up
Tocantins; 2 berths	Tocantinópolis	2023 Campeonato Tocantinense champions
Tocantins; 2 berths	Capital	2023 Campeonato Tocantinense runners-up

== Schedule ==
On 31 October 2023, CBF published the 2024 Copa do Brasil schedule:

Single-legged rounds
Stage	Week 1	Week 2
First round	21 February	28 February
Second round	6 March	13 March

Two-legged rounds
Stage	First leg	Second leg
Third round	1 May	22 May
Round of 16	31 July	7 August
Quarter-finals	28 August	11 September
Semi-finals	2 October	16 October
Finals	3 November	10 November

== Draw ==
On 30 January 2024, CBF held the draw for the first and second rounds of the Copa do Brasil. Teams were seeded into eight groups as per their national ranking. Matches were drawn using group A vs E, B vs F, C vs G, and D vs H; lower-ranked teams host the match.

Group A	Group B	Group C	Group D
Corinthians (6); Fortaleza (9); América Mineiro (10); Internacional (11); Bahia (13); Atlético Goianiense (16); Cruzeiro (17); Cuiabá (19); Coritiba (21); Vasco da Gama (22)	Juventude (23); Sport (24); CRB (26); Criciúma (30); Sampaio Corrêa (33); Tombense (35); Ituano (36); Operário Ferroviário (39); ABC (40); Remo (41)	Botafogo-SP (42); Brusque (43); Paysandu (44); Volta Redonda (48); Ypiranga (49); Confiança (51); Ferroviário (53); Brasiliense (57); América de Natal (58); Aparecidense (61)	Amazonas (66); São Raimundo-RR (67); Jacuipense (68); Tocantinópolis (69); Portuguesa-RJ (72); Retrô (73); Caxias (74); FC Cascavel (75); São Bernardo (76); Nova Iguaçu (78)
Group E	Group F	Group G	Group H
ASA (83); Real Noroeste (84); União Rondonópolis (85); Moto Club (86); Maringá (89); Sousa (90); Fluminense-PI (91); Águia de Marabá (92); Cianorte (93); Marcílio Dias (94)	CEOV (96); Humaitá (98); Trem (98); São Luiz (103); Treze (107); Operário-MS (108); Porto Velho (116); Anápolis (117); Rio Branco-AC (118); Iguatu (122)	Athletic (123); Nova Venécia (129); Maranhão (135); Itabaiana (152); Costa Rica (159); Murici (175); River-PI (179); GAS (195); Villa Nova (204); Ji-Paraná (204)	Real Brasília (221); Água Santa (—); Portuguesa Santista (—); Audax Rio (—); Olaria (—); Itabuna (—); Petrolina (—); Manauara (—); Capital (—); Independente-AP (—)

== First round ==
In the first round, each tie was played on a single-legged basis. The lower-ranked team hosted the match. If a game ends on a draw, the higher-ranked team automatically advances to the second round.

Team 1	Score	Team 2
Sousa	2–0	Cruzeiro
Petrolina	3–2	FC Cascavel
Anápolis	1–0	Tombense
Nova Venécia	1–2	Botafogo-SP
Cianorte	0–3	Corinthians
Olaria	0–1	São Bernardo
Humaitá	1–1	Sampaio Corrêa
Maranhão	1–2	Ferroviário
Fluminense-PI	0–3	Fortaleza
Manauara	1–2	Retrô
Porto Velho	1–0	Remo
River-PI	1–1	Ypiranga
Real Noroeste	1–4	Cuiabá
Audax Rio	0–0	Portuguesa-RJ
Treze	1–1	ABC
GAS	0–1	Brusque
Maringá	2–0	América Mineiro
Independente-AP	0–1	Amazonas
Operário-MS	0–0	Operário Ferroviário
Villa Nova	1–0	Aparecidense
Moto Club	0–4	Bahia
Portuguesa Santista	0–1	Caxias
Trem	0–4	Sport
Murici	2–1	Confiança
Marcílio Dias	1–3	Vasco da Gama
Água Santa	2–1	Jacuipense
São Luiz	2–1	Ituano
Costa Rica	1–2	América de Natal
União Rondonópolis	1–3	Atlético Goianiense
Real Brasília	2–1	São Raimundo-RR
Rio Branco-AC	0–0	CRB
Athletic	1–0	Volta Redonda
Águia de Marabá	3–2	Coritiba
Capital	2–1	Tocantinópolis
CEOV	0–0	Criciúma
Itabaiana	0–1	Brasiliense
ASA	0–2	Internacional
Itabuna	0–8	Nova Iguaçu
Iguatu	0–0	Juventude
Ji-Paraná	0–0	Paysandu

== Second round ==
In the second round, each tie was played on a single-legged basis, with matches and hosts determined by the first round draw. If the score was level, the match would go straight to the penalty shoot-out to determine the winners.

Team 1	Score	Team 2
Sousa	1–0	Petrolina
Botafogo-SP	2–1	Anápolis
São Bernardo	0–2	Corinthians
Sampaio Corrêa	0–0 (5–3 p)	Ferroviário
Fortaleza	0–0 (3–2 p)	Retrô
Ypiranga	2–0	Porto Velho
Portuguesa-RJ	0–0 (3–4 p)	Cuiabá
ABC	1–1 (4–5 p)	Brusque
Maringá	0–1	Amazonas
Villa Nova	0–2	Operário Ferroviário
Caxias	2–2 (5–6 p)	Bahia
Sport	1–1 (5–4 p)	Murici
Vasco da Gama	3–3 (4–1 p)	Água Santa
América de Natal	3–0	São Luiz
Real Brasília	1–3	Atlético Goianiense
CRB	2–0	Athletic
Águia de Marabá	3–0	Capital
Brasiliense	1–1 (1–3 p)	Criciúma
Nova Iguaçu	0–2	Internacional
Juventude	3–1	Paysandu

== Third round ==
The draw for the third round was held on 17 April at the CBF headquarters in Rio de Janeiro. The 32 teams, qualified from the previous round, were placed into two pots, seeded by their national ranking, and then drawn into 16 ties. A second draw determined the home and away teams for each leg. Each team's CBF ranking is shown in parentheses.

Pot A	Pot B
Flamengo (1); Palmeiras (2); São Paulo (3); Athletico Paranaense (4); Atlético Mineiro (5); Corinthians (6); Fluminense (7); Fortaleza (8); Grêmio (9); Internacional (11); Bahia (13); Botafogo (14); Red Bull Bragantino (15); Atlético Goianiense (16); Ceará (18); Cuiabá (19)	Goiás (20); Vasco da Gama (22); Juventude (23); Sport (24); CRB (26); Vitória (28); Criciúma (30); Sampaio Corrêa (33); Operário Ferroviário (35); Botafogo-SP (42); Brusque (43); Ypiranga (49); América de Natal (58); Amazonas (66); Sousa (90); Águia de Marabá (92)

In the third round, each tie was played on a home-and-away two-legged basis. If the aggregate score was level, the second-leg match would go straight to a penalty shoot-out to determine the winners.

Team 1	Agg.	Team 2	1st leg	2nd leg
Bahia	3–0	Criciúma	1–0	2–0
Operário Ferroviário	1–3	Grêmio	0–0	1–3
Atlético Mineiro	2–1	Sport	2–0	0–1
Sampaio Corrêa	0–4	Fluminense	0–2	0–2
Brusque	2–5	Atlético Goianiense	0–1	2–4
Sousa	1–4	Red Bull Bragantino	1–1	0–3
Ypiranga	2–4	Athletico Paranaense	2–1	0–3
Fortaleza	3–3 (4–5 p)	Vasco da Gama	0–0	3–3
América de Natal	2–4	Corinthians	1–2	1–2
Flamengo	2–0	Amazonas	1–0	1–0
Internacional	2–3	Juventude	1–2	1–1
Botafogo	3–1	Vitória	1–0	2–1
Águia de Marabá	1–5	São Paulo	1–3	0–2
CRB	2–0	Ceará	1–0	1–0
Goiás	1–1 (3–1 p)	Cuiabá	1–0	0–1
Palmeiras	2–1	Botafogo-SP	2–1	0–0

== Final rounds ==
=== Bracket ===
Round of 16
(Rio de Janeiro (state)) Botafogo	1	0	1
Bahia	1	1	2
(Rio de Janeiro (state)) Flamengo	2	0	2
(São Paulo (state)) Palmeiras	0	1	1
(Rio Grande do Sul) Juventude	3	2	5
(Rio de Janeiro (state)) Fluminense	2	2	4
(São Paulo (state)) Corinthians (p)	0	0	0 (3)
(Rio Grande do Sul) Grêmio	0	0	0 (1)
(São Paulo (state)) São Paulo	2	0	2
Goiás	0	0	0
(Alagoas) CRB	2	0	2
(Minas Gerais) Atlético Mineiro	2	3	5
(Goiás) Atlético Goianiense	1	0	1
(Rio de Janeiro (state)) Vasco da Gama	1	1	2
(Paraná (state)) Athletico Paranaense	2	3	5
(São Paulo (state)) Red Bull Bragantino	0	2	2

Quarter-finals
Bahia	0	0	0
(Rio de Janeiro (state)) Flamengo	1	1	2
(Rio Grande do Sul) Juventude	2	1	3
(São Paulo (state)) Corinthians	1	3	4
(São Paulo (state)) São Paulo	0	0	0
(Minas Gerais) Atlético Mineiro	1	0	1
(Rio de Janeiro (state)) Vasco da Gama (p)	2	1	3 (5)
(Paraná (state)) Athletico Paranaense	1	2	3 (4)

Semi-finals
(Rio de Janeiro (state)) Flamengo	1	0	1
(São Paulo (state)) Corinthians	0	0	0
(Minas Gerais) Atlético Mineiro	2	1	3
(Rio de Janeiro (state)) Vasco da Gama	1	1	2

Finals
(Rio de Janeiro (state)) Flamengo	3	1	4
(Minas Gerais) Atlético Mineiro	1	0	1

=== Round of 16 ===
The draw for the round of 16 was held on 18 July at the CBF headquarters in Rio de Janeiro.

Team 1	Agg.	Team 2	1st leg	2nd leg
Flamengo	2–1	Palmeiras	2–0	0–1
Atlético Goianiense	1–2	Vasco da Gama	1–1	0–1
Athletico Paranaense	5–2	Red Bull Bragantino	2–0	3–2
São Paulo	2–0	Goiás	2–0	0–0
CRB	2–5	Atlético Mineiro	2–2	0–3
Botafogo	1–2	Bahia	1–1	0–1
Corinthians	0–0 (3–1 p)	Grêmio	0–0	0–0
Juventude	5–4	Fluminense	3–2	2–2

=== Quarter-finals ===
The draw for the quarter-finals was held on 20 August at the CBF headquarters in Rio de Janeiro.

Team 1	Agg.	Team 2	1st leg	2nd leg
Vasco da Gama	3–3 (5–4 p)	Athletico Paranaense	2–1	1–2
São Paulo	0–1	Atlético Mineiro	0–1	0–0
Bahia	0–2	Flamengo	0–1	0–1
Juventude	3–4	Corinthians	2–1	1–3

=== Semi-finals ===
The draw for the semi-finals was held on 20 September at the CBF headquarters in Rio de Janeiro. Owing to requests from Flamengo and Atlético Mineiro due to the FIFA Calendar, the dates of the second leg matches were changed from 17 to 19 and 20 October.

Team 1	Agg.	Team 2	1st leg	2nd leg
Atlético Mineiro	3–2	Vasco da Gama	2–1	1–1
Flamengo	1–0	Corinthians	1–0	0–0

=== Finals ===
The draw for the finals was held on 24 October at the CBF headquarters in Rio de Janeiro.

3 November 2024
16:00 UTC−3

Flamengo (Rio de Janeiro (state))	3–1	(Minas Gerais) Atlético Mineiro
De Arrascaeta 11'; Gabriel Barbosa 39', 74'	Report	Alan Kardec 79'

Maracanã, Rio de Janeiro
Attendance: 67,459
Referee: Rafael Rodrigo Klein (Rio Grande do Sul)
10 November 2024
16:00 UTC−3

Atlético Mineiro (Minas Gerais)	0–1	(Rio de Janeiro (state)) Flamengo
		Plata 82'

Arena MRV, Belo Horizonte
Attendance: 44,876
Referee: Raphael Claus (São Paulo)

Copa do Brasil
2024 champions
Flamengo
5th title

== Top goalscorers ==
Rank	Player	Team	Goals
1	(Argentina) Pablo Vegetti	(Rio de Janeiro (state)) Vasco da Gama	7
2	(Uruguay) Emiliano Rodríguez	(Goiás) Atlético Goianiense	4
2	(Ecuador) Enner Valencia	(Rio Grande do Sul) Internacional	4
3	(Brazil) Alex Sandro	(São Paulo (state)) Botafogo-SP	3
3	(Paraguay) Ángel Romero	(São Paulo (state)) Corinthians	3
3	(Brazil) Braga	(Pará) Águia de Marabá	3
3	(Brazil) Luan Dias	(São Paulo (state)) Água Santa	3
3	(Brazil) Cauly	Bahia	3
3	(Brazil) Lucas Piton	(Rio de Janeiro (state)) Vasco da Gama	3
3	(Brazil) Lucas Barbosa	(Rio Grande do Sul) Juventude	3
3	(Brazil) Gilberto	(Rio Grande do Sul) Juventude	3
3	(Brazil) Pedro	(Rio de Janeiro (state)) Flamengo	3

=== Team of the tournament ===
Position	Player	Team
Goalkeeper	(Argentina) Agustín Rossi	(Brazil) Flamengo
Defenders	(Brazil) Wesley França	(Brazil) Flamengo
Defenders	(Brazil) Léo Ortiz	(Brazil) Flamengo
Defenders	(Brazil) André Ramalho	(Brazil) Corinthians
Defenders	(Brazil) Guilherme Arana	(Brazil) Atlético Mineiro
Midfielders	(Brazil) Gustavo Scarpa	(Brazil) Atlético Mineiro
Midfielders	(Brazil) Gerson	(Brazil) Flamengo
Midfielders	(Chile) Erick Pulgar	(Brazil) Flamengo
Midfielders	(Uruguay) Giorgian de Arrascaeta	(Brazil) Flamengo
Forwards	(Argentina) Pablo Vegetti	(Brazil) Vasco da Gama
Forwards	(Brazil) Gabriel Barbosa	(Brazil) Flamengo
