= João Vitor (footballer, born 1998) =

Brazilian footballer

Personal information
- Full name: João Vitor de Souza Martins
- Date of birth: 31 March 1998 (age 28)
- Place of birth: João Pessoa, Brazil
- Height: 1.77 m (5 ft 10 in)
- Position: Midfielder

Team information
- Current team: Londrina (on loan from CSP)
- Number: 20

Youth career
- São Paulo Crystal

Senior career*
Years	Team	Apps	(Gls)
2020–	CSP	20	(8)
2020–2021	→ Primavera (loan)	23	(0)
2021	→ Caldense (loan)	11	(1)
2022	→ Primavera (loan)	16	(0)
2023	→ Caldense (loan)	9	(0)
2023	→ CEOV (loan)	15	(1)
2024	→ Vila Nova (loan)	37	(1)
2025	→ Avaí (loan)	49	(5)
2026	→ Chapecoense (loan)	19	(2)
2026–	→ Londrina (loan)	15	(5)
- * Club domestic league appearances and goals as of 18 November 2026

João Vitor de Souza Martins (born 31 March 1998), known as João Vitor, is a Brazilian footballer who plays for Londrina, on loan from CSP. Mainly a midfielder, he can also play as a right-back.

== Career ==
Born in João Pessoa, Paraíba, João Vitor played one Copa São Paulo de Futebol Júnior for São Paulo Crystal in 2019 before having to spend the entire year sidelined after recovering from a bullet in the face, after an armed robbery. He began his career at CSP in 2020, and subsequently moved to Primavera on loan.

On 7 July 2021, João Vitor moved to Caldense also on loan. He played the 2022 at Primavera again, before spending a period back at Caldense and at CEOV.

On 14 December 2023, João Vitor agreed to a one-year deal with Série B side Vila Nova. On 6 December of the following year, still owned by CSP, he moved to fellow league team Avaí.

On 31 December 2025, Chapecoense announced the signing of João Vitor on a one-year loan deal.

== Career statistics ==
As of 6 January 2026

Club	Season	League			State League		Cup		Continental		Other		Total	
Club	Season	Division	Apps	Goals	Apps	Goals	Apps	Goals	Apps	Goals	Apps	Goals	Apps	Goals
CSP	2020	Paraibano	—		10	2	—		—		—		10	2
CSP	2021	Paraibano 2ª Divisão	—		10	6	—		—		—		10	6
CSP	Total		—		20	8	—		—		—		20	8
Primavera (loan)	2020	Paulista A3	—		4	0	—		—		8 (Note: Appearance(s) in Copa Paulista)	0	14	0
Primavera (loan)	2021	Paulista A3	—		19	0	—		—		—		19	0
Primavera (loan)	Total		—		23	0	—		—		8	0	33	0
Caldense (loan)	2021	Série D	11	1	—		—		—		—		11	1
Primavera (loan)	2022	Paulista A2	—		16	0	—		—		9	0	25	0
Caldense (loan)	2023	Mineiro	—		9	0	1	0	—		—		10	0
CEOV (loan)	2023	Série D	15	1	—		—		—		7 (Note: Appearance(s) in Copa FMF)	3	22	4
Vila Nova (loan)	2024	Série B	23	1	14	0	—		—		6 (Note: Appearance(s) in Copa Verde)	0	43	1
Avaí (loan)	2025	Série B	35	3	14	2	—		—		—		49	5
Chapecoense	2026	Série A	0	0	0	0	0	0	—		—		0	0
Career total			84	6	96	10	1	0	0	0	30	3	211	19

== Honours ==
CSP

- Campeonato Paraibano Segunda Divisão: 2021

Avaí

- Campeonato Catarinense: 2025
