= 2024 Vila Nova Futebol Clube season =

Vila Nova Futebol Clube
2024 season
- Manager: Márcio Fernandes (until 23 May); Luizinho Lopes (from 24 May)
- Stadium: Estádio Serra Dourada
- Série B: 9th
- Top goalscorer: Henrique Almeida (3)

The 2024 Vila Nova Futebol Clube season was the club's 81st season in existence and the fourth consecutive season in the second division of Brazilian football. In addition to the domestic league, Vila Nova participated in this season's editions of the Campeonato Goiano and the Copa do Brasil.

== Pre-season and friendlies ==
Win Draw Loss

== Competitions ==
=== Overall record ===
Competition	First match	Last match	Starting round	Final position	Record							
Competition	First match	Last match	Starting round	Final position	Pld	W	D	L	GF	GA	GD	Win %
Série B	23 April 2024	26 November 2024	Matchday 1		37	16	7	14	41	52	−11	43.24
Campeonato Goiano	18 January 2024	7 April 2024			17	10	3	4	24	14	+10	58.82
Copa do Brasil	28 February 2024	7 March 2024	First round	Second round	2	1	0	1	1	2	−1	50.00
Total					56	27	10	19	66	68	−2	48.21

Source: Soccerway

=== Campeonato Brasileiro Série B ===
==== League table ====
Pos	Team	Pld	W	D	L	GF	GA	GD	Pts
7	Operário Ferroviário	38	16	10	12	34	32	+2	58
8	América Mineiro	38	15	13	10	50	35	+15	58
9	Vila Nova	38	16	7	15	42	54	−12	55
10	Avaí	38	14	11	13	34	32	+2	53
11	Amazonas	38	14	10	14	31	37	−6	52

Source: CBF
Rules for classification: 1) points; 2) wins; 3) goal difference; 4) goals scored; 5) head-to-head results (only between 2 teams); 6) fewest red cards; 7) fewest yellow cards; 8) drawing of lots.

==== Results summary ====
Overall								Home						Away					
Pld	W	D	L	GF	GA	GD	Pts	W	D	L	GF	GA	GD	W	D	L	GF	GA	GD
12	6	2	4	14	13	+1	20	6	1	0	12	5	+7	0	1	4	2	8	−6

Last updated: 23 June 2024.

==== Results by round ====
Round	1	2	3	4	5	6	7	8	9	10	11	12	13
Ground	H	A	H	A	H	A	H	A	H	A	H	H	A
Result	W	L	W	L	W	L	D	D	W	L	W	W	
Position													

Updated to match(es) played on 23 June 2024. Source:
A = Away; H = Home; W = Win; D = Draw; L = Loss
