= Izabella Camargo =

Brazilian journalist

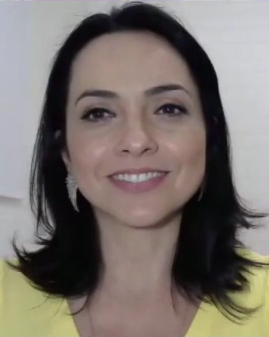
- Camargo in 2023.
- Born: February 1, 1981 (age 45); Apucarana, Paraná, Brazil
- Occupation: Journalist
- Children: 2

Izabella Spaggiari Brazil Camargo, better known as Izabella Camargo (born February 1, 1981), is a Brazilian journalist. She began her career as a dancer on the SBT show Fantasia before working in radio and television.

== Biography ==
Izabella was born in Apucarana, but lived most of her childhood and adolescence on the farm, in Cambira. At age 16, after having participated in some beauty contests (common in cities in the interior) she moved to São Paulo and started working as a dancer on the show Fantasia, on SBT.

=== From Fantasia to radio ===
In 1997, the country was experiencing the peak of 0800 calls and 50 young people danced and participated in games from Monday to Friday afternoons. A few months after her debut, music producer Arnaldo Saccomani was selecting some voices from the cast to record a CD with the main songs of the moment and suggested that she look for a course in radio or journalism because her voice was already deeper than most of the other teenagers.

=== From radio to TV channels ===
After this experience on TV and the vocational course at the Serviço Nacional de Aprendizagem Comercial of São Paulo, with DRT, she started working on entertainment programs on radio stations Energia 97 and Jovem Pan FM.

Then she did journalism at Universidade São Judas Tadeu and post-graduated in Marketing in Communication at the Cásper Líbero Foundation.

In 2006 she began her career at Grupo Bandeirantes de Comunicação. On BandNews TV she presented the news programs until the beginning of 2009. She was the standard voice of Rádio Sulamérica Trânsito and from 2009 to 2012 she worked as a reporter and presenter on Band. In 2011, she was classified among the 10 finalists of the Esso Journalism Award and received an honorable mention for the series of reports on the "Neighbors of crack" - people, churches, businesses and schools that have lived with users' addiction for years around Rua Helvétia, in the center of São Paulo.

In March 2009, she left BandNews TV to work as a reporter for the SBT program Olha Você. As soon as she arrived at SBT she was selected to work in one of the vacancies of presentation of the program that was undergoing reformulations. However, she only hosted for a week, before the show went off the air. In May 2012, she started working as a reporter at TV Globo São Paulo. In August of the same year, she also joined the team of presenters of the weather forecast, rotating on all the broadcaster's newscasts. In 2015, she began to participate in presenter rotation of SPTV, in April of the same year she became the head of weather forecast on the news programs Hora Um da Notícia and Bom Dia Brasil, replaced Monalisa Perrone in the presentation of Hora Um, in addition to, eventually, presenting Bom Dia São Paulo.

On July 30, 2018, she also started to present the weather forecast in the newly created newscast GloboNews em Ponto, on the GloboNews channel, between Hora Um and Bom Dia Brasil.

=== Burnout syndrome ===
Between August 14 and October 27 she was removed on medical recommendation to treat Burnout syndrome. Upon returning to work on the 29th, she was dismissed without just cause. In 2019, the court ordered the broadcaster to rehire the journalist.

=== Ministry of Science, Technology, Innovations and Communications and return to Globo ===
In January 2019, she accepted the invitation of the Minister and astronaut Marcos Pontes to join the MCTIC communication team.

During the first 100 days of government, she contributed, among other activities, to reports on Antarctica and the Technological Safeguards Agreement and in April 2019 she resigned from her post. In September 2019 she was rehired by Globo, working in the newsroom of weather forecast.

=== Career as a YouTuber ===
In April 2020, the presenter launched the channel Dá um Tempo!.

== Awards ==
2011 - Esso Journalism Award - report "Vizinhos do Crack" - Honorable Mention.

== Personal life ==
Since 2024, Izabella is married to the financial educator Thiago Godoy, with whom she has two children: Angelina, born in 2021, and Antonio, born in 2025.
