= Thomazella =

Brazilian footballer

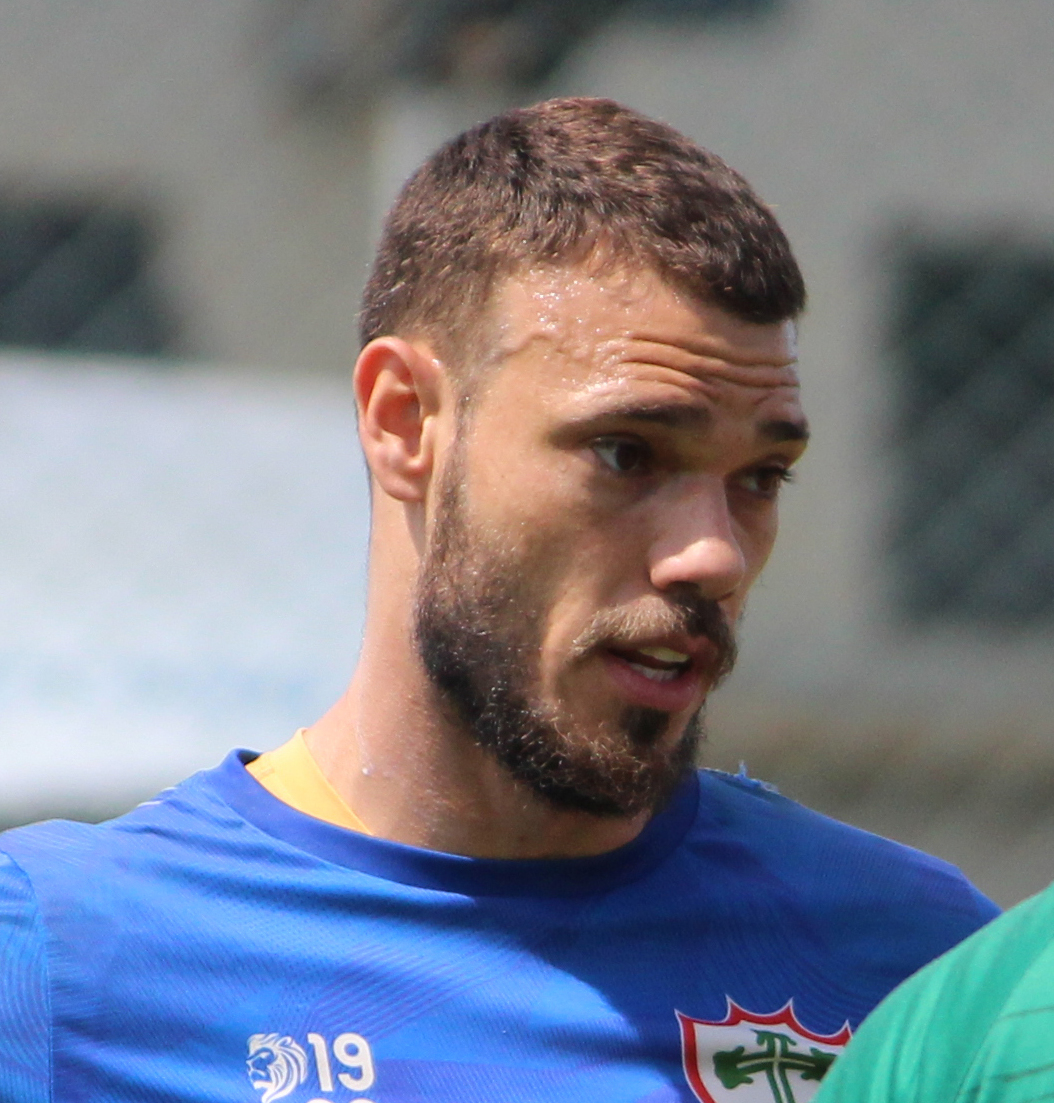
- Thomazella in 2021

Personal information
- Full name: Carlos Eduardo Lecciolle Thomazella
- Date of birth: 18 August 1990 (age 36)
- Place of birth: Botucatu, Brazil
- Height: 1.91 m (6 ft 3 in)
- Position: Goalkeeper

Team information
- Current team: Mirassol
- Number: 90

Youth career
- São Caetano

Senior career*
Years	Team	Apps	(Gls)
2010–2011	São Caetano	0	(0)
2010	→ XV de Piracicaba (loan)	0	(0)
2012	São José-SP	0	(0)
2012	Icasa	6	(0)
2013	Caldense	0	(0)
2013	Guarani	2	(0)
2014	Batatais	12	(0)
2014–2016	Luverdense	19	(0)
2017	Rio Claro	2	(0)
2019	Santo André	19	(0)
2019–2020	Água Santa	4	(0)
2020–2024	Portuguesa	59	(0)
2024	→ CSA (loan)	8	(0)
2024	→ Mirassol (loan)	0	(0)
2025–	Mirassol	0	(0)
- * Club domestic league appearances and goals as of 19:37, 15 November 2024 (UTC)

Carlos Eduardo Lecciolle Thomazella (born 18 August 1990), commonly known as Thomazella, is a Brazilian footballer who plays as a goalkeeper for Mirassol.

== Club career ==
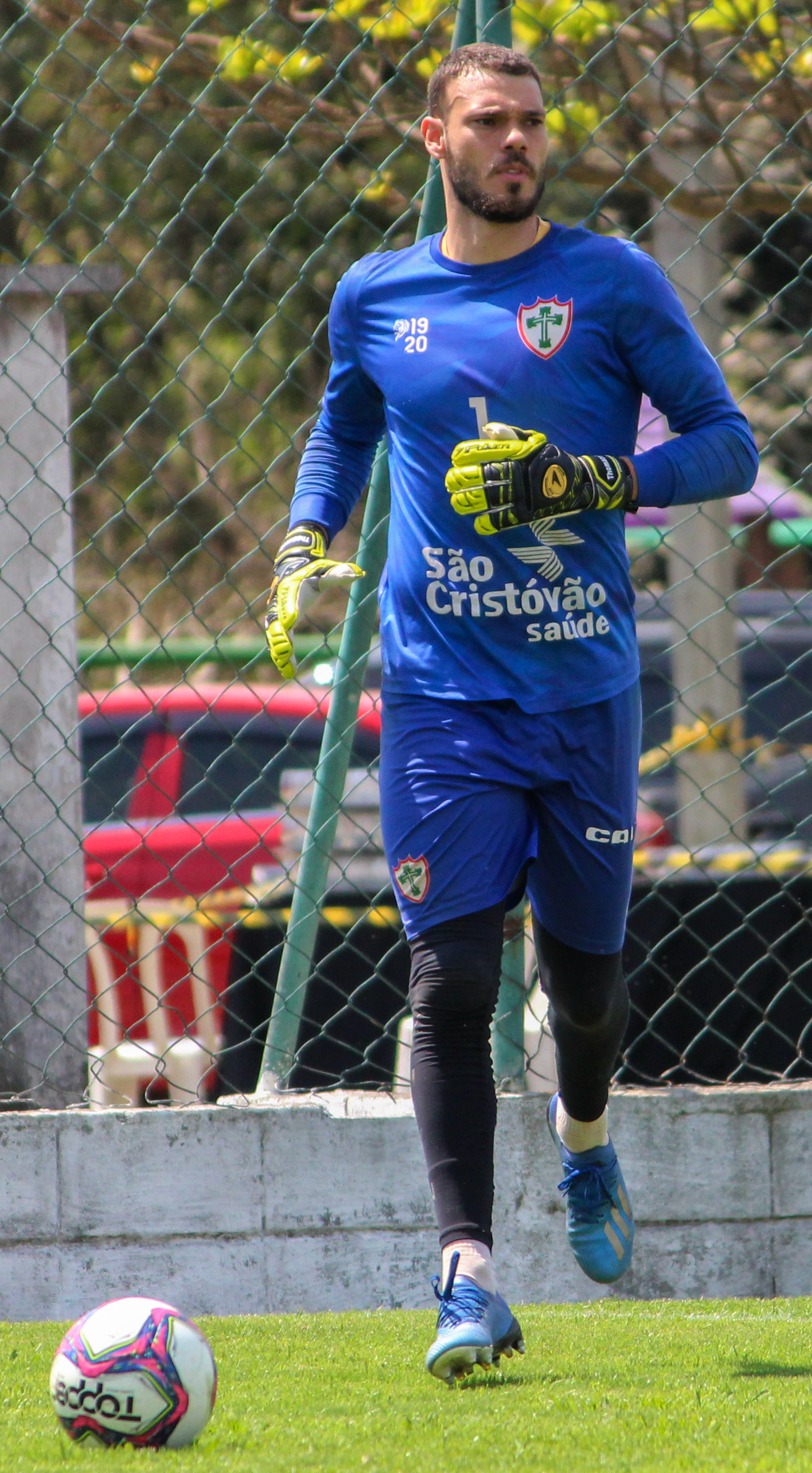
Thomazella with Portuguesa in 2021

Born in Botucatu, São Paulo, Thomazella was a São Caetano youth graduate. He started to appear in the first team squad in 2010, as a backup, before joining XV de Piracicaba on loan.

After again being a backup option in 2011, Thomazella moved to São José-SP ahead of the 2012 season, but was again a second-choice. He subsequently signed for Série C side Icasa, making his senior debut with the side on 1 July 2012 by starting in a 0–0 away draw against Cuiabá.

In December 2012, Thomazella agreed to a deal with Caldense. Despite being again a backup, he was presented at Guarani on 6 May 2013, where he also featured rarely.

On 11 December 2013, Thomazella signed for Batatais for the upcoming season. After being a regular starter, he moved to Série B side Luverdense in May 2014.

On 22 December 2016, Thomazella joined Rio Claro for the 2017 campaign. A backup option, he spent the entire 2018 without a club, before signing for Santo André on 28 November of that year.

On 5 June 2019, Thomazella was presented at Água Santa. On 6 October of the following year, he moved to Portuguesa, and was a backup to Dheimison as the club won the Copa Paulista.

Thomazella shared the starting spot with Dheimison during the 2021 season at Lusa, and became an undisputed starter in 2022, after Dheimison left for ABC. On 27 May 2022, after winning that year's Campeonato Paulista Série A2, he renewed his contract until 2024.

On 4 April 2024, Thomazella was announced at CSA on loan until the end of the year. On 29 August, he was presented at Mirassol also on loan.

A backup option to Alex Muralha, Thomazella signed a permanent deal with Mirassol on 10 January 2025.

== Career statistics ==
As of 11 January 2025

Club	Season	League			State League		Cup		Continental		Other		Total	
Club	Season	Division	Apps	Goals	Apps	Goals	Apps	Goals	Apps	Goals	Apps	Goals	Apps	Goals
São Caetano	2010	Série B	0	0	0	0	—		—		—		0	0
São Caetano	2011	Série B	0	0	0	0	—		—		—		0	0
São Caetano	Total		0	0	0	0	—		—		—		0	0
XV de Piracicaba (loan)	2010	Paulista A2	—		0	0	—		—		0	0	0	0
São José-SP	2012	Paulista A2	—		0	0	—		—		—		0	0
Icasa	2012	Série C	6	0	—		—		—		—		6	0
Caldense	2013	Mineiro	—		0	0	—		—		—		0	0
Guarani	2013	Série C	2	0	—		—		—		—		2	0
Batatais	2014	Paulista A2	—		12	0	—		—		—		12	0
Luverdense	2014	Série B	5	0	—		—		—		—		5	0
Luverdense	2015	Série B	1	0	12	0	2	0	—		6 (Note: Appearance(s) in Copa Verde)	0	21	0
Luverdense	2016	Série B	0	0	1	0	—		—		0	0	1	0
Luverdense	Total		6	0	13	0	2	0	—		6	0	27	0
Rio Claro	2017	Paulista A2	—		2	0	—		—		—		2	0
Santo André	2019	Paulista A2	—		19	0	—		—		—		19	0
Água Santa	2019	Paulista A2	—		0	0	—		—		15 (Note: Appearance(s) in Copa Paulista)	0	15	0
Água Santa	2020	Paulista	—		4	0	—		—		—		4	0
Água Santa	Total		—		4	0	—		—		15	0	19	0
Portuguesa	2020	Paulista A2	—		0	0	—		—		1	0	1	0
Portuguesa	2021	Série D	0	0	13	0	—		—		11	0	24	0
Portuguesa	2022	Paulista A2	—		20	0	—		—		10	0	30	0
Portuguesa	2023	Paulista	—		13	0	—		—		2	0	15	0
Portuguesa	2024	Paulista	—		13	0	—		—		—		13	0
Portuguesa	Total		0	0	59	0	—		—		24	0	83	0
CSA (loan)	2024	Série C	8	0	—		—		—		—		8	0
Mirassol	2024	Série B	0	0	—		—		—		—		0	0
Mirassol	2025	Série A	0	0	0	0	—		—		—		0	0
Mirassol	Total		0	0	0	0	—		—		—		0	0
Career total			22	0	109	0	2	0	0	0	45	0	178	0

== Honours ==
=== Club ===
Luverdense

- Campeonato Mato-Grossense: 2016

Santo André

- Campeonato Paulista Série A2: 2019

Portuguesa

- Copa Paulista: 2020
- Campeonato Paulista Série A2: 2022

=== Individual ===
- Campeonato Paulista Série A2 Best XI: 2022
