= Apucarana =

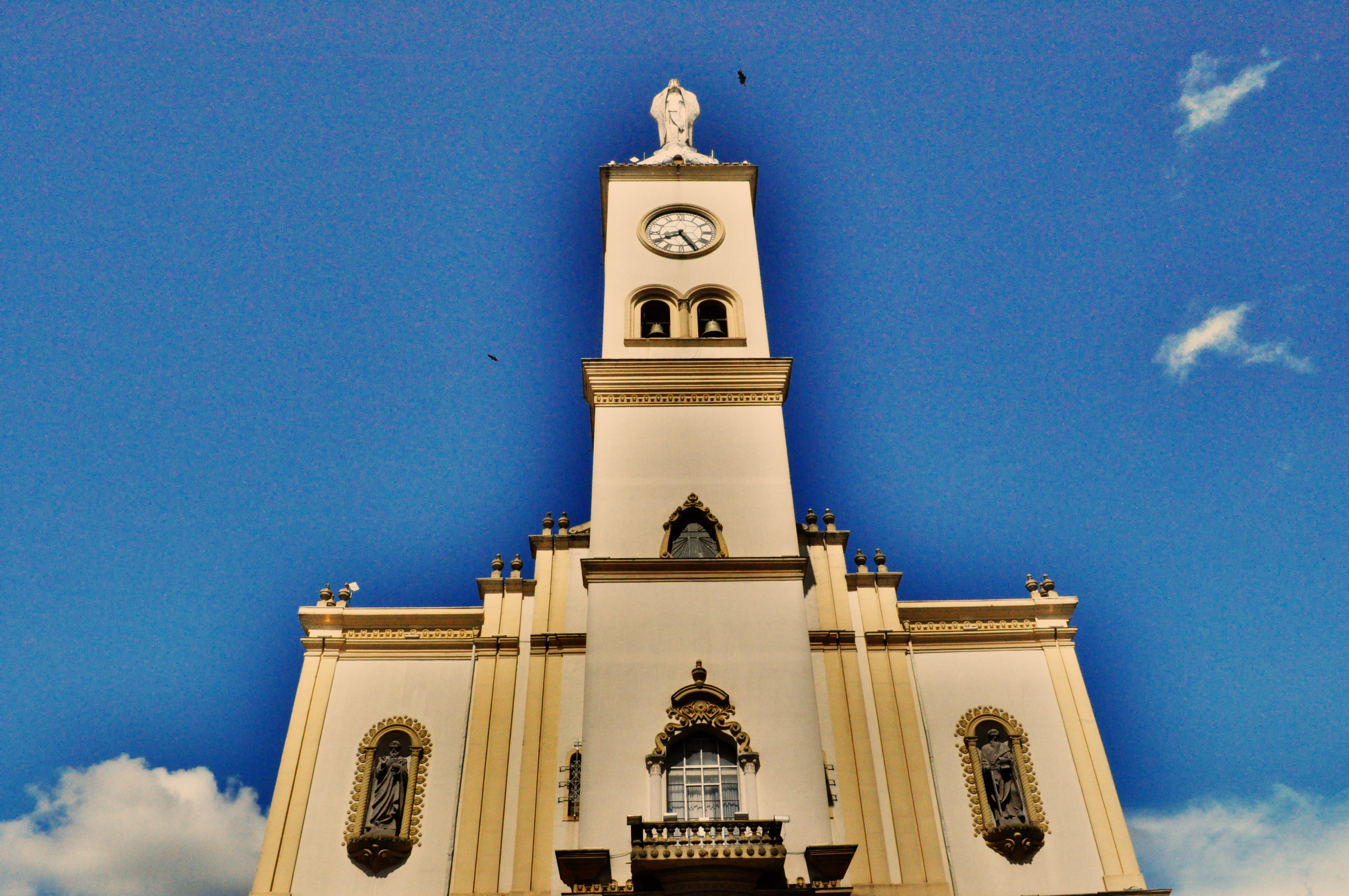

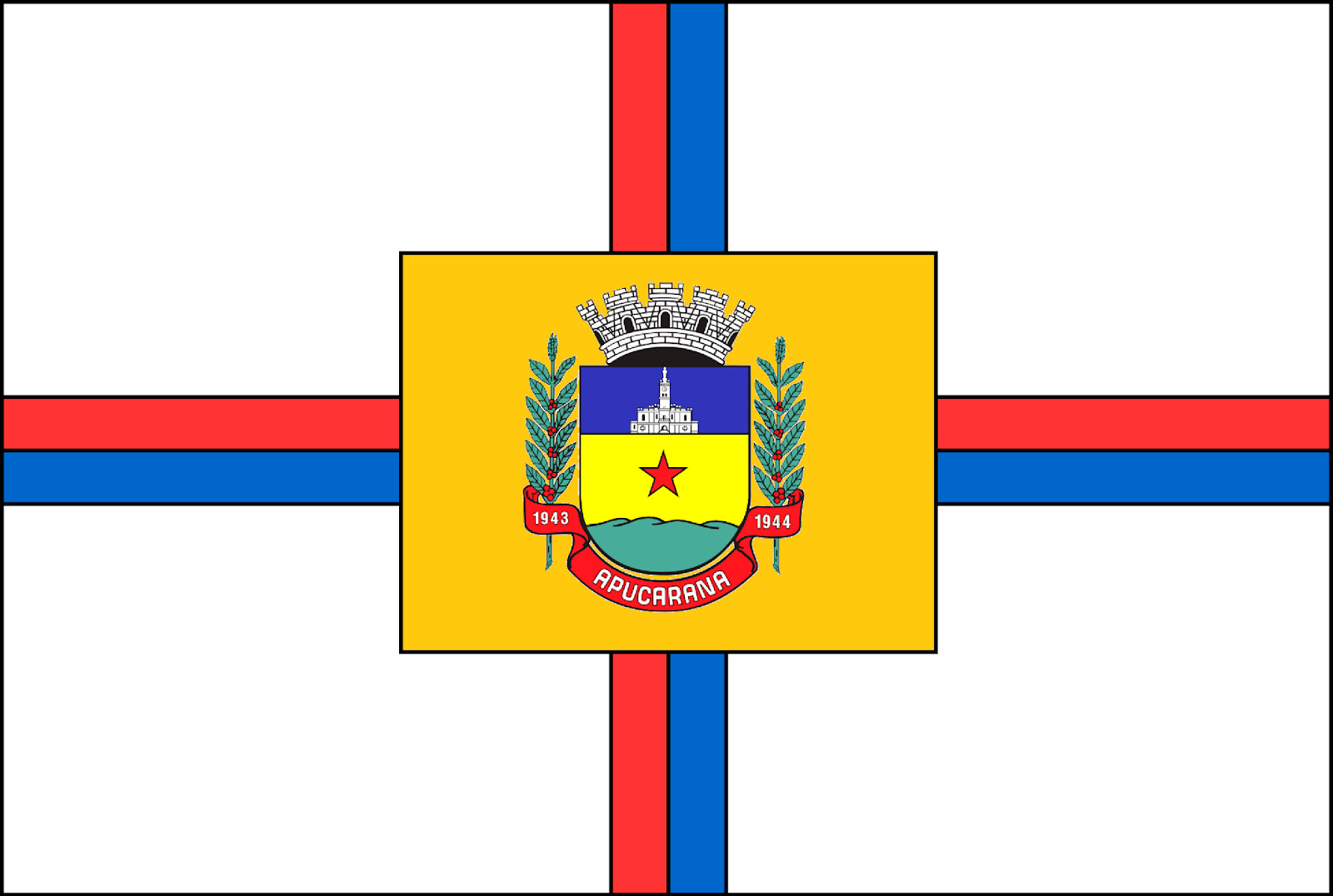
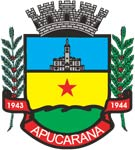
- Flag Coat of arms

- Location within Brazil
- Coordinates: 23°33′03″S 51°27′39″W
- Country: Brazil
- Region: South
- State: Paraná
- Founded: 1944

Area
  - Total: 548 km^{2} (212 sq mi)
- Elevation: 840 m (2,760 ft)

Population (2022 Census)
  - Total: 130,134
  - Estimate (2025): 134,910
  - Density: 237/km^{2} (615/sq mi)
- Demonym: Apucaranense
- Time zone: UTC-3 (UTC-3)
- Postal code: 86800
- Area code: (+55) 43
- Website: Official website (in Portuguese)

Apucarana is a municipality in the state of Paraná in Brazil. The municipality covers 548 square kilometres (212 sq mi) at an elevation of 840 metres (2,760 ft) above mean sea level. Its 2025 population was estimated as 134,910.

== History ==
The region in which the city is located was colonized by the Northern Paraná Land Company (CTNP), like Londrina and Maringá. The colonizers arrived around 1930. In 1938, Apucarana became a regional village. Desiring that the city be elevated to a municipality in July 1944, the pro-emancipation movement saw a visit by Interventor Manoel Ribas as a prime opportunity. After careful analysis of the considerations presented, the Interventor decided to grant the request.

With the creation of the District and Municipality of Apucarana in late 1943, the installation ceremony and the inauguration of the first appointed mayor, Colonel Luiz José dos Santos, were scheduled for the following year. Definitively separated from Londrina, Apucarana was elevated to a municipality on 28 January 1944.

== Transportation ==
The city is served by Cap. João Busse Airport which is located 10 kilometers (5 nautical miles) southeast of Apucarana.

== Economy ==
In agriculture, the city stands in production of coffee, soy, beans and corn. The industry stands out for leather production (3% of Brazil's total) and the manufacturing of caps (80% of production in Brazil).

== Culture ==
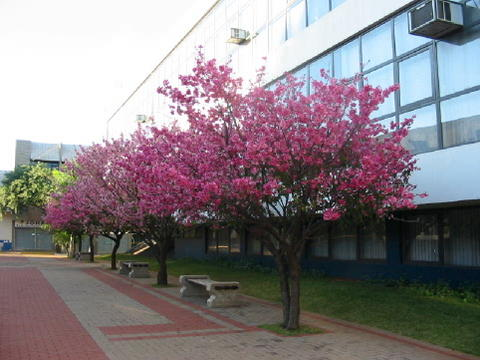
Cherry blossom in Apucarana. The first hundred trees were planted by Japanese descendants in the 1980s. Today the city has more than 20.000 sakuras.

The city received thousands of immigrants from Portugal, Ukraine, Poland, Germany and especially from Japan (who did strong influence in culture like in the Buddhist religion and the amount of cherry trees planted - the city has more than 20,000 sakuras and annually do the "Cherry Festival" to celebrate the Japanese culture).

Races	
White	71.95%
Brown	17.84%
Black	5.97%
Asian	3.77%
Natives	0.47%

source : PARDES 2010

=== Religion ===
The city is the seat of the Roman Catholic Diocese of Apucarana.

== Illustrious Apucaranenses ==
- Alysson - Footballer
- Anderson - Retired footballer
- Bruno Henrique - Footballer
- César Romero - Footballer
- Gazão - Footballer
- Giovane Vieira de Paula - Paracanoeist
- Guilherme Azevedo - Footballer
- Izabella Camargo - Journalist
- Randas Batista - medical doctor and cardiac surgeon

== Climate ==
Climate data for Apucarana, elevation 746 m (2,448 ft), (1976–2005 normals, extremes 1962–2002)
Month	Jan	Feb	Mar	Apr	May	Jun	Jul	Aug	Sep	Oct	Nov	Dec	Year
Record high °C (°F)	34.7 (94.5)	34.2 (93.6)	33.3 (91.9)	32.6 (90.7)	30.2 (86.4)	29.0 (84.2)	30.8 (87.4)	33.1 (91.6)	36.5 (97.7)	34.9 (94.8)	37.6 (99.7)	35.0 (95.0)	37.6 (99.7)
Mean daily maximum °C (°F)	28.4 (83.1)	28.4 (83.1)	28.3 (82.9)	26.5 (79.7)	23.6 (74.5)	22.3 (72.1)	22.6 (72.7)	24.6 (76.3)	25.3 (77.5)	26.9 (80.4)	27.8 (82.0)	28.0 (82.4)	26.1 (78.9)
Daily mean °C (°F)	23.0 (73.4)	23.0 (73.4)	22.7 (72.9)	20.9 (69.6)	18.4 (65.1)	17.1 (62.8)	17.1 (62.8)	18.7 (65.7)	19.5 (67.1)	21.1 (70.0)	22.0 (71.6)	22.6 (72.7)	20.5 (68.9)
Mean daily minimum °C (°F)	19.3 (66.7)	19.4 (66.9)	18.8 (65.8)	16.9 (62.4)	14.9 (58.8)	13.7 (56.7)	13.3 (55.9)	14.6 (58.3)	15.2 (59.4)	16.6 (61.9)	17.5 (63.5)	18.6 (65.5)	16.6 (61.8)
Record low °C (°F)	11.0 (51.8)	12.6 (54.7)	8.0 (46.4)	2.8 (37.0)	0.1 (32.2)	−1.0 (30.2)	−4.7 (23.5)	−0.4 (31.3)	2.4 (36.3)	7.2 (45.0)	9.0 (48.2)	10.9 (51.6)	−4.7 (23.5)
Average precipitation mm (inches)	209.6 (8.25)	186.9 (7.36)	153.7 (6.05)	116.8 (4.60)	135.2 (5.32)	122.4 (4.82)	66.0 (2.60)	63.7 (2.51)	138.5 (5.45)	161.8 (6.37)	153.7 (6.05)	196.7 (7.74)	1,705 (67.12)
Average precipitation days (≥ 1.0 mm)	15	14	12	8	8	7	6	6	8	10	11	13	118
Average relative humidity (%)	76	77	74	70	70	70	64	60	63	66	66	73	69
Mean monthly sunshine hours	210.2	185.8	225.9	229.8	217.2	210.5	237.8	231.2	196.5	218.7	220.6	206.7	2,590.9
Source 1: Empresa Brasileira de Pesquisa Agropecuária (EMBRAPA)
Source 2: IDR-Paraná (precipitation days and sun 1962–2002)
