= 2024 Copa do Brasil third round =

2024 Copa do Brasil football competition

The 2024 Copa do Brasil third round is the third round of the 2024 Copa do Brasil football competition. It will be played from 30 April to 23 May 2024. A total of 32 teams who qualified for the second round will compete for 16 places in the final rounds of the competition.

== Draw ==
The draw for the third round was held on 17 April at the CBF headquarters in Rio de Janeiro. The 32 teams, qualified from the previous round, were placed into two pots, seeded by their national ranking, and then drawn into 16 ties. A second draw determined the home and away teams for each leg. Each team's CBF ranking is shown in parentheses.

Pot A	Pot B
Flamengo (1); Palmeiras (2); São Paulo (3); Athletico Paranaense (4); Atlético Mineiro (5); Corinthians (6); Fluminense (7); Fortaleza (8); Grêmio (9); Internacional (11); Bahia (13); Botafogo (14); Red Bull Bragantino (15); Atlético Goianiense (16); Ceará (18); Cuiabá (19)	Goiás (20); Vasco da Gama (22); Juventude (23); Sport (24); CRB (26); Vitória (28); Criciúma (30); Sampaio Corrêa (33); Operário Ferroviário (35); Botafogo-SP (42); Brusque (43); Ypiranga (49); América de Natal (58); Amazonas (66); Sousa (90); Águia de Marabá (92)

== Format ==
In the third round, each tie was played on a home-and-away two-legged basis. If the aggregate score was level, the second-leg match would go straight to a penalty shoot-out to determine the winners.

== Matches ==
The fixture list was confirmed by CBF on 17 April 2024 following the draw. Times are BRT (UTC–3), as listed by CBF (local times, if different, are in parentheses).

Team 1	Agg.	Team 2	1st leg	2nd leg
Bahia	3–0	Criciúma	1–0	2–0
Operário Ferroviário	1–3	Grêmio	0–0	1–3
Atlético Mineiro	2–1	Sport	2–0	0–1
Sampaio Corrêa	0–4	Fluminense	0–2	0–2
Brusque	2–5	Atlético Goianiense	0–1	2–4
Sousa	1–4	Red Bull Bragantino	1–1	0–3
Ypiranga	2–4	Athletico Paranaense	2–1	0–3
Fortaleza	3–3 (4–5 p)	Vasco da Gama	0–0	3–3
América de Natal	2–4	Corinthians	1–2	1–2
Flamengo	2–0	Amazonas	1–0	1–0
Internacional	2–3	Juventude	1–2	1–1
Botafogo	3–1	Vitória	1–0	2–1
Águia de Marabá	1–5	São Paulo	1–3	0–2
CRB	2–0	Ceará	1–0	1–0
Goiás	1–1 (3–1 p)	Cuiabá	1–0	0–1
Palmeiras	2–1	Botafogo-SP	2–1	0–0

30 April 2024
19:00

Bahia	1–0	Criciúma
Thaciano 56'

Arena Fonte Nova, Salvador
23 May 2024
19:00

Criciúma	0–2	Bahia
	Report	Carlos de Pena 87'; Jean Lucas 90+3'

Heriberto Hülse, Criciúma
Referee: Raphael Claus

Bahia won 3–0 on aggregate.

30 April 2024
20:00

Operário Ferroviário	0–0	Grêmio

Germano Krüger, Ponta Grossa
14 July 2024
11:00

Grêmio	3–1	Operário Ferroviário
Pavón 22' (pen.); Everton Galdino 32'; Gustavo Nunes 54'		Ronaldo 30'

Estádio Centenário, Caxias do Sul

Grêmio won 3–1 on aggregate.

30 April 2024
21:30

Atlético Mineiro	2–0	Sport
Zaracho 29'; Arana 58'

Arena MRV, Belo Horizonte
22 May 2024
20:00

Sport	1–0	Atlético Mineiro
Chrystian Barletta 13'	Report

Arena Pernambuco, São Lourenço da Mata
Referee: Bráulio da Silva Machado

Atlético Mineiro won 2–1 on aggregate.

1 May 2024
16:00

Sampaio Corrêa	0–2	Fluminense
		Lima 33'; Arias 86' (pen.)

Kléber Andrade, Cariacica
22 May 2024
19:00

Fluminense	2–0	Sampaio Corrêa
Arias 19'; John Kennedy 79'	Report

Maracanã, Rio de Janeiro
Referee: Edina Alves Batista

Fluminense won 4–0 on aggregate.

1 May 2024
16:00

Brusque	0–1	Atlético Goianiense
		Luiz Fernando 76'

Arena Joinville, Joinville
22 May 2024
19:00

Atlético Goianiense	4–2	Brusque
Luiz Fernando 11'; Shaylon 29'; Rhaldney 33'; Maguinho 56'	Report	Mateus Pivô 40', 87'

Estádio Antônio Accioly, Goiânia
Referee: Luiz Flávio de Oliveira

Atlético Goianiense won 5–2 on aggregate.

1 May 2024
18:00

Sousa	1–1	Red Bull Bragantino
Batata 83'		Luan Cândido 34' (pen.)

Marizão, Sousa
21 May 2024
19:30

Red Bull Bragantino	3–0	Sousa
Juninho 25'; Gustavinho 59'; Mosquera 71'

Nabi Abi Chedid, Bragança Paulista

Red Bull Bragantino won 4–1 on aggregate.

1 May 2024
18:00

Ypiranga	2–1	Athletico Paranaense
Anderson 90+6'; Fabrício 90+8'		Canobbio 35'

Colosso da Lagoa, Erechim
13 July 2024
18:00

Athletico Paranaense	3–0	Ypiranga
Fernandinho 25'; Julimar 47'; Di Yorio 90+6'

Arena da Baixada, Curitiba

Athletico Paranaense won 4–2 on aggregate.

1 May 2024
19:00

Fortaleza	0–0	Vasco da Gama

Castelão, Fortaleza
21 May 2024
21:30

Vasco da Gama	3–3	Fortaleza
Pablo Vegetti 16' (pen.), 65'; Lucas Piton 75'	Report	Marinho 7'; Lucero 54'; Hércules 88'
Penalties
Dimitri Payet (penalty scored); Juan Sforza (penalty scored); Lucas Piton (penalty scored); Pumita Rodríguez (penalty scored); Pablo Vegetti (penalty scored)	5–4	(penalty scored) Lucero; (penalty scored) Yago Pikachu; (penalty scored) Hércules; (penalty scored) Zé Welison; (penalty missed) Kervin Andrade

São Januário, Rio de Janeiro
Referee: Wilton Pereira Sampaio

3–3 on aggregate. Vasco da Gama won 5–4 on penalties.

1 May 2024
20:00

América de Natal	1–2	Corinthians
Neto 13'		Bidon 30'; Cacá 63'

Arena das Dunas, Natal
22 May 2024
20:00

Corinthians	2–1	América de Natal
Yuri Alberto 41'; Cacá 90+1'	Report	Wenderson 51'

Arena Corinthians, São Paulo
Referee: Lucas Paulo Torezin

Corinthians won 4–2 on aggregate.

1 May 2024
21:30

Flamengo	1–0	Amazonas
Pedro 20'

Maracanã, Rio de Janeiro
22 May 2024
21:30
(20:30 UTC−4)

Amazonas	0–1	Flamengo
	Report	Pedro 79'

Arena da Amazônia, Manaus
Referee: Ramon Abatti Abel

Flamengo won 2–0 on aggregate.

10 July 2024
19:00

Internacional	1–2	Juventude
Valencia 72'	Report	Gilberto 35', Luís 90+4'

Beira-Rio, Porto Alegre
Referee: Flavio Rodrigues de Souza
13 July 2024
16:00

Juventude	1–1	Internacional
Rodrigo Sam 45+7'		Valencia (pen.), 79'

Alfredo Jaconi, Caxias do Sul

Juventude won 3–2 on aggregate.

2 May 2024
19:00

Botafogo	1–0	Vitória
Eduardo 65'

Nilton Santos, Rio de Janeiro
22 May 2024
19:00

Vitória	1–2	Botafogo
Daniel Júnior 77'	Report	Luiz Henrique 46'; Júnior Santos 61'

Barradão, Salvador
Referee: Rodrigo José Pereira de Lima

Botafogo won 3–1 on aggregate.

2 May 2024
19:00

Águia de Marabá	1–3	São Paulo
Wender 35'		Juan 37', 41'; Gustavo 63'

Mangueirão, Belém
23 May 2024
21:30

São Paulo	2–0	Águia de Marabá
Lucas Moura 35'; Erick 88'	Report

Morumbi, São Paulo
Referee: Marcelo de Lima Henrique

São Paulo won 5–1 on aggregate.

2 May 2024
20:30

CRB	1–0	Ceará
João Neto 90'

Rei Pelé, Maceió
23 May 2024
21:30

Ceará	0–1	CRB
	Report	Gegê 25'

Castelão, Fortaleza
Referee: Bruno Arleu de Araújo

CRB won 2–0 on aggregate.

2 May 2024
21:30

Goiás	1–0	Cuiabá
Galhardo 45+2'

Estádio da Serrinha, Goiânia
23 May 2024
19:30
(18:30 UTC−4)

Cuiabá	1–0	Goiás
Bruno Alves 79'	Report
Penalties
Isidro Pitta (penalty scored); Max (penalty missed); Clayson (penalty missed); Lucas Mineiro (penalty missed)	1–3	(penalty scored) David Braz; (penalty missed) Rafael Gava; (penalty scored) Luiz Henrique; (penalty scored) Wellington

Arena Pantanal, Cuiabá
Referee: Rafael Rodrigo Klein

1–1 on aggregate. Goiás won 3–1 on penalties.

2 May 2024
21:30

Palmeiras	2–1	Botafogo-SP
Rony 57'; Estêvão 90+8'		Brey 90'

Allianz Parque, São Paulo
23 May 2024
19:00

Botafogo-SP	0–0	Palmeiras
	Report

Santa Cruz, Ribeirão Preto
Referee: Anderson Daronco

Palmeiras won 2–1 on aggregate.
