= Zé Carlos (footballer, born 2004) =

Brazilian footballer

Personal information
- Full name: José Carlos de Oliveira
- Date of birth: 9 January 2004 (age 22)
- Place of birth: Itu, Brazil
- Position: Forward

Team information
- Current team: Ituano

Youth career
- 2015–2016: América-SP
- 2016–2022: Ituano

Senior career*
Years	Team	Apps	(Gls)
2022–	Ituano	12	(3)
- * Club domestic league appearances and goals as of 14 June 2024

José Carlos de Oliveira (born 9 January 2004), better known as Zé Carlos, is a Brazilian professional footballer who plays as a forward for Ituano.

== Career ==
With spells in the youth sectors of América de Rio Preto and Ituano, Zé Carlos began his professional career in 2022. He began to gain prominence from the 2024 Campeonato Paulista, when despite Ituano poor campaign, which ended up relegated, he stood out for goals. On 1 April 2024 he suffered a knee injury in a friendly match against Paulista FC.
