= Brendon (footballer, born 2002) =

Brazilian footballer

Personal information
- Full name: Brendon Valença Sobral
- Date of birth: 10 May 2002 (age 24)
- Place of birth: São Paulo, Brazil
- Position: Midfielder

Team information
- Current team: Paysandu (on loan from Nação)

Youth career
- 2011–2019: Corinthians
- 2020–2023: Resende
- 2022–2023: → Botafogo (loan)

Senior career*
Years	Team	Apps	(Gls)
2021–2023	Resende	23	(1)
2024–	Nação	11	(2)
2024–	→ Paysandu (loan)	0	(0)
- * Club domestic league appearances and goals as of 14:50, 8 March 2024 (UTC)

Brendon Valença Sobral (born 10 May 2002), simply known as Brendon, is a Brazilian footballer who plays as a midfielder.

== Club career ==
Born in São Paulo, Brendon played for eight years at Corinthians' youth categories. In 2020, after leaving the club, he joined Resende.

Brendon made his first team debut for Resende on 19 March 2021, coming on as a second-half substitute in a 1–4 Campeonato Carioca away loss against Flamengo. He then returned to the under-20s, but impressed during the 2022 Copa São Paulo de Futebol Júnior and was promoted back to the first team on 20 January 2022.

Regularly used during the 2022 Campeonato Carioca, Brendon moved on loan to Botafogo on 11 April 2022, initially assigned to the under-20 squad.

== Career statistics ==
As of 8 March 2024

Club	Season	League			State League		Cup		Continental		Other		Total	
Club	Season	Division	Apps	Goals	Apps	Goals	Apps	Goals	Apps	Goals	Apps	Goals	Apps	Goals
Resende	2021	Carioca	—		5	0	—		—		4 (Note: Appearance(s) in Copa Rio)	0	9	0
Resende	2022	Carioca	—		13	0	—		—		—		13	0
Resende	2023	Série D	4	0	1	1	—		—		1	0	6	1
Resende	Total		4	0	19	1	—		—		5	0	28	1
Nação	2024	Catarinense	—		11	2	—		—		—		11	2
Paysandu (loan)	2024	Série B	0	0	—		—		—		0	0	0	0
Career total			4	0	30	3	0	0	0	0	5	0	39	3
