= Gazão =

Brazilian footballer (born 2001)

Personal information
- Full name: Gabriel Henrique Lima Santos
- Date of birth: 26 December 2001 (age 24)
- Place of birth: Apucarana, Brazil
- Height: 1.85 m (6 ft 1 in)
- Position: Defensive midfielder

Team information
- Current team: CRB
- Number: 31

Youth career
- 2012–: Grêmio

Senior career*
Years	Team	Apps	(Gls)
2021–2024	Grêmio	2	(0)
2021	→ Pelotas (loan)	3	(0)
2023	→ Avaí (loan)	7	(0)
2024	→ Sampaio Corrêa (loan)	11	(2)
2025–	CRB	4	(0)
- * Club domestic league appearances and goals as of 16 December 2025

Gabriel Henrique Lima Santos (born 26 December 2001), commonly known as Gazão, is a Brazilian professional footballer who plays as a defensive midfielder for CRB.

== Club career ==
=== Grêmio ===
Born in Apucarana, Brazil, Gazão joined the Grêmio's Academy at the age of 10 in 2012.

== Career statistics ==
=== Club ===
As of 26 May 2021.

Appearances and goals by club, season and competition
Club	Season	League			National Cup		Continental		Other		Total	
Club	Season	Division	Apps	Goals	Apps	Goals	Apps	Goals	Apps	Goals	Apps	Goals
Grêmio	2021	Série A	—		—		—		—		0	0
Grêmio	Total		0	0	0	0	0	0	0	0	0	0
Pelotas (loan)	2021	State	—		—		—		3 (Note: Appearance(s) in Campeonato Gaúcho.)	0	3	0
Pelotas (loan)	Total		0	0	0	0	0	0	3	0	3	0
Career total			0	0	0	0	0	0	3	0	3	0
