= Márcio Fernandes (footballer) =

Brazilian football manager and former player

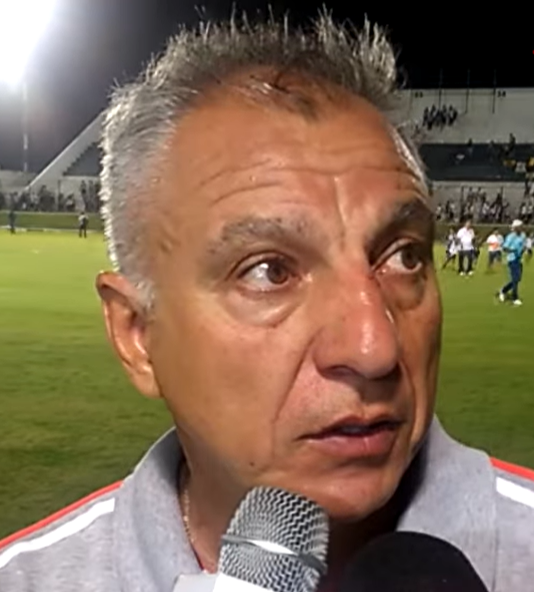
- Fernandes in 2016

Personal information
- Full name: Márcio Fernandes Figueiredo
- Date of birth: 24 March 1962 (age 64)
- Place of birth: Santos, Brazil
- Position: Forward

Youth career
- Santos

Senior career*
Years	Team	Apps	(Gls)
1978–1984	Santos		
1980	→ Botafogo-SP (loan)		
1981	→ Paysandu (loan)		
1983	→ Santo André (loan)		
1984	Taquaritinga		
1985	Santo André		
1986–1987	Ferroviária		
1986	→ Rio Branco-ES (loan)		
1988–1990	XV de Piracicaba		
- Sãocarlense

International career
1983	Brazil U23		

Managerial career
- 1998: Marcílio Dias
- 2001: Sãocarlense
- 2001–2002: Santos (youth)
- 2002: Jabaquara
- 2002–2003: Santos (youth)
- 2004: Bragantino
- 2004–2008: Santos (youth)
- 2004: Santos (interim)
- 2008: Santos (interim)
- 2008: Santos (assistant)
- 2008–2009: Santos
- 2009: Fortaleza
- 2010–2011: Red Bull Brasil
- 2011–2012: Comercial-SP
- 2012–2013: Brasiliense
- 2014: Guarani
- 2015–2016: Vila Nova
- 2016: Botafogo-SP
- 2017: Linense
- 2017: XV de Piracicaba
- 2017: ABC
- 2018: Linense
- 2018: Joinville
- 2019: Aparecidense
- 2019: Remo
- 2020: Brasiliense
- 2020: Treze
- 2020–2021: Vila Nova
- 2021: Santo André
- 2021: Londrina
- 2022–2023: Paysandu
- 2023: Sampaio Corrêa
- 2024: Santo André
- 2024: Vila Nova
- 2024–2025: Paysandu
- 2025: Inter de Limeira
- 2025: Botafogo-PB
- 2025: CSA
- 2025: Paysandu
- 2026: Amazonas
- * Club domestic league appearances and goals

Márcio Fernandes Figueiredo known as Márcio Fernandes (born 24 March 1962) is a Brazilian professional football coach and former player who played as a forward.

== Playing career ==
Born in Santos, São Paulo, Fernandes was a youth graduate of hometown side Santos FC, and was a part of the squad which won the 1978 Campeonato Paulista. He subsequently served loan stints at Botafogo-SP, Paysandu and Santo André, and won the 1983 Toulon Tournament with the Brazil under-23 national team before returning to Peixe in 1984.

After a short stint at Taquaritinga and another year back at Santo André, Fernandes signed for Ferroviária for the 1986 season, but finished the year at Rio Branco-ES. In 1988, he joined XV de Piracicaba, and retired from professional football after a period at Sãocarlense in the 1990s.

== Coaching career ==
After starting it out at Marcílio Dias in 1998, Fernandes was named head coach of Sãocarlense in April 2001, before taking over the youth sides of his first club Santos later in the year. In 2002, after Santos established a partnership with Jabaquara, he was named head coach of the club, and won the Campeonato Paulista Série B3 with the club.

After returning to the youth sides of Peixe, Fernandes was named at the helm of Bragantino in January 2004. After leaving in April, he subsequently returned to Santos, being named interim head coach of the main squad on 7 May.

Fernandes led Santos in one match, a 2–1 win over Juventude, before coaching a B-team to the Copa FPF title later in the year. On 28 May 2008, he was again named interim after Emerson Leão was sacked, and was in charge in a 0–0 draw against São Paulo before becoming an assistant of Cuca.

On 7 August 2008, Fernandes was named permanent head coach of Peixe, after Cuca resigned. Despite narrowly avoiding relegation, he was dismissed on 13 February of the following year, after a poor start of the new season.

On 20 August 2009, Fernandes was appointed Fortaleza head coach, but left the club nearly one month later, after just four points in seven matches. He took over Red Bull Brasil in December, winning the 2010 Campeonato Paulista Série A3 but being sacked in January 2011 after three consecutive defeats.

On 23 February 2011, Fernandes was named Comercial-SP head coach, and led the club to a promotion in the 2011 Paulista Série A2. On 27 February 2012, after a poor start in the 2012 Campeonato Paulista, he was relieved from his duties.

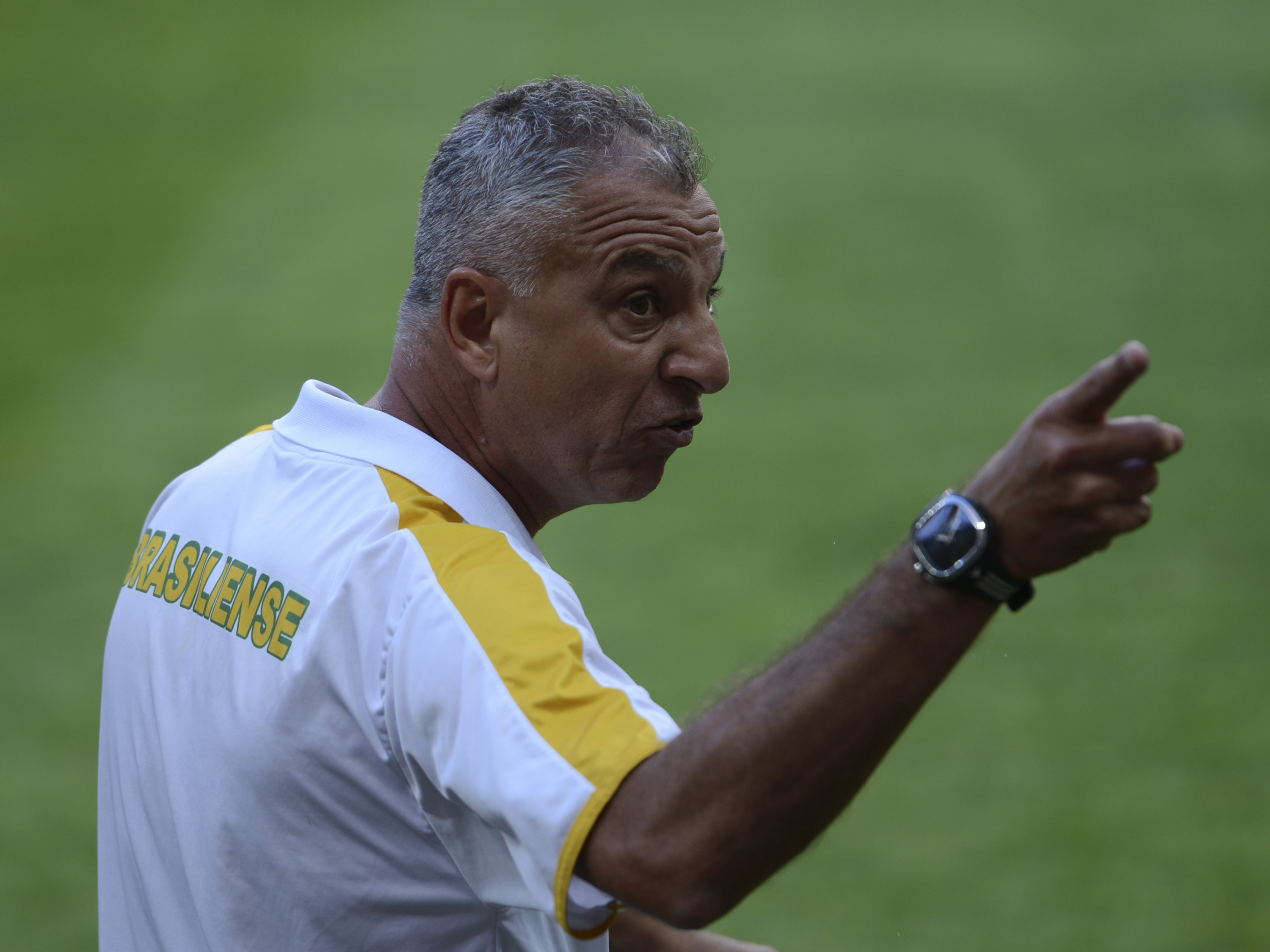
Fernandes as head coach of Brasiliense in 2013

On 3 September 2012, Fernandes took over Série C side Brasiliense. He avoided relegation with the club, but left on 10 June 2013; with 276 days in charge, he became the longest serving coach of the club's history at the time.

On 14 November 2013, Guarani confirmed the signing of Fernandes as head coach for the upcoming campaign. After failing to achieve promotion in the 2014 Paulista Série A2 and being knocked out of the 2014 Copa do Brasil, he resigned on 11 April of that year.

On 25 February 2015, after nearly one year unemployed, Fernandes was named Vila Nova head coach. He left the club exactly one year later, after winning the 2015 Campeonato Goiano Segunda Divisão and the 2015 Série C, and was presented at Botafogo-SP four days later.

Sacked by Botafogo on 11 October 2016, Fernandes was announced at Linense the following 20 February 2017. On 26 April, he returned to XV de Piracicaba, now as head coach, but left for ABC on 19 July; at the latter club, he was dismissed after only 30 days in charge.

Fernandes returned to Linense on 6 February 2018, but left the club in March after suffering relegation in the 2018 Campeonato Paulista. On 15 May, he was named head coach of Joinville, but was sacked on 16 July.

On 2 October 2018, Fernandes agreed to become Aparecidense's head coach for the 2019 season, but asked to leave the club the following 31 January, after only four matches. On 25 February 2019, he was announced at Remo, but was dismissed on 26 August, after the club's elimination from the 2019 Série C.

On 17 February 2020, Fernandes returned to Brasiliense, but was sacked on 31 August. He was named Treze head coach on 22 September, but despite failing to avoid their relegation in the third level, he took over fellow league team Vila Nova and led the club to promotion as champions.

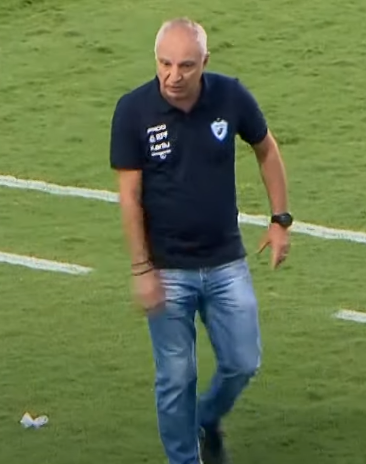
Fernandes coaching Londrina in 2021

Sacked by Vila on 5 March 2021, Fernandes was appointed Santo André head coach on 28 April. He left after avoiding relegation from the 2021 Paulistão, and was named at the helm of Londrina on 14 July; he left the latter at the end of the year.

On 3 December 2021, Fernandes was announced at Paysandu, and remained more than a year in charge of the club before being dismissed on 29 April 2023. On 7 May 2023, he took over Série B side Sampaio Corrêa, but was sacked on 5 September.

On 6 February 2024, Fernandes was announced back at Santo André. After suffering relegation in the 2024 Campeonato Paulista, he returned to Vila for a third spell on 18 March, but was dismissed on 22 May, after a 6–0 loss to former side Paysandu in the first leg of the 2024 Copa Verde finals.

On 9 September 2024, Fernandes returned to Paysandu for his second spell. Dismissed the following 9 February, he took over Inter de Limeira two days later.

After failing to avoid relegation from the 2025 Campeonato Paulista, Fernandes left the club, and took over Botafogo-PB on 12 May of that year. On 2 July, he was himself sacked, and was named at the helm of fellow third division side CSA late in the month.

On 12 August 2025, Fernandes left CSA by mutual consent, and returned to Paysandu on 9 September, exactly seven months after his sacking. On 3 November, after another relegation, he was dismissed.

On 5 January 2026, Fernandes was announced as head coach of Amazonas in the third division. On 13 March, after being knocked out from the 2026 Copa do Brasil, he was sacked.

== Coaching statistics ==
As of 13 August 2025

Coaching record by team and tenure
Team	Nat	From	To	Record								Ref
Team	Nat	From	To	G	W	D	L	GF	GA	GD	Win %	Ref
Marcílio Dias	(Brazil)	25 March 1998	26 April 1998	9	1	4	4	6	10	−4	11.11	
Sãocarlense	(Brazil)	10 January 2001	1 July 2001	30	7	9	14	41	52	−11	23.33	
Jabaquara	(Brazil)	30 June 2002	30 October 2002	18	15	3	0	53	10	+43	83.33	
Bragantino	(Brazil)	1 January 2004	5 April 2004	14	2	3	9	13	23	−10	14.29	
Santos (interim)	(Brazil)	7 May 2004	8 May 2004	1	1	0	0	2	1	+1	100.00	
Santos (interim)	(Brazil)	28 May 2008	28 May 2008	1	0	1	0	0	0	+0	0.00	
Santos	(Brazil)	7 August 2008	13 February 2009	27	10	8	9	31	30	+1	37.04	
Fortaleza	(Brazil)	20 August 2009	19 September 2009	7	1	1	5	11	13	−2	14.29	
Red Bull Brasil	(Brazil)	1 January 2010	30 March 2011	71	37	18	16	113	70	+43	52.11	
Comercial-SP	(Brazil)	1 June 2011	16 April 2012	45	15	11	19	48	57	−9	33.33	
Brasiliense	(Brazil)	3 September 2012	10 June 2013	29	16	6	7	36	27	+9	55.17	
Shanghai Shenxin	(China)	14 June 2013	13 November 2013	20	8	3	9	15	21	−6	40.00	
Guarani	(Brazil)	14 November 2013	11 April 2014	21	5	8	8	23	25	−2	23.81	
Vila Nova	(Brazil)	25 February 2015	25 February 2016	44	26	10	8	69	32	+37	59.09	
Linense	(Brazil)	20 February 2017	10 April 2017	8	4	2	2	11	11	+0	50.00	
Linense	(Brazil)	7 February 2018	21 March 2018	7	1	4	2	10	11	−1	14.29	
Vila Nova	(Brazil)	18 December 2020	5 March 2021	17	10	3	4	30	15	+15	58.82	
Londrina	(Brazil)	16 July 2021	1 December 2021	29	10	9	10	26	30	−4	34.48	
Paysandu	(Brazil)	20 January 2022	3 May 2023	66	34	16	16	103	64	+39	51.52	
Sampaio Corrêa	(Brazil)	10 May 2023	11 September 2023	22	4	11	7	13	20	−7	18.18	
Santo André	(Brazil)	7 February 2024	18 March 2024	7	1	3	3	6	11	−5	14.29	
Vila Nova	(Brazil)	19 March 2024	23 May 2024	14	6	1	7	16	23	−7	42.86	
Paysandu	(Brazil)	9 September 2024	10 February 2025	14	7	2	5	17	15	+2	50.00	
Inter de Limeira	(Brazil)	12 February 2025	12 March 2025	5	0	2	3	3	10	−7	0.00	
Botafogo-PB	(Brazil)	13 May 2025	2 July 2025	6	1	1	4	5	9	−4	16.67	
CSA	(Brazil)	28 July 2025	12 August 2025	4	1	1	2	3	5	−2	25.00	
Paysandu	(Brazil)	9 September 2025	3 November 2025	10	1	3	6	11	15	−4	10.00	
Amazonas	(Brazil)	5 January 2026	13 March 2026	12	4	6	2	12	7	+5	33.33	
Total				572	234	150	188	743	640	+103	40.91	—

== Honours ==
=== Player ===
Santos

- Campeonato Paulista: 1978

Paysandu

- Campeonato Paraense: 1981

Brazil U23

- Toulon Tournament: 1983

=== Coach ===
Jabaquara

- Campeonato Paulista Série B3: 2002

Santos B

- Copa FPF: 2004

Red Bull Brasil

- Campeonato Paulista Série A3: 2010

Brasiliense

- Campeonato Brasiliense: 2013

Vila Nova

- Campeonato Goiano Segunda Divisão: 2015
- Campeonato Brasileiro Série C: 2015, 2020

Remo

- Campeonato Paraense: 2019

Paysandu

- Copa Verde: 2022
