= 2024 Mirassol Futebol Clube season =

Mirassol
2024 season
- Manager: Mozart
- Stadium: Estádio José Maria de Campos Maia
- Campeonato Brasileiro Série B: 2nd (promoted)
- Campeonato Paulista: First stage
- Top goalscorer: League: Dellatorre (10); All: Dellatorre (17)

The 2024 season was the 99th year for Mirassol Football Club. The team participated in the Campeonato Brasileiro Série B and the Campeonato Paulista, achieving promotion to the top flight for the first time in their history.

== Transfers ==
=== In ===
Pos.	Player	Transferred from	Fee	Date	Source
FW	(Brazil) Dellatorre	Unattached	Free	11 January 2024	
MF	(Brazil) Rodrigo Andrade	(Brazil) Vitória	Loan	18 July 2024	
FW	(Brazil) João Pedro	(Brazil) Cruzeiro	Loan	18 July 2024	
GK	(Brazil) Thomazella	(Brazil) Portuguesa	Loan	29 August 2024	
DF	(Brazil) Da Silva	(Brazil) Aparecidense	Undisclosed	2 September 2024	
FW	(Brazil) Cristian Renato	(Brazil) Figueirense	Loan return	2 September 2024	
FW	(Brazil) Rafael Silva	(Brazil) Inter de Limeira	Loan return	30 September 2024	

=== Out ===
Pos.	Player	Transferred to	Fee	Date	Source
FW	(Brazil) Cristian Renato	(Brazil) Figueirense	Loan	5 April 2024	
FW	(Brazil) Rafael Silva	(Brazil) Inter de Limeira	Loan	15 January 2024	

== Competitions ==
=== Overall record ===
Competition	First match	Last match	Starting round	Final position	Record							
Competition	First match	Last match	Starting round	Final position	Pld	W	D	L	GF	GA	GD	Win %
Campeonato Brasileiro Série B	24 April 2024	24 November 2024	Matchday 1	2nd	38	19	10	9	42	26	+16	50.00
Campeonato Paulista	21 January 2024	10 March 2024	First stage	First stage	12	3	5	4	17	17	+0	25.00
Total					50	22	15	13	59	43	+16	44.00

Last updated: 15 September 2024
Source: Soccerway

=== Campeonato Brasileiro Série B ===
==== League table ====
Pos	Team	Pld	W	D	L	GF	GA	GD	Pts	Promotion or relegation
1	Santos (C, P)	38	20	8	10	57	32	+25	68	Promotion to 2025 Campeonato Brasileiro Série A
2	Mirassol (P)	38	19	10	9	42	26	+16	67	Promotion to 2025 Campeonato Brasileiro Série A
3	Sport (P)	38	19	9	10	57	37	+20	66	Promotion to 2025 Campeonato Brasileiro Série A
4	Ceará (P)	38	19	7	12	59	41	+18	64	Promotion to 2025 Campeonato Brasileiro Série A
5	Novorizontino	38	18	10	10	43	31	+12	64	

Source: CBF
Rules for classification: 1) points; 2) wins; 3) goal difference; 4) goals scored; 5) head-to-head results (only between 2 teams); 6) fewest red cards; 7) fewest yellow cards; 8) drawing of lots.
(C) Champions; (P) Promoted

==== Results summary ====
Overall								Home						Away					
Pld	W	D	L	GF	GA	GD	Pts	W	D	L	GF	GA	GD	W	D	L	GF	GA	GD
38	19	10	9	42	26	+16	67	14	4	1	27	6	+21	5	6	8	15	20	−5

Source: Worldfootball

==== Results by round ====
Round	1	2	3	4	5	6	7	8	9	10	11	12	13	14	15	16	17	18	19	20	21	22	23	24	25	26	27	28	29	30	31	32	33	34	35	36	37	38
Ground	A	H	A	H	A	H	A	H	H	A	A	H	A	H	A	A	H	H	A	H	A	H	A	H	A	H	A	A	H	H	A	H	A	H	H	A	A	H
Result	L	W	D	W	D	W	L	W	W	L	L	D	D	W	L	W	D	W	W	W	W	L	D	W	L	D	L	W	D	W	L	W	W	W	W	D	D	W
Position	17	10	11	7	9	5	8	6	3	6	8	9	10	6	8	7	7	4	3	3	1	3	3	2	3	3	5	4	4	4	4	4	4	4	3	2	2	2

Source: Worldfootball
A = Away; H = Home; W = Win; D = Draw; L = Loss

==== Matches ====
23 April 2024 1	Brusque	3–1	Mirassol
21:00 UTC−3

29 April 2024 2	Mirassol	3–2	Ceará
20:30 UTC−3

7 May 2024 3	Botafogo-SP	0–0	Mirassol
21:00 UTC−3

12 May 2024 4	Mirassol	2–1	Paysandu
16:00 UTC−3

15 May 2024 5	América Mineiro	0–0	Mirassol
19:00 UTC−3

19 May 2024 6	Mirassol	2–0	Ituano
16:00 UTC−3

28 May 2024 7	Amazonas	1–0	Mirassol
18:00 UTC−4

4 June 2024 8	Mirassol	3–0	Guarani
19:00 UTC−3

11 June 2024 9	Mirassol	1–0	Goiás
19:00 UTC−3

16 June 2024 10	Sport	1–0	Mirassol
18:30 UTC−3

20 June 2024 11	Vila Nova	1–0	Mirassol
19:00 UTC−3

25 June 2024 12	Mirassol	0–0	Santos
19:00 UTC−3

2 July 2024 13	Novorizontino	1–1	Mirassol
20:00 UTC−3

9 July 2024 14	Mirassol	1–0	CRB
21:00 UTC−3

13 July 2024 15	Ponte Preta	4–2	Mirassol
--:-- UTC−3

20 July 2024 16	Coritiba	0–1	Mirassol
--:-- UTC−3

24 July 2024 17	Mirassol	0–0	Avaí
--:-- UTC−3

27 July 2024 18	Mirassol	1–0	Operário Ferroviário
--:-- UTC−3

5 August 2024 19	Chapecoense	0–1	Mirassol
--:-- UTC−3

10 August 2024 20	Mirassol	2–0	Brusque
--:-- UTC−3

17 August 2024 21	Ceará	1–2	Mirassol
--:-- UTC−3

22 August 2024 22	Mirassol	1–2	Botafogo-SP
--:-- UTC−3

26 August 2024 23	Paysandu	0–0	Mirassol
--:-- UTC−3

4 September 2024 24	Mirassol	1–0	América Mineiro
--:-- UTC−3

7 September 2024 25	Ituano	3–2	Mirassol
--:-- UTC−3

14 September 2024 26	Mirassol	0–0	Amazonas
--:-- UTC−3

18 September 2024 27	Guarani	1–0	Mirassol
--:-- UTC−3

21 September 2024 28	Goiás	0–1	Mirassol
--:-- UTC−3

29 September 2024 29	Mirassol	0–0	Sport
--:-- UTC−3

5 October 2024 30	Mirassol	1–0	Vila Nova
--:-- UTC−3

12 October 2024 31	Santos	3–2	Mirassol
--:-- UTC−3

19 October 2024 32	Mirassol	1–0	Novorizontino
--:-- UTC−3

23 October 2024 33	CRB	0–1	Mirassol
--:-- UTC−3

26 October 2024 34	Mirassol	3–0	Ponte Preta
--:-- UTC−3

6 November 2024 35	Mirassol	4–1	Coritiba
--:-- UTC−3

10 November 2024 36	Avaí	0–0	Mirassol
--:-- UTC−3

15 November 2024 37	Operário Ferroviário	1–1	Mirassol
--:-- UTC−3

24 November 2024 38	Mirassol	1–0	Chapecoense
--:-- UTC−3

=== Campeonato Paulista ===
==== First stage ====
21 January 2024 1	Ponte Preta	1–1	Mirassol

23 January 2024 2	Mirassol	1–1	São Paulo

28 January 2024 3	Mirassol	1–1	Novorizontino

1 February 2024 4	Guarani	2–3	Mirassol

3 February 2024 5	Água Santa	2–1	Mirassol

8 February 2024 6	Mirassol	4–0	Santo André

11 February 2024 7	Mirassol	2–2	Santos

14 February 2024 8	Ituano	1–1	Mirassol

17 February 2024 9	Mirassol	2–1	Botafogo-SP	Mirassol
				Stadium: Estádio José Maria de Campos Maia; Referee: Lucas Canetto Bellote

24 February 2024 10	Palmeiras	3–1	Mirassol	Barueri
				Stadium: Arena Barueri; Referee: Edina Alves Batista

2 March 2024 11	Portuguesa	1–0	Mirassol	São Paulo
				Stadium: Estádio do Canindé; Referee: João Gobi

10 March 2024 12	Mirassol	0–2	São Bernardo	Mirassol
				Stadium: Estádio José Maria de Campos Maia; Referee: Vinicius Gonçalves Dias Araujo
