= Emiliano Rodríguez (footballer) =

Uruguayan footballer (born 2003)

Personal information
- Full name: Emiliano Rodríguez Rosales
- Date of birth: 16 July 2003 (age 23)
- Place of birth: Montevideo, Uruguay
- Height: 1.90 m (6 ft 3 in)
- Position: Forward

Team information
- Current team: Cerro
- Number: 14

Youth career
- Bella Vista
- 2021: Boston River

Senior career*
Years	Team	Apps	(Gls)
2022–2025	Boston River	39	(2)
2024	→ Atlético Goianiense (loan)	36	(8)
2025	Deportivo Cali	14	(3)
2025	Aldosivi	5	(0)
2026	Londrina	7	(0)
2026–	Cerro	6	(1)

International career
2022–2023	Uruguay U20	15	(2)
2023	Uruguay U23	3	(1)
Medal record
Men's football
Representing Uruguay
South American U-20 Championship
Runner-up	2023 Colombia
- * Club domestic league appearances and goals as of 17:35, 28 September 2026

Emiliano Rodríguez Rosales (born 16 July 2003) is a Uruguayan professional footballer who plays as forward for Cerro.

== Club career ==
Born in Montevideo, Rodríguez joined Boston River's youth setup in 2021, from Bella Vista. He made his first team – and Primera División – debut on 5 February 2022, coming on as a late substitute for Martín Fernández in a 0–0 home draw against Plaza Colonia.

Rodríguez scored his first senior goal on 8 May 2022, netting a last-minute winner in a 1–0 away success over Rentistas. On 24 January 2024, after featuring more sparingly, he moved to Campeonato Brasileiro Série A side Atlético Goianiense on a one-year loan deal, with a buyout clause.

== International career ==
Rodríguez represented Uruguay at under-20 level in the 2023 South American U-20 Championship (along with his brother), and at under-23 level in the 2023 Pan American Games.

== Personal life ==
Rodríguez's twin brother Luciano is also a footballer and a forward.

== Career statistics ==
As of 29 January 2024

Club	Season	League			Cup		Continental		State league		Other		Total	
Club	Season	Division	Apps	Goals	Apps	Goals	Apps	Goals	Apps	Goals	Apps	Goals	Apps	Goals
Boston River	2022	Primera División	25	2	1	0	—		—		—		26	2
Boston River	2023	Primera División	14	0	0	0	1 (Note: Appearance(s) in Copa Libertadores)	0	—		—		15	0
Boston River	Total		39	2	1	0	1	0	—		—		41	2
Atlético Goianiense (loan)	2024	Série A	0	0	0	0	—		0	0	—		0	0
Career total			39	2	1	0	1	0	0	0	0	0	41	2
