= 2023 Copa Verde finals =

- Event: 2023 Copa Verde
| Paysandu | Goiás |
| (Pará) | (Goiás) |
| 1 | 4 |
- on aggregate

First leg
| Paysandu | Goiás |
| 0 | 2 |
- Date: 17 May 2023
- Venue: Mangueirão, Belém
- Referee: Alisson Sidnei Furtado
- Attendance: 13,607

Second leg
| Goiás | Paysandu |
| 2 | 1 |
- Date: 31 May 2023
- Venue: Estádio da Serrinha, Goiânia
- Referee: Dyorgines José Padovani de Andrade
- Attendance: 11,499

The 2023 Copa Verde finals was the final two-legged tie that decided the 2023 Copa Verde, the 10th season of the Copa Verde, Brazil's regional cup football tournament organised by the Brazilian Football Confederation.

The finals were contested in a two-legged home-and-away format between Paysandu, from Pará, and Goiás, from Goiás.

Goiás defeated Paysandu 4–1 on aggregate to win their first Copa Verde title.

== Teams ==
| Team | Previous finals appearances (bold indicates winners) |
|---|---|
| (Pará) Paysandu | 6 (2014, **2016**, 2017, **2018**, 2019, **2022**) |
| Goiás | None |

=== Road to the final ===
Note: In all scores below, the score of the finalist is given first.

| (Pará) Paysandu | | | Round | Goiás | | |
|---|---|---|---|---|---|---|
| Opponent | Venue | Score | | Opponent | Venue | Score |
| Bye | | | First round | Bye | | |
| (Rondônia) Real Ariquemes | Home | 3–0 | Round of 16 | (Mato Grosso) União Rondonópolis | Home | 3–0 |
| (Amazonas (Brazilian state)) Princesa do Solimões (tied 0–0 on aggregate, won 5–3 on penalties) | Away | 0–0 | Quarter-finals | (Federal District (Brazil)) Brasiliense (won 1–0 on aggregate) | Away | 0–0 |
| (Amazonas (Brazilian state)) Princesa do Solimões (tied 0–0 on aggregate, won 5–3 on penalties) | Home | 0–0 | Quarter-finals | (Federal District (Brazil)) Brasiliense (won 1–0 on aggregate) | Home | 1–0 |
| (Pará) Remo (tied 2–2 on aggregate, won 4–2 on penalties) | Neutral | 0–1 | Semi-finals | (Mato Grosso) Cuiabá (won 2–1 on aggregate) | Away | 0–1 |
| (Pará) Remo (tied 2–2 on aggregate, won 4–2 on penalties) | Neutral | 2–1 | Semi-finals | (Mato Grosso) Cuiabá (won 2–1 on aggregate) | Home | 2–0 |

== Format ==
The finals were played on a home-and-away two-legged basis. If tied on aggregate, the penalty shoot-out was used to determine the winner.

== Matches ==
=== First leg ===
17 May 2023
20:00 BRT (UTC−3)

| Paysandu (Pará) | 0–2 | Goiás |
|---|---|---|
| | Report | Maguinho 55'; Philippe 87' |

Mangueirão, Belém
Attendance: 13,607
Referee: Alisson Sidnei Furtado (Tocantins)

| **Paysandu** | **Goiás** |

| GK | 40 | (Brazil) Gabriel Bernard | (yellow card) 45+4' |
| DF | 16 | (Brazil) João Vieira | (yellow card) 45' |
| DF | 4 | (Brazil) Wanderson |
| DF | 30 | (Brazil) Genílson | (yellow card) 51' |
| DF | 31 | (Brazil) Naylhor | (yellow card) 54' |
| DF | 6 | (Brazil) Eltinho |
| MF | 5 | (Brazil) Paulo Henrique | | (substituted off) 71' |
| MF | 36 | (Brazil) Gabriel Davis |
| MF | 11 | (Brazil) Fernando Gabriel (c) | | (substituted off) 61' |
| FW | 25 | (Brazil) Bruno Alves | (yellow card) 67' | (substituted off) 88' |
| FW | 9 | (Brazil) Mário Sérgio |
Substitutes:
| GK | 23 | (Brazil) Cláudio Vitor |
| DF | 13 | (Brazil) Iarley |
| DF | 39 | (Brazil) Juan Pitbull |
| MF | 3 | (Brazil) Rikelton |
| MF | 34 | (Brazil) Eric |
| MF | 38 | (Brazil) João Pedro | | (substituted in) 71' |
| FW | 8 | (Brazil) Dalberto | | (substituted in) 61' |
| FW | 20 | (Brazil) Vicente |
| FW | 28 | (Brazil) Alex Matos |
| FW | 37 | (Brazil) Roger | | (substituted in) 88' |
Coach:
(Brazil) Marquinhos Santos

| GK | 88 | (Brazil) Marcelo Rangel |
| DF | 13 | (Brazil) Bruno Santos | (yellow card) 45' | (substituted off) 46' |
| DF | 3 | (Brazil) Lucas Halter (c) |
| DF | 19 | (Brazil) Bruno Melo |
| DF | 66 | (Brazil) Hugo | | (substituted off) 90' |
| MF | 5 | (Brazil) Zé Ricardo |
| MF | 12 | (Brazil) Willian Oliveira |
| MF | 2 | (Brazil) Maguinho |
| MF | 10 | (Argentina) Julián Palacios | | (substituted off) 73' |
| FW | 27 | (Brazil) Alesson | | (substituted off) 81' |
| FW | 17 | (Brazil) Matheus Peixoto | | (substituted off) 81' |
Substitutes:
| GK | 23 | (Brazil) Tadeu |
| GK | 94 | (Brazil) Matheus Alves |
| DF | 4 | (Brazil) Sidimar |
| DF | 6 | (Brazil) Sander | | (substituted in) 90' |
| DF | 43 | (Brazil) Edu |
| MF | 15 | (Brazil) Felipe Ferreira | | (substituted in) 46' |
| MF | 25 | (Brazil) Simioni |
| MF | 26 | (Brazil) Nathan Melo |
| FW | 11 | (Brazil) Diego Gonçalves | | (substituted in) 73' |
| FW | 18 | (Brazil) Wendell | | (substituted in) 81' |
| FW | 90 | (Brazil) Philippe | | (substituted in) 81' |
Coach:
(Brazil) Emerson Ávila

Assistant referees:
Cipriano da Silva Sousa (Tocantins)
Fábio Pereira (Tocantins)
Fourth official:
Marcos Mateus de Sousa (Tocantins)
Fifth official:
Acácio Menezes Leão (Pará)
Video assistant referee:
Thiago Duarte Peixoto (São Paulo)
Assistant video assistant referees:
Ciro Chaban Junqueira (Distrito Federal)
Rodrigo Batista Raposo (Distrito Federal)

=== Second leg ===
31 May 2023
20:00 BRT (UTC−3)

| Goiás | 2–1 | (Pará) Paysandu |
|---|---|---|
| Vinícius 6' (pen.); Matheus Peixoto 38' (pen.) | Report | Bruno Melo 54' (o.g.) |

Estádio da Serrinha, Goiânia
Attendance: 11,499
Referee: Dyorgines José Padovani de Andrade (Espírito Santo)

| **Goiás** | **Paysandu** |

| GK | 23 | (Brazil) Tadeu (c) |
| DF | 13 | (Brazil) Bruno Santos |
| DF | 3 | (Brazil) Lucas Halter |
| DF | 19 | (Brazil) Bruno Melo |
| DF | 66 | (Brazil) Hugo |
| MF | 25 | (Brazil) Simioni | | (substituted off) 69' |
| MF | 5 | (Brazil) Zé Ricardo | (yellow card) 47' |
| MF | 2 | (Brazil) Maguinho |
| MF | 10 | (Argentina) Julián Palacios | (yellow card) 9' | (substituted off) 69' |
| FW | 7 | (Brazil) Vinícius | | (substituted off) 86' |
| FW | 17 | (Brazil) Matheus Peixoto | | (substituted off) 78' |
Substitutes:
| GK | 88 | (Brazil) Marcelo Rangel |
| DF | 4 | (Brazil) Sidimar |
| DF | 6 | (Brazil) Sander |
| DF | 22 | (Brazil) Apodi | (yellow card) 90+1' | (substituted in) 69' |
| DF | 43 | (Brazil) Edu |
| MF | 8 | (Brazil) Fellipe Bastos |
| MF | 26 | (Brazil) Nathan Melo |
| MF | 77 | (Brazil) Jhonny Lucas | (yellow card) 90+4' | (substituted in) 69' |
| FW | 11 | (Brazil) Diego Gonçalves |
| FW | 27 | (Brazil) Alesson | | (substituted in) 86' |
| FW | 90 | (Brazil) Philippe |
| FW | 99 | (Brazil) Gabriel Novaes | | (substituted in) 78' |
Coach:
(Brazil) Emerson Ávila

| GK | 40 | (Brazil) Gabriel Bernard |
| DF | 30 | (Brazil) Genílson |
| DF | 4 | (Brazil) Wanderson |
| DF | 31 | (Brazil) Naylhor (c) | (yellow card) 2' |
| MF | 16 | (Brazil) João Vieira | (yellow card) 90+2' | (substituted off) 86' |
| MF | 36 | (Brazil) Gabriel Davis |
| MF | 20 | (Brazil) Vicente | (yellow card) 56' | (substituted off) 69' |
| MF | 37 | (Brazil) Roger | | (substituted off) 46' |
| MF | 11 | (Brazil) Fernando Gabriel | (yellow card) 11' | (substituted off) 69' |
| FW | 39 | (Brazil) Bruno Alves | | (substituted off) 78' |
| FW | 9 | (Brazil) Mário Sérgio | (yellow card) 85' |
Substitutes:
| GK | 23 | (Brazil) Cláudio Vitor |
| DF | 13 | (Brazil) Iarley | | (substituted in) 86' |
| DF | 25 | (Brazil) Juan Pitbull | | (substituted in) 69' |
| MF | 5 | (Brazil) Paulo Henrique | (red card) 88' | (substituted in) 69' |
| MF | 34 | (Brazil) Eric | | (substituted in) 78' |
| FW | 8 | (Brazil) Dalberto | | (substituted in) 46' |
| FW | 28 | (Brazil) Alex Matos |
Coach:
(Brazil) Marquinhos Santos

Assistant referees:
Fabiano da Silva Ramires (Espírito Santo)
Vanderson Antônio Zanotti (Espírito Santo)
Fourth official:
Arthur Gomes Rabelo (Espírito Santo)
Fifth official:
Tiego Henrique dos Santos Braga (Goiás)
Video assistant referee:
Rodrigo Carvalhaes de Miranda (Rio de Janeiro)
Assistant video assistant referees:
Frederico Soares Vilarinho (Minas Gerais)
Maguielson Lima Barbosa (Distrito Federal)

== See also ==
- 2024 Copa do Brasil
