= 2023 Campeonato Goiano =

Campeonato Goiano
- Season: 2023
- Dates: 11 January – 9 April
- Champions: Atlético Goianiense
- Relegated: Grêmio Anápolis; Inhumas
- Copa do Brasil: Aparecidense; Atlético Goianiense; Goiás
- Série D: Anápolis; CRAC; Iporá
- Matches: 80
- Goals: 208 (2.6 per match)
- Top goalscorer: Nicolas (7 goals)
- All statistics correct as of 9 April 2023.

The 2023 Campeonato Goiano (officially the GOIANÃO 1XBET 2023 for sponsorship reasons) was the 80th edition of Goiás's top professional football league organized by FGF. The competition began on 11 January and ended on 9 April 2023.

The competition counted with the participation of Inhumas and Goiânia (teams promoted from the 2022 Campeonato Goiano da Divisão de Acesso) that occupied the places of the 2022 relegated teams.

Atlético Goianiense are the defending champions.

== Participating teams ==
Club	Home city	Manager
Anápolis	Anápolis	Luiz Carlos Winck
Aparecidense	Aparecida de Goiânia	Moacir Júnior
Atlético Goianiense	Goiânia	Mozart
CRAC	Catalão	Paulo Massaro
Goianésia	Goianésia	Sílvio Criciúma
Goiânia	Goiânia	Alex Sandro (caretaker)
Goiás	Goiânia	Guto Ferreira
Grêmio Anápolis	Anápolis	Glauber Ramos
Inhumas	Inhumas	Augusto Fassina
Iporá	Iporá	Edson Miolo
Morrinhos	Morrinhos	João Dreison
Vila Nova	Goiânia	Claudinei Oliveira

== Format ==
In the first stage, each team will play the other eleven teams in a single round-robin tournament. The teams will be ranked according to points. If tied on points, the following criteria will be used to determine the ranking: 1. Wins; 2. Goal difference; 3. Goals scored; 4. Head-to-head points (only between two teams) 5. Fewest red cards; 6. Fewest yellow cards; 7. Draw. These criteria (except 4) will also be used to determine the overall performance in the final stages. The top eight teams will advance to the quarter-finals while the bottom two teams will be relegated to 2024 Campeonato Goiano da Divisão de Acesso.

The final stages will be played on a home-and-away two-legged basis. For the semi-finals and finals the best overall performance team will host the second leg. If the score is level, a penalty shoot-out will be used to determine the winners.

Champions will qualify for the 2024 Copa do Brasil and 2024 Copa Verde, while runners-up and third place will qualify for the 2024 Copa do Brasil. Top three teams not already qualified for 2024 Série A, Série B or Série C qualified for 2024 Campeonato Brasileiro Série D.

== First stage ==
=== Group A ===
Pos	Team	Pld	W	D	L	GF	GA	GD	Pts	Qualification or relegation
1	Goiás	11	8	2	1	20	8	+12	26	Advance to Quarter-finals
2	Atlético Goianiense	11	8	1	2	25	13	+12	25	Advance to Quarter-finals
3	Vila Nova	11	5	5	1	16	5	+11	20	Advance to Quarter-finals
4	CRAC	11	5	3	3	17	11	+6	18	Advance to Quarter-finals
5	Aparecidense	11	5	2	4	11	10	+1	17	Advance to Quarter-finals
6	Anápolis	11	3	6	2	12	8	+4	15	Advance to Quarter-finals
7	Iporá	11	4	2	5	13	14	−1	14	Advance to Quarter-finals
8	Goiânia	11	4	2	5	11	22	−11	14	Advance to Quarter-finals
9	Goianésia	11	4	1	6	9	15	−6	13	
10	Morrinhos	11	2	2	7	13	18	−5	8	
11	Grêmio Anápolis (R)	11	1	4	6	11	21	−10	7	Relegation to the Divisão de Acesso
12	Inhumas (R)	11	1	2	8	8	21	−13	5	Relegation to the Divisão de Acesso

Source: FGF
(R) Relegated

== Final stage ==
=== Bracket ===
Quarter-finals
Aparecidense	3	0	3
CRAC	0	1	1
Iporá	0	1	1
Atlético Goianiense	1	7	8
Anápolis	0	1	1
Vila Nova	0	0	0
Goiânia	3	0	3
Goiás	8	2	10

Semi-finals
Aparecidense	1	0	1
Atlético Goianiense	2	2	4
Anápolis	0	0	0
Goiás	1	3	4

Finals
Atlético Goianiense (p)	2	1	3 (5)
Goiás	0	3	3 (4)

=== Quarter-finals ===
Team 1	Agg.	Team 2	1st leg	2nd leg
Goiânia	3–10	Goiás	3–8	0–2
Iporá	1–8	Atlético Goianiense	0–1	1–7
Anápolis	1–0	Vila Nova	0–0	1–0
Aparecidense	3–1	CRAC	3–0	0–1

==== Group B ====
25 February 2023
16:00

Goiânia	3–8	Goiás
Assuério 41'; Nilson Júnior 48'; Wallace 74'	Report	Nicolas 2', 82'; Lucas Halter 14'; Vinícius 51'; Kauan 56'; Bruno Melo 60', 65'; Philippe Costa 90+3'

Estádio Serra Dourada, Goiânia
Attendance: 13,269
Referee: Osimar Moreira da Silva Júnior

5 March 2023
16:00

Goiás	2–0	Goiânia
	Report

Estádio da Serrinha, Goiânia

Goiás advanced to the semi-finals

==== Group C ====
25 February 2023
15:30

Iporá	0–1	Atlético Goianiense
	Report	Daniel 64'

Estádio Municipal Francisco José Ferreira, Iporá
Attendance: 1,120
Referee: André Luiz de Freitas Castro

5 March 2023
10:00

Atlético Goianiense	7–1	Iporá
	Report

Estádio Antônio Accioly, Goiânia

Atlético Goianiense advanced to the semi-finals

==== Group D ====
21 February 2023
19:30

Anápolis	0–0	Vila Nova
	Report

Estádio Jonas Duarte, Anápolis
Attendance: 4,528
Referee: Eduardo Tomaz de Aquino Valadão

4 March 2023
16:00

Vila Nova	0–1	Anápolis
	Report

Estádio Onésio Brasileiro Alvarenga, Goiânia

Anápolis advanced to the semi-finals

==== Group E ====
26 February 2023
16:00

Aparecidense	3–0	CRAC
Vitor Ricardo 22'; Renato Alves 50'; Robert 64'	Report

Estádio Annibal Batista de Toledo, Aparecida de Goiânia
Attendance: 1,680
Referee: Wilton Sampaio

5 March 2023
16:00

CRAC	1–0	Aparecidense
	Report

Estádio Genervino da Fonseca, Catalão

Aparecidense advanced to the semi-finals

=== Semi-finals ===
Team 1	Agg.	Team 2	1st leg	2nd leg
Anápolis	0–4	Goiás	0–1	0–3
Aparecidense	1–4	Atlético Goianiense	1–2	0–2

==== Group F ====
11 March 2023
18:00

Anápolis	0–1	Goiás

Estádio Jonas Duarte, Anápolis

Goiás	3–0	Anápolis

Goiás advanced to the finals

==== Group G ====
11 March 2023
16:00

Aparecidense	1–2	Atlético Goianiense

Estádio Annibal Batista de Toledo, Aparecida de Goiânia

Atlético Goianiense	2–0	Aparecidense

Atlético Goianiense advanced to the finals

=== Finals ===
Team 1	Agg.	Team 2	1st leg	2nd leg
Atlético Goianiense	3–3 (5–4 p)	Goiás	2–0	1–3

==== Matches ====
2 April 2023
16:00

Atlético Goianiense	2–0	Goiás
Luiz Fernando 41'; Rodrigo Soares 51'	Report

Estádio Antônio Accioly, Goiânia
Attendance: 12,089
Referee: Ramon Abatti Abel (Santa Catarina)

Atlético Goianiense	Goiás

GK	1	(Brazil) Ronaldo (c)
DF	2	(Brazil) Rodrigo Soares
DF	3	(Brazil) Lucas Gazal
DF	4	(Brazil) Emerson Santos	(substituted off) 65'
DF	6	(Brazil) Jefferson
MF	5	(Brazil) Matheus Sales
MF	8	(Brazil) Rhaldney
MF	7	(Brazil) Moraes	(substituted off) 61'
MF	10	(Brazil) Shaylon	(substituted off) 77'
FW	11	(Brazil) Luiz Fernando
FW	9	(Brazil) Gustavo Coutinho	(substituted off) 77'
Substitutes:
GK	12	(Brazil) Diego Loureiro
DF	13	(Brazil) Luan Sales
DF	14	(Brazil) Renan Cosenza
DF	15	(Brazil) Ramon Menezes	(substituted on) 65'
MF	16	(Brazil) Mikael
FW	17	(Brazil) Bruno Tubarão	(substituted on) 61'
FW	18	(Brazil) Kelvin	(substituted on) 77'
FW	19	(Brazil) Igor Torres	(substituted on) 77'
FW	20	(Brazil) Daniel
Coach:
(Brazil) Mozart

GK	23	(Brazil) Tadeu (c)
DF	22	(Brazil) Apodi
DF	3	(Brazil) Lucas Halter	(yellow card) 35'
DF	19	(Brazil) Bruno Melo
DF	6	(Brazil) Sander
MF	5	(Brazil) Zé Ricardo	(yellow card) 45+3'	(substituted off) 46'
MF	8	(Brazil) Fellipe Bastos		(substituted off) 82'
MF	12	(Brazil) Willian Oliveira		(substituted off) 46'
MF	10	(Argentina) Julián Palacios		(substituted off) 60'
FW	7	(Brazil) Vinícius		(substituted off) 75'
FW	9	(Brazil) Nicolas
Substitutes:
GK	21	(Brazil) Marcelo Rangel
DF	2	(Brazil) Maguinho
DF	4	(Brazil) Sidimar
DF	13	(Brazil) Edu
DF	14	(Brazil) Hugo
MF	15	(Brazil) Felipe		(substituted on) 46'
MF	17	(Brazil) Andrey		(substituted on) 82'
MF	20	(Brazil) Diego		(substituted on) 46'
MF	26	(Brazil) Nathan Melo
FW	11	(Brazil) Diego Gonçalves		(substituted on) 60'
FW	16	(Brazil) Alesson		(substituted on) 75'
FW	18	(Brazil) Philippe Costa
Coach:
(Brazil) Guto Ferreira

Assistant referees:
Kléber Lúcio Gil (Santa Catarina)
Johnny Barros de Oliveira (Santa Catarina)
Fourth official:
Rubens Paulo Rodrigues dos Santos
Video assistant referee:
Daiane Caroline Muniz dos Santos (Santa Catarina)
Assistant video assistant referees:
Leone Carvalho Rocha

9 April 2023
16:00

Goiás	3–1	Atlético Goianiense
Alesson 38'; Vinícius 54' (pen.); Palacios 90+5'	Report	Luiz Fernando 30'
Penalties
Vinícius (penalty scored); Matheus Peixoto (penalty scored); Diego Gonçalves (penalty scored); Bruno Melo (penalty scored); Hugo (penalty missed)	4–5	(penalty scored) Lucas Gazal; (penalty scored) Airton; (penalty scored) Rodrigo Soares; (penalty scored) Emerson Santos; (penalty scored) Bruno Tubarão

Estádio da Serrinha, Goiânia
Attendance: 14,095
Referee: Wilton Sampaio

Goiás	Atlético Goianiense

GK	23	(Brazil) Tadeu (c)	(yellow card) 46'
DF	22	(Brazil) Apodi		(substituted off) 73'
DF	4	(Brazil) Sidimar	(yellow card) 16' (red card)
DF	19	(Brazil) Bruno Melo	(yellow card) 90+4' (yellow-red card)
DF	6	(Brazil) Sander		(substituted off) 73'
MF	12	(Brazil) Willian Oliveira		(substituted off) 70'
MF	8	(Brazil) Fellipe Bastos	(yellow card) 45' (yellow-red card) 45+7'
MF	20	(Brazil) Diego
FW	7	(Brazil) Vinícius	(yellow card) 90+2'
FW	9	(Brazil) Nicolas		(substituted off) 61'
FW	27	(Brazil) Alesson		(substituted off) 73'
Substitutes:
GK	88	(Brazil) Marcelo Rangel
DF	2	(Brazil) Maguinho		(substituted on) 73'
DF	43	(Brazil) Edu
DF	66	(Brazil) Hugo		(substituted on) 73'
MF	10	(Argentina) Julián Palacios		(substituted on) 70'
MF	15	(Brazil) Felipe
MF	26	(Brazil) Nathan Melo
MF	30	(Brazil) Matheusinho
MF	77	(Brazil) Jhonny Lucas
FW	11	(Brazil) Diego Gonçalves		(substituted on) 61'
FW	17	(Brazil) Matheus Peixoto		(substituted on) 73'
FW	90	(Brazil) Philippe Costa
Coach:
(Brazil) Guto Ferreira

GK	1	(Brazil) Ronaldo (c)
DF	2	(Brazil) Rodrigo Soares
DF	3	(Brazil) Lucas Gazal
DF	4	(Brazil) Emerson Santos	Sent off (straight red)
DF	6	(Brazil) Jefferson	(yellow card) 12'
MF	5	(Brazil) Matheus Sales
MF	8	(Brazil) Rhaldney	(yellow card) 45+1' (yellow-red card) 70'
MF	7	(Brazil) Moraes	(yellow card) 35'	(substituted off) 59'
MF	10	(Brazil) Shaylon		(substituted off) 79'
MF	11	(Brazil) Luiz Fernando	Sent off (straight red)	(substituted off) 84'
FW	9	(Brazil) Gustavo Coutinho	(yellow card) 16'	(substituted off) 59'
Substitutes:
GK	12	(Brazil) Diego Loureiro
DF	13	(Brazil) Luan Sales
DF	14	(Brazil) Ramon Menezes		(substituted on) 79'
DF	15	(Brazil) Renan Cosenza
MF	16	(Brazil) Mikael
FW	17	(Brazil) Bruno Tubarão		(substituted on) 59'
FW	18	(Brazil) Kelvin
FW	19	(Brazil) Igor Torres		(substituted on) 84'
FW	20	(Brazil) Daniel
FW	21	(Brazil) Airton		(substituted on) 59'
Coach:
(Brazil) Mozart

Luiz Fernando (Atlético Goianiense) was sent off after the match but before the penalty shoot-out
Bruno Melo (Goiás) was booked a second time during the penalty shoot-out
Sidimar (Goiás) and Emerson Santos (Atlético Goianiense) were sent off during the penalty shoot-out

Assistant referees:
Bruno Raphael Pires
Tiago Gomes da Silva
Fourth official:
Victor Lucas Pereira Silva
Video assistant referee:
José Cláudio Rocha Filho (São Paulo)
Assistant video assistant referees:
Hugo Sávio Xavier Corrêa

== Overall table ==
Pos	Team	Pld	W	D	L	GF	GA	GD	Pts	Qualification or relegation
1	Atlético Goianiense	17	13	1	3	40	18	+22	40	Champions and 2024 Copa do Brasil
2	Goiás	17	13	2	2	37	14	+23	41	Runners-up and 2024 Copa do Brasil
3	Aparecidense	15	6	2	7	15	15	0	20	2024 Copa do Brasil
4	Anápolis	15	4	7	4	13	12	+1	19	2024 Série D and 2024 Copa do Brasil
5	Vila Nova	13	5	6	2	16	6	+10	21	
6	CRAC	13	6	3	4	18	14	+4	21	2024 Série D
7	Iporá	13	4	2	7	14	22	−8	14	2024 Série D
8	Goiânia	13	4	2	7	14	32	−18	14	
9	Goianésia	11	4	1	6	9	15	−6	13	
10	Morrinhos	11	2	2	7	13	18	−5	8	
11	Grêmio Anápolis	11	1	4	6	11	21	−10	7	Relegation to the Divisão de Acesso
12	Inhumas	11	1	2	8	8	21	−13	5	Relegation to the Divisão de Acesso

Source: FGF
