= 2023 Botafogo FR season =

Botafogo
2023 season
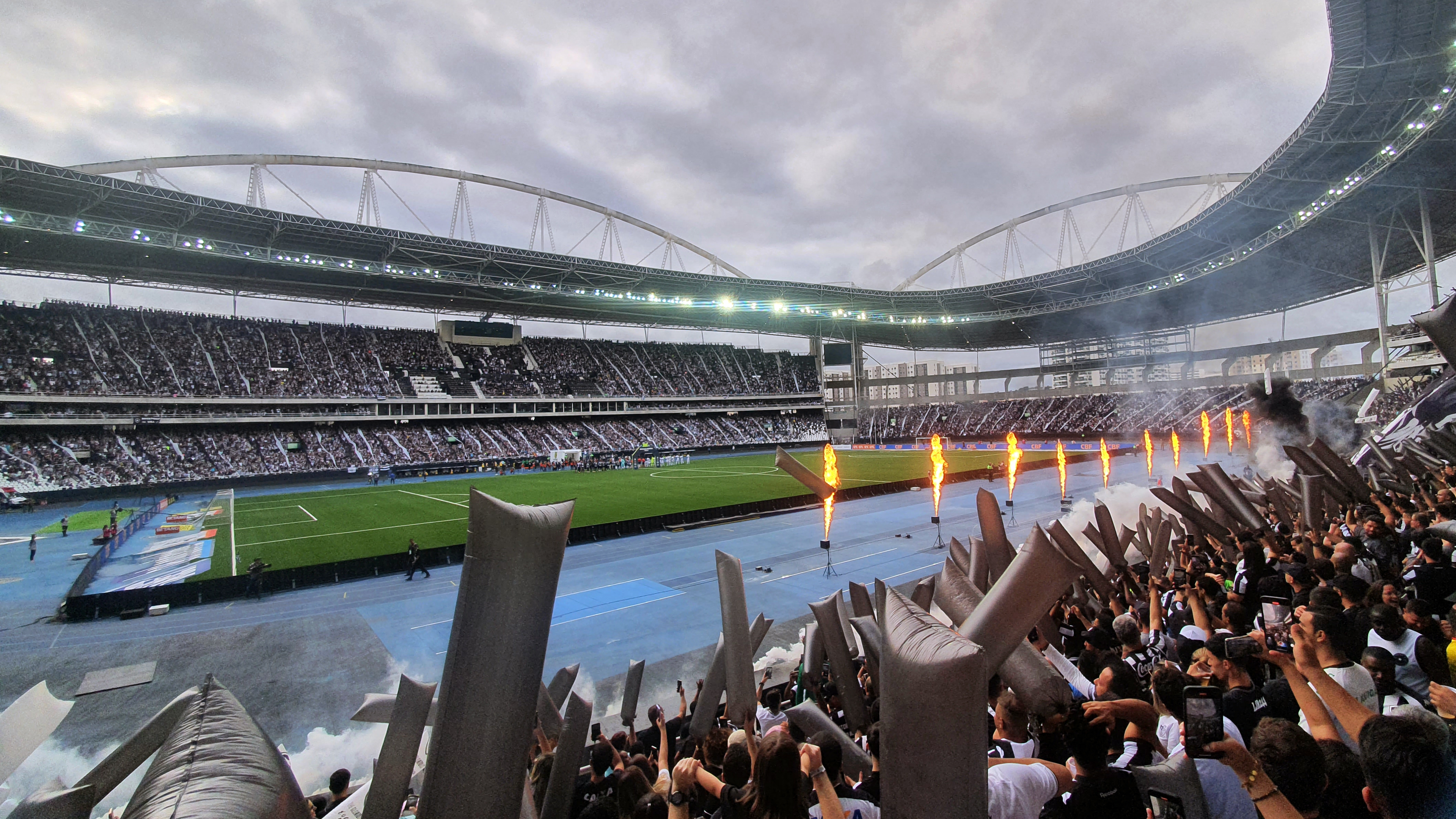
- Botafogo vs Coritiba, Brasileirão
- Manager: Luís Castro (until 30 June); Cláudio Caçapa (1–17 July); Bruno Lage (18 July to 4 October); Lúcio Flávio (5 October to 15 November); Tiago Nunes (from 15 November)
- Stadium: Estádio Nilton Santos
- Série A: 5th
- Campeonato Carioca: 5th Taça Rio winners
- Copa do Brasil: Round of 16
- Copa Sudamericana: Quarter-finals
- Top goalscorer: League: Tiquinho Soares (17); All: Tiquinho Soares (29)
- Biggest win: Botafogo 7–1 Brasiliense FC
- Biggest defeat: Vasco da Gama 2–0 Botafogo; Internacional 3–1 Botafogo

The 2023 season was Botafogo de Futebol e Regatas's 119th season in existence and the club's second consecutive season in the top flight of Brazilian football. In addition to the domestic league, Botafogo participated in this season's edition of the Campeonato Carioca, Copa do Brasil and Copa Sudamericana. The season started on 15 January and concluded on 6 December 2023.

== Players ==
Note: Flags indicate national team as defined under FIFA eligibility rules; some limited exceptions apply. Players may hold more than one non-FIFA nationality.

No.	Pos.	Nation	Player
1	GK	PAR	Gatito Fernández (vice-captain)
2	DF	BRA	Rafael
4	DF	URU	Mateo Ponte
5	MF	BRA	Danilo Barbosa
6	MF	BRA	Tchê Tchê
7	FW	BRA	Victor Sá
8	MF	BRA	Patrick de Paula
9	FW	BRA	Tiquinho Soares
10	FW	PAR	Matías Segovia
11	FW	BRA	Luis Henrique (on loan from Marseille)
12	GK	BRA	Lucas Perri
14	MF	BRA	Gabriel Pires (on loan from Benfica)
15	DF	ARG	Víctor Cuesta (on loan from Internacional)
16	DF	BRA	Hugo
17	MF	BRA	Marlon Freitas
18	MF	BRA	Lucas Fernandes
19	FW	ESP	Diego Costa

No.	Pos.	Nation	Player
21	DF	BRA	Fernando Marçal
23	DF	ANG	Bastos
24	DF	ARG	Leonel Di Plácido (on loan from Lanús)
27	FW	BRA	Carlos Alberto (on loan from América Mineiro)
32	MF	NCA	Jacob Montes
33	MF	BRA	Carlos Eduardo
34	DF	BRA	Adryelson
37	FW	BRA	Júnior Santos
39	FW	BRA	Janderson
43	DF	BRA	David Sousa
52	GK	BRA	Igo Gabriel
57	MF	BRA	JP Galvão
71	FW	URU	Valentín Adamo
75	MF	BRA	Raí
77	FW	URU	Diego Hernández
90	FW	BRA	Matheus Nascimento
94	DF	BRA	Philipe Sampaio

=== Out on loan ===
Note: Flags indicate national team as defined under FIFA eligibility rules; some limited exceptions apply. Players may hold more than one non-FIFA nationality.

No.	Pos.	Nation	Player
—	DF	BRA	Daniel Borges (to América Mineiro until 31 December 2024)
—	DF	BRA	Ewerton (to Juventude until 30 November 2023)
—	DF	BRA	Jefinho (to ABC until 30 November 2023)
—	DF	ECU	Luis Segovia (to RWD Molenbeek until 30 June 2024)
—	DF	BRA	Vitor Marinho (to Resende until 30 November 2023)
—	MF	BRA	Breno (to Ceará until 31 December 2023)
—	MF	BRA	Caio Vitor (to Volta Redonda until 30 November 2023)
—	MF	BRA	Fabinho (to Sport Recife until 30 November 2023)
—	MF	BRA	Kayque (to RWD Molenbeek until 30 June 2024)

No.	Pos.	Nation	Player
—	MF	BRA	Luís Oyama (to Goiás until 31 December 2023)
—	FW	BRA	Chay (to Ceará until 31 December 2023)
—	FW	BRA	Emerson Urso (to Ituano until 30 November 2023)
—	FW	BRA	Erison (to São Paulo until 31 December 2023)
—	FW	BRA	Gabriel (to CRB until 30 November 2023)
—	FW	BRA	Vinícius Lopes (to Santa Clara until 30 June 2024)
—	FW	BRA	Gustavo Sauer (to Çaykur Rizespor until 30 June 2024)
—	FW	BRA	Rikelmi (to RWD Molenbeek until 30 June 2024)
—	FW	BRA	Ronald (to Vila Nova until 30 November 2023)

== Transfers ==
=== In ===
Pos.	Player	Transferred from	Fee	Date	Source
MF	(Brazil) Marlon Freitas	(Brazil) Atlético Goianiense	Free	6 January 2023	
DF	(Ecuador) Luis Segovia	(Ecuador) Independiente	Free	11 January 2023	
FW	(Brazil) Carlos Alberto	(Brazil) América Mineiro	Loan	12 January 2023	
FW	(Brazil) Júnior Santos	(Brazil) Fortaleza	$200,000	31 March 2023	
FW	(Spain) Diego Costa	Free agent	Free	12 August 2023	
MF	(Paraguay) Matías Segovia	(Paraguay) Club Guaraní	€1,400,000	4 April 2023	

=== Out ===
Pos.	Player	Transferred to	Fee	Date	Source
MF	(Brazil) Jeffinho	(France) Lyon	€10,000,000	31 January 2023	
DF	(Ecuador) Luis Segovia	(Belgium) RWD Molenbeek	Loan	2 August 2023	

== Pre-season ==
On 4 January, the team canceled its scheduled pre-season tour in Florida, United States due to the regulations of the Rio de Janeiro State Federation (FERJ) regarding the necessity of the participation of key players in the Campeonato Carioca.

== Competitions ==
=== Overall record ===
Competition	First match	Last match	Starting round	Final position	Record							
Competition	First match	Last match	Starting round	Final position	Pld	W	D	L	GF	GA	GD	Win %
Série A	15 April 2023	6 December 2023	Matchday 1	5th	38	18	10	10	58	37	+21	47.37
Campeonato Carioca	15 January 2023	9 April 2023	Taça Guanabara	5th Taça Rio winners	15	9	2	4	20	9	+11	60.00
Copa do Brasil	2 March 2023	17 May 2023	First round	Round of 16	5	3	1	1	14	5	+9	60.00
Copa Sudamericana	6 April 2023	30 August 2023	Group stage	Quarter-finals	12	4	7	1	17	10	+7	33.33
Total					70	34	20	16	109	61	+48	48.57

Source: Competitions

=== Campeonato Brasileiro Série A ===
==== League table ====
Pos	Team	Pld	W	D	L	GF	GA	GD	Pts	Qualification or relegation
3	Atlético Mineiro	38	19	9	10	52	32	+20	66	Qualification for Copa Libertadores group stage
4	Flamengo	38	19	9	10	56	42	+14	66	Qualification for Copa Libertadores group stage
5	Botafogo	38	18	10	10	58	37	+21	64	Qualification for Copa Libertadores second stage
6	Red Bull Bragantino	38	17	11	10	49	35	+14	62	Qualification for Copa Libertadores second stage
7	Fluminense	38	16	8	14	51	47	+4	56	Qualification for Copa Libertadores group stage (Note: Fluminense qualified for the Copa Libertadores group stage by winning the 2023 Copa Libertadores.)

Source: CBF
Rules for classification: 1) points; 2) wins; 3) goal difference; 4) goals scored; 5) head-to-head results (only between two teams); 6) fewest red cards; 7) fewest yellow cards; 8) drawing of lots.

==== Results summary ====
Overall								Home						Away					
Pld	W	D	L	GF	GA	GD	Pts	W	D	L	GF	GA	GD	W	D	L	GF	GA	GD
38	18	10	10	58	37	+21	64	11	4	4	36	17	+19	7	6	6	22	20	+2

==== Results by round ====
Round	1	2	3	4	5	6	7	8	9	10	11	12	13	14	15	16	17	18	19	20	21	22	23	24	25	26	27	28	29	30	31	32	33	34	35	36	37	38
Ground	H	A	A	H	H	A	H	H	A	H	A	A	H	A	H	A	H	A	H	A	H	H	A	A	H	A	A	H	H	H	A	H	A	A	H	A	H	A
Result	W	W	W	W	W	L	W	W	L	W	W	W	W	W	W	D	W	D	W	D	W	L	L	L	D	W	W	D	L	L	L	L	D	D	D	D	D	L
Position	3	2	1	1	1	1	1	1	1	1	1	1	1	1	1	1	1	1	1	1	1	1	1	1	1	1	1	1	1	1				2	3	2	5	5

Source: Worldfootball
A = Away; H = Home; W = Win; D = Draw; L = Loss

==== Matches ====
15 April 2023 1	Botafogo	2–1	São Paulo	Rio de Janeiro
18:30 UTC−3	Tiquinho Soares 4'; Carlos Eduardo 88'		Calleri 15'	Stadium: Estádio Nilton Santos; Referee: Ramon Abatti

24 April 2023 2	Bahia	1–2	Botafogo	Salvador
20:00 UTC−3	Vítor Jacaré 41'		Júnior Santos 29'; Tchê Tchê 78'	Stadium: Arena Fonte Nova; Referee: Raphael Claus

30 April 2023 3	Flamengo	2–3	Botafogo	Rio de Janeiro
16:00 UTC−3				Stadium: Maracanã; Attendance: 53,138; Referee: Edina Alves Batista

7 May 2023 4	Botafogo	2–0	Atlético Mineiro	Rio de Janeiro
18:30 UTC−3				Stadium: Estádio Nilton Santos; Referee: Flavio Rodrigues De Souza

11 May 2023 5	Botafogo	3–0	Corinthians	Rio de Janeiro
19:30 UTC−3				Stadium: Estádio Nilton Santos; Referee: Anderson Daronco

14 May 2023 6	Goiás	2–1	Botafogo	Goiânia
	Bruno Ferreira Melo 45+5'; Maguinho 57'		Tiquinho Soares 33' (pen.)	Stadium: Estádio Serra Dourada

20 May 2023 7	Botafogo	1–0	Fluminense	Rio de Janeiro
	Victor Cuesta 74'			Stadium: Estádio Nilton Santos

29 May 2023 8	Botafogo	2–0	América Mineiro	Rio de Janeiro
				Stadium: Estádio Nilton Santos

3 June 2023 9	Athletico Paranaense	1–0	Botafogo

11 June 2023 10	Botafogo	2–0	Fortaleza	Rio de Janeiro
				Stadium: Estádio Nilton Santos

23 June 2023 11	Cuiabá	0–1	Botafogo

25 June 2023 12	Palmeiras	0–1	Botafogo

2 July 2023 13	Botafogo	2–0	Vasco da Gama	Rio de Janeiro
				Stadium: Estádio Nilton Santos

9 July 2023 14	Grêmio	0–2	Botafogo

16 July 2023 15	Botafogo	2–0	Red Bull Bragantino	Rio de Janeiro
				Stadium: Estádio Nilton Santos

23 July 2023 16	Santos	2–2	Botafogo

30 July 2023 17	Botafogo	4–1	Coritiba	Rio de Janeiro
				Stadium: Estádio Nilton Santos

6 August 2023 18	Cruzeiro	0–0	Botafogo

13 August 2023 19	Botafogo	3–1	Internacional	Rio de Janeiro
				Stadium: Estádio Nilton Santos

19 August 2023 20	São Paulo	0–0	Botafogo	São Paulo
				Stadium: Estádio do Morumbi

27 August 2023 21	Botafogo	3–0	Bahia	Rio de Janeiro
				Stadium: Estádio Nilton Santos

3 September 2023 22	Botafogo	1–2	Flamengo	Rio de Janeiro
				Stadium: Estádio Nilton Santos

17 September 2023 23	Atlético Mineiro	1–0	Botafogo

22 September 2023 24	Corinthians	1–0	Botafogo	São Paulo
20:00 UTC−3				Stadium: Neo Quimica Arena

2 October 2023 25	Botafogo	1–1	Goiás	Rio de Janeiro
20:00 UTC−3				Stadium: Estádio Nilton Santos

8 October 2023 26	Fluminense	0–2	Botafogo	Rio de Janeiro
16:00 UTC−3				Stadium: Maracanã; Referee: Leandro Vuaden

18 October 2023 27	América Mineiro	1–2	Botafogo	Belo Horizonte
20:00 UTC−3				Stadium: Arena Independência

21 October 2023 28	Botafogo	1–1	Athletico Paranaense	Rio de Janeiro
21:00 UTC−3				Stadium: Estádio Nilton Santos

29 October 2023 30	Botafogo	0–1	Cuiabá	Rio de Janeiro
20:00 UTC−3			Pitta 52'	Stadium: Estádio Nilton Santos

1 November 2023 31	Botafogo	3–4	Palmeiras	Rio de Janeiro
21:30 UTC−3	Carlos Eduardo 21'; Tchê Tchê 30', (yellow card) 80'; Victor Cuesta (yellow card) 33'; Júnior Santos 36'; Tiquinho Soares (yellow card) 69', (penalty missed) 83'; Adryelson (red card) 76'; Fernando Marçal (yellow card) 83'; Marlon Freitas (yellow card) 90+7'		Mayke (yellow card) 11'; Endrick 49', 84'; Rony (yellow card) 80'; Gustavo Gómez (yellow card) 80'; Artur Victor Guimaraes (yellow card) 87'; José Manuel López 89'; Di Plácido (yellow card) 90+7'; Murilo Cerqueira 90+9', (yellow card) 90+10'	Stadium: Estádio Nilton Santos; Attendance: 34,913; Referee: Braulio da Silva Machado

6 November 2023 32	Vasco da Gama	1–0	Botafogo	Rio de Janeiro
19:00 UTC−3				Stadium: São Januário

9 November 2023 33	Botafogo	3–4	Grêmio	Rio de Janeiro
20:00 UTC−3				Stadium: Estádio Nilton Santos

12 November 2023 34	Red Bull Bragantino	2–2	Botafogo	Bragança Paulista
16:00 UTC−3				Stadium: Estádio Nabi Abi Chedid

23 November 2023 29	Fortaleza	2–2	Botafogo	Fortaleza
19:00 UTC−3	Yago Pikachu 8'; Guilherme 41'		Brítez 20' (o.g.); Danilo Barbosa 78'	Stadium: Castelão; Referee: Ramon Abatti

26 November 2023 35	Botafogo	1–1	Santos	Rio de Janeiro
16:00 UTC−3	Danilo Barbosa 11'		Messias 90'	Stadium: Estádio Nilton Santos; Referee: Wilton Sampaio

29 November 2023 36	Coritiba	1–1	Botafogo	Curitiba
21:30 UTC−3	Thalisson Gabriel (yellow card) 18'; Robson (yellow card) 34'; Jamerson Bahia (red card) 45+4'; Andrey Ramos do Nascimento (yellow card) 63'; Kuscevic (yellow card) 90+7'; Edu 90+9'		Carlos Eduardo (red card) 32'; Tiquinho Soares (yellow card) 7', (goal) 90+7' (pen.)	Stadium: Estádio Couto Pereira; Referee: Rodrigo José Pereira de Lima

3 December 2023 37	Botafogo	0–0	Cruzeiro	Rio de Janeiro
18:30 UTC−3	Danilo Barbosa (yellow card) 32'; Gabriel (yellow card) 45+1'; Adryelson (yellow card) 47'; Costa (yellow card) 89'		Palacios (yellow card) 21'; Hueglo Neris (yellow card) 45+3'; Luciano Castán (yellow card) 90+5'	Stadium: Estádio Nilton Santos; Referee: Wilton Sampaio

6 December 2023 38	Internacional	3–1	Botafogo	Porto Alegre
21:30 UTC−3	Enner Valencia 19'; Alan Patrick 50'; Pedro Henrique 53', (yellow card) 54'		Danilo Barbosa (yellow card) 45+1'; Janderson 47'; Matheus Nascimento (yellow card) 90+2'	Stadium: Estádio Beira-Rio; Referee: Flavio Rodrigues De Souza

=== Copa do Brasil ===
2 March 2023 First round	Sergipe	1–1	Botafogo	Aracaju
				Stadium: Batistão; Attendance: 9,500; Referee: Braulio Da Silva Machado

15 March 2023 Second round	Botafogo	7–1	Brasiliense FC	Cariacica
				Stadium: Estádio Kleber Andrade; Attendance: 3,869; Referee: Anderson Daronco

==== Third round ====
12 April 2023 First leg	Ypiranga	0–2	Botafogo	Erechim
				Stadium: Estádio Olímpico Colosso da Lagoa; Attendance: 4,964; Referee: Paulo Cezar Zanovelli Da Silva

27 April 2023 Second leg	Botafogo	2–0 (4–0 agg.)	Ypiranga	Rio de Janeiro
				Stadium: Estádio Nilton Santos; Attendance: 11,088; Referee: Denis Da Silva Ribeiro Serafim

==== Round of 16 ====
17 May 2023 First leg	Athletico Paranaense	3–2	Botafogo	Curitiba
21:30 UTC−3	Vitor Roque 56'; Vitor Bueno 62'; Fernandinho 82'		Tiquinho Soares 39'; Luis Henrique 41'	Stadium: Arena da Baixada; Attendance: 22,278; Referee: Leandro Vuaden

31 May 2023 Second leg	Botafogo	1–0 (3–3 agg.) (2–4 p)	Athletico Paranaense	Rio de Janeiro
21:30 UTC−3	Tiquinho Soares 17'			Stadium: Estádio Nilton Santos; Attendance: 37,682; Referee: Anderson Daronco
	Penalties
	Tiquinho Soares (penalty missed); Tchê Tchê (penalty missed); Marlon Freitas (penalty scored); Lucas Fernandes (penalty scored)		(penalty scored) Thiago Heleno; (penalty scored) Vitor Bueno; (penalty scored) David Terans; (penalty scored) Alex Santana

=== Copa Sudamericana ===
==== Group stage ====
Pos	Team	Pld	W	D	L	GF	GA	GD	Pts	Qualification
1	(Ecuador) LDU Quito	6	3	3	0	10	2	+8	12	Advance to round of 16
2	(Brazil) Botafogo	6	2	4	0	10	5	+5	10	Advance to knockout round play-offs
3	(Chile) Magallanes	6	0	4	2	8	13	−5	4	
4	(Peru) Universidad César Vallejo	6	1	1	4	8	16	−8	4	

Source: CONMEBOL
Rules for classification: 1) Points; 2) Goal difference; 3) Goals scored; 4) Away goals scored; 5) CONMEBOL ranking.

6 April 2023 1	Magallanes (Chile)	2–2	(Brazil) Botafogo	Rancagua, Chile
20:00 UTC−4	Canales 16'; Villanueva (red card) 50'; Contreras 75'		Tiquinho 6'; Carlos Eduardo 58'	Stadium: Estadio El Teniente

20 April 2023 2	Botafogo (Brazil)	4–0	(Peru) Universidad César Vallejo	Rio de Janeiro
21:00 UTC−3				Stadium: Estádio Nilton Santos

4 May 2023 3	Botafogo (Brazil)	0–0	(Ecuador) LDU Quito	Rio de Janeiro
21:00 UTC−3				Stadium: Estádio Nilton Santos

25 May 2023 4	Universidad César Vallejo (Peru)	2–3	(Brazil) Botafogo	Trujillo, Peru
19:00 UTC−5				Stadium: Estadio Mansiche

6 June 2023 5	LDU Quito (Ecuador)	0–0	(Brazil) Botafogo	Quito, Ecuador
19:00 UTC−5				Stadium: Estadio Rodrigo Paz Delgado

29 June 2023 6	Botafogo (Brazil)	1–1	(Chile) Magallanes	Rio de Janeiro
21:00 UTC−3	Marlon Freitas 19', (red card) 67'		Zapata 80'; Espinoza (yellow card) 43' (yellow-red card) 90+3'	Stadium: Estádio Nilton Santos

==== Final stages ====
===== Knockout round play-offs =====
12 July 2023 First leg	Patronato (Argentina)	0–2	(Brazil) Botafogo	Paraná, Argentina
19:00 UTC−4				Stadium: Estadio Presbítero Bartolomé Grella; Attendance: 3,759

19 July 2023 Second leg	Botafogo (Brazil)	1–1 (3–1 agg.)	(Argentina) Patronato	Rio de Janeiro
19:00 UTC−3				Stadium: Estádio Nilton Santos; Attendance: 20,509

===== Round of 16 =====
2 August 2023 First leg	Botafogo (Brazil)	2–1	(Paraguay) Guaraní	Rio de Janeiro
19:00 UTC−3				Stadium: Estádio Nilton Santos; Attendance: 23,916

9 August 2023 Second leg	Guaraní (Paraguay)	0–0 (1–2 agg.)	(Brazil) Botafogo	Asunción, Paraguay
18:00 UTC−4				Stadium: Estadio Defensores del Chaco; Attendance: 4,273

===== Quarter-finals =====
23 August 2023 First leg	Botafogo (Brazil)	1–1	(Argentina) Defensa y Justicia	Rio de Janeiro
19:00 UTC−3	Pires 56'		Tripichio 78'	Stadium: Estádio Nilton Santos; Attendance: 25,255

30 August 2023 Second leg	Defensa y Justicia (Argentina)	2–1 (3–2 agg.)	(Brazil) Botafogo	Banfield, Argentina
19:00 UTC−3	Fernández 15', 72'		Bologna 45+3' (o.g.)	Stadium: Estadio Florencio Sola; Attendance: 16,648
