= Paracuru =

Municipality in Ceará, Brazil

Coordinates: 3°24′S 39°04′W

- Municipality
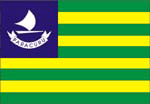
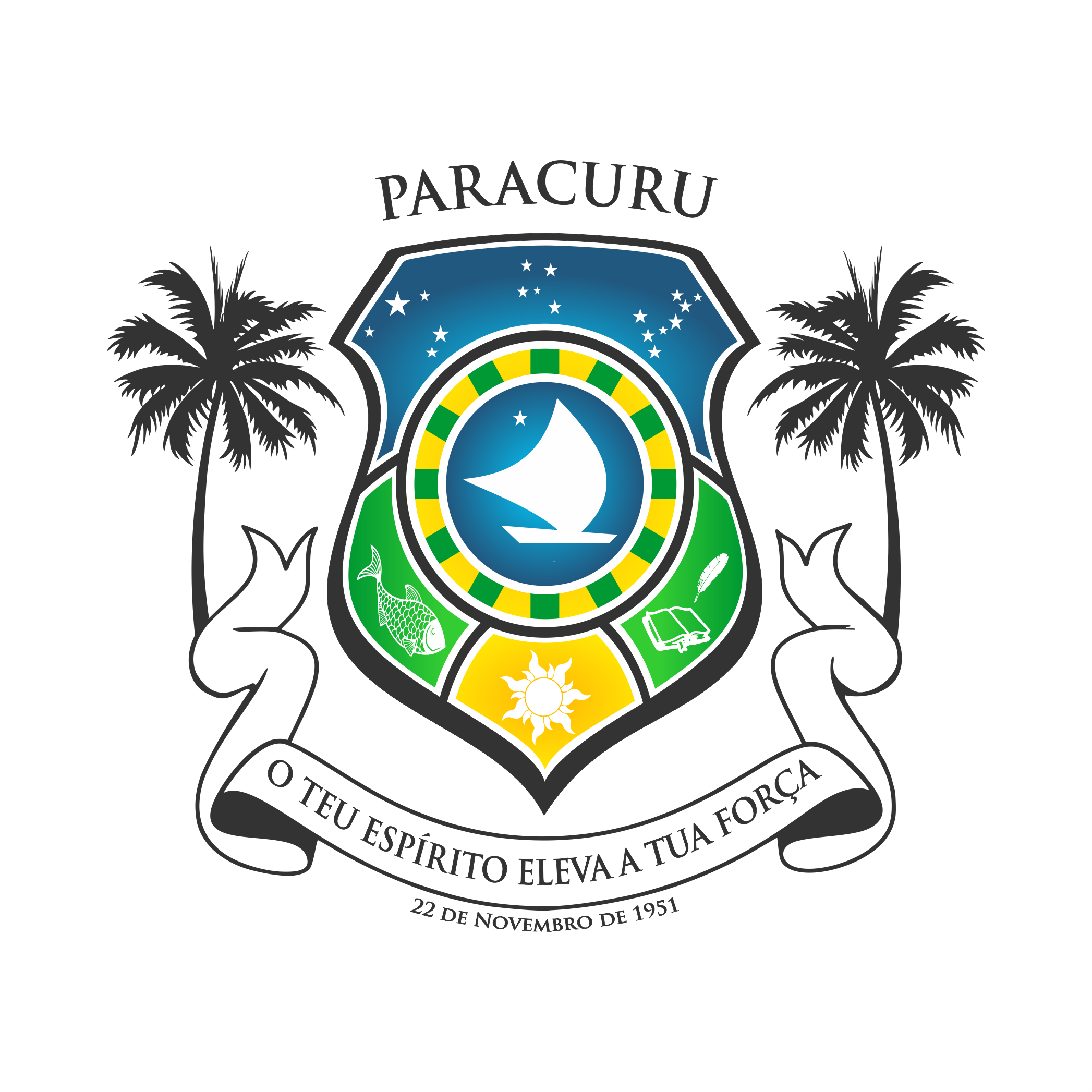
- Flag Coat of arms
- Interactive map of Paracuru
- Country: Brazil
- Region: Nordeste
- State: Ceará
- Mesoregion: Noroeste Cearense

Population (2020)
  - Total: 35,304
- Time zone: UTC−3 (BRT)

Paracuru is a municipality in the state of Ceará in the Northeast region of Brazil.

== History ==
According to historian Rodolfo Spínola books "Vicente Pinzon e a Descoberta do Brasil" and " Naufragos, Traficantes e Deportados" written by journalist Eduardo Bueno: 29 de Janeiro de 1500, Spanish navigator Vicente Yáñez Pinzón was the protagonist of the first battle Brazilian land between Europeans and indigenous paracuruenses Tremembés the outskirts of Rio Curu. Twenty natives died in combat and eight Spanish.

Its origins date back to the late sixteenth century, already in 1888 was the village Alto Alegre do Parazinho; elected city in 1951. Its name in Tupi language means Lizard Sea. 296.60 km2 area of the Municipality. Population about 30,000. Economy: tourism, agro-industry, livestock, shrimp, chicken and eggs, flowers (ornamental pineapple and Sansevero cylinders), agriculture: cultivation of passion fruit, papaya, pineapple, coconut, sugar cane for alcohol; subsistence fisheries. Paracuru home base support for offshore oil wells.

== Notable people ==
- Bruno Ferreira Melo Football player

== See also ==
- List of municipalities in Ceará
