= Emerson Ávila =

Brazilian football manager

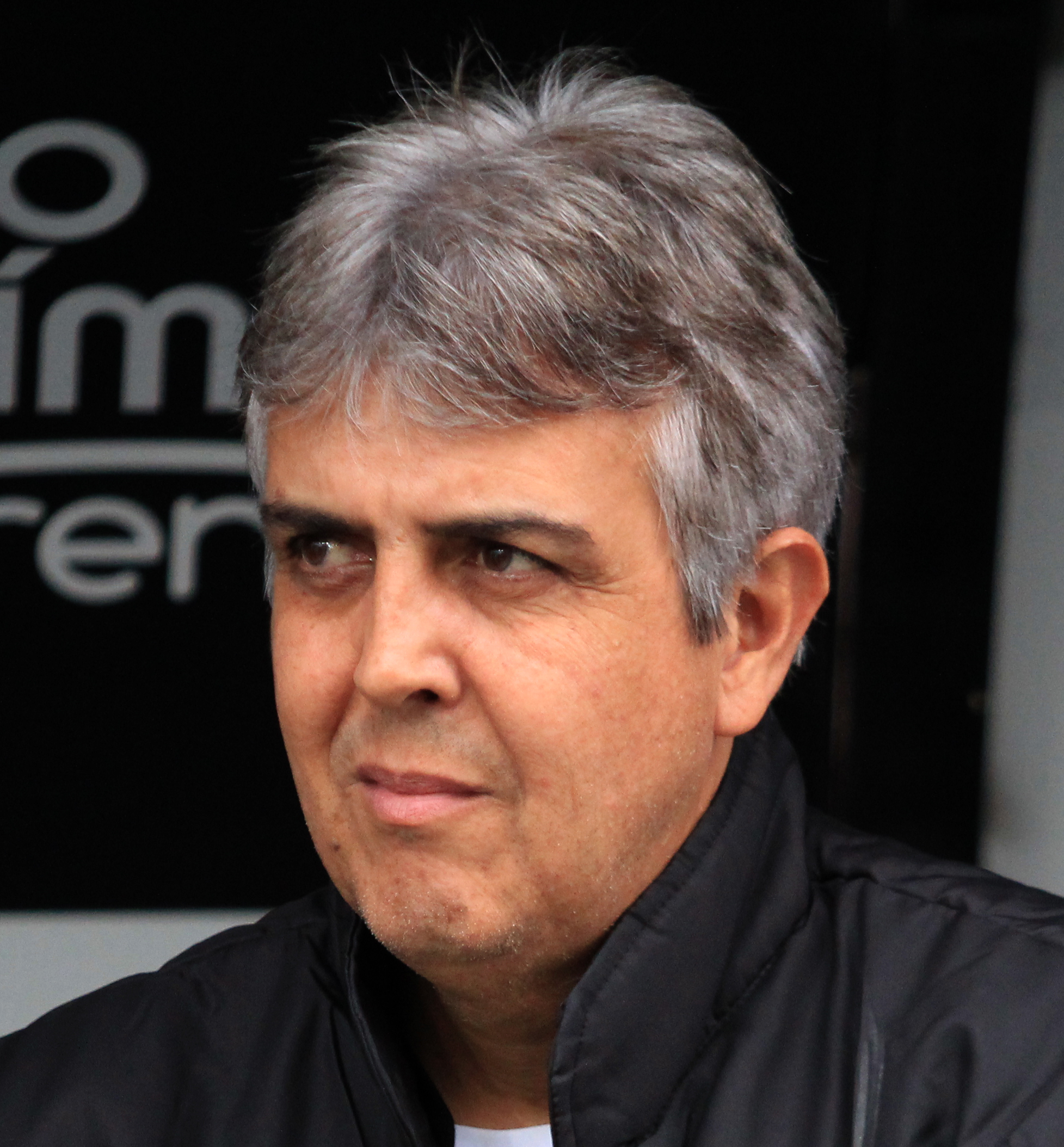
- Ávila in 2022

Personal information
- Full name: Emerson Rodrigues Ávila
- Date of birth: 16 July 1967 (age 59)
- Place of birth: Belo Horizonte, Brazil
- Height: 1.86 m (6 ft 1 in)

Team information
- Current team: Betim (head coach)

Managerial career
- Years: Team
- 1996–2005: Cruzeiro (youth)
- 2005–2007: Cruzeiro (assistant)
- 2007: Cruzeiro (interim)
- 2007–2008: Ipatinga
- 2008: Grêmio Barueri
- 2009: Ipatinga
- 2010: Boavista-RJ
- 2010: Cruzeiro (interim)
- 2010–2011: Brazil U17
- 2011: Cruzeiro
- 2012: Nacional-MG
- 2012–2013: Brazil U20
- 2013: Corinthians U20
- 2014: Esportivo
- 2015–2018: Cruzeiro U20
- 2020: Villa Nova
- 2020: Betim Futebol
- 2021: Pouso Alegre
- 2021: Betim Futebol
- 2021–2022: Juventude (assistant)
- 2022–2023: Goiás (assistant)
- 2023: Goiás (interim)
- 2024: Londrina
- 2024: Aparecidense
- 2025: Pouso Alegre
- 2026–: Betim

Emerson Rodrigues Ávila (born 16 July 1967) is a Brazilian professional football coach. He is the current head coach of Betim.

== Career ==
Born in Belo Horizonte, Minas Gerais, Ávila began his career as a fitness coach of Santa Tereza in 1992. In 1996, he left the side to become a coach of Cruzeiro's Infantil team.

Ávila worked for Cruzeiro's youth categories for ten years before being named assistant manager of the main squad in 2005. On 30 April 2007, he was named interim head coach after Paulo Autuori resigned. His spell lasted one match, as he led the club to a 2–0 win over Atlético Mineiro in the second leg of the 2007 Campeonato Mineiro Finals, with his side losing the title 4–2 on aggregate.

Ávila subsequently returned to his assistant role after the appointment of Dorival Júnior, before being named head coach of Ipatinga in the Série B on 18 July 2007. He led the club to a first-ever promotion to the Série A at the end of the season, but was dismissed on 18 February 2008, after three losses in the first four matches of the new campaign.

On 7 April 2008, Ávila was named in charge of Grêmio Barueri in the second division. Sacked on 14 June, he returned to Cruzeiro on 3 July, but now as a technical coordinator.

Ávila returned to Ipatinga on 17 July 2009, with the club back in the second tier, but was relieved from his duties on 22 October, after only five wins in 18 matches. On 29 January 2010, he took over Boavista for the year's Campeonato Carioca, but was replaced by Jorge Porto on 25 March.

Back to Cruzeiro and his role as a technical coordinator, Ávila was named interim head coach of the side in June 2010, after Adilson Batista resigned. He returned to his previous role after the appointment of Cuca, and was named head coach of the Brazil national under-17 team on 5 November 2010.

Ávila led the under-17 team to the 2011 South American U-17 Championship title, but finished fourth in the 2011 FIFA U-17 World Cup. On 2 September 2011, he was appointed back at Cruzeiro, replacing fired Joel Santana.

Ávila only lasted six matches in charge of Cruzeiro, being replaced by Vagner Mancini on 26 September 2011 and subsequently returning to his coordinator role. On 7 December 2011, he was appointed Nacional-MG head coach.

Dismissed by Nacional on 27 February 2012, Ávila returned to the Brazilian Football Confederation and was in charge of their under-20 team. On 20 March 2013, he was announced as head coach of the under-20 team of Corinthians, but was replaced by Osmar Loss in September.

Ávila was appointed in charge of Esportivo for the 2014 season, but was sacked on 4 February of that year, after just five matches. He returned to Cruzeiro on 24 September 2015, as a coordinator of the youth categories; he was also in charge of the club's under-20 team.

Dismissed by Cruzeiro on 1 July 2019, Ávila returned to coaching duties on 18 December 2019, after being named head coach of Villa Nova. He was sacked the following 10 February, after four matches, and was presented at Betim Futebol seven days later, for the 2020 Campeonato Mineiro Módulo II.

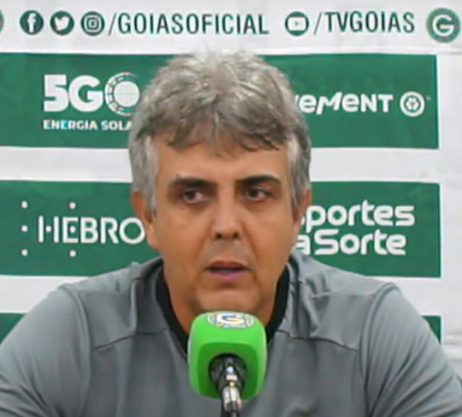
Ávila in 2023

Ávila left Betim on 19 December 2020, after failing to achieve promotion, and was named in charge of Pouso Alegre four days later. He left the latter club on 7 May of the following year, and returned to Betim on 2 August 2021.

On 19 October 2021, Ávila joined Jair Ventura's staff at Juventude, as his assistant. Both left the club on 11 February 2022, and he moved to Goiás with Ventura on 14 April, under the same role.

On 1 December 2022, despite Ventura's departure, Ávila was kept in Goiás' staff for the upcoming season. On 11 April 2023, after the dismissal of Guto Ferreira, he was named interim head coach, and remained in the role for two months before the arrival of Armando Evangelista.

On 22 June 2023, Ávila announced his departure from Goiás. On 27 December, he was named head coach of Londrina for the upcoming season, but was dismissed the following 14 May.

On 9 July 2024, Ávila was named head coach of Aparecidense also in the Série C.

== Coaching statistics ==
As of 14 May 2024

Coaching record by team and tenure
Team	Nat	From	To	Record								Ref
Team	Nat	From	To	G	W	D	L	GF	GA	GD	Win %	Ref
Cruzeiro (interim)	(Brazil)	30 April 2007	8 May 2007	1	1	0	0	2	0	+2	100.00	
Ipatinga	(Brazil)	18 July 2007	18 February 2008	29	16	4	9	52	34	+18	55.17	
Grêmio Barueri	(Brazil)	7 April 2008	14 June 2008	10	4	4	2	20	19	+1	40.00	
Ipatinga	(Brazil)	17 July 2009	22 October 2009	18	5	7	6	19	25	−6	27.78	
Boavista-RJ	(Brazil)	29 January 2010	25 March 2010	9	4	0	5	15	15	+0	44.44	
Cruzeiro (interim)	(Brazil)	4 June 2010	8 June 2010	1	0	0	1	1	2	−1	0.00	
Brazil U17	(Brazil)	5 November 2010	2 September 2011	16	11	2	3	37	23	+14	68.75	
Cruzeiro	(Brazil)	2 September 2011	26 September 2011	6	0	2	4	3	9	−6	0.00	
Nacional-MG	(Brazil)	7 December 2011	27 February 2012	4	1	0	3	5	11	−6	25.00	
Brazil U20	(Brazil)	March 2012	February 2013	4	1	1	2	4	6	−2	25.00	
Esportivo	(Brazil)	December 2013	4 February 2014	5	1	2	2	4	5	−1	20.00	
Villa Nova	(Brazil)	18 December 2019	10 February 2020	4	0	1	3	2	7	−5	0.00	
Betim Futebol	(Brazil)	17 February 2020	19 December 2020	17	8	4	5	19	17	+2	47.06	
Pouso Alegre	(Brazil)	23 December 2020	7 May 2021	13	4	5	4	13	10	+3	30.77	
Betim Futebol	(Brazil)	2 August 2021	18 October 2021	11	4	5	2	14	10	+4	36.36	
Goiás (interim)	(Brazil)	11 April 2023	11 June 2023	16	6	4	6	18	21	−3	37.50	
Londrina	(Brazil)	27 December 2023	14 May 2024	17	5	7	5	23	27	−4	29.41	
Total				181	71	48	62	251	241	+10	39.23	—

== Honours ==
Brazil U17

- South American U-17 Championship: 2011

Goiás

- Copa Verde: 2023
