= Bruno Santos (footballer, born 1993) =

Brazilian footballer

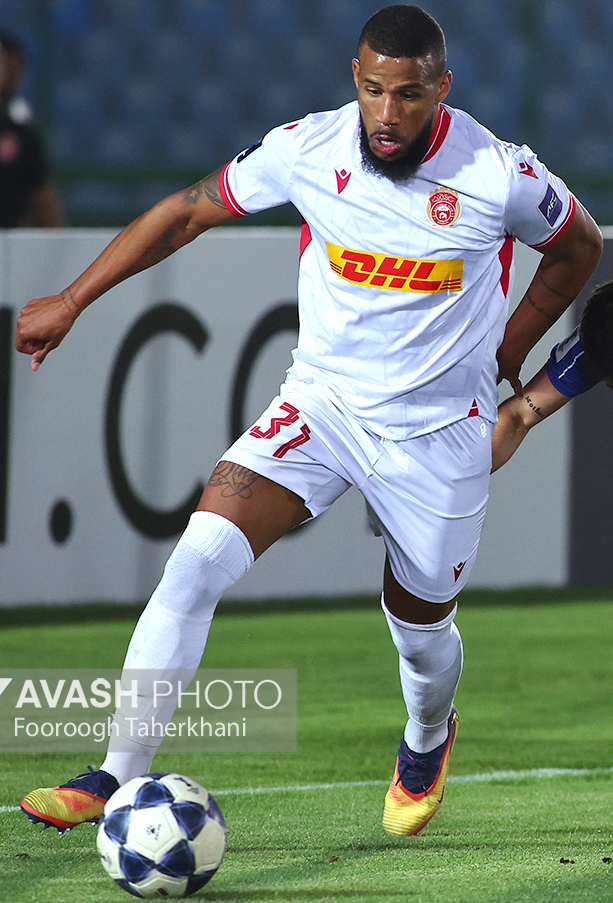
- Santos with Al-Muharraq in 2025

Personal information
- Full name: Bruno Araújo dos Santos
- Date of birth: 7 February 1993 (age 33)
- Place of birth: Rio de Janeiro, Brazil
- Height: 1.83 m (6 ft 0 in)
- Position: Right-back

Senior career*
Years	Team	Apps	(Gls)
2013	Mesquita		
2013–2014	Sourense	14	(0)
2014–2015	Freamunde	19	(2)
2015–2020	Paços de Ferreira	116	(4)
2020–2023	AEL Limassol	55	(4)
2023–2024	Goiás	13	(0)
2024–2025	Apollon Limassol	32	(0)
- * Club domestic league appearances and goals as of 09:02, 19 May 2025 (UTC)

Bruno Araújo dos Santos (born 7 February 1993), simply known as Bruno Santos, is a Brazilian professional footballer who plays as a right-back.

== Career ==
Born in Rio de Janeiro, Brazil, Bruno Santos started his first experience abroad when he signed for Campeonato Nacional de Seniores side Sourense in the summer of 2013. One year later, he moved to Freamunde.

On 29 June 2015, Bruno Santos signed a three-year deal with Paços de Ferreira.

== Career statistics ==
=== Club ===
As of match played 25 August 2024

Appearances and goals by club, season and competition
Club	Season	League			State League		National cup		Continental		Other		Total	
Club	Season	Division	Apps	Goals	Apps	Goals	Apps	Goals	Apps	Goals	Apps	Goals	Apps	Goals
Sourense	2013-14	Campeonato Nacional de Seniores	14	0	—		—		—		—		14	0
Freamunde	2014-15	Segunda Liga	19	2	—		1	0	—		1 (Note: Appearance(s) in Taça da Liga)	0	21	2
Paços de Ferreira	2015-16	Primeira Liga	15	0	—		1	0	—		4	0	20	0
Paços de Ferreira	2016-17	Primeira Liga	29	0	—		—		—		2	0	31	0
Paços de Ferreira	2017-18	Primeira Liga	23	0	—		—		—		3	0	26	0
Paços de Ferreira	2018-19	LigaPro	27	1	—		2	0	—		2	0	31	1
Paços de Ferreira	2019-20	Primeira Liga	22	3	—		1	0	—		1	0	24	3
Paços de Ferreira	Total		116	4	—		4	0	—		12	0	132	4
AEL Limassol	2020-21	Cypriot First Division	28	1	—		4	1	—		—		32	2
AEL Limassol	2021-22	Cypriot First Division	22	2	—		4	2	4 (Note: Appearance(s) in UEFA Europa Conference League)	0	—		30	4
AEL Limassol	2022-23	Cypriot First Division	15	1	—		1	0	—		—		16	1
AEL Limassol	Total		65	4	—		9	3	4	0	—		78	7
Goiás	2023	Série A	8	0	5 (Note: Appearance(s) in Campeonato Goiano Primeira Divisão)	0	0	0	5 (Note: Appearance(s) in Copa Sudamericana)	0	4 (Note: Appearance(s) in Copa Verde)	0	22	0
Apollon Limassol	2023-24	Cypriot First Division	9	0	—		4	1	—		—		13	1
Apollon Limassol	2024-25	Cypriot First Division	1	0	—		—		—		—		1	0
Apollon Limassol	Total		10	0	—		4	1	—		—		14	1
Career Total			232	10	5	0	18	4	9	0	17	0	281	14

== Honours ==
=== Club ===
Goiás

- Copa Verde: 2023

Individual

- Primeira Liga Goal of the Month: June 2020
