= Diego Gonçalves =

Brazilian footballer (born 1994)

Personal information
- Full name: Diego Gonçalves
- Date of birth: 22 September 1994 (age 32)
- Place of birth: Guarujá, Brazil
- Height: 1.83 m (6 ft 0 in)
- Position: Forward

Team information
- Current team: Criciúma
- Number: 77

Youth career
- 2011: Ponte Preta
- 2012: Fluminense

Senior career*
Years	Team	Apps	(Gls)
2013	Olhanense	5	(0)
2014	Atlético CP	4	(0)
2015–2016	Portuguesa	12	(0)
2016–2018	Internacional	13	(1)
2018	→ Paraná (loan)	1	(0)
2018	→ Ventforet Kofu (loan)	11	(1)
2019	Ferroviária	9	(1)
2019	Londrina	3	(0)
2019–2020	Louletano	0	(0)
2019	→ Botafogo SP (loan)	8	(1)
2020	→ Figueirense (loan)	48	(11)
2021–2025	Mirassol	36	(3)
2021–2022	→ Botafogo (loan)	52	(12)
2023	→ Goiás (loan)	22	(3)
2024	→ Juventude (loan)	10	(1)
2025	→ Criciúma (loan)	37	(10)
2026–	Criciúma	16	(3)
- * Club domestic league appearances and goals as of 15 April 2026

Diego Gonçalves (born 22 September 1994), sometimes known as just Diego, is a Brazilian professional footballer who plays as a forward for Criciúma.

== Club career ==
Born in Guarujá, São Paulo, Diego Gonçalves played for AA Ponte Preta and Fluminense FC's youth systems, after starting it out at seven-a-side football with Gamma Esportes and AE Barra Funda. On 21 July 2013 he moved abroad for the first time in his career, joining Portuguese side S.C. Olhanense.

Diego Gonçalves made his professional debut on 17 August 2013, starting in a 0–2 away loss against Vitória S.C. in the Primeira Liga. He was regularly used under manager Abel Xavier, but after the arrival of Paulo Alves, he lost his starting spot and rescinded his link on 27 November.

On 26 January 2014 Diego Gonçalves went on a trial at Atlético Clube de Portugal, signing a contract shortly after. He left the side at the end of the campaign, after appearing sparingly.

On 5 January 2015 Diego Gonçalves signed for Portuguesa, freshly relegated to Série C. He made his debut for the club on 1 February, starting and scoring the first in a 3–2 away win against Ponte Preta for the Campeonato Paulista championship.

On 1 December 2015, Diego Gonçalves renewed his contract with Lusa for a further year. On 11 July 2016, however, he was released, and subsequently joined Internacional; initially assigned to the B-team, he was promoted to the main squad on 8 October by manager Celso Roth.

Diego Gonçalves made his Série A debut on 6 November 2016, replacing Aylon in a 0–1 away loss against Palmeiras.

== Career statistics ==
=== Club ===
As of 31 July 2024

Appearances and goals by club, season and competition
Club	Season	League			State league		National Cup		Continental		Other		Total	
Club	Season	Division	Apps	Goals	Apps	Goals	Apps	Goals	Apps	Goals	Apps	Goals	Apps	Goals
Olhanense	2013-14	Primeira Liga	5	0	—		1	0	—		1 (Note: Appearance(s) in Taça da Liga)	0	7	0
Atlético CP	2013-14	Segunda Liga	4	0	—		—		—		—		4	0
Portuguesa	2015	Série C	5	0	13 (Note: Appearance(s) in Campeonato Paulista Série A1)	3	2	1	—		—		20	4
Portuguesa	2016	Série C	7	0	19 (Note: Appearance(s) in Campeonato Paulista Série A2)	2	4	1	—		—		30	3
Portuguesa	Total		12	0	32	5	6	2	—		—		50	7
Internacional	2016	Série A	1	0	—		—		—		—		1	0
Internacional	2017	Série B	12	1	5 (Note: Appearance(s) in Campeonato Gaúcho Série A1)	0	2	0	—		2 (Note: Appearance(s) in Primeira Liga)	1	21	2
Internacional	Total		13	1	5	0	2	0	—		2	1	22	2
Paraná (loan)	2018	Série A	1	0	9 (Note: Appearance(s) in Campeonato Paranaense)	4	1	0	—		—		11	4
Ventforet Kofu (loan)	2018	J2 League	11	1	—		1	0	—		1 (Note: Appearance(s) in J.League Cup)	0	13	1
Ferroviária	2019	Série D	—		9	1	—		—		—		9	1
Londrina	2019	Série B	2	0	—		1	0	—		—		3	0
Botafogo SP (loan)	2019	Série B	8	1	—		—		—		—		8	1
Figueirense (loan)	2020	Série B	34	6	10 (Note: Appearance(s) in Campeonato Catarinense Série A)	3	4	2	—		—		48	11
Mirassol	2021	Série C	—		13	3	1	0	—		—		14	3
Mirassol	2024	Série B	5	0	11	0	—		—		—		16	0
Mirassol	Total		5	0	24	3	1	0	—		—		30	3
Botafogo (loan)	2021	Série B	32	8	—		—		—		—		32	8
Botafogo (loan)	2022	Série A	10	2	6 (Note: Appearance(s) in Campeonato Carioca Série A1)	2	4	0	—		—		20	4
Botafogo (loan)	Total		42	10	6	2	4	0	—		—		52	12
Goiás (loan)	2023	Série A	10	0	12 (Note: Appearance(s) in Campeonato Goiano)	3	2	0	3 (Note: Appearance(s) in Copa Sudamericana)	0	3 (Note: Appearance(s) in Copa Verde)	0	30	2
Juventude (loan)	2024	Série A	1	0	—		0	0	—		—		1	0
Career Total			148	19	107	21	23	4	3	0	7	1	288	45

== Honours ==
=== Club ===
Goiás

- Copa Verde: 2023

Botafogo

- Campeonato Brasileiro Série B: 2021
