= Hugo (footballer, born 1997) =

Brazilian footballer

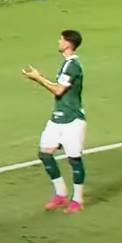
- Hugo playing for Goiás in 2021

Personal information
- Full name: Hugo Ferreira de Farias
- Date of birth: 29 August 1997 (age 29)
- Place of birth: Arapiraca, Brazil
- Height: 1.79 m (5 ft 10 in)
- Position: Left back

Team information
- Current team: Corinthians
- Number: 46

Youth career
- 2016–2017: CRB

Senior career*
Years	Team	Apps	(Gls)
2018–2019	Jaciobá	15	(2)
2019	→ ABC (loan)	5	(0)
2020–2021	CRB	22	(0)
2021–2023	Goiás	72	(3)
2024–	Corinthians	57	(0)
- * Club domestic league appearances and goals as of 14:53, 5 February 2026 (UTC)

Hugo Ferreira de Farias (born 29 August 1997), simply known as Hugo, is a Brazilian footballer who plays as a left back for Corinthians.

== Career ==
=== Early career ===
Hugo was born in Arapiraca, Alagoas, and was a CRB youth graduate. In 2018, he joined Jaciobá, and made his senior debut in the year's Campeonato Alagoano Segunda Divisão.

On 1 May 2019, Hugo joined ABC on loan for two years. On 13 November, after just five matches for the club, his loan was cut short.

In January 2020, Hugo returned to his former side CRB. A backup option to Guilherme Romão, he left the club in May 2021.

=== Goiás ===
On 18 May 2021, Hugo was announced at fellow Série B side Goiás. A regular starter, he scored two goals as the club achieved promotion to the Série A.

Hugo made his top tier debut on 10 April 2022, starting in a 2–0 away loss to Coritiba. He scored his first goal in the category on 18 October 2023, netting the opener in a 2–0 home win over São Paulo.

=== Corinthians ===
On 11 January 2024, Hugo was announced at Corinthians on a three-year deal.

== Career statistics ==
As of 5 February 2026

Club	Season	League			State League		Cup		Continental		Other		Total	
Club	Season	Division	Apps	Goals	Apps	Goals	Apps	Goals	Apps	Goals	Apps	Goals	Apps	Goals
Jaciobá	2018	Alagoano 2ª Divisão	—		5	0	—		—		—		5	0
Jaciobá	2019	Alagoano	—		10	2	—		—		—		10	2
Jaciobá	Total		—		15	2	—		—		—		15	2
ABC (loan)	2019	Série C	5	0	—		—		—		—		5	0
CRB	2020	Série B	15	0	1	0	1	0	—		2 (Note: Appearance(s) in Copa do Nordeste)	0	19	0
CRB	2021	Série B	0	0	6	0	1	0	—		3	0	10	0
CRB	Total		15	0	7	0	2	0	—		5	0	29	0
Goiás	2021	Série B	25	2	—		—		—		—		25	2
Goiás	2022	Série A	15	0	5	0	0	0	—		—		20	0
Goiás	2023	Série A	19	1	8	0	1	0	7 (Note: Appearance(s) in Copa Sudamericana)	0	6 (Note: Appearance(s) in Copa Verde)	0	41	1
Goiás	Total		59	3	13	0	1	0	7	0	6	0	86	3
Corinthians	2024	Série A	25	0	12	0	6	0	8	0	—		51	0
Corinthians	2025	Série A	10	0	7	0	0	0	3	0	—		20	0
Corinthians	2026	Série A	0	0	3	0	0	0	0	0	—		3	0
Corinthians	Total		35	0	22	0	6	0	11	0	0	0	74	0
Career total			114	3	57	2	9	0	18	0	11	0	209	5

== Honours ==
Jaciobá

- Campeonato Alagoano Segunda Divisão: 2018

CRB

- Campeonato Alagoano: 2020

Goiás

- Copa Verde: 2023

Corinthians

- Campeonato Paulista: 2025
- Copa do Brasil: 2025
- Supercopa do Brasil: 2026
