= Simón Contreras =

Chilean footballer (born 2002)

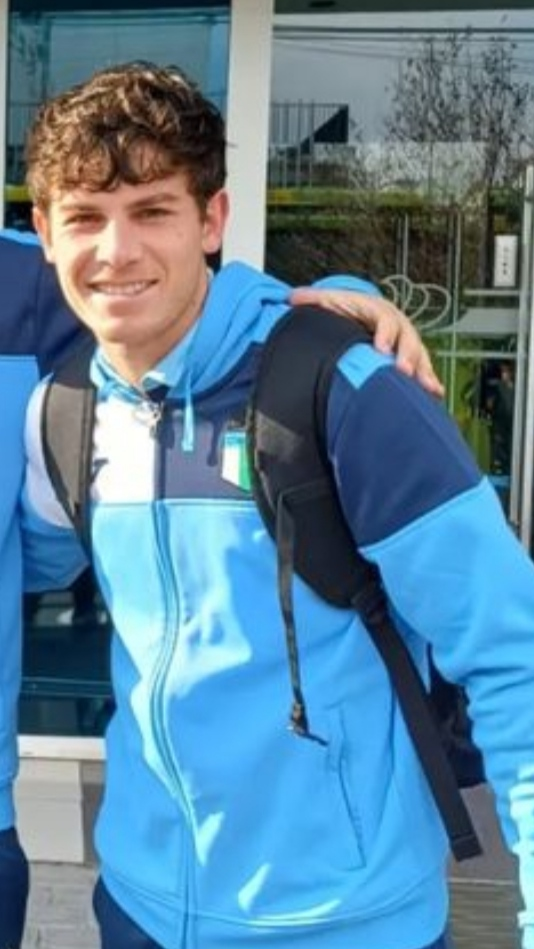
- Contreras with O'Higgins in 2024.

Personal information
- Full name: Simón Alberto Contreras Valenzuela
- Date of birth: 29 March 2002 (age 24)
- Place of birth: Peñalolén, Santiago, Chile
- Height: 1.78 m (5 ft 10 in)
- Position: Winger

Team information
- Current team: Deportes Iquique

Youth career
- 2013–2020: Universidad de Chile

Senior career*
Years	Team	Apps	(Gls)
2020–2023	Universidad de Chile	29	(1)
2022	→ Universidad de Concepción (loan)	14	(0)
2023	→ Magallanes (loan)	22	(1)
2024	O'Higgins	11	(2)
2025	Brusque	1	(0)
2025	Deportes Santa Cruz	13	(1)
2026–	Deportes Iquique	0	(0)

International career^{‡}
2020	Chile U20	2	(0)
- * Club domestic league appearances and goals as of 24 December 2025 ‡ National team caps and goals as of 18 December 2020

Simón Alberto Contreras Valenzuela (born 29 March 2002) is a Chilean footballer who plays as a winger for Deportes Iquique.

== Club career ==
In the 2020 season, he made his professional debut playing for Universidad de Chile in a Primera División match against Deportes La Serena. Later, he signed his first contract as a professional footballer on January 11, 2021.

In the second half of 2022, Contreras was loaned to Universidad de Concepción in the Primera B de Chile.

He ended his contract with Universidad de Chile after playing on loan for Magallanes in 2023.

In 2024, Contreras joined O'Higgins.

In February 2025, Contreras moved abroad and signed with Brazilian Série C club Brusque on a deal until the end of the season. He returned to Chile in June of the same year and signed with Deportes Santa Cruz.

In December 2025, Contreras joined Deportes Iquique.

== International career ==
He represented Chile U20 in a friendly tournament played in Teresópolis (Brazil) called Granja Comary International Tournament. At these tournament, he played in two matches against Peru U20 and Brazil U20.

== Personal life ==
Contreras is nicknamed Pitu.

He is cousin of the members of the Chilean dancing duo Power Peralta.
