= Julián Palacios (footballer) =

Argentine footballer

Personal information
- Date of birth: 4 February 1999 (age 27)
- Place of birth: General Pico, Argentina
- Height: 1.72 m (5 ft 8 in)
- Position: Midfielder

Team information
- Current team: Unión Santa Fe
- Number: 20

Youth career
- San Lorenzo

Senior career*
Years	Team	Apps	(Gls)
2019–2025	San Lorenzo	33	(1)
2022	→ Banfield (loan)	21	(1)
2023	→ Goiás (loan)	49	(3)
2024	→ Asteras Tripolis (loan)	20	(0)
2025–	Unión Santa Fe	61	(4)
- * Club domestic league appearances and goals as of 17:28, 22 November 2026 (UTC)

Julián Eduardo Palacios (born 4 February 1999) is an Argentine professional footballer who plays as a midfielder for Unión Santa Fe. He is the brother of fellow footballer Matías Palacios.

== Career ==
=== San Lorenzo ===
==== Goiás (loan) ====
On 28 December 2022 Campeonato Brasileiro Série A club Goiás signed Palacios from San Lorenzo on a one-year loan, his first experience abroad.

== Career statistics ==
=== Club ===
As of 11 January 2023

Club	Season	League			Cup		League Cup		Continental		Other		Total	
Club	Season	Division	Apps	Goals	Apps	Goals	Apps	Goals	Apps	Goals	Apps	Goals	Apps	Goals
San Lorenzo	2019–20	Argentine Primera División	10	1	–		–		–		–		10	1
San Lorenzo	2020–21	Argentine Primera División	4	0	–		–		–		–		4	0
San Lorenzo	2021	Argentine Primera División	19	0	1	0	–		7 (Note: Three appearances in Copa Libertadores, four appearances in Copa Sudamericana.)	0	–		27	0
San Lorenzo	Total		33	1	1	0	0	0	7	0	0	0	41	1
Banfield (loan)	2022	Argentine Primera División	21	1	4	0	–		5 (Note: Appearance(s) in Copa Sudamericana.)	0	–		30	1
Goiás (loan)	2022	Série A	0	0	0	0	–		–		0	0	0	0
Career total			43	2	5	0	0	0	12	0	0	0	71	1

== Honours ==
Goiás

- Copa Verde: 2023
