= Jhonny Lucas =

Brazilian footballer

Personal information
- Full name: Jhonny Lucas Flora Barbosa
- Date of birth: 21 February 2000 (age 26)
- Place of birth: Curitiba, Brazil
- Height: 1.70 m (5 ft 7 in)
- Position: Midfielder

Team information
- Current team: Amazonas
- Number: 8

Youth career
- 2012–2017: Paraná

Senior career*
Years	Team	Apps	(Gls)
2017–2019	Paraná	31	(2)
2019–2022	Sint-Truiden	3	(0)
2021–2022	→ Londrina (loan)	46	(2)
2023–2024	Goiás	25	(0)
2023	→ Vitória (loan)	5	(0)
2025–	Ponte Preta	0	(0)
2025	Brusque	1	(0)
2026–	Amazonas	15	(0)

International career^{‡}
2018	Brazil U20	1	(0)
- * Club domestic league appearances and goals as of 10 November 2026 ‡ National team caps and goals as of 8 January 2020

Jhonny Lucas Flora Barbosa (born 21 February 2000), commonly known as Jhonny Lucas, is a Brazilian footballer who plays as a midfielder for Amazonas.

== Club career ==
On 21 August 2019 he signed with Belgian First Division A club Sint-Truiden.

== Career statistics ==
=== Club ===
As of 8 January 2020.

Club	Season	League			State League		Cup		Continental		Other		Total	
Club	Season	Division	Apps	Goals	Apps	Goals	Apps	Goals	Apps	Goals	Apps	Goals	Apps	Goals
Paraná	2017	Série B	1	0	0	0	0	0	0	0	0	0	1	0
Paraná	2018	Série A	21	2	5 (Note: Appearances in the Campeonato Paranaense)	0	0	0	0	0	0	0	26	2
Paraná	2019	Série B	2	0	2	0	0	0	0	0	0	0	4	0
Paraná	Total		24	2	7	0	0	0	0	0	0	0	31	2
Sint-Truiden	2019–20	Jupiler Pro League	0	0	–		0	0	0	0	0	0	0	0
Career total			24	2	7	0	0	0	0	0	0	0	31	2

== Honours ==
=== Club ===
Goiás

- Copa Verde: 2023
