= Willian Oliveira =

Brazilian footballer

Personal information
- Full name: Willian Osmar de Oliveira Silva
- Date of birth: 16 May 1993 (age 33)
- Place of birth: Junqueirópolis, Brazil
- Height: 1.84 m (6 ft 1/2 in)
- Position: Defensive midfielder

Team information
- Current team: Sport Recife
- Number: 29

Youth career
- Madureira
- Paraná
- 2011–2013: Fluminense

Senior career*
Years	Team	Apps	(Gls)
2013–2018	Fluminense	12	(0)
2014–2015	→ Sport Recife (loan)	8	(0)
2016	→ Goiás (loan)	23	(0)
2017	→ Mirassol (loan)	14	(1)
2017	→ América Mineiro (loan)	9	(0)
2018	→ Botafogo-SP (loan)	8	(0)
2018	→ Guarani (loan)	25	(0)
2019–2020	Botafogo-SP	32	(3)
2020–2021	Chapecoense	39	(0)
2021–2022	Ceará	8	(0)
2022	→ Cruzeiro (loan)	37	(2)
2023	Goiás	46	(1)
2024–2025	Vitória	75	(7)
2026	Coritiba	15	(0)
2026–	Sport Recife	15	(0)
- * Club domestic league appearances and goals as of 16 November 2026

Willian Osmar de Oliveira Silva (born 16 May 1993), known as Willian Oliveira or just Willian, is a Brazilian footballer who plays as a defensive midfielder for Sport Recife.

== Career statistics ==
As of match played 5 February 2025

Appearances and goals by club, season and competition
Club	Season	League			State league		Copa do Brasil		Continetnal		Other		Total	
Club	Season	Division	Apps	Goals	Apps	Goals	Apps	Goals	Apps	Goals	Apps	Goals	Apps	Goals
Fluminense	2012	Série A	0	0	0	0	0	0	0	0	—		0	0
Fluminense	2013	Série A	8	0	0	0	2	0	0	0	—		10	0
Fluminense	2014	Série A	0	0	4 (Note: Appearance(s) in Campeonato Carioca)	0	0	0	0	0	—		4	0
Fluminense	2015	Série A	0	0	0	0	0	0	—		—		0	0
Fluminense	2016	Série A	0	0	0	0	0	0	—		—		0	0
Fluminense	2017	Série A	0	0	0	0	0	0	0	0	—		0	0
Fluminense	2018	Série A	0	0	0	0	0	0	0	0	—		0	0
Fluminense	Total		8	0	4	0	2	0	0	0	0	0	14	0
Sport Recife (Loan)	2014	Série A	7	0	0	0	1	0	0	0	0	0	8	0
Sport Recife (Loan)	2015	Série A	0	0	1 (Note: Appearance(s) in Campeonato Pernambucano)	0	1	0	0	0	0	0	2	0
Sport Recife (Loan)	Total		7	0	1	0	2	0	0	0	0	0	10	0
Goiás (loan)	2016	Série B	14	0	9 (Note: Appearance(s) in Campeonato Goiano)	0	0	0	—		—		23	0
Mirassol (loan)	2017	—			14 (Note: Appearance(s) in Campeonato Paulista)	1	—		—		—		14	1
América Mineiro (loan)	2017	Série B	9	0	0	0	0	0	—		—		9	0
Botafogo-SP (loan)	2018	Série C	0	0	8	0	—		—		—		8	0
Guarani (loan)	2018	Série B	25	0	0	0	—		—		—		25	0
Botafogo-SP	2019	Série B	14	0	14	3	—		—		—		28	3
Botafogo-SP	2020	Série B	0	0	4	0	—		—		—		4	0
Botafogo-SP	Total		14	0	18	3	0	0	0	0	0	0	32	3
Chapecoense	2020	Série B	36	0	3 (Note: Appearance(s) in Campeonato Catarinense)	0	0	0	—		—		39	0
Ceará (loan)	2021	Série A	5	0	3 (Note: Appearance(s) in Campeonato Cearense)	0	1	0	4 (Note: Appearance(s) in Copa do Nordeste)	0	9 (Note: Appearance(s) in Copa do Nordeste)	0	22	0
Ceará (loan)	2022	Série A	0	0	0	0	0	0	0	0	0	0	0	0
Ceará (loan)	Total		5	0	3	0	1	0	4	0	9	0	22	0
Cruzeiro (loan)	2022	Série B	27	2	10 (Note: Appearance(s) in Campeonato Mineiro)	0	6	0	—		—		43	2
Goiás	2023	Série A	31	0	15	1	0	0	4	0	5 (Note: Appearance(s) in Copa Verde)	0	55	1
Vitória	2024	Série A	35	5	13 (Note: Appearance(s) in Campeonato Baiano)	0	1	0	—		5	1	54	6
Vitória	2025	Série A	0	0	3	0	0	0	0	0	2	0	5	0
Vitória	Total		35	5	16	0	1	0	0	0	7	1	59	6
Career total			211	7	101	5	12	0	8	0	21	1	353	13

== Honours ==
Goiás

- Campeonato Goiano: 2016
- Copa Verde: 2023

Chapecoense

- Campeonato Catarinense: 2020
- Campeonato Brasileiro Série B: 2020
