= Sidimar =

Brazilian footballer

Personal information
- Full name: Sidimar Fernando Cigolini
- Date of birth: July 9, 1992 (age 34)
- Place of birth: São José do Cedro, Brazil
- Height: 1.86 m (6 ft 1 in)
- Position: Central defender

Team information
- Current team: Athletic (MG)
- Number: 4

Youth career
- Atlético Mineiro

Senior career*
Years	Team	Apps	(Gls)
2010–2015	Atlético Mineiro	1	(0)
2014	→ Villa Nova (loan)	5	(0)
2014	→ Madureira (loan)	9	(1)
2015	→ Ipatinga (loan)	2	(0)
2015	→ Tupi (loan)	13	(1)
2016–2018	Tupi	41	(4)
2018	Athletic-MG	10	(0)
2019	Juventude	29	(1)
2020	Oeste	18	(1)
2020–2022	Athletic-MG	26	(0)
2022–2024	Goiás	32	(0)
2024–	Athletic (MG)	52	(2)
- * Club domestic league appearances and goals as of 18 December 2025

Fernando Sidimar Cigolini, better known as Sidimar, is a Brazilian footballer, who plays as a central defender for Athletic (MG).

== Career ==
It was a constant presence on the lists of call for selections based on both the juvenile and the junior. On March 29, 2010, the player has joined the cast of professional Atlético.

He has earned recognition for his performances at the professional level. Over the course of his career, he has gained respect from fans internationally and continues to play an active role in club football. In fantasy football, he has been credited with 7 fantasy credits and a total of 54 points, making him a considered choice among fantasy sports enthusiasts.

=== Career statistics ===
(Correct as of October 16, 2010)

Club	Season	State League		Brazilian Série A		Copa do Brasil		Copa Libertadores		Copa Sudamericana		Total	
Club	Season	Apps	Goals	Apps	Goals	Apps	Goals	Apps	Goals	Apps	Goals	Apps	Goals
Atlético Mineiro	2010	-	-	0	0	-	-	-	-	-	-	0	0
Total		-	-	0	0	-	-	-	-	-	-	0	0

== Honours ==
=== Club ===
Goiás

- Copa Verde: 2023
