= Luis Segovia =

Ecuadorean footballer (born 1997)

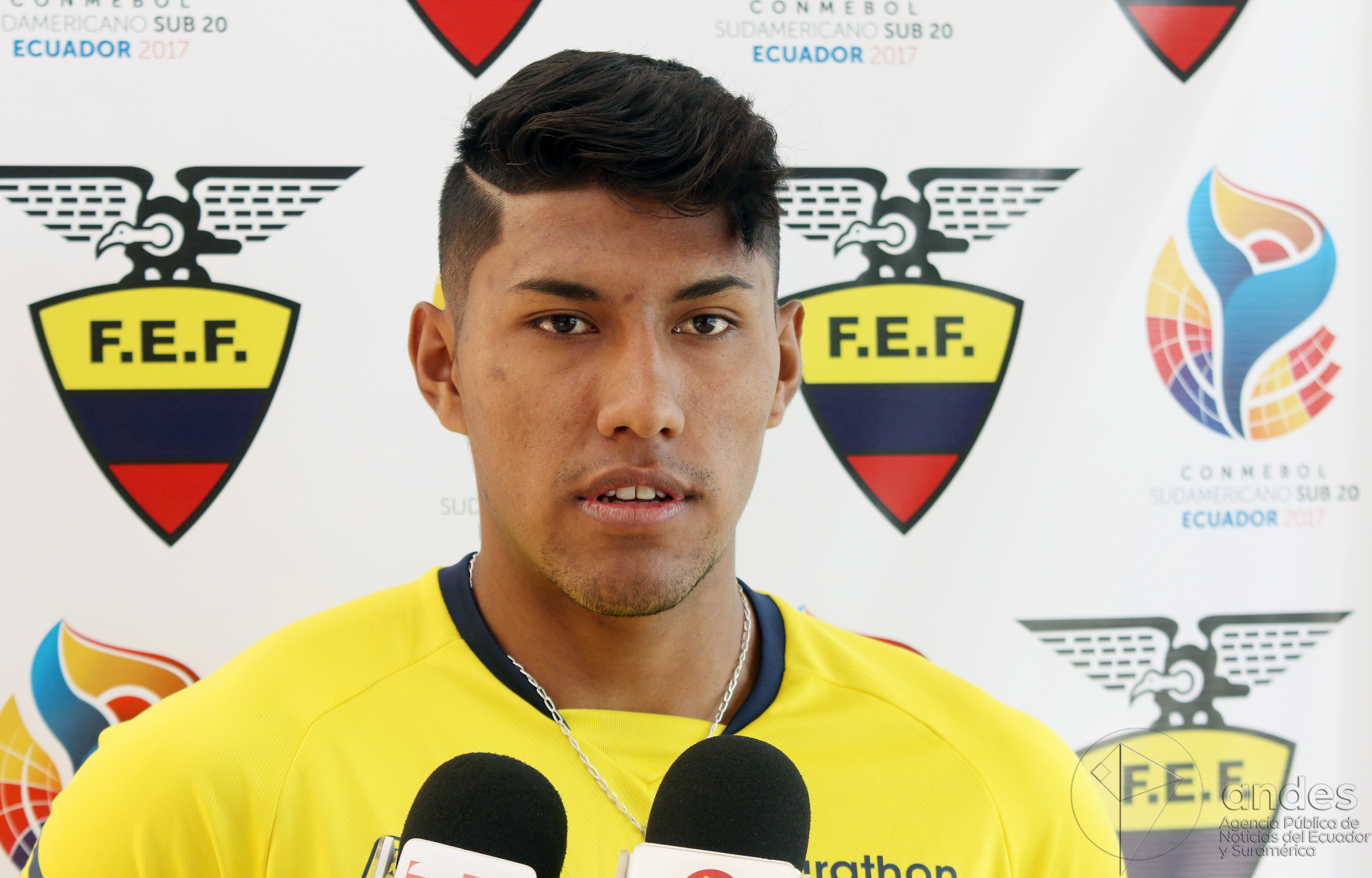
- Segovia with the Ecuador U-20 in 2017

Personal information
- Full name: Luis Geovanny Segovia Vega
- Date of birth: 26 October 1997 (age 29)
- Place of birth: Quito, Ecuador
- Height: 1.82 m (6 ft 0 in)
- Position: Centre-back

Team information
- Current team: LDU Quito
- Number: 4

Youth career
- 2009–2015: El Nacional b

Senior career*
Years	Team	Apps	(Gls)
2015–2019	El Nacional	105	(5)
2019–2022	Independiente del Valle	98	(6)
2023–2024	Botafogo	7	(0)
2023	→ RWD Molenbeek (loan)	13	(1)
2024	→ CRB (loan)	13	(1)
2025–2025	CRB	27	(1)
2026–	LDU	13	(1)

International career^{‡}
2017	Ecuador U20	10	(0)
2020	Ecuador U23	3	(0)
2021–	Ecuador	1	(0)
- * Club domestic league appearances and goals as of 27 May 2026 ‡ National team caps and goals as of 27 October 2021

Luis Geovanny Segovia Vega, known as Luis Segovia (born 26 October 1997), is an Ecuadorian professional footballer who plays as a centre-back for LDU Quito and the Ecuador national team.

== Club career ==
Segovia made his debut for El Nacional in 2015 and went in to make 105 appearances at centre back before being signed by Independiente del Valle on 24 January 2019 for a net value of $600,000. It was to be a successful season for Segovia and the club.

Alongside midfielder Alan Franco, Segovia was the only ever present starter in Independiente del Valle's unexpected 2019 Copa Sudamericana triumph. Segovia commented that whilst in lockdown during the COVID-19 pandemic he would rewatch the final on YouTube for motivation.

In February 2020, Segovia played in the Recopa Sudamericana, the annual continental Super Cup that pits the previous year's champions of the Copa Libertadores and the Copa Sudamericana, South America's premier club competitions, against each other. On this occasion Flamengo of Brazil triumphed on 26 February 2020 at the Maracanã in Rio de Janeiro, 5–2 on aggregate, to claim their first Recopa Sudamericana title. One Segovia back header inadvertently leading to a goal from striker Gabriel Barbosa.

=== International ===
Segovia represented Ecuador at the 2017 South American U-20 Championship and the 2017 FIFA U-20 World Cup.

He was part of the Ecuador U-23 squad that participated in the 2020 CONMEBOL Pre-Olympic Tournament, where it lost all the games and failed to qualify for the Tokyo Olympics.

He made his debut for the Ecuador national team on 27 October 2021 in a friendly against Mexico.

As of 27 October 2021

Ecuador
Year	Apps	Goals
2021	1	0
Total	1	0
