= Edu (footballer, born 2000) =

Brazilian association football player

Personal information
- Full name: Lucas Eduardo Ribeiro de Souza
- Date of birth: 16 June 2000 (age 26)
- Place of birth: Belo Horizonte, Brazil
- Height: 1.88 m (6 ft 2 in)
- Position: Centre back

Team information
- Current team: Vitória
- Number: 43

Youth career
- Cruzeiro

Senior career*
| Years | Team | Apps | (Gls) |
| 2020 | Cruzeiro | 2 | (0) |
| 2020–2023 | Athletico Paranaense | 4 | (0) |
| 2021 | → Remo (loan) | 0 | (0) |
| 2023 | → Goiás (loan) | 17 | (0) |
| 2024 | Goiás | 12 | (0) |
| 2024– | Vitória | 44 | (0) |
- * Club domestic league appearances and goals as of 8 April 2026

Lucas Eduardo Ribeiro de Souza (born 16 June 2000), commonly known as Edu, is a Brazilian footballer who plays as a centre-back for Vitória.

== Club career ==
=== Cruzeiro ===
Born in Belo Horizonte, Minas Gerais, Edu was a Cruzeiro youth graduate. In June 2019, he was called up to the main squad by manager Mano Menezes, after the club sold Murilo Cerqueira to FC Lokomotiv Moscow.

Edu made his professional debut on 22 January 2020, replacing Jadsom in the 58th minute of a 2–0 Campeonato Mineiro home win against Boa Esporte. He scored his first senior goal on 13 February, netting his team's first in a 2–2 away draw against São Raimundo-RR, for the year's Copa do Brasil; he was also sent off in that match.

=== Athletico Paranaense ===
On 5 June 2020, Edu joined Série A side Athletico Paranaense on a four-year deal, as a replacement to OGC Nice-bound Robson Bambu.

=== Achilles Tendon Rupture ===
Since March 2026, Edu has been suffering from an achilles tendon rupture.

== Career statistics ==
As of match played 11 February 2025

Appearances and goals by club, season and competition
| Club | Season | League | | | State league | | Copa do Brasil | | Continetnal | | Other | | Total | |
| Club | Season | Division | Apps | Goals | Apps | Goals | Apps | Goals | Apps | Goals | Apps | Goals | Apps | Goals |
|---|---|---|---|---|---|---|---|---|---|---|---|---|---|---|
| Cruzeiro | 2019 | Série A | 0 | 0 | 0 | 0 | 0 | 0 | 0 | 0 | — | | 0 | 0 |
| Cruzeiro | 2020 | Série B | 0 | 0 | 2 (Note: Appearance(s) in Campeonato Mineiro) | 0 | 1 | 1 | — | | — | | 3 | 1 |
| Cruzeiro | Total | | 0 | 0 | 2 | 0 | 1 | 1 | 0 | 0 | 0 | 0 | 3 | 1 |
| Athletico Paranaense | 2020 | Série A | 0 | 0 | 0 | 0 | 0 | 0 | 0 | 0 | — | | 0 | 0 |
| Athletico Paranaense | 2021 | Série A | 0 | 0 | 3 (Note: Appearance(s) in Campeonato Paranaense) | 0 | 0 | 0 | 0 | 0 | — | | 3 | 0 |
| Athletico Paranaense | 2022 | Série A | 0 | 0 | 1 | 0 | 0 | 0 | 0 | 0 | — | | 1 | 0 |
| Athletico Paranaense | 2023 | Série A | 0 | 0 | 0 | 0 | 0 | 0 | 0 | 0 | — | | 0 | 0 |
| Athletico Paranaense | Total | | 0 | 0 | 4 | 0 | 0 | 0 | 0 | 0 | 0 | 0 | 4 | 0 |
| Remo (loan) | 2021 | Série B | 0 | 0 | 0 | 0 | 0 | 0 | — | | 1 (Note: Appearance(s) in Copa Verde) | 1 | 1 | 1 |
| Goiás (loan) | 2023 | Série A | 9 | 0 | 8 (Note: Appearance(s) in Campeonato Goiano) | 0 | 0 | 0 | 4 (Note: Appearance(s) in Copa Sudamericana) | 0 | 2 | 0 | 23 | 0 |
| Goiás | 2024 | Série B | 0 | 0 | 9 | 0 | 0 | 0 | — | | 3 | 0 | 12 | 0 |
| Vitória | 2024 | Série A | 12 | 0 | 0 | 0 | 0 | 0 | — | | 0 | 0 | 12 | 0 |
| Vitória | 2025 | Série A | 0 | 0 | 3 (Note: Appearance(s) in Campeonato Baiano) | 0 | 0 | 0 | 0 | 0 | 0 | 0 | 3 | 0 |
| Vitória | Total | | 12 | 0 | 3 | 0 | 0 | 0 | 0 | 0 | 0 | 0 | 15 | 0 |
| Career total | | | 21 | 0 | 26 | 0 | 1 | 1 | 4 | 0 | 6 | 1 | 58 | 2 |

== Honours ==
Goiás

- Copa Verde: 2023
