= Diego Loureiro =

Brazilian footballer (born 1998)

Personal information
- Full name: Diego Terra Loureiro
- Date of birth: 28 July 1998 (age 28)
- Place of birth: Rio de Janeiro, Brazil
- Height: 1.90 m (6 ft 3 in)
- Position: Goalkeeper

Youth career
- –2018: Botafogo

Senior career*
Years	Team	Apps	(Gls)
2018–2024	Botafogo	43	(0)
2022–2023	→ Atlético Goianiense (loan)	7	(0)
- * Club domestic league appearances and goals as of 21:01 agosto of 2022 (UTC)

Diego Terra Loureiro (born 28 July 1998), sometimes known as just Diego Loureiro, is a Brazilian footballer who plays as a goalkeeper.

== Career statistics ==
=== Club ===
As of 16 September 2021.

Club	Season	League			State league		Cup		Continental		Other		Total	
Club	Season	Division	Apps	Goals	Apps	Goals	Apps	Goals	Apps	Goals	Apps	Goals	Apps	Goals
Botafogo	2018	Série A	1	0	0	0	0	0	1 (Note: Appearances in the Copa Sudamericana)	0	0	0	2	0
Botafogo	2019	Série A	0	0	0	0	0	0	0	0	0	0	0	0
Botafogo	2020	Série A	7	0	0	0	0	0	0	0	0	0	7	0
Botafogo	2021	Série B	14	0	1	0	0	0	0	0	0	0	15	0
Career total			22	0	1	0	0	0	1	0	0	0	24	0

== Honours ==
Botafogo

- Campeonato Brasileiro Série B: 2021
