= Matheus Peixoto =

Brazilian footballer

Personal information
- Full name: Matheus Vieira Campos Peixoto
- Date of birth: 16 November 1995 (age 30)
- Place of birth: Cabo Frio, Brazil
- Height: 1.90 m (6 ft 3 in)
- Position: Forward

Team information
- Current team: Júbilo Iwata
- Number: 11

Senior career*
Years	Team	Apps	(Gls)
2013–2015	Audax Rio	9	(0)
2015	→ Bahia (loan)	0	(0)
2016–2017	Bahia	1	(0)
2016	→ Ypiranga–BA (loan)	9	(4)
2016	→ Fluminense–BA (loan)	0	(0)
2017–2021	Red Bull Bragantino	78	(21)
2018	→ Sport Recife (loan)	8	(0)
2020	→ Ponte Preta (loan)	31	(5)
2021	→ Juventude (loan)	25	(11)
2021–2023	Metalist Kharkiv	16	(14)
2022	→ Ceará (loan)	13	(0)
2023	→ Goiás (loan)	20	(4)
2023	→ Atlético Goianiense (loan)	16	(4)
2024–	Jubilo Iwata	89	(21)
- * Club domestic league appearances and goals as of 14 August 2026

Matheus Vieira Campos Peixoto (born 16 November 1995) is a Brazilian professional footballer who plays as a forward for Júbilo Iwata.

== Career statistics ==
As of 10 May 2019

Appearances and goals by club, season and competition
Club	Season	League			State League		Cup		Continental		Other		Total	
Club	Season	Division	Apps	Goals	Apps	Goals	Apps	Goals	Apps	Goals	Apps	Goals	Apps	Goals
Audax Rio	2014	Carioca	—		1	0	—		—		—		1	0
Bahia	2017	Série A	0	0	1	0	—		—		1 (Note: Appearance(s) in Copa do Nordeste)	0	2	0
Bragantino	2017	Série C	6	1	—		—		—		—		6	1
Bragantino	2018	Série C	19	5	12	5	2	1	—		—		33	11
Bragantino	2019	Série B	—		14	4	—		—		—		14	4
Bragantino	Total		25	6	26	9	2	1	0	0	0	0	53	16
Sport	2018	Série A	8	0	—		—		—		—		8	0
Red Bull Bragantino	2019	Série B	3	1	—		—		—		—		3	1
Career total			36	7	28	9	2	1	0	0	1	0	67	17

== Honours ==
Bahia

- Copa do Nordeste: 2017

Red Bull Bragantino

- Campeonato Brasileiro Série B: 2019
- Campeonato Paulista Interior: 2020

Goiás

- Copa Verde: 2023
