= Philippe (footballer) =

Brazilian footballer

Personal information
- Full name: Philippe Almeida Costa
- Date of birth: 1 March 2000 (age 26)
- Place of birth: Goiânia, Brazil
- Height: 1.88 m (6 ft 2 in)
- Position: Forward

Team information
- Current team: Goiás
- Number: 90

Youth career
- 2015–2016: Campinas-GO
- 2016–2018: Vila Nova

Senior career*
Years	Team	Apps	(Gls)
2018	Vila Nova	8	(1)
2018–2021	Sion	7	(1)
2021	Al-Sharjah	3	(0)
2022	Grêmio Anápolis	4	(4)
2023–	Goiás	3	(0)
- * Club domestic league appearances and goals as of 18:33, 31 January 2023 (UTC)

Philippe Almeida Costa (born 1 March 2000), simply known as Philippe, is a Brazilian professional footballer who plays as a forward for Goiás.

== Professional career ==
Batata began playing senior football with Vila Nova Futebol Clube in the Campeonato Goiano in 2018. On 16 May 2018, Philippe signed with the Swiss club FC Sion. Philippe made his professional debut with FC Sion in a 4-2 Swiss Super League win over FC St. Gallen on 29 July 2018.

== Honours ==
=== Club ===
Goiás

- Copa Verde: 2023
