= Bruno Melo =

Brazilian footballer (born 1992)

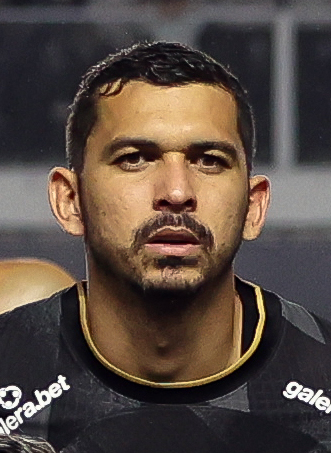

Personal information
- Full name: Bruno Ferreira Melo
- Date of birth: 26 October 1992 (age 34)
- Place of birth: Paracuru, Brazil
- Height: 1.83 m (6 ft 0 in)
- Position: Left back

Team information
- Current team: Coritiba
- Number: 26

Youth career
- 2010–2011: Fortaleza

Senior career*
Years	Team	Apps	(Gls)
2011–2024	Fortaleza	156	(26)
2011	→ Maracanã (loan)	5	(0)
2012	→ Quixadá (loan)	13	(3)
2012	→ Paracuru (loan)	7	(0)
2014	→ Quixadá (loan)	14	(1)
2014	→ Nova Russas (loan)	12	(3)
2014	→ Uniclinic (loan)	6	(1)
2022	→ Corinthians (loan)	13	(0)
2023	→ Goiás (loan)	54	(6)
2024	→ Coritiba (loan)	43	(3)
2025–	Coritiba	45	(2)
- * Club domestic league appearances and goals as of 7 April 2026

Bruno Ferreira Melo (born 26 October 1992), known as Bruno Melo, is a Brazilian professional footballer who plays as a left back for Coritiba.

== Club career ==
=== Fortaleza ===
==== Loan stints ====
Born in Paracuru, Ceará, Bruno was a Fortaleza youth graduate. For the 2011 season, he was loaned to Maracanã, and made his senior debut on 7 April of that year by starting in a 1–0 home win against Associação Desportiva São Benedito for the Campeonato Cearense Segunda Divisão championship.

After his loan expired, Bruno returned to Fortaleza and was assigned to the under-20 squad. Ahead of the 2012 campaign, he moved to Quixadá also in a temporary deal; on his debut on 10 March, he scored his team's second in a 2–1 away win against Limoeiro.

After another loan stint at Paracuru, Bruno returned to Fortaleza and was assigned to the main squad, but failed to make an appearance. In 2014, he served loans at Quixadá, Nova Russas and Uniclinic, winning the third division of the Cearense with the latter.

==== Breakthrough ====
Returning to Leão, Bruno made his debut for the club on 14 January 2015, starting in a 0–0 away draw against former side Quixadá for the year's Cearense. A backup for his first two seasons, he only started to appear regularly from the 2017 season onwards.

Bruno scored his first goals for Fortaleza on 4 March 2017, netting a brace in a 5–0 home routing of Itapipoca, also for the state league. He was also an undisputed starter for the year's Série C, contributing with six goals as his side returned to Série B after a nine-year absence; highlights included doubles in a 2–0 away win against Botafogo-PB and in a 2–2 draw at Sampaio Corrêa.

On 30 November 2017, Bruno renewed his contract until 2020. He made his debut in the second division the following 14 April, starting in a 2–1 home defeat of Guarani.

Bruno scored his first Série B goal on 18 April 2018, netting the opener through a penalty kick in a 2–0 away win against Boa Esporte. He finished the campaign with 30 appearances, all as a starter, and contributed with seven goals as his side achieved promotion to the Série A.

== Career statistics ==
As of 15 November 2021

Club	Season	League			State League		Cup		Continental		Other		Total	
Club	Season	Division	Apps	Goals	Apps	Goals	Apps	Goals	Apps	Goals	Apps	Goals	Apps	Goals
Fortaleza	2013	Série C	0	0	0	0	0	0	—		—		0	0
Fortaleza	2015	Série C	1	0	5	0	1	0	—		5 (Note: Appearance(s) in Copa Fares Lopes)	0	12	0
Fortaleza	2016	Série C	4	0	5	0	1	0	—		5 (Note: Two appearances in Copa do Nordeste, one appearance in Copa Fares Lopes, two appearances in Copa dos Campeões Cearenses)	0	15	0
Fortaleza	2017	Série C	22	6	7	2	0	0	—		5 (Note: Three appearances in Copa do Nordeste, two appearances in Copa Fares Lopes)	0	34	8
Fortaleza	2018	Série B	30	7	14	3	0	0	—		—		44	10
Fortaleza	2019	Série A	14	3	6	0	1	0	—		4 (Note: Appearance(s) in Copa do Nordeste)	0	25	3
Fortaleza	2020	Série A	24	2	6	2	2	0	2 (Note: Appearance(s) in Copa Sudamericana)	0	7	1	41	5
Fortaleza	2021	Série A	16	1	4	0	7	0	—		7	2	34	3
Fortaleza	Subtotal		111	19	45	7	12	0	2	0	33	3	203	29
Maracanã (loan)	2011	Cearense 2ª Divisão	—		5	0	—		—		—		5	0
Quixadá (loan)	2012	Cearense 2ª Divisão	—		13	3	—		—		—		13	3
Paracuru (loan)	2012	Cearense 3ª Divisão	—		7	0	—		—		—		7	0
Quixadá (loan)	2014	Cearense	—		14	1	—		—		—		14	1
Nova Russas (loan)	2014	Cearense 2ª Divisão	—		12	3	—		—		—		33	0
Uniclinic (loan)	2014	Cearense 3ª Divisão	—		6	1	—		—		—		6	1
Career total			111	19	102	15	12	0	2	0	33	3	260	37

== Honours ==
Uniclinic

- Campeonato Cearense Terceira Divisão: 2014

Fortaleza

- Campeonato Brasileiro Série B: 2018
- Campeonato Cearense: 2015, 2016, 2019, 2020, 2021
- Copa do Nordeste: 2019
- Copa dos Campeões Cearenses: 2016, 2017

Goiás

- Copa Verde: 2023
