= Maguinho =

Brazilian footballer

Personal information
- Full name: Magno José da Silva
- Date of birth: 6 January 1993 (age 33)
- Place of birth: Dores do Turvo, Brazil
- Height: 1.69 m (5 ft 7 in)
- Position: Right back

Team information
- Current team: Operário Ferroviário
- Number: 26

Youth career
- Tupi

Senior career*
Years	Team	Apps	(Gls)
2009–2014	Tupi	26	(2)
2015	América de Natal	15	(0)
2016	Capivariano	13	(1)
2016–2018	Vila Nova	97	(3)
2019	Kawasaki Frontale	8	(0)
2020–2021	Yokohama FC	48	(0)
2022–2023	Goiás	83	(3)
2024	Atlético Goianiense	33	(1)
2025	Ponte Preta	26	(1)
2025–2026	América Mineiro	10	(1)
2026–	Operário Ferroviário	21	(0)
- * Club domestic league appearances and goals as of 18 November 2026

Magno José da Silva (born 6 January 1993), commonly known as Maguinho, is a Brazilian professional footballer who plays for Operário Ferroviário as a right back.

== Club career ==
Born in Dores do Turvo, Maguinho made his senior debut with Tupi at the age of 16 and became the youngest player ever to play for the club. On 9 August 2014, he scored his first goal for the club in a 2–0 win against Macaé.

On 27 December 2014, Maguinho moved to América-RN for the upcoming season. On 8 October 2015, he rescinded his contract with the club although he received an offer of contract extension.

After a short stint with Capivariano in Campeonato Paulista, Maguinho joined Vila Nova on a one-year contract on 25 April 2016. On 13 December, his contract was extended until 2018. On 21 November 2018, it was announced that he would leave the club at the end of the season.

On 31 December 2018, Maguinho moved abroad and joined Japanese club Kawasaki Frontale, on a contract running until 1 January 2020. It was announced on 30 December 2019 that he had joined newly promoted Yokohama FC.

== Career statistics ==
As of match played on 31 December 2021

Club	Season	League			State League		Cup		League Cup		Continental		Other		Total	
Club	Season	Division	Apps	Goals	Apps	Goals	Apps	Goals	Apps	Goals	Apps	Goals	Apps	Goals	Apps	Goals
Tupi	2010	Série D	2	0	0	0	0	0	—		—		—		2	0
Tupi	2011	Série D	0	0	0	0	0	0	—		—		—		0	0
Tupi	2012	Série C	2	0	2	0	0	0	—		—		—		4	0
Tupi	2013	Série D	5	0	8	0	2	0	—		—		—		15	0
Tupi	2014	Série C	17	2	10	0	2	0	—		—		—		29	2
Tupi	Total		26	2	20	0	4	0	0	0	0	0	0	0	50	2
América de Natal	2016	Série C	15	0	10	0	3	0	—		—		7 (Note: Appearances in Copa do Nordeste)	0	35	0
Capivariano	2016	Paulista A1	—		13	1	0	0	—		—		—		13	1
Vila Nova	2016	Série B	32	1	0	0	0	0	—		—		—		32	1
Vila Nova	2017	Série B	35	1	16	0	2	0	—		—		—		53	1
Vila Nova	2018	Série B	30	1	12	3	4	0	—		—		—		46	4
Vila Nova	Total		97	3	28	3	6	0	0	0	0	0	0	0	131	6
Kawasaki Frontale	2019	J1 League	8	2	—		2	0	1	0	2	0	1 (Note: Appearance in Japanese Super Cup)	0	14	2
Yokohama FC	2020	J1 League	24	0	—		—		1	0	—		—		25	0
Yokohama FC	2021	J1 League	24	0	—		0	0	4	0	—		—		28	0
Yokohama FC	Total		48	0	0	0	0	0	5	0	0	0	0	0	53	0
Career total			194	5	71	13	15	0	6	0	2	0	8	0	296	18

== Honours ==
=== Club ===
Kawasaki Frontale

- J.League Cup (1) : 2019
- Japanese Super Cup (1) : 2019

Goiás

- Copa Verde: 2023
