= 2023 Copa Verde =

10th edition of a Brazilian association football competition

Tournament details
- Country: Brazil
- Dates: 17 February – 31 May
- Teams: 24

Final positions
- Champions: Goiás (1st title)
- Runners-up: (Pará) Paysandu

Tournament statistics
- Matches played: 30
- Goals scored: 73 (2.43 per match)
- Top goal scorer(s): (Brazil) Wanderson (4 goals)

The 2023 Copa Verde was the tenth edition of the football competition held in Brazil. Featuring 24 clubs, Acre, Amazonas, Distrito Federal, Espírito Santo, Mato Grosso, Pará and Tocantins have two vacancies; Amapá, Goiás, Mato Grosso do Sul, Rondônia and Roraima with one each. The others five berths was set according to CBF ranking.

In the finals, Goiás defeated Paysandu 4–1 on aggregate to win their first title and a place in the third round of the 2024 Copa do Brasil.

== Qualified teams ==
Association	Team	Qualification method
(Acre (state)) Acre; 2+2 berths	Humaitá	2022 Campeonato Acreano champions
(Acre (state)) Acre; 2+2 berths	São Francisco	2022 Campeonato Acreano runners-up
(Acre (state)) Acre; 2+2 berths	Atlético Acreano	3rd best placed team in the 2023 CBF ranking not already qualified
(Acre (state)) Acre; 2+2 berths	Rio Branco	4th best placed team in the 2023 CBF ranking not already qualified
(Amapá) Amapá; 1 berth	Trem	2022 Campeonato Amapaense champions
(Amazonas (Brazilian state)) Amazonas; 2 berths	Manaus	2022 Campeonato Amazonense champions
(Amazonas (Brazilian state)) Amazonas; 2 berths	Princesa do Solimões	2022 Campeonato Amazonense runners-up
(Federal District (Brazil)) Distrito Federal; 2 berths	Brasiliense	2022 Campeonato Brasiliense champions
(Federal District (Brazil)) Distrito Federal; 2 berths	Ceilândia	2022 Campeonato Brasiliense runners-up
(Espírito Santo) Espírito Santo; 2 berths	Real Noroeste	2022 Campeonato Capixaba champions
(Espírito Santo) Espírito Santo; 2 berths	Rio Branco	2022 Copa Espírito Santo runners-up
(Goiás) Goiás; 1+1 berths	Goiás	2022 Campeonato Goiano runners-up
(Goiás) Goiás; 1+1 berths	Vila Nova	1st best placed team in the 2023 CBF ranking not already qualified
(Mato Grosso) Mato Grosso; 2+1 berths	Cuiabá	2022 Campeonato Mato-Grossense champions
(Mato Grosso) Mato Grosso; 2+1 berths	União Rondonópolis	2022 Campeonato Mato-Grossense runners-up
(Mato Grosso) Mato Grosso; 2+1 berths	Luverdense	2nd best placed team in the 2023 CBF ranking not already qualified
(Mato Grosso do Sul) Mato Grosso do Sul; 1 berth	Operário	2022 Campeonato Sul-Mato-Grossense champions
(Pará) Pará; 2+1 berths	Remo	2022 Campeonato Paraense champions
(Pará) Pará; 2+1 berths	Paysandu	2022 Campeonato Paraense runners-up
(Pará) Pará; 2+1 berths	Castanhal	5th best placed team in the 2023 CBF ranking not already qualified
(Rondônia) Rondônia; 1 berth	Real Ariquemes	2022 Campeonato Rondoniense champions
(Roraima) Roraima; 1 berth	São Raimundo	2022 Campeonato Roraimense champions
(Tocantins) Tocantins; 2 berths	Tocantinópolis	2022 Campeonato Tocantinense champions
(Tocantins) Tocantins; 2 berths	Interporto	2022 Campeonato Tocantinense runners-up

== Schedule ==
The schedule of the competition is as follows.

Stage	First leg	Second leg
First round	17, 18 and 19 February 2023	
Round of 16	22 and 23 February and 1 March 2023	
Quarter-finals	8 and 15 March 2023	22 and 23 March 2023
Semi-finals	26 March 2023	29 March 2023
Finals	17 May 2023	31 May 2023

== Bracket ==
First round
(Acre (state)) Rio Branco	0
(Amazonas (Brazilian state)) Princesa do Solimões	1
(Pará) Castanhal	2
(Rondônia) Real Ariquemes	3
(Acre (state)) Atlético Acreano	3
(Acre (state)) São Francisco	6
(Acre (state)) Humaitá	2
(Amapá) Trem	0
(Mato Grosso) Luverdense	2
(Tocantins) Interporto	1
(Federal District (Brazil)) Ceilândia	1
(Espírito Santo) Rio Branco	0
(Tocantins) Tocantinópolis (p)	1 (5)
(Mato Grosso do Sul) Operário	1 (4)
(Mato Grosso) União Rondonópolis	1
(Espírito Santo) Real Noroeste	0

Round of 16
(Amazonas (Brazilian state)) Manaus	0
(Amazonas (Brazilian state)) Princesa do Solimões	2
(Pará) Paysandu	3
(Rondônia) Real Ariquemes	0
(Roraima) São Raimundo	6
(Acre (state)) São Francisco	0
(Pará) Remo	4
(Acre (state)) Humaitá	1
(Goiás) Vila Nova (p)	0 (4)
(Mato Grosso) Luverdense	0 (3)
(Mato Grosso) Cuiabá	3
(Federal District (Brazil)) Ceilândia	0
(Federal District (Brazil)) Brasiliense	4
(Tocantins) Tocantinópolis	2
Goiás	3
(Mato Grosso) União Rondonópolis	0

Quarter-finals
(Amazonas (Brazilian state)) Princesa do Solimões	0	0	0 (3)
(Pará) Paysandu (p)	0	0	0 (5)
(Roraima) São Raimundo	1	0	1
(Pará) Remo	0	3	3
(Goiás) Vila Nova	0	1	1
(Mato Grosso) Cuiabá	2	1	3
(Federal District (Brazil)) Brasiliense	0	0	0
Goiás	0	1	1

Semi-finals
(Pará) Paysandu (p)	0	2	2 (4)
(Pará) Remo	1	1	2 (2)
(Mato Grosso) Cuiabá	1	0	1
Goiás	0	2	2

Finals
(Pará) Paysandu	0	1	1
Goiás	2	2	4

== Finals ==
17 May 2023
20:00 BRT (UTC−3)

Paysandu (Pará)	0–2	Goiás
	Report	Maguinho 55'; Philippe 87'

Mangueirão, Belém
Attendance: 13,607
Referee: Alisson Sidnei Furtado

31 May 2023
20:00 BRT (UTC−3)

Goiás	2–1	(Pará) Paysandu
Vinícius 6' (pen.); Matheus Peixoto 38' (pen.)	Report	Bruno Melo 54' (o.g.)

Estádio da Serrinha, Goiânia
Attendance: 11,499
Referee: Dyorgines José Padovani de Andrade

Goiás won 4–1 on aggregate.
