= 2025 Associação Ferroviária de Esportes season =

Associação Ferroviária de Esportes
2025 season
- Chairman: Filippo Duarte Bertolucci
- Head coach: Vinícius Bergantin
- Stadium: Fonte Luminosa
- Série B: Pre-season
- Campeonato Paulista Série A2: Quarterfinals
- Average home league attendance: 2,127
Home colours	Away colours
- All statistics correct as of 15 January 2025.

The 2025 season is the 73rd year in Associação Ferroviária de Esportes' history. The team is set to compete in the Campeonato Brasileiro Série B after earning promotion and the Campeonato Paulista Série A2.

== Squad ==
=== First team squad ===
As of 2 March 2025

Note: Flags indicate national team as defined under FIFA eligibility rules; some limited exceptions apply. Players may hold more than one non-FIFA nationality.

No.	Pos.	Nation	Player
—	GK	BRA	Denis Júnior (on loan from Bahia)
—	GK	BRA	Filipe Costa
—	GK	BRA	Gustavo Jundi
—	GK	BRA	Léo Wall
—	DF	BRA	Gustavo Medina
—	DF	BRA	João Paulo
—	DF	BRA	Ronaldo Alves
—	DF	BRA	Bernardo
—	DF	BRA	Edson Lucas
—	DF	BRA	Eric (on loan from Ceará)
—	DF	BRA	Lucas Rodrigues
—	DF	BRA	Weverton
—	DF	BRA	Zé Mário
—	MF	BRA	Alencar

No.	Pos.	Nation	Player
—	MF	BRA	Cássio Gabriel
—	MF	BRA	Ian Luccas
—	MF	BRA	Juninho
—	MF	BRA	Paulinho Santos
—	MF	BRA	Ricardinho
—	MF	BRA	Tárik
—	FW	BRA	Cauã Aguiar
—	FW	BRA	Denilson
—	FW	BRA	Luis Henrique
—	FW	BRA	Quirino
—	FW	BRA	Ronaldo
—	FW	BRA	Thayllon (on loan from Atlético Goianiense)
—	FW	BRA	Vitor Barreto

=== Transfers Out ===
Pos.	Player	Transferred to	Fee	Date	Source
MF	(Brazil) Xavier	(South Korea) Busan IPark	Undisclosed	17 January 2025	

== Exhibition matches ==
7 January 2025	Ferroviária	1–0	Botafogo-SP

== Competitions ==
=== Overall record ===
Competition	First match	Last match	Starting round	Record							
Competition	First match	Last match	Starting round	Pld	W	D	L	GF	GA	GD	Win %
Série B	5 April 2025	22 November 2025	Matchday 1	32	8	13	11	36	42	−6	25.00
Campeonato Paulista Série A2	15 January 2025	19 march 2025	5th	17	7	4	6	26	22	+4	41.18
Total				49	15	17	17	62	64	−2	30.61

Last updated: 19 January 2025
Source: Competitions

=== Série B ===
==== League table ====
Pos	Team	Pld	W	D	L	GF	GA	GD	Pts	Promotion or relegation
15	Athletic	38	12	8	18	43	53	−10	44	
16	Botafogo-SP	38	10	12	16	32	52	−20	42	
17	Ferroviária (R)	38	8	16	14	43	52	−9	40	Relegation to 2026 Campeonato Brasileiro Série C
18	Amazonas (R)	38	8	12	18	38	55	−17	36	Relegation to 2026 Campeonato Brasileiro Série C
19	Volta Redonda (R)	38	8	12	18	26	43	−17	36	Relegation to 2026 Campeonato Brasileiro Série C

Source: CBF
Rules for classification: 1) points; 2) wins; 3) goal difference; 4) goals scored; 5) head-to-head results (only between 2 teams); 6) fewest red cards; 7) fewest yellow cards; 8) drawing of lots.
(R) Relegated

==== Matches ====
6 April 2025 1	Ferroviária	1–1	Remo	Araraquara
19:00 UTC−3	Carlão 90+4'	Report	Felipe Vizeu 38'	Stadium: Fonte Luminosa; Attendance: 1,526; Referee: Lucas Casagrande

12 April 2025 2	Amazonas	0–0	Ferroviária	Manaus
19:00		Report		Stadium: Arena da Amazônia

11 May 2025 7	Novorizontino	v	Ferroviária	Novo Horizonte
18:30 UTC−3				Stadium: Estádio Doutor Jorge Ismael de Biasi

26 July 2025 19	Ferroviária	0–0	Operário Ferroviário

1 August 2025 20	Remo	0–2	Ferroviária

8 August 2025 21	Ferroviária	2–1	Amazonas

17 August 2025 22	Atlético Goianiense	1–3	Ferroviária

=== Campeonato Paulista Série A2 ===
==== Results by round ====
Round	1	2	3
Ground	A	H	H
Result	W	L	
Position			

Updated to match(es) played on 19 January 2025. Source:
A = Away; H = Home; W = Win; D = Draw; L = Loss

15 January 2025 1	Votuporanguense	0–2	Ferroviária
19:30 UTC−3

19 January 2025 2	Ferroviária	0–1	Oeste
17:00 UTC−3			85' (o.g.)

22 January 2025 3	Ferroviária	v	Ituano
19:00 UTC−3
