= 2025 Campeonato Brasileiro Série B =

Football competition held in Brazil

Campeonato Brasileiro Série B
- Season: 2025
- Dates: 4 April – 23 November
- Champions: Coritiba (3rd title)
- Promoted: Athletico Paranaense; Chapecoense; Coritiba; Remo
- Relegated: Amazonas; Ferroviária; Paysandu; Volta Redonda
- Matches: 380
- Goals: 843 (2.22 per match)
- Top goalscorer: Pedro Rocha (15 goals)
- Biggest home win: Avaí 5–0 Botafogo-SP; R19, 28 July
- Biggest away win: Athletic 0–4 Chapecoense; R23, 22 August
- Highest scoring: 7 goals Coritiba 2–5 Paysandu; R17, 19 July
- Longest winning run: 7 games Athletico Paranaense
- Longest unbeaten run: 10 games Chapecoense
- Longest winless run: 11 games Paysandu
- Longest losing run: 5 games Paysandu; Vila Nova

The 2025 Campeonato Brasileiro Série B (officially the Brasileirão Série B Superbet 2025 for sponsorship reasons) was a football competition held in Brazil, equivalent to the second division. The competition began on 4 April and ended on 23 November.

Twenty teams competed in the tournament, twelve returning from the 2024 season, four promoted from the 2024 Campeonato Brasileiro Série C (Athletic, Ferroviária, Remo and Volta Redonda), and four relegated from the 2024 Campeonato Brasileiro Série A (Athletico Paranaense, Atlético Goianiense, Criciúma and Cuiabá).

The top four teams, Coritiba, Athletico Paranaense, Chapecoense and Remo were promoted to the 2026 Campeonato Brasileiro Série A, with Athletico Paranaense returning after being relegated the previous year, while Coritiba, Chapecoense and Remo returned to the Série A after 2, 5 and 31 years respectively.

== Teams ==
Twenty teams competed in the league – twelve teams from the previous season, as well as four teams promoted from the Série C, and four teams relegated from the Série A.

Location of teams in 2025 Série B

| Pos. | Relegated from 2024 Série A |
|---|---|
| 17th | Athletico Paranaense |
| 18th | Criciúma |
| 19th | Atlético Goianiense |
| 20th | Cuiabá |

| Pos. | Promoted from 2024 Série C |
|---|---|
| 1st | Volta Redonda |
| 2nd | Athletic |
| 3rd | Ferroviária |
| 4th | Remo |

=== Number of teams by state ===
| Number of teams | State | Team(s) |
|---|---|---|
| 3 | Goiás | Atlético Goianiense, Goiás and Vila Nova |
| 3 | Paraná | Athletico Paranaense, Coritiba and Operário Ferroviário |
| 3 | Santa Catarina | Avaí, Chapecoense and Criciúma |
| 3 | São Paulo | Botafogo-SP, Ferroviária and Novorizontino |
| 2 | Minas Gerais | América Mineiro and Athletic |
| 2 | Pará | Paysandu and Remo |
| 1 | Alagoas | CRB |
| 1 | Amazonas | Amazonas |
| 1 | Mato Grosso | Cuiabá |
| 1 | Rio de Janeiro | Volta Redonda |

=== Stadiums and locations ===
| Team | Home city | State | Stadium | Capacity |
|---|---|---|---|---|
| Amazonas | Manaus | Amazonas | Municipal Carlos Zamith | 5,000 |
| Amazonas | Manaus | Amazonas | Arena da Amazônia | 44,000 |
| América Mineiro | Belo Horizonte | Minas Gerais | Arena Independência | 23,018 |
| Athletic | São João del-Rei | Minas Gerais | Arena Sicredi | 6,000 |
| Athletico Paranaense | Curitiba | Paraná | Ligga Arena | 42,372 |
| Atlético Goianiense | Goiânia | Goiás | Antônio Accioly | 12,500 |
| Avaí | Florianópolis | Santa Catarina | Ressacada | 17,826 |
| Botafogo-SP | Ribeirão Preto | São Paulo | Santa Cruz | 29,292 |
| Chapecoense | Chapecó | Santa Catarina | Arena Condá | 20,089 |
| Coritiba | Curitiba | Paraná | Couto Pereira | 40,502 |
| CRB | Maceió | Alagoas | Rei Pelé | 17,126 |
| Criciúma | Criciúma | Santa Catarina | Heriberto Hülse | 19,225 |
| Cuiabá | Cuiabá | Mato Grosso | Arena Pantanal | 44,000 |
| Ferroviária | Araraquara | São Paulo | Fonte Luminosa | 20,000 |
| Goiás | Goiânia | Goiás | Estádio da Serrinha | 14,450 |
| Novorizontino | Novo Horizonte | São Paulo | Doutor Jorge Ismael de Biasi | 16,000 |
| Operário Ferroviário | Ponta Grossa | Paraná | Germano Krüger | 10,632 |
| Paysandu | Belém | Pará | Curuzu | 16,200 |
| Paysandu | Belém | Pará | Mangueirão | 53,635 |
| Remo | Belém | Pará | Baenão | 13,792 |
| Vila Nova | Goiânia | Goiás | Onésio Brasileiro Alvarenga | 6,500 |
| Volta Redonda | Volta Redonda | Rio de Janeiro | Raulino de Oliveira | 20,255 |

== Personnel and kits ==
| Team | Head coach | Captain | Kit manufacturer | Kit main sponsor | Other sponsors |
|---|---|---|---|---|---|
| Amazonas | (Brazil) Aderbal Lana | (Brazil) Fabiano | Onça (Note: Club manufactured kit) | None | List: Front: Banco Sicredi, Atem Distribuidora, Amazonas Shopping; Back: Super Terminais, Trigolar; Sleeves: Super Nova Era, Ulbra; Shorts: Ricosa; Socks: None; Number: ACiti |
| América Mineiro | (Brazil) Alberto Valentim | (Brazil) Ricardo Silva | Volt Sport | MC Games Bet | List: Front: Oficial Sport, Hospital na Residência; Back: Direcional; Sleeves: Supermercados BH; Shorts: UniCesumar; Socks: None; Number: None |
| Athletic | (Portugal) Rui Duarte | (Brazil) Sidimar | Kick Ball | Esquadrão 1909 | List: Front: Conect@, MM Aluguel de Carros; Back: Banco Sicredi, Visite São João del Rei; Sleeves: Esquinão Supermercado; Shorts: UniCesumar; Socks: None; Number: None |
| Athletico Paranaense | (Brazil) Odair Hellmann | (Brazil) Santos | Umbro | Viva Sorte Bet | List: Front: Copacol; Back: Banco Inter; Sleeves: None; Shorts: None; Socks: None; Number: None |
| Atlético Goianiense | (Brazil) Rafael Lacerda | (Brazil) Guilherme Romão | Dragão Premium | Blaze | List: Front: None; Back: Unimed; Sleeves: Cristal Alimentos; Shorts: None; Socks: None; Number: None |
| Avaí | (Brazil) Vinícius Bergantin | (Brazil) Eduardo Brock | Volt Sport | 1pra1.Bet | List: Front: WOA; Back: Genial Investimentos; Sleeves: Liderança; Shorts: UniCesumar, JTA Empreendimentos e Urbanismo; Socks: None; Number: None |
| Botafogo-SP | (Brazil) Ivan Izzo (caretaker) | (Brazil) Ericson | Volt Sport | HanzBet | List: Front: Nicnet; Back: Lukma, Poloar Ar Condicionado; Sleeves: Sermed Saúde; Shorts: Tintas MC; Socks: None; Number: None |
| Chapecoense | (Brazil) Gilmar Dal Pozzo | (Brazil) Bruno Leonardo | Kappa | Aurora | List: Front: Sicoob, ZeroUm; Back: Grupo Bugio, Unimed; Sleeves: ZeroUm; Shorts: Dalla Cervejaria, Agropecuárias Alfa; Socks: None; Number: None |
| Coritiba | (Brazil) Mozart | (Colombia) Sebastián Gómez | Diadora | Reals | List: Front: None; Back: Neodent; Sleeves: Vale Bonus; Shorts: UniCesumar; Socks: None; Number: None |
| CRB | (Brazil) Eduardo Barroca | (Brazil) Fábio Alemão | Regatas | BETesporte | List: Front: None; Back: Coringa, Governo de Alagoas, Prefeitura de Maceió, Fatal Model; Sleeves: None; Shorts: Telesil; Socks: None; Number: None |
| Criciúma | (Brazil) Eduardo Baptista | (Brazil) Rodrigo | Volt Sport | Estrela Bet | List: Front: Sicredi; Back: Cristalcopo, Brametal; Sleeves: UNESC; Shorts: Estrela Bet; Socks: None; Number: None |
| Cuiabá | (Brazil) Eduardo Barros | (Brazil) Carlos Alberto | Kappa | Dourado | List: Front: Sicredi, Agro Amazônia; Back: Sicredi; Sleeves: None; Shorts: None; Socks: None; Number: None |
| Ferroviária | (Brazil) Daniel Azambuja (caretaker) | (Brazil) Ronaldo Alves | Lupo Sport | Esportes da Sorte | List: Front: ADN Construtora, DrogaVen; Back: Pacaembu Construtora; Sleeves: Unimed; Shorts: UniCesumar; Socks: None; Number: None |
| Goiás | (Brazil) Fábio Carille | (Brazil) Tadeu | Diadora | Viva Sorte Bet | List: Front: 5G Energia; Back: Unimed; Sleeves: Cristal Alimentos; Shorts: None; Socks: None; Number: None |
| Novorizontino | (Brazil) Enderson Moreira | (Brazil) Rodrigo Soares | Physicus | PAGOL.Bet | List: Front: Açúcar Santa Isabel; Back: Cresol, Physicus, DS Tecnologia Automotiva; Sleeves: Kodillar Alimentos; Shorts: Guaraná Poty; Socks: None; Number: Oquei Telecom |
| Operário Ferroviário | (Brazil) Alex | (Brazil) Gabriel Boschilia | Karilu | Philips Áudio e Vídeo | List: Front: Feijão Pontarollo, DAF, Plano de Saúde São Camilo, Joelini, Lojas MM, Guararapes, GMAD, Lojão do Keima, Makita, Proadec; Back: Sicredi, Plant Agro, Ecoflex, FGVTN Brasil; Sleeves: Rendmelt, Aiwa, Supermercado Vitor, Plano de Saúde São Camilo, Joka; Shorts: Lojão do Keima, Proadec; Socks: None; Number: Karilu |
| Paysandu | (Brazil) Ignácio Neto (caretaker) | (Brazil) Matheus Nogueira | Lobo | Banpará | List: Front: GingaBet, Governo do Pará, Arroz Zilmar, Sankhya; Back: Revemar, Alubar, Mirella; Sleeves: None; Shorts: UniCesumar; Socks: None; Number: None |
| Remo | (Brazil) Guto Ferreira | (Brazil) Reynaldo | Volt Sport | ObaBet | List: Front: Governo do Pará, Banpará, GAV Resorts, Arroz Zilmar; Back: Banpará, Revemar, Inviolável, Mirella; Sleeves: ObaBet; Shorts: Remo TV; Socks: None; Number: None |
| Vila Nova | (Brazil) Umberto Louzer | (Brazil) João Vieira | Volt Sport | GingaBet | List: Front: Eternit Brasil, GAV Resorts, Tintas Luztol; Back: BCJ, Oficial Sport, Unimed; Sleeves: Arroz Cristal; Shorts: UniCesumar, Grupo F8, Fórmula Distribuidora; Socks: None; Number: None |
| Volta Redonda | (Brazil) Neto Colucci (caretaker) | (Brazil) Bruno Barra | Pratic Sport | BETesporte | List: Front: Pix do Milhão, Cinbal Incoflandres, Sicoob; Back: Pompeu Pneus, Pratic Sport; Sleeves: Havan; Shorts: Pompeu Pneus, UniCesumar; Socks: Transportes Excelsior; Number: None |

=== Coaching changes ===
| Team | Outgoing head coach | Manner of departure | Date of vacancy | Position in table | Incoming head coach | Date of appointment | Ref |
|---|---|---|---|---|---|---|---|
| Coritiba | (Brazil) Guilherme Bossle | End of caretaker spell | 22 November 2024 | Pre-season | (Brazil) Mozart | 26 November 2024 | |
| Amazonas | (Brazil) Ibson | End of caretaker spell | 22 November 2024 | Pre-season | (Brazil) Aderbal Lana | 7 January 2025 | |
| Vila Nova | (Brazil) Thiago Carvalho | Contract ended | 24 November 2024 | Pre-season | (Brazil) Rafael Lacerda | 26 November 2024 | |
| Goiás | (Brazil) Vagner Mancini | Contract ended | 24 November 2024 | Pre-season | (Brazil) Jair Ventura | 23 November 2024 | |
| Operário Ferroviário | (Brazil) Rafael Guanaes | Contract ended | 24 November 2024 | Pre-season | (Brazil) Bruno Pivetti | 25 November 2024 | |
| América Mineiro | (Brazil) Diogo Giacomini | End of caretaker spell | 24 November 2024 | Pre-season | (Brazil) William Batista | 6 December 2024 | |
| CRB | (Brazil) Hélio dos Anjos | Sacked | 29 November 2024 | Pre-season | (Brazil) Umberto Louzer | 30 November 2024 | |
| Atlético Goianiense | (Brazil) Anderson Gomes | End of caretaker spell | 8 December 2024 | Pre-season | (Brazil) Rafael Guanaes | 2 December 2024 | |
| Criciúma | (Brazil) Cláudio Tencati | End of contract | 8 December 2024 | Pre-season | (Brazil) Zé Ricardo | 18 December 2024 | |
| Athletico Paranaense | (Argentina) Lucho González | Sacked | 10 December 2024 | Pre-season | (Brazil) Maurício Barbieri | 16 December 2024 | |
| Paysandu | (Brazil) Márcio Fernandes | Sacked | 9 February 2025 | State leagues | (Brazil) Luizinho Lopes | 10 February 2025 | |
| Ferroviária | (Brazil) Júnior Rocha | Sacked | 16 February 2025 | State leagues | (Brazil) Vinícius Bergantin | 17 February 2025 | |
| Cuiabá | (Brazil) Bernardo Franco | Sacked | 20 February 2025 | State leagues | (Brazil) Guto Ferreira | 21 February 2025 | |
| Amazonas | (Brazil) Aderbal Lana | Moved to coordinator role | 23 February 2025 | State leagues | (Brazil) Eduardo Barros | 23 February 2025 | |
| Atlético Goianiense | (Brazil) Rafael Guanaes | Sacked | 2 March 2025 | State leagues | (Brazil) Anderson Gomes (caretaker) | 2 March 2025 | |
| Remo | (Brazil) Rodrigo Santana | Sacked | 13 March 2025 | State leagues | (Brazil) Daniel Paulista | 13 March 2025 | |
| Atlético Goianiense | (Brazil) Anderson Gomes | End of caretaker spell | 13 March 2025 | State leagues | (Brazil) Cláudio Tencati | 13 March 2025 | |
| Goiás | (Brazil) Jair Ventura | Sacked | 25 March 2025 | State leagues | (Brazil) Vagner Mancini | 26 March 2025 | |
| Avaí | (Brazil) Enderson Moreira | Mutual agreement | 25 March 2025 | State leagues | (Brazil) Jair Ventura | 28 March 2025 | |
| CRB | (Brazil) Umberto Louzer | Mutual agreement | 27 March 2025 | State leagues | (Brazil) Eduardo Barroca | 27 March 2025 | |
| Novorizontino | (Brazil) Eduardo Baptista | Sacked | 3 April 2025 | State leagues | (Brazil) Umberto Louzer (Note: Ben-Hur was the interim head coach in the 1st round against Avaí) | 4 April 2025 | |
| Amazonas | (Brazil) Eduardo Barros | Sacked | 19 April 2025 | 17th | (Brazil) Guilherme Alves (Note: Ibson was the interim head coach in the 4th round against Avaí) | 19 April 2025 | |
| Athletico Paranaense | (Brazil) Maurício Barbieri | Sacked | 4 May 2025 | 9th | (Portugal) João Correia (caretaker) | 4 May 2025 | |
| Criciúma | (Brazil) Zé Ricardo | Sacked | 6 May 2025 | 15th | (Brazil) Eduardo Baptista | 7 May 2025 | |
| Atlético Goianiense | (Brazil) Cláudio Tencati | Signed by Juventude | 13 May 2025 | 12th | (Brazil) Fábio Matias (Note: Anderson Gomes was the interim head coach in the 8th round against Remo) | 16 May 2025 | |
| Botafogo-SP | (Brazil) Márcio Zanardi | Sacked | 18 May 2025 | 8th | (Brazil) Allan Aal | 19 May 2025 | |
| Athletico Paranaense | (Portugal) João Correia | End of caretaker spell | 21 May 2025 | 13th | (Brazil) Odair Hellmann | 21 May 2025 | |
| Athletic | (Brazil) Roger | Resigned | 2 June 2025 | 18th | (Portugal) Rui Duarte | 4 June 2025 | |
| América Mineiro | (Brazil) William Batista | Sacked | 2 June 2025 | 12th | (Brazil) Enderson Moreira | 2 June 2025 | |
| Paysandu | (Brazil) Luizinho Lopes | Sacked | 2 June 2025 | 20th | (Brazil) Claudinei Oliveira (Note: Sandro Forner was the interim head coach in the 11th round against Cuiabá) | 4 June 2025 | |
| Remo | (Brazil) Daniel Paulista | Signed by Sport Recife | 6 June 2025 | 6th | (Brazil) Flávio Garcia (caretaker) | 7 June 2025 | |
| Vila Nova | (Brazil) Rafael Lacerda | Sacked | 11 June 2025 | 9th | (Brazil) Luizinho Lopes | 11 June 2025 | |
| Operário Ferroviário | (Brazil) Bruno Pivetti | Sacked | 15 June 2025 | 12th | (Brazil) Alex | 16 June 2025 | |
| Remo | (Brazil) Flávio Garcia | End of caretaker spell | 16 June 2025 | 6th | (Portugal) António Oliveira | 19 June 2025 | |
| Amazonas | (Brazil) Guilherme Alves | Sacked | 6 July 2025 | 19th | (Brazil) Márcio Zanardi | 8 July 2025 | |
| Atlético Goianiense | (Brazil) Fábio Matias | Sacked | 18 July 2025 | 12th | (Brazil) Rafael Lacerda | 19 July 2025 | |
| Vila Nova | (Brazil) Luizinho Lopes | Sacked | 1 August 2025 | 9th | (Brazil) Paulo Turra | 3 August 2025 | |
| América Mineiro | (Brazil) Enderson Moreira | Sacked | 3 August 2025 | 16th | (Brazil) Diogo Giacomini (caretaker) | 5 August 2025 | |
| Cuiabá | (Brazil) Guto Ferreira | Sacked | 10 August 2025 | 7th | (Brazil) Eduardo Barros | 11 August 2025 | |
| América Mineiro | (Brazil) Diogo Giacomini | End of caretaker spell | 11 August 2025 | 17th | (Brazil) Alberto Valentim | 11 August 2025 | |
| Novorizontino | (Brazil) Umberto Louzer | Sacked | 25 August 2025 | 5th | (Brazil) Enderson Moreira | 26 August 2025 | |
| Paysandu | (Brazil) Claudinei Oliveira | Sacked | 5 September 2025 | 20th | (Brazil) Márcio Fernandes | 9 September 2025 | |
| Ferroviária | (Brazil) Vinícius Bergantin | Sacked | 15 September 2025 | 16th | (Brazil) Claudinei Oliveira (Note: Daniel Azambuja was the interim head coach in the 27th round against Avaí) | 19 September 2025 | |
| Remo | (Portugal) António Oliveira | Sacked | 22 September 2025 | 7th | (Brazil) Guto Ferreira (Note: Flávio Garcia was the interim head coach in the 28th round against Volta Redonda) | 22 September 2025 | |
| Avaí | (Brazil) Jair Ventura | Signed by Esporte Clube Vitória | 23 September 2025 | 11th | (Brazil) Vinícius Bergantin (Note: Marquinhos was the interim head coach in the 28th round against Chapecoense) | 24 September 2025 | |
| Vila Nova | (Brazil) Paulo Turra | Sacked | 24 September 2025 | 12th | (Brazil) Umberto Louzer | 25 September 2025 | |
| Botafogo-SP | (Brazil) Allan Aal | Sacked | 4 October 2025 | 18th | (Brazil) Ivan Izzo (caretaker) (Note: Caretaker head coach until the end of the season) | 6 October 2025 | |
| Goiás | (Brazil) Vagner Mancini | Sacked | 13 October 2025 | 4th | (Brazil) Fábio Carille | 13 October 2025 | |
| Amazonas | (Brazil) Márcio Zanardi | Sacked | 29 October 2025 | 19th | (Brazil) Aderbal Lana | 30 October 2025 | |
| Paysandu | (Brazil) Márcio Fernandes | Sacked | 3 November 2025 | 20th | (Brazil) Ignácio Neto (caretaker) | 3 November 2025 | |
| Ferroviária | (Brazil) Claudinei Oliveira | Sacked | 10 November 2025 | 16th | (Brazil) Daniel Azambuja (caretaker) | 10 November 2025 | |
| Volta Redonda | (Brazil) Rogério Corrêa | Mutual agreement | 12 November 2025 | 19th | (Brazil) Neto Colucci (caretaker) | 12 November 2025 | |

== Foreign players ==
The clubs can have a maximum of nine foreign players in their Campeonato Brasileiro squads per match, but there is no limit of foreigners in the clubs' squads.

- Players marked in **bold** indicate they are registered during mid-season transfer window.
- Players marked in italics indicate they had left the club during mid-season transfer window.

| Club | Player 1 | Player 2 | Player 3 | Player 4 | Player 5 | Player 6 | Player 7 | Player 8 | Player 9 | Player 10 | Player 11 | Player 12 | Player 13 | Former players |
|---|---|---|---|---|---|---|---|---|---|---|---|---|---|---|
| Amazonas | (Argentina) **Iván Alvariño** | (Argentina) **Joaquín Torres** | (Argentina) Nicolás Linares | (Cape Verde) **Vagner Gonçalves** | (Colombia) Larry Vásquez | (Colombia) Nilson Castrillón | (Denmark) **Riza Durmisi** | (Equatorial Guinea) Carlos Akapo | (Paraguay) **Diego Torres** | (Peru) **Aldair Rodríguez** | (Uruguay) Diego Zabala | (Uruguay) Kevin Ramírez | (Uruguay) Santiago Viera | (Colombia) Jonathan Palacios (Ecuador) Jonny Uchuari (France) Yaya Sanogo |
| América Mineiro | (Argentina) **Christian Ortiz** | (Argentina) Fernando Elizari | (Bolivia) Miguel Terceros | (Uruguay) **Facundo Labandeira** | | | | | | | | | | (Argentina) Martín Benítez |
| Athletic | (Cape Verde) **Alessio da Cruz** | (Paraguay) Fernando Martínez | (Portugal) **Francisco Geraldes** | (Portugal) **Ronaldo Tavares** | | | | | | | | | | |
| Athletico Paranaense | (Argentina) Bruno Zapelli | (Argentina) **Gastón Benavídez** | (Argentina) Lucas Esquivel | (Colombia) **Carlos Terán** | (Colombia) **Élan Ricardo** | (Colombia) **Juan Felipe Aguirre** | (Colombia) Kevin Velasco | (Colombia) **Kevin Viveros** | (Colombia) **Stiven Mendoza** | (Portugal) Tobias Figueiredo | (Ukraine) Maksym Voronov | | | (Chile) Luciano Arriagada (Colombia) Hayen Palacios (Paraguay) Fabrizio Peralta |
| Atlético Goianiense | (Syria) **Ezequiel Ham** | (Uruguay) Federico Martínez | (Uruguay) Francisco Barrios | (Uruguay) **Luciano Cosentino** | | | | | | | | | | (Chile) Ángelo Araos (Uruguay) Alejo Cruz |
| Avaí | | | | | | | | | | | | | | (Ecuador) Robert Burbano |
| Botafogo-SP | (Argentina) Alejo Dramisino | (Argentina) Gabriel Risso Patrón | (Argentina) Leandro Maciel | (Ecuador) Ronie Carrillo | | | | | | | | | | (Ecuador) Orlando Herrera (Ghana) Sabit Abdulai |
| Chapecoense | (Paraguay) Jorge Jiménez | (Paraguay) Walter Clar | | | | | | | | | | | | |
| Coritiba | (Chile) Matías Fracchia | (Colombia) Sebastián Gómez | (Portugal) Josué Pesqueira | (Uruguay) Carlos de Pena | | | | | | | | | | |
| CRB | (Ecuador) Luis Segovia | (Uruguay) **Facundo Barceló** | | | | | | | | | | | | |
| Criciúma | (Argentina) **Benjamín Borasi** | (Nigeria) Samuel Otusanya | | | | | | | | | | | | |
| Cuiabá | (Argentina) **Alejandro Martínez** | (Argentina) **Felipe Pasadore** | (Argentina) Yamil Asad | (Chile) **Cristóbal Chadwick** | | | | | | | | | | |
| Ferroviária | (Portugal) **Hernâni Fortes** | | | | | | | | | | | | | |
| Goiás | (Argentina) **Martín Benítez** | (Uruguay) Gonzalo Freitas | (Venezuela) Esli García | | | | | | | | | | | (Uruguay) Facundo Barceló |
| Novorizontino | (Paraguay) Óscar Ruiz | | | | | | | | | | | | | |
| Operário Ferroviário | (Colombia) Jaime Giraldo | (Colombia) Juan Zuluaga | | | | | | | | | | | | |
| Paysandu | (Argentina) Joaquín Novillo | (Ecuador) Joseph Espinoza | (Paraguay) Jorge Benítez | (Paraguay) Pedro Delvalle | (Paraguay) Ramón Martínez | (Uruguay) Yeferson Quintana | | | | | | | | (Argentina) Benjamín Borasi (Chile) Matías Cavalleri |
| Remo | (Colombia) **Víctor Cantillo** | (Paraguay) Alan Rodríguez | (Uruguay) **Diego Hernández** | (Uruguay) **Nicolás Ferreira** | (Uruguay) **Cristian Tassano** | (Guinea-Bissau) **João Pedro** | (Greece) **Panagiotis Tachtsidis** | | | | | | | (Argentina) Iván Alvariño |
| Vila Nova | | | | | | | | | | | | | | (Argentina) Diego Torres (Panama) Eric Davis (Uruguay) Facundo Labandeira |
| Volta Redonda | (Argentina) **Lautaro Belleggia** | | | | | | | | | | | | | (Paraguay) Luis Cáceres |

=== Dual nationality ===
Players who are Brazilian nationals but also hold dual citizenship or represent another FIFA nation in international football are not regarded as foreign players and do not take up a foreign player slot.

- (Portugal) Marcos Paulo (Operário Ferroviário)

== League table ==
| Pos | Team | Pld | W | D | L | GF | GA | GD | Pts | Promotion or relegation |
|---|---|---|---|---|---|---|---|---|---|---|
| 1 | Coritiba (C, P) | 38 | 19 | 11 | 8 | 39 | 23 | +16 | 68 | Promotion to 2026 Campeonato Brasileiro Série A |
| 2 | Athletico Paranaense (P) | 38 | 19 | 8 | 11 | 53 | 43 | +10 | 65 | Promotion to 2026 Campeonato Brasileiro Série A |
| 3 | Chapecoense (P) | 38 | 18 | 8 | 12 | 52 | 35 | +17 | 62 | Promotion to 2026 Campeonato Brasileiro Série A |
| 4 | Remo (P) | 38 | 16 | 14 | 8 | 51 | 39 | +12 | 62 | Promotion to 2026 Campeonato Brasileiro Série A |
| 5 | Criciúma | 38 | 17 | 10 | 11 | 47 | 33 | +14 | 61 | |
| 6 | Goiás | 38 | 17 | 10 | 11 | 42 | 37 | +5 | 61 | |
| 7 | Novorizontino | 38 | 15 | 15 | 8 | 43 | 32 | +11 | 60 | |
| 8 | CRB | 38 | 16 | 8 | 14 | 45 | 40 | +5 | 56 | |
| 9 | Avaí | 38 | 14 | 14 | 10 | 50 | 40 | +10 | 56 | |
| 10 | Cuiabá | 38 | 14 | 12 | 12 | 43 | 44 | −1 | 54 | |
| 11 | Atlético Goianiense | 38 | 13 | 13 | 12 | 39 | 38 | +1 | 52 | |
| 12 | Operário Ferroviário | 38 | 12 | 12 | 14 | 40 | 44 | −4 | 48 | |
| 13 | Vila Nova | 38 | 11 | 14 | 13 | 40 | 44 | −4 | 47 | |
| 14 | América Mineiro | 38 | 12 | 10 | 16 | 41 | 44 | −3 | 46 | |
| 15 | Athletic | 38 | 12 | 8 | 18 | 43 | 53 | −10 | 44 | |
| 16 | Botafogo-SP | 38 | 10 | 12 | 16 | 32 | 52 | −20 | 42 | |
| 17 | Ferroviária (R) | 38 | 8 | 16 | 14 | 43 | 52 | −9 | 40 | Relegation to 2026 Campeonato Brasileiro Série C |
| 18 | Amazonas (R) | 38 | 8 | 12 | 18 | 38 | 55 | −17 | 36 | Relegation to 2026 Campeonato Brasileiro Série C |
| 19 | Volta Redonda (R) | 38 | 8 | 12 | 18 | 26 | 43 | −17 | 36 | Relegation to 2026 Campeonato Brasileiro Série C |
| 20 | Paysandu (R) | 38 | 5 | 13 | 20 | 36 | 52 | −16 | 28 | Relegation to 2026 Campeonato Brasileiro Série C |

Source: CBF
Rules for classification: 1) points; 2) wins; 3) goal difference; 4) goals scored; 5) head-to-head results (only between 2 teams); 6) fewest red cards; 7) fewest yellow cards; 8) drawing of lots.
(C) Champions; (P) Promoted; (R) Relegated

== Positions by round ==
The table lists the positions of teams after each week of matches. In order to preserve chronological evolvements, any postponed matches were not included to the round at which they were originally scheduled, but added to the full round they were played immediately afterwards.

| Team ╲ Round | 1 | 2 | 3 | 4 | 5 | 6 | 7 | 8 | 9 | 10 | 11 | 12 | 13 | 14 | 15 | 16 | 17 | 18 | 19 | 20 | 21 | 22 | 23 | 24 | 25 | 26 | 27 | 28 | 29 | 30 | 31 | 32 | 33 | 34 | 35 | 36 | 37 | 38 |
|---|---|---|---|---|---|---|---|---|---|---|---|---|---|---|---|---|---|---|---|---|---|---|---|---|---|---|---|---|---|---|---|---|---|---|---|---|---|---|
| Amazonas | 18 | 15 | 17 | 19 | 19 | 20 | 20 | 20 | 17 | 18 | 18 | 18 | 17 | 18 | 20 | 20 | 20 | 18 | 19 | 20 | 20 | 20 | 17 | 18 | 19 | 19 | 18 | 19 | 19 | 19 | 18 | 19 | 19 | 19 | 18 | 18 | 18 | 18 |
| América Mineiro | 4 | 11 | 6 | 2 | 8 | 10 | 11 | 14 | 12 | 12 | 14 | 10 | 13 | 8 | 12 | 12 | 14 | 15 | 15 | 16 | 17 | 16 | 19 | 17 | 17 | 17 | 16 | 16 | 15 | 14 | 14 | 14 | 14 | 14 | 14 | 13 | 12 | 14 |
| Athletic | 20 | 20 | 20 | 20 | 16 | 18 | 15 | 15 | 18 | 19 | 19 | 19 | 18 | 20 | 17 | 14 | 13 | 11 | 12 | 13 | 15 | 15 | 15 | 15 | 15 | 14 | 14 | 15 | 16 | 16 | 15 | 15 | 16 | 16 | 17 | 16 | 15 | 15 |
| Athletico Paranaense | 2 | 1 | 5 | 1 | 7 | 9 | 9 | 13 | 11 | 11 | 12 | 9 | 6 | 9 | 6 | 8 | 9 | 10 | 11 | 11 | 13 | 13 | 12 | 11 | 8 | 6 | 5 | 5 | 4 | 4 | 6 | 7 | 7 | 7 | 4 | 2 | 2 | 2 |
| Atlético Goianiense | 1 | 5 | 11 | 13 | 13 | 12 | 13 | 12 | 13 | 14 | 13 | 14 | 10 | 12 | 11 | 10 | 12 | 14 | 14 | 14 | 11 | 14 | 14 | 14 | 13 | 13 | 9 | 8 | 9 | 8 | 10 | 10 | 10 | 11 | 10 | 10 | 10 | 11 |
| Avaí | 12 | 12 | 9 | 5 | 1 | 5 | 4 | 8 | 5 | 9 | 6 | 6 | 7 | 4 | 4 | 6 | 7 | 9 | 8 | 8 | 7 | 8 | 9 | 12 | 9 | 11 | 11 | 10 | 11 | 11 | 11 | 11 | 11 | 10 | 9 | 9 | 9 | 9 |
| Botafogo-SP | 17 | 14 | 16 | 16 | 17 | 16 | 18 | 18 | 15 | 17 | 17 | 17 | 16 | 16 | 16 | 17 | 19 | 20 | 20 | 18 | 18 | 18 | 16 | 16 | 16 | 16 | 17 | 18 | 18 | 18 | 17 | 18 | 18 | 17 | 16 | 15 | 16 | 16 |
| Chapecoense | 16 | 17 | 14 | 10 | 11 | 8 | 7 | 6 | 9 | 7 | 8 | 8 | 9 | 10 | 7 | 7 | 4 | 4 | 4 | 4 | 4 | 3 | 3 | 3 | 4 | 4 | 6 | 7 | 7 | 5 | 3 | 5 | 2 | 2 | 2 | 4 | 5 | 3 |
| Coritiba | 7 | 3 | 4 | 9 | 4 | 7 | 8 | 7 | 3 | 2 | 4 | 4 | 3 | 2 | 1 | 1 | 2 | 2 | 2 | 2 | 2 | 1 | 2 | 2 | 1 | 1 | 2 | 3 | 1 | 1 | 1 | 1 | 1 | 1 | 1 | 1 | 1 | 1 |
| CRB | 5 | 2 | 1 | 3 | 6 | 6 | 6 | 4 | 8 | 5 | 7 | 3 | 4 | 6 | 10 | 11 | 11 | 13 | 10 | 12 | 10 | 10 | 10 | 7 | 11 | 9 | 10 | 9 | 10 | 10 | 8 | 9 | 9 | 8 | 8 | 8 | 8 | 8 |
| Criciúma | 14 | 16 | 13 | 14 | 14 | 15 | 16 | 16 | 19 | 16 | 15 | 12 | 15 | 15 | 15 | 13 | 10 | 8 | 6 | 7 | 6 | 7 | 4 | 4 | 3 | 3 | 3 | 1 | 3 | 3 | 4 | 2 | 3 | 6 | 6 | 5 | 3 | 5 |
| Cuiabá | 6 | 7 | 2 | 6 | 2 | 4 | 5 | 10 | 7 | 4 | 3 | 5 | 5 | 7 | 9 | 4 | 6 | 6 | 7 | 5 | 8 | 9 | 8 | 9 | 6 | 8 | 7 | 6 | 6 | 7 | 9 | 8 | 8 | 9 | 11 | 11 | 11 | 10 |
| Ferroviária | 10 | 13 | 8 | 11 | 12 | 11 | 12 | 11 | 14 | 13 | 10 | 13 | 11 | 13 | 13 | 16 | 17 | 17 | 18 | 15 | 14 | 11 | 13 | 13 | 14 | 15 | 15 | 14 | 14 | 15 | 16 | 16 | 15 | 15 | 15 | 17 | 17 | 17 |
| Goiás | 8 | 4 | 3 | 8 | 5 | 2 | 1 | 1 | 1 | 1 | 1 | 1 | 1 | 1 | 2 | 2 | 1 | 1 | 1 | 1 | 1 | 2 | 1 | 1 | 2 | 2 | 1 | 2 | 2 | 2 | 2 | 4 | 6 | 4 | 7 | 6 | 4 | 6 |
| Novorizontino | 11 | 8 | 10 | 12 | 10 | 13 | 14 | 9 | 6 | 3 | 2 | 2 | 2 | 3 | 3 | 3 | 3 | 3 | 3 | 3 | 3 | 4 | 5 | 5 | 7 | 5 | 4 | 4 | 5 | 6 | 5 | 3 | 5 | 5 | 5 | 7 | 7 | 7 |
| Operário Ferroviário | 3 | 9 | 15 | 15 | 15 | 14 | 10 | 5 | 10 | 10 | 11 | 15 | 12 | 14 | 14 | 15 | 15 | 12 | 13 | 10 | 12 | 12 | 11 | 10 | 12 | 12 | 13 | 11 | 12 | 12 | 13 | 13 | 13 | 13 | 13 | 14 | 14 | 12 |
| Paysandu | 13 | 18 | 19 | 18 | 18 | 19 | 19 | 19 | 20 | 20 | 20 | 20 | 20 | 19 | 18 | 18 | 16 | 16 | 17 | 19 | 19 | 19 | 20 | 20 | 20 | 20 | 20 | 20 | 20 | 20 | 20 | 20 | 20 | 20 | 20 | 20 | 20 | 20 |
| Remo | 9 | 6 | 7 | 4 | 9 | 3 | 2 | 3 | 2 | 6 | 5 | 7 | 8 | 5 | 5 | 5 | 5 | 5 | 5 | 6 | 5 | 5 | 6 | 6 | 5 | 7 | 8 | 12 | 8 | 9 | 7 | 6 | 4 | 3 | 3 | 3 | 6 | 4 |
| Vila Nova | 19 | 10 | 12 | 7 | 3 | 1 | 3 | 2 | 4 | 8 | 9 | 11 | 14 | 11 | 8 | 9 | 8 | 7 | 9 | 9 | 9 | 6 | 7 | 8 | 10 | 10 | 12 | 13 | 13 | 13 | 12 | 12 | 12 | 12 | 12 | 12 | 13 | 13 |
| Volta Redonda | 15 | 19 | 18 | 17 | 20 | 17 | 17 | 17 | 16 | 15 | 16 | 16 | 19 | 17 | 19 | 19 | 18 | 19 | 16 | 17 | 16 | 17 | 18 | 19 | 18 | 18 | 19 | 17 | 17 | 17 | 19 | 17 | 17 | 18 | 19 | 19 | 19 | 19 |

| Champions, promoted to Campeonato Brasileiro Série A |
| Promotion to Campeonato Brasileiro Série A |
| Relegation to Campeonato Brasileiro Série C |

Source: CBF

== Results ==
| Home \ Away | AMA | AME | ATH | CAP | ACG | AVA | BSP | CHA | COR | CRB | CRI | CUI | AFE | GOI | NOV | OPE | PAY | REM | VIL | VOL |
|---|---|---|---|---|---|---|---|---|---|---|---|---|---|---|---|---|---|---|---|---|
| Amazonas | | 2–2 | 1–0 | 0–1 | 1–1 | 0–2 | 3–0 | 1–3 | 1–2 | 1–1 | 2–1 | 2–0 | 0–0 | 2–2 | 0–0 | 2–0 | 1–1 | 1–3 | 2–1 | 1–0 |
| América Mineiro | 3–1 | | 0–1 | 2–2 | 2–1 | 2–0 | 1–0 | 0–1 | 1–0 | 1–1 | 1–1 | 1–1 | 1–2 | 1–0 | 2–2 | 1–1 | 2–2 | 0–1 | 1–1 | 2–1 |
| Athletic | 2–2 | 0–2 | | 0–3 | 1–1 | 4–0 | 2–0 | 0–4 | 1–1 | 1–2 | 1–1 | 0–2 | 2–1 | 1–1 | 0–2 | 2–1 | 2–1 | 1–2 | 0–1 | 2–1 |
| Athletico Paranaense | 2–0 | 1–0 | 1–0 | | 0–1 | 1–1 | 1–4 | 1–1 | 0–1 | 2–0 | 2–1 | 1–1 | 1–1 | 0–1 | 2–1 | 1–0 | 1–1 | 2–1 | 2–0 | 2–0 |
| Atlético Goianiense | 2–0 | 1–0 | 4–2 | 3–0 | | 2–1 | 2–0 | 0–0 | 0–0 | 2–1 | 0–1 | 1–1 | 1–3 | 1–2 | 1–0 | 0–0 | 2–1 | 1–1 | 1–0 | 2–0 |
| Avaí | 1–2 | 3–0 | 2–1 | 1–2 | 0–0 | | 5–0 | 2–1 | 0–2 | 1–0 | 1–1 | 2–0 | 2–2 | 2–1 | 1–1 | 1–0 | 0–0 | 3–1 | 1–1 | 3–0 |
| Botafogo-SP | 1–0 | 2–1 | 0–3 | 1–3 | 1–1 | 0–0 | | 1–0 | 0–0 | 2–1 | 0–2 | 2–2 | 1–2 | 0–1 | 0–0 | 1–1 | 1–0 | 2–2 | 2–0 | 0–0 |
| Chapecoense | 4–0 | 0–1 | 1–0 | 2–3 | 1–0 | 0–1 | 1–1 | | 1–2 | 3–2 | 2–1 | 2–1 | 2–1 | 1–2 | 1–0 | 2–0 | 2–0 | 1–1 | 2–2 | 4–2 |
| Coritiba | 1–1 | 1–0 | 0–0 | 0–0 | 2–1 | 2–1 | 2–0 | 0–0 | | 0–0 | 0–2 | 2–0 | 4–0 | 0–0 | 0–0 | 2–0 | 2–5 | 0–0 | 1–0 | 2–0 |
| CRB | 2–0 | 1–2 | 1–0 | 0–1 | 2–1 | 1–0 | 3–2 | 1–0 | 0–1 | | 1–0 | 1–1 | 2–2 | 2–0 | 4–0 | 2–2 | 2–0 | 2–0 | 2–0 | 1–0 |
| Criciúma | 3–2 | 2–1 | 4–0 | 4–2 | 1–0 | 1–2 | 2–0 | 2–0 | 0–1 | 1–0 | | 1–0 | 2–1 | 1–2 | 2–0 | 1–2 | 2–4 | 1–1 | 1–0 | 0–0 |
| Cuiabá | 3–1 | 3–1 | 2–1 | 2–1 | 2–2 | 2–2 | 0–1 | 1–0 | 1–0 | 1–0 | 1–0 | | 1–0 | 0–1 | 0–1 | 2–3 | 1–0 | 1–3 | 1–0 | 2–0 |
| Ferroviária | 2–1 | 1–3 | 1–2 | 1–2 | 2–0 | 1–1 | 1–1 | 0–1 | 2–1 | 1–0 | 0–0 | 2–2 | | 1–1 | 1–2 | 0–0 | 2–2 | 1–1 | 1–3 | 0–0 |
| Goiás | 1–0 | 1–0 | 1–2 | 0–1 | 0–0 | 2–1 | 2–3 | 1–3 | 1–0 | 1–2 | 1–1 | 3–1 | 2–0 | | 1–0 | 2–1 | 1–0 | 1–1 | 2–2 | 2–0 |
| Novorizontino | 1–1 | 3–1 | 1–0 | 2–1 | 1–1 | 1–1 | 1–1 | 1–0 | 1–2 | 3–0 | 1–1 | 3–0 | 2–2 | 1–0 | | 3–0 | 3–1 | 1–1 | 1–1 | 1–0 |
| Operário Ferroviário | 2–1 | 1–0 | 1–4 | 2–2 | 3–0 | 0–0 | 3–0 | 1–2 | 1–0 | 1–1 | 1–0 | 1–1 | 2–1 | 1–2 | 2–0 | | 0–0 | 0–1 | 2–2 | 2–1 |
| Paysandu | 2–2 | 0–0 | 1–1 | 1–2 | 2–2 | 1–2 | 1–0 | 0–2 | 1–2 | 1–1 | 0–1 | 1–1 | 2–1 | 0–0 | 0–1 | 1–2 | | 2–3 | 0–1 | 1–2 |
| Remo | 1–0 | 2–0 | 3–1 | 2–1 | 0–1 | 2–1 | 1–1 | 1–1 | 1–0 | 4–2 | 0–1 | 0–0 | 0–2 | 3–1 | 1–1 | 2–1 | 0–1 | | 2–0 | 1–1 |
| Vila Nova | 1–0 | 0–3 | 1–1 | 2–1 | 1–0 | 2–2 | 2–0 | 1–0 | 1–2 | 2–0 | 1–1 | 2–2 | 2–2 | 2–0 | 0–1 | 0–0 | 1–0 | 1–1 | | 2–2 |
| Volta Redonda | 1–1 | 1–0 | 0–2 | 3–2 | 3–0 | 1–1 | 0–1 | 1–1 | 0–1 | 0–1 | 0–0 | 0–1 | 0–0 | 0–0 | 0–0 | 1–0 | 1–0 | 2–1 | 2–1 | |

Source: CBF
Legend: Blue = home team win; Yellow = draw; Red = away team win.

== Top goalscorers ==
| Rank | Player | Club | Goals |
|---|---|---|---|
| 1 | (Brazil) Pedro Rocha | Remo | 15 |
| 2 | (Brazil) Carlão | Ferroviária | 13 |
| 2 | (Brazil) Cléber | Avaí | 13 |
| 4 | (Brazil) Willian Bigode | América Mineiro | 11 |
| 5 | (Brazil) Alisson Safira | Cuiabá | 10 |
| 5 | (Brazil) Anselmo Ramon | Goiás | 10 |
| 5 | (Uruguay) Kevin Ramírez | Amazonas | 10 |

Source:CBF
