= João Paulo (footballer, born 1997) =

Brazilian footballer

Personal information
- Full name: João Paulo Silveira dos Santos
- Date of birth: 4 July 1997 (age 29)
- Place of birth: Santana do Livramento, Brazil
- Height: 1.87 m (6 ft 2 in)
- Position: Centre-back

Team information
- Current team: Chapecoense (on loan from Ferroviária)
- Number: 4

Youth career
- Aimoré
- 2017: Ponte Preta

Senior career*
Years	Team	Apps	(Gls)
2018	Grêmio Anápolis	1	(0)
2018–2019	Boavista B	26	(3)
2019	Paulista	16	(7)
2020–2022	Fortaleza	4	(0)
2020	→ São José-RS (loan)	0	(0)
2022	→ Náutico (loan)	22	(0)
2023	→ Inter de Limeira (loan)	8	(1)
2023–	Ferroviária	17	(0)
2024	→ Chapecoense (loan)	21	(1)
2025–	→ Chapecoense (loan)	37	(1)
- * Club domestic league appearances and goals as of 9 April 2026

João Paulo Silveira dos Santos (born 4 July 1997), known as João Paulo, is a Brazilian footballer who plays as a centre-back for Chapecoense, on loan from Ferroviária.

== Career ==
Born in Santana do Livramento, Rio Grande do Sul, João Paulo played for Aimoré and Ponte Preta as a youth before making his senior debut with Grêmio Anápolis in 2018. He moved abroad shortly after, joining Portuguese side Boavista but only playing for their B-team in the regional leagues.

On 5 June 2019, João Paulo returned to his home country and signed for Paulista. On 17 January of the following year, he was presented at Fortaleza after agreeing to a five-month contract.

On 21 August 2020, João Paulo was loaned to Série C side São José-RS. On 7 October, after failing to make an appearance, he returned to his parent club and was assigned to the under-23 team.

After spending the 2021 as a peripheral figure at Laion, João Paulo was loaned to Náutico on 31 December of that year. In December 2022, he was suspended for one month after failing a doping exam where tetrahydrocannabinol was detected, and after the suspension ended, he moved to Inter de Limeira also on loan.

On 18 April 2023, João Paulo signed for Ferroviária. On 23 December, he moved to Chapecoense on loan, where he would establish himself as a first-choice.

On 26 March 2025, after being rarely used back at AFE, João Paulo returned to Chape again on loan.

== Career statistics ==
As of 5 January 2026

Club	Season	League			State League		Cup		Continental		Other		Total	
Club	Season	Division	Apps	Goals	Apps	Goals	Apps	Goals	Apps	Goals	Apps	Goals	Apps	Goals
Grêmio Anápolis	2018	Goiano	—		1	0	—		—		—		1	0
Boavista B	2018–19	AF Porto Elite Pro	26	3	—		—		—		—		26	3
Paulista	2019	Paulista 2ª Divisão	—		16	7	—		—		—		16	7
Fortaleza	2020	Série A	0	0	1	0	0	0	0	0	0	0	1	0
Fortaleza	2021	Série A	0	0	3	0	0	0	0	0	5 (Note: Appearance(s) in Copa do Nordeste)	0	8	0
Fortaleza	Total		0	0	4	0	0	0	0	0	5	0	9	0
São José-RS (loan)	2020	Série C	0	0	—		0	0	—		—		0	0
Náutico (loan)	2022	Série B	18	0	4	0	0	0	—		1	0	23	0
Inter de Limeira (loan)	2023	Série D	—		8	1	—		—		—		8	1
Ferroviária	2023	Série D	13	0	—		—		—		—		13	0
Ferroviária	2025	Série B	—		4	0	—		—		—		4	0
Ferroviária	Total		13	0	4	0	—		—		—		17	0
Chapecoense (loan)	2024	Série B	16	1	5	0	—		—		—		21	1
Chapecoense (loan)	2025	Série B	31	1	—		—		—		—		31	1
Career total			104	5	42	8	0	0	0	0	6	0	152	13

== Honours ==
Paulista

- Campeonato Paulista Segunda Divisão: 2019

Fortaleza

- Campeonato Cearense: 2020, 2021

Náutico

- Campeonato Pernambucano: 2022
