= Marcondes =

Marcondes is both a surname and a given name. Notable people with the name include:

- Emiliano Marcondes (born 1995), Danish footballer
- Igor Marcondes (born 1997), Brazilian tennis player
- Matheus Marcondes (1903–?), Brazilian long-distance runner
- Marcondes Alves de Sousa (1868–1938), Brazilian politician
- Marcondes de Jesus Santos Junior (born 1993), Brazilian footballer
