= Aderbal Lana =

Brazilian footballer and manager (born 1946)

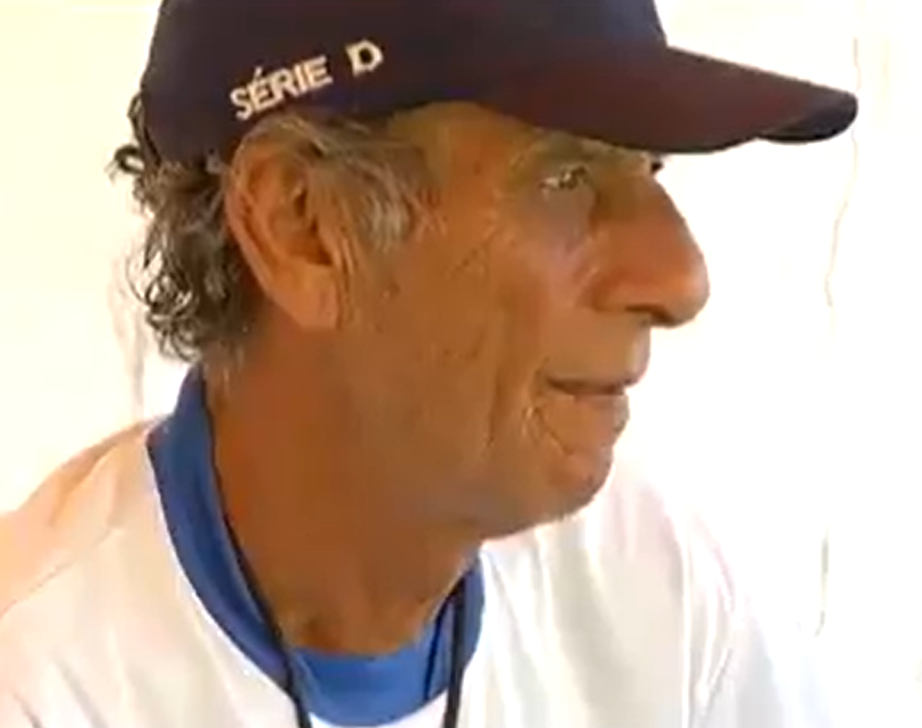
- Lana in 2015

Personal information
- Full name: Aderbal Domingos Lana
- Date of birth: 10 November 1946 (age 79)
- Place of birth: Uberlândia, Brazil
- Position: Left-back

Team information
- Current team: Amazonas (technical coordinator)

Senior career*
Years	Team	Apps	(Gls)
1967–1969	Uberlândia		
1969	Anápolis		
1970–1971	Itumbiara		
1971–1972	Atlético Goianiense		
1973	Itumbiara		

Managerial career
- 1973–1975: Itumbiara
- 1976: Goiânia
- 1977: Itumbiara
- 1978: Atlético Goianiense
- 1978: Uberlândia
- 1979: Itumbiara
- 1979–1982: Mixto
- 1982–1983: Goiás
- 1983: Vila Nova
- 1984: Anápolis
- 1985: Nacional-AM
- 1985: Mixto
- 1986–1989: Nacional-AM
- 1989: Rio Negro-AM
- 1991: Nacional-AM
- 1992–1994: Al Raed
- 1994–1995: Itumbiara
- 1996–2001: São Raimundo-AM
- 2001: Fortaleza
- 2001–2002: Nacional-AM
- 2002: Goiânia
- 2002–2003: São Raimundo-AM
- 2004: Uberaba
- 2004: Vila Nova
- 2004–2005: ADAP
- 2005: Anapolina
- 2005: Canedense
- 2006: Fast Clube
- 2007: Canedense
- 2007: Fast Clube
- 2008: Canedense
- 2008: Nacional-AM
- 2009: Anápolis
- 2009: Penarol-AM
- 2009: Fast Clube
- 2009: Nacional-AM
- 2010–2011: Fast Clube
- 2011: Sul América
- 2012: Princesa do Solimões
- 2012: Nacional-AM
- 2012–2013: Penarol-AM
- 2013: Nacional-AM
- 2014: Fast Clube
- 2015: Nacional-AM
- 2016: Rio Negro-AM
- 2017: Nacional-AM
- 2017: Rio Negro-AM
- 2017: Manaus
- 2018: Rio Negro-AM
- 2018: Manaus
- 2019: Nacional-AM
- 2019: Fast Clube
- 2019–2020: Nacional-AM
- 2020: Penarol-AM
- 2020: Baré
- 2021–2022: Princesa do Solimões
- 2022: São Raimundo-AM
- 2023: Princesa do Solimões
- 2024: Manaus
- 2024: Unidos do Alvorada
- 2024: Monte Roraima
- 2025: Amazonas
- 2025: Amazonas
- * Club domestic league appearances and goals

Aderbal Domingos Lana (born 10 November 1946), is a Brazilian football coach and former player who is the current technical coordinator of Amazonas.

Lana is known as the oldest active coach in Brazil.

== Playing career ==
Known as Aderbal as a player, he began his career with hometown side Uberlândia. A left-back, also played for Anápolis, Itumbiara and Atlético Goianiense before retiring with Itumbiara in 1973, aged 26, to become the club's head coach.

== Coaching career ==
After three years in charge of Itumbiara, Lana was appointed head coach of Goiânia in 1976, with the club in the Série A. He later returned to Itumbiara, having two distinct spells at the club and being in charge of Atlético Goianiense, Uberlândia and Mixto before taking over Goiás in 1982.

In 1985, after being in charge of Vila Nova and Anápolis, Lana took over Nacional-AM and led the club to a Campeonato Amazonense title in that year. In the following year, after a short period at Mixto, he returned to Nacional, again winning the state league.

After three years at Nacional, Lana moved to Rio Negro-AM in 1989, also leading the club to a state league title. He later returned to Nacional in 1991, and moved abroad to Al Raed in Saudi Arabia in the following year.

Lana only returned to the Amazonas state in 1996, after a period back at Itumbiara, to take over São Raimundo-AM. He remained at the club for nearly six years, winning three consecutive Amazonense titles (1997, 1998 and 1999) and two Copa Norte titles (1999 and 2000), also being a runner-up in 1999 Campeonato Brasileiro Série C against Fluminense, in addition to achieving a historic victory against São Paulo in the 2003 Copa do Brasil. Lana left São Raimundo for Fortaleza in September 2001.

Lana returned to Nacional in October 2001, but left on 22 April of the following year to take over Goiânia, before returning to São Raimundo in September 2002. He left the latter in August 2003.

After starting the 2004 season back at Itumbiara, Lana returned to Vila Nova in August of that year, remaining in charge until 15 October. After a short period at ADAP, he took over Série B side Anapolina in April 2005, leaving in July. He later led newly-created Canedense to a promotion from the Campeonato Goiano Terceira Divisão.

Lana returned to Amazonas in March 2006, and led Fast Clube to the finals of the state league. He was later in charge of Canedense in their first-ever Campeonato Goiano campaign, returning to Fast shortly after and then back to Canedense in January 2008.

Lana returned to Nacional on 11 March 2008, and began the 2009 season at the helm of Anápolis. He spent a short period at Penarol-AM before returning to Fast, and then leading Nacional in the Série D.

Back to Fast for the 2010 campaign, Lana moved to Sul América in the following year, before being officially presented as head coach of Princesa do Solimões on 2 December 2011. In April, however, he left to take over Nacional, winning the Amazonense title before returning to Penarol on 17 July 2012.

On 12 March 2013, Lana again returned to Nacional, but was sacked on 1 August. Back to Fast for the 2014 campaign, he returned to Nacional in December of that year; initially a youth coordinator, he later became the club's head coach again, being dismissed on 11 August 2015.

Lana returned to Rio Negro on 20 August 2016, and began the following season back at Nacional before returning to Rio Negro on 7 February. He later took over Manaus in April, and led the club to their first-ever Amazonense title before departing in June.

Back to Rio Negro for the 2018 season, Lana subsequently returned to Manaus before becoming an assistant coach at Iranduba's women's team. He was again named head coach of Nacional for the following year, leaving for Fast on 29 April but returning to his previous side on 16 June.

Lana left Naça in February 2020, being later named Penarol head coach. He subsequently moved to Baré, but left the club on 7 October after alleging squad shortage.

On 17 February 2021, Lana returned to Princesa. He left the club to return to Manaus on 1 November 2023, but left by mutual consent the following 12 February.

Lana took over Unidos do Alvorada on 20 February 2024, He was presented at Monte Roraima on 16 April, before leaving on 29 May.

On 8 November 2024, Princesa announced the signing of Lana for the ensuing season, but he departed the club 11 days later, amidst rumours to take over Amazonas FC. On 7 January 2025, he was in charge of the latter club during the pre-season, returning to a second division side after nearly 20 years, but left the role to become a technical coordinator on 23 February.

On 30 October 2025, Lana returned to the role of head coach at Amazonas for the remaining four matches of the season. After failing to avoid relegation, he returned to his previous role.

== Coaching statistics ==
As of 21 February 2025

Coaching record by team and tenure
Team	From	To	Record								Ref
Team	From	To	G	W	D	L	GF	GA	GD	Win %	Ref
Itumbiara	1 January 1973	31 December 1975	52	21	16	15	59	52	+7	40.38	
Goiânia	1 January 1976	31 December 1976	36	16	9	11	55	50	+5	44.44	
Itumbiara	1 January 1977	31 December 1977	18	11	2	5	26	16	+10	61.11	
Atlético Goianiense	1 January 1978	4 September 1978	20	10	7	3	27	14	+13	50.00	
Uberlândia	7 September 1978	31 December 1978	22	4	10	8	18	31	−13	18.18	
Itumbiara	1 January 1979	29 December 1979	29	11	8	10	33	31	+2	37.93	
Mixto	30 December 1979	20 February 1982	66	23	14	29	95	91	+4	34.85	
Goiás	10 March 1982	8 August 1983	82	38	25	19	101	67	+34	46.34	
Vila Nova	10 August 1983	1 December 1983	16	6	4	6	24	25	−1	37.50	
Anápolis	1984	1984	22	8	6	8	19	25	−6	36.36	
Nacional-AM	1985	1985	22	10	4	8	39	29	+10	45.45	
Mixto	1985	1985	26	11	10	5	39	25	+14	42.31	
Nacional-AM	1986	1989	89	44	21	24	124	72	+52	49.44	
Rio Negro-AM	1989	1989	20	9	10	1	22	7	+15	45.00	
Nacional-AM	1991	1991	11	6	3	2	10	6	+4	54.55	
Al Raed	1 June 1992	30 May 1994	44	13	11	20	51	74	−23	29.55	
Itumbiara	1 August 1994	10 December 1995	62	20	22	20	71	71	+0	32.26	
São Raimundo-AM	1 January 1996	4 July 2001	203	109	47	47	372	208	+164	53.69	
Fortaleza	1 August 2001	1 December 2001	26	11	7	8	40	27	+13	42.31	
Nacional-AM	18 December 2001	8 April 2002	9	4	3	2	21	13	+8	44.44	
Goiânia	10 April 2002	2 May 2002	5	1	0	4	3	7	−4	20.00	
São Raimundo-AM	10 May 2002	1 October 2003	65	25	14	26	109	89	+20	38.46	
Uberaba	10 April 2004	22 June 2004	8	1	2	5	4	12	−8	12.50	
Vila Nova	12 August 2004	19 October 2004	12	6	1	5	14	10	+4	50.00	
ADAP	28 November 2004	27 March 2005	13	5	5	3	28	18	+10	38.46	
Anapolina	10 March 2005	16 July 2005	16	6	4	6	28	24	+4	37.50	
Canedense	2005	2005	—	−	−	−	−	−	—	—	
Fast Clube	3 January 2006	10 September 2006	27	14	5	8	52	30	+22	51.85	
Canedense	5 January 2007	5 February 2007	6	1	3	2	9	13	−4	16.67	
Fast Clube	4 March 2007	11 October 2007	29	13	7	9	59	38	+21	44.83	
Canedense	10 January 2008	3 February 2008	5	1	1	3	2	5	−3	20.00	
Nacional-AM	14 March 2008	5 April 2008	3	2	1	0	8	4	+4	66.67	
Anápolis	14 January 2009	9 February 2009	4	0	2	2	3	7	−4	0.00	
Penarol-AM	28 February 2009	6 April 2009	5	2	1	2	7	6	+1	40.00	
Fast Clube	8 April 2009	24 June 2009	10	4	4	2	13	10	+3	40.00	
Nacional-AM	9 July 2009	30 August 2009	6	3	1	2	9	10	−1	50.00	
Fast Clube	1 February 2010	26 February 2011	21	11	3	7	46	24	+22	52.38	
Sul América	28 February 2011	15 May 2011	11	2	4	5	16	23	−7	18.18	
Princesa do Solimões	12 January 2012	5 March 2012	11	4	4	3	15	11	+4	36.36	
Nacional-AM	20 March 2012	28 May 2012	11	4	3	4	16	15	+1	36.36	
Penarol-AM	20 June 2012	26 March 2013	14	6	2	6	36	21	+15	42.86	
Nacional-AM	2 April 2013	2 August 2013	21	14	2	5	35	18	+17	66.67	
Fast Clube	10 January 2014	15 April 2014	13	5	6	2	27	18	+9	38.46	
Nacional-AM	9 March 2015	1 August 2015	26	18	3	5	56	20	+36	69.23	
Rio Negro-AM	1 August 2016	21 October 2016	13	4	3	6	16	19	−3	30.77	
Nacional-AM	16 February 2017	6 April 2017	6	4	1	1	15	10	+5	66.67	
Rio Negro-AM	8 April 2017	14 May 2017	10	4	1	5	16	17	−1	40.00	
Manaus	20 May 2017	12 June 2017	4	2	2	0	5	2	+3	50.00	
Rio Negro-AM	8 January 2018	8 March 2018	7	3	1	3	10	10	+0	42.86	
Manaus	8 March 2018	1 August 2018	20	12	2	6	37	20	+17	60.00	
Nacional-AM	1 January 2019	8 March 2019	8	4	1	3	10	7	+3	50.00	
Fast Clube	10 March 2019	27 April 2019	9	0	4	5	4	12	−8	0.00	
Nacional-AM	25 July 2019	1 February 2020	4	1	2	1	3	2	+1	25.00	
Penarol-AM	2020	2020	—	−	−	−	−	−	—	—	
Baré	5 March 2020	7 October 2020	8	3	2	3	14	16	−2	37.50	
Princesa do Solimões	17 February 2021	1 November 2023	62	23	27	12	83	61	+22	37.10	
Manaus	1 November 2023	12 February 2024	6	2	2	2	8	5	+3	33.33	
Unidos do Alvorada	20 February 2024	14 April 2024	6	2	1	3	8	10	−2	33.33	
Monte Roraima	16 April 2024	29 May 2024	5	2	2	1	7	4	+3	40.00	
Princesa do Solimões	8 November 2024	19 November 2024	—	−	−	−	−	−	—	—	
Amazonas	28 December 2024	23 February 2025	6	3	2	1	14	5	+9	50.00	
Amazonas	30 October 2025	30 November 2025	4	1	1	2	5	5	+0	25.00	
Total			1,395	603	371	421	2,096	1,572	+524	43.23	—

== Honours ==
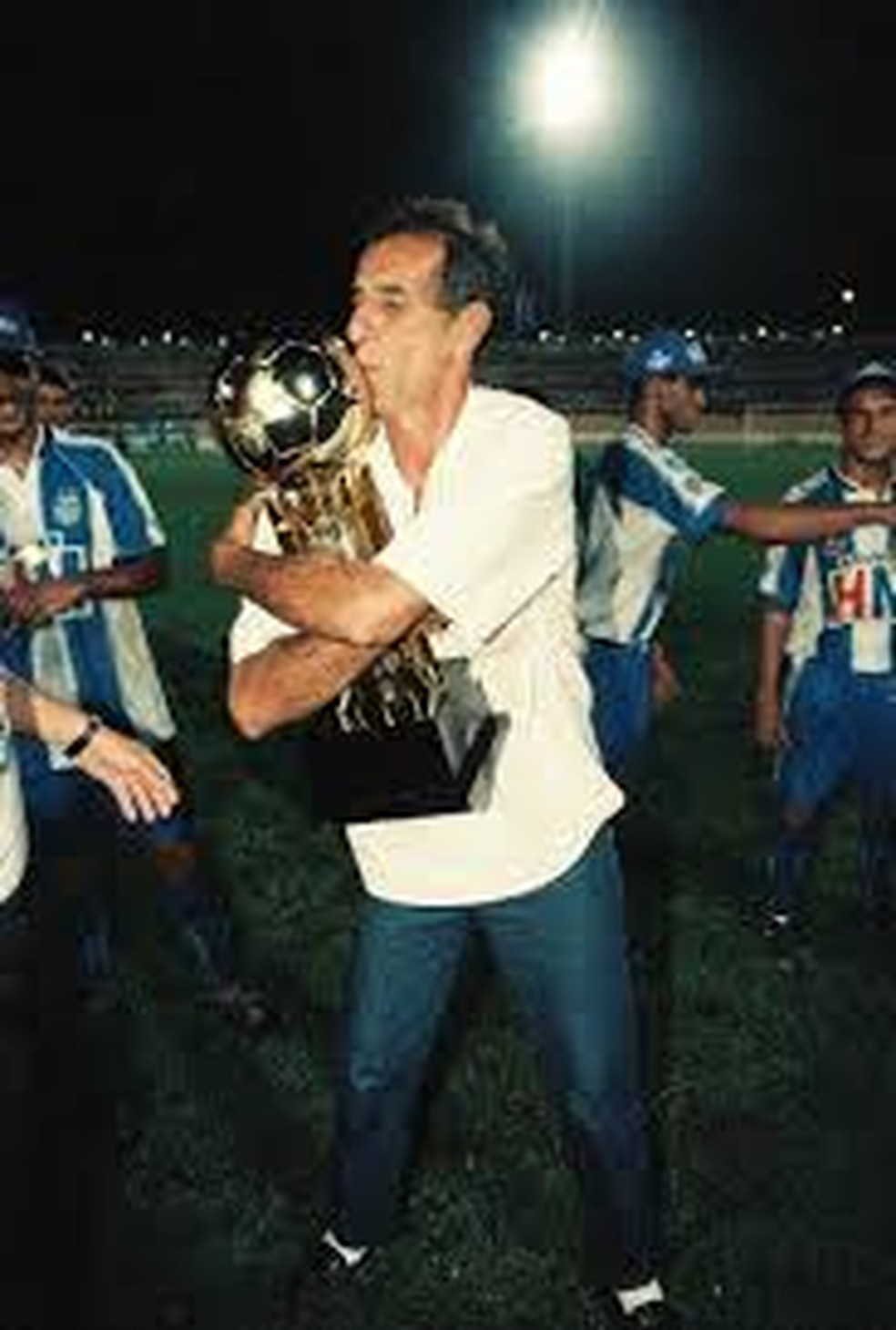
Lana with the Copa Norte trophy

=== Coach ===
Nacional-AM

- Campeonato Amazonense: 1986, 1991, 2012, 2015

Rio Negro-AM

- Campeonato Amazonense: 1989

São Raimundo-AM

- Copa Norte: 1999, 2000, 2001
- Campeonato Amazonense: 1997, 1998, 1999

Manaus

- Campeonato Amazonense: 2017
