= Vitor Barreto =

Brazilian footballer (born 2000)

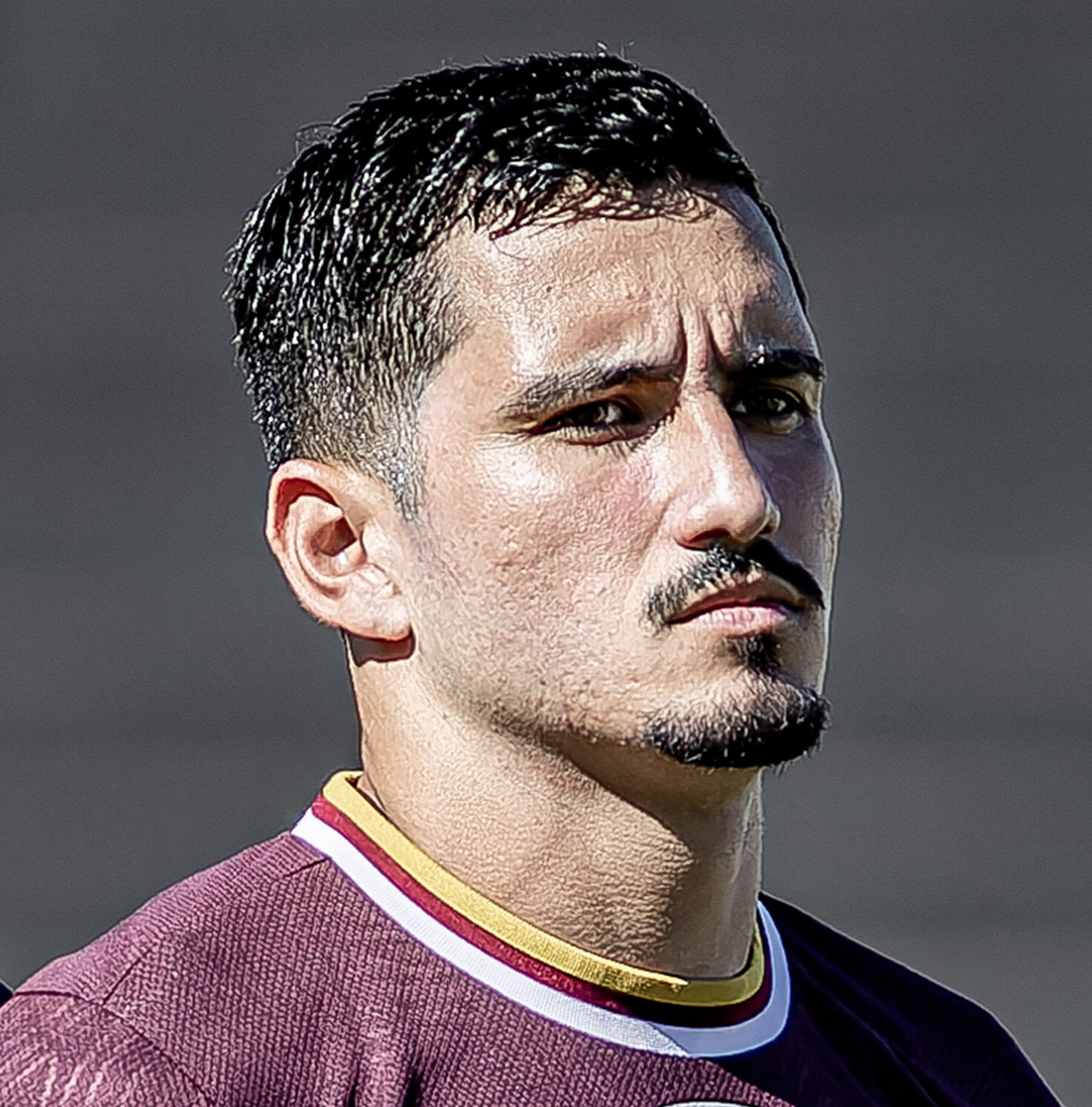
- Barreto in 2024

Personal information
- Full name: Vitor Prado Barreto
- Date of birth: 1 April 2000 (age 26)
- Place of birth: Ubatuba, Brazil
- Height: 1.82 m (6 ft 0 in)
- Position: Forward

Team information
- Current team: Ferroviária
- Number: 11

Youth career
- 2018–2019: Paulista
- 2019–2020: Grêmio

Senior career*
Years	Team	Apps	(Gls)
2021	Grêmio	0	(0)
2022–2023	Capivariano	15	(1)
2022	→ XV de Jaú (loan)	8	(3)
2022	→ Valeriodoce (loan)	4	(0)
2023	→ Aimoré (loan)	10	(0)
2023	→ Ferroviária (loan)	22	(5)
2024–	Ferroviária	101	(21)
- * Club domestic league appearances and goals as of 9 November 2026

Vitor Prado Barreto (born 1 April 2000), known as Vitor Barreto, is a Brazilian footballer who plays as a forward for Ferroviária.

== Career ==
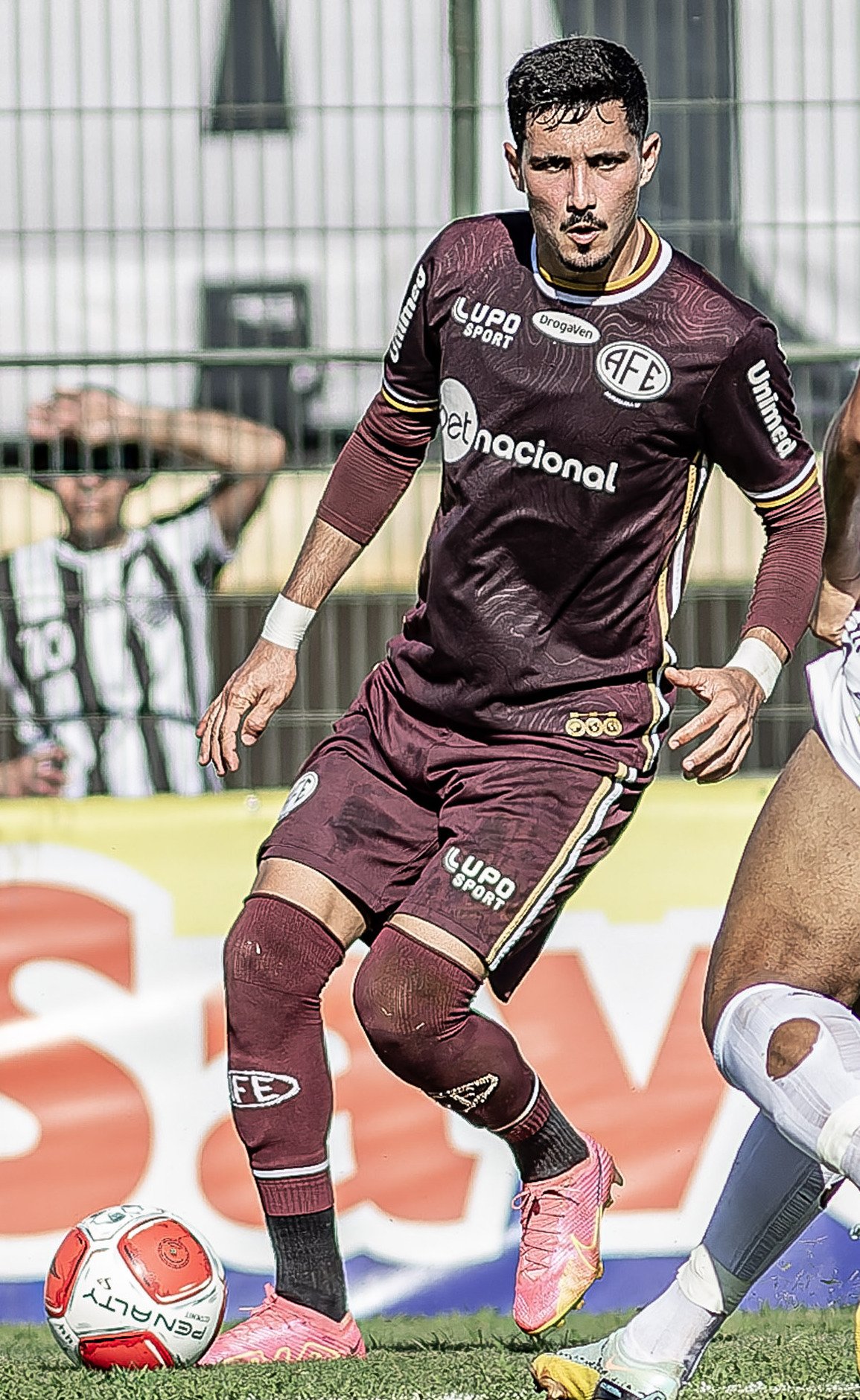
Barreto playing for Ferroviária in 2024

Born in Ubatuba, São Paulo, Barreto began his career with Paulista before joining Grêmio's youth sides in 2019. He played with the under-23 squad of the latter in 2021, before moving to Capivariano for the 2022 season.

Barreto served loan stints at XV de Jaú, Valeriodoce and Aimoré, before moving to Ferroviária also in a temporary deal on 28 April 2023. In September, after helping AFE to achieve promotion to the Série C, he signed a permanent three-year deal with the club.

An undisputed starter during the 2024 season as Ferroviária achieved another promotion, Barreto struggled with injuries during most of the 2025 campaign. Back to a starting spot, he played his 100th match for the side on 23 April 2026, in a 1–0 away win over Ituano.

== Career statistics ==
As of 9 November 2026

Club	Season	League			State League		Cup		Continental		Other		Total	
Club	Season	Division	Apps	Goals	Apps	Goals	Apps	Goals	Apps	Goals	Apps	Goals	Apps	Goals
Capivariano	2022	Paulista A3	—		15	1	—		—		—		15	1
XV de Jaú (loan)	2022	Paulista 2ª Divisão	—		8	3	—		—		—		8	3
Valeriodoce (loan)	2022	Mineiro Segunda Divisão	—		4	0	—		—		—		4	0
Aimoré (loan)	2023	Série D	—		10	0	—		—		—		10	0
Ferroviária	2023	Série D	22	5	—		—		—		—		22	5
Ferroviária	2024	Série C	22	4	16	4	—		—		—		38	8
Ferroviária	2025	Série B	14	1	5	0	—		—		—		19	1
Ferroviária	2026	Série C	21	6	23	6	—		—		—		44	12
Ferroviária	Total		79	16	44	10	—		—		—		123	26
Career total			79	16	81	14	0	0	0	0	0	0	160	30
