= Vinicius Kauê =

Brazilian footballer

Personal information
- Full name: Vinicius Kauê Ribeiro Ferreira
- Date of birth: 1 March 2003 (age 23)
- Place of birth: Presidente Prudente, Brazil
- Position: Left back

Team information
- Current team: Ferroviária
- Number: 26

Youth career
- Presidente Prudente FC
- 2017–2023: Athletico Paranaense

Senior career*
Years	Team	Apps	(Gls)
2021–2024	Athletico Paranaense	30	(1)
2024–2026	Guarani	5	(0)
2026–	Ferroviária	0	(0)

International career^{‡}
2023–	Brazil U20	1	(0)
- * Club domestic league appearances and goals as of 9 November 2026 ‡ National team caps and goals as of 14:34, 27 April 2023 (UTC)

Vinicius Kauê Ribeiro Ferreira (born 1 March 2003), known as Vinicius Kauê, is a Brazilian footballer who plays as a left back for Ferroviária.

== Club career ==
Vinicius Kauê was born in Presidente Prudente, São Paulo, and played as a forward for hometown side Presidente Prudente FC before joining Athletico Paranaense in 2017. In March 2019, he signed a professional contract with the latter club.

Vinicius Kauê made his first team debut on 17 April 2021, coming on as a late substitute for Jáderson in a 4–0 Campeonato Paranaense home loss against Operário Ferroviário. He scored his first senior goal eight days later, netting the opener in a 2–0 home win over Rio Branco-PR.

Vinicius Kauê made his Série A debut on 9 December 2021, replacing Márcio Azevedo late into a 1–1 away draw against Sport Recife.

== Career statistics ==
As of 27 April 2023

Club	Season	League			State League		Cup		Continental		Other		Total	
Club	Season	Division	Apps	Goals	Apps	Goals	Apps	Goals	Apps	Goals	Apps	Goals	Apps	Goals
Athletico Paranaense	2021	Série A	1	0	6	1	0	0	0	0	—		7	1
Athletico Paranaense	2022	Série A	0	0	7	0	0	0	0	0	0	0	7	0
Athletico Paranaense	2023	Série A	0	0	0	0	0	0	—		—		0	0
Career total			1	0	13	1	0	0	0	0	0	0	14	1
