= Márcio Zanardi =

Brazilian football manager

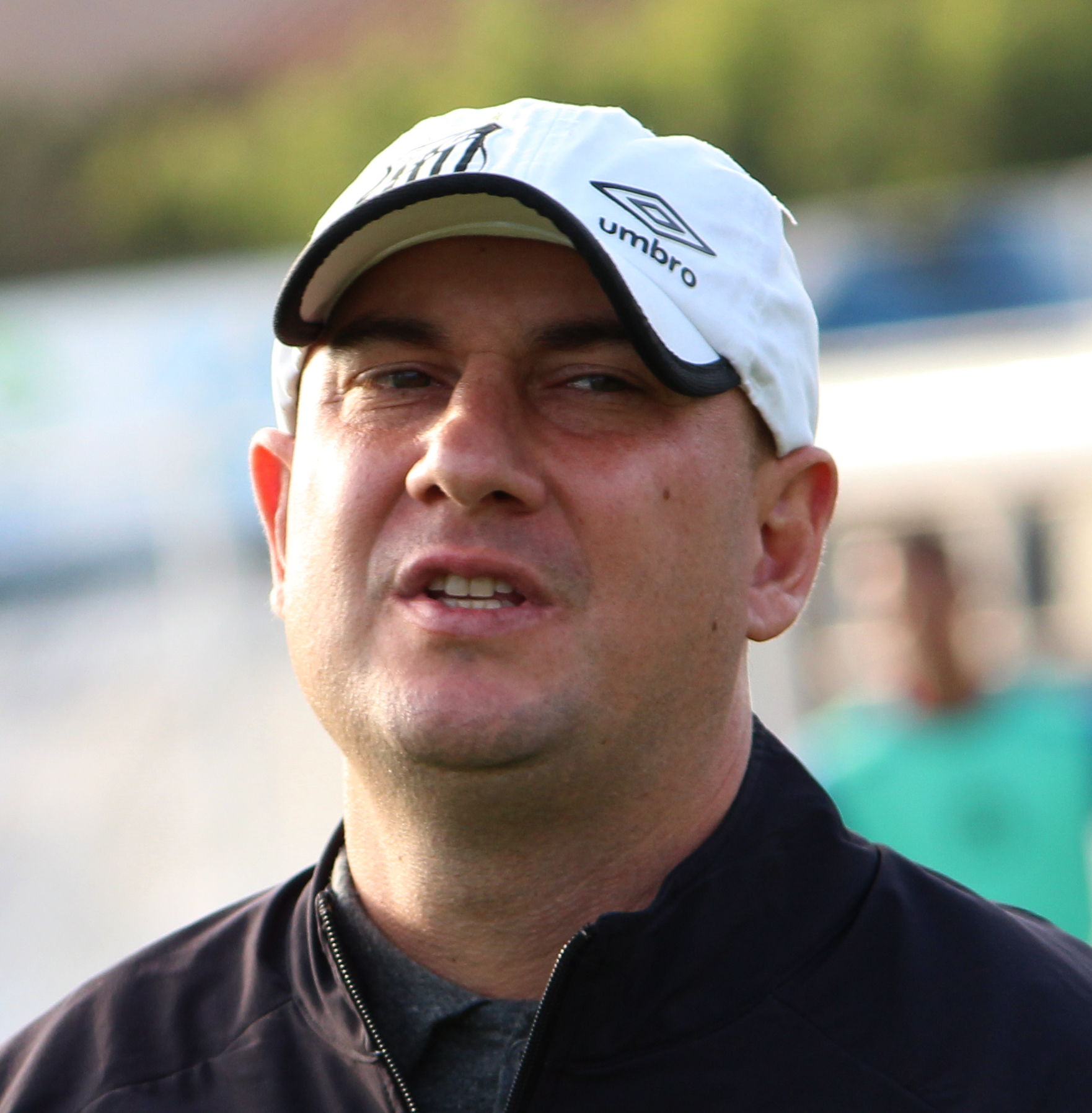
- Zanardi as coach of Santos U20 in 2019

Personal information
- Full name: Márcio Zanardi Gomes da Silva
- Date of birth: 11 July 1978 (age 48)
- Place of birth: São Paulo, Brazil

Team information
- Current team: Portuguesa (head coach)

Managerial career
- Years: Team
- 2004–2006: PAEC U15
- 2006–2007: FC Vilnius U20
- 2007–2010: Al-Nasr U20
- 2012: Corinthians U13
- 2013–2015: Corinthians U15
- 2015–2016: Corinthians U17
- 2017: Portuguesa U20
- 2017: Portuguesa (interim)
- 2017–2018: Portuguesa (assistant)
- 2018–2019: Guarani U20
- 2019–2020: Santos U20
- 2020–2021: São Bernardo U20
- 2021–2024: São Bernardo
- 2024: Goiás
- 2024–2025: Botafogo-SP
- 2025: Amazonas
- 2026: Figueirense
- 2026: Ponte Preta
- 2027–: Portuguesa

Márcio Zanardi Gomes da Silva (born 11 July 1978) is a Brazilian professional football coach, currently the head coach of Portuguesa.

== Career ==
Born in São Paulo, Zanardi began his career with Pão de Açúcar EC's under-15 sides before moving to Lithuania in 2006, with FC Vilnius. He then worked for three years in the United Arab Emirates with Al-Nasr, before returning to Brazil in 2010 with Corinthians.

After working in the under-13, under-15 and under-17 sides of Corinthians, Zanardi was dismissed by the club on 21 November 2016. The following 3 May, he was appointed head coach of Portuguesa's under-20 squad.

In August 2017, after being an interim of the main squad for one match, Zanardi was promoted to Lusa's main squad as an assistant. The following 20 February, he moved to Guarani and took over the under-20s.

On 19 February 2019, Zanardi was named head coach of the under-20 side of Santos. He left roughly a year later, and took over the same category at São Bernardo shortly after.

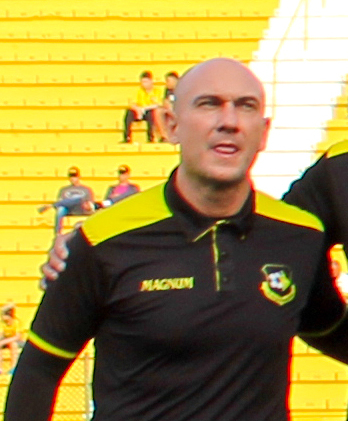
Zanardi as head coach of São Bernardo in 2022

On 1 October 2021, after first team head coach Ricardo Catalá left, Zanardi was appointed in charge of São Bernardo for the remainder of the Copa Paulista, and led the side to their second-ever title of the tournament. He remained in charge of the club in the following years, achieving promotion in the 2022 Série D and reaching the quarterfinals of the 2023 Campeonato Paulista.

On 31 March 2024, Zanardi was named head coach of Série B side Goiás. He was sacked from the club on 4 August, after a 2–1 loss to Novorizontino.

On 27 September 2024, Zanardi replaced Portuguese Paulo Gomes at the helm of Botafogo-SP also in the second division. The following 18 May, after just three wins into the new season, he was sacked.

On 8 July 2025, Zanardi was appointed head coach of Amazonas also in the second division. He was dismissed on 29 October, with the club still in the relegation zone.

On 25 January 2026, Zanardi was named head coach of Figueirense in the Série C. On 14 April, he was sacked, and took over Ponte Preta in division two on 11 June.

On 26 August 2026, Zanardi resigned from Ponte as the club's financial situation worsened; he left with no wins in 12 matches. On 3 October, he returned to Lusa for the upcoming season, now named head coach of the first team.

== Personal life ==
Zanardi's older brother Caio is also a football coach.

== Managerial statistics ==
As of 28 August 2026

Managerial record by team and tenure
Team	Nat.	From	To	Record								Ref
Team	Nat.	From	To	G	W	D	L	GF	GA	GD	Win %	Ref
Portuguesa (interim)	(Brazil)	12 August 2017	13 August 2017	1	0	1	0	1	1	+0	0.00	
São Bernardo	(Brazil)	1 October 2021	31 March 2024	98	45	29	24	108	71	+37	45.92	
Goiás	(Brazil)	31 March 2024	4 August 2024	21	8	4	9	26	22	+4	38.10	
Botafogo-SP	(Brazil)	3 October 2024	18 May 2025	30	7	8	15	26	42	−16	23.33	
Amazonas	(Brazil)	8 July 2025	29 October 2025	19	4	6	9	21	30	−9	21.05	
Figueirense	(Brazil)	25 January 2026	14 April 2026	12	4	1	7	12	16	−4	33.33	
Ponte Preta	(Brazil)	11 June 2026	26 August 2026	12	0	2	10	6	28	−22	0.00	
Portuguesa	(Brazil)	3 October 2026	present	0	0		0	0	0	+0	—	
Career total				193	68	51	74	200	210	−10	35.23	—

== Honours ==
São Bernardo

- Copa Paulista: 2021
