= Gustavo Medina =

Brazilian footballer (born 2001)

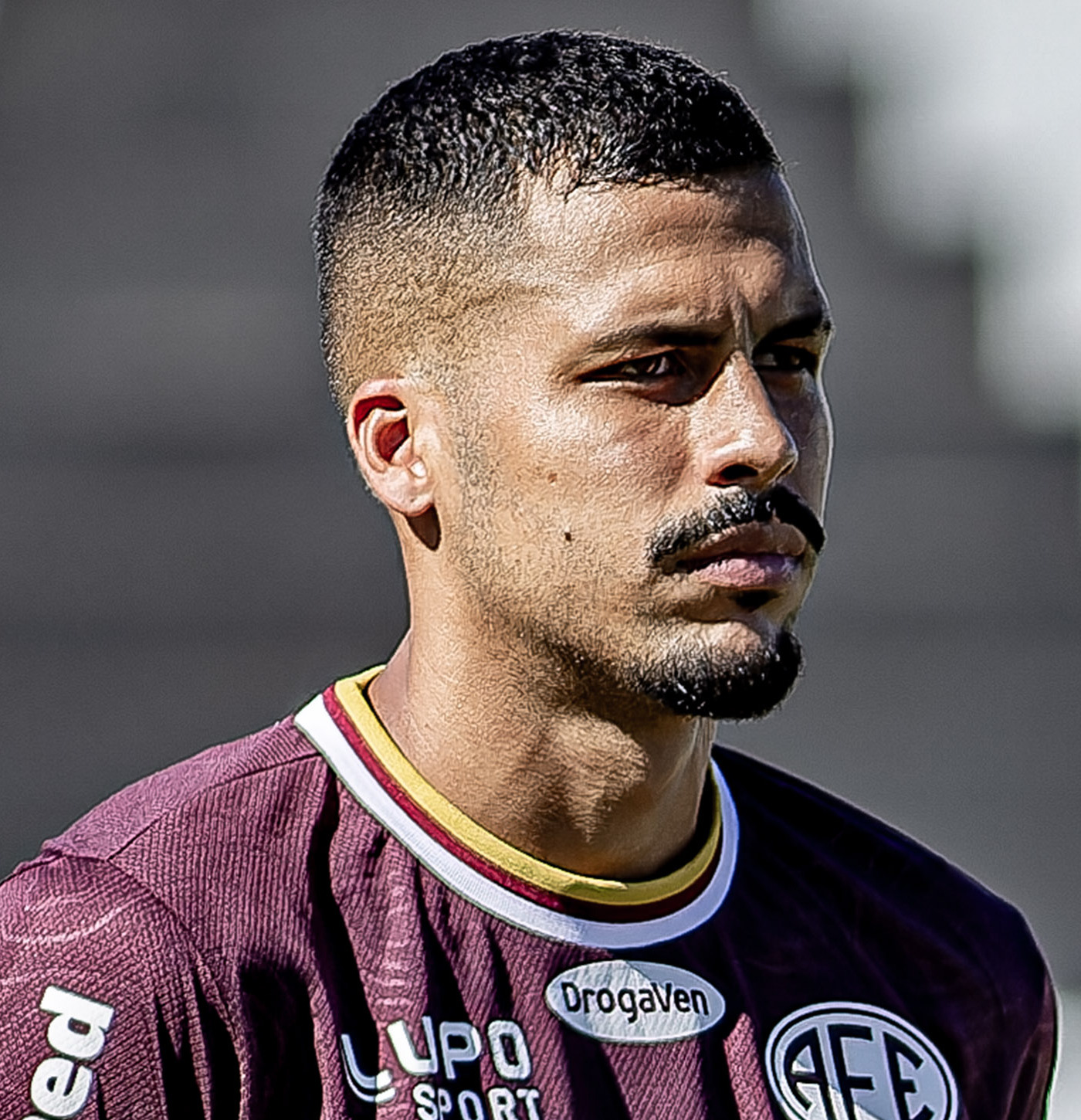
- Medina in 2024

Personal information
- Full name: Gustavo dos Santos Silva Medina
- Date of birth: 9 July 2001 (age 25)
- Place of birth: Rio Branco, Brazil
- Height: 1.84 m (6 ft 0 in)
- Position: Centre-back

Team information
- Current team: Ferroviária
- Number: 13

Youth career
- Projeto Pagão
- Avaí
- 2016–2020: Ferroviária
- 2020: → Valladolid (loan)
- 2020: → Cruzeiro (loan)

Senior career*
Years	Team	Apps	(Gls)
2020–	Ferroviária	142	(3)
2023	→ Taubaté (loan)	4	(0)
- * Club domestic league appearances and goals as of 9 November 2026

Gustavo dos Santos Silva Medina (born 9 July 2001), known as Gustavo Medina or just Medina, is a Brazilian footballer who plays as a centre-back for Ferroviária.

== Career ==
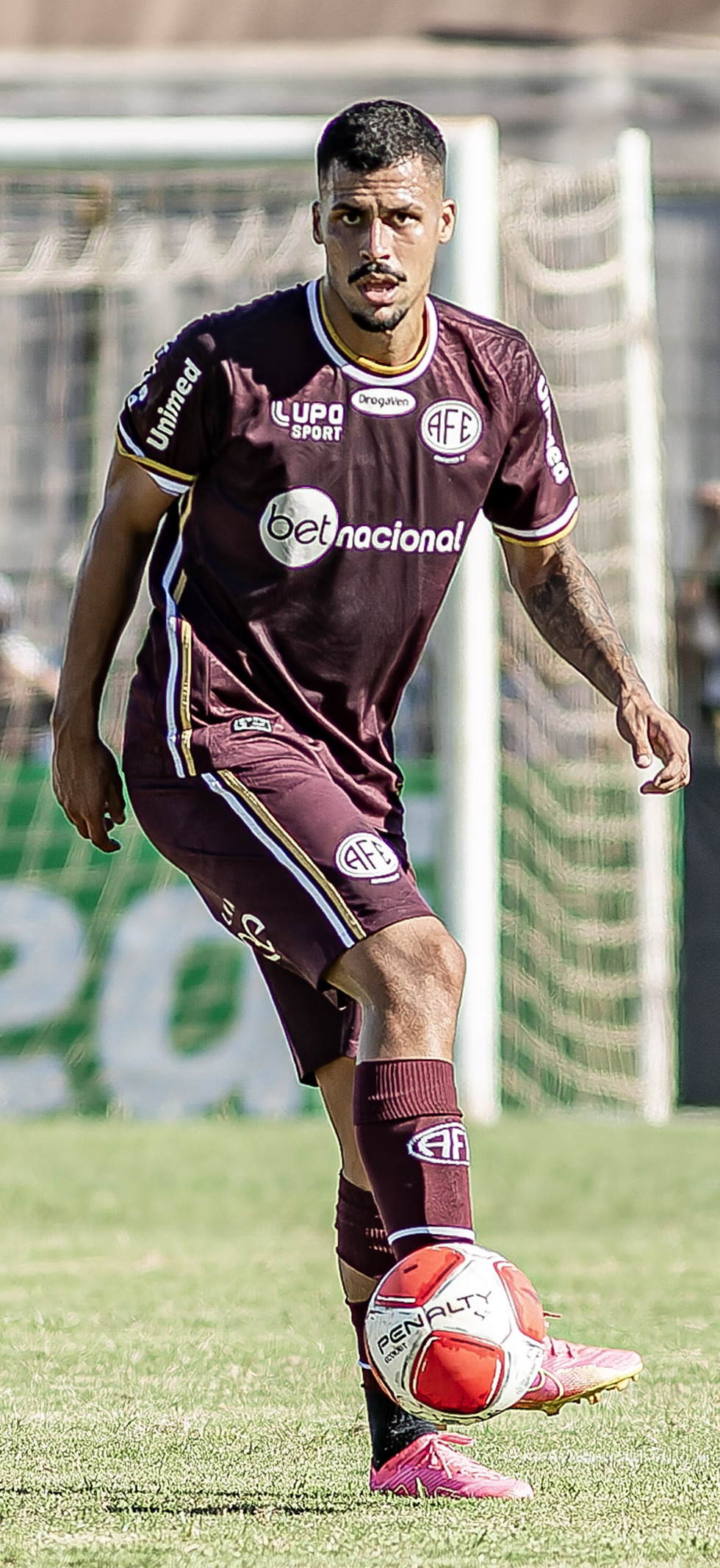
Medina playing for Ferroviária in 2024

Born in Rio Branco, Acre, Medina began his career in a Meninos da Vila youth school in Cuiabá, and later played for a project in Santos called Projeto Pagão and Avaí before joining the youth sides of Ferroviária in late 2016. On 31 January 2020, he was loaned to Spanish side Real Valladolid for six months, with a buyout clause set on R$ 1 million.

On 6 August 2020, Medina joined Cruzeiro also on loan, but was sent back to his parent club in November, after a "serious indiscipline problem". He then made his senior debut with AFE on 9 December, starting in a 2–0 away loss to Marília, for the year's Copa Paulista.

After failing to establish himself as a regular starter, Medina was loaned to Taubaté on 10 January 2023. He returned to Ferroviária in April, but only became a regular starter for the club in the following year.

On 5 November 2024, Medina renewed his contract with Ferroviária until the end of 2025. He scored his first senior goal the following 17 April, netting his side's second in a 2–0 Série B home win over Atlético Goianiense.

== Career statistics ==
As of match played 9 November 2026

Club	Season	League			State League		Cup		Continental		Other		Total	
Club	Season	Division	Apps	Goals	Apps	Goals	Apps	Goals	Apps	Goals	Apps	Goals	Apps	Goals
Ferroviária	2020	Série D	0	0	0	0	—		—		1 (Note: Appearance(s) in Copa Paulista)	0	1	0
Ferroviária	2021	Série D	14	0	1	0	—		—		—		15	0
Ferroviária	2022	Série D	3	0	1	0	—		—		—		4	0
Ferroviária	2023	Série D	6	0	—		—		—		—		6	0
Ferroviária	2024	Série C	24	0	14	0	—		—		—		38	0
Ferroviária	2025	Série B	27	1	16	0	—		—		—		43	1
Ferroviária	2026	Série C	15	0	21	2	—		—		—		36	2
Ferroviária	Total		89	1	53	2	—		—		1	0	143	3
Taubaté (loan)	2023	Paulista A2	—		4	0	—		—		—		4	0
Career total			89	1	57	2	0	0	0	0	1	0	147	3
