= Rafael Lacerda =

Brazilian footballer (born 1984)

- Lacerda in 2024

Personal information
- Full name: Rafael dos Santos Lacerda
- Date of birth: 12 June 1984 (age 42)
- Place of birth: São Leopoldo, Brazil
- Height: 1.87 m (6 ft 2 in)
- Position: Centre-back

Team information
- Current team: Vitória (head coach)

Youth career
- Ulbra

Senior career*
Years	Team	Apps	(Gls)
2002–2003	Ulbra		
2004	Brasil de Farroupilha		
2005–2006	Sapucaiense		
2007	Caxias	1	(0)
2008	Sapucaiense	15	(3)
2008	Toledo		
2009	Sapucaiense	12	(2)
2009	Caxias	9	(2)
2009–2010	Joinville	4	(0)
2010–2011	Luverdense	22	(2)
2011	→ ASA (loan)	0	(0)
2011	→ Red Bull Brasil (loan)	5	(0)
2012	Caxias	17	(0)
2012–2013	Goiás	7	(0)
2013	Portuguesa	0	(0)
2014	Paysandu	7	(0)
2014–2015	Aimoré	12	(0)
2015–2016	Caxias	33	(6)
2017	São Paulo-RS	15	(0)
2017	Yuen Long	0	(0)
2017–2018	São Luiz	1	(0)
2018	Concórdia	11	(0)
2018	Aimoré	0	(0)

Managerial career
- 2019: Caxias (assistant)
- 2019–2021: Caxias
- 2021–2022: Aimoré
- 2022–2023: Amazonas
- 2024: ABC
- 2024: Barra-SC
- 2024: Amazonas
- 2025: Vila Nova
- 2025–2026: Atlético Goianiense
- 2026: Chapecoense
- 2026–: Vitória
- * Club domestic league appearances and goals

Rafael dos Santos Lacerda (Chinese: 拉斯達; born 12 June 1984) is a Brazilian football coach and former player who played as a centre-back. He is the current head coach of Vitória.

== Playing career ==
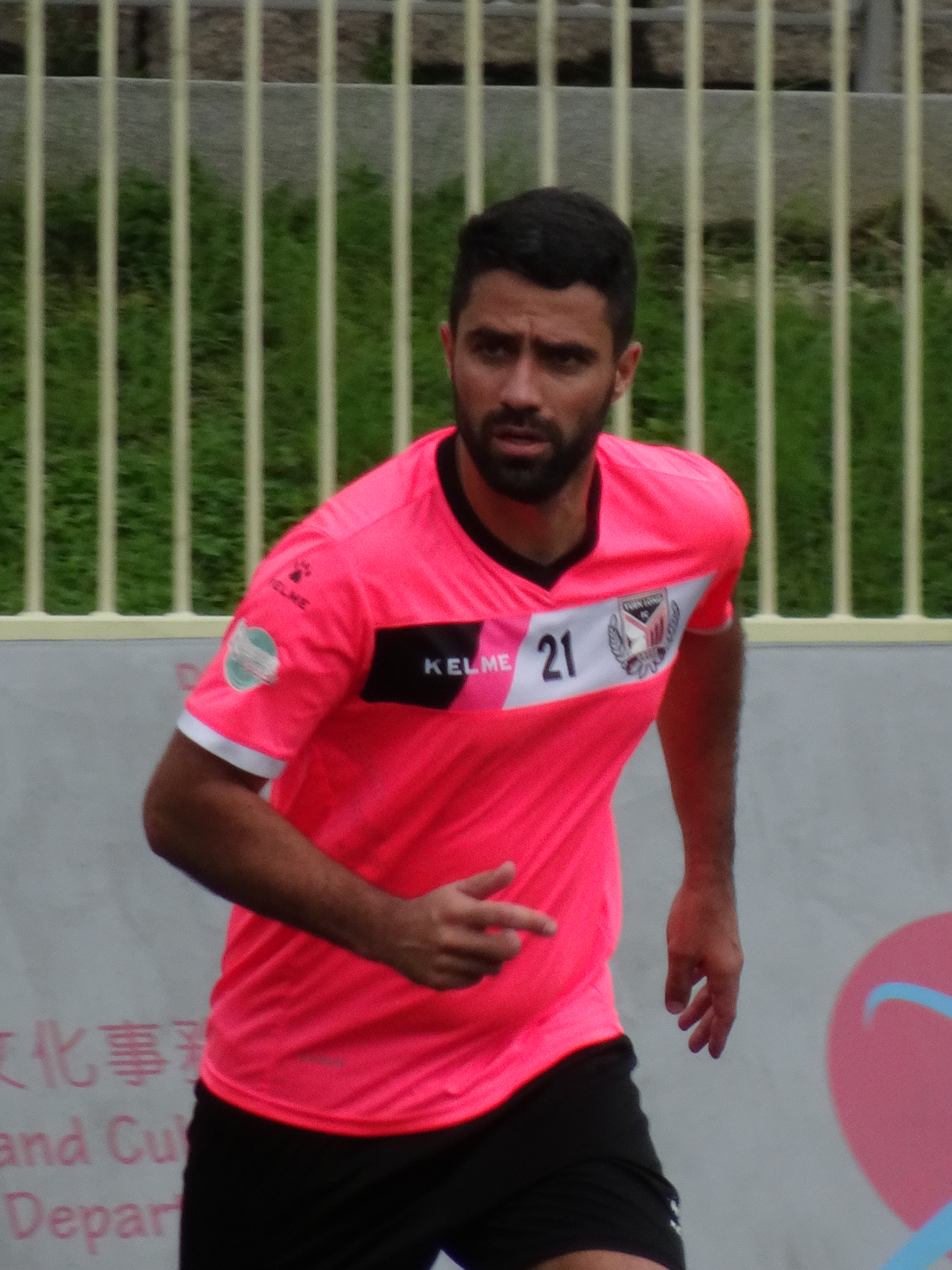
Lacerda playing for Yuen Long in 2017

Born in São Leopoldo, Rio Grande do Sul, Lacerda began his career with local Ulbra, and continued to appear in his native state until 2008, representing Brasil de Farroupilha and Sapucaiense. After a brief period in Paraná, playing for Toledo CW, he returned to Sapucaiense, and signed with Caxias shortly after.

In August 2009 Lacerda signed with Joinville. In June of the following year, he finally left his native region and signed with Luverdense.

After loan stints to ASA (where he failed to make a single appearance) and Red Bull Brasil, Lacerda returned to Caxias in December 2011.

On 15 May 2012 Lacerda signed with Série B side Goiás. He made his professional debut on 7 July, starting in a 3–3 away draw against Bragantino, and contributed with six appearances (five starts) as his side achieved promotion as champions.

On 6 September 2013, after just one match for Goiás during the year, Lacerda signed with Portuguesa. After only one unused substitute appearance, he was presented at Paysandu on 4 February 2014.

After a spell at Aimoré, Lacerda returned to Caxias for his third spell in July 2015. After leaving the latter at the end of the 2016 season, he moved to São Paulo-RS.

On 28 July 2017, Hong Kong Premier League club Yuen Long announced on Facebook that they had signed Lacerda. However, he left the club the following month, and signed for São Luiz.

On 1 February 2018, Concórdia confirmed the signing of Lacerda. He then played in the year's Copa FGF for Aimoré before retiring at the age of 34.

== Coaching career ==
Shortly after retiring, Lacerda returned to his first club Caxias as an assistant coach, before being named head coach of the side on 30 July 2019. He left the post on 9 May 2021, after the club's elimination from the Campeonato Gaúcho.

On 27 July 2021, Lacerda was appointed head coach of another club he represented as a player, Aimoré. He left the club by mutual consent the following 14 March, and took over Amazonas twelve days later.

Lacerda led Amazonas to a first-ever promotion to the Série C, and won the 2023 Campeonato Amazonense with the club, their first title in the top tier. On 11 September 2023, after losing the first two matches of the 2023 Série C second stage, he was dismissed.

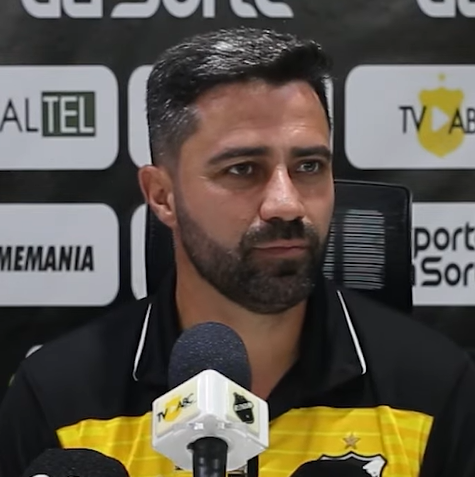
Lacerda as head coach of ABC in 2023

On 25 November 2023, Lacerda was confirmed as head coach of ABC for the upcoming season. He left the club by mutual consent the following 10 March, and was announced at the helm of Barra-SC on 2 April 2024.

On 24 May 2024, Lacerda left Barra after paying for his release clause by himself, and was announced back at Amazonas just hours later. On 19 November, after avoiding relegation, he left by mutual consent, and took over fellow second division side Vila Nova seven days later.

Despite winning the 2025 Campeonato Goiano, Lacerda was sacked by Vila on 11 June 2025. On 19 July, he moved to rivals Atlético Goianiense.

On 7 March 2026, after losing the first leg of the 2026 Campeonato Goiano finals, Lacerda was sacked. On 30 May, he was named in charge of Chapecoense in the Série A.

On 9 November 2026, Lacerda resigned from Chape – already relegated – after receiving an offer from another top tier club, and was announced as head coach of Vitória the following day.

== Managerial statistics ==
As of 10 November 2026

Managerial record by team and tenure
Team	Nat.	From	To	Record								Ref
Team	Nat.	From	To	G	W	D	L	GF	GA	GD	Win %	Ref
Caxias	(Brazil)	30 July 2019	10 May 2021	57	24	16	17	66	51	+15	42.11	
Aimoré	(Brazil)	27 July 2021	14 March 2022	30	13	7	10	41	26	+15	43.33	
Amazonas	(Brazil)	13 April 2022	11 September 2023	55	29	15	11	89	46	+43	52.73	
ABC	(Brazil)	25 November 2023	10 March 2024	17	6	10	1	28	18	+10	35.29	
Barra-SC	(Brazil)	2 April 2024	24 May 2024	3	1	1	1	4	2	+2	33.33	
Amazonas	(Brazil)	24 May 2024	19 November 2024	31	12	8	11	25	28	−3	38.71	
Vila Nova	(Brazil)	26 November 2024	11 June 2025	33	15	9	9	31	22	+9	45.45	
Atlético Goianiense	(Brazil)	19 July 2025	7 March 2026	35	15	10	10	39	32	+7	42.86	
Chapecoense	(Brazil)	30 May 2026	9 November 2026	20	4	4	12	19	40	−21	20.00	
Vitória	(Brazil)	10 November 2026	present	0	0	0	0	0	0	+0	—	
Total				281	119	80	82	342	265	+77	42.35	—

== Honours ==
=== Player ===
Ulbra

- Campeonato Gaúcho Segunda Divisão: 2003

Sapucaiense

- Campeonato Gaúcho Segunda Divisão: 2007

Joinville

- Copa Santa Catarina: 2009

Goiás

- Campeonato Brasileiro Série B: 2012

=== Coach ===
Amazonas

- Campeonato Amazonense: 2023

Vila Nova

- Campeonato Goiano: 2025
