= Alan Stence =

Brazilian footballer

Personal information
- Full name: Alan Matheus Stence
- Date of birth: 3 July 2002 (age 24)
- Place of birth: Araras, Brazil
- Height: 1.84 m (6 ft 0 in)
- Position: Attacking midfielder

Team information
- Current team: Ferroviária
- Number: 21

Youth career
- Velo Clube
- 2021: Independente de Limeira
- 2022: União São João
- 2022: Santo André
- 2022–2023: Goiás

Senior career*
Years	Team	Apps	(Gls)
2022–2026	Goiás	3	(0)
2023	→ Aparecidense (loan)	0	(0)
2023	→ Barra-SC (loan)	0	(0)
2024	→ CRAC (loan)	14	(1)
2025	→ Sampaio Corrêa (loan)	21	(2)
2026	→ São José-SP (loan)	10	(1)
2026–	Ferroviária	8	(0)
- * Club domestic league appearances and goals as of 19:38, 30 October 2026 (UTC)

Alan Matheus Stence (born 3 July 2002), known as Alan Stence or just Alan, is a Brazilian footballer who plays as an attacking midfielder for Ferroviária.

== Career ==
Born in Araras, São Paulo, Alan played for several clubs in his native state before joining Goiás' youth sides in 2022. He made his first team debut on 27 October of that year, coming on as a half-time substitute but being replaced after 28 minutes on the field in a 2–2 home draw against Real Noroeste (5–4 penalty loss), for the year's Copa Verde.

On 14 April 2023, after one further appearance, Alan was loaned to Série C side Aparecidense until the end of the season. After making no appearances, he moved to Barra-SC on 7 August, also in a temporary deal.

On 8 February 2024, Alan moved to CRAC also on loan. Back to his parent club in August, he only appeared with the under-23 squad before joining Sampaio Corrêa on loan on 27 November.

Back to Goiás in August 2025, Alan was included in the first team squad by head coach Fábio Carille, and renewed his contract until the end of 2026 on 6 November of that year. He was rarely used afterwards, however, and moved to São José-SP on loan on 9 February 2026.

== Career statistics ==
As of 30 October 2026

Club	Season	League			State League		Cup		Continental		Other		Total	
Club	Season	Division	Apps	Goals	Apps	Goals	Apps	Goals	Apps	Goals	Apps	Goals	Apps	Goals
Goiás	2022	Série A	0	0	—		—		—		1 (Note: Appearance(s) in Copa Verde)	0	1	0
Goiás	2023	Série A	—		0	0	—		—		1	0	1	0
Goiás	2025	Série B	2	0	—		—		—		—		2	0
Goiás	2026	Série B	—		1	0	—		—		—		1	0
Goiás	Total		2	0	1	0	—		—		2	0	5	0
Aparecidense (loan)	2023	Série C	0	0	—		—		—		—		0	0
Barra-SC (loan)	2023	Catarinense	—		—		—		—		5 (Note: Appearance(s) in Copa Santa Catarina)	0	5	0
CRAC (loan)	2024	Série D	12	0	2	1	—		—		—		14	1
Sampaio Corrêa (loan)	2025	Série D	12	1	9	1	—		—		7 (Note: Appearance(s) in Copa do Nordeste)	1	28	3
São José-SP (loan)	2026	Paulista A2	—		10	1	—		—		—		10	1
Ferroviária	2026	Série C	8	0	—		—		—		—		8	0
Career total			34	1	22	3	0	0	0	0	14	1	70	5

== Honours ==
Goiás

- Copa Verde: 2023
