= Francisco Barrios (footballer) =

Uruguayan footballer (born 2002)

Personal information
- Full name: Francisco Barrios Azzini
- Date of birth: 19 February 2002 (age 24)
- Place of birth: Montevideo, Uruguay
- Height: 1.81 m (5 ft 11 in)
- Position: Midfielder

Team information
- Current team: CFR Cluj
- Number: 5

Youth career
- –2021: Defensor Sporting

Senior career*
Years	Team	Apps	(Gls)
2021–2025	Defensor Sporting	64	(2)
2023	→ Boston River (loan)	14	(1)
2025	→ Atlético Goianiense (loan)	1	(0)
2025–2026	Boston River	21	(0)
2026–	CFR Cluj	2	(0)
- * Club domestic league appearances and goals as of 4 September 2026

Francisco Barrios Azzini (born 19 February 2002) is a Uruguayan professional footballer who plays as a midfielder for Liga I club CFR Cluj.

== Career statistics ==
=== Club ===
As of match played 28 October 2026

Club	Season	League			National Cup (Note: Includes Copa Uruguay, Copa do Brasil, Cupa României)		Continental		Other		Total	
Club	Season	Division	Apps	Goals	Apps	Goals	Apps	Goals	Apps	Goals	Apps	Goals
Defensor Sporting	2021	Uruguayan Segunda División	18	1	0	0	–		4 (Note: Appearances in Uruguayan Segunda División promotion play-offs)	0	22	1
Defensor Sporting	2022	Uruguayan Primera División	26	1	4	0	–		–		30	1
Defensor Sporting	2024	Uruguayan Primera División	20	0	5	0	0	0	0	0	25	0
Defensor Sporting	Total		64	2	9	0	0	0	4	0	77	3
Boston River (loan)	2023	Uruguayan Primera División	14	1	0	0	1 (Note: Appearances in Copa Libertadores)	0	–		15	1
Atlético Goianiense (loan)	2025	Campeonato Brasileiro Série B	1	0	1	0	–		2 (Note: Appearances in Campeonato Goiano)	0	4	0
Boston River	2025	Uruguayan Primera División	7	0	2	0	–		–		9	0
Boston River	2026	Uruguayan Primera División	14	0	–		5 (Note: Appearances in Copa Sudamericana)	0	–		19	0
Boston River	Total		21	0	2	0	5	0	–		28	0
CFR Cluj	2026–27	Liga I	2	0	2	0	2 (Note: Appearances in UEFA Conference League)	0	–		6	0
Career total			102	3	14	0	8	0	4	0	128	3

== Honours ==
Defensor Sporting

- Copa Uruguay: 2022, 2024
- Supercopa Uruguaya runner-up: 2024
