= Ignácio Neto =

Brazilian football manager

Personal information
- Full name: Ignácio de Loiola Alvares Nogueira Neto
- Date of birth: 25 February 1986 (age 40)
- Place of birth: Belém, Brazil

Team information
- Current team: Paysandu (head coach)

Managerial career
- Years: Team
- 2023: Tuna Luso U20
- 2024: Pedreira
- 2024: Tuna Luso U20
- 2025: Tuna Luso
- 2025: Paysandu U20
- 2025–2026: Paysandu (assistant)
- 2025: Paysandu (interim)
- 2026: Paysandu U20
- 2027–: Paysandu

Ignácio de Loiola Alvares Nogueira Neto (born 25 February 1986), known as Ignácio Neto, is a Brazilian football coach, currently the head coach of Paysandu.

== Career ==
Born in Belém, Pará, Ignácio Neto worked with futsal and led the Colégio Santa Rosa team to the ISF World Schools Championship title in 2023. In that year, he also worked as the head coach of Tuna Luso's under-20 football team, before having his first senior experience in charge of Pedreira in the Campeonato Paraense Série A3 in 2024.

Back to Tuna's under-20 side for the remainder of the year, Ignácio Neto was appointed head coach of the first team on 9 December 2024. The following 12 August, after the club's elimination from the 2025 Série D, he left.

On 18 August 2025, Ignácio Neto joined Paysandu as the methodology coordinator of the youth categories, as well as the head coach of the under-20 team. He became an assistant coach in the first team on 10 September, and on 3 November, was named interim head coach, with the side already relegated to the Série C.

Back to his assistant role for the 2026 season, Ignácio Neto returned to the under-20s in October of that year, for their Copa do Brasil Sub-20 run. On 9 November, he was announced as head coach of the main squad for the ensuing campaign.
