= Eduardo Barros =

Brazilian football coach

Personal information
- Full name: Eduardo Maciel de Barros
- Date of birth: 8 March 1985 (age 41)
- Place of birth: Campinas, Brazil
- Position: Midfielder

Team information
- Current team: Cuiabá (head coach)

Youth career
- Lousano Paulista
- Ponte Preta
- Primavera
- –2006: Ponte Preta

Senior career*
Years	Team	Apps	(Gls)
2006	União Barbarense		
2007	Primavera	1	(0)
2007	Huracán de Tres Arroyos		

Managerial career
- 2008–2012: Paulínia U20
- 2012–2014: Novorizontino U20
- 2012–2014: Novorizontino (assistant)
- 2013: Novorizontino (interim)
- 2014: Atlético Paranaense U13
- 2014–2015: Coritiba U19
- 2016: Audax (assistant)
- 2016: Oeste (assistant)
- 2017: Audax (assistant)
- 2018: Atlético Paranaense (assistant)
- 2018–2019: Athletico Paranaense U23 (assistant)
- 2019: Athletico Paranaense U19
- 2019: Athletico Paranaense (interim)
- 2020: Athletico Paranaense U23
- 2020: Athletico Paranaense (interim)
- 2021–2022: Juventude (assistant)
- 2022: Juventude (interim)
- 2022–2024: Fluminense (assistant)
- 2023–2024: Brazil (assistant)
- 2024–2025: Cruzeiro (assistant)
- 2025: Amazonas
- 2025–: Cuiabá
- * Club domestic league appearances and goals

Eduardo Maciel de Barros (born 8 March 1985) is a Brazilian football coach and former player who played as a midfielder. He is the current head coach of Cuiabá.

== Career ==
Born in Campinas, São Paulo, Barros began his career with Paulínia, working from the under-11s to the under-19s before moving to Novorizontino in 2012. He then worked at Atlético Paranaense's under-13 squad and Coritiba's under-19s before being appointed Fernando Diniz's assistant at Audax on 9 December 2015.

Barros continued to work with Diniz in the following years, being his assistant at Oeste, Audax and Atlético. In June 2018, as Diniz was sacked, Barros remained at Atlético, being named Kelly's assistant at the under-23 side. The following 8 March, however, he was appointed coach of the under-19s.

On 5 November 2019, Barros was named interim coach of the main squad in the Série A, after the departure of Tiago Nunes. His first professional match occurred the following day, a 0–0 home draw against Cruzeiro.

On 4 December 2019, Barros was confirmed as coach of the under-23s for the ensuing Campeonato Paranaense. He returned to an interim status after the dismissal of Dorival Júnior, but was released by the club on 22 October 2020.

On 4 February 2021, Barros was named Marquinhos Santos' assistant at Juventude, newly promoted to the top tier. In 2022, he rejoined Diniz's staff at Fluminense, and subsequently worked as his assistant at the Brazil national team and Cruzeiro.

On 23 February 2025, Barros became the head coach of Série B side Amazonas. Despite winning the year's Campeonato Amazonense, he was sacked on 19 April, after two losses in the first three league matches of the season.

On 11 August 2025, Barros replaced Guto Ferreira at the helm of Cuiabá also in the second division.

== Honours ==
Amazonas

- Campeonato Amazonense: 2025
