= Agremiação Esportiva Canedense =

Brazilian football club

Canedense
- Full name: Agremiação Esportiva Canedense
- Nickname: Lobo do cerrado
- Founded: June 15, 2005
- Ground: Estádio Plínio José de Souza, Senador Canedo, Goiás state, Brazil
- Capacity: 3,000
- President: Marco Antônio Caldas Junior
Home colours	Away colours

Agremiação Esportiva Canedense, commonly known as Canedense, is a Brazilian football club based in Senador Canedo, Goiás state, where it competes at in the Campeonato Goiano, the Goiás state league.

== History ==
The club was founded on June 15, 2005. They competed in the top division of Campeonato Goiano in 2007 and 2008, were relegated to the second division in 2009, returned to the top division in 2010, but fell to the third division by 2012. They have been in the third division, or playing local football, since.

== Stadium ==
Agremiação Esportiva Canedense play their home games at Estádio Plínio José de Souza. The stadium has a maximum capacity of 3,000 people.
