= Marcondes (footballer) =

Brazilian footballer (born 1993)

Personal information
- Full name: Marcondes de Jesus Santos Junior
- Date of birth: 3 March 1993 (age 33)
- Place of birth: Foz do Iguaçu, Brazil
- Height: 1.84 m (6 ft 0 in)
- Position: Centre-back

Team information
- Current team: [[[Amazonas Futebol Clube|Amazonas]]

Youth career
- –2012: Londrina

Senior career*
Years	Team	Apps	(Gls)
2012–2021	Londrina	129	(4)
2012	→ Iraty (loan)	12	(0)
2018	→ XV de Piracicaba (loan)	10	(0)
2022–2023	Água Santa	16	(0)
2022	→ Tombense (loan)	14	(1)
2023	→ Vila Nova (loan)	7	(0)
2024–2025	Vila Nova	3	(0)
2026–	Amazonas	11	(0)
- * Club domestic league appearances and goals as of 10 November 2026

Marcondes de Jesus Santos Junior (born 3 March 1993), simply known as Marcondes, is a Brazilian professional footballer who plays as a centre-back for Amazonas.

== Career ==
Revealed in Londrina EC youth categories in 2012, Marcondes played for the club during the campaign of the Primeira Liga and two state titles, making 129 appearances and scoring 4 goals for the club. In 2022 he signed with Água Santa, where in the following season he was runner-up in São Paulo, being one of the team's highlights. Loaned to Vila Nova for the 2023 Campeonato Brasileiro Série B dispute, he suffered a serious knee injury, only returning to play in 2024.

== Honours ==
Londrina

- Primeira Liga: 2017
- Campeonato Paranaense: 2014, 2021
