= Vinícius Bergantin =

Brazilian footballer (born 1980)

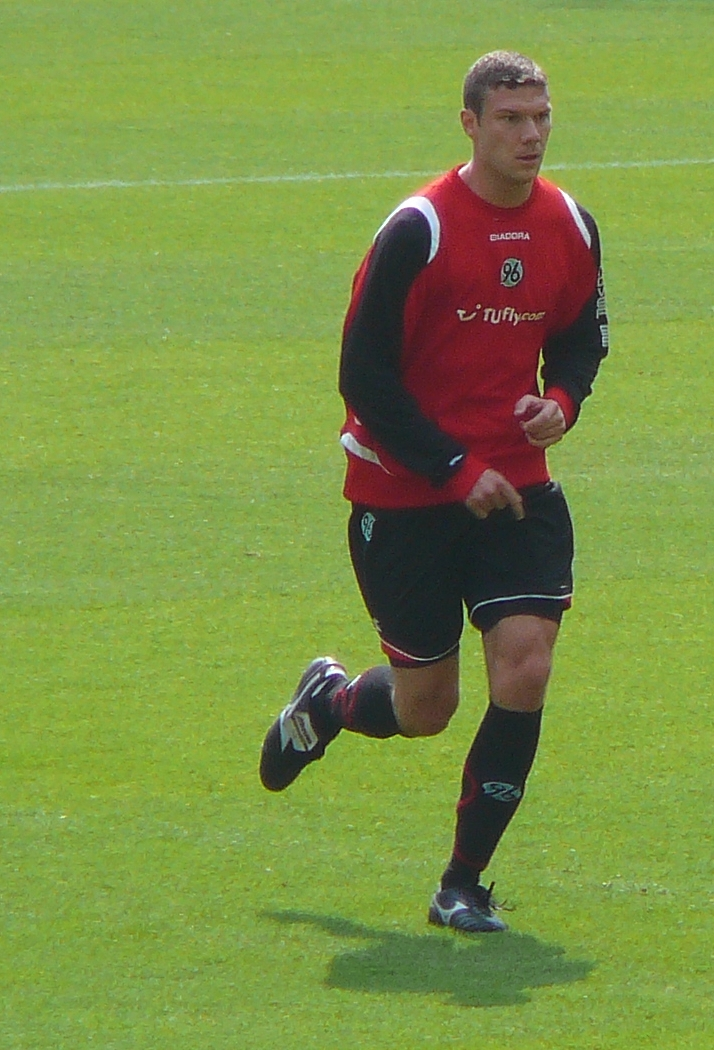
- Bergantin training with Hannover 96 in 2008

Personal information
- Full name: Vinícius Bergantin
- Date of birth: 31 July 1980 (age 46)
- Place of birth: Salto, Brazil
- Height: 1.89 m (6 ft 2 in)
- Position: Centre-back

Team information
- Current team: Chapecoense (head coach)

Youth career
- 1993–2000: Ituano

Senior career*
Years	Team	Apps	(Gls)
2000–2003	Ituano	24	(3)
2001	→ São Caetano (loan)	2	(1)
2002	→ Gama (loan)	19	(0)
2002–2003	→ Hannover 96 (loan)	17	(2)
2003–2010	Hannover 96	144	(9)
2011	Americana	2	(0)

Managerial career
- 2017: Ituano (assistant)
- 2017–2021: Ituano
- 2021–2022: Inter de Limeira
- 2022–2023: Santo André
- 2023: CSA
- 2023–2024: Retrô
- 2024: Ferroviária
- 2024–2025: Flamengo (assistant)
- 2025: Ferroviária
- 2025: Avaí
- 2026: Cruzeiro (assistant)
- 2026: São Bernardo
- 2026–: Chapecoense
- * Club domestic league appearances and goals

Vinícius Bergantin (born 31 July 1980) is a Brazilian professional football coach and former player. He is currently the coach of Chapecoense.

A central defender, Bergantin began his career with Ituano, but spent most of his playing career with Hannover 96.

== Playing career ==
Vinícius was born in Salto. He began his career at the academy of Ituano Futebol Clube in 1998 and signed a professional deal at the club in 2000 after impressing the coaching staff there. His first and only season at the club was very successful, as he impressed many with his ability to make forward runs and finished the season with three league goals in twenty-four appearances. This good form attracted the interest of other clubs, including Associação Desportiva São Caetano, who signed him in 2001.

However Vinícius rarely featured for São Caetano, making just two league appearances and scoring once. In 2002, he was signed by Sociedade Gama. Here he regularly made appearances for the club, taking part in nineteen games in the league without scoring. He was showing a lot of potential and European clubs began to show an interest.

Gama agreed to loan Vinícius out to German Bundesliga outfit Hannover 96 for the 2002–03 season. He made seventeen appearances, scoring twice during this loan spell and impressed the manager at the time. Hannover signed Vinícius for £700,000 in 2003. Vinícius had a spinal disc herniation and so he could not play from 2008 to 2010. Hannover 96 did not extend his contract because of his injury, but he remained at the club to keep in shape.

Three months after being without a club following his departure from Hannover, he joined the Americana Futebol in January 2011.

== Coaching career ==
After his retirement, Bergantin started working as an assistant manager in his first club Ituano in 2017, being appointed manager later in the same year. He resigned from Ituano on 6 June 2021, after nearly four years in charge of the club.

Bergantin subsequently worked at Inter de Limeira and Santo André in his native state, before being named head coach of CSA on 21 February 2023. He was sacked by the latter club on 21 June.

On 30 January 2024, after a short period at Retrô, Bergantin was appointed in charge of Ferroviária. He left the club to join Tite's staff at Flamengo on 20 July.

Bergantin returned to AFE on 17 February 2025, with the club now in division two. He was sacked on 17 September, after four winless matches, and took over fellow league team Avaí seven days later.

Bergantin left Avaí on 28 November 2025, after refusing a renewal offer to return to work with Tite, being his assistant at Cruzeiro. On 30 July 2026, he returned to head coaching duties after being named at the helm of São Bernardo also in division two.

On 13 November 2026, Bergantin was announced as Chapecoense's fourth head coach of the season, with the club already relegated from the Série A.

== Managerial statistics ==
As of 21 September 2025.

Managerial record by team and tenure
Team	Nat.	From	To	Record								Ref
Team	Nat.	From	To	G	W	D	L	GF	GA	GD	Win %	Ref
Ituano	(Brazil)	21 July 2017	6 June 2021	115	43	27	45	151	136	+15	37.39	
Inter de Limeira	(Brazil)	17 September 2021	30 March 2022	14	3	6	5	15	20	−5	21.43	
Santo André	(Brazil)	5 October 2022	21 February 2023	10	4	2	4	8	10	−2	40.00	
CSA	(Brazil)	21 February 2023	21 June 2023	21	8	8	5	22	16	+6	38.10	
Retrô	(Brazil)	11 September 2023	23 January 2024	6	3	1	2	13	8	+5	50.00	
Ferroviária	(Brazil)	30 January 2024	20 July 2024	26	12	13	1	26	12	+14	46.15	
Ferroviária	(Brazil)	17 February 2025	17 September 2025	32	10	11	11	35	37	−2	31.25	
Avaí	(Brazil)	24 September 2025	28 November 2025	10	4	4	2	14	10	+4	40.00	
São Bernardo	(Brazil)	30 July 2026	13 November 2026	18	7	5	6	26	21	+5	38.89	
Chapecoense	(Brazil)	13 November 2026	present	0	0	0	0	0	0	+0	—	
Career total				252	94	77	81	310	270	+40	37.30	—
