= Banpará =

Banco do Estado do Pará S.A.
- Formerly: Banco do Estado do Pará (1959-1979)
- Company type: Sociedade Anônima
- Traded as: B3: BPAR3
- Industry: Banking, Financial services
- Founded: 30 November 1959; 66 years ago
- Headquarters: Belém, Brazil
- Area served: Pará
- Key people: Ruth Mello (CEO)
- Products: Investment banking Retail Banking; Credit cards
- Revenue: ▲ R$ 2.053 billion (2021)
- Net income: ▼ R$ 241.28 million (2021)
- Total assets: R$ 12.52 billion (2021)
- Website: www.banpara.b.br

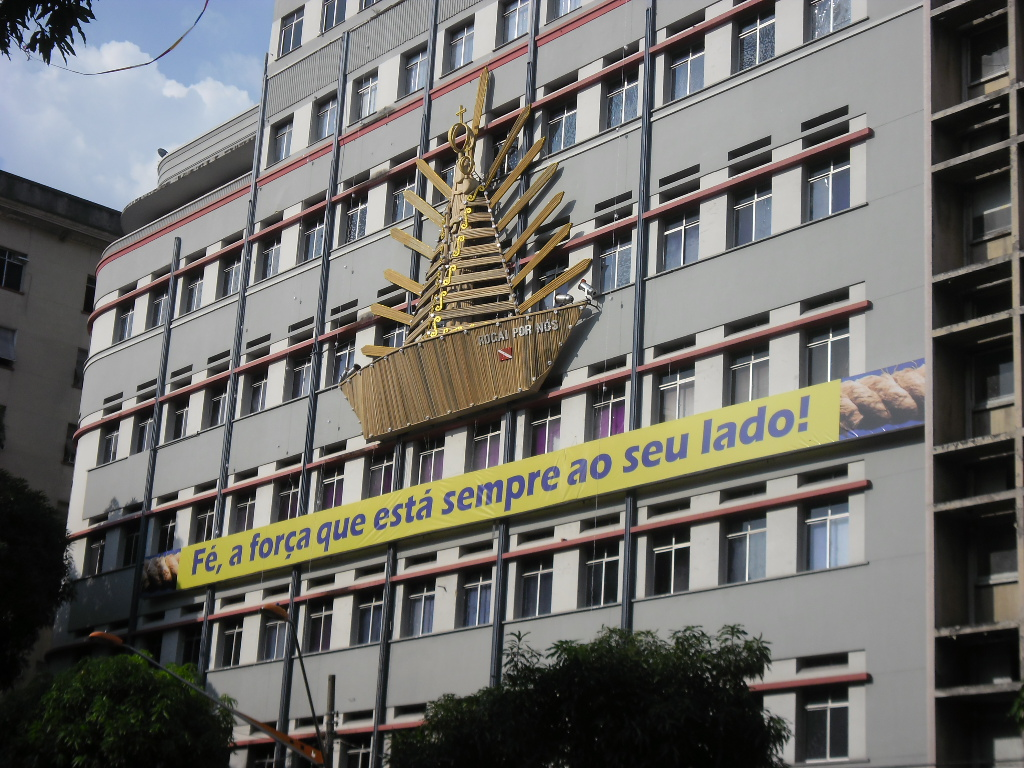
Banpará headquarters building.

Banpará is a Brazilian regional bank, founded in 1959 by the Pará state government. Its primary activity is supporting the banking needs of the state government and its employees’.

== Controversies ==
The bank was the centerpoint of a 1984 scandal which saw over 10 million dollars siphoned away from its coffers into bank accounts controlled by the then-governor, Jader Barbalho, and his associates. The accusation involved the CEO, a political ally of Barbalho, and the financial director, both banned from working in the financial sector for 10 and 3 years, respectively.
