= Associação Ferroviária de Esportes =

Ferroviária
- Full name: Associação Ferroviária de Esportes
- Nicknames: AFE; Ferrinha; Locomotiva (Locomotive)
- Founded: 12 April 1950 (76 years ago)
- Ground: Fonte Luminosa
- Capacity: 25,000
- Chairman: Filippo Duarte Bertolucci
- Head coach: Rogério Corrêa
- League: Campeonato Brasileiro Série C Campeonato Paulista Série A2
- 2025 2025: Série B, 17th of 20 (relegated); Paulista Série A2, 5th of 16
- Website: ferroviariasa.com.br
Home colours	Away colours

Associação Ferroviária de Esportes, commonly referred to as simply Ferroviária, is a Brazilian association football club in Araraquara, São Paulo. They currently play in the Série B, the second tier of Brazilian football, as well as in the Campeonato Paulista A1, the top tier of the São Paulo state league.

Founded on April 12, 1950, Ferroviária is the only Araraquara club to reach the Campeonato Paulista first division. The club's best campaign in that competition was in 1959, when it finished in the third position. It is also the only club of the city to have competed in the Campeonato Brasileiro Série B. The club competed in this competition in 1995.

They play in carmine shirts, white shorts and socks.

== History ==
The club was founded on April 12, 1950, by engineers of Estrada de Ferro Araraquara (meaning Araraquara Railroad). Antônio Tavares Pereira Lima was chosen as the club's first president. Initially the club's colors were to be blue and white, like the Rio de Janeiro city team. However, these colors were not very popular, and were changed to carmine and white, like the Juventus ones.

On May 13, 1951, the club played their first match ever, beating Mogiana of Campinas 3–1. The club's first goal was scored by Fordinho in that match. On May 20, 1951, the club played their second match, in Taquaritinga city. It was also the club's first defeat. Linense, of Lins, beat Ferroviária 2–1. On June 10, 1951, Ferroviária's stadium, called Estádio Fonte Luminosa, was inaugurated. In the inaugural match, Vasco da Gama, of Rio de Janeiro, beat Ferroviária 5–0. On July 1, 1951, Ferroviária played their first match against a club from the same city. Ferroviária was defeated by Paulista (Araraquara) 4–0.

On April 15, 1956, Ferroviária beat Botafogo of Ribeirão Preto 6–3 in the Campeonato Paulista Second Division final stage (disputed by eight teams playing against each other twice), and won the title and the promotion to the following year's first division. In the last match of the competition, Ferroviária beat Portuguesa Santista 5–4.

In 1983, Ferroviária competed in the Brazilian Série A, finishing in the 12th position. In 1994, the club was the runner-up of the Brazilian Série C, after losing to Novorizontino 1–0 in the first leg, at home, and 5–0 in the second leg, in Novo Horizonte. The club was promoted to the following year's second division.

From 1994 until 1996, the Ferroviária participated in the top division of São Paulo state championship, having Otavio Augusto (Otavio Braga) as their top scorer in 1994 with 8 goals and in 1996 with 6 goals.

== Players ==
=== First team squad ===
As of 20 August 2026

Note: Flags indicate national team as defined under FIFA eligibility rules; some limited exceptions apply. Players may hold more than one non-FIFA nationality.

No.	Pos.	Nation	Player
2	DF	BRA	Lucas Rodrigues
3	DF	BRA	Erik
4	DF	BRA	Guilherme Ferreira (on loan from Londrina)
5	MF	BRA	Ricardinho (captain)
6	DF	BRA	Rhuan
7	FW	BRA	Fábio Soares
8	MF	BRA	Alencar
9	FW	BRA	Denilson Silva (on loan from Rio Claro)
10	MF	BRA	Albano
11	FW	BRA	Vitor Barreto
12	GK	BRA	Fábio Rampi
13	DF	BRA	Gustavo Medina
14	MF	BRA	Jhonatan Garcia
15	MF	BRA	Fernandinho (on loan from Nova Iguaçu)
16	MF	BRA	Vinícius Meireles
18	MF	BRA	Rafael Carrilho
19	FW	BRA	Thiago
20	MF	BRA	David Souza

No.	Pos.	Nation	Player
21	MF	BRA	Alan Stence
22	DF	BRA	Felipe Rodrigues
23	MF	BRA	Arthur Schilling
24	GK	BRA	Igor
26	DF	BRA	Vinicius Kauê
27	MF	BRA	Igor Henrique
28	FW	BRA	Denilson Chaves
29	DF	BRA	Eduardo Oliveira
30	MF	BRA	Raoni
31	GK	BRA	Denis Júnior
33	FW	BRA	Pedro Estevam
34	GK	BRA	Gustavo Jundi
36	FW	BRA	Douglas Skilo
39	DF	BRA	Gadu
40	DF	BRA	Zé Vitor
44	DF	BRA	Carlão
77	MF	BRA	Juninho
99	FW	BRA	Maranhão (on loan from Guarani)

=== Youth players ===
Note: Flags indicate national team as defined under FIFA eligibility rules; some limited exceptions apply. Players may hold more than one non-FIFA nationality.

No.	Pos.	Nation	Player
41	DF	BRA	Mateus Ortega
42	MF	BRA	Pedro Barros

No.	Pos.	Nation	Player
43	DF	BRA	João Victor

=== Out on loan ===
Note: Flags indicate national team as defined under FIFA eligibility rules; some limited exceptions apply. Players may hold more than one non-FIFA nationality.

No.	Pos.	Nation	Player
—	DF	BRA	Vinícius Silva (at Houston Dynamo 2 until 31 December 2026)
—	DF	BRA	Edson Lucas (at Sport Recife until 30 November 2026)

No.	Pos.	Nation	Player
—	FW	BRA	Luis Henrique (at Sousa until 30 September 2026)

=== First-team staff ===
As of 7 December 2024

Position	Name
Head coach	(Brazil) Rogério Corrêa
Assistant coach	(Brazil) Vitor Fortes
Fitness coach	(Brazil) Fábio Jacobasso
Goalkeeper coach	(Brazil) Emerson Marinho

== Honours ==
=== Official tournaments ===
State
Competitions	Titles	Seasons
Copa Paulista	2	2006, 2017

=== Others tournaments ===
==== State ====
- Torneio Incentivo (2): 1977, 1982
- Campeonato Paulista Série A2 (3): 1955, 1966, 2015

=== Runners-up ===
- Campeonato Brasileiro Série C (2): 1994, 2026
- Campeonato Brasileiro Série D (1): 2023
- Copa Paulista (2): 2016, 2018
- Campeonato Paulista Série A2 (3): 1952, 1953, 2026
- Campeonato Paulista Série A3 (1): 2010
- Campeonato Paulista Série A4 (1): 2004

== Stadium ==
Ferroviária plays their matches at Estádio Fonte Luminosa, inaugurated in 1951, with a maximum capacity of 18,453 people.

== Mascot ==
The club's mascot is a locomotive.

== Women's team ==
The women's team won the 2014 Campeonato Brasileiro de Futebol Feminino as well as the 2014 Copa do Brasil de Futebol Feminino.

== See also ==
- Associação Ferroviária de Esportes (women)
