= Amazonas Futebol Clube =

Brazilian association football club

Amazonas
- Full name: Amazonas Futebol Clube
- Nickname: Onça-Pintada (Jaguar)
- Founded: 23 May 2019; 7 years ago
- Ground: Estádio Municipal Carlos Zamith; Arena da Amazônia
- Capacity: 10,000 (Estádio Carlos Zamith); 45.000 (Arena da Amazônia)
- President: Wesley Couto
- Head coach: Aderbal Lana
- League: Campeonato Brasileiro Série C Campeonato Amazonense
- 2025 2025: Série B, 18th of 20 (relegated); Amazonense, 1st of 8 (champions)
- Website: amazonasfc.com.br
Home colors	Away colors

Amazonas Futebol Clube, commonly referred to as Amazonas, is a Brazilian professional club based in Manaus, Amazonas founded on 23 May 2019. It competes in the Campeonato Brasileiro Série C, the third tier of Brazilian football, as well as in the Campeonato Amazonense, the top flight of the Amazonas state football league.

The club was founded in 2019 by former members from the administrations of other Manaus clubs with the objective of organizing a competitive club and revitalize football in the state of Amazonas. Despite its recent founding, the club has been successful, winning a Campeonato Amazonense in 2023, and the Campeonato Brasileiro Série C in the same year, the first national title by a club from the Amazonas state.

The club plays at Estádio Municipal Carlos Zamith, but for larger games it uses the Arena da Amazônia, one of the 2014 FIFA World Cup stadium.

Amazonas is the best ranked team from Amazonas State in CBF's national club ranking.

== History ==
Amazonas Futebol Clube was first idealized in 2017 and officially founded on 23 May 2019. The founding of the club was headed by businessman Wesley Couto — who heads the club as president — William Abreu, former football director of Atlético Rio Negro Clube, and Roberto Peggy, former president of Nacional Futebol Clube, both of which are traditional clubs from Manaus. The objective was organizing a competitive club and revitalizing football in the state of Amazonas.

Amazonas FC played their first professional tournament, the Campeonato Amazonense Série B (second division), nearly six months later. They won the tournament after defeating São Raimundo in the final.

In their first Campeonato Amazonense, Amazonas FC were knocked out in the first phase. In 2021, after Manaus FC reached the finals, the club qualified to the 2022 Campeonato Brasileiro Série D for the first time in their history, after being the best-placed team in the first phase. On 28 August 2022, Amazonas achieved a first-ever promotion to the 2023 Campeonato Brasileiro Série C, after defeating Portuguesa-RJ in the quarterfinals.

After their promotion one year before, Amazonas beat Botafogo-PB 2–0 and won the club's first ever promotion to the 2024 Campeonato Brasileiro Série B. On 22 October 2023, Amazonas became champions of Campeonato Brasileiro Série C, the first national title for a team from the state of Amazonas.

== Kit and sponsorship ==
Period	Kit manufacturer	Main shirt sponsor
2019	JLobo	e-Cali Distribuidora de Petróleo
2020	JLobo	Shopping Via Norte
2021	Super Bolla	Mineiração Samaúma
2022	Onça (In-House)	Andrelino Barreto Incorporadora
2022	SJ Sports	Andrelino Barreto Incorporadora
2023	Onça (In-House)	Governo do Estado do Amazonas
2024	Onça (In-House)	Reals Bet
2025	Onça (In-House)	none

== Honours ==
=== Official tournaments ===
National
Competitions	Titles	Seasons
Campeonato Brasileiro Série C	1	2023
State
Competitions	Titles	Seasons
Campeonato Amazonense	2	2023, 2025
Campeonato Amazonense Second Division	1	2019

=== Others tournaments ===
==== State ====
- Taça Rio Solimões (3): 2024, 2025, 2026

=== Runners-up ===
- Campeonato Amazonense (2): 2024, 2026

== Players ==
=== Current squad ===
As of 26 August 2026

Note: Flags indicate national team as defined under FIFA eligibility rules; some limited exceptions apply. Players may hold more than one non-FIFA nationality.

No.	Pos.	Nation	Player
—	GK	BRA	João Lopes
—	GK	BRA	Renan (captain)
—	GK	BRA	Victor Lube
—	GK	BRA	Axel Lopes
—	DF	BRA	Joílson
—	DF	BRA	Bruno Ramires
—	DF	BRA	Marcondes
—	DF	BRA	Diego Ivo
—	DF	BRA	Bryan
—	DF	BRA	Rafael Furlan
—	DF	BRA	Ítalo Silva
—	DF	BRA	Alyson
—	DF	BRA	Kauan Vitor
—	DF	BRA	Cicinho
—	DF	BRA	Iury
—	DF	BRA	Raylison
—	DF	BRA	Iverton
—	MF	BRA	Jhonny Lucas
—	MF	BRA	Phillipe Guimarães

No.	Pos.	Nation	Player
—	MF	BRA	Riquelme
—	MF	BRA	Fabinho
—	MF	BRA	Pablo
—	MF	BRA	Cauê Araújo
—	MF	BRA	Tonhão
—	MF	COL	Yaider Mena
—	MF	BRA	Felipe Pelles
—	MF	BRA	Júlio Simas
—	MF	BRA	Guga
—	MF	BRA	Guilherme Brito
—	FW	USA	Adrien Graffin
—	FW	BRA	Ronan
—	FW	BRA	Kauê Fernandes
—	FW	BRA	Geuvânio
—	FW	BRA	Vinícius Leite
—	FW	BRA	Ronaldo
—	FW	BRA	Bernardo Daciolo
—	FW	BRA	Ezequiel

=== Out on loan ===
Note: Flags indicate national team as defined under FIFA eligibility rules; some limited exceptions apply. Players may hold more than one non-FIFA nationality.

No. / Pos. / Nation / Player	No. / Pos. / Nation / Player

== Rivalries ==
Amazonas was created to rival Manaus FC, when it took advantage of the low moment of the most traditional clubs in the state to establish itself, attracting municipal and state political interest. In 2023, the two clubs received investments from the city of Manaus and the state government, generating discontent in other more traditional clubs in the state, such as Nacional, Rio Negro and São Raimundo.
