= 2024 Campeonato Brasileiro Série C =

Campeonato Brasileiro Série C
- Season: 2024
- Dates: 20 April – 19 October
- Champions: Volta Redonda (1st title)
- Promoted: Athletic; Ferroviária; Remo; Volta Redonda
- Relegated: Aparecidense; Ferroviário; Sampaio Corrêa; São José
- Matches: 216
- Goals: 522 (2.42 per match)
- Top goalscorer: Kayke; Paulo Sérgio (10 goals each)
- Biggest home win: São Bernardo 5–0 Ferroviário; Group A, R3, 6 May
- Biggest away win: CSA 0–5 Athletic; Group A, R4, 12 May
- Highest scoring: 7 goals Botafogo-PB 4–3 Aparecidense; Group A, R11, 3 July
- Longest winning run: 5 games Athletic; Botafogo-PB
- Longest unbeaten run: 18 games Ferroviária
- Longest winless run: 12 games São José
- Longest losing run: 7 games Floresta

The 2024 Campeonato Brasileiro Série C was a football competition held in Brazil, equivalent to the third division. It began on 20 April and ended on 19 October 2024.

Twenty teams competed in the tournament, twelve returning from the 2023 season, four promoted from the 2023 Campeonato Brasileiro Série D (Athletic, Caxias, Ferroviária and Ferroviário) and four relegated from the 2023 Campeonato Brasileiro Série B (ABC, Londrina, Sampaio Corrêa and Tombense).

Athletic, Ferroviária, Remo and Volta Redonda were promoted to the 2025 Campeonato Brasileiro Série B, while Aparecidense, Ferroviário, Sampaio Corrêa, and São José were relegated to the 2025 Campeonato Brasileiro Série D.

In the finals, Volta Redonda won their first title after defeating Athletic 3–0 on aggregate.

== Format ==
The first stage had one group where each team played the other teams in a single round-robin tournament. The top eight teams advanced to the second stage, while the bottom four were relegated. In the second stage, the teams were divided into two groups of four teams each. Each group was played on a home-and-away round-robin basis. The top two teams of each group were promoted to the Série B, while the group winners advanced to the finals.

== Teams ==
Location of teams in 2024 Série C

Pos.	Relegated from 2023 Série B
17th	Sampaio Corrêa
18th	Tombense
19th	Londrina
20th	ABC

Pos.	Promoted from 2023 Série D
1st	Ferroviário
2nd	Ferroviária
3rd	Athletic
4th	Caxias

=== Number of teams by state ===
Number of teams	State	Team(s)
3	Rio Grande do Sul	Caxias, São José and Ypiranga
2	Ceará	Ferroviário and Floresta
2	Minas Gerais	Athletic and Tombense
2	São Paulo	Ferroviária and São Bernardo
1	Alagoas	CSA
1	Goiás	Aparecidense
1	Maranhão	Sampaio Corrêa
1	Pará	Remo
1	Paraná	Londrina
1	Paraíba	Botafogo-PB
1	Pernambuco	Náutico
1	Rio de Janeiro	Volta Redonda
1	Rio Grande do Norte	ABC
1	Santa Catarina	Figueirense
1	Sergipe	Confiança

=== Stadiums and locations ===
Team	Home city	State	Stadium	Capacity
ABC	Natal	Rio Grande do Norte	Frasqueirão	18,000
Aparecidense	Aparecida de Goiânia	Goiás	Annibal Batista de Toledo	6,645
Athletic	São João del-Rei	Minas Gerais	Arena Sicredi	6,000
Botafogo-PB	João Pessoa	Paraíba	Almeidão	25,770
Caxias	Caxias do Sul	Rio Grande do Sul	Centenário	22,132
Confiança	Aracaju	Sergipe	Batistão	15,575
CSA	Maceió	Alagoas	Rei Pelé	17,126
Ferroviária	Araraquara	São Paulo	Fonte Luminosa	20,000
Ferroviário	Fortaleza	Ceará	Presidente Vargas	20,262
Figueirense	Florianópolis	Santa Catarina	Orlando Scarpelli	19,584
Floresta	Fortaleza	Ceará	Presidente Vargas	20,262
Londrina	Londrina	Paraná	Estádio do Café	31,000
Náutico	Recife	Pernambuco	Aflitos	22,856
Remo	Belém	Pará	Baenão	13,792
Sampaio Corrêa	São Luís	Maranhão	Nhozinho Santos	11,429
São Bernardo	São Bernardo do Campo	São Paulo	1º de Maio	15,159
São José	Porto Alegre	Rio Grande do Sul	Passo D'Areia	15,000
Tombense	Tombos	Minas Gerais	Almeidão	3,050
Volta Redonda	Volta Redonda	Rio de Janeiro	Raulino de Oliveira	20,255
Ypiranga	Erechim	Rio Grande do Sul	Colosso da Lagoa	22,000

== Personnel and kits ==
Team	Head coach	Captain	Kit manufacturer	Kit main sponsor
ABC	(Brazil) Roberto Fonseca	(Brazil) Richardson	Elefante MQ (club manufactured kit)	Esportes da Sorte
Aparecidense	(Brazil) Emerson Ávila	(Brazil) Guilherme Nunes	Super Bolla	BETesporte, Arroz Cristal
Athletic	(Brazil) Roger Silva	(Brazil) Diego Fumaça	KickBall	Bet7k, Connect@, São João del-Rei
Botafogo-PB	(Brazil) Evaristo Piza	(Brazil) Dalton	LWGA Company	Betnacional, Game Arena
Caxias	(Brazil) Thiago Gomes	(Brazil) Dirceu	Bravo35	Banrisul, Postos SIM, R Dimer Construtora
Confiança	(Brazil) Mazola Júnior	(Brazil) Robson	Super Bolla	Banese Card
CSA	(Brazil) Higo Magalhães	(Brazil) Tiago Marques	Azulão (club manufactured kit)	Governo de Alagoas, Carajás Home Center
Ferroviária	(Brazil) Júnior Rocha	(Brazil) Saulo	Lupo Sport	Betnacional
Ferroviário	(Brazil) Raimundo Wágner (caretaker)	(Brazil) Ciel	T33 (club manufactured kit)	Zenir, ABRO, Grupo Servnac
Figueirense	(Brazil) João Burse	(Brazil) Genílson	Volt Sport	Aposta Ganha, Grupo Liderança, Dalla Cervejaria
Floresta	(Brazil) Marcelo Cabo	(Brazil) Marcelo	Golaço	
Londrina	(Brazil) Claudinei Oliveira	(Brazil) Rafael Longuine	Karilu	AgroPlay
Náutico	(Brazil) Bruno Pivetti	(Brazil) Sousa	Diadora	Esportes da Sorte
Remo	(Brazil) Rodrigo Santana	(Brazil) Bruno Silva	Volt Sport	Banpará, Betnacional
Sampaio Corrêa	(Brazil) Felipe Surian	(Brazil) Ferreira	Finta	Só Saúde Resgate, PAGBET, Lojas Noroeste
São Bernardo	(Brazil) Ricardo Catalá	(Brazil) Alex Alves	Magnum (club manufactured kit)	Magnum Bank
São José	(Brazil) Rogério Zimmermann	(Brazil) Fábio Rampi	Weefe	Banrisul
Tombense	(Brazil) Raul Cabral	(Brazil) Roger Carvalho	Vettor	
Volta Redonda	(Brazil) Rogério Corrêa	(Brazil) Bruno Barra	Pratic Sport	BetSpeed, CSN Cimentos
Ypiranga	(Brazil) Thiago Carvalho	(Brazil) Anderson Uchôa	Clanel	Banrisul, Aurora, Cavaletti

=== Coaching changes ===
Team	Outgoing head coach	Manner of departure	Date of vacancy	Position in table	Incoming head coach	Date of appointment	Ref
Náutico	(Brazil) Bruno Pivetti	Mutual agreement	28 August 2023	Pre-season	(Brazil) Allan Aal	15 November 2023	
Floresta	(Brazil) Matheus Costa	End of contract	4 September 2023	Pre-season	(Brazil) Felipe Surian	16 October 2023	
Confiança	(Brazil) Luizinho Vieira	Signed by Amazonas (Note: Signed during the 2023 season, but Confiança's calendar had already ended.)	11 September 2023	Pre-season	(Brazil) Paulo Massaro	8 November 2023	
Ferroviário	(Brazil) Paulinho Kobayashi	Resigned	18 September 2023	Pre-season	(Brazil) Matheus Costa	22 September 2023	
Athletic	(Brazil) Cícero Júnior	End of contract	21 September 2023	Pre-season	(Brazil) Rodrigo Santana	9 December 2023	
CSA	(Brazil) Marcelo Cabo	End of contract	22 September 2023	Pre-season	(Brazil) Rogério Corrêa	13 October 2023	
Botafogo-PB	(Brazil) Felipe Surian	End of contract	10 October 2023	Pre-season	(Brazil) Cristian de Souza	1 November 2023	
Volta Redonda	(Brazil) Rogério Corrêa	End of contract	10 October 2023	Pre-season	(Brazil) Felipe Loureiro	23 October 2023	
Figueirense	(Brazil) Paulo Baier	End of contract	30 October 2023	Pre-season	(Brazil) João Burse	28 November 2023	
ABC	(Brazil) Jonydei Tostão	End of caretaker spell	25 November 2023	Pre-season	(Brazil) Rafael Lacerda	22 November 2023	
Londrina	(Brazil) Roberto Fonseca Júnior	End of caretaker spell	25 November 2023	Pre-season	(Brazil) Emerson Ávila	27 December 2023	
Sampaio Corrêa	(Brazil) Dejair Ferreira	End of caretaker spell	25 November 2023	Pre-season	(Brazil) Thiago Gomes	11 December 2023	
Tombense	(Brazil) Moacir Júnior	End of contract	30 November 2023	Pre-season	(Brazil) Raul Cabral	30 November 2023	
São José	(Brazil) Thiago Gomes	Resigned	1 December 2023	Pre-season	(Brazil) China Balbino	5 December 2023	
Aparecidense	(Brazil) Hemerson Maria	End of contract	2 December 2023	Pre-season	(Brazil) Rodrigo Limiro	2 December 2023	
Ferroviário	(Brazil) Matheus Costa	Sacked	21 January 2024	State leagues	(Brazil) Raimundo Wágner (caretaker)	24 January 2024	
CSA	(Brazil) Rogério Corrêa	Sacked	22 January 2024	State leagues	(Brazil) Marcelo Cabo	22 January 2024	
Ferroviária	(Brazil) Alexandre Lopes	Sacked	29 January 2024	State leagues	(Brazil) Vinícius Bergantin (Note: Gabriel Remedio was the caretaker head coach in a Campeonato Paulista Série A2 match against XV de Piracicaba on 31 January.)	30 January 2024	
Ferroviário	(Brazil) Raimundo Wágner	End of caretaker spell	31 January 2024	State leagues	(Brazil) Maurício Copertino	31 January 2024	
Ypiranga	(Brazil) Jerson Testoni	Sacked	5 February 2024	State leagues	(Brazil) Thiago Carvalho	5 February 2024	
Aparecidense	(Brazil) Rodrigo Limiro	Sacked	8 February 2024	State leagues	(Brazil) Lúcio Flávio	9 February 2024	
Volta Redonda	(Brazil) Felipe Loureiro	Sacked	15 February 2024	State leagues	(Brazil) Rogério Corrêa	16 February 2024	
Caxias	(Brazil) Gerson Gusmão	Sacked	16 February 2024	State leagues	(Brazil) Argel Fuchs	16 February 2024	
Botafogo-PB	(Brazil) Cristian de Souza	Mutual agreement	28 February 2024	State leagues	(Brazil) Moacir Júnior	1 March 2024	
Remo	(Brazil) Ricardo Catalá	Sacked	28 February 2024	State leagues	(Paraguay) Gustavo Morínigo	4 March 2024	
Confiança	(Brazil) Paulo Massaro	Mutual agreement	29 February 2024	State leagues	(Brazil) Neto Pereira (caretaker)	1 March 2024	
CSA	(Brazil) Marcelo Cabo	Sacked	3 March 2024	State leagues	(Brazil) Bebeto Moraes (caretaker)	4 March 2024	
Athletic	(Brazil) Rodrigo Santana	Mutual agreement	5 March 2024	State leagues	(Brazil) Roger Silva	5 March 2024	
Confiança	(Brazil) Neto Pereira	End of caretaker spell	8 March 2024	State leagues	(Brazil) Gerson Gusmão	8 March 2024	
ABC	(Brazil) Rafael Lacerda	Mutual agreement	10 March 2024	State leagues	(Brazil) Marcelo Cabo	10 March 2024	
CSA	(Brazil) Bebeto Moraes	End of caretaker spell	15 March 2024	State leagues	(Brazil) Cristian de Souza	15 March 2024	
Náutico	(Brazil) Allan Aal	Sacked	30 March 2024	State leagues	(Brazil) Mazola Júnior	2 April 2024	
São Bernardo	(Brazil) Márcio Zanardi	Signed by Goiás	31 March 2024	State leagues	(Brazil) Ricardo Catalá	3 April 2024	
Botafogo-PB	(Brazil) Moacir Júnior	Sacked	15 April 2024	State leagues	(Brazil) Evaristo Piza (Note: Marco Antônio was the caretaker head coach in the 1st round match against Floresta on 21 April.)	15 April 2024	
ABC	(Brazil) Marcelo Cabo	Sacked	27 April 2024	14th	(Brazil) Roberto Fonseca	29 April 2024	
São José	(Brazil) China Balbino	Mutual agreement	30 April 2024	19th	(Brazil) Pingo	1 May 2024	
Floresta	(Brazil) Felipe Surian	Mutual agreement	5 May 2024	20th	(Brazil) Marcelo Cabo	6 May 2024	
Ferroviário	(Brazil) Maurício Copertino	Sacked	7 May 2024	17th	(Brazil) Paulinho Kobayashi	7 May 2024	
CSA	(Brazil) Cristian de Souza	Sacked	13 May 2024	14th	(Brazil) Bebeto Moraes (caretaker)	14 May 2024	
Sampaio Corrêa	(Brazil) Thiago Gomes	Sacked	14 May 2024	15th	(Brazil) Zé Augusto	14 May 2024	
Londrina	(Brazil) Emerson Ávila	Sacked	14 May 2024	10th	(Brazil) Claudinei Oliveira	15 May 2024	
Remo	(Paraguay) Gustavo Morínigo	Sacked	20 May 2024	14th	(Brazil) Rodrigo Santana (Note: Alan Ribeiro was the caretaker head coach in the 6th round match against Náutico on 25 May.)	23 May 2024	
CSA	(Brazil) Bebeto Moraes	End of caretaker spell	20 May 2024	15th	(Brazil) Higo Magalhães	20 May 2024	
Náutico	(Brazil) Mazola Júnior	Sacked	10 June 2024	11th	(Brazil) Bruno Pivetti	11 June 2024	
Confiança	(Brazil) Gerson Gusmão	Mutual agreement	17 June 2024	14th	(Brazil) Mazola Júnior	19 June 2024	
Caxias	(Brazil) Argel Fuchs	Sacked	27 June 2024	18th	(Brazil) Roberto Maschio (caretaker)	27 June 2024	
Caxias	(Brazil) Roberto Maschio	End of caretaker spell	30 June 2024	19th	(Brazil) Thiago Gomes	29 June 2024	
São José	(Brazil) Pingo	Sacked	5 July 2024	20th	(Brazil) Rogério Zimmermann	5 July 2024	
Aparecidense	(Brazil) Lúcio Flávio	Sacked	7 July 2024	15th	(Brazil) Emerson Ávila	9 July 2024	
Ferroviária	(Brazil) Vinícius Bergantin	Signed by Flamengo	20 July 2024	5th	(Brazil) Júnior Rocha	20 July 2024	
Sampaio Corrêa	(Brazil) Zé Augusto	Sacked	29 July 2024	16th	(Brazil) Felipe Surian	30 July 2024	
Ferroviário	(Brazil) Paulinho Kobayashi	Sacked	6 August 2024	19th	(Brazil) Ranielle Ribeiro	6 August 2024	
Ferroviário	(Brazil) Ranielle Ribeiro	Resigned	23 August 2024	19th	(Brazil) Raimundo Wágner (caretaker)	23 August 2024	

== First stage ==
In the first stage, each team played the other nineteen teams in a single round-robin tournament. The teams were ranked according to points (3 points for a win, 1 point for a draw, and 0 points for a loss). If tied on points, the following criteria would be used to determine the ranking: 1. Wins; 2. Goal difference; 3. Goals scored; 4. Fewest red cards; 5. Fewest yellow cards; 6. Draw in the headquarters of the Brazilian Football Confederation (Regulations Article 16).

The top eight teams advanced to the second stage, while the bottom four were relegated to Série D.

=== Group A ===
Pos	Team	Pld	W	D	L	GF	GA	GD	Pts	Qualification or relegation
1	Botafogo-PB	19	12	5	2	33	21	+12	41	Advance to Second stage
2	Athletic	19	12	4	3	39	21	+18	40	Advance to Second stage
3	Ferroviária	19	9	9	1	22	9	+13	36	Advance to Second stage
4	São Bernardo	19	10	5	4	29	16	+13	35	Advance to Second stage
5	Volta Redonda	19	10	4	5	30	28	+2	34	Advance to Second stage
6	Ypiranga	19	9	4	6	22	18	+4	31	Advance to Second stage
7	Londrina	19	7	8	4	24	21	+3	29	Advance to Second stage
8	Remo	19	8	2	9	21	23	−2	26	Advance to Second stage
9	Náutico	19	6	7	6	34	25	+9	25	
10	CSA	19	6	7	6	22	26	−4	25	
11	Figueirense	19	6	6	7	19	21	−2	24	
12	Tombense	19	5	8	6	22	21	+1	23	
13	Confiança	19	6	4	9	20	22	−2	22	
14	ABC	19	5	7	7	18	20	−2	22	
15	Caxias	19	6	3	10	20	27	−7	21	
16	Floresta	19	5	4	10	15	27	−12	19	
17	Sampaio Corrêa (R)	19	4	7	8	16	21	−5	19	Relegation to 2025 Campeonato Brasileiro Série D
18	Aparecidense (R)	19	3	7	9	18	28	−10	16	Relegation to 2025 Campeonato Brasileiro Série D
19	Ferroviário (R)	19	3	6	10	19	38	−19	15	Relegation to 2025 Campeonato Brasileiro Série D
20	São José (R)	19	2	5	12	12	22	−10	11	Relegation to 2025 Campeonato Brasileiro Série D

Source: CBF
Rules for classification: 1) points; 2) wins; 3) goal difference; 4) goals scored; 5) fewest red cards; 6) fewest yellow cards; 7) draw.
(R) Relegated

=== Results ===
Home \ Away	ABC	APA	ATH	BOT	CAX	CON	CSA	AFE	FAC	FIG	FLO	LON	NAU	REM	SAM	SBE	SJO	TOM	VOL	YPI
ABC		3–1					0–2				1–0	0–2	0–3	3–1		1–1	0–0	1–0	0–1	
Aparecidense							0–1				1–1	1–2	2–2		2–0	1–1		2–1	1–1	0–0
Athletic	1–0	1–0				3–0			3–1			2–1		3–1		1–4			3–2	3–1
Botafogo-PB	1–0	4–3	3–1		1–1	3–3		2–0	1–0	3–2				1–0			2–1			
Caxias	2–0	3–0	0–4			1–0		0–0	2–1	2–1				2–4			1–0			
Confiança	0–0	3–1					0–1		1–1			1–1		1–0		2–0		0–2	4–1	2–0
CSA			0–5	1–1	2–1			1–1		3–1	1–2		2–2		0–0		1–1			
Ferroviária	1–1	0–0	1–1			1–0						0–0	2–1	2–1			1–0		5–1	
Ferroviário	0–4	2–2					1–1	0–0				1–0			1–1		3–2	3–3	0–2	
Figueirense	1–1	2–0	0–0			2–0		0–1	2–1			0–0		1–0			1–1			
Floresta			1–3	1–2	2–1	1–0		1–4	1–2	0–2					1–0					2–2
Londrina				1–1	2–0		2–2				0–0		3–2		2–0	2–0		3–3	1–1	0–4
Náutico			2–2	2–0	2–2	2–1			4–1	4–0	0–1			4–1		1–1				1–2
Remo		1–0					2–1		2–1		1–0	3–0				0–1		0–0	1–2	1–0
Sampaio Corrêa	2–2		3–1	0–1	2–1	1–0		0–2		1–1			1–1	1–2			2–0			
São Bernardo				1–0	2–0		2–0	0–0	5–0	1–2	2–0				0–0			4–2		1–0
São José		0–1	0–1			1–2					0–0	0–2	2–0	0–0		3–0			1–3	0–1
Tombense			1–1	1–2	2–1		0–1	0–0		1–1	3–0		0–0		1–0		1–0			
Volta Redonda				1–3	1–0		2–1			1–0	2–1		2–1		2–2	1–3		1–1		3–0
Ypiranga	1–1			2–2	1–0		3–1	0–1	2–0	1–0					1–0			1–0		

Source: CBF
Legend: Blue = home team win; Yellow = draw; Red = away team win.

== Second stage ==
In the second stage, each group was played on a home-and-away round-robin basis. The teams were ranked according to points (3 points for a win, 1 point for a draw, and 0 points for a loss). If tied on points, the following criteria would be used to determine the ranking: 1. Wins; 2. Goal difference; 3. Goals scored; 4. Head-to-head (if the tie was only between two teams); 5. Fewest red cards; 6. Fewest yellow cards; 7. Draw in the headquarters of the Brazilian Football Confederation (Regulations Article 20).

The top two teams of each group were promoted to the Série B. Group winners advanced to the finals.

=== Group B ===
Pos	Team	Pld	W	D	L	GF	GA	GD	Pts	Qualification
1	Volta Redonda (P)	6	3	3	0	8	4	+4	12	Advance to Finals and promoted to 2025 Série B
2	Remo (P)	6	2	3	1	6	7	−1	9	Promoted to 2025 Série B
3	Botafogo-PB	6	1	2	3	5	5	0	5	
4	São Bernardo	6	1	2	3	5	8	−3	5	

Source: CBF
Rules for classification: 1) points; 2) wins; 3) goal difference; 4) goals scored; 5) head-to-head results (only between 2 teams); 6) fewest red cards; 7) fewest yellow cards; 8) draw.
(P) Promoted

==== Results ====
Home \ Away	BOT	REM	SBE	VOL
Botafogo-PB		3–0	0–0	0–0
Remo	2–1		1–0	0–0
São Bernardo	1–0	2–2		1–2
Volta Redonda	2–1	1–1	3–1	

Source: CBF
Legend: Blue = home team win; Yellow = draw; Red = away team win.

=== Group C ===
Pos	Team	Pld	W	D	L	GF	GA	GD	Pts	Qualification
1	Athletic (P)	6	3	1	2	11	8	+3	10	Advance to Finals and promoted to 2025 Série B
2	Ferroviária (P)	6	3	1	2	12	12	0	10	Promoted to 2025 Série B
3	Londrina	6	2	1	3	11	12	−1	7	
4	Ypiranga	6	1	3	2	6	8	−2	6	

Source: CBF
Rules for classification: 1) points; 2) wins; 3) goal difference; 4) goals scored; 5) head-to-head results (only between 2 teams); 6) fewest red cards; 7) fewest yellow cards; 8) draw.
(P) Promoted

==== Results ====
Home \ Away	ATH	AFE	LON	YPI
Athletic		3–0	2–1	0–0
Ferroviária	3–2		3–2	4–2
Londrina	2–3	3–2		2–2
Ypiranga	2–1	0–0	0–1	

Source: CBF
Legend: Blue = home team win; Yellow = draw; Red = away team win.

== Finals ==
The finals were played on a home-and-away two-legged basis, with the higher-seeded team hosting the second leg. If tied on aggregate, the away goals rule would not be used, extra time would not be played, and the penalty shoot-out would be used to determine the champions (Regulations Article 21).

The finalists were seeded according to their performance in the tournament. The teams were ranked according to overall points. If tied on overall points, the following criteria would be used to determine the ranking: 1. Overall wins; 2. Overall goal difference; 3. Draw in the headquarters of the Brazilian Football Confederation (Regulations Article 22).

Pos	Team	Pld	W	D	L	GF	GA	GD	Pts	Host
1	(Minas Gerais) Athletic	25	15	5	5	50	29	+21	50	2nd leg
2	(Rio de Janeiro (state)) Volta Redonda	25	13	7	5	38	32	+6	46	1st leg

Source: CBF

The matches were played on 12 and 19 October 2024.

Team 1	Agg.	Team 2	1st leg	2nd leg
Volta Redonda (Rio de Janeiro (state))	3–0	(Minas Gerais) Athletic	1–0	2–0

=== Matches ===
12 October 2024
17:30

Volta Redonda (Rio de Janeiro (state))	1–0	(Minas Gerais) Athletic
Heliardo 67'	Report

Estádio Raulino de Oliveira, Volta Redonda
Attendance: 7,840
Referee: Fábio Augusto Santos Sá Júnior (Sergipe)

19 October 2024
17:30

Athletic (Minas Gerais)	0–2	(Rio de Janeiro (state)) Volta Redonda
	Report	PK 25'; Bruno Santos 71'

Arena Sicredi, São João del-Rei
Referee: Luiz Flávio de Oliveira (São Paulo)

== Top goalscorers ==
As of 12 October 2024

Rank	Player	Club	Goals
1	(Brazil) Kayke	São Bernardo	10
1	(Brazil) Paulo Sérgio	Náutico	10
3	(Brazil) Carlão	Ferroviária	9
3	(Brazil) Jonathas	Athletic	9
3	(Brazil) Tiago Marques	CSA	9
6	(Brazil) Denilson	Athletic	8
6	(Brazil) Ítalo	Volta Redonda	8
6	(Brazil) Zé Vítor	Ypiranga	8

Source: CBF
