= 2021 Campeonato Carioca =

Campeonato Carioca
- Season: 2021
- Dates: 16 January 2021 - 22 May 2021
- Champions: Flamengo (37th title)
- Relegated: America; Americano; Cabofriense; Friburguense; Macaé; Sampaio Corrêa
- Copa do Brasil: Nova Iguaçu; Portuguesa; Vasco da Gama; Volta Redonda
- Série D: Portuguesa; Nova Iguaçu
- Matches: 108
- Goals: 283 (2.62 per match)
- Top goalscorer: Alef Manga (9 goals)
- Biggest home win: Portuguesa 5–1 Bangu
- Biggest away win: Madureira 1–5 Flamengo; Macaé 0–4 Fluminense
- Highest scoring: Americano 4–4 Friburguense (8 goals)
- Longest winning run: Nova Iguaçu (4 games)
- Longest unbeaten run: Cabofriense (9 games)
- Longest winless run: Macaé (All games)
- Longest losing run: Macaé (8 games)
- Highest attendance: 0
- Lowest attendance: 0
- Average attendance: 0

The 2021 Campeonato Carioca de Futebol was the 118th edition of the top division of football in the state of Rio de Janeiro. The competition is organized by FERJ. It began on 16 January 2021 and ended on 22 May 2021. The tournament was played behind closed doors due to the coronavirus pandemic in Brazil. In order to lower the number of matches to be played, this edition of the Campeonato Carioca faced another change in format and regulations. Flamengo, the defending champions, won a record-breaking 37th Campeonato Carioca title and their third title in a row.

== Participating teams ==
Location of teams in the 2021 Campeonato Carioca
Location of teams in the 2021 Campeonato Carioca – city of Rio de Janeiro

Club	Home City	Manager	2020 Result
America Football Club	Mesquita	Álvaro Gaia and Josué Teixeira	15th
Americano Futebol Clube	Cardoso Moreira (Note: Although Americano FC is headquartered in Campos dos Goytacazes, it played home games at Antônio Ferreira de Medeiros Stadium)	Caé Cunha	14th
Bangu Atlético Clube	Rio de Janeiro (Bangu)	Marcelo Marelli	8th
Boavista Sport Club	Saquarema	Leandrão	4th
Botafogo de Futebol e Regatas	Rio de Janeiro (Engenho de Dentro) (Note: Although Botafogo FR is headquartered in Botafogo, it plays home games at Engenhão Stadium)	Marcelo Chamusca	5th
Associação Desportiva Cabofriense	Cabo Frio	Rogério Corrêa	12th
Clube de Regatas do Flamengo	Rio de Janeiro (Maracanã) (Note: Although CR Flamengo is headquartered in Lagoa, it plays home games at Maracanã Stadium)	Rogério Ceni	1st
Fluminense Football Club	Rio de Janeiro (Maracanã) (Note: Although Fluminense FC is headquartered in Laranjeiras, it plays home games at Maracanã Stadium)	Roger Machado	2nd
Friburguense Atlético Clube	Nova Friburgo	Cadão	13th
Macaé Esporte Futebol Clube	Macaé	Eduardo Allax, Charles de Almeida, Dário Lourenço and Luciano Lamóglia	11th
Madureira Esporte Clube	Rio de Janeiro (Madureira)	Toninho Andrade and Alfredo Sampaio	6th
Nova Iguaçu Futebol Clube	Nova Iguaçu	Carlos Vitor	1st (Série B1)
Associação Atlética Portuguesa	Rio de Janeiro (Governador Island)	Felipe Surian	9th
Resende Futebol Clube	Resende	Sandro Sargentim	10th
Sampaio Corrêa Futebol e Esporte	Saquarema	Flávio Tinoco	2nd (Série B1)
Club de Regatas Vasco da Gama	Rio de Janeiro (Vasco da Gama)	Marcelo Cabo	7th
Volta Redonda Futebol Clube	Volta Redonda	Neto Colucci	3rd

== Format ==
The competition format went through a series of alterations in order to minimize the number of matches to be played. The relegation play-offs, Taça Independência and Torneio Extra were scrapped, and the main phase was played in a single round-robin, instead of a double round-robin.

=== Preliminary stage ===
The preliminary stage of the tournament was contested as a double round-robin among the four worst-placed teams of the 2020 Campeonato Carioca and the two teams promoted from the 2020 Série B1. The winner of the preliminary stage qualified for the main phase of the competition while the remaining five were relegated to the 2021 Série A2 (the second tier being rebranded from B1 to A2).

=== Main stage ===
In the main competition, the twelve clubs played each other in a single round-robin called the Taça Guanabara. The last placed club was relegated to the 2021 Série A2. The top four clubs qualified for the final stage while the next four clubs (5th to 8th places) qualified for the Taça Rio. In the Taça Rio, the 5th-placed club faced the 8th-placed club, and the 6th-placed club faced the 7th-placed club. In the final stage, the winner of the Taça Guanabara faced the 4th-placed club, while the runners-up faced the 3rd-placed club. In both of these four-team brackets (the Taça Rio and the final stage), the semifinals and finals were played over two legs, without the use of the away goals rule. In the semifinals of both the Taça Rio and the final stage, the better placed teams in the Taça Guanabara table advanced in case of an aggregate tie. In the finals of both brackets, there was no such advantage; in case of an aggregate tie, a penalty shoot-out would take place.

The top three teams of the Campeonato Carioca and the winner of the Taça Rio qualified for the 2022 Copa do Brasil. Since Botafogo also qualified for the 2022 Copa do Brasil via winning the 2021 national Série B, and Flamengo and Fluminense qualified for the 2022 Copa do Brasil via the 2021 national Série A, their Campeonato Carioca berths went to the next best team. The top two teams of the Campeonato Carioca that were not already playing in the Campeonato Brasileiro Série A, Série B or Série C qualified for the 2022 Série D.

== Preliminary stage ==
America, Americano, Cabofriense and Friburguense were the four lowest placed teams in the 2020 Campeonato Carioca main tournament. Nova Iguaçu and Sampaio Corrêa qualified from the 2020 Série B1. The preliminary stage was contested from 16 January 2021 to 20 February 2021.

Pos	Team	Pld	W	D	L	GF	GA	GD	Pts	Qualification
1	Nova Iguaçu	10	7	2	1	12	5	+7	23	Advanced to 2021 Taça Guanabara
2	Cabofriense	10	6	3	1	17	10	+7	21	Relegation to 2021 Série A2
3	Sampaio Corrêa	10	4	2	4	10	9	+1	14	Relegation to 2021 Série A2
4	America	10	2	6	2	12	13	−1	12	Relegation to 2021 Série A2
5	Americano	10	3	1	6	13	17	−4	10	Relegation to 2021 Série A2
6	Friburguense	10	0	2	8	11	21	−10	2	Relegation to 2021 Série A2

Source: FERJ
Rules for classification: 1) points; 2) wins; 3) goal difference; 4) goals scored; 5) head-to-head results; 6) disciplinary record; 7) random draw.

Home \ Away	AME	AMO	CAB	FRI	NIG	SAM
America		3–1	1–1	4–4	1–1	1–1
Americano	3–0		3–2	2–1	1–3	1–2
Cabofriense	0–0	2–1		2–1	1–0	2–1
Friburguense	1–2	1–1	2–5		0–1	1–2
Nova Iguaçu	1–0	1–0	1–1	1–0		1–0
Sampaio Corrêa	0–0	2–0	0–1	1–0	1–2	

Source: FERJ
Legend: Blue = home team win; Yellow = draw; Red = away team win.

== Main stage ==
=== Taça Guanabara ===
Pos	Team	Pld	W	D	L	GF	GA	GD	Pts	Qualification
1	Flamengo (Q)	11	7	2	2	23	10	+13	23	Taça Guanabara Champion and advance to semifinals
2	Fluminense (Q)	11	7	1	3	20	11	+9	22	Advance to semifinals
3	Portuguesa (Q)	11	6	3	2	20	8	+12	21	Advance to semifinals
4	Volta Redonda (Q)	11	6	3	2	17	12	+5	21	Advance to semifinals
5	Vasco da Gama (Q)	11	4	5	2	21	15	+6	17	Advance to Taça Rio semifinals
6	Nova Iguaçu (Q)	11	4	3	4	16	15	+1	15	Advance to Taça Rio semifinals
7	Botafogo (Q)	11	3	6	2	14	9	+5	15	Advance to Taça Rio semifinals
8	Madureira (Q)	11	3	6	2	13	16	−3	15	Advance to Taça Rio semifinals
9	Resende	11	3	2	6	11	21	−10	11	
10	Boavista	11	2	5	4	14	16	−2	11	
11	Bangu	11	1	3	7	5	18	−13	6	
12	Macaé (R)	11	0	1	10	6	29	−23	1	Relegated

Source: FERJ
Rules for classification: 1) points; 2) wins; 3) goal difference; 4) goals scored; 5) head-to-head results; 6) disciplinary record; 7) random draw.
(Q) Qualified; (R) Relegated

2021 Taça Guanabara champions
Flamengo
23rd title

=== Taça Rio – Final stage ===
Semi-finals
5	Vasco da Gama	0	2	2
8	Madureira	1	1	2
6	Nova Iguaçu	0	0	0
7	Botafogo	0	1	1

Finals
5	Vasco da Gama	1	0	1 (3)
7	Botafogo	0	1	0 (0)

2021 Taça Rio champions
Vasco da Gama
11th title

=== Final stage ===
Semi-finals
1	Flamengo	3	4	7
4	Volta Redonda	0	1	1
2	Fluminense	1	3	4
3	Portuguesa	1	1	2

Finals
1	Flamengo	1	3	4
2	Fluminense	1	1	2

2021 Campeonato Carioca champions
Flamengo
37th title

== Top goalscorers ==
Rank	Player	Club	Goals
1	(Brazil) Alef Manga	Volta Redonda	9
2	(Brazil) Gabriel	Flamengo	8
3	(Brazil) Luiz Paulo	Madureira	6
3	(Brazil) Pedro	Flamengo	6
3	(Brazil) Anderson Künzel	Nova Iguaçu	6
3	(Argentina) Germán Cano	Vasco da Gama	6
3	(Brazil) Fred	Fluminense	6
4	(Brazil) Gabriel Pec	Vasco da Gama	5
4	(Brazil) Rodrigo Muniz	Flamengo	5
4	(Brazil) Chay	Portuguesa	5
4	(Brazil) João Carlos	Volta Redonda	5
4	(Brazil) Vitinho	Flamengo	5

Source:FERJ
