= 2022 Campeonato Paraibano =

112th edition of Paraíba's football league

Campeonato Paraibano de Futebol
- Season: 2022
- Dates: 3 February 2022 – 25 May 2022
- Champions: Campinense
- Relegated: Atlético Cajazeirense; Sport-PB
- 2023 Copa do Brasil: Botafogo-PB; Campinense
- 2023 Série D: Sousa; São Paulo Crystal
- 2023 Copa do Nordeste: Campinense
- 2023 Copa do Nordeste qualification: Sousa; Botafogo-PB (via RNC)
- Matches: 47
- Goals: 135 (2.87 per match)
- Top goalscorer: 11 goals Olávio, Campinense
- Biggest home win: Botafogo-PB 7–0 Atlético Cajazeirense; Group A, Round 10, 6 April 2022
- Biggest away win: Sport-PB 0–5 Treze; Group B, Round 1, 5 February 2022
- Highest scoring: Botafogo-PB 7–0 Atlético Cajazeirense; Group A, Round 10, 6 April 2022
- Longest winning run: 6 Campinense
- Longest unbeaten run: 11 Campinense
- Longest winless run: 8 Atlético Cajazeirense
- Longest losing run: 4 Atlético Cajazeirense; Sport-PB
- All statistics correct as of 09:30, 23 May 2022 (UTC).

The 2022 Campeonato Paraibano de Futebol was the 112th edition of Paraíba's top professional football league. The competition was scheduled to start on 3 February 2022, although dates beyond the first phase were not initially fixed due to potential clashes with 2022 Copa do Nordeste and 2022 Copa do Brasil.

Campinense were crowned champions, winning their 22nd title after beating Botafogo-PB over two legs in the final.

== Format ==
The competition was divided into a number of stages; a group phase, a repechage, a semi-final, a final and a third-place play-off.

In the group phase, the ten teams were divided into two groups of five, and played the other teams in their group home and away. The teams finishing top in each group qualified directly for the semi-final. The teams finishing bottom of each group were relegated to the second division.

In the repechage, the second placed team in each group played the third placed team in the other group in a single game. The winners of the two matches qualified for the semi-finals.

The semi-final and final were played over two legs, with a penalty shoot-out deciding the tie if results were level after the two legs. The semi-finals paired the winner of each group phase with the winner of the repechage match featuring the third-placed team from the same group. In the final, the team with the best record in the competition to date was designated the home team for the second leg.

The third-place play-off was scheduled to be a single match, with extra time and penalties if required.

=== Qualification ===
The two finalists qualified to participate in the 2023 Copa do Brasil, unless they obtain qualification via other means, in which case the place passed to the third-placed team. The champion qualified to participate in the 2023 Copa do Nordeste. The two best placed teams (other than those already participating in a national league) qualified to participate in the 2023 Campeonato Brasileiro Série D.

== Participating teams ==
Club	Home city	Manager	2021 result
Atlético Cajazeirense	Cajazeiras	Jaelson Marcelino	6th
Auto Esporte	João Pessoa	Jazon Vieira	3rd (Second division)
Botafogo-PB	João Pessoa	Gerson Gusmão	3rd
Campinense	Campina Grande	Ranielle Ribeiro	1st
CSP	João Pessoa	Josivaldo Alves	1st (Second division)
Nacional de Patos	Patos	Lamar	7th
São Paulo Crystal	Cruz do Espírito Santo	Ederson Araújo	4th
Sousa	Sousa	Tardelly Abrantes	2nd
Sport-PB	Lagoa Seca	Betão Caitano	2nd (Second division)
Treze	Campina Grande	Marcelinho Paraíba	5th

== Group phase ==
=== Group A ===
Pos	Team	Pld	W	D	L	GF	GA	GD	Pts	Qualification
1	Botafogo-PB (Q)	8	5	2	1	17	5	+12	17	Advance to semi-final stage
2	Sousa (Q)	8	5	2	1	13	3	+10	17	Advance to repechage
3	São Paulo Crystal (Q)	8	2	4	2	7	9	−2	10	Advance to repechage
4	Auto Esporte	8	2	2	4	5	12	−7	8	
5	Atlético Cajazeirense (R)	8	0	2	6	2	15	−13	2	Relegated to Second Division

Rules for classification: 1) points; 2) wins; 3) goal difference; 4) number of goals scored; 5) least red cards; 6) least yellow cards.
(Q) Qualified for the phase indicated; (R) Relegated

=== Group B ===
Pos	Team	Pld	W	D	L	GF	GA	GD	Pts	Qualification
1	Campinense (Note: Campinense were awarded a 3–0 walkover in the opening round match against Nacional de Patos, scheduled for 3 February 2022, due to Nacional not being able to register any players for the game.) (Q)	8	7	1	0	21	4	+17	22	Advance to semi-final stage
2	Nacional de Patos (Q)	8	4	1	3	20	15	+5	13	Advance to repechage
3	Treze (Q)	8	3	3	2	17	8	+9	12	Advance to repechage
4	CSP	8	2	1	5	16	17	−1	7	
5	Sport-PB (R)	8	1	0	7	3	33	−30	3	Relegated to Second Division

Rules for classification: 1) points; 2) wins; 3) goal difference; 4) number of goals scored; 5) least red cards; 6) least yellow cards.
(Q) Qualified for the phase indicated; (R) Relegated

== Repechage ==
In the repechage phase, the 2nd placed team in each group played off against the 3rd placed team in the other group, in a single game. The 2nd placed teams had the home advantage.

10 April 2022	Sousa	1–0 (a.e.t.)	Treze	João Pessoa
16:00 BRT	Maycon Rangel 94'	Report		Stadium: Almeidão

10 April 2022	Nacional de Patos	4–0	São Paulo Crystal	Patos
17:00 BRT	Felipe Araújo 46'; Romarinho 56'; Pedrão 71'; Dú Paraíba 80'	Report		Stadium: José Cavalcanti

== Semi-final ==
The semi-final paired the winner of each group phase with the winner of the repechage match featuring the third-placed team from the same group, and was played over two legs, with a penalty shoot-out deciding the tie if results were level.

Team 1	Agg.	Team 2	1st leg	2nd leg
Nacional de Patos	3–4	Botafogo-PB	3–1	0–3
Sousa	1–2	Campinense	0–1	1–1

=== First legs ===
20 April 2022	Nacional de Patos	3–1	Botafogo-PB	Patos
20:15 BRT	Dindé 1'; Felipe Araújo 17', 71'	Report	Gustavo Coutinho 46'	Stadium: José Cavalcanti

20 April 2022	Sousa	0–1	Campinense	Sousa
20:15 BRT	Marcelo (red card) 61'	Report	Dione 16'	Stadium: Marizão

=== Second legs ===
26 April 2022	Botafogo-PB	3–0	Nacional de Patos	João Pessoa
20:15 BRT	Alan Grafite 16'; Bruno Ré 50'; Gustavo Coutinho 55'	Report		Stadium: Almeidão

27 April 2022	Campinense	1–1	Sousa	Campina Grande
20:15 BRT	Luiz Fernando 35'	Report	Otacílio Marcos 71'	Stadium: Amigão

== Final ==
The final was played over two legs.

Team 1	Agg.	Team 2	1st leg	2nd leg
Botafogo-PB	1–3	Campinense	1–2	0–1

=== First leg ===
14 May 2022	Botafogo-PB	1–2	Campinense	João Pessoa
16:00 BRT	Alessandro 65'	Report	Olávio 70'; Dione 78'	Stadium: Almeidão

=== Second leg ===
21 May 2022	Campinense	1–0	Botafogo-PB	Campina Grande
16:00 BRT	Olávio 68'	Report		Stadium: Amigão

Campinense are champions of 2022 Campeonato Paraibano

== Third-place playoff ==
The third place play-off was scheduled to take place over a single game, with extra time and penalties if required. On 29 April, at the request of both qualified teams, the FPF cancelled the game due to the unnecessary costs, and both teams having already qualified for Série D. Third place was awarded to Sousa.

Sousa	cancelled	Nacional de Patos	Sousa
			Stadium: Marizão

Sousa awarded third-place
