= 2023 Santa Cruz Futebol Clube season =

Santa Cruz
2023 season
- Chairman: Joaquim Bezerra
- Manager: Ranielle Ribeiro; Felipe Conceição; Evaristo Piza
- Stadium: Estádio do Arruda
- Série D: 35th
- Pernambucano: Quarter-finals
- Copa do Brasil: Second round
- Copa do Nordeste: Group stage
- Top goalscorer: League: Pipico and Emerson Galego (4); All: Pipico (11)
Home colours	Away colours	Third colours

The 2023 season was Santa Cruz's 110th season in the club's history. Santa Cruz competed in the Campeonato Pernambucano, Série D, Copa do Nordeste and Copa do Brasil.

== Squad ==
Note: Flags indicate national team as defined under FIFA eligibility rules; some limited exceptions apply. Players may hold more than one non-FIFA nationality.

No.	Pos.	Nation	Player
1	GK	BRA	Michael Fracaro
12	GK	BRA	Matheus Inácio
—	GK	BRA	Geaze
4	DF	BRA	Alemão
14	DF	BRA	Yan Oliveira
3	DF	BRA	Ítalo Melo
15	DF	BRA	Gabriel Yanno
13	DF	BRA	Eduardo Ferraz
16	DF	BRA	Paim
6	DF	BRA	Eduardo Guedes
5	MF	BRA	Daniel Pereira
—	MF	BRA	Pingo

No.	Pos.	Nation	Player
8	MF	BRA	Anderson Paulista
10	MF	BRA	Anderson Ceará
7	MF	BRA	Ítalo Henrique
—	MF	BRA	Fabrício Bigode
23	MF	BRA	Chiquinho
—	MF	BRA	Felipe Gedoz
22	MF	BRA	Maranhão
—	FW	BRA	Emerson Galego
—	FW	BRA	Hugo Cabral
—	FW	BRA	Pipico
—	FW	BRA	Michel Douglas
—	FW	BRA	Dagson

== Statistics ==
=== Overall ===
Games played	39 (10 Copa do Nordeste, 13 Pernambucano, 2 Copa do Brasil, 14 Série D)
Games won	13 (4 Copa do Nordeste, 4 Pernambucano, 0 Copa do Brasil, 5 Série D)
Games drawn	16 (3 Copa do Nordeste, 7 Pernambucano, 1 Copa do Brasil, 5 Série D)
Games lost	10 (3 Copa do Nordeste, 2 Pernambucano, 1 Copa do Brasil, 4 Série D)
Goals scored	46
Goals conceded	42
Goal difference	+4
Best results (goal difference)	3–0 (H) v Globo – Série D – 2023.06.14
Worst result (goal difference)	0–4 (H) v Fortaleza – Copa do Nordeste – 2023.03.22
Top scorer	Pipico (11)

Source: Santa Cruz official website

=== Goalscorers ===
Place	Position	Nationality	Number	Name	Copa do Nordeste	Campeonato Pernambucano	Copa do Brasil	Série D	Total
1	FW	(Brazil)	9	Pipico	2	4	1	4	11
2	FW	(Brazil)	18	Emerson Galego	0	0	0	4	4
3	MF	(Brazil)	10	Felipe Gedoz	2	1	0	0	3
3	FW	(Brazil)	7	Lucas Silva	2	0	0	1	3
3	DF	(Brazil)	14	Yan Oliveira	1	1	0	1	3
4	FW	(Brazil)	23	Dayvid	2	0	0	0	2
4	DF	(Brazil)	3	Ítalo Melo	0	1	0	1	2
4	MF	(Brazil)	22	Maranhão	1	0	0	1	2
4	FW	(Brazil)	19	Michel Douglas	1	1	0	0	2
5	DF	(Brazil)	4	Alemão	0	1	0	0	1
5	MF	(Brazil)	20	Anderson Ceará	1	0	0	0	1
5	MF	(Brazil)	15	Anderson Paulista	0	1	0	0	1
5	MF	(Brazil)	8	Arthur Santos	0	1	0	0	1
5	MF	(Brazil)	10	Chiquinho	0	1	0	0	1
5	FW	(Brazil)	9	Dagson	0	1	0	0	1
5	MF	(Brazil)	8	Fabrício Bigode	0	0	0	1	1
5	DF	(Brazil)	4	Guedes	0	0	0	1	1
5	FW	(Brazil)	11	Hugo Cabral	1	0	0	0	1
5	DF	(Brazil)	13	Jadson	0	1	0	0	1
5	FW	(Brazil)	20	Lucas Vinicius	0	1	0	0	1
5	DF	(Brazil)	6	Marcus Vinícius	1	0	0	0	1
5	FW	(Brazil)	21	Miullen	0	0	0	1	1
				Own goals	0	1	0	0	1
				Total	14	16	1	15	46

=== Managers performance ===
Name	Nationality	From	To	P	W	D	L	GF	GA	Avg%	Ref
Ranielle Ribeiro	Brazil	5 January 2023	22 March 2023	21	6	10	5	23	24	44%	
Felipe Conceição	Brazil	25 March 2023	10 July 2023	16	7	5	4	22	16	54%	
Evaristo Piza	Brazil	16 July 2023	23 July 2023	2	0	1	1	1	2	16%	

== Friendlies ==
=== National ===
16 December 2023	Serra Branca	0–0	Santa Cruz	Campina Grande
(UTC-3)		Report		Stadium: Estádio Governador Ernani Sátyro (Amigão); Referee: Jamerson Souza

30 December 2023	Treze	1–1	Santa Cruz	Queimadas
(UTC-3)	Vitão 81'	Report	Gabriel Cardoso 15'	Stadium: Estádio Municipal de Queimadas Saulo Leal Ernesto de Melo; Referee: Jamerson Souza

== Official competitions ==
=== Copa do Nordeste ===
==== Preliminary round ====
5 January 2023	Santa Cruz	2–0	Caucaia	Recife
21:30 (UTC-3)	Hugo Cabral 53'; Dayvid 90+1'	Report		Stadium: Estádio José do Rego Maciel (Arruda); Attendance: 100; Referee: José Ricardo Vasconcellos Laranjeira

8 January 2023	Santa Cruz	2–1	Botafogo–PB	Recife
19:15 (UTC-3)	Michel Douglas 30'; Anderson Ceará 54'	Report	Lucas 45'	Stadium: Estádio José do Rego Maciel (Arruda); Attendance: 121; Referee: Leonilson Fernandes Trigueiro Filho

==== Group stage ====
21 January 2023 1	Vitória	1–1	Santa Cruz	Salvador
17:30 (UTC-3)	Zeca 65'	Report	Yan Oliveira 90+6'	Stadium: Estádio Manoel Barradas (Barradão); Attendance: 7,282; Referee: Caio Max Augusto Vieira

8 February 2023 2	Santa Cruz	2–2	Fluminense–PI	Recife
20:00 (UTC-3)	Dayvid 39'; Pipico 54'	Report	Augusto 27'; Carlinhos 68'	Stadium: Estádio José do Rego Maciel (Arruda); Attendance: 6,285; Referee: Afro Rocha de Carvalho Filho

14 February 2023 3	Santa Cruz	2–1	Atlético de Alagoinhas	Recife
19:30 (UTC-3)	Lucas Silva 14', 45'	Report	Emerson 39'	Stadium: Estádio José do Rego Maciel (Arruda); Attendance: 5,016; Referee: Fábio Augusto Santos Sa Junior

22 February 2023 5	CRB	2–1	Santa Cruz	Maceió
19:00 (UTC-3)	Anselmo Ramon 20'; Fábio Alemão 29'	Report	Marcus Vinícius 48'	Stadium: Estádio Rei Pelé; Attendance: 4,983; Referee: Bruno Pereira Vasconcelos

5 March 2023 6	Santa Cruz	3–1	Sampaio Corrêa	Recife
18:30 (UTC-3)	Felipe Gedoz 44', 49'; Maranhão 75'	Report	Matheus 66'	Stadium: Estádio José do Rego Maciel (Arruda); Attendance: 15,008; Referee: Adriano Barros Carneiro

8 March 2023 7	Ferroviário	2–1	Santa Cruz	Fortaleza
19:00 (UTC-3)	Ciel 85'; Erick Pulga 90+2'	Report	Pipico 13'	Stadium: Estádio Presidente Vargas; Attendance: 2,282; Referee: Afro Rocha de Carvalho Filho

18 March 2023 4	Sport	0–0	Santa Cruz	São Lourenço da Mata
17:30 (UTC-3)		Report		Stadium: Estádio Governador Carlos Wilson Campos (Arena Pernambuco); Attendance: 27,502; Referee: Emerson Ricardo de Almeida Andrade

22 March 2023 8	Santa Cruz	0–4	Fortaleza	Recife
21:30 (UTC-3)		Report	Lucero 1'; Lucas Crispim 61'; Hércules 65'; Moisés 86'	Stadium: Estádio José do Rego Maciel (Arruda); Attendance: 9,018; Referee: José Ricardo Vasconcellos Laranjeira

==== Record ====
Final Position	Points	Matches	Wins	Draws	Losses	Goals For	Goals Away	Win%
9th	15	10	4	3	3	14	14	50%

=== Campeonato Pernambucano ===
==== First stage ====
12 January 2023	Santa Cruz	1–1	Afogados da Ingazeira	Recife
20:00 (UTC-3)	Dagson 88' (pen.)	Report	Venícius 17' (pen.)	Stadium: Estádio José do Rego Maciel (Arruda); Referee: Hugo Soares Dias Figueiredo

15 January 2023	Santa Cruz	3–3	Náutico	Recife
16:30 (UTC-3)	Yan Oliveira 6'; Anílson 20' (o.g.); Arthur Santos 43'	Report	Júlio 15', 37'; Anílson 53'	Stadium: Estádio José do Rego Maciel (Arruda); Attendance: 15,389; Referee: Rodrigo Jose Pereira de Lima

18 January 2023	Porto	0–0	Santa Cruz	Caruaru
21:00 (UTC-3)		Report		Stadium: Estádio Luiz José de Lacerda (Lacerdão); Referee: Diego Fernando Silva de Lima

26 January 2023	Santa Cruz	1–0	Caruaru City	Recife
20:00 (UTC-3)	Michel Douglas 53'	Report		Stadium: Estádio José do Rego Maciel (Arruda); Referee: Luiz Claudio Sobral

29 January 2023	Santa Cruz	1–1	Maguary	Recife
16:30 (UTC-3)	Lucas Vinicius 90+5'	Report	Kelvin 90+1'	Stadium: Estádio José do Rego Maciel (Arruda); Attendance: 8,011; Referee: Gilberto Rodrigues Castro Junior

1 February 2023	Petrolina	0–0	Santa Cruz	Petrolina
20:00 (UTC-3)		Report		Stadium: Estádio Paulo de Souza Coelho; Referee: Nairon Pereira de Lira

4 February 2023	Salgueiro	0–1	Santa Cruz	Salgueiro
16:30 (UTC-3)		Report	Felipe Gedoz 56'	Stadium: Estádio Cornélio de Barros Muniz; Referee: José Woshington

25 February 2023	Retrô	1–1	Santa Cruz	São Lourenço da Mata
16:30 (UTC-3)	Israel 82'	Report	Alemão 37'	Stadium: Estádio Governador Carlos Wilson Campos (Arena Pernambuco); Referee: Rodrigo Jose Pereira de Lima

11 March 2023	Sport	2–0	Santa Cruz	Recife
16:30 (UTC-3)	Jorginho 15'; Luciano Juba 62'	Report		Stadium: Estádio Adelmar da Costa Carvalho (Ilha do Retiro); Attendance: 16,057; Referee: Deborah Cecília

25 March 2023	Santa Cruz	3–1	Central	Recife
16:30 (UTC-3)	Pipico 16'; Ítalo Melo 40'; Jadson 84'	Report	Ítalo Melo 72' (o.g.)	Stadium: Estádio José do Rego Maciel (Arruda); Referee: Deborah Cecilia Cruz Correia

28 March 2023	Santa Cruz	1–3	Íbis	Recife
20:30 (UTC-3)	Chiquinho 53'	Report	Celestino 27'; Thoni Brandão 55', 61'	Stadium: Estádio José do Rego Maciel (Arruda); Attendance: 4,456; Referee: Hugo Soares Dias Figueiredo

1 April 2023	Belo Jardim	1–3	Santa Cruz	São Lourenço da Mata
16:30 (UTC-3)	Berg 32'	Report	Pipico 22', 24', 59'	Stadium: Estádio Governador Carlos Wilson Campos (Arena Pernambuco); Attendance: 1,117; Referee: Diego Fernando Silva de Lima

==== Quarter-final ====
4 April 2023	Petrolina	1–1 (5–4 p)	Santa Cruz	Petrolina
(UTC-3)	Acauã 45'	Report	Anderson Paulista 77'	Stadium: Estádio Paulo de Souza Coelho; Referee: Gilberto Rodrigues Castro Junior
	Penalties
	Emerson Galego (penalty scored); Igor Tavares (penalty missed); Kiko (penalty scored); Brendon (penalty scored); Mailson (penalty scored); Marquinhos Bahia (penalty missed); Raykar (penalty scored)		(penalty scored) Pipico; (penalty missed) Ítalo Melo; (penalty scored) Anderson Ceará; (penalty scored) Chiquinho; (penalty scored) Felipe Gedoz; (penalty missed) Ariel; (penalty missed) Lucas Silva

==== Record ====
Final Position	Points	Matches	Wins	Draws	Losses	Goals For	Goals Away	Win%
6th	19	13	4	7	2	16	14	48%

=== Copa do Brasil ===
==== First round ====
28 February 2023	Democrata GV	1–1	Santa Cruz	Governador Valadares
19:30 (UTC-3)	Gabriel Vieira 45+1' (pen.)	Report	Pipico 90+4'	Stadium: Estádio José Mammoud Abbas; Attendance: 5,255; Referee: João Vitor Gobi

==== Second round ====
14 March 2023	América Mineiro	1–0	Santa Cruz	Belo Horizonte
21:30 (UTC-3)	Benítez 45+1'	Report		Stadium: Arena Independência; Attendance: 2,590; Referee: Ramon Abatti Abel

==== Record ====
Final Position	Points	Matches	Wins	Draws	Losses	Goals For	Goals Away	Win%
50th	1	2	0	1	1	1	2	16%

=== Série D ===
==== Group stage ====
8 May 2023 1	Santa Cruz	1–0	Iguatu	Recife
20:00 (UTC-3)	Pipico 53'	Report		Stadium: Estádio José do Rego Maciel (Arruda); Attendance: 13,026; Referee: Julian Negreiros de Castro

14 May 2023 2	Potiguar	2–1	Santa Cruz	Mossoró
17:00 (UTC-3)	Romeu 63'; Fernando Victor 90+6'	Report	Pipico 52'	Stadium: Estádio Leonardo Nogueira (Nogueirão); Attendance: 781; Referee: Renan Novaes Insabralde

21 May 2023 3	Santa Cruz	1–0	Campinense	Recife
16:00 (UTC-3)	Ítalo Melo 38'	Report		Stadium: Estádio José do Rego Maciel (Arruda); Attendance: 30,046; Referee: Rafael Martins de Sá

28 May 2023 4	Nacional de Patos	2–2	Santa Cruz	Patos
16:00 (UTC-3)	Arthurzinho 69'; Juninho 90+4'	Report	Pipico 13'; Emerson Galego 77'	Stadium: Estádio José Cavalcanti; Attendance: 2,876; Referee: Robson Babinski

3 June 2023 5	Santa Cruz	1–0	Sousa	Recife
16:00 (UTC-3)	Emerson Galego 16'	Report		Stadium: Estádio José do Rego Maciel (Arruda); Attendance: 17,289; Referee: Diego da Silva Castro

8 June 2023 6	Santa Cruz	0–0	Pacajus	Recife
19:30 (UTC-3)		Report		Stadium: Estádio José do Rego Maciel (Arruda); Attendance: 16,233; Referee: Djonaltan Costa de Araujo

11 June 2023 7	Globo	0–2	Santa Cruz	Ceará-Mirim
15:30 (UTC-3)		Report	Fabrício Bigode 31'; Emerson Galego 77'	Stadium: Estádio Manoel Dantas Barretto (Barrettão); Attendance: 309; Referee: Wasley do Couto Leão

14 June 2023 8	Santa Cruz	3–0	Globo	Recife
20:00 (UTC-3)	Emerson Galego 57'; Yan Oliveira 90+3'; Miullen 90+4'	Report		Stadium: Estádio José do Rego Maciel (Arruda); Attendance: 11,268; Referee: Fernando Henrique de Medeiros Miranda

17 June 2023 9	Pacajus	0–0	Santa Cruz	Pacajus
19:00 (UTC-3)		Report		Stadium: Estádio Municipal João Ronaldo; Attendance: 533; Referee: Michel Patrick Costa Guimarães

28 June 2023 10	Sousa	2–1	Santa Cruz	Sousa
20:00 (UTC-3)	Arthur 62'; Luiz Henrique 65'	Report	Lucas Silva 59'	Stadium: Estádio Governador Antônio Mariz (Marizão); Attendance: 418; Referee: Osimar Moreira da Silva Junior

1 July 2023 11	Santa Cruz	2–2	Nacional de Patos	Recife
20:00 (UTC-3)	Guedes 12'; Pipico 31'	Report	Herbert 20'; Bruno Menezes 57'	Stadium: Estádio José do Rego Maciel (Arruda); Attendance: 13,514; Referee: Ilbert Estevam da Silva

10 July 2023 12	Campinense	2–0	Santa Cruz	Campina Grande
20:00 (UTC-3)	Matheus Lagoa 5'; Gilvan 47'	Report		Stadium: Estádio Governador Ernani Sátyro (Amigão); Attendance: 1,047; Referee: Roger Goulart

16 July 2023 13	Santa Cruz	1–1	Potiguar	Recife
16:00 (UTC-3)	Maranhão 46'	Report	Wilson 42'	Stadium: Estádio José do Rego Maciel (Arruda); Attendance: 14,070; Referee: Leonardo Ferreira Lima

23 July 2023 14	Iguatu	1–0	Santa Cruz	Iguatu
18:00 (UTC-3)	Otacilio Marcos 8'	Report		Stadium: Estádio Municipal Elmo Moreno (Morenão); Attendance: 321; Referee: Grazianni Maciel Rocha

==== Record ====
Final Position	Points	Matches	Wins	Draws	Losses	Goals For	Goals Away	Win%
35th	20	14	5	5	4	15	12	47%
