= Matheus Costa (football manager) =

Brazilian football manager (born 1987)

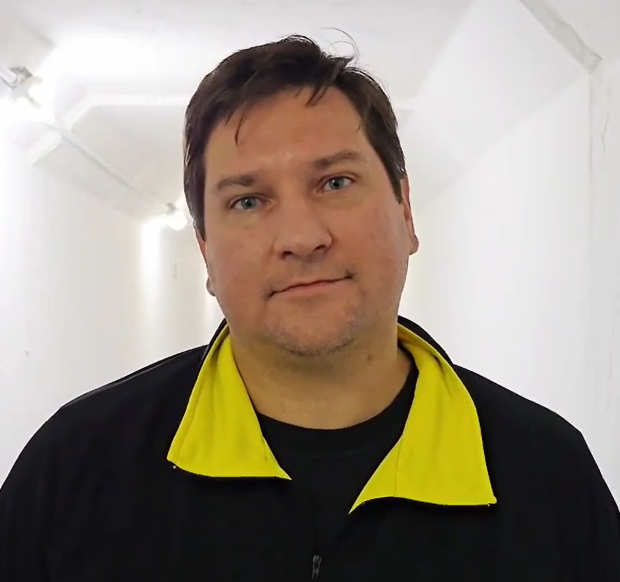
- Costa in 2025

Personal information
- Full name: Matheus Silva Ferreira da Costa
- Date of birth: 14 January 1987 (age 39)
- Place of birth: Curitiba, Brazil

Team information
- Current team: Inter de Limeira (head coach)

Youth career
- Years: Team
- 1996–2002: Paraná (futsal)

Managerial career
- 2013–2015: Internacional U15
- 2016: Fluminense (assistant)
- 2017: Paraná (assistant)
- 2017: Paraná (interim)
- 2017: Paraná
- 2018: Joinville
- 2018–2019: Coritiba (assistant)
- 2019: Coritiba (interim)
- 2019: Paraná
- 2020: Confiança
- 2020: Paysandu
- 2020–2021: Operário Ferroviário
- 2022: Barra-SC
- 2022: Operário Ferroviário
- 2023: Santo André
- 2023: Floresta
- 2024: Ferroviário
- 2024: FC Cascavel
- 2024–2025: Ypiranga-RS
- 2025–2026: Guarani
- 2026–: Inter de Limeira

Matheus Silva Ferreira da Costa (born 14 January 1987) is a Brazilian football coach. He is the current head coach of Inter de Limeira.

== Career ==
Born in Curitiba, Costa played futsal at Paraná but retired at early age. He subsequently worked at Atlético Paranaense, Coritiba and Internacional before joining Levir Culpi's staff at Fluminense in 2016.

On 7 January 2017, Costa was named Wagner Lopes' assistant at Paraná. In July, after Lopes and Cristian de Souza were both sacked, he acted as an interim during a 4–1 Série B home routing of Brasil de Pelotas; after the arrival of Lisca, he returned to his previous role.

On 2 September 2017, Lisca was sacked after altercations with the club's board and supposedly assaulting Costa; he was later named interim manager. Late in the month, he was named permanent manager until the end of the year, and achieved promotion to the Série A.

Costa still left the club after his contract expired, and was appointed manager of Joinville on 13 March 2018; exactly two months later, he was sacked. On 13 August, he was named Tcheco's assistant at Coritiba.

In 2019, Costa also acted as interim at Coxa on two occasions, both after the dismissal of Argel Fucks. On 3 April of that year, he returned to Paraná, replacing sacked Dado Cavalcanti. He left the club at the end of the year, and took over Confiança on 16 February.

Costa was sacked by Dragão on 16 September 2020, being subsequently replaced by Daniel Paulista, and took over Paysandu in the Série C two days later. On 21 October, he replaced longtime incumbent Gerson Gusmão at the helm of Operário Ferroviário in the second division.

Costa was sacked by Operário on 29 September 2021, and spent a period in charge of Barra-SC before returning to the club on 26 July 2022. On 24 October, after the club's relegation, he left.

On 22 February 2023, Costa took over Santo André. He left the club on 28 July, after the elimination in the 2023 Série D, and was named in charge of Série C side Floresta on 9 August.

Released by Floresta on 4 September 2023, Costa was named in charge of fellow third division side Ferroviário sixteen days later, but was sacked on 21 January 2024. He later worked at FC Cascavel before being named Ypiranga-RS head coach on 23 October.

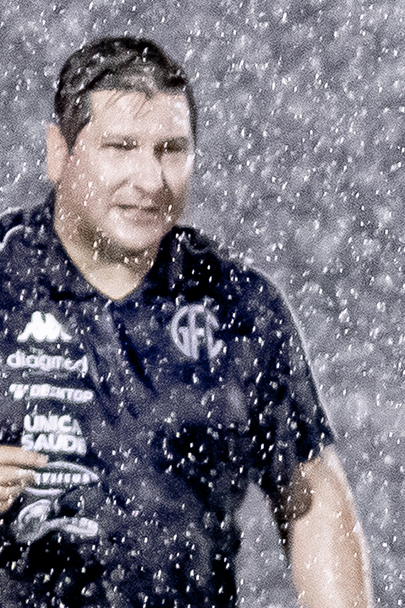
Costa coaching Guarani in 2026

On 27 July 2025, Costa resigned from Ypiranga after accepting an ofter from another third division club, and was announced at Guarani the following day. The following 26 February, after being knocked out in the 2026 Copa do Brasil, he was sacked, and took over Inter de Limeira of the same category on 11 March.

== Honours ==
=== Manager ===
Confiança

- Campeonato Sergipano: 2020

Ypiranga de Erechim

- Troféu Farroupilha: 2025
