= Matheus Costa =

Matheus Costa may refer to:

- Matheus Costa (football manager) (born 1987), Brazilian football coach
- Matheus Costa (footballer) (born 1995), Brazilian footballer
