= João Burse =

Brazilian footballer and coach (born 1982)

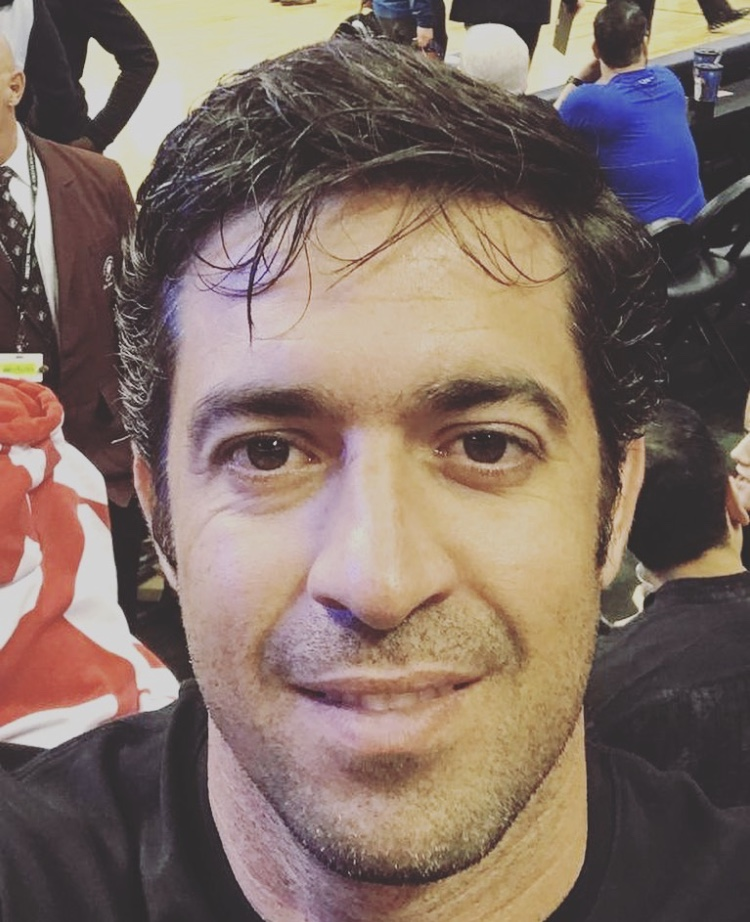
- Burse in 2020

Personal information
- Full name: João Batista Donizete Dressler Burse
- Date of birth: 10 June 1982 (age 44)
- Place of birth: Estiva Gerbi, Brazil
- Position: Centre-back

Team information
- Current team: ABC (head coach)

Youth career
- Mogi Mirim

Senior career*
| Years | Team | Apps | (Gls) |
| 1999–2002 | Mogi Mirim | | |
- Nagoya Grampus
- Corinthians Alagoano
- União Barbarense
- Universidad Católica

Managerial career
- 2010–2014: Mogi Mirim (youth)
- 2014–2015: Vitória U17
- 2015–2017: Palmeiras U20
- 2017–2018: Vitória U20
- 2018–2019: Vitória U23
- 2018: Vitória (interim)
- 2018: Vitória (interim)
- 2019: Vitória (interim)
- 2020–2022: Cianorte
- 2022–2023: Vitória
- 2023: Tombense
- 2024: Figueirense
- 2025: Botafogo-PB
- 2025–2026: Porto Vitória
- 2027–: ABC
- * Club domestic league appearances and goals

João Batista Donizete Dressler Burse (born 10 June 1982) is a Brazilian professional football coach and former player who played as a centre-back. He is the current head coach of ABC.

A central defender, Burse spent most of his playing career in Brazil, as well as brief spells in Japan and Chile.

== Playing career ==
Born in Estiva Gerbi, São Paulo, Burse was a Mogi Mirim youth graduate. Promoted to the first team in 1999, he played for the club until 2002, and subsequently represented Nagoya Grampus, Corinthians Alagoano, União Barbarense and the under-23 side of Universidad Católica. He retired at the age of 24 due to a serious pubis injury.

== Coaching career ==
After retiring, Burse joined his first club Mogi Mirim as a fitness coach of the under-15s. He was later appointed head coach of the category, and subsequently was in charge of the under-20s.

On 29 January 2014, Burse was appointed head coach of Vitória's under-17 squad. On 17 September of the following year, he was named at the helm of Palmeiras' under-20 team.

Sacked by Verdão on 16 May 2017, Burse returned to Vitória on 20 September and took over the under-20s. Ahead of the 2018 campaign, he was also at the helm of the under-23s.

On 31 July 2018, after Vágner Mancini's dismissal, Burse was named interim coach of the main squad. He returned to his previous role on 14 August, after the appointment of Paulo César Carpegiani.

On 6 November 2018, Burse was again named interim for the remaining six matches of the season, replacing sacked Carpegiani. After the club's relegation, he returned to his previous role.

On 22 October 2019, Burse was named head coach of Cianorte for the upcoming campaign. He left the club on 22 March 2022, and returned to Vitória on 19 June, now named first team coach of the side in the Série C.

Burse led Vitória to promotion in the 2022 Série B, but was dismissed on 5 February 2023 after a poor start into the new season. On 8 June 2023, he was named in charge of Tombense also in the second tier, but was sacked on 21 August.

On 28 November 2023, Burse was named head coach of Figueirense for the upcoming season. He left the club on 30 August of the following year, after being eliminated from the 2024 Série C, and took over fellow league team Botafogo-PB on 3 November 2024.

Burse was sacked by Belo on 2 April 2025, after losing the Campeonato Paraibano to Sousa. In May, he was appointed in charge of Porto Vitória, and led the club to their first-ever Campeonato Capixaba the following year.

On 3 September 2026, Burse was announced as head coach of ABC for the upcoming season.

== Honours ==
=== Coach ===
Mogi Mirim U20

- Campeonato Paulista Sub-20: 2013

Vitória U17

- Campeonato Baiano Sub-17: 2015
- Copa do Brasil Sub-17: 2015

Vitória U20

- Copa do Nordeste Sub-20: 2017

Porto Vitória

- Campeonato Capixaba: 2026
