= Lisca (football manager) =

Brazilian football manager

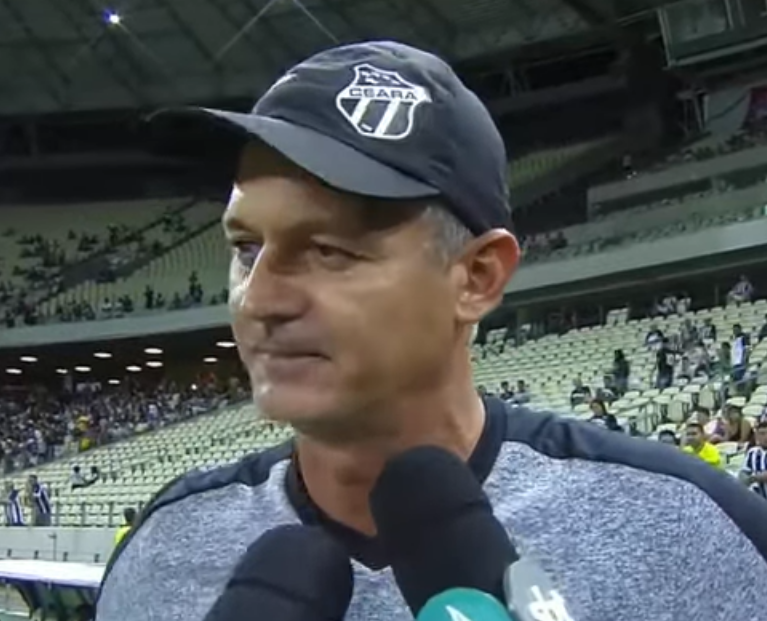
- Lisca as manager of Ceará in 2019

Personal information
- Full name: Luiz Carlos Cirne Lima de Lorenzi
- Date of birth: 11 August 1972 (age 54)
- Place of birth: Porto Alegre, Brazil
- Height: 1.88 m (6 ft 2 in)
- Position: Forward

Youth career
- Years: Team
- Internacional

Managerial career
- 1990–1994: Internacional (youth)
- 1995: São Paulo (youth)
- 1996–2000: Internacional (youth)
- 2001: Ulbra
- 2005: Grêmio (youth)
- 2005: Fluminense (youth)
- 2006–2007: Internacional (youth)
- 2007: Internacional B
- 2008: Brasil de Pelotas
- 2008: Juventude B
- 2009–2010: Porto Alegre
- 2010: Luverdense
- 2010–2011: Caxias
- 2011: Luverdense
- 2012: Novo Hamburgo
- 2012–2013: Juventude
- 2014: Náutico
- 2014: Sampaio Corrêa
- 2015: Náutico
- 2015–2016: Ceará
- 2016: Joinville
- 2016: Internacional
- 2017: Paraná
- 2017: Guarani
- 2018: Criciúma
- 2018–2019: Ceará
- 2020–2021: América Mineiro
- 2021: Vasco da Gama
- 2022: Sport Recife
- 2022: Santos
- 2022: Avaí
- 2023: Vila Nova
- 2024: América Mineiro
- 2026: Botafogo-PB

Luiz Carlos Cirne Lima de Lorenzi (born 11 August 1972), commonly known as Lisca, is a Brazilian football coach.

He is often referred as Lisca Doido (Crazy Lisca or Mad Lisca in Portuguese) due to his extravagant celebrations.

== Career ==
Born in Porto Alegre, Lisca played as a forward for Internacional's youth setup before retiring at the age of 17 due to studies. He started his coaching career in the very same club, joining as coach of their youth categories in 1990. In 1995, he moved to São Paulo, again assigned to the youth categories, but returned to his previous club the following year.

Lisca's first experience as first team trainer came in 2001, with Ulbra. After being dismissed, he returned to the youth setup and took over Grêmio and Fluminense before returning to Inter in 2006. He was also in charge of the latter's first team during the first five matches of the 2007 Campeonato Gaúcho, as the club opted to use a B-team in the tournament.

In February 2008, Lisca was appointed Brasil de Pelotas head coach. He was named trainer of Juventude's B-team in the same year.

After managing Porto Alegre, Luverdense (two stints), Caxias and Novo Hamburgo, Lisca returned to Juventude on 30 July 2012. He left the club in December of the following year, being appointed at the helm of Série B club Náutico.

Lisca resigned from Timbu on 7 May 2014, and joined Sampaio Corrêa on 22 July. He was sacked from the latter on 20 October, after being heavily criticised by the media due to the club's poor performances.

Lisca returned to Náutico in March 2015, being dismissed on 8 September. Late in the month he was appointed in charge of Ceará, seriously threatened with relegation to Série C. After managing to avoid the drop, he renewed his contract for the following season on 30 November.

On 28 March 2016 Lisca was sacked by Ceará, after a poor run of form. On 29 June he was appointed Joinville head coach, being sacked on 16 September.

On 18 November 2016, Internacional announced Lisca as their new head coach, with the club having only three games in hand and being in the relegation zone. He left the club after failing to avoid the club's first-ever relegation to the second division, being replaced by Antônio Carlos Zago.

On 18 July 2017, Lisca was appointed Paraná head coach, but was dismissed on 2 September after altercations with the club's board and supposedly assaulting the club's assistant coach Matheus Costa. On 8 October he was named at the helm of Guarani, leaving the club in the end of the year.

On 10 December 2017, Lisca was named Criciúma head coach, but resigned the following 29 January after just four matches. On 4 June 2018, he returned to Ceará in the place of departing Jorginho.

On 22 April 2019, after losing the year's Campeonato Cearense, Lisca was sacked. The following 30 January, he replaced Red Bull Bragantino-bound Felipe Conceição at the helm of América Mineiro. He led the Coelho to the semifinals of the 2020 Copa do Brasil, while also achieving promotion from the 2020 Série B.

On 14 June 2021, after seven winless matches, Lisca resigned. On 20 July, he replaced Marcelo Cabo at the helm of Vasco da Gama in the second division, but resigned on 8 September after 12 matches.

On 27 June 2022, Lisca was named head coach of second division side Sport Recife. On 19 July, after just four matches in charge, he left the club to take over Santos in the top tier.

On 12 September 2022, Lisca left Santos on a mutual agreement, and was named head coach of fellow top tier side Avaí the following day. He was sacked from the latter side on 24 October, after six straight losses in seven matches.

On 21 September 2023, after nearly one year without a club, Lisca took over Vila Nova in division two. He only lasted four matches, being dismissed less than a month later.

On 28 August 2024, Lisca returned to América. He left by mutual consent on 19 November, after the club's mathematically missed out promotion.

On 2 February 2026, after more than a year without a club, Lisca was appointed head coach of Botafogo-PB. On 28 April, after just 16 matches, he was sacked.

== Personal life ==
Lisca's great grandfather Carlos de Lorenzi and his grandfather Jorge de Lorenzi were both goalkeepers for Internacional in the 1910s and in the 1940s, respectively. His brother Jorge de Lorenzi Neto also works with football, as an assistant coach.

== Coaching statistics ==
As of 29 April 2026

Coaching record by team and tenure
Team	Nat.	From	To	Record								Ref
Team	Nat.	From	To	G	W	D	L	GF	GA	GD	Win %	Ref
Internacional B	(Brazil)	1 January 2007	4 February 2007	5	1	1	3	5	9	−4	20.00	
Brasil de Pelotas	(Brazil)	12 February 2008	27 April 2008	8	4	1	3	14	11	+3	50.00	
Porto Alegre	(Brazil)	1 March 2009	26 January 2010	37	19	10	8	62	40	+22	51.35	
Luverdense	(Brazil)	22 April 2010	7 November 2010	10	4	2	4	14	11	+3	40.00	
Caxias	(Brazil)	9 November 2010	10 March 2011	12	7	3	2	22	8	+14	58.33	
Luverdense	(Brazil)	21 April 2011	21 November 2011	23	12	5	6	38	16	+22	52.17	
Novo Hamburgo	(Brazil)	13 March 2012	30 July 2012	5	2	2	1	5	9	−4	40.00	
Juventude	(Brazil)	30 July 2012	13 December 2013	68	34	16	18	84	55	+29	50.00	
Náutico	(Brazil)	13 December 2013	7 May 2014	26	10	7	9	25	28	−3	38.46	
Sampaio Corrêa	(Brazil)	22 July 2014	20 October 2014	18	5	10	3	25	22	+3	27.78	
Náutico	(Brazil)	6 March 2015	8 September 2015	35	15	8	12	40	41	−1	42.86	
Ceará	(Brazil)	30 September 2015	28 March 2016	28	18	5	5	47	17	+30	64.29	
Joinville	(Brazil)	29 June 2016	16 September 2016	12	3	4	5	9	12	−3	25.00	
Internacional	(Brazil)	18 November 2016	11 December 2016	3	1	1	1	2	2	+0	33.33	
Paraná	(Brazil)	18 July 2017	2 September 2017	8	4	3	1	14	5	+9	50.00	
Guarani	(Brazil)	8 October 2017	29 November 2017	8	1	4	3	6	8	−2	12.50	
Criciúma	(Brazil)	10 December 2017	29 January 2018	4	1	1	2	2	4	−2	25.00	
Ceará	(Brazil)	4 June 2018	22 April 2019	54	21	20	13	45	35	+10	38.89	
América Mineiro	(Brazil)	30 January 2020	14 June 2021	82	40	27	15	92	58	+34	48.78	
Vasco da Gama	(Brazil)	20 July 2021	8 September 2021	12	4	1	7	13	17	−4	33.33	
Sport Recife	(Brazil)	27 June 2022	19 July 2022	4	1	3	0	2	0	+2	25.00	
Santos	(Brazil)	20 July 2022	12 September 2022	8	2	3	3	7	8	−1	25.00	
Avaí	(Brazil)	13 September 2022	24 October 2022	7	1	0	6	3	16	−13	14.29	
Vila Nova	(Brazil)	21 September 2023	20 October 2023	4	1	2	1	5	4	+1	25.00	
América Mineiro	(Brazil)	28 August 2024	19 November 2024	14	6	2	6	20	16	+4	42.86	
Botafogo-PB	(Brazil)	2 February 2026	28 April 2026	16	7	5	4	20	14	+6	43.75	
Career total				504	220	145	139	617	461	+156	43.65	—

== Honours ==
Porto Alegre

- Campeonato Gaúcho Série A2: 2009

Luverdense

- Copa FMF: 2011

Juventude

- Copa FGF: 2012

Botafogo-PB

- Campeonato Paraibano: 2026
