= China Balbino =

Brazilian footballer and coach (born 1979)

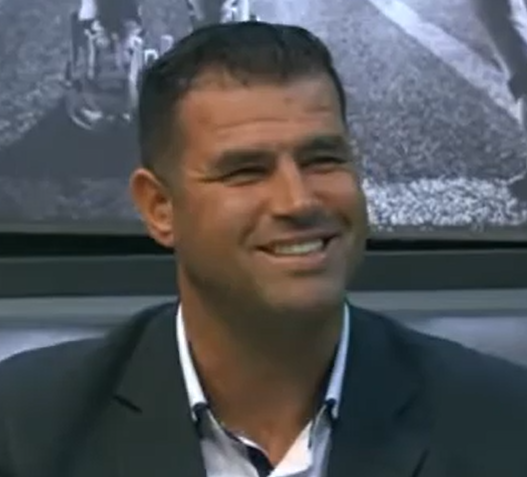
- Balbino in 2017

Personal information
- Full name: Jeverson Wilson Walter Balbino
- Date of birth: 20 June 1979 (age 47)
- Place of birth: Itaboraí, Brazil
- Position: Centre back

Team information
- Current team: Monsoon

Youth career
- Internacional

Senior career*
Years	Team	Apps	(Gls)
2000	Rio-Grandense	24	(0)
2001	São Luiz-RS	10	(0)
2001	Sapiranga	8	(0)
2002–2003	Ulbra	2	(0)
2003	Sapiranga	17	(1)
2003	Lami	10	(3)
2004	Santa Cruz-RS	25	(3)
2004	Bagé	7	(0)
2004	Sapiranga	0	(0)
2005	Santa Cruz-RS	5	(1)
2006	Sapucaiense		
2007	Lajeadense		
2008	Ypiranga-RS		
2009	14 de Julho		
2009	Iraty		
2010	Imbituba	1	(0)
2011	Sapucaiense		

Managerial career
- 2011: Caxias-SC U17
- 2011: Caxias-SC U20
- 2011: Caxias-SC
- 2011–2012: Chapecoense (assistant)
- 2012–2014: Cruzeiro-RS (assistant)
- 2014: São José-RS (assistant)
- 2015–2017: São José-RS
- 2018: Glória
- 2018: Atlético Tubarão
- 2019: Hercílio Luz
- 2019: Avenida
- 2020: São Paulo-RS
- 2020: São José-RS
- 2021: São Paulo-RS
- 2023: Aimoré
- 2024: São José-RS
- 2025–: Monsoon
- * Club domestic league appearances and goals

Jeverson Wilson Walter Balbino (born 20 June 1979), known as China Balbino, is a Brazilian football coach and former player who played as a central defender.

== Honours ==
=== Player ===
Ulbra

- Campeonato Gaúcho Série A2: 2002
