= Marcelo Cabo =

Brazilian professional football coach

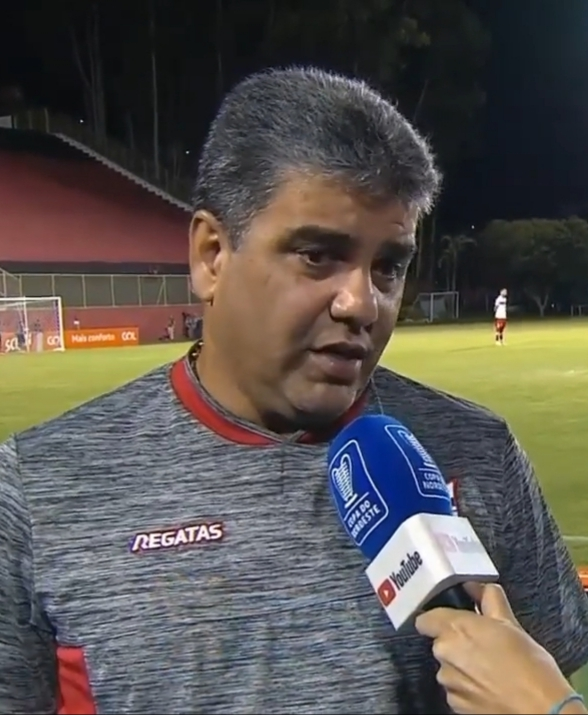
- Cabo as head coach of CRB in 2020

Personal information
- Full name: Marcelo Ribeiro Cabo
- Date of birth: 6 December 1966 (age 59)
- Place of birth: Rio de Janeiro, Brazil
- Position: Defensive midfielder

Youth career
- Fluminense
- Vasco da Gama
- Portuguesa-RJ
- Olaria

Senior career*
| Years | Team | Apps | (Gls) |
- Tio Sam (futsal)
- America-RJ (futsal)
- Valencia (futsal)
- Flamengo (futsal)
| 19XX–1998 | Fluminense (futsal) | | |

Managerial career
- 1998: Fluminense (futsal)
- 1999–2002: Olaria (futsal)
- 1999–2002: Olaria (youth)
- 2003: Madureira U20
- 2003: Flamengo (futsal)
- 2004: Bangu
- 2004: São Bento-MA
- 2004–2005: Al-Hilal U17
- 2005–2006: Saudi Arabia (assistant)
- 2007: Cabofriense
- 2007: Bonsucesso
- 2008: CFZ do Rio
- 2008: Atlético Tubarão
- 2009: Atlético Tubarão
- 2009–2010: Al-Nasr
- 2010: Goiás (assistant)
- 2010–2011: Al-Arabi
- 2011: Figueirense (assistant)
- 2012: Dibba Al-Fujairah
- 2013: Tombense
- 2013: Ponte Preta (assistant)
- 2014: Nacional-MG
- 2014: Al Wasl (assistant)
- 2015: Volta Redonda
- 2015: Macaé
- 2015: Ceará
- 2016: Tigres do Brasil
- 2016: Resende
- 2016–2017: Atlético Goianiense
- 2017: Figueirense
- 2017: Guarani
- 2018: Resende
- 2018–2019: CSA
- 2019: Vila Nova
- 2019–2020: CRB
- 2020–2021: Atlético Goianiense
- 2021: Vasco da Gama
- 2021: Goiás
- 2021–2022: Atlético Goianiense
- 2022: CRB
- 2022: Chapecoense
- 2023: Remo
- 2023: CSA
- 2024: CSA
- 2024: ABC
- 2024: Floresta
- 2024: Brusque
- 2025: Água Santa
- 2025–2026: Santa Cruz
- 2026: Caxias
- * Club domestic league appearances and goals

Marcelo Ribeiro Cabo (born 6 December 1966) is a Brazilian professional football coach.

== Career ==
Born in Rio de Janeiro, Cabo played as a defensive midfielder, representing Fluminense, Vasco da Gama, Portuguesa-RJ and Olaria as a youth. He subsequently switched to futsal, notably representing Valencia CF.

In 1998, while at Fluminense's futsal team, Cabo retired and immediately became the side's trainer. He moved to Olaria in the following year, being also in charge of the club's football youth squads.

In 2003, Cabo was in charge of Madureira's under-20 team, whilst also taking over Flamengo's futsal team. In December of that year, he was named head coach of Bangu.

Cabo was in charge for 13 official matches, achieving only one win and suffering relegation from the 2004 Campeonato Carioca. On 15 April of that year, he was named at the helm of São Bento-MA, taking the club to the finals of the second round of the Campeonato Maranhense, finishing fourth overall.

Cabo moved abroad in late 2004, taking over Al-Hilal's under-17 side. In the following year, he was named Marcos Paquetá's assistant at the helm of Saudi Arabia national team, and took part of the 2006 FIFA World Cup.

Upon returning to Brazil, Cabo coached Cabofriense and Bonsucesso during the 2007 campaign. In 2008 he took over CFZ do Rio, and moved to Atlético Tubarão late in the year after a partnership with his previous club CFZ was established; he returned to Tubarão on 15 December 2008, but left the following 5 February.

On 29 July 2009, Cabo took over Kuwait's Al-Nasr. He also acted as Dunga's technical scout during the 2010 FIFA World Cup, and later joined Jorginho (Dunga's assistant during the World Cup) at Goiás and Figueirense.

In 2012, Cabo managed Emirati side Dibba Al-Fujairah, being sacked on 23 October of that year. On 16 December, he was appointed head coach of Tombense, but resigned on 9 May 2013.

On 28 January 2014, after another work as Jorginho's assistant (at Ponte Preta), Cabo was named in charge of Nacional de Nova Serrana. He later joined Jorginho's staff at Al Wasl, again as an assistant, staying for six months before being presented at Volta Redonda on 1 December 2014.

On 23 March 2015, Cabo resigned from Volta Redonda and took over Macaé Esporte. On 3 August, he departed from the latter club and was named at the helm of Ceará, but was subsequently replaced by Lisca.

On 8 October 2015, Cabo was appointed head coach of Tigres do Brasil for the 2016 season. He resigned from the club the following 27 February, and took over Resende on 2 March.

On 8 May 2016, Cabo was presented at Atlético Goianiense. He managed to achieve promotion to the Série A at the end of the year as champions, but in January 2017, he was reported missing in Goiânia for more than 40 hours. It was later revealed that he consumed too much alcoholic drinks and overslept in a motel.

Maintained in charge of the club after the occurrence, Cabo resigned on 5 June 2017, after four defeats in four league matches. He also managed Figueirense and Guarani in the remainder of the year, never lasting more than two months.

On 22 December 2017, Cabo returned to Resende, but left the club the following 18 February after accepting an offer from CSA. With the latter side he achieved top tier promotion, and renewed his contract on 29 November.

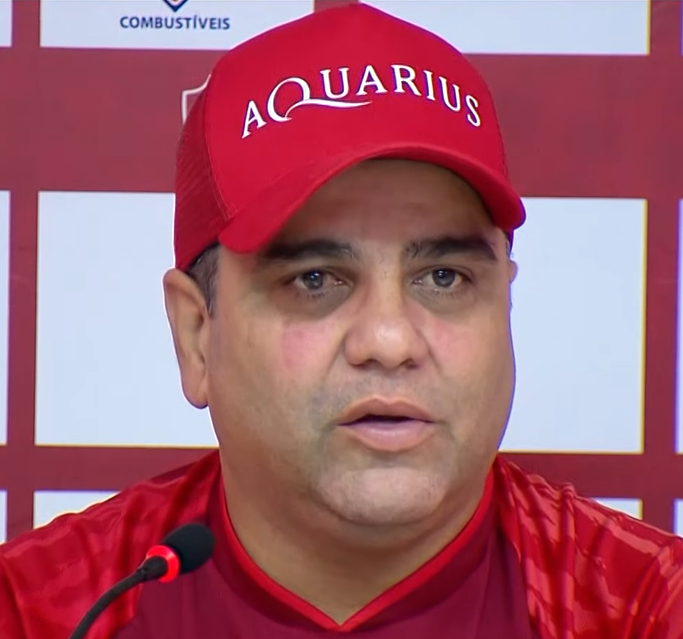
Cabo being presented as head coach of Vila Nova in 2019

Cabo was fired from CSA on 30 June 2019, and was announced as new head coach of Vila Nova of the second level on 14 July. On 3 October, after only four wins in 17 matches, he was relieved of his duties; the club suffered relegation nonetheless.

Cabo was appointed in charge of second division side CRB on 12 October 2019. On 7 November of the following year, he left the club after accepting an offer from Atlético Goianiense in the top tier.

On 27 February 2021, hours after winning the 2020 Campeonato Goiano, Cabo was named head coach of Vasco da Gama, recently relegated to division two. He was sacked by the Cruzmaltino on 19 July, and took over fellow second division side Goiás the following day.

On 28 October 2021, despite being in the promotion places of the second division, Cabo was dismissed by Goiás. On 11 November, he returned to Atlético Goianiense for a third spell, but resigned on 7 February 2022, with only four matches into the new season.

On 10 February 2022, Cabo returned to CRB for a second spell as head coach. He left on 14 May, with the club in the last position of the second division, and took over fellow league team Chapecoense on 7 July.

On 30 August 2022, Cabo was sacked by Chape after only ten matches. On 24 October, he was announced in charge of Remo for the ensuing campaign.

Cabo left Remo on a mutual agreement on 23 May 2023, after a poor start in the 2023 Série C, and returned to CSA on 21 June, with the club now also in the third level. After leaving the club at the end of the season, he returned on 22 January 2024, replacing sacked Rogério Corrêa, but was sacked on 3 March after the club's elimination from the 2024 Campeonato Alagoano.

Seven days after his dismissal from CSA, Cabo was named in charge of fellow third division side ABC, but was sacked from the club on 27 April 2024. Nine days after that, he was named head coach of Floresta also in division three.

On 9 September 2024, Cabo returned to division two after appointed at the helm of Brusque. Unable to prevent relegation, he left the club on 25 November, and took over Água Santa just hours later. At the latter club, he only lasted three matches.

On 2 April 2025, Cabo was appointed Santa Cruz head coach, and led the club to a promotion to the third division. On 26 January 2026, however, he was sacked, and was named head coach of Caxias five days later.

Cabo was dismissed from Caxias on 17 August 2026, two matches before the end of the first stage.

== Coaching statistics ==
As of 30 August 2022.

Coaching record by team and tenure
| Team | Nat | From | To | Record | | | | | | | | Ref |
| Team | Nat | From | To | G | W | D | L | GF | GA | GD | Win % | Ref |
|---|---|---|---|---|---|---|---|---|---|---|---|---|
| Bangu | (Brazil) | January 2004 | 15 April 2004 | 13 | 1 | 3 | 9 | 11 | 25 | −14 | 7.69 | |
| São Bento-MA | (Brazil) | 15 April 2004 | September 2004 | 22 | 10 | 4 | 8 | 20 | 19 | +1 | 45.45 | |
| Cabofriense | (Brazil) | 18 May 2007 | 24 June 2007 | 2 | 1 | 0 | 1 | 2 | 1 | +1 | 50.00 | |
| Bonsucesso | (Brazil) | August 2007 | 27 September 2007 | 10 | 3 | 5 | 2 | 14 | 12 | +2 | 30.00 | |
| CFZ do Rio | (Brazil) | 3 July 2008 | October 2008 | 24 | 11 | 4 | 9 | 29 | 23 | +6 | 45.83 | |
| Atlético Tubarão | (Brazil) | October 2008 | November 2008 | 4 | 0 | 0 | 4 | 5 | 14 | −9 | 0.00 | |
| Atlético Tubarão | (Brazil) | 15 December 2008 | 5 February 2009 | 6 | 1 | 1 | 4 | 4 | 13 | −9 | 16.67 | |
| Dibba Al-Fujairah | (United Arab Emirates) | July 2012 | 23 October 2012 | 6 | 0 | 1 | 5 | 6 | 21 | −15 | 0.00 | |
| Tombense | (Brazil) | 16 December 2012 | 9 May 2013 | 13 | 6 | 1 | 6 | 17 | 19 | −2 | 46.15 | |
| Nacional de Nova Serrana | (Brazil) | 28 January 2014 | 17 March 2014 | 11 | 3 | 1 | 7 | 10 | 17 | −7 | 27.27 | |
| Volta Redonda | (Brazil) | 28 November 2014 | 23 March 2015 | 11 | 5 | 3 | 3 | 13 | 12 | +1 | 45.45 | |
| Macaé | (Brazil) | 23 March 2015 | 3 August 2015 | 20 | 7 | 7 | 6 | 30 | 28 | +2 | 35.00 | |
| Ceará | (Brazil) | 3 August 2015 | 29 September 2015 | 15 | 5 | 3 | 7 | 19 | 23 | −4 | 33.33 | |
| Tigres do Brasil | (Brazil) | 8 October 2015 | 27 February 2016 | 7 | 0 | 1 | 6 | 5 | 17 | −12 | 0.00 | |
| Resende | (Brazil) | 2 March 2016 | 4 May 2016 | 12 | 6 | 3 | 3 | 19 | 15 | +4 | 50.00 | |
| Atlético Goianiense | (Brazil) | 8 May 2016 | 5 June 2017 | 60 | 28 | 16 | 16 | 83 | 63 | +20 | 46.67 | |
| Figueirense | (Brazil) | 15 June 2017 | 29 July 2017 | 10 | 2 | 2 | 6 | 11 | 16 | −5 | 20.00 | |
| Guarani | (Brazil) | 29 August 2017 | 8 October 2017 | 6 | 0 | 3 | 3 | 3 | 11 | −8 | 0.00 | |
| Resende | (Brazil) | 22 December 2017 | 17 February 2018 | 9 | 3 | 2 | 4 | 13 | 15 | −2 | 33.33 | |
| CSA | (Brazil) | 18 February 2018 | 30 June 2019 | 79 | 32 | 25 | 22 | 92 | 73 | +19 | 40.51 | |
| Vila Nova | (Brazil) | 14 July 2019 | 3 October 2019 | 17 | 4 | 7 | 6 | 12 | 16 | −4 | 23.53 | |
| CRB | (Brazil) | 12 October 2019 | 7 November 2020 | 53 | 21 | 15 | 17 | 64 | 58 | +6 | 39.62 | |
| Atlético Goianiense | (Brazil) | 7 November 2020 | 27 February 2021 | 22 | 10 | 7 | 5 | 31 | 22 | +9 | 45.45 | |
| Vasco da Gama | (Brazil) | 27 February 2021 | 19 July 2021 | 29 | 13 | 10 | 6 | 42 | 31 | +11 | 44.83 | |
| Goiás | (Brazil) | 20 July 2021 | 28 October 2021 | 19 | 8 | 6 | 5 | 25 | 20 | +5 | 42.11 | |
| Atlético Goianiense | (Brazil) | 11 November 2021 | 7 February 2022 | 12 | 6 | 4 | 2 | 14 | 9 | +5 | 50.00 | |
| CRB | (Brazil) | 10 February 2022 | 14 May 2022 | 23 | 8 | 4 | 11 | 21 | 29 | −8 | 34.78 | |
| Chapecoense | (Brazil) | 7 July 2022 | 30 August 2022 | 10 | 2 | 5 | 3 | 7 | 8 | −1 | 20.00 | |
| CSA | (Brazil) | 27 June 2023 | 21 September 2023 | 10 | 2 | 5 | 3 | 7 | 7 | +0 | 20.00 | |
| CSA | (Brazil) | 23 January 2024 | 4 March 2024 | 9 | 2 | 2 | 5 | 14 | 13 | +1 | 22.22 | |
| Total | | | | 544 | 200 | 150 | 194 | 642 | 650 | −8 | 36.76 | — |

== Honours ==
=== Futsal ===
Olaria

- Campeonato Carioca de Futsal: 2002

Flamengo

- Campeonato Carioca de Futsal: 2003

=== Football ===
Atlético Goianiense

- Campeonato Brasileiro Série B: 2016
- Campeonato Goiano: 2020

CSA

- Campeonato Alagoano: 2018, 2019

Vasco da Gama

- Taça Rio: 2021

CRB

- Campeonato Alagoano: 2020, 2022
