= Denilson (footballer, born 1998) =

Brazilian footballer

Personal information
- Full name: Denilson da Silva dos Santos
- Date of birth: 7 March 1998 (age 28)
- Place of birth: João Câmara, Brazil
- Height: 1.90 m (6 ft 3 in)
- Position: Forward

Team information
- Current team: Ferroviária (on loan from Rio Claro)

Youth career
- –2015: América-RN

Senior career*
Years	Team	Apps	(Gls)
2016	América-RN	0	(0)
2016	Visão Celeste	3	(0)
2017–2020	Santa Cruz (N)	13	(4)
2018	→ Campinense (loan)	5	(4)
2018	→ Atlético Goianiense (loan)	11	(0)
2019	→ Tombense (loan)	8	(1)
2019–2020	→ Boa Esporte (loan)	7	(0)
2020	Nacional de Patos	2	(0)
2020–	Rio Claro	45	(14)
2020	→ União Barbarense (loan)	8	(4)
2021	→ Manaus (loan)	14	(3)
2022	→ Água Santa (loan)	1	(0)
2022	→ Chungbuk Cheongju (loan)	7	(1)
2023	→ Seongnam (loan)	20	(3)
2024	→ Athletic (loan)	21	(8)
2025	→ Botafogo-PB (loan)	18	(4)
2025	→ Paysandu (loan)	7	(0)
2026–	→ Ferroviária (loan)	7	(2)
- * Club domestic league appearances and goals as of 9 November 2026

Denilson da Silva dos Santos (born 7 March 1998), simply known as Denilson, is a Brazilian professional footballer who plays as a forward for Ferroviária, on loan from Rio Claro.

== Career ==
Revealed by América de Natal, Denilson played most of his career in clubs in the northeast region. He arrived at Rio Claro in 2020, and on loan played for teams in South Korea. In 2024, he stood out for Athletic-MG in the runner-up campaign of the Brasileiro Série C.

In the 2025 season, after playing in the Campeonato Paulista Série A2 with Rio Claro, Denilson was again loaned, this time to Botafogo-PB and in September to Paysandu.
