= Cícero Júnior =

Brazilian football manager

Personal information
- Full name: Cícero Moacir Martins Júnior
- Date of birth: 11 February 1980 (age 46)
- Place of birth: São João del-Rei, Brazil

Team information
- Current team: Rio Branco-ES (head coach)

Youth career
- Years: Team
- América Mineiro
- Santa Tereza
- Venda Nova
- Athletic-MG

Managerial career
- 2000–2001: Gammonense (youth)
- 2016: Social U17
- 2017: Figueirense-MG U20 (assistant)
- 2018: Athletic-MG U17
- 2018–2019: Athletic-MG
- 2020: Uberlândia U20
- 2020: Uberlândia (interim)
- 2020–2021: Athletic-MG
- 2021: Coimbra U20
- 2021–2022: Villa Nova
- 2022: Coimbra
- 2022: Coimbra B
- 2023: Villa Nova
- 2023: Athletic-MG
- 2024: Gama
- 2024: Pouso Alegre
- 2024: Coimbra
- 2025: Itabirito
- 2025: Azuriz
- 2025: Uberlândia
- 2026–: Rio Branco-ES

Cícero Moacir Martins Júnior (born 11 February 1980), known as Cícero Júnior, is a Brazilian football coach. He is the current head coach of Rio Branco-ES.

== Career ==
Born in São João del-Rei, Minas Gerais, Cícero Júnior played for the youth sides of América Mineiro, Santa Tereza, Venda Nova and Athletic-MG before moving to coaching in 2000, with the youth sides of Gammonense. In 2002, he returned to Athletic and was the club's coach in their youth futsal schools.

In 2009, Cícero Júnior became Athletic's head coach during the club's amateur periods, remaining in the role until 2014. In 2016, he worked in the under-15 and under-17 teams of Social, and was an assistant coach of the under-20 side of Figueirense-MG in the following year.

In 2018, after returning to Athletic to coach their under-17 team, Cícero Júnior was named head coach of the main squad for their return to a professional status in the Campeonato Mineiro Segunda Divisão. He led the club to a promotion after finishing second, and kept the club in the Campeonato Mineiro Módulo II in the following year.

On 14 November 2019, Cícero Júnior was named Uberlândia's under-20 coach. He was named interim head coach of the main squad for one match in the following January, after the dismissal of Felipe Surian, but returned to his previous role after one match.

On 20 August 2020, Athletic announced the return of Cícero Júnior for the year's Mineiro Módulo II. On 21 December, after achieving a first-ever promotion to the Campeonato Mineiro, he renewed his contract, and managed to avoid relegation in the 2021 Mineiro with the club.

In May 2021, Cícero Júnior signed with Coimbra, spending a short period as their under-20 coach before moving to Villa Nova as a head coach, after the latter club established a partnership with the former. He also led Villa to promotion to the Mineiro, now as champions.

After being in charge of Villa Nova during the 2022 Mineiro, Cícero Júnior went back to Coimbra for the Mineiro Módulo II, also taking over their B-team in the Mineiro Segunda División in the same year. On 19 December 2022, he was announced back at Villa Nova for the ensuing campaign.

On 2 April 2023, Cícero Júnior left Villa, and returned to Athletic two days later. In September, he led the club to their first-ever promotion to the Série C, but subsequently left after not renewing his contract.

On 12 October 2023, Cícero Júnior was announced as head coach of Gama.

== Honours ==
Villa Nova

- Campeonato Mineiro Módulo II: 2021
