= Lagoa Seca =

Coordinates: 7.17083°S 35.8539°W

- Municipality
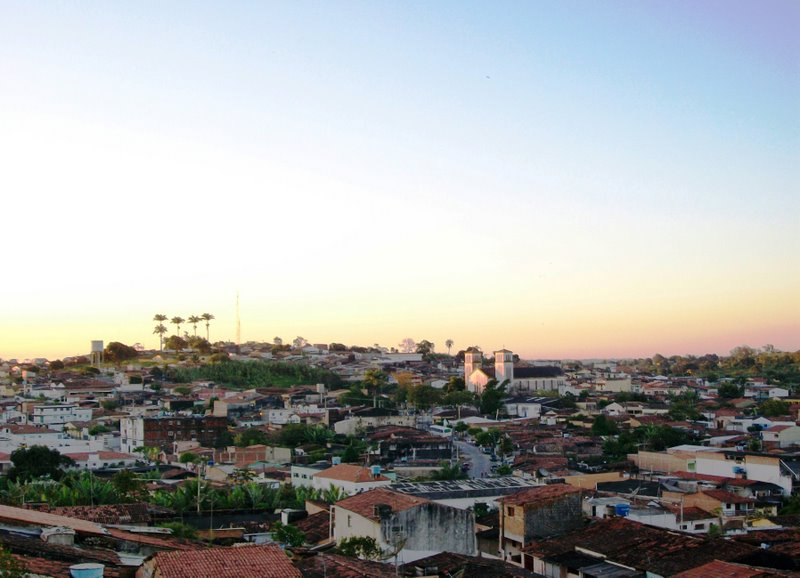
- Lagoa Seca in 2013

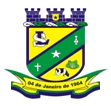
- Flag Coat of arms
- Interactive map of Lagoa Seca
- Country: Brazil
- Region: South
- State: Paraíba
- Mesoregion: Agreste Paraibano

Population (2020)
  - Total: 27,617
- Time zone: UTC−3 (BRT)

Lagoa Seca (Central northeastern portuguese pronunciation: [lɐˈɡoɐ ˈsekɐ]) is a municipality in the state of Paraíba in the Northeast Region of Brazil.

== See also ==
- List of municipalities in Paraíba
