= Rogério Corrêa (footballer, born 1981) =

Brazilian football manager

Personal information
- Full name: Rogério de Albuquerque Corrêa
- Date of birth: 27 March 1981 (age 45)
- Place of birth: Rio de Janeiro, Brazil
- Height: 1.82 m (6 ft 0 in)
- Position: Centre back

Team information
- Current team: Ferroviária (head coach)

Youth career
- 1999–2001: Flamengo

Senior career*
Years	Team	Apps	(Gls)
2001–2002	Bangu	23	(1)
2002–2003	Vasco da Gama	18	(0)
2004	Bangu	9	(0)
2004	Joinville		
2005	15 de Novembro	0	(0)
2005	Brasiliense		
2005–2006	Levadiakos	6	(0)
2006	Angra dos Reis		
2007	Botafogo	0	(0)
2007	Ceará	5	(0)
2007	Bonsucesso		
2008	Anápolis	3	(0)
2009	Uberlândia	2	(1)
2009	Remo	11	(2)
2009	Paysandu	12	(1)
2010	CRB	8	(0)

Managerial career
- 2017: Portuguesa-RJ (assistant)
- 2017: Portuguesa-RJ (interim)
- 2017: Moto Club (assistant)
- 2018: Portuguesa-RJ (assistant)
- 2018: Portuguesa-RJ
- 2019: Portuguesa-RJ (assistant)
- 2019–2020: Portuguesa-RJ
- 2020: Artsul
- 2021: Cabofriense
- 2022: 4 de Julho
- 2022–2023: Volta Redonda
- 2024: CSA
- 2024–2025: Volta Redonda
- 2026–: Ferroviária
- * Club domestic league appearances and goals

Rogério de Albuquerque Corrêa (born 27 March 1981), known as Rogério Corrêa, is a Brazilian football coach and former player who played as a central defender. He is the current head coach of Ferroviária.

== Playing career ==
A Flamengo youth graduate, Corrêa moved to Bangu in 2001, and made his senior debut in the year's Série C. In 2002, he joined Vasco da Gama, and won the 2003 Campeonato Carioca with the club.

Corrêa returned to Bangu in 2004, after featuring rarely for Vasco. He subsequently represented Joinville, 15 de Novembro and Brasiliense before signing for Super League Greece side Levadiakos in August 2005.

Back to Brazil in 2006, Corrêa had a brief stint at Angra dos Reis before agreeing to a contract with Botafogo in December 2006. He left the club on 26 March 2007, after failing to make a single appearance, and signed a one-year deal with Ceará the following day.

After leaving Ceará, Corrêa resumed his career in the lower leagues, playing for Bonsucesso, Anápolis, Uberlândia, Remo, Paysandu (two stints) and CRB. He retired from professional football with the latter in 2010, aged 29, and subsequently played seven-a-side football, being named the best player of the sport in 2013.

== Managerial career ==
After being an assistant manager at Portuguesa-RJ and Moto Club, Corrêa was named manager of the former side on 20 April 2018. He resigned on 3 October 2020, and took over Artsul just four days later.

On 23 December 2020, Corrêa was appointed in charge of Cabofriense for the upcoming season. The following 2 March, after being knocked out in the preliminary stage of the 2021 Campeonato Carioca, he left the club.

On 25 November 2021, Corrêa was named at the helm of 4 de Julho. He opted to leave the club on 21 March of the following year, to take over Volta Redonda.

Corrêa left Voltaço on 10 October 2023, and took over fellow third division side CSA three days later. On 22 January 2024, after just two matches into the new season, he was sacked, and returned to Volta Redonda on 16 February.

Corrêa led Volta Redonda to a promotion to the second division, but suffered immediate relegation, and departed the club on 12 November 2025. On 5 December, he took over Ferroviária for the upcoming season.

== Honours ==
=== Player ===
Vasco

- Campeonato Carioca: 2003

=== Coach ===
Volta Redonda

- Campeonato Carioca Série A2: 2022
- Copa Rio: 2022
- Campeonato Brasileiro Série C: 2024
