= Lucas Silva (footballer, born 1994) =

Brazilian footballer

Personal information
- Full name: Lucas Silva de Oliveira
- Date of birth: 28 April 1994 (age 32)
- Place of birth: Saubara, Brazil
- Height: 1.65 m (5 ft 5 in)
- Position: Forward

Team information
- Current team: Retrô

Senior career*
Years	Team	Apps	(Gls)
2014	América Mineiro	8	(0)
2014–2018	Tombense	12	(0)
2015–2016	→ Santa Clara (loan)	33	(3)
2016	→ Palmas (loan)	4	(1)
2017	→ Rio Preto (loan)	8	(1)
2017	→ Barra-SC (loan)	3	(0)
2018	→ Central (loan)	12	(1)
2018	→ América-RN (loan)	5	(1)
2018	Santa Helena	0	(0)
2019	Anapolina	18	(3)
2019	Jaraguá	6	(0)
2020	Vila Nova	20	(2)
2020	→ Água Santa (loan)	2	(1)
2020–2021	Mirassol	38	(1)
2021	Figueirense		
2022	XV de Piracicaba	9	(0)
2022–2023	Santa Cruz	34	(1)
2023–2024	Amazonas	13	(0)
2024–	Retrô	11	(0)
- * Club domestic league appearances and goals as of 20:06, 31 October 2024 (UTC)

Lucas Silva de Oliveira (born 28 April 1994), known as Lucas Silva, is a Brazilian professional footballer who plays as a forward for Brazilian club Retrô.

== Honours ==
Tombense

- Campeonato Brasileiro Série D: 2014

Santa Clara

- AF Ponta Delgada Taça S. Miguel: 2015–16

Jaraguá

- Campeonato Goiano - Segunda Divisão: 2019

Mirassol

- Campeonato Brasileiro Série D: 2020
