= Rodrigo Limiro =

Brazilian footballer

Personal information
- Full name: Rodrigo Limiro Gomes da Silva
- Date of birth: 16 April 1984 (age 42)
- Place of birth: Goiânia, Brazil
- Position: Midfielder

Youth career
- Goiás

Senior career*
Years	Team	Apps	(Gls)
- Novo Horizonte
- Rio Branco-SP
2008–2009	Alcampell		
2010–2011	Alcampell	12	(2)

Managerial career
- 2015–2018: Aparecidense U15
- 2018–2021: Aparecidense U17
- 2021–2022: Aparecidense U20
- 2022: ABD
- 2023: Aparecidense U20
- 2024: Aparecidense
- * Club domestic league appearances and goals

Rodrigo Limiro Gomes da Silva (born 16 April 1984), known as Rodrigo Limiro, is a Brazilian football coach and former player who played as a midfielder.

== Playing career ==
Born in Goiânia, Goiás, Limiro was a Goiás youth graduate. He represented Novo Horizonte and Rio Branco-SP before moving abroad, playing for Portuguese clubs and Spanish side UD Alcampell on two occasions.

== Coaching career ==
After retiring, Limiro joined Aparecidense in 2015, being a coach of the under-15, under-17 and under-20 categories over the years. On 6 September 2022, he was named head coach of ABD in the Campeonato Goiano Terceira Divisão.

Limiro left ABD after the season ended, recording two draws and two losses, and subsequently returned to Aparecidense and their under-20 team. On 2 December 2023, he was named head coach of the main squad for the upcoming campaign.

On 8 February 2024, after only one win in seven matches, Limiro was sacked by Aparecidense.
