= Cristian de Souza =

Brazilian football coach (born 1977)

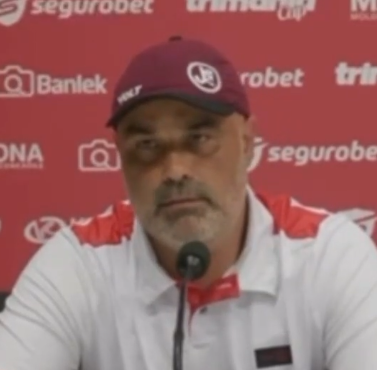
- Cristian de Souza in 2026

Personal information
- Full name: Cristian Ziani de Souza
- Date of birth: 6 October 1977 (age 49)
- Place of birth: Quaraí, Brazil

Managerial career
- Years: Team
- 2001–2004: Esportivo (youth)
- 2005–2008: Esportivo (assistant)
- 2008–2009: Veranópolis (assistant)
- 2009: Pelotas (assistant)
- 2010: Grêmio U17
- 2010–2011: Grêmio U20
- 2014: Figueirense U17
- 2015: Brasil de Farroupilha
- 2015–2016: Ceará U20
- 2016: Ceará (interim)
- 2017: Água Santa U20
- 2017: Rio Branco-AC
- 2017: Paraná
- 2018: Rio Branco-AC
- 2018: Esportivo
- 2018: Atibaia
- 2019: Cianorte
- 2019: Barra-SC
- 2020: Veranópolis
- 2021: Patrocinense
- 2021: Veranópolis
- 2022: Guarany de Bagé
- 2022: Veranópolis
- 2022: Monsoon
- 2023: Manauara
- 2023: São Luiz
- 2024: Botafogo-PB
- 2024: CSA
- 2024: Atlético Tubarão
- 2024: Manaus
- 2025: Serra Branca
- 2025: Luverdense
- 2025: Marcílio Dias
- 2025–2026: São Luiz
- 2026: Joinville
- 2026: Amazonas
- 2026: Santa Cruz

Cristian Ziani de Souza (born 6 October 1977) is a Brazilian professional football coach.

== Career ==
Born in Quaraí, Rio Grande do Sul, Cristian was a futsal player and retired at the age of 24. After beginning his career with Esportivo's youth categories, he later worked as an assistant at the club, and at Veranópolis and Pelotas. In 2010, he joined Grêmio and became their under-17 coach.

Cristian became the under-20 coach of Grêmio in 2011, but was dismissed on 4 August of that year. He later returned to Pelotas as a technical coordinator, and worked at Fragata Futebol Clube under the same role.

On 17 December 2014, Cristian left the under-17 team of Figueirense to take over Brasil de Farroupilha. He was sacked from the latter on 1 April 2015, he joined Ceará in September as coach of the under-20s.

On 28 March 2016, Cristian became an interim head coach of Ceará. He returned to his previous role after the appointment of Sérgio Soares, and left in November to take over the under-20 team of Atibaia; he left the latter shortly after, however, and worked with Água Santa in the 2017 Copa São Paulo de Futebol Júnior.

On 27 January 2017, Cristian was presented at Rio Branco-AC. In May, he resigned from the club to take over Série B side Paraná, but was dismissed on 14 July after 14 matches.

On 14 December 2017, Cristian returned to Rio Branco, but was relieved from his duties the following 1 March. He returned to his first club Esportivo on 2 April 2018, now as head coach, but ended the season in charge of Atibaia.

On 3 August 2018, Cristian agreed to become the head coach of Cianorte for the upcoming season. He left on 1 April 2019, and worked at Barra-SC before returning to Veranópolis on 14 October of that year.

Cristian took over Patrocinense on 12 May 2021, but returned to Veranópolis on 2 July. On 4 February 2022, he agreed to become a head coach of Guarany de Bagé, with an agreement to return to Veranópolis afterards.

On 10 July 2022, Cristian was named Monsoon head coach, and won the Campeonato Gaúcho Série B with the club in an unbeaten status. He was announced at Manauara on 18 November 2022, After reaching the finals of the 2023 Campeonato Amazonense, he took over São Luiz on 1 May of that year.

On 1 November 2023, after winning the 2023 Copa FGF with São Luiz, Cristian was announced at Botafogo-PB. On 28 February 2024, however, he left the club on a mutual agreement, and took over fellow Série C side CSA on 15 March.

Cristian was sacked from CSA on 13 May 2024, after a 5–0 loss to Athletic-MG. He was subsequently in charge of Atlético Tubarão, Manaus, Serra Branca, Luverdense, Marcílio Dias, São Luiz and Joinville before returning to the third division with Amazonas on 14 March 2026.

On 6 May 2026, Cristian left Amazonas to take over fellow league team Santa Cruz. Despite helping the club to achieve promotion to the second division, his contract was not renewed and his departure was announced on 19 October.

== Honours ==
Monsoon

- Campeonato Gaúcho Série B: 2022

São Luiz

- Copa FGF: 2023

CSA

- Copa Alagoas: 2024
