= Marcelo Marelli =

Brazilian football coach

Personal information
- Full name: Marcelo Marelli Manhaes
- Date of birth: 28 January 1982 (age 44)
- Place of birth: Rio de Janeiro, Brazil

Team information
- Current team: Guarani (assistant)

Managerial career
- Years: Team
- 2008–2009: Flamengo U15
- 2010–2011: CFZ do Rio U20
- 2012–2014: Corinthians U13
- 2014: Flamengo-SP U20 (assistant)
- 2015–2017: Flamengo-SP U20
- 2017: Atibaia U20
- 2018: Flamengo-SP
- 2019: Palmas
- 2019: Ponte Preta U17
- 2020: Bangu U20
- 2021: Bangu
- 2021–2022: Flamengo-SP
- 2023: Audax U20
- 2023–2024: Taquaritinga
- 2025: Sertãozinho
- 2025–2026: São José-SP
- 2026: Rio Branco-SP
- 2026–: Guarani (assistant)

Marcelo Marelli Manhaes (born 28 January 1982) is a Brazilian football coach, currently the assistant coach of Guarani.

== Career ==
Born in Rio de Janeiro, Marelli played youth football before retiring in 2000 to pursue a coaching career. He had an internship at Flamengo at the age of 23, working as a fitness coach of the under-15 squad, before becoming the category's head coach in 2008.

Marelli worked as a coach of the under-20 team of CFZ do Rio in 2011, before joining Corinthians in the following year, as a head coach of the under-13s. He left for Flamengo-SP in 2014 after a partnership between both clubs was established, and led the under-20s to the semifinals of the Campeonato Paulista Sub-20 in 2015.

In February 2018, after a short period in charge of Atibaia's under-20 team, Marelli returned to Flamengo de Guarulhos and was named head coach of the first team in the Campeonato Paulista Segunda Divisão. In January 2019, he took over Palmas, but was sacked on 19 May.

Marelli subsequently returned to the youth categories, being in charge of Ponte Preta's under-17 team and Bangu's under-20 squad. He later worked as an assistant of interim Júnior Martins at the latter in 2020, before being confirmed as head coach of the first team on 30 December of that year.

Dismissed by Bangu on 10 April 2021, Marelli returned to Flamenguinho on 11 June. He left the club at the end of the 2022 season, and was named Taquaritinga head coach on 6 February 2023, shortly after being in charge of Audax's under-20 team in the year's Copa São Paulo de Futebol Júnior.

Sacked from CAT on 19 September 2024, Marelli was announced at the helm of Sertãozinho the following day. He led the latter club to the Campeonato Paulista Série A3 title, being chosen as the best head coach of the competition.

On 22 April 2025, Marelli was announced as São José-SP head coach. Despite being knocked out of the Copa Paulista in the quarterfinals, he renewed his contract with the club on 19 September, but was sacked on 25 January 2026.

== Personal life ==
In 2014, Marelli underwent surgery after uncovering a head tumor.

== Honours ==
Sertãozinho

- Campeonato Paulista Série A3: 2025

Individual

- Campeonato Paulista Série A3 Best Head Coach: 2025
