= Ranielle Ribeiro =

Brazilian footballer

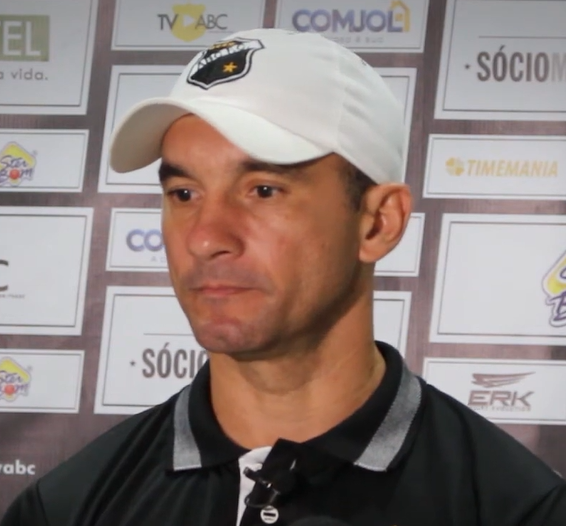
- Ribeiro in 2018

Personal information
- Full name: Ranielle Damaceno Ribeiro
- Date of birth: 25 August 1979 (age 47)
- Place of birth: Natal, Brazil

Team information
- Current team: América de Natal (head coach)

Senior career*
Years	Team	Apps	(Gls)
2000–2004	América de Natal (futsal)		
2006	ABC (futsal)		

Managerial career
- 2011: ABC (interim)
- 2013: ABC (interim)
- 2016: ABC (interim)
- 2017: ABC (interim)
- 2017: ABC (interim)
- 2017: ABC (interim)
- 2018–2019: ABC
- 2020: Lagarto
- 2020–2021: Anápolis
- 2021–2022: Campinense
- 2023: Santa Cruz
- 2024: Serra Branca
- 2024: ASA
- 2024: Ferroviário
- 2025: ASA
- 2026–: América de Natal
- * Club domestic league appearances and goals

Ranielle Damaceno Ribeiro (born 25 August 1979) is a Brazilian professional football coach and former futsal player. He is the current head coach of América de Natal.

== Career ==
Born in Natal, Rio Grande do Norte, Ribeiro was a futsal player for hometown sides América de Natal and ABC before retiring. He later became a fitness coach at his last club, being also an interim manager on several occasions between 2011 and 2017.

Ribeiro was definitely appointed manager of ABC on 29 November 2017, for the ensuing campaign. He was dismissed on 13 May 2019, and took over Lagarto on 24 October of that year.

Ribeiro left Lagarto on 6 March 2020, as the club ended their activities for the season. He was named in charge of Anápolis on 18 November, but resigned the following 29 March.

On 20 April 2021, Ribeiro was appointed manager of Série D side Campinense. On 17 November, after achieving promotion to the Série C, he renewed his contract for a further year.

Ribeiro was sacked by Campinense on 3 July 2022, with the club in the relegation zone of the 2022 Série C.

== Honours ==
Campinense

- Campeonato Paraibano: 2022

América de Natal

- Campeonato Potiguar: 2026
