= Felipe Surian =

Brazilian football manager (born 1981)

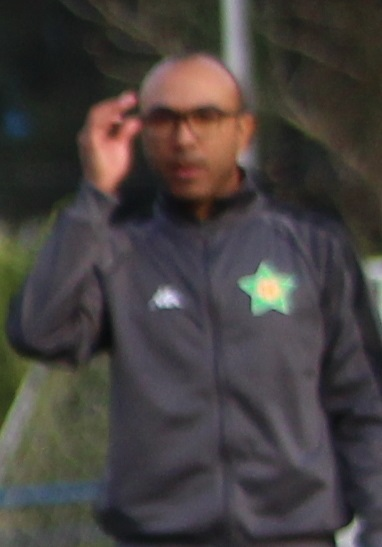
- Surian in 2022

Personal information
- Full name: Felipe da Silva Surian
- Date of birth: 3 October 1981 (age 45)
- Place of birth: Juiz de Fora, Brazil
- Position: Centre back

Youth career
- América Mineiro

Senior career*
Years	Team	Apps	(Gls)
2004–2007	Tupi		

Managerial career
- 2008–2012: Tupi (assistant)
- 2012–2013: Tupi
- 2014: Anápolis
- 2014: Caldense
- 2015: Tupi
- 2015: Villa Nova
- 2016: Volta Redonda
- 2017: América de Natal
- 2017–2018: Volta Redonda
- 2018: Uberlândia
- 2019: Tupynambás
- 2019: Joinville
- 2020: Uberlândia
- 2020–2021: Portuguesa-RJ
- 2021: Sampaio Corrêa
- 2022–2023: Portuguesa-RJ
- 2023: Botafogo-PB
- 2024: Floresta
- 2024: Barra-SC
- 2024–2025: Sampaio Corrêa
- 2025: Treze
- 2025: Capital
- 2026: Madureira
- 2026: Sampaio Corrêa-RJ
- 2026: Remo (assistant)
- * Club domestic league appearances and goals

Felipe da Silva Surian (born 3 October 1981), known as Felipe Surian, is a Brazilian football coach and former player who played as a central defender.

== Career ==
Born in Juiz de Fora, Minas Gerais, Surian was an América Mineiro youth graduate. He then played for several clubs in his native state before retiring with Tupi in 2007.

In 2008, Surian became Tupi's assistant manager, and was also interim manager in 2012. Definitely appointed manager for the 2013 season, he led the club to their promotion to the Campeonato Brasileiro Série C.

In 2014, Surian was in charge of Anápolis and Caldense, and returned to Tupi for the 2015 campaign. In that year, he also managed Villa Nova.

On 1 December 2015, Surian took over Volta Redonda, and won the Campeonato Brasileiro Série D with the club. He was subsequently named at the helm of América de Natal, but returned to Voltaço in March 2017.

== Honours ==
Volta Redonda

- Campeonato Brasileiro Série D: 2016
- Taça Rio: 2016
