= Monsoon FC =

Monsoon
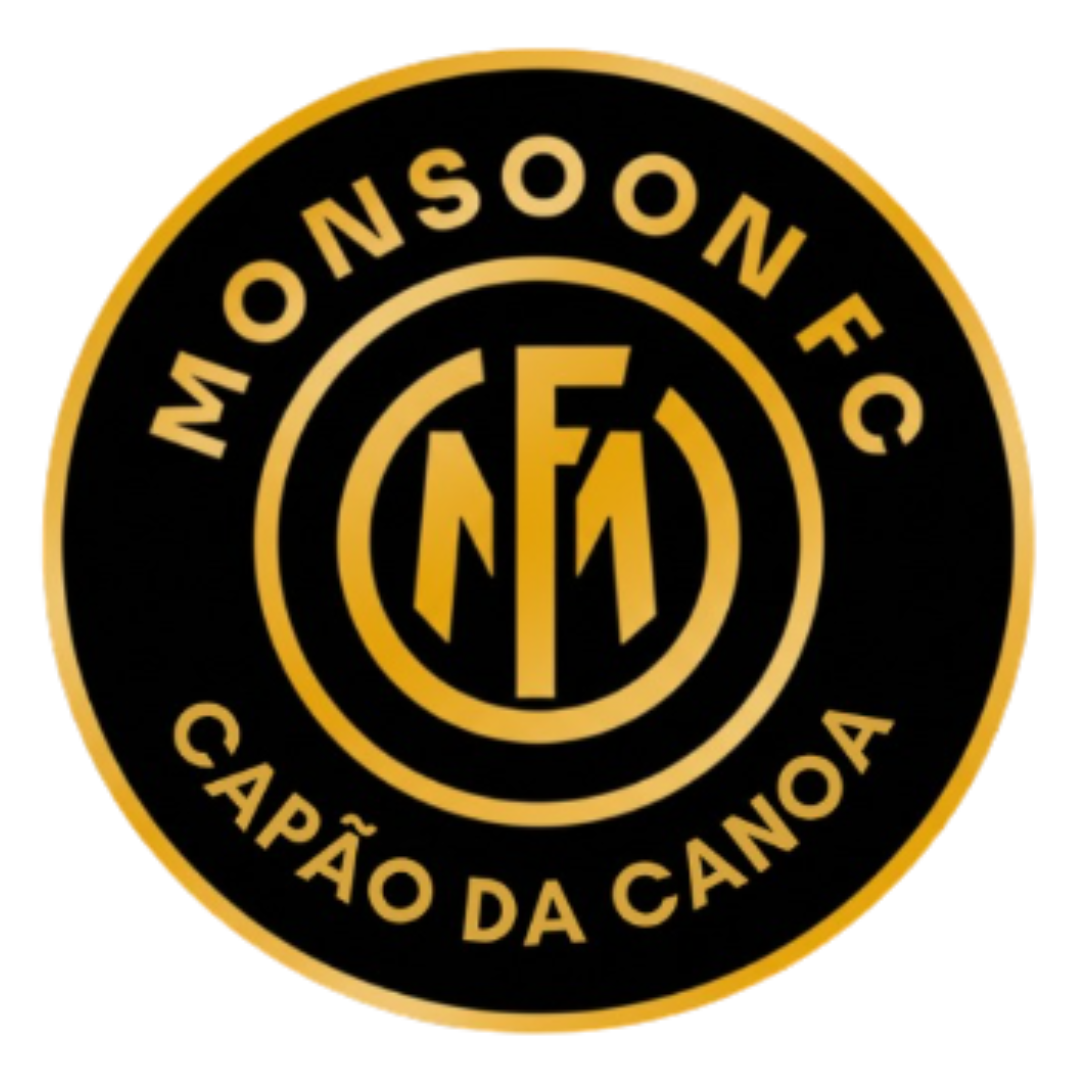
- Full name: Monsoon Futebol Clube
- Founded: 22 November 2021; 4 years ago
- Ground: Parque Lami
- Capacity: 1,500
- President: Lucas Pirez
- Head coach: Christian Souza
- League: Campeonato Gaúcho
- 2025: Gaúcho Série A2, 8th of 12
- Website: https://monsoonfc.com/
Home colors	Away colors

== History ==
The club was established in 2021 by Lucas Pires, a MMA promotor of several famous Brazilian fighters (as Fabrício Werdum and Maurício Rua) with the United Arab Emirates group Monsoon VP International. The club is established in the former structures of Porto Alegre Futebol Clube, club owned by the former football player Assis.

== Honours ==
- Campeonato Gaúcho Série A2
  - Winners (1): 2024
- Campeonato Gaúcho Série B
  - Winners (1): 2022

== Appearances ==
Following is the summary of Monsoon appearances in Campeonato Gaúcho.

Season	Division	Final position
2022	3rd	1st
2023	2nd	3rd
2024	2nd	1st
2025	1st	7th
