= Gerson Gusmão =

Brazilian footballer (born 1974)

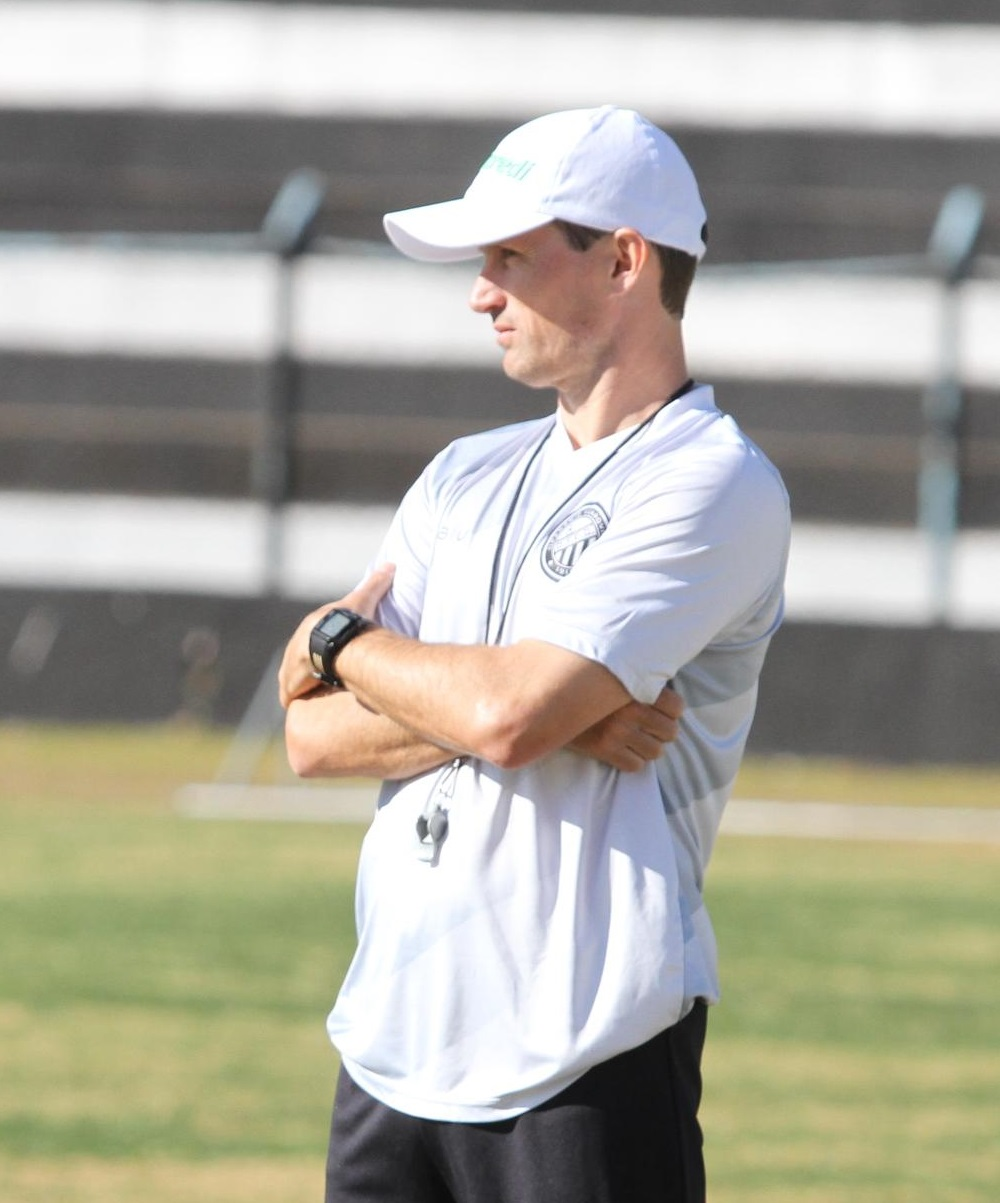
- Gusmão in 2018

Personal information
- Full name: Gerson Luiz Gusmão
- Date of birth: 8 May 1974 (age 52)
- Place of birth: Novo Hamburgo, Brazil
- Position: Left back

Team information
- Current team: Serra Branca (head coach)

Senior career*
Years	Team	Apps	(Gls)
- Pelotas
1997–1998	Blummenau		
1998	Novo Hamburgo	0	(0)
1999	15 de Novembro	16	(0)
1999	Palmeirense		
2000	Novo Hamburgo	26	(2)
2001	Santa Cruz-RS	24	(1)
2002	Glória	21	(1)
2003	Sapiranga	17	(1)
2004	São Gabriel	7	(0)
2005	Novo Hamburgo	6	(2)
2006	Brasil de Pelotas		

Managerial career
- 2007–2009: Novo Hamburgo (youth)
- 2009–2011: Novo Hamburgo (assistant)
- 2009: Novo Hamburgo (interim)
- 2011: Chapecoense (assistant)
- 2012: Santo André (assistant)
- 2013–2014: Novo Hamburgo (assistant)
- 2014: Caxias (assistant)
- 2015: Operário Ferroviário (assistant)
- 2016: Novo Hamburgo
- 2016–2020: Operário Ferroviário
- 2021–2022: Botafogo-PB
- 2022: Remo
- 2023: River
- 2023: Floresta
- 2023–2024: Caxias
- 2024: Confiança
- 2025: Aparecidense
- 2025: Linense
- 2025: Sampaio Corrêa
- 2025: América de Natal
- 2026: Nacional-AM
- 2026–: Serra Branca
- * Club domestic league appearances and goals

Gerson Luiz Gusmão (born 8 May 1974) is a Brazilian professional football coach and former player who played as a left back. He is the current head coach of Serra Branca.

== Career ==
Born in Novo Hamburgo, Rio Grande do Sul, Gusmão played as a left back during his career. Known as Gerson during his playing days, he represented Pelotas, Blumenau, Novo Hamburgo (three stints), Esporte Clube Palmeirense, Santa Cruz-RS, Glória, Associação Esportiva Sapiranga, São Gabriel and Brasil de Pelotas.

In 2007, one year after retiring, Gusmão returned to Novo Hamburgo and was appointed manager of the under-17 squad. He worked with the under-19s in 2009, being later appointed Paulo Turra's assistant at the main squad; after the manager's dismissal, he acted as an interim.

Gusmão left Noia in 2011, and worked as Itamar Schülle's assistant at Chapecoense and Santo André before returning to the club in 2013. In 2014, he again followed Schülle at Caxias.

In 2015, Gusmão was also working as Schülle's assistant at Operário Ferroviário. On 20 November of that year, he was appointed manager of Novo Hamburgo for the upcoming season.

On 23 March 2016, Gusmão was named manager of Operário Ferroviário. Despite suffering relegation in the year's Campeonato Paranaense, he went on to win the Taça FPF later in the season, and also managed to achieve two consecutive promotions, both as champions.

On 20 October 2020, after more than four years in charge, Gusmão was sacked by Operário. He took over Botafogo-PB on 3 April 2021, before opting to leave the club to manage Remo on 21 June 2022.

Gusmão was sacked by Remo on 16 August 2022, as the club missed out qualification in the 2022 Série C. On 18 April 2023, he was named in charge of Floresta also in the third division.

On 20 June 2023, Floresta announced the departure of Gusmão, with the club announcing his appointment at Caxias. He was led the latter to promotion in the 2023 Série D, but was sacked on 16 February 2024.

On 8 March 2024, Gusmão was appointed head coach of fellow third division side Confiança, but left by mutual consent on 17 June.

== Honours ==
=== Player ===
Novo Hamburgo

- Campeonato Gaúcho Série A2: 2000
- Copa FGF: 2005

=== Manager ===
Operário Ferroviário

- Campeonato Brasileiro Série C: 2018
- Campeonato Brasileiro Série D: 2017
- Campeonato Paranaense Série A2: 2018
- Taça FPF: 2016

River

- Campeonato Piauiense: 2023
