= Floresta Esporte Clube =

Brazilian association football club based in Fortaleza, Ceará, Brazil

Floresta
- Full name: Floresta Esporte Clube
- Nicknames: Verdão da Vila (Big Mad Troup); Tropa do Malvadão; Lobo da Vila Manoel Sátiro (Manoel Sátiro Village's Wolf)
- Founded: 9 November 1954; 71 years ago
- Ground: Presidente Vargas
- Capacity: 20,268
- President: Diego do Nascimento Felício
- Head coach: Gerson Gusmão
- League: Campeonato Brasileiro Série C Campeonato Cearense
- 2025 2025: Série C, 8th of 20; Cearense, 7th of 10
- Website: https://pt-br.facebook.com/florestaec
Home colors	Away colors

Floresta Esporte Clube, simply known as Floresta, is a football (soccer) club from Fortaleza, Ceará, Brazil. Founded in 1954, it currently plays in the Campeonato Cearense and Campeonato Brasileiro série C.

== History ==
Founded in 1954, the club only joined the regional championships in 2015, playing in the third division of the Campeonato Cearense and immediately achieving promotion to the second level as runners-up. After two years in the second division, the club finished second in 2017 and achieved promotion to the first tier.

In the 2017 Copa Fares Lopes, the club was crowned champions and earned a place in the 2018 Copa do Brasil.

During the beginning the 2020 season, the Floresta ended up being relegated in the Campeonato Cearense, after finishing in the penultimate position. Due to the covid-19 pandemic, the club spent almost seven months without playing official games. In September, the team started its participation in the Campeonato Brasileiro série D. Although had a difficult start to the season due to relegation in the Estadual and also due to several months without playing official matches, the Floresta managed to get into the top four of the national championship and secured access to the 2021 Campeonato Brasileiro Serie C.

== Stadium ==
Floresta's stadium is Estádio Felipe Santiago, with a capacity of 2,000 people. The club often play in different stadiums within the surroundings of Fortaleza, and played the 2020 Série D at the Domingão in Horizonte, Ceará. The club played the 2021 Série C at the Centro de Treinamento Luis Campos, a training ground for Ceará.

== Honours ==
=== National ===
- Campeonato Brasileiro Série D
  - Runners-up (1): 2020

=== State ===
- Copa Fares Lopes
  - Winners (1): 2017
- Copa dos Campeões Cearenses
  - Winners (1): 2018
