= 2026 Campeonato Brasileiro Série C =

Campeonato Brasileiro Série C
- Season: 2026
- Dates: 4 April – 24 October
- Champions: Maringá (1st title)
- Promoted: Ferroviária; Inter de Limeira; Maringá; Santa Cruz
- Relegated: Confiança; Itabaiana
- Matches: 216
- Goals: 488 (2.26 per match)
- Top goalscorer: Miguel Bianconi (10 goals)
- Longest winning run: 5 games Botafogo-PB
- Longest unbeaten run: 11 games Botafogo-PB
- Longest winless run: 8 games Confiança
- Longest losing run: 6 games Botafogo-PB

The 2026 Campeonato Brasileiro Série C was a football competition held in Brazil, equivalent to the third division. It began on 4 April and ended on 24 October 2026.

Twenty teams competed in the tournament, twelve returning from the 2025 season, four promoted from the 2025 Campeonato Brasileiro Série D (Barra, Inter de Limeira, Maranhão and Santa Cruz) and four relegated from the 2025 Campeonato Brasileiro Série B (Amazonas, Ferroviária, Paysandu and Volta Redonda).

== Format ==
The first stage had one group where each team played the other teams in a single round-robin tournament. The top eight teams advanced to the second stage, while the bottom two were relegated, as a part of the expansion planned for the division. In the second stage, the teams were divided into two groups of four teams each. Each group was played on a home-and-away round-robin basis. The top two teams of each group were promoted to the Série B, while the group winners advanced to the finals.

== Teams ==
Location of teams in 2026 Série C

Pos.	Relegated from 2025 Série B
17th	Ferroviária
18th	Amazonas
19th	Volta Redonda
20th	Paysandu

Pos.	Promoted from 2025 Série D
1st	Barra
2nd	Santa Cruz
3rd	Inter de Limeira
4th	Maranhão

=== Number of teams by state ===
Number of teams	State	Team(s)
4	São Paulo	Ferroviária, Guarani, Inter de Limeira and Ituano
3	Santa Catarina	Barra, Brusque and Figueirense
2	Rio Grande do Sul	Caxias and Ypiranga
2	Sergipe	Confiança and Itabaiana
1	Amazonas	Amazonas
1	Ceará	Floresta
1	Goiás	Anápolis
1	Maranhão	Maranhão
1	Pará	Paysandu
1	Paraíba	Botafogo-PB
1	Paraná	Maringá
1	Pernambuco	Santa Cruz
1	Rio de Janeiro	Volta Redonda

=== Stadiums and locations ===
Team	Home city	State	Stadium	Capacity
Amazonas	Manaus	Amazonas	Municipal Carlos Zamith	5,000
Amazonas	Manaus	Amazonas	Arena da Amazônia	44,000
Anápolis	Anápolis	Goiás	Jonas Duarte	14,000
Barra	Itajaí	Santa Catarina	Arena Barra FC	5,500
Botafogo-PB	João Pessoa	Paraíba	Almeidão	25,770
Brusque	Brusque	Santa Catarina	Augusto Bauer	5,000
Caxias	Caxias do Sul	Rio Grande do Sul	Centenário	22,132
Confiança	Aracaju	Sergipe	Batistão	15,575
Ferroviária	Araraquara	São Paulo	Fonte Luminosa	20,000
Figueirense	Florianópolis	Santa Catarina	Orlando Scarpelli	19,584
Floresta	Fortaleza	Ceará	Presidente Vargas	20,262
Guarani	Campinas	São Paulo	Brinco de Ouro	29,130
Inter de Limeira	Limeira	São Paulo	Major José Levy Sobrinho	23,475
Itabaiana	Itabaiana	Sergipe	Etelvino Mendonça	12,000
Ituano	Itu	São Paulo	Novelli Júnior	18,560
Maranhão	São Luís	Maranhão	Castelão	40,149
Maringá	Maringá	Paraná	Willie Davids	16,226
Paysandu	Belém	Pará	Curuzu	16,200
Paysandu	Belém	Pará	Mangueirão	53,635
Santa Cruz	Recife	Pernambuco	Arruda	60,044
Santa Cruz	Recife	Pernambuco	Arena Pernambuco (São Lourenço da Mata)	45,500
Volta Redonda	Volta Redonda	Rio de Janeiro	Raulino de Oliveira	20,255
Ypiranga	Erechim	Rio Grande do Sul	Colosso da Lagoa	22,000

== Personnel and kits ==
Team	Head coach	Captain	Kit manufacturer	Kit main sponsor
Amazonas	(Brazil) Rodrigo Santana	(Brazil) Diego Ivo	Onça (Note: Club manufactured kit)	Amazonas Shopping, MOTO FIVE
Anápolis	(Brazil) Luan Carlos	(Brazil) Matheus Lagoa	Kelme	Brejeiro
Barra	(Brazil) Evaristo Piza	(Brazil) Jean Pierre	Pescador	KNN Idiomas
Botafogo-PB	(Brazil) Victor Ferraz (caretaker)	(Brazil) Nenê	Kappa	Setai, Pix do Milhão, GirosBET
Brusque	(Brazil) Higo Magalhães	(Brazil) Bernardo	Junpe Uniformes	HAVAN
Caxias	(Brazil) William de Mattia	(Brazil) Marcelo Freitas	CATÊ	Banrisul, Postos SIM
Confiança	(Brazil) Ricardo Resende	(Brazil) Ícaro	Tolledo Sports	Banese Card
Ferroviária	(Brazil) Rogério Corrêa	(Brazil) Ricardinho	Lupo Sport	Esportes da Sorte, BaladAPP, GB Tickets
Figueirense	(Brazil) Raul Cabral	(Brazil) Lucas Dias	Volt Sport	Grupo Liderança, Dominik & Domitek
Floresta	(Brazil) Leston Júnior	(Brazil) Dheimison	Golaço	
Guarani	(Brazil) Umberto Louzer	(Brazil) Caíque França	Reebok	Única Saúde, ASA Alumínio, RIO Investidora e Construtora, Furacão
Inter de Limeira	(Brazil) Matheus Costa	(Brazil) Miguel Bianconi	Dubal Esportes	Construjá, Xbri Pneus, Lukma Electric
Itabaiana	(Brazil) Marcelo Chamusca	(Brazil) Gustavo Crecci	Robrac	Lotese, Banese Card
Ituano	~~(Brazil) Mazola Júnior~~ (Note: Mazola Júnior was the head coach of Ituano during the first stage, but took over Paysandu during the second stage, after Ituano were already knocked out of the competition)	(Brazil) Guilherme Xavier	Tolledo Sports	ADGM Sports, HARAS Coração de Cavalo
Maranhão	(Brazil) Jerson Testoni	(Brazil) André Radija	Golkiper	Franklin Tendas, Lojas Shartom, Granorte, Estrelas Internet
Maringá	(Brazil) Ivan Campanari	(Brazil) Wendel Lomar	Maringá	CRESOL, Aposta Tudo Bet, UniCesumar
Paysandu	(Brazil) Júnior Rocha	(Brazil) Marcinho	Lobo	Bet dá Sorte, Banpará
Santa Cruz	(Brazil) Cristian de Souza	(Brazil) William Alves	Reebok	Bet dá Sorte, Nord Pharma
Volta Redonda	(Brazil) Neto Colucci (caretaker)	(Brazil) Bruno Barra	Pratic Sport	BETesporte, CINBAL
Ypiranga	(Brazil) Gabardo Júnior	(Brazil) Willian Gomes	Piensa	Banrisul, Aurora, Cavaletti

=== Coaching changes ===
Team	Outgoing head coach	Manner of departure	Date of vacancy	Position in table	Incoming head coach	Date of appointment	Ref
Botafogo-PB	(Brazil) Evaristo Piza	Signed by Campinense	22 September 2025	Pre-season	(Brazil) Bernardo Franco	20 October 2025	
Itabaiana	(Brazil) Gilson Kleina	End of contract	23 September 2025	Pre-season	(Brazil) Roberto Fonseca	27 September 2025	
Anápolis	(Brazil) Gabardo Júnior	End of contract	29 September 2025	Pre-season	(Brazil) Ângelo Luiz (Note: Luiz Carlos Winck was announced as head coach on 3 October 2025, but left on 15 December after triggering his release clause.)	16 December 2025	
Inter de Limeira	(Brazil) Ademir Fesan	End of contract	7 October 2025	Pre-season	(Brazil) Alberto Félix	10 November 2025	
Caxias	(Brazil) Júnior Rocha	End of contract	18 October 2025	Pre-season	(Brazil) Fernando Marchiori	29 October 2025	
Brusque	(Brazil) Bernardo Franco	Signed by Botafogo-PB	20 October 2025	Pre-season	(Brazil) Higo Magalhães	11 November 2025	
Volta Redonda	(Brazil) Neto Colucci	End of caretaker spell	19 November 2025	Pre-season	(Brazil) Rodrigo Santana	8 December 2025	
Paysandu	(Brazil) Ignácio Neto	End of caretaker spell	23 November 2025	Pre-season	(Brazil) Júnior Rocha	24 November 2025	
Ferroviária	(Brazil) Daniel Azambuja	End of caretaker spell	23 November 2025	Pre-season	(Brazil) Rogério Corrêa	5 December 2025	
Amazonas	(Brazil) Aderbal Lana	Back to coordinator role	30 November 2025	Pre-season	(Brazil) Márcio Fernandes	5 January 2026	
Figueirense	(Brazil) Waguinho Dias	Sacked	22 January 2026	State leagues	(Brazil) Henrique Lima (caretaker)	22 January 2026	
Inter de Limeira	(Brazil) Alberto Félix	Sacked	24 January 2026	State leagues	(Brazil) Waguinho Dias	26 January 2026	
Figueirense	(Brazil) Henrique Lima	End of caretaker spell	25 January 2026	State leagues	(Brazil) Márcio Zanardi	25 January 2026	
Santa Cruz	(Brazil) Marcelo Cabo	Sacked	26 January 2026	State leagues	(Brazil) Fábio Cortez (caretaker)	27 January 2026	
Caxias	(Brazil) Fernando Marchiori	Resigned	31 January 2026	State leagues	(Brazil) Marcelo Cabo	31 January 2026	
Botafogo-PB	(Brazil) Bernardo Franco	Sacked	1 February 2026	State leagues	(Brazil) Lisca	2 February 2026	
Confiança	(Brazil) Luizinho Vieira	Sacked	2 February 2026	State leagues	(Brazil) Ricardo Resende (caretaker)	2 February 2026	
Itabaiana	(Brazil) Roberto Fonseca	Sacked	9 February 2026	State leagues	(Brazil) Ferreira (caretaker)	10 February 2026	
Maringá	(Brazil) Rodrigo Chipp	Mutual agreement	11 February 2026	State leagues	(Brazil) Moisés Egert	13 February 2026	
Volta Redonda	(Brazil) Rodrigo Santana	Signed by Ponte Preta	22 February 2026	State leagues	(Brazil) Neto Colucci (caretaker)	24 February 2026	
Confiança	(Brazil) Ricardo Resende	End of caretaker spell	25 February 2026	State leagues	(Brazil) Cláudio Caçapa	24 February 2026	
Santa Cruz	(Brazil) Fábio Cortez	End of caretaker spell	24 February 2026	State leagues	(Brazil) Claudinei Oliveira	24 February 2026	
Guarani	(Brazil) Matheus Costa	26 February 2026	Sacked	State leagues	(Brazil) Elio Sizenando	11 March 2026	
Inter de Limeira	(Brazil) Waguinho Dias	9 March 2026	Sacked	State leagues	(Brazil) Matheus Costa	11 March 2026	
Barra	(Brazil) Eduardo Souza	Signed by Atlético Goianiense	10 March 2026	State leagues	(Brazil) Rafael Piccinin (caretaker)	12 March 2026	
Amazonas	(Brazil) Márcio Fernandes	Sacked	13 March 2026	State leagues	(Brazil) Cristian de Souza	14 March 2026	
Itabaiana	(Brazil) Ferreira	End of caretaker spell	16 March 2026	State leagues	(Brazil) Gilson Kleina	16 March 2026	
Volta Redonda	(Brazil) Neto Colucci	End of caretaker spell	16 March 2026	State leagues	(Brazil) William de Mattia	16 March 2026	
Barra	(Brazil) Rafael Piccinin	End of caretaker spell	20 March 2026	State leagues	(Brazil) Bernardo Franco	20 March 2026	
Anápolis	(Brazil) Ângelo Luiz	Sacked	12 April 2026	19th	(Brazil) Caio Lucas (caretaker)	15 April 2026	
Figueirense	(Brazil) Márcio Zanardi	Sacked	14 April 2026	14th	(Brazil) Raul Cabral	16 April 2026	
Maranhão	(Brazil) Marcinho Guerreiro	Mutual agreement	16 April 2026	15th	(Brazil) Jerson Testoni	16 April 2026	
Ypiranga	(Brazil) Raul Cabral	Signed by Figueirense	16 April 2026	5th	(Brazil) Téo Chrysosthemos (caretaker)	16 April 2026	
Anápolis	(Brazil) Caio Lucas	End of caretaker spell	16 April 2026	20th	(Brazil) Evaristo Piza	16 April 2026	
Ypiranga	(Brazil) Téo Chrysosthemos	End of caretaker spell	21 April 2026	2nd	(Brazil) Gabardo Júnior	21 April 2026	
Volta Redonda	(Brazil) William de Mattia	Sacked	27 April 2026	17th	(Brazil) Mário Jorge	28 April 2026	
Botafogo-PB	(Brazil) Lisca	Sacked	28 April 2026	7th	(Brazil) Marcelo Fernandes	28 April 2026	
Santa Cruz	(Brazil) Claudinei Oliveira	Sacked	3 May 2026	14th	(Brazil) Cristian de Souza	6 May 2026	
Itabaiana	(Brazil) Gilson Kleina	Mutual consent	4 May 2026	20th	(Brazil) Marcelo Chamusca	6 May 2026	
Amazonas	(Brazil) Cristian de Souza	Signed by Santa Cruz	6 May 2026	1st	(Brazil) Lecheva (caretaker)	8 May 2026	
Confiança	(Brazil) Cláudio Caçapa	Sacked	10 May 2026	18th	(Brazil) Ricardo Resende (caretaker)	10 May 2026	
Amazonas	(Brazil) Lecheva	End of caretaker spell	13 May 2026	3rd	(Brazil) Bebeto Sauthier (caretaker)	13 May 2026	
Confiança	(Brazil) Ricardo Resende	End of caretaker spell	18 May 2026	16th	(Brazil) Thiago Gomes	18 May 2026	
Amazonas	(Brazil) Bebeto Sauthier	End of caretaker spell	26 May 2026	5th	(Brazil) Rodrigo Santana	26 May 2026	
Anápolis	(Brazil) Evaristo Piza	Mutual agreement	16 June 2026	20th	(Brazil) Roberto Fernandes	17 June 2026	
Barra	(Brazil) Bernardo Franco	Sacked	28 June 2026	17th	(Brazil) Evaristo Piza	28 June 2026	
Anápolis	(Brazil) Roberto Fernandes	Mutual agreement	13 July 2026	20th	(Brazil) Luan Carlos	13 July 2026	
Confiança	(Brazil) Thiago Gomes	Sacked	15 July 2026	19th	(Brazil) Ricardo Resende	15 July 2026	
Volta Redonda	(Brazil) Mário Jorge	Sacked	10 August 2026	16th	(Brazil) Neto Colucci (caretaker)	10 August 2026	
Maringá	(Brazil) Moisés Egert	Sacked	10 August 2026	11th	(Brazil) Ivan Campanari	13 August 2026	
Caxias	(Brazil) Marcelo Cabo	Sacked	17 August 2026	9th	(Brazil) William de Mattia	17 August 2026	
Guarani	(Brazil) Elio Sizenando	Sacked	23 August 2026	6th	(Brazil) Umberto Louzer	24 August 2026	
Paysandu	(Brazil) Júnior Rocha	Sacked	13 September 2026	4th (Group C)	(Brazil) Mazola Júnior	14 September 2026	
Botafogo-PB	(Brazil) Marcelo Fernandes	Sacked	26 September 2026	4th (Group D)	(Brazil) Victor Ferraz (caretaker)	27 September 2026	

== First stage ==
In the first stage, each team played the other nineteen teams in a single round-robin tournament. The teams were ranked according to points (3 points for a win, 1 point for a draw, and 0 points for a loss). If tied on points, the following criteria would be used to determine the ranking: 1. Wins; 2. Goal difference; 3. Goals scored; 4. Fewest red cards; 5. Fewest yellow cards; 6. Draw in the headquarters of the Brazilian Football Confederation (Regulations Article 16).

The top eight teams advanced to the second stage, while the bottom two were relegated to Série D.

=== Group A ===
Pos	Team	Pld	W	D	L	GF	GA	GD	Pts	Qualification or relegation
1	Botafogo-PB	19	10	3	6	28	19	+9	33	Advance to Second stage
2	Brusque	19	9	5	5	28	22	+6	32	Advance to Second stage
3	Ferroviária	19	8	6	5	22	15	+7	30	Advance to Second stage
4	Maringá	19	8	6	5	32	30	+2	30	Advance to Second stage
5	Floresta	19	8	6	5	22	20	+2	30 (Note: Red cards: Floresta 0, Inter de Limeira 3)	Advance to Second stage
6	Inter de Limeira	19	8	6	5	22	20	+2	30	Advance to Second stage
7	Paysandu	19	9	2	8	26	27	−1	29	Advance to Second stage
8	Santa Cruz	19	8	5	6	20	15	+5	29	Advance to Second stage
9	Ypiranga	19	8	5	6	27	24	+3	29	
10	Guarani	19	7	7	5	34	24	+10	28	
11	Figueirense	19	7	7	5	19	22	−3	28	
12	Maranhão	19	7	6	6	19	18	+1	27	
13	Amazonas	19	7	5	7	21	23	−2	26	
14	Caxias	19	6	7	6	17	16	+1	25	
15	Ituano	19	6	4	9	18	21	−3	22	
16	Volta Redonda	19	6	3	10	13	25	−12	21	
17	Barra	19	5	6	8	21	21	0	21	
18	Anápolis	19	5	4	10	17	22	−5	19	
19	Itabaiana (R)	19	4	5	10	14	27	−13	17	Relegation to 2027 Campeonato Brasileiro Série D
20	Confiança (R)	19	3	4	12	11	20	−9	13	Relegation to 2027 Campeonato Brasileiro Série D

Source: CBF
Rules for classification: 1) points; 2) wins; 3) goal difference; 4) goals scored; 5) fewest red cards; 6) fewest yellow cards; 7) draw.
(R) Relegated

=== Results ===
Home \ Away	AMA	ANA	BAR	BOT	BRU	CAX	CON	FER	FIG	FLO	GUA	INT	ITA	ITU	MAR	MGA	PAY	SAN	VOL	YPI
Amazonas		1–0		0–0		1–1		1–2	0–1				0–2	3–0	2–0		2–1			2–2
Anápolis			1–1	0–2					3–1		2–1	1–2	2–0		0–0	0–1		1–1		
Barra	1–1				2–2	0–0					0–2	2–2	1–0		3–0			1–2	2–0	
Botafogo-PB			1–0		2–0		2–0			1–2	3–1	0–1				2–1		2–2	2–0	
Brusque	1–1	1–0				2–1	2–1		3–1	2–1		3–2		1–0				0–1		3–0
Caxias		1–1		1–2			1–0		1–2	0–0		0–0		2–1		1–1	2–0			2–1
Confiança	0–1	0–1	1–2						0–0		2–0	0–1	1–1		2–1	1–1		1–0		
Ferroviária		1–0	1–0	0–2	1–0	0–1	1–0				2–2	2–0			0–0		4–0			
Figueirense			0–3	2–1				2–2			1–1		0–1		2–1	1–3	2–1		0–0	
Floresta	3–2	1–0	2–1				1–0	0–0	1–2					2–0	1–2	1–1		1–1		
Guarani	5–0				2–2	2–1				0–0		3–1	1–1	1–3				1–0	2–0	2–2
Inter de Limeira	1–0								0–0	1–2			0–0	1–1		2–2		1–2	2–0	2–1
Itabaiana				0–2	1–0	0–2		1–0		0–0				2–2			1–4		0–1	1–2
Ituano		2–0	2–0	1–0			1–0	1–3	0–0						0–0	4–1	0–1			
Maranhão				3–1	2–1	0–0					1–1	0–1	4–1				0–1		2–1	2–1
Maringá	0–3		2–1		2–3			3–2			0–5		4–2		0–0			1–1	4–0	
Paysandu		2–1	1–1	4–2	1–1		2–1			2–1	3–2	1–2				0–1		1–3		
Santa Cruz	0–1					2–0		1–1	0–1				1–0	1–0	0–1				2–0	0–1
Volta Redonda	3–0	1–4			1–1	1–0	1–0	0–0		1–2				1–0			0–1			2–1
Ypiranga		3–0	1–0	1–1			1–1	1–0	1–1	4–1				2–0		1–4	1–0			

Source: CBF
Legend: Blue = home team win; Yellow = draw; Red = away team win.

== Second stage ==
In the second stage, each group was played on a home-and-away round-robin basis. The teams were ranked according to points (3 points for a win, 1 point for a draw, and 0 points for a loss). If tied on points, the following criteria would be used to determine the ranking: 1. Wins; 2. Goal difference; 3. Goals scored; 4. Head-to-head (if the tie was only between two teams); 5. Fewest red cards; 6. Fewest yellow cards; 7. Draw in the headquarters of the Brazilian Football Confederation (Regulations Article 20).

The top two teams of each group were promoted to the Série B. Group winners advanced to the finals.

=== Group B ===
Pos	Team	Pld	W	D	L	GF	GA	GD	Pts	Qualification
1	Maringá (P)	6	3	2	1	6	2	+4	11	Advance to Finals and promoted to 2027 Série B
2	Santa Cruz (P)	6	3	2	1	5	3	+2	11	Promoted to 2027 Série B
3	Floresta	6	1	2	3	3	6	−3	5	
4	Botafogo-PB	6	1	2	3	2	5	−3	5	

Source: CBF
Rules for classification: 1) points; 2) wins; 3) goal difference; 4) goals scored; 5) head-to-head results (only between 2 teams); 6) fewest red cards; 7) fewest yellow cards; 8) draw.
(P) Promoted

==== Results ====
Home \ Away	BOT	FLO	MGA	SAN
Botafogo-PB		0–1	0–0	1–0
Floresta	1–1		0–1	1–1
Maringá	2–0	2–0		0–1
Santa Cruz	1–0	1–0	1–1	

Source: CBF
Legend: Blue = home team win; Yellow = draw; Red = away team win.

=== Group C ===
Pos	Team	Pld	W	D	L	GF	GA	GD	Pts	Qualification
1	Ferroviária (P)	6	3	2	1	10	7	+3	11	Advance to Finals and promoted to 2027 Série B
2	Inter de Limeira (P)	6	1	4	1	11	11	0	7	Promoted to 2027 Série B
3	Brusque	6	1	4	1	10	10	0	7	
4	Paysandu	6	1	2	3	5	8	−3	5	

Source: CBF
Rules for classification: 1) points; 2) wins; 3) goal difference; 4) goals scored; 5) head-to-head results (only between 2 teams); 6) fewest red cards; 7) fewest yellow cards; 8) draw.
(P) Promoted

==== Results ====
Home \ Away	BRU	FER	INT	PAY
Brusque		1–1	2–2	1–1
Ferroviária	3–2		2–0	1–0
Inter de Limeira	2–2	3–3		2–0
Paysandu	1–2	1–0	2–2	

Source: CBF
Legend: Blue = home team win; Yellow = draw; Red = away team win.

== Finals ==
The finals were played on a home-and-away two-legged basis, with the higher-seeded team hosting the second leg. If tied on aggregate, the away goals rule would not be used, extra time would not be played, and the penalty shoot-out would be used to determine the champions (Regulations Article 21).

The finalists were seeded according to their performance in the tournament. The teams were ranked according to overall points. If tied on overall points, the following criteria would be used to determine the ranking: 1. Overall wins; 2. Overall goal difference; 3. Draw in the headquarters of the Brazilian Football Confederation (Regulations Article 22).

Pos	Team	Pld	W	D	L	GF	GA	GD	Pts	Host
1	(São Paulo (state)) Ferroviária	25	11	8	6	32	22	+10	41	2nd leg
2	(Paraná (state)) Maringá	25	11	8	6	38	32	+6	41	1st leg

Source: CBF

The matches were played on 17 and 24 October 2026.

Team 1	Agg.	Team 2	1st leg	2nd leg
Maringá (Paraná (state))	3–2	(São Paulo (state)) Ferroviária	1–1	2–1

=== Matches ===
17 October 2026
17:00

Maringá (Paraná (state))	1–1	(São Paulo (state)) Ferroviária
Ronald Camarão 70'	Report	Fábio Soares 90+1'

Estádio Willie Davids, Maringá
Attendance: 12,482
Referee: Raimundo Rodrigues de Oliveira Júnior (Ceará)

24 October 2026
17:00

Ferroviária (São Paulo (state))	1–2	(Paraná (state)) Maringá
Denilson Chaves 81'	Report	Lucas Bonifácio 3'; Ronald Camarão 11'

Fonte Luminosa, Araraquara
Attendance: 11,547
Referee: Fernando Antônio Mendes de Salles Nascimento Filho (Pará)
