= Ângelo Luiz =

Brazilian football player and coach

Personal information
- Full name: Ângelo Luiz de Souza Netto
- Date of birth: 30 November 1971 (age 54)
- Place of birth: Anápolis, Brazil
- Position: Forward

Team information
- Current team: CRAC (head coach)

Senior career*
Years	Team	Apps	(Gls)
1991	Anápolis		
1992	Matsubara		
1993	Sorriso		
1994	Garça		
1995	São Borja		
1996	Sampaio Corrêa		
1997	Matsubara		
1999–2000	Luziânia		
2001	Sorriso		
2001	Planaltina		

Managerial career
- 2005: Anápolis U20
- 2010: Sinop
- 2012: Aparecidense (assistant)
- 2015: Paracatu (interim)
- 2023–2024: Anápolis (assistant)
- 2024–2025: Anápolis
- 2025: Rio Verde
- 2026: Anápolis
- 2026–: CRAC
- * Club domestic league appearances and goals

Ângelo Luiz de Souza Netto (born 30 November 1971), known as Ângelo Luiz or simply Ângelo, is a Brazilian football coach and former player who played as a forward. He is the current head coach of CRAC.

== Career ==
Born in Anápolis, Goiás, Ângelo began his career with hometown club Anápolis FC in 1991. He subsequently represented Matsubara (two stints), Sorriso (two stints), Garça, São Borja, Sampaio Corrêa, Luziânia and Planaltina; he played in the 1993 Copa do Brasil with Sorriso, and scored eight goals in the 2000 Campeonato Brasiliense with Luziânia.

After retiring, Ângelo worked as a fitness coach at Anapolina's under-20 side in 2004 before becoming a coach of the category at Anápolis in the following year. He subsequently returned to his fitness coach role, working at Imperatriz, Anápolis, Araguaia and Sinop.

In January 2010, Ângelo was appointed head coach of Sinop for the year's Campeonato Mato-Grossense. He later returned to his previous role, and worked at Anapolina and Vila Nova before becoming an assistant coach at Aparecidense in 2012.

Again a fitness coach, Ângelo was in the staff of Grêmio Anápolis and Paracatu, being also an interim coach in the latter. After being back at Anápolis, he was also a fitness coach at Joinville.

In 2023, Ângelo became a permanent assistant coach of Anápolis. On 30 July of the following year, he became the head coach after the dismissal of Hemerson Maria, and led the club to a promotion to the Série C.

Ângelo reached the 2025 Campeonato Goiano finals with Anápolis, but was sacked on 17 June of that year, after a poor performance in the 2025 Série C. He then spent a period in charge of Rio Verde, and agreed to become the head coach of ABECAT in August. In December, however, he left the latter before debuting and returned to Anápolis.

On 12 April 2026, Ângelo was dismissed from Anápolis after a winless start in the 2026 Série C.
