= Gilberto Pereira =

Brazilian football manager (born 1965)

Personal information
- Full name: Gilberto Pereira dos Santos
- Date of birth: 9 May 1965 (age 61)
- Place of birth: Mirandópolis, Brazil
- Position: Defender

Team information
- Current team: ABECAT (head coach)

Senior career*
Years	Team	Apps	(Gls)
1988	Coritiba		
1989–1991	Ituano		
1992	Nova Andradina		
1993	Náutico		
1993–1994	Al-Riyadh		
1994	Goiatuba		
1997	Remo		
1998	URT		

Managerial career
- 2001: ECUS
- 2002–2005: Iraty U20
- 2006: ADAP
- 2006: Palmeiras B
- 2007: Coritiba
- 2007: Iraty
- 2007: Londrina
- 2007: Puntarenas
- 2007–2008: Matsubara
- 2008: Nacional-PR
- 2008–2009: Londrina
- 2009–2011: Iraty
- 2011: Cascavel
- 2011: Goiânia
- 2011: Cianorte
- 2011–2012: Chapecoense
- 2012: Confiança
- 2013: Atlético Goianiense
- 2014: Operário Ferroviário
- 2015: Trindade
- 2015: Anapolina
- 2015: Atlético Goianiense
- 2017: Votuporanguense
- 2017: Barra Mansa
- 2018: Itabaiana
- 2018: Iporá
- 2018: ASEEV
- 2019: Atlético Tubarão
- 2019: Iporá
- 2019: Goiatuba
- 2020: Nacional-AM
- 2020: Vitória-ES
- 2021–2022: Goiatuba
- 2022–2023: Inhumas
- 2023: Dom Bosco
- 2023–2024: Anapolina
- 2024: Atlético Goianiense U20
- 2025: Independente-PA
- 2026: CEOV
- 2026–: ABECAT
- * Club domestic league appearances and goals

Gilberto Pereira dos Santos, usually known as Gilberto Pereira (born 9 May 1965 in Mirandópolis), is a Brazilian football coach and former player who played as a defender. He is the current head coach of ABECAT.

== Honours ==
=== Player ===
Ituano

- Campeonato Paulista Série A2: 1989

Nova Andradina

- Campeonato Sul-Mato-Grossense: 1992

Al-Riyadh

- Saudi Professional League: 1993-94
- Saudi Crown Prince Cup: 1993-94

Remo

- Campeonato Paraense: 1997

=== Manager ===
Iraty

- Copa Tribuna U-20: 2003, 2004
- Campeonato Paranaense U-20: 2005
