= 2026 Campeonato Brasileiro Série D =

2026 Brazilian soccer competition

Campeonato Brasileiro Série D
- Season: 2026
- Dates: 4 April – 13 September
- Champions: Uberlândia (1st title)
- Promoted: ABC; ASA; Gama; Goiatuba; Nacional; Uberlândia
- Matches: 610
- Goals: 1,389 (2.28 per match)
- Top goalscorer: Felipe Clemente; Rian Santana (11 goals each)
- Biggest home win: Porto Velho 13–0 Humaitá; Group A2, R10, 14 June
- Biggest away win: Humaitá 0–7 Araguaína; Group A2, R6, 10 May
- Highest scoring: 13 goals Porto Velho 13–0 Humaitá; Group A2, R10, 14 June

The 2026 Campeonato Brasileiro Série D (officially the Brasileirão Série D ZeroUm 2026 for sponsorship reasons) was a football competition to be held in Brazil, equivalent to the fourth division. It began on 4 April and ended on 13 September.

Ninety-six teams competed in the tournament.

== Format changes ==
On 1 October 2025, CBF announced a format change to the Série D, expanding the competition from 64 teams to 96. Due to this expansion, the 32 teams qualified to the second stage of the 2025 edition were automatically qualified, and as four of those teams were promoted to the 2026 Série C, the confederation added one further spot to four regional federations based on the CBF State Ranking.

CBF also established four new criteria of qualification:

- Criteria 1: Teams relegated from the 2025 Série C;
- Criteria 2: Teams qualified through the state leagues and state cups;
- Criteria 3: Teams qualified to the second stage of the 2025 Série D;
- Criteria 4: Best-placed teams in the CBF Club Ranking not qualified to any national division.

All of those criteria overlap each other, with criteria 1 being the most important one. If a team qualify to the 2026 Série D through criteria 2 and 3, their spot will be filled by the criteria 4, independent of their state.

Six teams are promoted instead of the previous four, with the competition beginning in the first stage with 16 groups of six teams each. The four best teams qualify to the second stage in a knockout format, which prevails until the finals. The 32 teams qualified from the second stage are also qualified to the 2027 Série D (excluding the six promoted teams), and the four teams qualified to the semifinals are promoted to the 2027 Série C, with the four teams eliminated in the quarterfinals playing a play-off stage to define the other two teams promoted to the third division.

The winners of the competition qualify directly to the third stage of the 2027 Copa do Brasil.

== Teams ==
Location of teams in 2026 Série D

=== Federation ranking ===
The number of teams from each state was chosen based on the CBF State Ranking. They are displayed in bold in the C2 column.

Rank	Federation	Coeff.	C1	C2	C3	C4	Tot
1	(São Paulo (state)) São Paulo	93,528	0	4	1	0	5
2	(Rio de Janeiro (state)) Rio de Janeiro	61,308	0	3	1	2	6
3	Minas Gerais	41,451	1	3	0	1	5
4	Rio Grande do Sul	39,283	0	3	1	0	4
5	(Paraná (state)) Paraná	31,792	0	3	1	0	4
6	Ceará	24,954	0	3	0	2	5
7	Goiás	24,148	0	3	2	0	5
8	(Santa Catarina (state)) Santa Catarina	23,938	0	3	1	0	4
9	Bahia	23,642	0	3	1	0	4
10	Pernambuco	14,158	1	2	1	0	4
11	Alagoas	12,240	1	2	0	0	3
12	Pará	10,710	0	2	0	0	2
13	Mato Grosso	9,346	0	2	1	2	5
14	(Amazonas (Brazilian state)) Amazonas	6,688	0	2	1	0	3
15	Rio Grande do Norte	6,131	1	2	0	0	3
16	Paraíba	5,507	0	2	0	1	3
17	Maranhão	5,451	0	2	1	1	4
18	Sergipe	5,082	0	2	0	0	2
19	(Federal District (Brazil)) Distrito Federal	3,633	0	2	1	1	4
20	Piauí	3,545	0	2	1	1	4
21	Espírito Santo	2,623	0	2	0	1	3
22	Tocantins	2,435	0	2	0	0	2
23	(Acre (state)) Acre	2,306	0	2	0	1	3
24	Rondônia	1,648	0	2	0	0	2
25	Roraima	1,598	0	2	0	1	3
26	Mato Grosso do Sul	1,450	0	2	0	0	2
27	Amapá	1,375	0	2	0	0	2
Total			4	64	14	14	96

=== Participating teams ===
Federation	Team	Home city	Qualification method	Criteria
(Acre (state)) Acre	Independência	Rio Branco	2025 Campeonato Acreano champions	C2
(Acre (state)) Acre	Galvez	Rio Branco	2025 Campeonato Acreano runners-up	C2
(Acre (state)) Acre	Humaitá	Porto Acre	80th place in the CBF club ranking	C4
Alagoas	CSA	Maceió	2025 Série C 17th place	C1
Alagoas	ASA	Arapiraca	2025 Campeonato Alagoano runners-up	C2
Alagoas	CSE	Palmeira dos Índios	2025 Copa Alagoas champions	C2
Amapá	Trem	Macapá	2025 Campeonato Amapaense champions	C2
Amapá	Oratório	Macapá	2025 Campeonato Amapaense runners-up	C2
(Amazonas (Brazilian state)) Amazonas	Nacional	Manaus	2025 Campeonato Amazonense runners-up	C2
(Amazonas (Brazilian state)) Amazonas	Manaus	Manaus	2025 Campeonato Amazonense 3rd place	C2
(Amazonas (Brazilian state)) Amazonas	Manauara	Manaus	2025 Série D 13th place	C3
Bahia	Jacuipense	Riachão do Jacuípe	2025 Campeonato Baiano 3rd place	C2
Bahia	Atlético de Alagoinhas	Alagoinhas	2025 Campeonato Baiano 4th place	C2
Bahia	Porto	Porto Seguro	2025 Campeonato Baiano 5th place	C2
Bahia	Juazeirense	Juazeiro	2025 Série D 24th place	C3
Ceará	Maracanã	Maracanaú	2025 Campeonato Cearense 3rd place	C2
Ceará	Ferroviário	Fortaleza	2025 Campeonato Cearense 4th place	C2
Ceará	Tirol	Fortaleza	2025 Campeonato Cearense 5th place	C2
Ceará	Atlético Cearense	Fortaleza	101st place in the CBF club ranking	C4
Ceará	Iguatu	Iguatu	91st place in the CBF club ranking	C4
Espírito Santo	Rio Branco	Cariacica	2025 Campeonato Capixaba champions	C2
Espírito Santo	Vitória	Vitória	2025 Copa ES champions	C2
Espírito Santo	Real Noroeste	Águia Branca	96th place in the CBF club ranking	C4
(Federal District (Brazil)) Federal District	Gama	Gama	2025 Campeonato Brasiliense champions	C2
(Federal District (Brazil)) Federal District	Capital	Paranoá	2025 Campeonato Brasiliense runners-up	C2
(Federal District (Brazil)) Federal District	Ceilândia	Ceilândia	2025 Série D 11th place	C3
(Federal District (Brazil)) Federal District	Brasiliense	Taguatinga	73rd place in the CBF club ranking	C4
Goiás	CRAC	Catalão	2025 Campeonato Goiano 5th place	C2
Goiás	ABECAT	Ouvidor	2025 Campeonato Goiano 6th place	C2
Goiás	Inhumas	Inhumas	2025 Campeonato Goiano 7th place	C2
Goiás	Goiatuba	Goiatuba	2025 Série D 8th place	C3
Goiás	Aparecidense	Aparecida de Goiânia	2025 Série D 9th place	C3
Maranhão	Imperatriz	Imperatriz	2025 Campeonato Maranhense runners-up	C2
Maranhão	IAPE	São Luís	2025 Campeonato Maranhense 3rd place	C2
Maranhão	Sampaio Corrêa	São Luís	2025 Série D 27th place	C3
Maranhão	Moto Club	São Luís	106th place in the CBF club ranking	C4
Mato Grosso	Primavera	Primavera do Leste	2025 Campeonato Mato-Grossense runners-up	C2
Mato Grosso	Mixto	Cuiabá	2025 Campeonato Mato-Grossense 3rd place	C2
Mato Grosso	Luverdense	Lucas do Rio Verde	2025 Série D 21st place	C3
Mato Grosso	CEOV	Várzea Grande	102nd place in the CBF club ranking	C4
Mato Grosso	União Rondonópolis	Rondonópolis	92nd place in the CBF club ranking	C4
Mato Grosso do Sul	Operário	Campo Grande	2025 Campeonato Sul-Mato-Grossense champions	C2
Mato Grosso do Sul	Ivinhema	Ivinhema	2025 Campeonato Sul-Mato-Grossense runners-up	C2
Minas Gerais	Tombense	Tombos	2025 Série C 20th place	C1
Minas Gerais	Uberlândia	Uberlândia	2025 Campeonato Mineiro 6th place	C2
Minas Gerais	Betim	Betim	2025 Campeonato Mineiro 7th place	C2
Minas Gerais	Democrata GV	Governador Valadares	2025 Campeonato Mineiro 8th place	C2
Minas Gerais	Pouso Alegre	Pouso Alegre	76th place in the CBF club ranking	C4
Pará	Tuna Luso	Belém	2025 Campeonato Paraense 3rd place	C2
Pará	Águia de Marabá	Marabá	2025 Campeonato Paraense 4th place	C2
Paraíba	Sousa	Sousa	2025 Campeonato Paraibano champions	C2
Paraíba	Serra Branca	Cajazeiras	2025 Campeonato Paraibano 3rd place	C2
Paraíba	Treze	Campina Grande	100th place in the CBF club ranking	C4
(Paraná (state)) Paraná	Cianorte	Cianorte	2025 Campeonato Paranaense 6th place	C2
(Paraná (state)) Paraná	Azuriz	Marmeleiro	2025 Campeonato Paranaense 7th place	C2
(Paraná (state)) Paraná	São Joseense	São José dos Pinhais	2025 Campeonato Paranaense 8th place	C2
(Paraná (state)) Paraná	FC Cascavel	Cascavel	2025 Série D 30th place	C3
Pernambuco	Retrô	Camaragibe	2025 Série C 19th place	C1
Pernambuco	Maguary	Bonito	2025 Campeonato Pernambucano 4th place	C2
Pernambuco	Decisão	Goiana	2025 Campeonato Pernambucano 6th place	C2
Pernambuco	Central	Caruaru	2025 Série D 14th place	C3
Piauí	Piauí	Teresina	2025 Campeonato Piauiense champions	C2
Piauí	Fluminense	Teresina	2025 Campeonato Piauiense runners-up	C2
Piauí	Altos	Altos	2025 Série D 10th place	C3
Piauí	Parnahyba	Parnaíba	144th place in the CBF club ranking	C4
(Rio de Janeiro (state)) Rio de Janeiro	Sampaio Corrêa-RJ	Saquarema	2025 Campeonato Carioca 5th place	C2
(Rio de Janeiro (state)) Rio de Janeiro	Madureira	Rio de Janeiro	2025 Campeonato Carioca 6th place	C2
(Rio de Janeiro (state)) Rio de Janeiro	America	Rio de Janeiro	2025 Copa Rio runners-up	C2
(Rio de Janeiro (state)) Rio de Janeiro	Maricá	Maricá	2025 Série D 31st place	C3
(Rio de Janeiro (state)) Rio de Janeiro	Nova Iguaçu	Nova Iguaçu	66th place in the CBF club ranking	C4
(Rio de Janeiro (state)) Rio de Janeiro	Portuguesa-RJ	Rio de Janeiro	78th place in the CBF club ranking	C4
Rio Grande do Norte	ABC	Natal	2025 Série C 18th place	C1
Rio Grande do Norte	América de Natal	Natal	2025 Campeonato Potiguar champions	C2
Rio Grande do Norte	Laguna	Tibau do Sul	2025 Campeonato Potiguar 3rd place	C2
Rio Grande do Sul	São Luiz	Ijuí	2025 Campeonato Gaúcho 6th place	C2
Rio Grande do Sul	Guarany de Bagé	Bagé	2025 Campeonato Gaúcho 7th place	C2
Rio Grande do Sul	Brasil de Pelotas	Pelotas	2025 Copa FGF champions	C2
Rio Grande do Sul	São José	Porto Alegre	2025 Série D 19th place	C3
Rondônia	Porto Velho	Porto Velho	2025 Campeonato Rondoniense champions	C2
Rondônia	Guaporé	Rolim de Moura	2025 Campeonato Rondoniense runners-up	C2
Roraima	GAS	Boa Vista	2025 Campeonato Roraimense champions	C2
Roraima	Monte Roraima	Boa Vista	2025 Campeonato Roraimense runners-up	C2
Roraima	São Raimundo	Boa Vista	88th place in the CBF club ranking	C4
(Santa Catarina (state)) Santa Catarina	Santa Catarina	Rio do Sul	2025 Campeonato Catarinense 3rd place	C2
(Santa Catarina (state)) Santa Catarina	Joinville	Joinville	2025 Campeonato Catarinense 4th place	C2
(Santa Catarina (state)) Santa Catarina	Blumenau	Blumenau	2025 Copa Santa Catarina 3rd place	C2
(Santa Catarina (state)) Santa Catarina	Marcílio Dias	Itajaí	2025 Série D 28th place	C3
(São Paulo (state)) São Paulo	Velo Clube	Rio Claro	2025 Campeonato Paulista 11th place	C2
(São Paulo (state)) São Paulo	Portuguesa	São Paulo	2025 Campeonato Paulista 12th place	C2
(São Paulo (state)) São Paulo	Noroeste	Bauru	2025 Campeonato Paulista 14th place	C2
(São Paulo (state)) São Paulo	XV de Piracicaba	Piracicaba	2025 Copa Paulista champions	C2
(São Paulo (state)) São Paulo	Água Santa	Diadema	2025 Série D 25th place	C3
Sergipe	Lagarto	Lagarto	2025 Campeonato Sergipano 3rd place	C2
Sergipe	Sergipe	Aracaju	2025 Copa Governo do Estado de Sergipe runners-up	C2
Tocantins	Araguaína	Araguaína	2025 Campeonato Tocantinense champions	C2
Tocantins	Tocantinópolis	Tocantinópolis	2025 Campeonato Tocantinense runners-up	C2

== Format ==
During the group stage, the 96 teams were divided into 16 groups of six, organised regionally. The top four teams from each group qualified for the round of 64. From this point onwards, the competition was played as a knockout tournament, with each round contested over two legs.

== Group stage ==
In the group stage, each group was played on a home-and-away round-robin basis. The teams were ranked according to points (3 points for a win, 1 point for a draw, and 0 points for a loss). If tied on points, the following criteria would be used to determine the ranking: 1. Wins; 2. Goal difference; 3. Goals scored; 4. Head-to-head (if the tie was only between two teams); 5. Fewest red cards; 6. Fewest yellow cards; 7. Draw in the headquarters of the Brazilian Football Confederation (Regulations Article 16). The top four teams qualified for the round of 64.

CBF published the 16 groups of six teams each on 6 March 2026.

=== Group A1 ===
Pos	Team	Pld	W	D	L	GF	GA	GD	Pts	Qualification	MNA	NAC	SRA	MRO	MAN	GAS
1	(Amazonas (Brazilian state)) Manauara	10	6	4	0	13	5	+8	22	Advance to round of 64		4–2	1–0	2–0	1–1	0–0
2	(Amazonas (Brazilian state)) Nacional	10	6	2	2	15	9	+6	20	Advance to round of 64	0–1		0–0	3–1	2–0	3–2
3	(Roraima) São Raimundo	10	3	4	3	10	7	+3	13	Advance to round of 64	0–0	0–2		1–1	0–1	4–0
4	Monte Roraima	10	2	4	4	11	14	−3	10	Advance to round of 64	0–1	0–1	2–2		2–2	0–0
5	(Amazonas (Brazilian state)) Manaus	10	2	4	4	8	13	−5	10		1–1	1–1	0–1	0–2		1–0
6	(Roraima) GAS	10	1	2	7	8	17	−9	5		1–2	0–1	0–2	2–3	3–1	

Source: CBF
Legend: Blue = home team win; Yellow = draw; Red = away team win.
Rules for classification: 1) points; 2) wins; 3) goal difference; 4) goals scored; 5) head-to-head results (only between 2 teams); 6) fewest red cards; 7) fewest yellow cards; 8) draw.

=== Group A2 ===
Pos	Team	Pld	W	D	L	GF	GA	GD	Pts	Qualification	GUA	PVE	ARA	IND	GAL	HUM
1	(Rondônia) Guaporé	10	6	4	0	19	9	+10	22	Advance to round of 64		1–0	3–2	1–0	1–0	3–1
2	(Rondônia) Porto Velho	10	5	3	2	33	9	+24	18	Advance to round of 64	0–0		1–2	2–1	4–0	13–0
3	(Tocantins) Araguaína	10	5	3	2	31	9	+22	18	Advance to round of 64	1–1	1–1		1–1	9–0	6–0
4	(Acre (state)) Independência	10	4	3	3	17	10	+7	15	Advance to round of 64	2–2	1–1	1–0		3–1	3–0
5	(Acre (state)) Galvez	10	3	1	6	14	31	−17	10		3–3	2–6	1–2	2–1		4–2
6	(Acre (state)) Humaitá	10	0	0	10	4	50	−46	0		0–4	1–5	0–7	0–4	0–1	

Source: CBF
Legend: Blue = home team win; Yellow = draw; Red = away team win.
Rules for classification: 1) points; 2) wins; 3) goal difference; 4) goals scored; 5) head-to-head results (only between 2 teams); 6) fewest red cards; 7) fewest yellow cards; 8) draw.

=== Group A3 ===
Pos	Team	Pld	W	D	L	GF	GA	GD	Pts	Qualification	GAM	LUV	BRA	APA	PRI	INH
1	(Federal District (Brazil)) Gama	10	8	2	0	23	6	+17	26	Advance to round of 64		4–0	3–2	2–2	4–0	2–0
2	(Mato Grosso) Luverdense	10	4	3	3	11	10	+1	15	Advance to round of 64	1–2		0–0	1–0	1–1	4–0
3	(Federal District (Brazil)) Brasiliense	10	3	5	2	11	10	+1	14	Advance to round of 64	1–1	1–1		1–1	1–1	1–0
4	(Goiás) Aparecidense	10	3	4	3	13	12	+1	13	Advance to round of 64	0–2	0–1	2–1		1–1	3–1
5	(Mato Grosso) Primavera	10	3	3	4	10	13	−3	12		0–1	1–0	1–2	1–3		2–0
6	(Goiás) Inhumas	10	0	1	9	3	20	−17	1		0–2	1–2	0–1	1–1	0–2	

Source: CBF
Legend: Blue = home team win; Yellow = draw; Red = away team win.
Rules for classification: 1) points; 2) wins; 3) goal difference; 4) goals scored; 5) head-to-head results (only between 2 teams); 6) fewest red cards; 7) fewest yellow cards; 8) draw.

=== Group A4 ===
Pos	Team	Pld	W	D	L	GF	GA	GD	Pts	Qualification	CAP	GOI	CEI	MIX	UNI	CEO
1	(Federal District (Brazil)) Capital	10	7	2	1	16	6	+10	23	Advance to round of 64		0–1	2–1	1–0	2–0	1–0
2	(Goiás) Goiatuba	10	5	4	1	13	7	+6	19	Advance to round of 64	1–1		1–0	1–0	5–1	1–0
3	(Federal District (Brazil)) Ceilândia	10	3	3	4	9	10	−1	12	Advance to round of 64	1–2	1–1		0–0	1–0	0–1
4	(Mato Grosso) Mixto	10	2	6	2	10	9	+1	12	Advance to round of 64	1–1	2–0	1–1		2–2	1–1
5	(Mato Grosso) União Rondonópolis	10	2	3	5	11	18	−7	9		0–1	0–0	2–3	2–2		2–1
6	(Mato Grosso) CEOV	10	1	2	7	7	16	−9	5		1–5	2–2	0–1	0–1	1–2	

Source: CBF
Legend: Blue = home team win; Yellow = draw; Red = away team win.
Rules for classification: 1) points; 2) wins; 3) goal difference; 4) goals scored; 5) head-to-head results (only between 2 teams); 6) fewest red cards; 7) fewest yellow cards; 8) draw.

=== Group A5 ===
Pos	Team	Pld	W	D	L	GF	GA	GD	Pts	Qualification	TRE	AGU	IMP	TUN	TOC	ORA
1	(Amapá) Trem	10	6	2	2	19	13	+6	20	Advance to round of 64		2–0	2–1	3–3	4–1	4–2
2	(Pará) Águia de Marabá	10	5	3	2	20	11	+9	18	Advance to round of 64	1–1		1–1	2–0	3–1	5–1
3	(Maranhão) Imperatriz	10	4	3	3	15	10	+5	15	Advance to round of 64	4–0	0–3		4–0	1–1	3–1
4	(Pará) Tuna Luso	10	3	4	3	14	17	−3	13	Advance to round of 64	1–0	2–1	0–0		2–3	2–0
5	(Tocantins) Tocantinópolis	10	3	3	4	18	18	0	12		0–1	2–2	2–0	1–1		7–1
6	(Amapá) Oratório	10	1	1	8	12	29	−17	4		0–2	1–2	0–1	3–3	3–0	

Source: CBF
Legend: Blue = home team win; Yellow = draw; Red = away team win.
Rules for classification: 1) points; 2) wins; 3) goal difference; 4) goals scored; 5) head-to-head results (only between 2 teams); 6) fewest red cards; 7) fewest yellow cards; 8) draw.

=== Group A6 ===
Pos	Team	Pld	W	D	L	GF	GA	GD	Pts	Qualification	IGU	MAR	PAR	SAM	MOT	IAP
1	(Ceará) Iguatu	10	5	5	0	14	7	+7	20	Advance to round of 64		1–0	2–2	0–0	3–1	3–2
2	(Ceará) Maracanã	10	5	4	1	12	6	+6	19	Advance to round of 64	1–1		1–0	1–1	2–0	2–0
3	(Piauí) Parnahyba	10	4	2	4	11	13	−2	14	Advance to round of 64	0–2	0–1		1–0	1–0	3–1
4	(Maranhão) Sampaio Corrêa	10	3	4	3	12	6	+6	13	Advance to round of 64	0–1	0–0	4–1		4–0	0–0
5	(Maranhão) Moto Club	10	2	3	5	8	15	−7	9		0–0	1–2	1–1	1–0		2–2
6	(Maranhão) IAPE	10	0	4	6	10	20	−10	4		1–1	2–2	1–2	1–3	0–2	

Source: CBF
Legend: Blue = home team win; Yellow = draw; Red = away team win.
Rules for classification: 1) points; 2) wins; 3) goal difference; 4) goals scored; 5) head-to-head results (only between 2 teams); 6) fewest red cards; 7) fewest yellow cards; 8) draw.

=== Group A7 ===
Pos	Team	Pld	W	D	L	GF	GA	GD	Pts	Qualification	FER	PIA	FLU	ALT	TIR	ATL
1	(Ceará) Ferroviário	10	6	3	1	15	7	+8	21	Advance to round of 64		2–1	1–0	3–1	3–2	2–0
2	Piauí	10	5	2	3	14	11	+3	17	Advance to round of 64	1–1		0–1	3–1	2–1	1–1
3	(Piauí) Fluminense	10	3	5	2	12	9	+3	14	Advance to round of 64	1–1	3–2		1–1	0–0	1–2
4	(Piauí) Altos	10	3	2	5	9	15	−6	11	Advance to round of 64	1–0	0–1	0–3		2–1	3–2
5	(Ceará) Tirol	10	2	4	4	10	10	0	10		0–0	1–2	1–1	1–0		0–0
6	(Ceará) Atlético Cearense	10	1	4	5	6	14	−8	7		0–2	0–1	1–1	0–0	0–3	

Source: CBF
Legend: Blue = home team win; Yellow = draw; Red = away team win.
Rules for classification: 1) points; 2) wins; 3) goal difference; 4) goals scored; 5) head-to-head results (only between 2 teams); 6) fewest red cards; 7) fewest yellow cards; 8) draw.

=== Group A8 ===
Pos	Team	Pld	W	D	L	GF	GA	GD	Pts	Qualification	ABC	AME	MAG	CEN	SOU	LAG
1	(Rio Grande do Norte) ABC	10	7	2	1	15	6	+9	23	Advance to round of 64		1–1	1–0	1–1	2–0	4–0
2	(Rio Grande do Norte) América de Natal	10	6	3	1	14	3	+11	21	Advance to round of 64	1–2		0–0	1–0	2–0	5–0
3	(Pernambuco) Maguary	10	3	4	3	8	5	+3	13	Advance to round of 64	3–0	0–0		0–2	2–0	2–0
4	(Pernambuco) Central	10	3	4	3	8	7	+1	13	Advance to round of 64	0–1	0–1	0–0		2–1	2–1
5	(Paraíba) Sousa	10	3	1	6	4	11	−7	10		0–1	0–2	1–0	0–0		1–0
6	(Rio Grande do Norte) Laguna	10	0	2	8	3	20	−17	2		0–2	0–1	1–1	1–1	0–1	

Source: CBF
Legend: Blue = home team win; Yellow = draw; Red = away team win.
Rules for classification: 1) points; 2) wins; 3) goal difference; 4) goals scored; 5) head-to-head results (only between 2 teams); 6) fewest red cards; 7) fewest yellow cards; 8) draw.

=== Group A9 ===
Pos	Team	Pld	W	D	L	GF	GA	GD	Pts	Qualification	TRE	SER	SBR	LAG	RET	DEC
1	(Paraíba) Treze	10	5	2	3	18	14	+4	17	Advance to round of 64		3–1	1–1	1–2	3–0	2–0
2	Sergipe	10	4	3	3	15	13	+2	15	Advance to round of 64	0–1		1–1	3–1	1–0	2–1
3	(Paraíba) Serra Branca	10	3	6	1	12	8	+4	15	Advance to round of 64	1–2	1–1		0–0	0–0	3–0
4	(Sergipe) Lagarto	10	3	4	3	14	15	−1	13	Advance to round of 64	5–4	1–1	1–2		1–2	1–0
5	(Pernambuco) Retrô	10	3	3	4	13	15	−2	12		3–0	1–3	2–2	1–1		2–1
6	(Pernambuco) Decisão	10	2	2	6	10	17	−7	8		1–1	3–2	0–1	1–1	3–2	

Source: CBF
Legend: Blue = home team win; Yellow = draw; Red = away team win.
Rules for classification: 1) points; 2) wins; 3) goal difference; 4) goals scored; 5) head-to-head results (only between 2 teams); 6) fewest red cards; 7) fewest yellow cards; 8) draw.

=== Group A10 ===
Pos	Team	Pld	W	D	L	GF	GA	GD	Pts	Qualification	CSA	JUA	ASA	JAC	CSE	ATL
1	(Alagoas) CSA	10	6	3	1	25	8	+17	21	Advance to round of 64		2–0	1–1	1–1	1–1	3–0
2	(Bahia) Juazeirense	10	5	2	3	12	9	+3	17	Advance to round of 64	0–1		1–0	3–1	3–1	0–0
3	(Alagoas) ASA	10	4	4	2	11	7	+4	16	Advance to round of 64	2–1	1–0		0–0	0–0	3–0
4	(Bahia) Jacuipense	10	3	4	3	12	14	−2	13	Advance to round of 64	1–3	2–2	1–1		2–1	1–0
5	(Alagoas) CSE	10	2	3	5	10	17	−7	9		1–5	0–1	1–2	3–2		0–0
6	(Bahia) Atlético de Alagoinhas	10	1	2	7	5	20	−15	5		1–7	1–2	2–1	0–1	1–2	

Source: CBF
Legend: Blue = home team win; Yellow = draw; Red = away team win.
Rules for classification: 1) points; 2) wins; 3) goal difference; 4) goals scored; 5) head-to-head results (only between 2 teams); 6) fewest red cards; 7) fewest yellow cards; 8) draw.

=== Group A11 ===
Pos	Team	Pld	W	D	L	GF	GA	GD	Pts	Qualification	UBE	BET	CRA	IVI	ABE	OPE
1	(Minas Gerais) Uberlândia	10	5	3	2	12	8	+4	18	Advance to round of 64		1–1	2–1	1–2	0–1	2–1
2	(Minas Gerais) Betim	10	4	3	3	12	9	+3	15	Advance to round of 64	0–2		0–0	3–0	1–0	2–1
3	(Goiás) CRAC	10	3	4	3	7	7	0	13	Advance to round of 64	0–0	1–0		1–1	2–1	0–0
4	(Mato Grosso do Sul) Ivinhema	10	3	4	3	9	12	−3	13	Advance to round of 64	1–1	1–3	1–0		0–0	2–0
5	(Goiás) ABECAT	10	3	3	4	8	9	−1	12		0–1	2–1	0–2	1–1		2–0
6	(Mato Grosso do Sul) Operário	10	2	3	5	9	12	−3	9		1–2	1–1	2–0	2–0	1–1	

Source: CBF
Legend: Blue = home team win; Yellow = draw; Red = away team win.
Rules for classification: 1) points; 2) wins; 3) goal difference; 4) goals scored; 5) head-to-head results (only between 2 teams); 6) fewest red cards; 7) fewest yellow cards; 8) draw.

=== Group A12 ===
Pos	Team	Pld	W	D	L	GF	GA	GD	Pts	Qualification	DEM	TOM	VIT	RBR	POR	RNO
1	(Minas Gerais) Democrata GV	10	5	2	3	13	9	+4	17	Advance to round of 64		1–0	2–0	3–1	3–1	1–0
2	(Minas Gerais) Tombense	10	4	5	1	13	6	+7	17	Advance to round of 64	3–1		0–0	0–0	3–0	1–1
3	(Espírito Santo) Vitória	10	4	3	3	12	8	+4	15	Advance to round of 64	2–1	0–1		1–2	3–0	1–1
4	(Espírito Santo) Rio Branco	10	3	4	3	14	12	+2	13	Advance to round of 64	1–1	2–2	0–2		4–0	2–0
5	(Bahia) Porto	10	3	1	6	9	21	−12	10		1–0	1–3	0–0	3–2		1–2
6	(Espírito Santo) Real Noroeste	10	1	5	4	6	11	−5	8		0–0	0–0	1–3	0–0	1–2	

Source: CBF
Legend: Blue = home team win; Yellow = draw; Red = away team win.
Rules for classification: 1) points; 2) wins; 3) goal difference; 4) goals scored; 5) head-to-head results (only between 2 teams); 6) fewest red cards; 7) fewest yellow cards; 8) draw.

=== Group A13 ===
Pos	Team	Pld	W	D	L	GF	GA	GD	Pts	Qualification	POR	AGS	PRJ	AME	MAD	POU
1	(São Paulo (state)) Portuguesa	10	6	3	1	16	6	+10	21	Advance to round of 64		0–0	2–0	4–1	2–1	3–0
2	(São Paulo (state)) Água Santa	10	5	2	3	16	8	+8	17	Advance to round of 64	0–1		1–0	4–0	4–1	2–0
3	(Rio de Janeiro (state)) Portuguesa	10	3	5	2	14	9	+5	14	Advance to round of 64	1–1	2–2		2–2	0–0	2–0
4	(Rio de Janeiro (state)) America	10	3	3	4	11	21	−10	12	Advance to round of 64	1–1	1–0	0–4		3–1	0–0
5	(Rio de Janeiro (state)) Madureira	10	3	2	5	11	16	−5	11		1–0	3–1	1–1	2–3		1–0
6	(Minas Gerais) Pouso Alegre	10	2	1	7	6	14	−8	7		1–2	0–2	0–2	3–0	2–0	

Source: CBF
Legend: Blue = home team win; Yellow = draw; Red = away team win.
Rules for classification: 1) points; 2) wins; 3) goal difference; 4) goals scored; 5) head-to-head results (only between 2 teams); 6) fewest red cards; 7) fewest yellow cards; 8) draw.

=== Group A14 ===
Pos	Team	Pld	W	D	L	GF	GA	GD	Pts	Qualification	XVP	NOR	VEL	SAM	NIG	MAR
1	(São Paulo (state)) XV de Piracicaba	10	4	5	1	14	9	+5	17	Advance to round of 64		1–1	1–1	1–0	4–1	1–0
2	(São Paulo (state)) Noroeste	10	4	3	3	12	7	+5	15	Advance to round of 64	2–2		3–0	1–0	1–1	1–0
3	(São Paulo (state)) Velo Clube	10	3	4	3	10	10	0	13	Advance to round of 64	1–1	1–0		2–0	1–1	3–1
4	(Rio de Janeiro (state)) Sampaio Corrêa	10	3	3	4	8	10	−2	12	Advance to round of 64	1–1	1–0	1–0		1–0	1–1
5	(Rio de Janeiro (state)) Nova Iguaçu	10	3	3	4	7	10	−3	12		1–0	1–0	0–0	2–1		0–1
6	(Rio de Janeiro (state)) Maricá	10	3	2	5	9	14	−5	11		1–2	0–3	2–1	2–2	1–0	

Source: CBF
Legend: Blue = home team win; Yellow = draw; Red = away team win.
Rules for classification: 1) points; 2) wins; 3) goal difference; 4) goals scored; 5) head-to-head results (only between 2 teams); 6) fewest red cards; 7) fewest yellow cards; 8) draw.

=== Group A15 ===
Pos	Team	Pld	W	D	L	GF	GA	GD	Pts	Qualification	SCA	CIA	FCC	SLU	JEC	GUA
1	(Santa Catarina (state)) Santa Catarina	10	6	1	3	15	9	+6	19	Advance to round of 64		1–0	1–0	1–0	1–0	3–0
2	(Paraná (state)) Cianorte	10	5	1	4	9	8	+1	16	Advance to round of 64	1–3		1–0	0–1	1–2	3–1
3	(Paraná (state)) FC Cascavel	10	4	3	3	9	4	+5	15	Advance to round of 64	1–0	0–1		0–0	1–0	2–0
4	(Rio Grande do Sul) São Luiz	10	4	3	3	11	9	+2	15	Advance to round of 64	4–4	0–1	0–0		3–1	2–0
5	(Santa Catarina (state)) Joinville	10	4	3	3	10	8	+2	15		2–1	0–0	1–1	2–0		2–0
6	(Rio Grande do Sul) Guarany de Bagé	10	1	1	8	2	18	−16	4		1–0	0–1	0–4	0–1	0–0	

Source: CBF
Legend: Blue = home team win; Yellow = draw; Red = away team win.
Rules for classification: 1) points; 2) wins; 3) goal difference; 4) goals scored; 5) head-to-head results (only between 2 teams); 6) fewest red cards; 7) fewest yellow cards; 8) draw.

=== Group A16 ===
Pos	Team	Pld	W	D	L	GF	GA	GD	Pts	Qualification	BLU	MAR	SJS	SJO	BPE	AZU
1	(Santa Catarina (state)) Blumenau	10	6	1	3	14	8	+6	19	Advance to round of 64		0–1	0–0	0–1	3–2	1–0
2	(Santa Catarina (state)) Marcílio Dias	10	4	4	2	9	5	+4	16	Advance to round of 64	0–1		0–0	2–1	4–1	0–1
3	(Paraná (state)) São Joseense	10	3	4	3	3	4	−1	13	Advance to round of 64	1–0	0–0		1–0	0–0	0–1
4	(Rio Grande do Sul) São José	10	3	4	3	6	8	−2	13	Advance to round of 64	0–3	1–1	1–0		0–0	1–0
5	(Rio Grande do Sul) Brasil de Pelotas	10	2	4	4	9	12	−3	10		1–2	0–1	2–0	0–0		2–1
6	(Paraná (state)) Azuriz	10	2	3	5	7	11	−4	9		2–4	0–0	0–1	1–1	1–1	

Source: CBF
Legend: Blue = home team win; Yellow = draw; Red = away team win.
Rules for classification: 1) points; 2) wins; 3) goal difference; 4) goals scored; 5) head-to-head results (only between 2 teams); 6) fewest red cards; 7) fewest yellow cards; 8) draw.

== Final stages ==
The final stages were played on a home-and-away two-legged basis. For the round of 32, round of 16, semi-finals, and finals, the team with the best overall performance hosted the second leg. For the quarter-finals and the promotion play-offs, teams were seeded based on the table of results of all matches in the competition. The top seeded teams hosted the second leg.

Except for the promotion play-offs, if teams were tied on aggregate at any stage, the away goals rule would not be used and extra time would not be played. Instead, a penalty shoot-out would be used to determine the winners (Regulations Article 17). In the promotion play-offs, if teams were tied on aggregate, the winners would be declared based on their overall performance (Regulations Article 21).

The four semifinalists and the two promotion play-offs winners were promoted to 2027 Série C.

=== Round of 64 ===
The round of 64 was a two-legged knockout tie, with the draw regionalised. The matches were played from 20 to 29 June.

==== Matches ====
Team 1	Agg.	Team 2	1st leg	2nd leg
Independência (Acre (state))	1–3	(Amazonas (Brazilian state)) Manauara	0–2	1–1
São Raimundo (Roraima)	2–2 (6–7 p)	(Rondônia) Porto Velho	1–1	1–1
Monte Roraima	3–4	(Rondônia) Guaporé	3–2	0–2
Araguaína (Tocantins)	0–1	(Amazonas (Brazilian state)) Nacional	0–1	0–0
Mixto (Mato Grosso)	1–3	(Federal District (Brazil)) Gama	1–2	0–1
Brasiliense (Federal District (Brazil))	0–1	(Goiás) Goiatuba	0–0	0–1
Aparecidense (Goiás)	1–5	(Federal District (Brazil)) Capital	1–1	0–4
Ceilândia (Federal District (Brazil))	2–3	(Mato Grosso) Luverdense	1–2	1–1
Sampaio Corrêa (Maranhão)	2–3	(Amapá) Trem	0–2	2–1
Imperatriz (Maranhão)	1–1 (7–6 p)	(Ceará) Maracanã	1–1	0–0
Tuna Luso (Pará)	2–3	(Ceará) Iguatu	1–2	1–1
Parnahyba (Piauí)	2–3	(Pará) Águia de Marabá	2–1	0–2
Central (Pernambuco)	1–3	(Ceará) Ferroviário	1–1	0–2
Fluminense (Piauí)	0–4	(Rio Grande do Norte) América de Natal	0–3	0–1
Altos (Piauí)	1–2	(Rio Grande do Norte) ABC	0–1	1–1
Maguary (Pernambuco)	2–1	Piauí	2–0	0–1
Jacuipense (Bahia)	1–3	(Paraíba) Treze	1–3	0–0
Serra Branca (Paraíba)	3–0	(Bahia) Juazeirense	2–0	1–0
Lagarto (Sergipe)	1–3	(Alagoas) CSA	1–1	0–2
ASA (Alagoas)	2–1	Sergipe	1–1	1–0
Rio Branco (Espírito Santo)	2–4	(Minas Gerais) Uberlândia	0–2	2–2
CRAC (Goiás)	1–0	(Minas Gerais) Tombense	1–0	0–0
Ivinhema (Mato Grosso do Sul)	4–2	(Minas Gerais) Democrata GV	3–1	1–1
Vitória (Espírito Santo)	1–2	(Minas Gerais) Betim	1–0	0–2
Sampaio Corrêa (Rio de Janeiro (state))	1–2	(São Paulo (state)) Portuguesa	1–1	0–1
Portuguesa (Rio de Janeiro (state))	4–2	(São Paulo (state)) Noroeste	1–1	3–1
America (Rio de Janeiro (state))	1–3	(São Paulo (state)) XV de Piracicaba	1–1	0–2
Velo Clube (São Paulo (state))	1–1 (4–1 p)	(São Paulo (state)) Água Santa	0–0	1–1
São José (Rio Grande do Sul)	2–2 (4–2 p)	(Santa Catarina (state)) Santa Catarina	1–1	1–1
FC Cascavel (Paraná (state))	3–4	(Santa Catarina (state)) Marcílio Dias	2–2	1–2
São Luiz (Rio Grande do Sul)	2–2 (3–1 p)	(Santa Catarina (state)) Blumenau	1–1	1–1
São Joseense (Paraná (state))	1–1 (4–5 p)	(Paraná (state)) Cianorte	0–1	1–0

=== Round of 32 ===
The matches were played from 4 to 13 July.

==== Matches ====
Team 1	Agg.	Team 2	1st leg	2nd leg
Goiatuba (Goiás)	2–2 (4–3 p)	(Amazonas (Brazilian state)) Manauara	0–1	2–1
Porto Velho (Rondônia)	2–2 (4–5 p)	(Federal District (Brazil)) Gama	2–0	0–2
Luverdense (Mato Grosso)	1–0	(Rondônia) Guaporé	1–0	0–0
Nacional (Amazonas (Brazilian state))	1–1 (6–5 p)	(Federal District (Brazil)) Capital	1–0	0–1
Trem (Amapá)	2–6	(Rio Grande do Norte) América de Natal	1–4	1–2
Imperatriz (Maranhão)	1–4	(Ceará) Ferroviário	1–1	0–3
Maguary (Pernambuco)	3–5	(Ceará) Iguatu	2–3	1–2
Águia de Marabá (Pará)	2–4	(Rio Grande do Norte) ABC	2–1	0–3
CRAC (Goiás)	2–2 (3–4 p)	(Paraíba) Treze	2–1	0–1
Serra Branca (Paraíba)	2–3	(Minas Gerais) Uberlândia	0–1	2–2
Betim (Minas Gerais)	1–4	(Alagoas) CSA	1–0	0–4
Ivinhema (Mato Grosso do Sul)	1–6	(Alagoas) ASA	1–2	0–4
Marcílio Dias (Santa Catarina (state))	1–3	(São Paulo (state)) Portuguesa	1–1	0–2
São José (Rio Grande do Sul)	1–0	(Rio de Janeiro (state)) Portuguesa	1–0	0–0
Cianorte (Paraná (state))	4–0	(São Paulo (state)) XV de Piracicaba	4–0	0–0
Velo Clube (São Paulo (state))	3–3 (3–5 p)	(Rio Grande do Sul) São Luiz	2–1	1–2

=== Round of 16 ===
The matches were played from 18 to 26 July.

==== Matches ====
Team 1	Agg.	Team 2	1st leg	2nd leg
Goiatuba (Goiás)	5–1	(Ceará) Ferroviário	3–0	2–1
América de Natal (Rio Grande do Norte)	3–3 (3–4 p)	(Federal District (Brazil)) Gama	1–0	2–3
Luverdense (Mato Grosso)	1–4	(Rio Grande do Norte) ABC	0–0	1–4
Nacional (Amazonas (Brazilian state))	2–2 (5–4 p)	(Ceará) Iguatu	1–1	1–1
São José (Rio Grande do Sul)	2–2 (3–0 p)	(Paraíba) Treze	2–1	0–1
Uberlândia (Minas Gerais)	2–1	(São Paulo (state)) Portuguesa	2–0	0–1
São Luiz (Rio Grande do Sul)	1–2	(Alagoas) CSA	0–0	1–2
Cianorte (Paraná (state))	1–6	(Alagoas) ASA	0–1	1–5

=== Quarter-finals ===
The draw for the quarter-finals was seeded based on the table of results of all matches in the competition for the qualifying teams. The teams were ranked according to points. If tied on points, the following criteria would be used to determine the ranking: 1. Wins; 2. Goal difference; 3. Goals scored; 4. Fewest red cards; 5. Fewest yellow cards; 6. Draw in the headquarters of the Brazilian Football Confederation (Regulations Article 18).

==== Quarter-finals seedings ====
Seed	Team	Pts	W	GD
1	(Federal District (Brazil)) Gama	38	12	+19
2	(Rio Grande do Norte) ABC	34	10	+15
3	(Alagoas) CSA	32	9	+23
4	(Alagoas) ASA	32	9	+15
5	(Goiás) Goiatuba	32	9	+11
6	(Minas Gerais) Uberlândia	29	8	+8
7	(Amazonas (Brazilian state)) Nacional	29	8	+7
8	(Rio Grande do Sul) São José	22	5	–1

==== Matches ====
The matches were played from 8 to 16 August.

Team 1	Agg.	Team 2	1st leg	2nd leg
São José (Rio Grande do Sul)	1–5	(Federal District (Brazil)) Gama	1–1	0–4
Goiatuba (Goiás)	1–1 (4–5 p)	(Alagoas) ASA	0–0	1–1
Nacional (Amazonas (Brazilian state))	1–3	(Rio Grande do Norte) ABC	1–2	0–1
Uberlândia (Minas Gerais)	3–0	(Alagoas) CSA	1–0	2–0

=== Semi-finals ===
The matches were played from 22 to 30 August.

==== Matches ====
Team 1	Agg.	Team 2	1st leg	2nd leg
ASA (Alagoas)	2–0	(Federal District (Brazil)) Gama	2–0	0–0
Uberlândia (Minas Gerais)	2–1	(Rio Grande do Norte) ABC	1–0	1–1

=== Promotion play-offs ===
The draw for the promotion play-offs was seeded based on the table of results of all matches in the competition for the qualifying teams. The teams were ranked according to points. If tied on points, the following criteria would be used to determine the ranking: 1. Wins; 2. Goal difference; 3. Goals scored; 4. Fewest red cards; 5. Fewest yellow cards; 6. Draw in the headquarters of the Brazilian Football Confederation (Regulations Article 21).

==== Promotion play-offs seedings ====
Seed	Team	Pts	W	GD
1	(Goiás) Goiatuba	34	9	+11
2	(Alagoas) CSA	32	9	+20
3	(Amazonas (Brazilian state)) Nacional	29	8	+5
4	(Rio Grande do Sul) São José	23	5	–5

==== Matches ====
The matches were played from 26 August to 3 September.

Team 1	Agg.	Team 2	1st leg	2nd leg
São José (Rio Grande do Sul)	1–1	(Goiás) Goiatuba	0–0	1–1
Nacional (Amazonas (Brazilian state))	3–1	(Alagoas) CSA	3–1	0–0

=== Finals ===
The matches were played on 6 and 13 September.

==== Matches ====
Team 1	Agg.	Team 2	1st leg	2nd leg
ASA (Alagoas)	1–3	(Minas Gerais) Uberlândia	0–2	1–1

6 September 2026
17:00

ASA (Alagoas)	0–2	(Minas Gerais) Uberlândia
	Report	Ferreira 73' (o.g.); Jhonatan Lima 90+4'

Estádio Municipal Coaracy da Mata Fonseca, Arapiraca
Referee: Lucas Guimarães Rechatiko Horn (Rio Grande do Sul)

13 September 2026
17:00

Uberlândia (Minas Gerais)	1–1	(Alagoas) ASA
Marcos Calazans 32'	Report	Michel Douglas 22'

Estádio Parque do Sabiá, Uberlândia
Referee: Júlio Cesar Pfleger (Santa Catarina)

== Top goalscorers ==
Rank	Player	Team	Goals
1	(Brazil) Felipe Clemente	(Federal District (Brazil)) Gama	11
1	(Brazil) Rian Santana	(Alagoas) CSA	11
3	(Brazil) Kauã Maranhão	Piauí	10
3	(Brazil) Matheus Lima	(Ceará) Iguatu	10
3	(Brazil) Michel Douglas	(Alagoas) CSE/ (Alagoas) ASA	10
6	(Brazil) Alex Bruno	(Alagoas) ASA	9
6	(Brazil) Alex Silva	(Pará) Águia de Marabá	9
6	(Brazil) Ramon	(Federal District (Brazil)) Gama	9
6	(Brazil) Ruan Costa	(Rondônia) Porto Velho	9
6	(Brazil) Tomas Bastos	(Minas Gerais) Uberlândia	9

Source: CBF
