= Ivan Campanari =

Brazilian football coach (born 1991)

Personal information
- Full name: José Ivan Doreto Campanari Junior
- Date of birth: 30 October 1991 (age 34)
- Place of birth: Marília, Brazil

Team information
- Current team: Maringá (head coach)

Managerial career
- Years: Team
- 2017: Marília U20
- 2017: Penapolense U20
- 2018–2019: Linense U17
- 2021: XV Uber U17
- 2022: Cambé U20
- 2022: Nacional-PR U20
- 2022: Nacional-PR
- 2023: Maringá U15
- 2023–2026: Maringá (assistant)
- 2026–: Maringá

José Ivan Doreto Campanari Junior (born 30 October 1991) is a Brazilian football coach, currently the head coach of Maringá.

== Career ==
Born in Marília, São Paulo, Campanari was an assistant of William Sander in the under-20 squad of Marília AC, but became the head coach of the category after Sander left for Novorizontino. He was later in charge of Penapolense's under-20s in 2017, and later worked in the under-17 team of Linense.

In 2021, after working in a social project, Campanari was the head coach of the under-17 squad of XV de Uberlândia. In 2022, he worked in the under-20 teams of Cambé and Nacional-PR, being also in charge of the latter's first team in the Campeonato Paranaense Third Division.

Campanari moved to Maringá in 2023, being head coach of the under-15s, before being promoted to the main squad in November of that year, as an assistant. On 13 August 2026, he was named head coach of the club for the remainder of the year, replacing sacked Moisés Egert.

== Honours ==
Maringá

- Campeonato Brasileiro Série C: 2026
