= Alberto Félix =

Alberto Félix may refer to:

- Alberto Félix (footballer) (born 1966), Brazilian football coach and former player
- Alberto Félix (pentathlete) (born 1969), Mexican modern pentathlete
