= Ricardo Resende =

Brazilian football coach

Personal information
- Full name: Ricardo Alves Resende
- Date of birth: 3 July 1980 (age 46)
- Place of birth: Belo Horizonte, Brazil

Team information
- Current team: Confiança (assistant)

Youth career
- Years: Team
- Atlético Mineiro (futsal)
- América Mineiro

Managerial career
- 2007: Atlético Mineiro U13
- 2008: Atlético Mineiro U14
- 2009–2012: Atlético Mineiro U15
- 2013–2016: Atlético Mineiro U17
- 2017: Atlético Mineiro U20
- 2018–2019: Cruzeiro U20
- 2019: Cruzeiro (interim)
- 2019: Cruzeiro (assistant)
- 2020–2022: Botafogo U20
- 2021: Botafogo (interim)
- 2023: Fluminense U20
- 2024: Coimbra
- 2025: Cuiabá U20
- 2026: Confiança (assistant)
- 2026: Confiança (interim)
- 2026: Confiança (interim)
- 2026: Confiança
- 2027–: Confiança (assistant)

Ricardo Alves Resende (born 3 July 1980) is a Brazilian football coach, currently the assistant coach of Confiança.

At youth level, Resende won two Copa do Brasil titles with Atlético Mineiro, as well as finishing runner-up with Cruzeiro and Botafogo and winning a Copa Rio with Fluminense. In senior football, he was an interim head coach at Cruzeiro in the Campeonato Brasileiro Série A in 2019, and at Botafogo in Campeonato Brasileiro Série B in 2021.

== Career ==
As a youth, Resende played futsal for Atlético Mineiro and then football for América Mineiro and smaller teams. He studied coaching courses and was put in charge of Atlético Mineiro's under-13 team in 2007. He won the Copa do Brasil twice at youth level with the Galo: the under-17 edition in 2014 and the under-20 version in 2017.

Resende was under-20 coach at Cruzeiro in August 2019 when Mano Menezes resigned, and was named interim head coach. In his one game on 11 August, his team drew 2–2 away to Avaí in the Campeonato Brasileiro Série A. The result was sealed with an added-time goal by Sassá that was given by the video assistant referee; Resende had chosen the goalscorer in place of the suspended Fred. In the same year, he took the under-20 team to a cup final, which they lost on penalties to Palmeiras after a 5–5 aggregate draw. He remained an assistant to Abel Braga in the first team.

In October 2020, Resende moved to Botafogo again as under-20 coach. In his fourth national cup final, he again lost on penalties, this time to Coritiba in June 2021. The following month, he was an interim head coach for two games in the Campeonato Brasileiro Série B, losing both. He left his under-20 job in July 2022, having reached the semi-finals of the state league and being in 8th of 10 teams in the national league after four games.

Remaining in Rio de Janeiro, Resende was head coach of Fluminense under-20 in 2023. He won the Copa Rio in the age group before leaving in November 2023 due to a job offer elsewhere.

In January 2024, Resende moved to Helsingør of the Danish 1st Division as analyst, having known their head coach Álvaro Santos from childhood. He was one of 12 employees, including Santos, to leave following relegation in June.

On 1 August 2024, Resende had his first experience as a permanent head coach, being appointed in charge of Coimbra. Despite winning his four matches in charge, he left the club on 25 September, and returned to the under-20 category the following 15 May, after taking over Cuiabá. He was sacked from the side on 25 July 2025.

On 2 February 2026, Resende signed for Confiança to become the permanent assistant coach of the side, while also acting as an interim head coach for the upcoming Campeonato Sergipano match. He left the interim role after the arrival of Cláudio Caçapa, but was again named in charge of the side on 10 May, after Caçapa was sacked.

Back to an assistant role on 18 May 2026, after Thiago Gomes was appointed head coach, Resende became Confiança's head coach for the remaining five matches of the year on 15 July, after Gomes was himself dismissed. Unable to avoid relegation, he returned to his previous assistant role after the arrival of Ademir Fesan.
