= Elio Sizenando =

Brazilian football coach (born 1971)

Personal information
- Full name: Elio Sizenando Teixeira Filho
- Date of birth: 2 March 1971 (age 55)
- Place of birth: Campinas, Brazil

Team information
- Current team: Capivariano (head coach)

Managerial career
- Years: Team
- 2005–2011: Paulínia (youth)
- 2011: Paulínia U20
- 2012–2013: Novorizontino
- 2013: Mirassol U17
- 2014–2015: Ponte Preta U17
- 2016: Capivariano U20
- 2017: Capivariano
- 2017: Capivariano (assistant)
- 2017: Figueirense U20
- 2018–2019: Desportivo Brasil U20
- 2019–2022: Desportivo Brasil
- 2022–2025: Capivariano
- 2022: Capivariano U20
- 2023: Capivariano U20
- 2025: Pouso Alegre
- 2025: Figueirense
- 2026: Capivariano
- 2026: Guarani
- 2027–: Capivariano

Elio Sizenando Teixeira Filho (born 2 March 1971) is a Brazilian football coach, currently the head coach of Capivariano.

== Career ==
Born in Campinas, São Paulo, Sizenando began his career with the youth sides of Paulínia, becoming the head coach of their under-20 team in 2011. In 2012, he became the first head coach of Grêmio Novorizontino, leading the side to a promotion from the Campeonato Paulista Segunda Divisão.

Sizenando was sacked by Novorizontino on 25 February 2013, and took over the under-17 team of Mirassol on 28 May. In the following year, he moved to Ponte Preta under the same role, and worked as an under-20 coach at Capivariano in 2016.

After leading the club to a second position in the 2016 Campeonato Paulista Sub-20, Sizenando was named head coach of Capivariano's first team in December of that year. The following February, he was moved to an assistant role after six winless matches in charge.

In September 2017, Sizenando moved to Figueirense to work in their youth categories. On 30 May 2018, he was announced by Desportivo Brasil as their under-20 coach.

Sizenando became the head coach of the main squad of DB in August 2019, remaining in charge of the side until July 2021, when he left by mutual consent. On 16 December of that year, he returned to Capivariano for the Campeonato Paulista Série A3.

Sizenando led Capi to two promotions in four years, taking the club back to the Campeonato Paulista as champions on both occasions; in the club's periods of inactivity, he was also in charge of the under-20 squad.

On 26 May 2025, Sizenando was named head coach of Série D side Pouso Alegre. He left the club after their elimination from the competition, and returned to Figueirense on 13 August, now as head coach of the first team.

Sizenando left Figueira on 1 September 2025, after narrowly avoiding relegation from the Série C, and returned to Capivariano for the 2026 Campeonato Paulista. On 11 March 2026, he was named head coach of Guarani also in the third division.

On 23 August 2026, one match before the final round of the 2026 Série C first stage, Sizenando was sacked.

== Honours ==
Capivariano

- Campeonato Paulista Série A2: 2025
- Campeonato Paulista Série A3: 2023
