= Luiz Gabardo Júnior =

Brazilian football manager (born 1984)

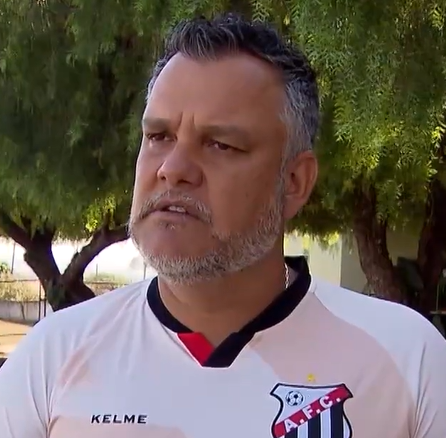
- Gabardo Júnior in 2025

Personal information
- Full name: Luiz Gabardo Júnior
- Date of birth: 14 January 1983 (age 43)
- Place of birth: Porto Alegre, Brazil

Team information
- Current team: Agro (head coach)

Youth career
- Years: Team
- Grêmio
- Santos
- –2003: São José-RS

Managerial career
- 2003: São José-RS U13
- 2004–2008: Grêmio U12
- 2009–2011: Grêmio U13
- 2011–2013: Grêmio U15
- 2013–2015: Grêmio U17
- 2015–2018: Grêmio U20
- 2019: São Caetano
- 2020: CEOV
- 2020: CEOV
- 2021: Vitória da Conquista
- 2021–2022: Boa Esporte
- 2023: Novo Hamburgo
- 2023: CEOV
- 2024: Jequié
- 2024–2025: ABECAT
- 2025: São José-RS
- 2025: Anápolis
- 2026: São José-RS
- 2026: Ypiranga-RS
- 2027–: Agro

Luiz Gabardo Júnior (born 14 January 1983) is a Brazilian football coach, currently the head coach of Agro.

== Career ==
Born in Porto Alegre, Rio Grande do Sul, Gabardo only played youth football before retiring in 2003 and immediately becoming the head coach of the under-13 team of São José-RS. He moved to Grêmio in the following year, being in charge of all sides before leaving the club in 2018.

On 2 April 2019, Gabardo had his first senior experience after being appointed head coach of São Caetano. He was sacked on 25 June, after just one win in seven matches.

In January 2020, Gabardo took over CEOV. After leaving in July, he returned to the club in October, but again left one month later.

On 18 January 2021, Gabardo was announced as head coach of Vitória da Conquista. He left on 29 March, after receiving an offer from Boa Esporte.

Gabardo renewed his contract with Boa on 22 October 2021, but was sacked the following 7 July. On 9 November, he was named in charge of Novo Hamburgo for the upcoming season.

Dismissed by Noia on 3 February 2023, Gabardo returned to CEOV on 1 April. On 7 November, he was announced as head coach of Jequié for the 2024 Campeonato Baiano.

On 2 May 2024, Gabardo was appointed ABECAT head coach. He led the club to a first-ever promotion to the Campeonato Goiano, and reached the quarterfinals of the 2025 edition of the tournament.

On 22 March 2025, Gabardo returned to his first club São José, now as head coach of the main squad. On 18 June, he left the club to take over Série C side Anápolis.

Gabardo left Anápolis on 29 September 2025, after failing to agree new terms, and returned to São José on 25 October. On 21 April 2026, he left the club to take over Ypiranga-RS back in the third division.

On 7 October 2026, Gabardo was announced as head coach of Agro for the upcoming season.
