= Ademir Fesan =

Brazilian football manager (born 1977)

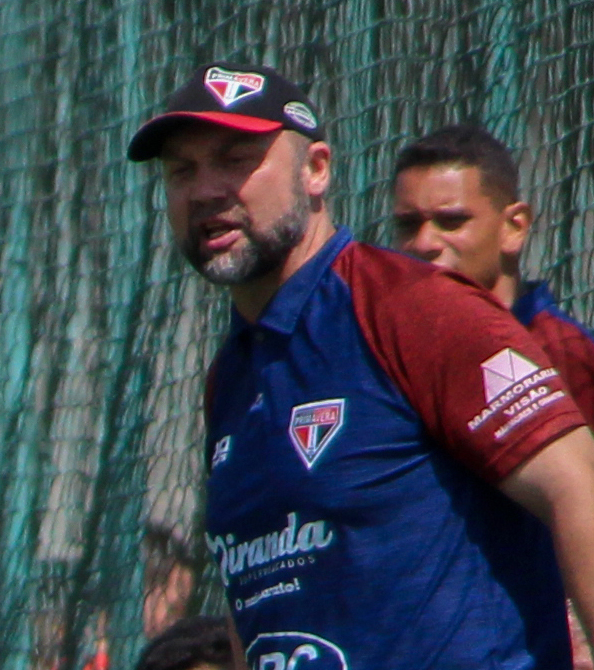
- Fesan coaching Primavera in 2021

Personal information
- Full name: Ademir Ferreira dos Santos
- Date of birth: 1 June 1977 (age 49)
- Place of birth: São Paulo, Brazil

Team information
- Current team: Confiança (head coach)

Managerial career
- Years: Team
- 2008: Portuguesa Santista (assistant)
- 2009: Grêmio Barueri U15
- 2009: Grêmio Barueri U17
- 2010: Brasil de Farroupilha U20
- 2010: Grêmio Prudente U17
- 2010–2011: Grêmio Prudente U20
- 2012: Juventus-SP U17
- 2012: Santos U13
- 2013: Santos U15
- 2013: Monte Azul
- 2015: Taboão da Serra U20
- 2015: ABC (assistant)
- 2015: ABC (interim)
- 2015: ABC (interim)
- 2015–2016: Ceará (assistant)
- 2016: Guarani (assistant)
- 2016: Joinville (assistant)
- 2016: Internacional (assistant)
- 2017: Taboão da Serra
- 2017: Atlético Tubarão U20
- 2017–2018: Paraná (assistant)
- 2018: Paraná (interim)
- 2019: CRB (assistant)
- 2019: Vitória (assistant)
- 2019: Cuiabá (assistant)
- 2020: Grêmio Prudente
- 2021–2022: Primavera
- 2023: FC Cascavel
- 2023–2024: Grêmio Prudente
- 2024: Comercial-SP
- 2024: São Bento
- 2025: Santa Catarina
- 2025: Inter de Limeira
- 2026: Água Santa
- 2026: Portuguesa
- 2027–: Confiança

Ademir Ferreira dos Santos (born 1 June 1977), known as Ademir Fesan, is a Brazilian football coach, currently the head coach of Confiança.

== Career ==
Born in São Paulo, Fesan began his career as an assistant of Portuguesa Santista in 2008. After working as a youth coach at Grêmio Barueri, Brasil de Farroupilha, Juventus-SP and Santos, he was appointed head coach of Monte Azul in July 2013.

Fesan left AMA in August 2013, and spent more than a year without a club before joining Taboão da Serra as an under-20 coach in October 2014. He then moved to ABC as an assistant coach in March 2015, but also worked as an interim on two occasions.

Fesan was fired from ABC on 17 August 2015, and moved to Ceará in September, being the assistant of Lisca. He then worked with Marcelo Chamusca at Guarani, before rejoining Lisca's staff at Joinville and Internacional.

Fesan returned to CATS on 28 June 2017, now as a first team head coach. Sacked after just four matches on 24 July, he joined Atlético Tubarão as an under-20 coach in September.

Fesan reunited with Lisca at Paraná in 2017, and continued at the club in the following year, when he was appointed interim head coach on 16 February 2018, after Wagner Lopes was sacked. He was dismissed on 18 September of that year due to "financial difficulties".

Fesan rejoined Chamusca's staff at CRB, and followed him to Vitória and Cuiabá, all in the 2019 season. On 17 January 2020, he was appointed head coach of Grêmio Prudente.

On 19 January 2021, Fesan agreed to become Primavera's head coach. He led the club back to the Campeonato Paulista Série A2, but was sacked on 14 February 2022.

On 20 September 2022, Fesan was confirmed as FC Cascavel's head coach for the upcoming season, but was dismissed the following 5 February. He returned to Prudente eight days later, and reached the semi-finals of both the year's Campeonato Paulista Série A3 and the Copa Paulista, being knocked out by São José-SP on both competitions.

Fesan was sacked by Prudente on 4 February 2024, after just three matches into the season, and took over Comercial-SP eighteen days later. He left the latter after suffering relegation, and was named at the helm of São Bento on 19 April.

On 4 September 2024, Fesan left São Bento after being knocked out in the Copa Paulista, and was appointed Santa Catarina head coach on 18 October. He led the club to the semifinals of the 2025 Campeonato Catarinense, before departing on 11 March of that year.

On 19 March 2025, Inter de Limeira announced Fesan as their head coach. He led the club to a promotion from the Série D after winning 16 matches out of 30, but left on 7 October after failing to agree new terms.

On 15 October 2025, Fesan was confirmed as Água Santa's head coach for the ensuing campaign. The following 26 March, after a 3–0 loss to Ituano which diminished the club's promotion chances, he was sacked.

On 6 April 2026, Fesan signed a contract with Portuguesa, becoming their new head coach in the place of Fábio Matias. On 28 July, after being knocked out in the round of 16 of the Série D, he was dismissed.

== Managerial statistics ==
As of 3 August 2026.

Managerial record by team and tenure
Team	Nat	From	To	Record								Ref
Team	Nat	From	To	G	W	D	L	GF	GA	GD	Win %	Ref
Grêmio Barueri (Note: Coached the club in the 2010 Copa Paulista as they fielded an under-20 squad in the entire competition)	(Brazil)	12 September 2010	19 September 2010	2	1	0	1	2	2	+0	50.00	
Monte Azul	(Brazil)	11 July 2013	20 August 2013	6	2	1	3	5	6	−1	33.33	
ABC (interim)	(Brazil)	9 March 2015	23 March 2015	3	3	0	0	10	2	+8	100.00	
ABC (interim)	(Brazil)	20 May 2015	25 May 2015	1	0	1	0	1	1	+0	0.00	
Joinville (interim) (Note: Interim head coach as Lisca was suspended)	(Brazil)	9 September 2016	9 September 2016	1	0	1	0	1	1	+0	0.00	
Taboão da Serra	(Brazil)	28 June 2017	24 July 2017	4	1	1	2	6	8	−2	25.00	
Paraná (interim)	(Brazil)	16 February 2018	24 February 2018	1	0	0	1	0	1	−1	0.00	
Paraná (interim) (Note: Interim head coach as Rogério Micale was suspended)	(Brazil)	18 July 2018	18 July 2018	1	0	0	1	0	1	−1	0.00	
Grêmio Prudente	(Brazil)	17 January 2020	14 December 2020	14	9	3	2	29	12	+17	64.29	
Primavera	(Brazil)	19 January 2021	14 February 2022	33	10	13	10	36	37	−1	30.30	
FC Cascavel	(Brazil)	20 September 2022	5 February 2023	6	3	2	1	9	8	+1	50.00	
Grêmio Prudente	(Brazil)	13 February 2023	4 February 2024	33	13	10	10	41	35	+6	39.39	
Comercial-SP	(Brazil)	22 February 2024	15 April 2024	5	0	1	4	4	10	−6	0.00	
São Bento	(Brazil)	19 April 2024	4 September 2024	10	2	7	1	5	4	+1	20.00	
Santa Catarina	(Brazil)	18 October 2024	11 March 2025	13	6	5	2	22	14	+8	46.15	
Inter de Limeira	(Brazil)	19 March 2025	7 October 2025	31	16	9	6	41	22	+19	51.61	
Água Santa	(Brazil)	15 October 2025	26 March 2026	17	10	3	4	22	14	+8	58.82	
Portuguesa	(Brazil)	6 April 2026	28 July 2026	15	9	4	2	21	9	+12	60.00	
Total				196	85	61	50	255	187	+68	43.37	—
