= Miguel Bianconi =

Brazilian footballer

Personal information
- Full name: Miguel Antônio Bianconi Kohl
- Date of birth: 14 May 1992 (age 34)
- Place of birth: Mococa, Brazil
- Height: 1.91 m (6 ft 3 in)
- Position: Striker

Team information
- Current team: Inter de Limeira
- Number: 9

Youth career
- 2007–2011: Palmeiras

Senior career*
Years	Team	Apps	(Gls)
2011–2014	Palmeiras B	22	(13)
2011–2012	→ Comercial (loan)	14	(5)
2013–2014	→ Chungju Hummel (loan)	8	(0)
2014–2017	Palmeiras	7	(1)
2014	→ Ponte Preta (loan)	2	(0)
2015	→ Bonsucesso (loan)	8	(0)
2016	→ Kamatamare Sanuki (loan)	20	(1)
2017	Mogi Mirim	17	(6)
2017	Poli Timișoara	9	(4)
2018	Bragantino	5	(3)
2018–2020	Platanias	39	(21)
2020	Lamia	15	(4)
2021	Levadiakos	19	(6)
2021–2022	Anagennisi Karditsa	23	(8)
2022	Wilstermann	25	(3)
2023	Makedonikos	13	(1)
2024	Chiangrai United	10	(4)
2024–2025	Orihuela	14	(0)
2025	São Joseense	5	(3)
2025–	Inter de Limeira	53	(19)
- * Club domestic league appearances and goals as of 11 October 2026

Miguel Antônio Bianconi Kohl (born 14 May 1992), or simply Miguel Bianconi, is a Brazilian professional footballer who plays as a striker for Inter de Limeira.

== Career ==
=== Platanias ===
On 22 August 2018, Bianconi joined Football League club Platanias, signing a three-year contract on a free transfer.

He finished his debut season with 16 goals in 29 assists, but his team missed out promotion against OFI.

=== Lamia ===
On 10 January 2020, following his release from Platanias, Super League club Lamia officially announced the acquisition of the Brazilian striker on a free transfer. Five days later, he scored his first goal for the club in a 1–1 home draw against Trikala, as his team qualified for the quarter-finals of the Greek Cup.

On 27 January 2020, he scored his first league goal in a 1–1 home draw against Asteras Tripolis.

On 8 June 2020, he scored in a 2–0 home win against Panetolikos for the 2019–20 Super League play-offs after an 80-day enforced COVID-19 break.

His first goal for the 2020–21 season came in a 2–1 home defeat against Volos.

=== Levadiakos ===
On 2 February 2021, he signed a contract with Levadiakos, on a free transfer.

== Career statistics ==
=== Club ===
As of 19 May 2022

Club	Season	League			Cup		Continental		Other		Total	
Club	Season	Division	Apps	Goals	Apps	Goals	Apps	Goals	Apps	Goals	Apps	Goals
Platanias	2018–19	Football League	29	16	1	0	—		—		30	16
Platanias	2019–20	Super League Greece 2	10	5	2	1	—		—		10	6
Platanias	Total		39	21	3	1	—		—		42	22
Lamia	2019–20	Super League Greece	9	3	2	1	—		—		11	4
Lamia	2020–21	Super League Greece	6	1	—		—		—		6	1
Lamia	Total		15	4	2	1	—		—		17	5
Levadiakos	2020–21	Super League Greece 2	19	6	0	0	—		—		19	6
Anagennisi Katditsa	2021–22	Super League Greece 2	23	8	5	0	—		—		28	8
Career total			96	39	10	2	0	0	0	0	106	41

== Honours ==
=== Individual ===
- 2018–19 Football League Greece top scorer
- 2026 Campeonato Brasileiro Série C top scorer
