= Neto Colucci =

Brazilian futsal player football manager

Personal information
- Full name: Carmine Colucci Neto
- Date of birth: 29 May 1975 (age 51)
- Place of birth: Vassouras, Brazil

Team information
- Current team: Volta Redonda U20 (head coach)

Senior career*
Years	Team	Apps	(Gls)
- Piraí
- Mendes
–2002	Vassouras		
2017	Mendes		

Managerial career
- 2003: Fluminense (futsal)
- 2007–2008: Vasco da Gama (futsal)
- 2008–2011: Vassouras (futsal)
- 2012–2013: Piraí (futsal)
- 2014: Mendes (futsal – assistant)
- 2015: Mendes (futsal)
- 2015–2018: Volta Redonda U20
- 2018–2020: Paulo de Frontin (futsal)
- 2018: Pérolas Negras
- 2018–2020: Volta Redonda U20
- 2020: Volta Redonda (assistant)
- 2020: Botafogo U17
- 2020–2022: Volta Redonda
- 2022: Pérolas Negras
- 2025: Paulo de Frontin (futsal)
- 2025: Volta Redonda U17
- 2025–: Volta Redonda U20
- 2025: Volta Redonda (interim)
- 2026: Volta Redonda (interim)
- 2026: Volta Redonda (interim)
- * Club domestic league appearances and goals

Carmine Colucci Neto (born 29 May 1975), known as Neto Colucci, is a Brazilian football and futsal coach, and former futsal player. He is the current head coach of Volta Redonda's under-20 team.

== Career ==
Born in Vassouras, Rio de Janeiro, Colucci played futsal professionally for Piraí, Mendes and Vassouras before joining Fluminense's futsal side for the 2003 season; as the regulation at the time only allowed him to play in the Copa Rio Sul de Futsal as a manager, he switched to his new role.

Colucci subsequently worked as manager of futsal sides Vasco da Gama, Vassouras (where he won four consecutive Copa Rio Sul de Futsal titles), Piraí and Mendes. In May 2015, he switched to football and was appointed manager of Volta Redonda's under-20 squad.

Colucci returned to play for Mendes in the 2017 season, while still working for Volta Redonda. In January 2018, he was named manager of futsal side Paulo de Frontin, also sharing roles with his Voltaço job.

In May 2018, Colucci was appointed at the helm of Pérolas Negras in the Campeonato Carioca Série B2. He subsequently returned to Volta Redonda and their under-20 squad, and also submitted a candidacy to the club's presidency late in the year; he later withdrew his candidacy.

Colucci was promoted to the assistant manager role at Voltaço's first team squad in January 2020. He left the club in September to take over Botafogo's under-17 squad, but returned to his previous club on 27 October as manager of the main squad in the Série C.

On 28 February 2022, Colucci was sacked by Voltaço. He returned to Pérolas Negras on 1 August, and led the club to the second place in the Campeonato Carioca Série B1 before leaving.

In December 2023, Colucci agreed to return to the futsal side of Vassouras, but the deal collapsed in February. In January 2025, he returned to Paulo de Frontin, before subsequently returning to Volta Redonda; initially in charge of the under-17 team, he later coached the under-20s before becoming an interim head coach of the main squad on 12 November.

== Personal life ==
In July 2024, Colucci was arrested after threatening to kill three people in Vassouras. Released in August due to a habeas corpus, the decision was revoked in September.

== Honours ==
=== Manager ===
Vassouras

- Copa Rio Sul de Futsal: 2008, 2009, 2010, 2011

Piraí

- Copa Rio Sul de Futsal: 2013

Paulo de Frontin

- Copa Rio Sul de Futsal: 2018
