= William de Mattia =

Brazilian footballer (born 1983)

Personal information
- Full name: William de Mattia
- Date of birth: 28 April 1983 (age 43)
- Place of birth: Criciúma, Brazil
- Height: 1.79 m (5 ft 10 1/2 in)
- Position: Midfielder

Senior career*
Years	Team	Apps	(Gls)
2002	Tubarão		
2003	Gama		
2003	Tubarão		
2003–2005	Figueirense		
2005	Juventus Jaraguá		
2005–2007	Skoda Xanthi	12	(1)
2006–2007	→ Kastoria (loan)		
2008	Santa Cruz	1	(0)
2009	Marcílio Dias		
2009–2011	FC PoPa	24	(6)
2010	→ Uberlândia (loan)	7	(1)
2010	→ Tampere United (loan)	15	(2)
2010	→ HJK Helsinki (loan)	5	(0)
2011	→ Haka (loan)	6	(1)
2012–2013	Haka	15	(4)
2014	MyPa	28	(1)
2015	Juventude	8	(0)
2016	Guarani de Palhoça	15	(0)
2016	Hercílio Luz	6	(0)
2017	São Paulo-RS	10	(0)

Managerial career
- 2019–2021: Nova Mutum
- 2022: Grêmio Anápolis
- 2022: Juventus Jaraguá
- 2023–2024: Treze
- 2025: Brasil de Pelotas
- 2025: Treze
- 2026: Sergipe
- 2026: Volta Redonda
- 2026: Caxias
- * Club domestic league appearances and goals

William de Mattia (born 28 April 1983), sometimes known as Dema, is a Brazilian football coach and former player who played as a midfielder.

== Honours ==
=== Coach ===
Nova Mutum

- Campeonato Mato-Grossense Second Division: 2019
- Campeonato Mato-Grossense: 2020

Treze

- Campeonato Paraibano: 2023

Sergipe

- Campeonato Sergipano: 2026
