= Bernardo Franco =

Brazilian football coach (born 1986)

Personal information
- Full name: Bernardo Franco Júnior
- Date of birth: 26 April 1986 (age 40)
- Place of birth: Curitiba, Brazil

Managerial career
- Years: Team
- 2018: Atlético Paranaense U15
- 2019: Athletico Paranaense U17
- 2020–2022: Athletico Paranaense (assistant)
- 2022: Atlético Mineiro U20
- 2022: Cuiabá (assistant)
- 2022: Cuiabá (interim)
- 2023: Coritiba (assistant)
- 2023–2024: Cuiabá (assistant)
- 2024: Corinthians (assistant)
- 2024–2025: Cuiabá
- 2025: Brusque
- 2026: Botafogo-PB
- 2026: Barra-SC
- 2026: Fortaleza (assistant)

Bernardo Franco Júnior (born 26 April 1986) is a Brazilian football coach.

== Career ==
Born in Curitiba, Paraná, Franco began his career with Atlético Paranaense's under-15 team in 2018. In the following year, he took over the under-17s and won the 2019 Campeonato Paranaense Sub-17.

Franco was promoted to Athletico's first team in 2020, as an assistant coach. On 4 March 2022, he was announced as head coach of Atlético Mineiro's under-20 team, but left in June to join António Oliveira's staff at Cuiabá, as his assistant; he was also an interim head coach in a 1–0 Série A home win over Corinthians on 7 June, as Oliveira was not registered in time.

In the following years, Franco followed Oliveira to Coritiba, back to Cuiabá and Corinthians, always as his assistant. On 28 August 2024, he returned to the Dourado after being named head coach of the side.

Despite suffering relegation from the top tier, Franco was kept in charge for the 2025 season, but was dismissed on 20 February of that year, after being knocked out of the 2025 Copa do Brasil. On 10 July, he was named head coach of Brusque in the Série C.

On 20 October 2025, after missing out promotion in the second stage, Franco took over fellow third division side Botafogo-PB. The following 1 February, after a 4–1 loss to Campinense, he was sacked, and took over Barra-SC also in level three on 20 March 2026.

Franco was sacked from Barra on 28 June 2026, after eight winless matches.

== Managerial statistics ==
As of 20 March 2026.

Managerial record by team and tenure
Team	Nat	From	To	Record								Ref
Team	Nat	From	To	G	W	D	L	GF	GA	GD	Win %	Ref
Cuiabá (interim)	(Brazil)	7 June 2022	7 June 2022	1	1	0	0	1	0	+1	100.00	
Cuiabá	(Brazil)	28 August 2024	20 February 2025	21	5	9	7	19	17	+2	23.81	
Brusque	(Brazil)	10 July 2025	20 October 2025	16	7	2	7	19	15	+4	43.75	
Botafogo-PB	(Brazil)	20 October 2025	1 February 2026	5	2	2	1	8	6	+2	40.00	
Barra-SC	(Brazil)	20 March 2026	28 June 2026	14	2	6	6	14	15	−1	14.29	
Total				57	17	19	21	61	53	+8	29.82	—

== Honours ==
Athletico Paranaense U17

- Campeonato Paranaense Sub-17: 2019
