= Ferreira (footballer, born 1996) =

Brazilian footballer

Personal information
- Full name: João Gabriel Ferreira Gomes
- Date of birth: 20 March 1996 (age 30)
- Place of birth: Matão, Brazil
- Height: 1.74 m (5 ft 9 in)
- Position: Midfielder

Team information
- Current team: ASA

Youth career
- Mirassol
- 2014: Ferroviária
- 2015–2016: Santos

Senior career*
Years	Team	Apps	(Gls)
2016–2017	Aves B	14	(1)
2018–2019	Ginásio Figueirense Castelo Rodrigo	15	(3)
2019–2021	União Almeirim	25	(12)
2022	Matonense	10	(0)
2022	→ Flamengo de Guanambi (loan)	8	(0)
2023	Andraus	11	(1)
2024	Sertãozinho	15	(0)
2024–2025	Rio Branco-PR	23	(0)
2024	→ Portuguesa (loan)	0	(0)
2024	→ Arapongas (loan)	4	(1)
2025	Azuriz	4	(0)
2026–	ASA	12	(0)
- * Club domestic league appearances and goals as of 19 November 2026

João Gabriel Ferreira Gomes (born 20 March 1996), known as Ferreira or sometimes as João Gabriel, is a Brazilian footballer who plays as a midfielder for ASA.

== Career ==
Born in Matão, São Paulo, Ferreira represented Mirassol, Ferroviária and Santos as a youth before joining Portuguese side Aves in 2016. After spending the season playing for the B-team, he was released and spent a year without a club before signing for Ginásio Figueirense de Figueira de Castelo Rodrigo.

Ferreira signed for União Almeirim in 2019, helping in their promotion to the Campeonato de Portugal in his first campaign. He returned to his home country in 2022, with Matonense, before being loaned out to Flamengo de Guanambi in April.

Back to Matonense in October 2022, Ferreira agreed to a deal with Andraus for the 2023 season, winning the Campeonato Paranaense Série Prata and scoring the winning goal in the final against PSTC. In November 2023, he joined Sertãozinho for the upcoming campaign.

Ferreira subsequently joined Rio Branco-PR on 29 April 2024, and helped the side to achieve promotion from the Paranaense Série Prata. On 6 August, he was announced at Portuguesa.

== Career statistics ==
As of 5 December 2024

Club	Season	League			State League		Cup		Continental		Other		Total	
Club	Season	Division	Apps	Goals	Apps	Goals	Apps	Goals	Apps	Goals	Apps	Goals	Apps	Goals
Aves B	2016–17	Porto FA Elite Division	14	1	—		—		—		—		14	1
Ginásio Figueirense (C. Rodrigo)	2018–19	Guarda FA First Division	15	3	—		—		—		1 (Note: Appearance(s) in Guarda FA Taça)	0	16	3
União Almeirim	2019–20	Santarém FA First Division	20	12	—		1	0	—		3 (Note: Appearance(s) in AF Santarém Taça Ribatejo)	2	24	14
União Almeirim	2020–21	Campeonato de Portugal	5	0	—		1	0	—		—		6	0
União Almeirim	Total		25	12	—		2	0	—		3	2	30	14
Matonense	2022	Paulista A3	—		10	0	—		—		—		10	0
Flamengo de Guanambi (loan)	2022	Baiano 2ª Divisão	—		8	0	—		—		—		8	0
Andraus	2023	Paranaense Série Prata	—		11	1	—		—		—		11	1
Sertãozinho	2024	Paulista A3	—		15	0	—		—		—		15	0
Rio Branco-PR	2024	Paranaense Série Prata	—		12	0	—		—		—		12	0
Portuguesa (loan)	2024	Paulista	—		—		—		—		8 (Note: Appearance(s) in Copa Paulista)	0	8	0
Arapongas (loan)	2024	Paranaense Série Bronze	—		4	1	—		—		—		4	1
Career total			54	16	56	1	2	0	0	0	12	2	124	19

== Honours ==
Ginásio Figueirense (C. Rodrigo)

- Guarda FA First Division: 2018–19

Andraus

- Campeonato Paranaense Série Prata: 2023
