= Santa Catarina Clube =

Brazilian association football club

- Full name: Santa Catarina Clube
- Nickname: Águia (Eagle)
- Founded: 11 December 1998; 27 years ago
- Ground: Alfredão
- Capacity: 2,959
- President: Anilto Hegen
- Head coach: Betinho
- League: Campeonato Brasileiro Série D Campeonato Catarinense
- 2025: Catarinense, 3rd of 12
- Website: https://www.santacatarinaclube.com.br/
| Home colours | Away colours |

Santa Catarina Clube, generally known as Santa Catarina, is a Brazilian football club from Rio do Sul, Santa Catarina. It competes in the Campeonato Catarinense, the top tier of the Santa Catarina state football league.

== History ==
Founded in 1998, the club played the 1999 and 2000 editions of the Campeonato Catarinense Série B in Blumenau, and moved to Navegantes in 2002, after not competing in the previous year. After five years of inactivity, the club returned to the 2008 Campeonato Catarinense Série C, initially to play in São Francisco do Sul; however, after difficulties to find an available stadium, the club ended up playing in Joinville.

After another campaign in the third division in 2009, Santa Catarina went into inactivity until 2015, playing the third tier in Imbituba. In the following year, the club played the first round of the Catarinense Série C, but was excluded from the competition after two W.O.s.

Another five years of inactivity followed, and Santa Catarina returned to the third division in 2022 in Rio do Sul, winning their first-ever title and achieving promotion to the second division. After narrowly missing out promotion in the 2023 Catarinense Série B, the club achieved a first-ever promotion to the Campeonato Catarinense in the following campaign, but lost the title to Caravaggio.

Santa Catarina impressed during the 2025 Catarinense, reaching the semifinals of the competition and qualifying to the 2026 Campeonato Brasileiro Série D.

== Honours ==
=== Official tournaments ===
State
| Competitions | Titles | Seasons |
|---|---|---|
| Campeonato Catarinense Série C | 1 | 2022 |

=== Runners-up ===
- Campeonato Catarinense Série B (1): 2024
