= 2025 Campeonato Goiano =

Campeonato Goiano
- Season: 2025
- Dates: 15 January – April
- Champions: Vila Nova
- Relegated: Goiânia; Goianésia
- Copa do Brasil: Anápolis; Vila Nova; Atlético Goianiense
- Série D: CRAC; Inhumas; ABECAT
- Copa Verde: Anápolis; Vila Nova

The 2025 Campeonato Goiano (officially the GOIANÃO 1XBET 2025 for sponsorship reasons) is the 82nd edition of Goiás's top professional football league organized by FGF. The competition began on 15 January and scheduled to conclude in April 2025.

== Participating teams ==
Club	Home city	Manager
ABECAT	Ouvidor	
Anápolis	Anápolis	Alan George
Aparecidense	Aparecida de Goiânia	Lúcio Flávio
Atlético Goianiense	Goiânia	Vagner Mancini
CRAC	Catalão	Leandro Sena
Goianésia	Goianésia	Jorge Saran
Goiatuba	Goiatuba	
Goiás	Goiânia	Jair Ventura
Goiânia	Goiânia	Glauber Ramos
Inhumas	Inhumas	
Jataiense	Jataí	
Vila Nova	Goiânia	Rafael Lacerda

== Format ==
In the first stage, each team will play the other eleven teams in a single round-robin tournament. The teams will be ranked according to points. If tied on points, the following criteria will be used to determine the ranking: 1. Wins; 2. Goal difference; 3. Goals scored; 4. Head-to-head points (only between two teams) 5. Fewest red cards; 6. Fewest yellow cards; 7. Draw. These criteria (except 4) will also be used to determine the overall performance in the final stages. The top eight teams will advance to the quarter-finals while the bottom two teams will be relegated to 2026 Campeonato Goiano da Divisão de Acesso.

The final stages will be played on a home-and-away two-legged basis. For the semi-finals and finals the best overall performance team will host the second leg. If the score is level, a penalty shoot-out will be used to determine the winners.

== First stage ==
Pos	Team	Pld	W	D	L	GF	GA	GD	Pts	Qualification or relegation
1	Anápolis	11	7	2	2	15	7	+8	23	Advance to Quarter-finals
2	Vila Nova	11	6	4	1	10	5	+5	22	Advance to Quarter-finals
3	Atlético Goianiense	11	5	4	2	14	8	+6	19	Advance to Quarter-finals
4	Goiás	11	5	3	3	11	7	+4	18	Advance to Quarter-finals
5	CRAC	11	4	5	2	10	7	+3	17	Advance to Quarter-finals
6	Inhumas	11	4	2	5	9	14	−5	14	Advance to Quarter-finals
7	Jataiense	11	4	1	6	13	13	0	13	Advance to Quarter-finals
8	ABECAT	11	4	1	6	9	12	−3	13	Advance to Quarter-finals
9	Goiatuba	11	3	4	4	7	10	−3	13	
10	Aparecidense	11	3	3	5	8	8	0	12	
11	Goianésia	11	2	4	5	11	14	−3	10	Relegation to the Divisão de Acesso
12	Goiânia	11	2	1	8	8	20	−12	7	Relegation to the Divisão de Acesso

Source: FGF

== Final stage ==
=== Bracket ===
Quarter-finals
Inhumas	1	0	1
Atlético Goianiense	1	2	3
ABECAT	1	2	3 (6)
Anápolis	1	2	3 (7)
CRAC	0	1	1 (2)
Goiás	0	1	1 (4)
Jataiense	0	0	0
Vila Nova	1	0	1

Semi-finals
Atlético Goianiense	2	2	4
Anápolis	2	3	5
Goiás	0	0	0
Vila Nova	1	0	1

Finals
Anápolis	2	0	2
Vila Nova	0	3	3

=== Quarter-finals ===
Team 1	Agg.	Team 2	1st leg	2nd leg
Inhumas	1–3	Atlético Goianiense	1–1	0–2
ABECAT	3–3 (6–7 p)	Anápolis	1–1	2–2
CRAC	1–1 (2–4 p)	Goiás	0–0	1–1
Jataiense	0–1	Vila Nova	0–1	0–0

1 March 2025
18:30

Inhumas	1–1	Atlético Goianiense
Felipe Chaves 71'	Report	Marcelino 84'

Estádio Zico Brandão, Inhumas
Attendance: 803
Referee: Victor Lucas Pereira Silva
4 March 2025
17:00

Atlético Goianiense	2–0	Inhumas
Caio Dantas 9'; Martínez 90+7'	Report

Estádio Antonio Accioly, Goiânia
Referee: Gabriel Dos Santos Queiroz

1 March 2025
16:00

ABECAT	1–1	Anápolis
Lucas Silva 25'	Report	Igor Cássio 15'

Estádio Municipal Luiz Benedito, Ouvidor
Referee: Breno Vieira Souza
5 March 2025
20:30

Anápolis	2–2	ABECAT
Straub 86' (o.g.); Rafael Mineiro 90+1' (pen.)	Report	Rafinha 45+10'; Michel Potiguar 77'
Penalties
	7–6

Estádio Jonas Duarte, Anápolis

2 March 2025
16:00

CRAC	0–0	Goiás
	Report

Estádio Genervino da Fonseca, Catalão
Referee: Jefferson Ferreira Moraes
5 March 2025
19:30

Goiás	1–1	CRAC
Luiz Felipe 52'	Report	Wagner Manaus 76'
Penalties
	4–2

Estádio de Hailé Pinheiro, Goiânia

3 March 2025
16:00

Jataiense	0–1	Vila Nova
	Report	Arthur Pierino 51' (o.g.)

Estádio Nelson Antônio da Silva, Jataí
Referee: Jean Carlos da Silva Narciso
6 March 2025
19:30

Vila Nova	0–0	Jataiense
	Report

Estádio Onésio Brasileiro Alvarenga, Goiânia

=== Semi-finals ===
Team 1	Agg.	Team 2	1st leg	2nd leg
Atlético Goianiense	4–5	Anápolis	2–2	2–3
Goiás	0–1	Vila Nova	0-1	0–0

=== Finals ===
Team 1	Agg.	Team 2	1st leg	2nd leg
Anápolis	2–3	Vila Nova	2–0	0–3
