= Agro Esporte Clube =

Football club in the Ouvidor, state of Goiás, Brazil

Agro EC
- Full name: Agro Esporte Clube
- Founded: 22 June 2016; 10 years ago
- Ground: Estádio Luiz Benedito, Ouvidor, Goiás state, Brazil
- Capacity: 1,000
- President: Diego Hilario Ribeiro
- Head coach: Gabardo Júnior
- League: Campeonato Brasileiro Série D Campeonato Goiano
- 2025: Goiano, 6th of 12
- Website: agroesporteclube.com.br
Home colours	Away colours	Third colours

Agro Esporte Clube, formerly Associação Beneficente e Esportiva Catalana e Ouvidorense (ABECAT), is a football club in the city of Ouvidor, in the state of Goiás. The club is affiliated to Federação Goiana de Futebol.

== History ==
Logo used until 2025

Logo used between 2025 and 2026

Founded in 2007, in the city of Catalão, with the social character of moral and educational training of children and adolescents through the learning of sport, Abecet moved to the city of Ouvidor, where on 22 June 2016, it created the department of football. The club joined the Federação Goiana de Futebol in that year, and featured in the 2017 Campeonato Goiano Third Division. With good performances from the team, which had veteran Nonato as a striker, Abecat ended the competition by becoming the runner-up of the first professional competition they had ever competed in.

Despite achieving promotion to the Campeonato Goiano Second Division, Abecat ended up withdrawing from the competition and giving up the spot to Jataiense. Back to an active status in 2023, the club achieved two consecutive promotions to reach the Campeonato Goiano for the first time ever.

In February 2025, Abecat qualified to the quarter-finals of the 2025 Campeonato Goiano, also earning a spot in the 2026 Série D. In August of that year, the club became a SAF and changed their crest.

On 20 August 2026, Abecat merged with a project of amateur football, and was named Agro Esporte Clube, changing the identity to honour the agribusiness, a strong economic activity in the region.

== Titles ==
- Campeonato Goiano Third Division
  - Winners: 2023
