= Thiago Gomes (football manager) =

Brazilian football manager

Personal information
- Full name: Thiago Gomes Pacheco
- Date of birth: 12 May 1984 (age 42)
- Place of birth: Porto Alegre, Brazil
- Height: 1.95 m (6 ft 5 in)

Team information
- Current team: Caxias (head coach)

Managerial career
- Years: Team
- 2004–2010: Internacional B (assistant)
- 2011–2012: Atlético Paranaense (assistant)
- 2012: São José-RS U17
- 2013: São José-RS U20
- 2013–2015: Corinthians U20 (assistant)
- 2015: Bragantino (assistant)
- 2015: São José-RS
- 2015–2016: Sport Recife (assistant)
- 2016: Sport Recife (interim)
- 2016–2017: Fluminense U20
- 2017–2018: Pelotas
- 2018–2021: Grêmio U21
- 2021: Grêmio (interim)
- 2021: Grêmio (interim)
- 2021: Grêmio (interim)
- 2022: Brasil de Pelotas
- 2023: São José-RS
- 2024: Sampaio Corrêa
- 2024: Caxias
- 2025: Linense
- 2025: Samgurali
- 2026: Nacional-AM
- 2026: Confiança
- 2026: Nacional-AM
- 2027–: Caxias

Thiago Gomes Pacheco (born 12 May 1984) is a Brazilian football coach, currently the head coach of Caxias.

== Career ==
Born in Porto Alegre, Rio Grande do Sul, Gomes started his career with Internacional, being a coach of their youth categories and an assistant of the B-team for six years. In 2011, he moved to Atlético Paranaense and worked as a scout and assistant manager.

In 2013, after a period in charge of São José-RS' under-20 squad, Gomes was named Osmar Loss' assistant at the under-20 team of Corinthians. He followed Loss to Bragantino in April 2015, but left the club after being sacked in July.

Gomes subsequently returned to São José just days after leaving Bragantino, being now appointed first team head coach. However, he did not stay at the club after accepting an invitation from Paulo Roberto Falcão to work as his assistant at Sport Recife.

In April 2016, Gomes was named interim head coach of Sport after Falcão was sacked. After the appointment of Oswaldo de Oliveira, he returned to his assistant role before leaving the club after the end of the year's Campeonato Pernambucano.

On 7 November 2016, Gomes was appointed head coach of Fluminense's under-20 squad. He left in the following July to take over Pelotas.

In February 2018, Gomes left Pelotas to join Grêmio as head coach of the under-23 team. On 15 April 2021, after the dismissal of Renato Gaúcho, he was named interim head coach of the main squad.

Gomes returned to his previous role after the appointment of Tiago Nunes, but was again named interim on 5 July 2021 after Nunes was sacked. He was fired from the club in December.

On 7 June 2022, Gomes was appointed head coach of Série C side Brasil de Pelotas. On 10 September, he returned to São José for the upcoming season.

On 1 December 2023, three days after renewing his contract with São José, Gomes resigned from the club, and took over fellow third division side Sampaio Corrêa ten days later. He was dismissed from the latter on 14 May 2024, after a poor start of the league, and took over Caxias in the same category on 29 June.

On 9 May 2025, Gomes was appointed as head coach of Georgian Erovnuli Liga club Samgurali. He left the club by mutual consent the following 18 January, and was announced in charge of Nacional-AM on 22 February 2026.

Gomes won the 2026 Campeonato Amazonense with Naça, but left the club on 18 May of that year to take over Confiança. On 15 July, with the side threatened with relegation, he left by mutual consent, and returned to Nacional four days later.

On 16 October 2026, after leading Nacional to a promotion to the third division, Gomes returned to Caxias.

== Honours ==
Nacional-AM

- Campeonato Amazonense: 2026
