= Inhumas Esporte Clube =

Football club in Goiás, Brazil

Inhumas
- Full name: Inhumas Esporte Clube
- Founded: 1 June 1944; 82 years ago
- Ground: Estádio Zico Brandão, Inhumas, Goiás state, Brazil
- President: Diogo Luiz de Freitas Montes
- League: Campeonato Brasileiro Série D Campeonato Goiano
- 2025: Goiano, 7th of 12
| Home colours | Away colours | Third colours |

Inhumas Esporte Clube is a football club in Inhumas, Goiás that competes in the second division of Campeonato Goiano. They are often called the Avinhada Panthers. They play in the Zico Brandão Stadium.

== History ==
The club was founded on June 1, 1944 in Inhumas, Goiás, Brazil. The team won the Second Division in 2022 and were subsequently promoted to First Division for the first time in 28 years. The next season, they were relegated. In 2024, they won the Championship again, promoting them again. In 2026, they were relegated.

== Honours ==
- Campeonato Goiano
  - Runners-up (1): 1966
- Campeonato Goiano Second Division
  - Winners (2): 2022, 2024
- Campeonato Goiano do Interior
  - Winners (1): 1960
