= Alberto Félix (footballer) =

Brazilian football coach (born 1966)

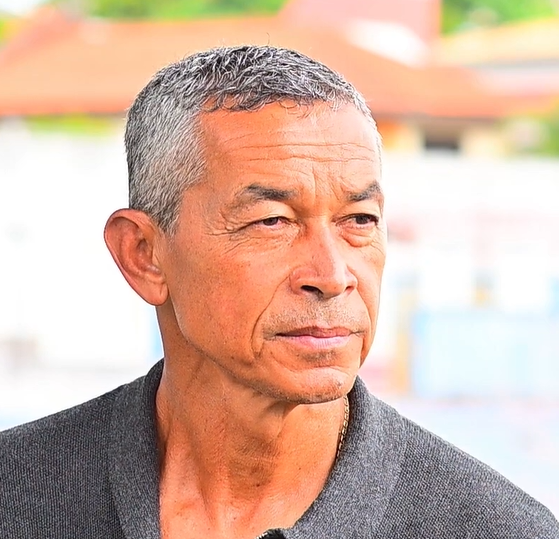
- Félix in 2024

Personal information
- Full name: Alberto Carlos Félix da Silva
- Date of birth: 31 October 1966 (age 59)
- Place of birth: Santa Rita, Brazil
- Height: 1.81 m (5 ft 11 in)
- Position: Midfielder

Youth career
- Fluminense

Senior career*
Years	Team	Apps	(Gls)
1986–1988	Fluminense	33	(4)
1988	Taubaté	31	(6)
1989	América-SP		
1989	Vitória	18	(2)
1990	Ituano	24	(12)
1990–1991	Internacional	17	(2)
1991–1995	Bragantino	117	(20)
1993	→ Ponte Preta (loan)		
1993	→ Remo (loan)		
1995	Cruzeiro	21	(2)
1996	Guarani	9	(1)
1996	Coritiba	10	(1)
1997	Portuguesa Santista	9	(1)
1997–1998	América Mineiro	13	(0)
1999	Bragantino		
2000	União São João	16	(2)
2000	Avaí		
2001	Ceará	3	(0)
2001	União Barbarense	10	(3)
2001	Bragantino	11	(4)
2002	União Barbarense	11	(0)
2003	Bragantino	9	(4)
2003–2004	Londrina		

International career
1993	Brazil	1	(0)

Managerial career
- 2011: Penapolense
- 2012–2013: Atibaia
- 2014: Taubaté
- 2015: Bragantino U20
- 2015: Bragantino (interim)
- 2016–2017: Bragantino
- 2017–2018: Taubaté
- 2018: Noroeste
- 2019: Votuporanguense
- 2020: Penapolense
- 2021: Rio Claro
- 2021: Atibaia
- 2022: Rio Claro
- 2023: Velo Clube
- 2024: Linense
- 2025: Taubaté
- 2025: Linense
- 2026: Inter de Limeira
- * Club domestic league appearances and goals

Alberto Carlos Félix da Silva (born 31 October 1966) is a Brazilian football coach and former player who played as a midfielder.

== Playing career ==
Born in Santa Rita, Paraíba, he was known as Alberto during his playing days. After making his senior debut with Fluminense in 1986, he moved to Taubaté in 1988, before joining América-SP shortly after.

Alberto subsequently played for Vitória, Ituano (where he was the top scorer of the 1990 Campeonato Paulista) and Internacional before signing for Bragantino in 1991. At the latter side, he gained proeminence and managed to feature in one friendly match for the Brazil national team against Mexico in December 1993; in that year, he also played for Ponte Preta and Remo on loan.

Alberto moved to Cruzeiro in 1995, but was unable to establish himself as a regular starter. He would later play for Guarani, Coritiba, Portuguesa Santista and América Mineiro before returning to Bragantino in 1999.

On 13 February 2001, after short spells at União São João, Avaí and Ceará, Alberto signed for União Barbarense. He later returned to Bragantino for a third spell in August, before returning to Barbarense in 2002.

Back to Bragantino ahead of the 2003 season, Alberto later played for Londrina and retired with the club in 2004, aged 37.

== Coaching career ==
After retiring, Félix began his coaching career at the helm of Penapolense in 2011. He later worked at Atibaia and Taubaté before returning to Bragantino in April 2015, as an under-20 coach.

Félix later became an interim head coach at Braga and took over the team in the 2016 Copa Paulista, before being definitely appointed head coach of the side on 29 November of that year. On 4 July 2017, after four winless matches, he resigned, and agreed to return to Taubaté on 21 September.

Sacked on 5 February 2018, Félix took over Noroeste seven days later, but still left in April after their elimination in the Campeonato Paulista Série A3. He agreed to become the head coach of São Bernardo on 12 November, but was dismissed on 21 December, after a partnership with Elenko Sports was established.

Félix was named at the helm of Votuporanguense on 11 February 2019, but was sacked on 2 April, after nine matches. He returned to Penapolense the following 30 January, but only lasted eight matches, and took over Rio Claro on 12 January 2021. Back to Atibaia on 18 June, he later returned to Rio Claro for the 2022 season, before being announced at Velo Clube on 4 October of that year.

On 22 August 2023, Linense announced Félix's signing for the upcoming campaign. Back to Taubaté for a third spell as a coach (fourth overall) on 4 November 2024, he left the club in April of the following year, returning to Linense in May 2025 but being dismissed in August.

On 10 November 2025, Félix was announced as head coach of Inter de Limeira for the ensuing season. He was sacked the following 24 January, after one win in five matches.

== Honours ==
=== Player ===
Remo

- Campeonato Paraense: 1993

América Mineiro

- Campeonato Brasileiro Série B: 1997
