= Moisés Egert =

Brazilian footballer (born 1977)

Personal information
- Full name: Laurence Moisés Camargo Egert
- Date of birth: 21 May 1977 (age 49)
- Place of birth: Caxias do Sul, Brazil
- Position: Forward

Youth career
- Juventude

Senior career*
| Years | Team | Apps | (Gls) |
- Esportivo
- Chapecoense
- Paraná
- XV de Piracicaba
| 2003 | União Barbarense | | |
- XV de Jaú
- Monte Azul
- Inter de Limeira

Managerial career
- 2007–2009: XV de Piracicaba (assistant)
- 2009: XV de Piracicaba (interim)
- 2010–2012: XV de Piracicaba
- 2012: Noroeste
- 2012: Rio Branco-SP
- 2013: União Barbarense
- 2013: Ferroviária
- 2013: São José-SP
- 2013–2014: Sertãozinho
- 2014: Velo Clube
- 2014: CRAC
- 2015: Monte Azul
- 2015: Linense
- 2016: Mirassol
- 2016: Linense
- 2017–2019: Mirassol
- 2019: Novorizontino
- 2020: Marcílio Dias
- 2020–2021: XV de Piracicaba
- 2021: Barra-SC
- 2022: Portuguesa Santista
- 2022: Primavera
- 2023: Botafogo-PB
- 2023–2024: Noroeste
- 2025–2026: XV de Piracicaba
- 2026: Maringá
- * Club domestic league appearances and goals

Laurence Moisés Camargo Egert (born 21 May 1977), known as Moisés Egert, is a Brazilian professional football coach and former player who played as a forward.

== Playing career ==
Born in Caxias do Sul, Rio Grande do Sul, Egert was a youth product of hometown side Juventude. He subsequently played for Esportivo, Chapecoense, Paraná, XV de Piracicaba, União Barbarense, XV de Jaú, Monte Azul and Inter de Limeira.

== Managerial career ==
Egert retired in 2007 due to a knee injury, and immediately became an assistant manager at XV de Piracicaba. His first managerial venture occurred in October 2009, as he was named interim manager after Lelo resigned.

Egert returned to his previous role after the appointment of Nei Silva, but was again named manager on 11 February 2010. He then achieved two consecutive promotions with the club, the second one from the Campeonato Paulista Série A2 as champions, but resigned on 13 February 2012 after a poor start in the 2012 Campeonato Paulista.

On 31 May 2012, Egert took over Rio Branco-SP, but left on 3 August after only one win in four matches. He was named in charge of Noroeste on 2 September, and won the year's Copa Paulista with the side; in November, while still in charge of Noroeste, he agreed to become the manager of União Barbarense for the ensuing season.

Egert resigned from União on 25 February 2013, and was appointed Ferroviária manager on 4 March. Late in the month, he was presented at São José-SP, but left in April after failing to qualify to the final rounds of the Paulista Série A2.

On 7 August 2013, Egert was appointed manager of Sertãozinho, but was dismissed the following 27 February. He subsequently worked at Velo Clube and CRAC during the 2014 season, and was named in charge of Monte Azul on 25 February 2015.

Egert agreed to become Linense manager on 26 May 2015, and was named at the helm of Mirassol on 3 December. He returned to Linense on 10 May 2016, before again returning to Mirassol on 8 November.

On 21 March 2019, after more than three seasons in charge of Mirassol, Egert opted to leave the club. On 3 April 2019, he was named manager of Novorizontino, but left in June after the club's elimination from the Série D.

On 3 December 2019, Egert was appointed in charge of Marcílio Dias. He resigned the following 28 September, and returned to XV de Piracicaba on 9 October 2020.

Sacked by XV on 24 May 2021, Egert was named Barra-SC manager on 21 June. After winning the Campeonato Catarinense Série B with an unbeaten status, he departed the club on 18 October, and took over Portuguesa Santista on 23 November.

Dismissed by Briosa on 17 February 2022, Egert was appointed Primavera manager on 29 August, but left after just one match on 23 September. Five days later, he was named at the helm of Botafogo-PB in the Série C.

On 22 January 2023, after five winless matches with Bota, Egert was sacked, and returned to Noroeste four days later.

On 6 November 2024, Egert returned to XV for a third spell. Sacked on 26 January 2026, after four winless matches, he took over Maringá on 13 February.

On 10 August 2026, Egert was dismissed from Dogão.

== Honours ==
XV de Piracicaba

- Campeonato Paulista Série A2: 2011
- Copa Paulista: 2025

Noroeste

- Copa Paulista: 2012

Linense

- Copa Paulista: 2015

Barra-SC

- Campeonato Catarinense Série B: 2021
