= 2025 Campeonato Brasileiro Série C =

Campeonato Brasileiro Série C
- Season: 2025
- Dates: 12 April – 25 October
- Champions: Ponte Preta (1st title)
- Promoted: Londrina; Náutico; Ponte Preta; São Bernardo
- Relegated: ABC; CSA; Retrô; Tombense
- Matches: 216
- Goals: 432 (2 per match)
- Top goalscorer: Iago Teles; Jonas Toró (8 goals each)
- Biggest away win: Ypiranga 0–4 Náutico; Group A, R6, 17 May; Retrô 0–4 Londrina; Group A, R10, 28 June
- Highest scoring: 7 goals ABC 3–4 Guarani; Group A, R17, 16 August
- Longest winning run: 6 games Ponte Preta
- Longest unbeaten run: 13 games Náutico
- Longest winless run: 15 games Tombense
- Longest losing run: 4 games Confiança; Tombense

The 2025 Campeonato Brasileiro Série C was a football competition held in Brazil, equivalent to the third division. It began on 12 April and ended on 25 October 2025.

Twenty teams competed in the tournament, twelve returning from the 2024 season, four promoted from the 2024 Campeonato Brasileiro Série D (Anápolis, Itabaiana, Maringá and Retrô) and four relegated from the 2024 Campeonato Brasileiro Série B (Brusque, Ituano, Guarani and Ponte Preta).

== Format ==
The first stage had one group where each team played the other teams in a single round-robin tournament. The top eight teams advanced to the second stage, while the bottom four were relegated. In the second stage, the teams were divided into two groups of four teams each. Each group was played on a home-and-away round-robin basis. The top two teams of each group were promoted to the Série B, while the group winners advanced to the finals.

== Teams ==
Location of teams in 2025 Série C

Pos.	Relegated from 2024 Série B
17th	Ponte Preta
18th	Ituano
19th	Brusque
20th	Guarani

Pos.	Promoted from 2024 Série D
1st	Retrô
2nd	Anápolis
3rd	Maringá
4th	Itabaiana

=== Number of teams by state ===
Number of teams	State	Team(s)
4	São Paulo	Guarani, Ituano, Ponte Preta and São Bernardo
2	Paraná	Londrina and Maringá
2	Pernambuco	Náutico and Retrô
2	Rio Grande do Sul	Caxias and Ypiranga
2	Santa Catarina	Brusque and Figueirense
2	Sergipe	Confiança and Itabaiana
1	Alagoas	CSA
1	Ceará	Floresta
1	Goiás	Anápolis
1	Minas Gerais	Tombense
1	Paraíba	Botafogo-PB
1	Rio Grande do Norte	ABC

=== Stadiums and locations ===
Team	Home city	State	Stadium	Capacity
ABC	Natal	Rio Grande do Norte	Frasqueirão	18,000
Anápolis	Anápolis	Goiás	Jonas Duarte	14,000
Botafogo-PB	João Pessoa	Paraíba	Almeidão	25,770
Brusque	Brusque	Santa Catarina	Augusto Bauer	5,000
Caxias	Caxias do Sul	Rio Grande do Sul	Centenário	22,132
Confiança	Aracaju	Sergipe	Batistão	15,575
CSA	Maceió	Alagoas	Rei Pelé	17,126
Figueirense	Florianópolis	Santa Catarina	Orlando Scarpelli	19,584
Floresta	Fortaleza	Ceará	Presidente Vargas	20,262
Guarani	Campinas	São Paulo	Brinco de Ouro	29,130
Itabaiana	Itabaiana	Sergipe	Etelvino Mendonça	12,000
Ituano	Itu	São Paulo	Novelli Júnior	18,560
Londrina	Londrina	Paraná	Estádio do Café	31,000
Maringá	Maringá	Paraná	Willie Davids	16,226
Náutico	Recife	Pernambuco	Aflitos	22,856
Ponte Preta	Campinas	São Paulo	Moisés Lucarelli	19,728
Retrô	Camaragibe	Pernambuco	Arena Pernambuco	44,300
São Bernardo	São Bernardo do Campo	São Paulo	1º de Maio	15,159
Tombense	Tombos	Minas Gerais	Almeidão	3,050
Ypiranga	Erechim	Rio Grande do Sul	Colosso da Lagoa	22,000

== Personnel and kits ==
Team	Head coach	Captain	Kit manufacturer	Kit main sponsor
ABC	(Brazil) Jonydei Tostão (caretaker)	(Brazil) Bruno Bispo	Diadora	ZeroUm, Nota Potiguar
Anápolis	(Brazil) Gabardo Júnior	(Brazil) Paulinho	Kelme	Brejeiro, ZeroUm
Botafogo-PB	(Brazil) Evaristo Piza	(Brazil) Wendel Lomar	Kappa	Loccel, ZeroUm
Brusque	(Brazil) Bernardo Franco	(Brazil) Alex Ruan	Finta	HAVAN, ZeroUm
Caxias	(Brazil) Júnior Rocha	(Brazil) Tomas Bastos	Bravo 35 (Note: Club manufactured kit)	Banrisul, ZeroUm, Postos SIM
Confiança	(Brazil) Luizinho Vieira	(Brazil) Valdo	Super Bolla	Banese Card, MC Games Bet
CSA	(Brazil) Higo Magalhães	(Brazil) Camacho	Azulão	BETesporte, Governo de Alagoas
Figueirense	(Brazil) Elio Sizenando	(Brazil) Ligger	Volt Sport	Grupo Liderança, Dalla Cervejaria
Floresta	(Brazil) Leston Júnior	(Brazil) Ícaro	Golaço	ZeroUm
Guarani	(Brazil) Matheus Costa	(Brazil) Alan Santos	Kappa	Única Saúde, ASA Alumínio, ZeroUm
Itabaiana	(Brazil) Gilson Kleina	(Brazil) Betão	Robrac	Banese Card, ZeroUm
Ituano	(Brazil) Mazola Júnior	(Brazil) Bruno Silva	Alluri Sports	ZeroUm, HARAS Coração de Cavalo
Londrina	(Brazil) Roger Silva	(Brazil) Wallace	MaxRun	OnilX, Refriko
Maringá	(Brazil) Rodrigo Chipp	(Brazil) Ronald Carvalho	Maringá	Cresol, Tayayá, UniCesumar
Náutico	(Brazil) Hélio dos Anjos	(Brazil) Vinícius	Diadora	Esportes da Sorte, CONSERT, CIMED
Ponte Preta	(Brazil) Marcelo Fernandes	(Brazil) Élvis	Diadora	GingaBet, DESKTOP
Retrô	(Brazil) Jamesson Andrade (caretaker)	(Brazil) Fabinho	LWGA Company	UNIBRA
São Bernardo	(Brazil) Ricardo Catalá	(Brazil) Hélder Maciel	Magnum	Magnum Bank, Zona de Jogo
Tombense	(Brazil) Marcelo Chamusca	(Brazil) Roger Carvalho	Vettor	None
Ypiranga	(Brazil) Raul Cabral	(Brazil) Zé Carlos	Clanel	Banrisul, Aurora, Cavaletti

=== Coaching changes ===
Team	Outgoing head coach	Manner of departure	Date of vacancy	Position in table	Incoming head coach	Date of appointment	Ref
ABC	(Brazil) Roberto Fonseca	Mutual agreement	28 August 2024	Pre-season	(Brazil) Ney Franco	15 November 2024	
Figueirense	(Brazil) João Burse	Sacked	30 August 2024	Pre-season	(Brazil) Thiago Carvalho	25 November 2024	
Floresta	(Brazil) Marcelo Cabo	Contract ended	2 September 2024	Pre-season	(Brazil) Marcelo Chamusca	13 December 2024	
Confiança	(Brazil) Mazola Júnior	Mutual agreement	3 September 2024	Pre-season	(Brazil) Waguinho Dias	23 September 2024	
Náutico	(Brazil) Bruno Pivetti	Signed by CRB	6 September 2024	Pre-season	(Brazil) Marquinhos Santos	28 September 2024	
Caxias	(Brazil) Thiago Gomes	Sacked	22 September 2024	Pre-season	(Brazil) Luizinho Vieira	24 September 2024	
Retrô	(Brazil) Itamar Schülle	Contract ended	1 October 2024	Pre-season	(Brazil) Dico Woolley	1 October 2024	
Botafogo-PB	(Brazil) Evaristo Piza	Sacked	8 October 2024	Pre-season	(Brazil) João Burse	3 November 2024	
Ypiranga	(Brazil) Thiago Carvalho	Resigned	20 October 2024	Pre-season	(Brazil) Matheus Costa	23 October 2024	
Ponte Preta	(Brazil) João Brigatti	Moved to coordinator role	22 November 2024	Pre-season	(Brazil) Alberto Valentim	26 November 2024	
Ituano	(Brazil) Chico Elias	End of caretaker spell	24 November 2024	Pre-season	(Brazil) Vinicius Munhoz	18 December 2024	
Brusque	(Brazil) Marcelo Cabo	Contract ended	25 November 2024	Pre-season	(Portugal) Filipe Gouveia	6 January 2025	
Guarani	(Brazil) Allan Aal	Mutual agreement	25 November 2024	Pre-season	(Brazil) Maurício Souza	4 December 2024	
Retrô	(Brazil) Dico Woolley	Sacked	12 January 2025	State leagues	(Brazil) Evaristo Piza (Note: Wilton Bezerra was the caretaker head coach in a Campeonato Pernambucano match against Sport on 18 January.)	17 January 2025	
Ituano	(Brazil) Vinicius Munhoz	Sacked	13 February 2025	State leagues	(Brazil) Chico Elias (caretaker)	14 February 2025	
ABC	(Brazil) Ney Franco	Sacked	24 February 2025	State leagues	(Brazil) Evaristo Piza	27 February 2025	
Ituano	(Brazil) Chico Elias	End of caretaker spell	24 February 2025	State leagues	(Brazil) Mazola Júnior	24 February 2025	
Retrô	(Brazil) Evaristo Piza	Mutual agreement	27 February 2025	State leagues	(Brazil) Wíres Souza (caretaker)	1 March 2025	
Floresta	(Brazil) Marcelo Chamusca	Sacked	5 March 2025	State leagues	(Brazil) Leston Júnior	6 March 2025	
Retrô	(Brazil) Wíres Souza	End of caretaker spell	2 April 2025	State leagues	(Brazil) Milton Mendes	27 March 2025	
Botafogo-PB	(Brazil) João Burse	Sacked	2 April 2025	State leagues	(Brazil) Antônio Carlos Zago	7 April 2025	
Náutico	(Brazil) Marquinhos Santos	Sacked	14 April 2025	17th	(Brazil) Hélio dos Anjos	15 April 2025	
Caxias	(Brazil) Luizinho Vieira	Sacked	22 April 2025	9th	(Brazil) Júnior Rocha	22 April 2025	
Guarani	(Brazil) Maurício Souza	Sacked	22 April 2025	19th	(Brazil) Marcelo Cordeiro (caretaker)	22 April 2025	
Confiança	(Brazil) Waguinho Dias	Sacked	28 April 2025	14th	(Brazil) Luizinho Vieira	28 April 2025	
Figueirense	(Brazil) Thiago Carvalho	Sacked	28 April 2025	17th	(Brazil) Pintado	29 April 2025	
Guarani	(Brazil) Marcelo Cordeiro	End of caretaker spell	29 April 2025	20th	(Brazil) Marcelo Fernandes	30 April 2025	
Retrô	(Brazil) Milton Mendes	Sacked	11 May 2025	15th	(Brazil) Wíres Souza	11 May 2025	
Botafogo-PB	(Brazil) Antônio Carlos Zago	Sacked	12 May 2025	13th	(Brazil) Márcio Fernandes	12 May 2025	
Itabaiana	(Brazil) Roberto Cavalo	Sacked	2 June 2025	17th	(Brazil) Gilson Kleina	4 June 2025	
Londrina	(Brazil) Claudinei Oliveira	Resigned	4 June 2025	5th	(Brazil) Roger Silva	7 June 2025	
Anápolis	(Brazil) Ângelo Luiz	Sacked	17 June 2025	20th	(Brazil) Gabardo Júnior	18 June 2025	
Retrô	(Brazil) Wíres Souza	Sacked	20 June 2025	17th	(Brazil) Itamar Schülle	21 June 2025	
ABC	(Brazil) Evaristo Piza	Sacked	30 June 2025	15th	(Brazil) Rodrigo Santana	2 July 2025	
Botafogo-PB	(Brazil) Márcio Fernandes	Sacked	2 July 2025	17th	(Brazil) Zé Carlos (caretaker)	7 July 2025	
Botafogo-PB	(Brazil) Zé Carlos	End of caretaker spell	8 July 2025	17th	(Brazil) Evaristo Piza	8 July 2025	
Brusque	(Portugal) Filipe Gouveia	Mutual agreement	10 July 2025	11th	(Brazil) Bernardo Franco	10 July 2025	
Tombense	(Brazil) Raul Cabral	Sacked	13 July 2025	17th	(Brazil) Marcelo Chamusca	13 July 2025	
Guarani	(Brazil) Marcelo Fernandes	Sacked	26 July 2025	12th	(Brazil) Matheus Costa	28 July 2025	
CSA	(Brazil) Higo Magalhães	Sacked	27 July 2025	9th	(Brazil) Márcio Fernandes	28 July 2025	
Ypiranga	(Brazil) Matheus Costa	Resigned	27 July 2025	6th	(Brazil) Raul Cabral	28 July 2025	
Maringá	(Brazil) Jorge Castilho	Sacked	31 July 2025	13th	(Brazil) Cyro Bueno (caretaker)	2 August 2025	
Maringá	(Brazil) Cyro Bueno	End of caretaker spell	4 August 2025	13th	(Brazil) Rodrigo Chipp	4 August 2025	
Ponte Preta	(Brazil) Alberto Valentim	Signed by América Mineiro	11 August 2025	3rd	(Brazil) Marcelo Fernandes	12 August 2025	
Figueirense	(Brazil) Pintado	Sacked	11 August 2025	17th	(Brazil) Elio Sizenando	13 August 2025	
CSA	(Brazil) Márcio Fernandes	Mutual agreement	12 August 2025	9th	(Brazil) Higo Magalhães	13 August 2025	
Retrô	(Brazil) Itamar Schülle	Sacked	18 August 2025	19th	(Brazil) Jamesson Andrade (caretaker)	18 August 2025	
ABC	(Brazil) Rodrigo Santana	Sacked	18 August 2025	18th	(Brazil) Jonydei Tostão (caretaker)	18 August 2025	

== First stage ==
In the first stage, each team played the other nineteen teams in a single round-robin tournament. The teams were ranked according to points (3 points for a win, 1 point for a draw, and 0 points for a loss). If tied on points, the following criteria would be used to determine the ranking: 1. Wins; 2. Goal difference; 3. Goals scored; 4. Fewest red cards; 5. Fewest yellow cards; 6. Draw in the headquarters of the Brazilian Football Confederation (Regulations Article 16).

The top eight teams advanced to the second stage, while the bottom four were relegated to Série D.

=== Group A ===
Pos	Team	Pld	W	D	L	GF	GA	GD	Pts	Qualification or relegation
1	Caxias	19	12	1	6	26	21	+5	37	Advance to Second stage
2	Ponte Preta	19	11	3	5	20	16	+4	36	Advance to Second stage
3	Náutico	19	10	6	3	25	7	+18	36	Advance to Second stage
4	Londrina	19	8	6	5	27	19	+8	30	Advance to Second stage
5	São Bernardo	19	8	6	5	19	15	+4	30	Advance to Second stage
6	Brusque	19	8	4	7	20	17	+3	28	Advance to Second stage
7	Guarani	19	7	6	6	20	20	0	27	Advance to Second stage
8	Floresta	19	7	6	6	15	15	0	27	Advance to Second stage
9	Confiança	19	7	5	7	21	22	−1	26	
10	Ypiranga	19	7	4	8	17	21	−4	25	
11	Maringá	19	5	10	4	26	24	+2	25	
12	Ituano	19	6	6	7	19	24	−5	24	
13	Botafogo-PB	19	6	5	8	22	21	+1	23	
14	Figueirense	19	5	8	6	21	18	+3	23	
15	Anápolis	19	5	8	6	16	19	−3	23	
16	Itabaiana	19	6	4	9	16	20	−4	22	
17	CSA (R)	19	5	7	7	21	23	−2	22	Relegation to 2026 Campeonato Brasileiro Série D
18	ABC (R)	19	2	12	5	20	25	−5	18	Relegation to 2026 Campeonato Brasileiro Série D
19	Retrô (R)	19	3	5	11	7	22	−15	14	Relegation to 2026 Campeonato Brasileiro Série D
20	Tombense (R)	19	2	8	9	14	23	−9	14	Relegation to 2026 Campeonato Brasileiro Série D

Source: CBF
Rules for classification: 1) points; 2) wins; 3) goal difference; 4) goals scored; 5) fewest red cards; 6) fewest yellow cards; 7) draw.
(R) Relegated

=== Results ===
Home \ Away	ABC	ANA	BOT	BRU	CAX	CON	CSA	FIG	FLO	GUA	ITA	ITU	LON	MAR	NAU	PON	RET	SBE	TOM	YPI
ABC		3–3					1–1	0–0		3–4	0–1	2–3		3–3	0–0					0–3
Anápolis			2–0	2–1					0–0	2–0	1–0	0–1		1–1			0–0			0–0
Botafogo-PB	0–0			1–3	1–2	3–0			2–3				2–0			2–1	1–0	1–1	1–0	
Brusque	0–1						2–0	0–2		1–0	0–0		1–2				1–2	1–0	0–0	1–0
Caxias	1–0	1–0		0–1					1–0	2–0		2–1	4–2			2–1	2–1			
Confiança	1–1	2–0		4–1	2–1				1–0				0–2			1–2	1–0		3–2	
CSA		1–1	2–1		2–3	0–0		1–1	2–0			2–2		3–2	2–1	1–2				
Figueirense		1–2	1–0		2–3	1–1			1–0			2–0		1–1	0–0	1–1				
Floresta	1–1			2–1						0–0	1–0		0–2				1–0	2–0	1–0	2–1
Guarani			2–1			1–0	1–0	0–0			2–1	0–0		2–3	0–1			0–1		2–1
Itabaiana			1–0		2–1	0–0	1–0	1–1				3–1		2–2	2–1			0–1		
Ituano			0–3	0–0		1–2			0–0				1–0			0–1	2–0	1–1	3–1	2–1
Londrina	1–1	1–1					3–1	2–1		1–1	2–0			1–1	0–2				1–1	3–1
Maringá			1–1	0–2	3–0	3–2			1–1			1–1				0–1	1–0	1–0		
Náutico		1–0	0–0	0–0	2–0	2–0			0–0			3–0		2–1		0–1	3–0			
Ponte Preta	0–0	2–0		1–4					2–1	1–1	1–0		1–0				1–0		1–0	0–1
Retrô	1–1						0–0	2–1		0–2	1–0		0–4					0–1	0–0	0–0
São Bernardo	1–1	3–0			1–0	1–1	1–3	0–3					0–0		1–1	2–0			2–0	
Tombense	1–2	1–1			0–0		0–0	3–2		2–2	2–0			1–1	0–2					
Ypiranga			2–2		0–1	1–0	1–0	1–0			3–2			0–0	0–4			0–2	1–0	

Source: CBF
Legend: Blue = home team win; Yellow = draw; Red = away team win.

== Second stage ==
In the second stage, each group was played on a home-and-away round-robin basis. The teams were ranked according to points (3 points for a win, 1 point for a draw, and 0 points for a loss). If tied on points, the following criteria would be used to determine the ranking: 1. Wins; 2. Goal difference; 3. Goals scored; 4. Head-to-head (if the tie was only between two teams); 5. Fewest red cards; 6. Fewest yellow cards; 7. Draw in the headquarters of the Brazilian Football Confederation (Regulations Article 20).

The top two teams of each group were promoted to the Série B. Group winners advanced to the finals.

=== Group B ===
Pos	Team	Pld	W	D	L	GF	GA	GD	Pts	Qualification
1	Londrina (P)	6	2	4	0	6	4	+2	10	Advance to Finals and promoted to 2026 Série B
2	São Bernardo (P)	6	1	4	1	4	4	0	7	Promoted to 2026 Série B
3	Floresta	6	1	4	1	2	2	0	7	
4	Caxias	6	0	4	2	2	4	−2	4	

Source: CBF
Rules for classification: 1) points; 2) wins; 3) goal difference; 4) goals scored; 5) head-to-head results (only between 2 teams); 6) fewest red cards; 7) fewest yellow cards; 8) draw.
(P) Promoted

==== Results ====
Home \ Away	CAX	FLO	LON	SBE
Caxias		1–1	0–1	0–0
Floresta	0–0		0–1	0–0
Londrina	1–1	0–0		1–1
São Bernardo	1–0	0–1	2–2	

Source: CBF
Legend: Blue = home team win; Yellow = draw; Red = away team win.

=== Group C ===
Pos	Team	Pld	W	D	L	GF	GA	GD	Pts	Qualification
1	Ponte Preta (P)	6	4	1	1	7	3	+4	13	Advance to Finals and promoted to 2026 Série B
2	Náutico (P)	6	2	2	2	5	6	−1	8	Promoted to 2026 Série B
3	Guarani	6	2	1	3	6	7	−1	7	
4	Brusque	6	2	0	4	6	8	−2	6	

Source: CBF
Rules for classification: 1) points; 2) wins; 3) goal difference; 4) goals scored; 5) head-to-head results (only between 2 teams); 6) fewest red cards; 7) fewest yellow cards; 8) draw.
(P) Promoted

==== Results ====
Home \ Away	BRU	GUA	NAU	PON
Brusque		3–2	0–1	2–1
Guarani	1–0		1–1	0–1
Náutico	2–1	0–2		0–1
Ponte Preta	1–0	2–0	1–1	

Source: CBF
Legend: Blue = home team win; Yellow = draw; Red = away team win.

== Finals ==
The finals were played on a home-and-away two-legged basis, with the higher-seeded team hosting the second leg. If tied on aggregate, the away goals rule would not be used, extra time would not be played, and the penalty shoot-out would be used to determine the champions (Regulations Article 21).

The finalists were seeded according to their performance in the tournament. The teams were ranked according to overall points. If tied on overall points, the following criteria would be used to determine the ranking: 1. Overall wins; 2. Overall goal difference; 3. Draw in the headquarters of the Brazilian Football Confederation (Regulations Article 22).

Pos	Team	Pld	W	D	L	GF	GA	GD	Pts	Host
1	(São Paulo (state)) Ponte Preta	25	15	4	6	27	19	+8	49	2nd leg
2	(Paraná (state)) Londrina	25	10	10	5	33	23	+10	40	1st leg

Source: CBF

The matches were played on 18 and 25 October 2025.

Team 1	Agg.	Team 2	1st leg	2nd leg
Londrina (Paraná (state))	0–2	(São Paulo (state)) Ponte Preta	0–0	0–2

=== Matches ===
18 October 2025
17:00

Londrina (Paraná (state))	0–0	(São Paulo (state)) Ponte Preta
	Report

Estádio Vitorino Gonçalves Dias, Londrina
Attendance: 8,003
Referee: André Luiz Skettino Policarpo Bento (Minas Gerais)

25 October 2025
17:00

Ponte Preta (São Paulo (state))	2–0	(Paraná (state)) Londrina
Jonas Toró 48'; Élvis 72' (pen.)	Report

Estádio Moisés Lucarelli, Campinas
Attendance: 14,623
Referee: Felipe Fernandes de Lima (Minas Gerais)

== Top goalscorers ==
Rank	Player	Club	Goals
1	(Brazil) Iago Teles	Londrina	8
1	(Brazil) Jonas Toró	Ponte Preta	8
3	(Brazil) Diego Mathias	Brusque	7
3	(Brazil) Élvis	Ponte Preta	7
5	(Brazil) Bruno Santos	Guarani	6
5	(Brazil) Maranhão	Maringá	6
5	(Brazil) Tiago Marques	CSA	6

Source: CBF
