= 2023 Campeonato Brasileiro Série C =

Campeonato Brasileiro Série C
- Season: 2023
- Dates: 2 May – 22 October
- Champions: Amazonas (1st title)
- Promoted: Amazonas; Brusque; Operário Ferroviário; Paysandu
- Relegated: Altos; América de Natal; Manaus; Pouso Alegre
- Matches: 216
- Goals: 465 (2.15 per match)
- Top goalscorer: Sassá (18 goals)
- Biggest home win: Ypiranga 5–0 Paysandu; Group A, R3, 11 May
- Biggest away win: Manaus 1–4 São José; Group A, R9, 18 June; São Bernardo 0–3 Volta Redonda; Group A, R9, 19 June
- Highest scoring: 7 goals Brusque 4–3 Operário Ferroviário; Group B, R3, 17 September
- Longest winning run: 5 games Brusque
- Longest unbeaten run: 10 games Amazonas
- Longest winless run: 14 games Altos
- Longest losing run: 9 games Pouso Alegre
- Highest attendance: 45,027; Paysandu 1–2 Amazonas; Group C, R5, 1 October
- Lowest attendance: 25; Ypiranga 1–1 Botafogo-PB; Group A, R19, 26 August
- Total attendance: 818.983
- Average attendance: 3,792

The 2023 Campeonato Brasileiro Série C was a football competition held in Brazil, equivalent to the third division. It began on 2 May and ended on 22 October 2023.

Twenty teams competed in the tournament, twelve returning from the 2022 season, four promoted from the 2022 Campeonato Brasileiro Série D (Amazonas, América de Natal, Pouso Alegre and São Bernardo) and four relegated from the 2022 Campeonato Brasileiro Série B (Brusque, CSA, Náutico and Operário Ferroviário).

Amazonas, Brusque, Operário Ferroviário and Paysandu were promoted to the 2024 Campeonato Brasileiro Série B, while Altos, América de Natal, Manaus, and Pouso Alegre were relegated to the 2024 Campeonato Brasileiro Série D.

In the finals, Amazonas won their first title after defeating Brusque 2–1 on aggregate.

== Format ==
The first stage had one group where each team played the other teams in a single round-robin tournament. The top eight teams advanced to the second stage, while the bottom four were relegated. In the second stage, the teams were divided into two groups of four teams each. Each group was played on a home-and-away round-robin basis. The top two teams of each group were promoted to the Série B, while the group winners advanced to the finals.

== Teams ==
Location of teams in 2023 Série C

| Pos. | Relegated from 2022 Série B |
|---|---|
| 17th | CSA |
| 18th | Brusque |
| 19th | Operário Ferroviário |
| 20th | Náutico |

| Pos. | Promoted from 2022 Série D |
|---|---|
| 1st | América de Natal |
| 2nd | Pouso Alegre |
| 3rd | Amazonas |
| 4th | São Bernardo |

=== Number of teams by state ===
| Number of teams | State | Team(s) |
|---|---|---|
| 2 | Amazonas | Amazonas and Manaus |
| 2 | Pará | Paysandu and Remo |
| 2 | Rio Grande do Sul | São José and Ypiranga |
| 2 | Santa Catarina | Brusque and Figueirense |
| 1 | Alagoas | CSA |
| 1 | Ceará | Floresta |
| 1 | Goiás | Aparecidense |
| 1 | Minas Gerais | Pouso Alegre |
| 1 | Paraíba | Botafogo-PB |
| 1 | Paraná | Operário Ferroviário |
| 1 | Pernambuco | Náutico |
| 1 | Piauí | Altos |
| 1 | Rio de Janeiro | Volta Redonda |
| 1 | Rio Grande do Norte | América de Natal |
| 1 | São Paulo | São Bernardo |
| 1 | Sergipe | Confiança |

=== Stadiums and locations ===
| Team | Home city | State | Stadium | Capacity |
|---|---|---|---|---|
| Altos | Altos | Piauí | Felipe Raulino | 4,000 |
| Amazonas | Manaus | Amazonas | Carlos Zamith | 5,000 |
| América de Natal | Natal | Rio Grande do Norte | Arena das Dunas | 31,375 |
| Aparecidense | Aparecida de Goiânia | Goiás | Annibal Batista de Toledo | 6,645 |
| Botafogo-PB | João Pessoa | Paraíba | Almeidão | 25,770 |
| Brusque | Brusque | Santa Catarina | Augusto Bauer | 5,000 |
| Confiança | Aracaju | Sergipe | Batistão | 15,575 |
| CSA | Maceió | Alagoas | Rei Pelé | 17,126 |
| Figueirense | Florianópolis | Santa Catarina | Orlando Scarpelli | 19,584 |
| Floresta | Fortaleza | Ceará | Domingão | 10,500 |
| Manaus | Manaus | Amazonas | Arena da Amazônia | 44,000 |
| Náutico | Recife | Pernambuco | Aflitos | 22,856 |
| Operário Ferroviário | Ponta Grossa | Paraná | Germano Krüger | 10,632 |
| Paysandu | Belém | Pará | Estádio da Curuzu | 16,200 |
| Pouso Alegre | Pouso Alegre | Minas Gerais | Manduzão | 26,000 |
| Remo | Belém | Pará | Baenão | 13,792 |
| São Bernardo | São Bernardo do Campo | São Paulo | 1º de Maio | 15,159 |
| São José | Porto Alegre | Rio Grande do Sul | Passo D'Areia | 15,000 |
| Volta Redonda | Volta Redonda | Rio de Janeiro | Raulino de Oliveira | 20,255 |
| Ypiranga | Erechim | Rio Grande do Sul | Colosso da Lagoa | 22,000 |

== Personnel and kits ==
| Team | Head coach | Captain | Kit manufacturer | Kit main sponsor |
|---|---|---|---|---|
| Altos | (Brazil) Cristiano Bassoli | (Brazil) Dos Santos | Tolledo Sports | BET7K |
| Amazonas | (Brazil) Luizinho Vieira | (Brazil) Sassá | Onça (club manufactured kit) | Governo do Estado do Amazonas |
| América de Natal | (Brazil) Dado Cavalcanti | (Brazil) Jean Pierre | Mecão (club manufactured kit) | Esportes da Sorte |
| Aparecidense | (Brazil) Hemerson Maria | (Brazil) Robert | Tolledo Sports | LAS |
| Botafogo-PB | (Brazil) Felipe Surian | (Brazil) Mota | LWGA Company | TVBet |
| Brusque | (Brazil) Luizinho Lopes | (Brazil) Wallace | Finta | Bompack |
| Confiança | ~~(Brazil) Luizinho Vieira~~ (Note: Vieira was the head coach of Confiança during the first stage, but took over Amazonas during the second stage, after Confiança were already knocked out of the competition) | (Brazil) Adalberto | Super Bolla | Mulvi Pay |
| CSA | (Brazil) Marcelo Cabo | (Brazil) Ernandes | Volt Sport | Champion Watch |
| Figueirense | (Brazil) Paulo Baier | (Brazil) Wilson | Volt Sport | Aposta Ganha |
| Floresta | (Brazil) Matheus Costa | (Brazil) Ricardinho | Golaço | |
| Manaus | (Brazil) Roger Silva | (Brazil) Bruno Bispo | Super Bolla | Bemol |
| Náutico | (Brazil) Bruno Pivetti | (Brazil) Victor Ferraz | NSeis (club manufactured kit) | Betnacional |
| Operário Ferroviário | (Brazil) Rafael Guanaes | (Brazil) Rafael Santos | Karilu | Philips Áudio e Vídeo |
| Paysandu | (Brazil) Hélio dos Anjos | (Brazil) Robinho | Lobo (club manufactured kit) | Banpará |
| Pouso Alegre | (Brazil) Juarez Leite | (Brazil) Rayan Ribeiro | Kick Ball | BRZ Empreendimentos |
| Remo | (Brazil) Ricardo Catalá | (Brazil) Vinícius | Volt Sport | Banpará |
| São Bernardo | (Brazil) Márcio Zanardi | (Brazil) Rodrigo Souza | Magnum (club manufactured kit) | Magnum Bank |
| São José | (Brazil) Thiago Gomes | (Brazil) Fábio Rampi | Weefe | Banrisul |
| Volta Redonda | (Brazil) Rogério Corrêa | (Brazil) Bruno Barra | Pratic Sport | Universidade de Vassouras |
| Ypiranga | (Brazil) Jerson Testoni | (Brazil) Heitor | Clanel | Banrisul, Aurora |

=== Coaching changes ===
| Team | Outgoing head coach | Manner of departure | Date of vacancy | Position in table | Incoming head coach | Date of appointment | Ref |
|---|---|---|---|---|---|---|---|
| Manaus | (Brazil) Evaristo Piza | Sacked | 13 August 2022 | Pre-season | (Brazil) Paulo Henrique Marques | 19 October 2022 | |
| São José | (Brazil) Paulo Henrique Marques | Sacked | 15 August 2022 | Pre-season | (Brazil) Thiago Gomes | 10 September 2022 | |
| Remo | (Brazil) Gerson Gusmão | Sacked | 16 August 2022 | Pre-season | (Brazil) Marcelo Cabo | 24 October 2022 | |
| Botafogo-PB | (Brazil) Itamar Schülle | End of contract | 23 August 2022 | Pre-season | (Brazil) Moisés Egert | 28 September 2022 | |
| Pouso Alegre | (Brazil) Paulo Roberto Santos | Signed by São Bento | 3 October 2022 | Pre-season | (Brazil) Eugênio Souza | 27 November 2022 | |
| Floresta | (Brazil) Leston Júnior | Sacked | 25 October 2022 | Pre-season | (Brazil) Raimundo Wágner | 30 November 2022 | |
| Figueirense | (Brazil) Júnior Rocha | End of contract | 2 November 2022 | Pre-season | (Brazil) Cristóvão Borges | 17 November 2022 | |
| Brusque | (Brazil) Gilson Kleina | End of contract | 5 November 2022 | Pre-season | (Brazil) Luizinho Lopes | 11 November 2022 | |
| Operário Ferroviário | (Brazil) Sandro Forner | End of caretaker spell | 6 November 2022 | Pre-season | (Brazil) Rafael Guanaes | 1 November 2022 | |
| CSA | (Brazil) Adriano Rodrigues | Sacked | 4 December 2022 | Pre-season | (Brazil) Roberto Fonseca | 5 December 2022 | |
| Botafogo-PB | (Brazil) Moisés Egert | Sacked | 22 January 2023 | State leagues | (Brazil) Francisco Diá | 23 January 2023 | |
| Altos | (Brazil) Fernando Tonet | Sacked | 2 February 2023 | State leagues | (Brazil) Jerson Testoni | 2 February 2023 | |
| CSA | (Brazil) Roberto Fonseca | Sacked | 2 February 2023 | State leagues | (Brazil) Bebeto Moraes (caretaker) | 3 February 2023 | |
| CSA | (Brazil) Bebeto Moraes | End of caretaker spell | 22 February 2023 | State leagues | (Brazil) Vinícius Bergantin | 21 February 2023 | |
| Manaus | (Brazil) Paulo Henrique Marques | Resigned | 23 February 2023 | State leagues | (Brazil) Higo Magalhães (Note: Victor Lenine was the caretaker head coach in a Campeonato Amazonense match against Amazonas on 25 February) | 24 February 2023 | |
| Botafogo-PB | (Brazil) Francisco Diá | Sacked | 3 March 2023 | State leagues | (Brazil) Tiago Batizoco (caretaker) | 5 March 2023 | |
| Pouso Alegre | (Brazil) Eugênio Souza | Sacked | 6 March 2023 | State leagues | (Brazil) Heriberto da Cunha (caretaker) | 10 March 2023 | |
| Pouso Alegre | (Brazil) Heriberto da Cunha | End of caretaker spell | 19 March 2023 | State leagues | (Brazil) Roger Silva | 19 March 2023 | |
| Figueirense | (Brazil) Cristóvão Borges | Sacked | 19 March 2023 | State leagues | (Brazil) Douglas Bazolli (caretaker) | 20 March 2023 | |
| Botafogo-PB | (Brazil) Tiago Batizoco | End of caretaker spell | 1 April 2023 | State leagues | (Brazil) Felipe Surian | 1 April 2023 | |
| América de Natal | (Brazil) Leandro Sena | Sacked | 5 April 2023 | State leagues | (Brazil) Thiago Carvalho | 13 April 2023 | |
| Figueirense | (Brazil) Douglas Bazolli | End of caretaker spell | 17 April 2023 | State leagues | (Brazil) Roberto Fonseca | 17 April 2023 | |
| Floresta | (Brazil) Raimundo Wágner | Demoted to under-20 head coach | 18 April 2023 | State leagues | (Brazil) Gerson Gusmão | 18 April 2023 | |
| Paysandu | (Brazil) Márcio Fernandes | Sacked | 29 April 2023 | State leagues | (Brazil) Marquinhos Santos (Note: Wilton Bezerra was the caretaker head coach on the 1st round against Aparecidense on 3 May) | 1 May 2023 | |
| Náutico | (Brazil) Dado Cavalcanti | Sacked | 15 May 2023 | 14th | (Brazil) Otávio Augusto (caretaker) | 15 May 2023 | |
| Altos | (Brazil) Jerson Testoni | Sacked | 16 May 2023 | 17th | (Brazil) Sérgio Soares | 16 May 2023 | |
| Remo | (Brazil) Marcelo Cabo | Mutual agreement | 23 May 2023 | 20th | (Brazil) Ricardo Catalá (Note: Fábio Cortez was the caretaker head coach in a Campeonato Paraense match against Águia de Marabá on 26 May) | 25 May 2023 | |
| Náutico | (Brazil) Otávio Augusto | End of caretaker spell | 28 May 2023 | 11th | (Brazil) Fernando Marchiori | 28 May 2023 | |
| Aparecidense | (Brazil) Moacir Júnior | Mutual agreement | 9 June 2023 | 18th | (Brazil) Hemerson Maria | 11 June 2023 | |
| Figueirense | (Brazil) Roberto Fonseca | Sacked | 13 June 2023 | 12th | (Brazil) Paulo Baier | 14 June 2023 | |
| Manaus | (Brazil) Higo Magalhães | Sacked | 19 June 2023 | 17th | (Brazil) Moacir Júnior | 20 June 2023 | |
| Floresta | (Brazil) Gerson Gusmão | Sacked | 20 June 2023 | 16th | (Brazil) Fernando Alves (caretaker) | 22 June 2023 | |
| CSA | (Brazil) Vinícius Bergantin | Sacked | 21 June 2023 | 10th | (Brazil) Marcelo Cabo | 21 June 2023 | |
| Altos | (Brazil) Sérgio Soares | Sacked | 26 June 2023 | 17th | (Brazil) Luan Carlos | 27 June 2023 | |
| Floresta | (Brazil) Fernando Alves | End of caretaker spell | 27 June 2023 | 19th | (Brazil) Sérgio Soares | 27 June 2023 | |
| Paysandu | (Brazil) Marquinhos Santos | Sacked | 28 June 2023 | 15th | (Brazil) Hélio dos Anjos | 28 June 2023 | |
| Pouso Alegre | (Brazil) Roger Silva | Sacked | 3 July 2023 | 15th | (Brazil) Rogério Henrique | 4 July 2023 | |
| América de Natal | (Brazil) Thiago Carvalho | Sacked | 10 July 2023 | 19th | (Brazil) Dado Cavalcanti | 10 July 2023 | |
| Ypiranga | (Brazil) Luizinho Vieira | Sacked | 11 July 2023 | 11th | (Brazil) Jerson Testoni | 11 July 2023 | |
| Confiança | (Brazil) Vinícius Eutrópio | Sacked | 17 July 2023 | 12th | (Brazil) Luizinho Vieira | 17 July 2023 | |
| Altos | (Brazil) Luan Carlos | Resigned | 24 July 2023 | 20th | (Brazil) Cristiano Bassoli | 24 July 2023 | |
| Manaus | (Brazil) Moacir Júnior | Sacked | 25 July 2023 | 16th | (Brazil) Roger Silva | 26 July 2023 | |
| Pouso Alegre | (Brazil) Rogério Henrique | Resigned | 7 August 2023 | 20th | (Brazil) Juarez Leite | 10 August 2023 | |
| Floresta | (Brazil) Sérgio Soares | Mutual agreement | 8 August 2023 | 17th | (Brazil) Matheus Costa | 9 August 2023 | |
| Náutico | (Brazil) Fernando Marchiori | Sacked | 13 August 2023 | 9th | (Brazil) Bruno Pivetti | 14 August 2023 | |
| Amazonas | (Brazil) Rafael Lacerda | Sacked | 11 September 2023 | 4th (Group C) | (Brazil) Luizinho Vieira | 11 September 2023 | |

== First stage ==
In the first stage, each team played the other nineteen teams in a single round-robin tournament. The teams were ranked according to points (3 points for a win, 1 point for a draw, and 0 points for a loss). If tied on points, the following criteria would be used to determine the ranking: 1. Wins; 2. Goal difference; 3. Goals scored; 4. Fewest red cards; 5. Fewest yellow cards; 6. Draw in the headquarters of the Brazilian Football Confederation (Regulations Article 16).

The top eight teams advanced to the second stage, while the bottom four were relegated to Série D.

=== Group A ===
| Pos | Team | Pld | W | D | L | GF | GA | GD | Pts | Qualification or relegation |
|---|---|---|---|---|---|---|---|---|---|---|
| 1 | Operário Ferroviário | 19 | 10 | 6 | 3 | 19 | 10 | +9 | 36 | Advance to Second stage |
| 2 | Volta Redonda | 19 | 10 | 3 | 6 | 33 | 19 | +14 | 33 | Advance to Second stage |
| 3 | Amazonas | 19 | 9 | 5 | 5 | 23 | 20 | +3 | 32 | Advance to Second stage |
| 4 | Brusque | 19 | 9 | 4 | 6 | 25 | 14 | +11 | 31 | Advance to Second stage |
| 5 | São José | 19 | 8 | 7 | 4 | 30 | 21 | +9 | 31 | Advance to Second stage |
| 6 | Botafogo-PB | 19 | 7 | 9 | 3 | 25 | 20 | +5 | 30 | Advance to Second stage |
| 7 | Paysandu | 19 | 8 | 5 | 6 | 21 | 26 | −5 | 29 | Advance to Second stage |
| 8 | São Bernardo | 19 | 7 | 8 | 4 | 20 | 17 | +3 | 29 | Advance to Second stage |
| 9 | Confiança | 19 | 8 | 4 | 7 | 23 | 26 | −3 | 28 | |
| 10 | Náutico | 19 | 6 | 9 | 4 | 25 | 24 | +1 | 27 | |
| 11 | Remo | 19 | 6 | 7 | 6 | 20 | 18 | +2 | 25 | |
| 12 | CSA | 19 | 5 | 9 | 5 | 15 | 13 | +2 | 24 | |
| 13 | Ypiranga | 19 | 6 | 5 | 8 | 26 | 23 | +3 | 23 | |
| 14 | Floresta | 19 | 5 | 8 | 6 | 14 | 17 | −3 | 23 | |
| 15 | Aparecidense | 19 | 6 | 4 | 9 | 17 | 20 | −3 | 22 | |
| 16 | Figueirense | 19 | 5 | 7 | 7 | 19 | 18 | +1 | 22 | |
| 17 | Manaus (R) | 19 | 5 | 5 | 9 | 13 | 24 | −11 | 20 | Relegation to 2024 Campeonato Brasileiro Série D |
| 18 | América de Natal (R) | 19 | 4 | 7 | 8 | 12 | 21 | −9 | 19 | Relegation to 2024 Campeonato Brasileiro Série D |
| 19 | Altos (R) | 19 | 2 | 7 | 10 | 14 | 28 | −14 | 13 | Relegation to 2024 Campeonato Brasileiro Série D |
| 20 | Pouso Alegre (R) | 19 | 3 | 3 | 13 | 11 | 26 | −15 | 12 | Relegation to 2024 Campeonato Brasileiro Série D |

Source: CBF
Rules for classification: 1) points; 2) wins; 3) goal difference; 4) goals scored; 5) fewest red cards; 6) fewest yellow cards; 7) draw.
(R) Relegated

=== Results ===
| Home \ Away | ALT | AMA | AME | APA | BOT | BRU | CON | CSA | FIG | FLO | MAN | NAU | OPE | PAY | POU | REM | SBE | SJO | VOL | YPI |
|---|---|---|---|---|---|---|---|---|---|---|---|---|---|---|---|---|---|---|---|---|
| Altos | | 2–3 | 1–1 | | 0–1 | | | 1–1 | 0–0 | | | | 0–1 | 1–1 | 0–0 | | | | | 3–2 |
| Amazonas | | | 2–0 | 0–0 | 0–0 | | | 1–0 | | | 2–0 | | 2–2 | 1–2 | 2–1 | | | | | 0–0 |
| América de Natal | | | | 0–0 | 2–2 | 2–1 | 0–1 | | | | 1–2 | | 1–0 | 1–1 | 2–0 | | | | | 1–2 |
| Aparecidense | 1–2 | | | | | 0–2 | 1–0 | | | 0–0 | 1–0 | 3–0 | | | | 0–2 | 1–2 | 2–1 | 2–3 | |
| Botafogo-PB | | | | 2–1 | | 1–2 | 2–3 | | | 1–1 | 2–0 | 1–1 | 2–1 | 3–2 | 1–1 | | | 1–1 | | |
| Brusque | 3–0 | 1–0 | | | | | 4–0 | | 0–1 | 2–0 | | 2–2 | | | | 1–1 | 0–0 | 0–1 | 3–2 | |
| Confiança | 2–1 | 2–3 | | | | | | | 1–0 | 3–1 | | 2–2 | 1–0 | 1–0 | | | | | 0–1 | 1–1 |
| CSA | | | 0–1 | 1–1 | 1–1 | 0–0 | 0–1 | | | | 2–1 | | | | 2–1 | 0–0 | 1–0 | 2–0 | | |
| Figueirense | | 0–1 | 3–0 | 2–1 | 1–2 | | | 1–1 | | | 0–0 | | 0–0 | 2–0 | 1–2 | | | | | 2–0 |
| Floresta | 0–0 | 1–1 | 1–0 | | | | | 0–2 | 1–1 | | | | | | | 0–0 | 2–0 | | 2–1 | 2–0 |
| Manaus | 1–0 | | | | | 0–2 | 3–3 | | | 0–0 | | 2–1 | | | | 1–1 | 0–0 | 1–4 | 1–0 | |
| Náutico | 1–0 | 0–1 | 0–0 | | | | | 0–0 | 2–1 | 3–1 | | | | | | 0–0 | 2–2 | 2–1 | 2–0 | |
| Operário Ferroviário | | | | 1–0 | | 1–0 | | 1–0 | | 1–0 | 2–0 | 1–1 | | 0–0 | 1–0 | | 1–0 | 1–1 | | |
| Paysandu | | | | 2–1 | | 0–2 | | 1–0 | | 2–1 | 1–0 | 4–2 | | | 2–1 | 1–0 | 1–1 | 1–1 | | |
| Pouso Alegre | | | | 0–1 | | 1–0 | 1–1 | | | 0–1 | 0–1 | 0–1 | | | | 0–2 | 0–2 | 1–2 | | |
| Remo | 3–1 | 1–2 | 0–0 | | 1–2 | | 1–0 | | 1–1 | | | | 1–2 | | | | | | 2–1 | 2–1 |
| São Bernardo | 1–1 | 2–1 | 0–0 | | 0–0 | | 3–1 | | 1–0 | | | | | | | 3–1 | | | 0–3 | 1–0 |
| São José | 4–1 | 1–0 | 2–0 | | | | 2–0 | | 3–3 | 0–0 | | | | | | 2–1 | 2–2 | | 2–2 | |
| Volta Redonda | 2–0 | 5–1 | 3–0 | | 1–0 | | | 1–1 | 2–0 | | | | 1–1 | 3–0 | 0–1 | | | | | 2–1 |
| Ypiranga | | | | 0–1 | 1–1 | 2–0 | | 1–1 | | | 2–0 | 3–3 | 0–2 | 5–0 | 4–1 | | | 1–0 | | |

Source: CBF
Legend: Blue = home team win; Yellow = draw; Red = away team win.

== Second stage ==
In the second stage, each group was played on a home-and-away round-robin basis. The teams were ranked according to points (3 points for a win, 1 point for a draw, and 0 points for a loss). If tied on points, the following criteria would be used to determine the ranking: 1. Wins; 2. Goal difference; 3. Goals scored; 4. Head-to-head (if the tie was only between two teams); 5. Fewest red cards; 6. Fewest yellow cards; 7. Draw in the headquarters of the Brazilian Football Confederation (Regulations Article 20).

The top two teams of each group were promoted to the Série B. Group winners advanced to the finals.

=== Group B ===
| Pos | Team | Pld | W | D | L | GF | GA | GD | Pts | Qualification |
|---|---|---|---|---|---|---|---|---|---|---|
| 1 | Brusque (P) | 6 | 4 | 1 | 1 | 9 | 7 | +2 | 13 | Advance to Finals and promoted to 2024 Série B |
| 2 | Operário Ferroviário (P) | 6 | 2 | 1 | 3 | 9 | 9 | 0 | 7 | Promoted to 2024 Série B |
| 3 | São Bernardo | 6 | 2 | 1 | 3 | 6 | 6 | 0 | 7 | |
| 4 | São José | 6 | 1 | 3 | 2 | 5 | 7 | −2 | 6 | |

Source: CBF
Rules for classification: 1) points; 2) wins; 3) goal difference; 4) goals scored; 5) head-to-head results (only between 2 teams); 6) fewest red cards; 7) fewest yellow cards; 8) draw.
(P) Promoted

==== Results ====
| Home \ Away | BRU | OPE | SBE | SJO |
|---|---|---|---|---|
| Brusque | | 4–3 | 1–0 | 0–0 |
| Operário Ferroviário | 1–2 | | 1–0 | 2–0 |
| São Bernardo | 2–0 | 2–1 | | 1–1 |
| São José | 1–2 | 1–1 | 2–1 | |

Source: CBF
Legend: Blue = home team win; Yellow = draw; Red = away team win.

=== Group C ===
| Pos | Team | Pld | W | D | L | GF | GA | GD | Pts | Qualification |
|---|---|---|---|---|---|---|---|---|---|---|
| 1 | Amazonas (P) | 6 | 4 | 0 | 2 | 9 | 4 | +5 | 12 | Advance to Finals and promoted to 2024 Série B |
| 2 | Paysandu (P) | 6 | 3 | 1 | 2 | 7 | 6 | +1 | 10 | Promoted to 2024 Série B |
| 3 | Volta Redonda | 6 | 3 | 1 | 2 | 6 | 7 | −1 | 10 | |
| 4 | Botafogo-PB | 6 | 1 | 0 | 5 | 6 | 11 | −5 | 3 | |

Source: CBF
Rules for classification: 1) points; 2) wins; 3) goal difference; 4) goals scored; 5) head-to-head results (only between 2 teams); 6) fewest red cards; 7) fewest yellow cards; 8) draw.
(P) Promoted

==== Results ====
| Home \ Away | AMA | BOT | PAY | VOL |
|---|---|---|---|---|
| Amazonas | | 2–0 | 0–1 | 2–0 |
| Botafogo-PB | 2–1 | | 2–3 | 1–2 |
| Paysandu | 1–2 | 1–0 | | 1–1 |
| Volta Redonda | 0–2 | 2–1 | 1–0 | |

Source: CBF
Legend: Blue = home team win; Yellow = draw; Red = away team win.

== Finals ==
The finals were played on a home-and-away two-legged basis, with the higher-seeded team hosting the second leg. If tied on aggregate, the away goals rule would not be used, extra time would not be played, and the penalty shoot-out would be used to determine the champions (Regulations Article 21).

The finalists were seeded according to their performance in the tournament. The teams were ranked according to overall points. If tied on overall points, the following criteria would be used to determine the ranking: 1. Overall wins; 2. Overall goal difference; 3. Draw in the headquarters of the Brazilian Football Confederation (Regulations Article 22).

| Pos | Team | Pld | W | D | L | GF | GA | GD | Pts | Host |
|---|---|---|---|---|---|---|---|---|---|---|
| 1 | (Santa Catarina (state)) Brusque | 25 | 13 | 5 | 7 | 34 | 21 | +13 | 44 | 2nd leg |
| 2 | (Amazonas (Brazilian state)) Amazonas | 25 | 13 | 5 | 7 | 32 | 24 | +8 | 44 | 1st leg |

Source: CBF

The matches were played on 15 and 22 October 2023.

| Team 1 | Agg. | Team 2 | 1st leg | 2nd leg |
|---|---|---|---|---|
| Amazonas (Amazonas (Brazilian state)) | 2–1 | (Santa Catarina (state)) Brusque | 0–0 | 2–1 |

=== Matches ===
15 October 2023
18:00

| Amazonas (Amazonas (Brazilian state)) | 0–0 | (Santa Catarina (state)) Brusque |
|---|---|---|
| | Report |

Arena da Amazônia, Manaus
Attendance: 23,923
Referee: Matheus Delgado Candançan (São Paulo)

| Amazonas | Brusque |

22 October 2023
17:00

| Brusque (Santa Catarina (state)) | 1–2 | (Amazonas (Brazilian state)) Amazonas |
|---|---|---|
| Guilherme Queiróz 11' (pen.) | Report | Torres 44'; Sassá 56' |

Estádio Augusto Bauer, Brusque
Attendance: 3,427
Referee: Edina Alves Batista (São Paulo)

| Brusque | Amazonas |

== Top goalscorers ==
| Rank | Player | Club | Goals |
|---|---|---|---|
| 1 | (Brazil) Sassá | Amazonas | 18 |
| 2 | (Brazil) Ítalo | Volta Redonda | 11 |
| 3 | (Brazil) Guilherme Queiróz | Brusque | 10 |
| 4 | (Brazil) Erick | Ypiranga | 9 |
| 4 | (Brazil) Mário Sérgio | Paysandu | 9 |
| 4 | (Brazil) Thayllon | São José | 9 |
| 7 | (Brazil) Felipe Augusto | Operário Ferroviário | 8 |
| 7 | (Brazil) Sillas | São José | 8 |
| 9 | (Brazil) Olávio | Brusque | 7 |

Source: CBF
