= Raul Cabral =

Brazilian football manager (born 1981)

Personal information
- Full name: Raul Maia Cabral
- Date of birth: 6 October 1981 (age 45)
- Place of birth: Tubarão, Brazil

Team information
- Current team: Figueirense (head coach)

Managerial career
- Years: Team
- 2005–2012: Figueirense (youth)
- 2013: Avaí U20
- 2014: Avaí (assistant)
- 2014: Avaí (interim)
- 2014: Grêmio U20
- 2015: Avaí (assistant)
- 2015: Avaí (interim)
- 2015–2016: Avaí
- 2016: Mirassol
- 2017: Tombense
- 2018: Concórdia
- 2018: Jataiense
- 2019: Mirassol U20
- 2020: Figueirense (assistant)
- 2020: Primavera
- 2021: Juventus de Jaraguá
- 2021: Luverdense
- 2021–2023: Hercílio Luz
- 2024–2025: Tombense
- 2025–2026: Ypiranga-RS
- 2026–: Figueirense

Raul Maia Cabral (born 6 October 1981) is a Brazilian football coach.

== Career ==
Born in Tubarão, Santa Catarina, Cabral started his career at Figueirense, being a manager of the club's youth sides. In July 2013 he moved to fierce rival Avaí, again assigned to the youth setup.

In 2014, Cabral was appointed assistant manager of the main squad. He was also named interim in two occasions: the first, as a replacement to Emerson Nunes in a 2–1 win against Figueirense, and the second in four matches after the dismissal of Pingo.

On 19 August 2014 Cabral was appointed at the helm of Grêmio's under-20 side. On 16 December, however, he returned to his previous club Avaí, again as an assistant.

Cabral was also an interim in 2015, but after a 1–2 loss against Marcílio Dias, he was replaced by Gilson Kleina. The latter was sacked on 10 November of that year, and Cabral was again named interim until the end of the year. He remained in charge until March 2016, being replaced by Silas.

On 15 June 2016, Cabral was named Mirassol manager. On 27 October, his departure to Tombense was confirmed, and he spent the 2017 campaign in charge of the club.

On 19 March 2018, Cabral was confirmed as head coach of Concórdia, and finished the season at Jataiense. He then returned to Mirassol in 2019, now in charge of the under-20 team, before being named coordinator of Figueirense's youth categories on 15 November of that year.

On 22 October 2020, after working as an assistant at Figueira, Cabral was appointed Primavera head coach. He was named in charge of Juventus de Jaraguá on 4 December, but was dismissed the following 5 March, after just three matches into the new season.

On 20 March 2021, Cabral was announced at Luverdense. Sacked on 5 May, he took over Hercílio Luz on 30 July.

On 30 November 2023, Cabral returned to Tombense in the place of Moacir Júnior. He was sacked on 13 July 2025, after more than a year in charge, and took over fellow league team Ypiranga-RS fifteen days later.

On 16 April 2026, Cabral left Ypiranga to return to his first club Figueirense, now as a first team head coach.
