= Maurício Souza =

Maurício Souza may refer to:

- Maurício Souza (footballer) (born 1974), Brazilian football manager and former footballer
- Maurício Souza (volleyball) (born 1988), Brazilian volleyball player

== Portuguese name ==
- Mauricio de Sousa (born 1935), Brazilian cartoonist and businessperson
