= Brayan Borges =

Brazilian former footballer

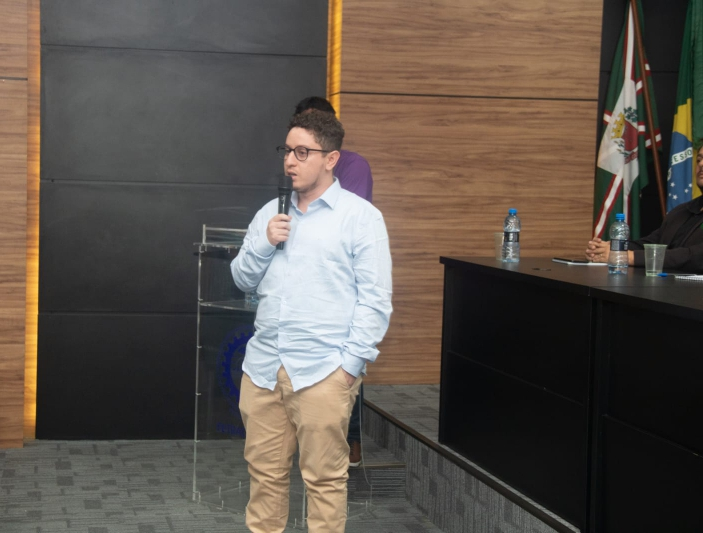

Personal information
- Full name: Brayan William Moreira Borges
- Date of birth: 5 February 1999 (age 27)
- Place of birth: Itapejara d'Oeste, Paraná, Brazil
- Height: 1.64 m (5 ft 5 in)
- Positions: Attacking midfielder; winger

Youth career
- 2014: Corinthians
- 2015: Brasilis
- 2016: FC Cascavel
- 2017–2018: Sport Club Campo Mourão

Senior career*
Years	Team	Apps	(Gls)
2018	Sport Club Campo Mourão	—	(—)
- * Club domestic league appearances and goals

Brayan William Moreira Borges (born 5 February 1999) is a Brazilian former footballer. He played primarily as an attacking midfielder and winger and developed in the youth systems of several Brazilian football clubs. After his football career, he became involved in social organizations and municipal politics in Paraná.

== Early life ==
Borges was born in Itapejara d'Oeste, Paraná, Brazil.

== Football career ==
=== Youth career ===
Borges began his football career in 2014 with the youth academy of Corinthians, playing at under-14 level. In 2015, he joined Brasilis, where he played in the under-15 category.

In 2016, Borges played for FC Cascavel at under-17 level, making 11 appearances and scoring four goals. In 2017, he joined Sport Club Campo Mourão, where he made five appearances and scored three goals for the under-18 team.

=== Senior career ===
In 2018, Borges progressed to Campo Mourão's under-20 squad and was included in the club's senior structure. Available football databases do not record an official senior appearance for him.

== Social activism ==
=== COVID-19 pandemic ===
During the COVID-19 pandemic, Borges participated in social mobilizations in Fazenda Rio Grande and the Curitiba metropolitan area. In 2021, he was associated with demonstrations calling for expanded vaccination, emergency financial assistance and measures addressing the social and economic effects of the pandemic.

In May 2021, Borges participated in a demonstration outside Fazenda Rio Grande City Hall in which more than 280 crosses were placed in memory of people who had died from COVID-19. The demonstration was reported by regional media as part of broader protests concerning the pandemic in Paraná.

== Political career ==
=== 2020 municipal election ===
In the 2020 municipal election, Borges was a candidate for the Fazenda Rio Grande City Council representing the Workers' Party (PT), under the ballot name "Brayan Borges".

=== 2024 vice-mayoral election ===
In the 2024 municipal election, Borges was the Green Party (PV) candidate for vice-mayor of Fazenda Rio Grande. He ran as the running mate of Workers' Party mayoral candidate Deborah Zanchi.

The election was held on 6 October 2024. The Zanchi–Borges ticket received 2,521 votes, or 4.31% of the valid votes, and finished third among four mayoral tickets.

Borges has also been mentioned in local reporting concerning political and electoral disputes in Paraná.
