= Juarez Leite =

Brazilian football manager

Personal information
- Full name: Juarez Sobreiro Leite
- Date of birth: 27 August 1963 (age 63)
- Place of birth: Borda da Mata, Brazil

Team information
- Current team: Brasilis U17 (head coach)

Managerial career
- Years: Team
- Brasilis (youth)
- 2007–2008: Brasilis
- 2009: Sendas (assistant)
- 2010: Fortaleza (assistant)
- 2011–2013: Guarani U20
- 2013: São Paulo U20 (assistant)
- 2015: União Barbarense (assistant)
- 2015–2016: Guarani U17
- 2016–2023: Brasilis U17
- 2017: Brasilis
- 2019–2020: Brasilis
- 2023: Pouso Alegre
- 2024–: Brasilis U17

Juarez Sobreiro Leite (born 27 August 1963) is a Brazilian football coach, currently the head coach of Brasilis' under-17 team.

== Career ==
Born in Borda da Mata, Minas Gerais, Leite worked in a football school in his hometown before beginning his career with the youth sides of Brasilis, being also in charge of the first team during the 2007 and 2008 Campeonato Paulista Segunda Divisão editions. In 2009, he worked as an assistant of Waguinho Dias at Sendas.

In 2010, Leite was Zé Teodoro's assistant at Fortaleza, before taking over the under-20 team of Guarani late in that year. In 2013, he was an assistant of Sérgio Baresi in the under-20 team of São Paulo.

Leite reunited with Dias in the 2015 campaign, being his assistant at União Barbarense. He later returned to Guarani, being in charge of their under-17 team, before rejoining Brasilis in 2016. At the latter club, he was also head coach of the first team on some occasions.

On 10 August 2023, Leite was announced at Série C side Pouso Alegre for the remaining two matches of the campaign.
