= Kendy =

Brazilian footballer

Personal information
- Full name: Kendy Tateishi Berbel
- Date of birth: 19 August 1997 (age 29)
- Place of birth: Dourados, Brazil
- Height: 1.85 m (6 ft 1 in)
- Position: Forward

Youth career
- 2014: Brasilis
- 2016–2017: Chapecoense

Senior career*
Years	Team	Apps	(Gls)
2017–2018	Chapecoense	4	(0)
2020–	Metropolitano	9	(1)
2021–	→ Azuriz Futebol (loan)	0	(0)
- * Club domestic league appearances and goals as of 20:31, 16 March 2021 (UTC)

Kendy Tateishi Berbel (born 19 August 1997), commonly known as Kendy or Japa, is a Brazilian footballer who currently plays as a forward.

== Career statistics ==
=== Club ===
As of 16 March 2021.

Club	Season	League			State League		Cup		Continental		Other		Total	
Club	Season	Division	Apps	Goals	Apps	Goals	Apps	Goals	Apps	Goals	Apps	Goals	Apps	Goals
Chapecoense	2017	Série A	0	0	0	0	0	0	0	0	1 (Note: Appearances in the Primeira Liga)	0	1	0
Chapecoense	2018	Série A	0	0	4 (Note: Appearances in the Campeonato Catarinense)	0	1 (Note: Appearances in the Copa do Brasil)	0	–		0	0	5	0
Chapecoense	Total		0	0	4	0	1	0	0	0	1	0	6	0
Metropolitano	2020	–			9 (Note: Appearances in the Campeonato Catarinense Divisão Especial)	1	0	0	–		0	0	9	1
Metropolitano	2021	–			0	0	0	0	–		0	0	0	0
Metropolitano	Total		0	0	9	1	0	0	0	0	0	0	9	1
Career total			0	0	13	1	1	0	0	0	1	0	15	1
