= List of Portuguese football transfers winter 2020–21 =

This is a list of Portuguese football transfers for the 2020–21 winter transfer window. The winter transfer window will open 1 January 2021, although a few transfers may take place prior to that date. The window closes at midnight on 1 February 2021 although outgoing transfers might still happen to leagues in which the window is still open. Only moves involving Primeira Liga clubs are listed. Additionally, players without a club may join a club at any time.

== Transfers ==
Date	Name	Moving from	Moving to	Fee
13 December 2020	(Brazil) Thiago Santana	Santa Clara	(Japan) Shimizu S-Pulse	€1M
30 December 2020	(Portugal) André Pinto	(Saudi Arabia) Al Fateh	Farense	Free
1 January 2021	(Moldova) Oleg Reabciuk	Paços de Ferreira	(Greece) Olympiacos	Undisclosed
2 January 2021	(Portugal) David Simão	(Greece) AEK Athens	Moreirense	Loan
4 January 2021	(Brazil) Lucas Veríssimo	(Brazil) Santos	Benfica	€6.5M
5 January 2021	(Portugal) Rúben Fonseca	Tondela	Salgueiros	Loan
5 January 2021	(Brazil) Rafael Martins	(China) Zhejiang Greentown	Moreirense	Free
5 January 2021	(Portugal) Rúben Vinagre	(England) Wolverhampton Wanderers	Famalicão	Loan
7 January 2021	(Senegal) Abdoulaye Ba	(Romania) Dinamo București	Moreirense	Free
7 January 2021	(Brazil) Ewerton	Porto	Portimonense	Loan
7 January 2021	(Portugal) Bruno Moreira	Rio Ave	Portimonense	Undisclosed
7 January 2021	(Japan) Hidemasa Morita	(Japan) Kawasaki Frontale	Santa Clara	Undisclosed
8 January 2021	(Portugal) Alexandre Guedes	Vitória de Guimarães	Famalicão	Undisclosed
8 January 2021	(Portugal) Rúben Lameiras	Famalicão	Vitória de Guimarães	Undisclosed
8 January 2021	(England) Dion McGhee	(England) Manchester United	Braga	Free
11 January 2021	(Brazil) Allano	Estoril Praia	Santa Clara	Undisclosed
11 January 2021	(Bulgaria) Bozhidar Kraev	(Denmark) Midtjylland	Famalicão	Loan
12 January 2021	(Japan) Kosuke Nakamura	(Japan) Kashiwa Reysol	Portimonense	Undisclosed
12 January 2021	(Portugal) Pedro Rebocho	(France) EA Guingamp	Paços Ferreira	Loan
12 January 2021	(Portugal) Heriberto Tavares	(France) Brest	Famalicão	Loan
15 January 2021	(Italy) Stefano Beltrame	(Bulgaria) CSKA Sofia	Marítimo	Free
15 January 2021	(Nigeria) Ahmed Isaiah	Gil Vicente	Varzim	Loan
15 January 2021	(Brazil) Marcelinho	Marítimo	Vizela	Loan
15 January 2021	(Portugal) Ivo Rodrigues	(Belgium) Antwerp	Famalicão	Undisclosed
15 January 2021	(Brazil) Lucas Piazon	(England) Chelsea	Braga	Undisclosed
16 January 2021	(Japan) Shoya Nakajima	Porto	(United Arab Emirates) Al Ain	Loan
17 January 2021	(Georgia (country)) Giorgi Arabidze	Nacional	(Russia) Rotor Volgograd	Loan
17 January 2021	(Spain) Roberto Olabe	(Spain) Eibar	Tondela	Loan
18 January 2021	(Mali) Abdoulay Diaby	Sporting CP	(Belgium) Anderlecht	Loan
18 January 2021	(Portugal) Tomás Tavares	Benfica	Farense	Loan
19 January 2021	(Honduras) Rubilio Castillo	Tondela	(Bolivia) Royal Pari	Loan
21 January 2021	(Portugal) Diogo Figueiras	Braga	Famalicão	Undisclosed
22 January 2021	(Croatia) Filip Krovinović	Benfica	(England) Nottingham Forest	Loan
23 January 2021	(Portugal) Pedrinho	(Latvia) Riga	Gil Vicente	Undisclosed
23 January 2021	(Iraq) Osama Rashid	Santa Clara	(Turkey) Gaziantep	Free
25 January 2021	(Portugal) André Mesquita	Santa Clara	Mafra	Loan
27 January 2021	(Portugal) Rúben Oliveira	Vitória de Guimarães B	Santa Clara	Undisclosed
28 January 2021	(Angola) Anderson Cruz	(Bolivia) Club Bolívar	Rio Ave	Undisclosed
30 January 2021	(Cyprus) Andreas Karo	(Italy) Lazio	Marítimo	Undisclosed
30 January 2021	(Canada) Stephen Eustáquio	(Mexico) Cruz Azul	Paços de Ferreira	€2.5m
30 January 2021	(Portugal) Pedro Martelo	Paços de Ferreira	(Spain) Badajoz	Loan
30 January 2021	(Portugal) Paulinho	(Greece) AEK Athens	Gil Vicente	Undisclosed
30 January 2021	(Brazil) Sassá	(Brazil) Cruzeiro	Marítimo	Loan
31 January 2021	(Portugal) Ferro	Benfica	(Spain) Valencia	Loan
31 January 2021	(Sweden) Tim Söderström	(Sweden) Hammarby	Marítimo	Undisclosed
1 February 2021	(Colombia) Cristian Borja	Sporting CP	Braga	Undisclosed
1 February 2021	(Portugal) Rui Costa	(Spain) Deportivo La Coruña	Santa Clara	Undisclosed
1 February 2021	(Portugal) Gedson Fernandes	Benfica	(Turkey) Galatasaray	Loan
1 February 2021	(Argentina) Facundo Ferreyra	Benfica	(Spain) Celta Vigo	Loan
1 February 2021	(Portugal) Tiago Ilori	Sporting CP	(France) Lorient	Loan
1 February 2021	(Serbia) Dejan Kerkez	Marítimo	Mafra	Loan
1 February 2021	(Portugal) Pedro Marques	Sporting CP	Gil Vicente	Loan
1 February 2021	(Portugal) João Mendes	Tondela	Estoril Praia	Loan
1 February 2021	(Portugal) Pedro Mendes	Sporting CP	Nacional	Loan
1 February 2021	(Portugal) Paulinho	Braga	Sporting CP	Undisclosed
1 February 2021	(France) Denis-Will Poha	Vitória de Guimarães	Portimonense	Loan
1 February 2021	(Brazil) Sávio	(Brazil) Ferroviária	Rio Ave	Undisclosed
1 February 2021	(Brazil) Guilherme Schettine	Braga	(Spain) Almería	Loan
1 February 2021	(South Korea) Lee Seung-woo	(Belgium) Sint-Truiden	Portimonense	Loan
1 February 2021	(Slovenia) Andraž Šporar	Sporting CP	Braga	Loan
2 February 2021	(Brazil) Júnior Brandão	(Bulgaria) Ludogorets Razgrad	Rio Ave	Loan
2 February 2021	(Portugal) Rafael Camacho	Sporting CP	Rio Ave	Loan
2 February 2021	(Portugal) Pêpê	(Greece) Olympiacos	Famalicão	Loan
2 February 2021	(Brazil) Matheus Reis	Rio Ave	Sporting CP	Loan
6 February 2021	(Japan) Keisuke Honda	(Brazil) Botafogo	Portimonense	Free
6 February 2021	(Peru) Gustavo Dulanto	Boavista	(Moldova) Sheriff Tiraspol	Free
8 February 2021	(Brazil) Ruan Teles	Marítimo	(Romania) Argeș Pitești	Undisclosed
12 February 2021	(Brazil) Bruno Viana	Braga	(Brazil) Flamengo	Loan
15 February 2021	(Portugal) Zé Gomes	Benfica	(Bulgaria) Cherno More	Undisclosed
9 March 2021	(Angola) Bruno Gaspar	Sporting CP	(United States) Vancouver Whitecaps	Loan
