= Aderval Barros =

Brazilian presenter

- Born: October 8, 1958 (age 66); Paulista, Pernambuco, (PE), Brazil
- Occupation(s): Radio host, TV presenter

Aderval Barros (born on October 8, 1958, Paulista, Pernambuco) is a Brazilian television presenter and radio announcer.

He currently hosts the Rede Bandeirantes Jogo Aberto program TV.

In 2015, the host of the Open Game broadcast on TV Tribuna (affiliated with Rede Bandeirantes) announced its entry into Radio Transamerica to present a sports program in the city of Recife.
