= Bruno Moraes (footballer, born 1984) =

Brazilian footballer

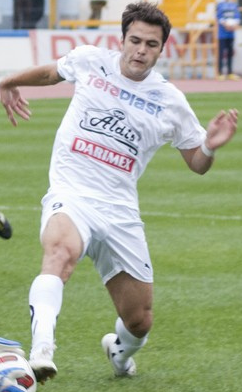
- Moraes in action for Gloria Bistriţa

Personal information
- Full name: Bruno dos Santos Moraes
- Date of birth: 7 July 1984 (age 42)
- Place of birth: Santos, Brazil
- Height: 1.80 m (5 ft 11 in)
- Position: Striker

Youth career
- 2001–2003: Santos

Senior career*
Years	Team	Apps	(Gls)
2002	Santos	2	(0)
2003–2004	Porto B	12	(11)
2003–2010	Porto	17	(2)
2004–2005	→ Vitória Setúbal (loan)	24	(5)
2008	→ Vitória Setúbal (loan)	3	(0)
2010	→ Rio Ave (loan)	8	(0)
2010	Gloria Bistriţa	12	(0)
2011	Naval	8	(3)
2011–2012	União Leiria	18	(6)
2012–2013	Újpest	9	(4)
2013	Újpest B	1	(1)
2013–2014	Gil Vicente	7	(2)
2014	Portuguesa	4	(0)
2015–2016	Varzim	23	(3)
2016–2017	Enosis Neon	9	(5)
2017–2018	Espinho	24	(10)
2018–2020	Trofense	39	(19)
2021–2022	Canidelo	20	(3)
Total		240	(74)
- * Club domestic league appearances and goals

Bruno dos Santos Moraes (born 7 July 1984) is a Brazilian former professional footballer who played as a striker.

He spent most of his career in Portugal, starting in 2003 with Porto.

== Career ==
Born in Santos, São Paulo, Moraes arrived at only 19 to FC Porto in Portugal, from Santos FC. His career with the former club would be marred by constant injuries – he made five Primeira Liga appearances in his debut season, and none whatsoever in 2005–06 and 2007–08.

Moraes' most productive season at Porto came in the 2006–07 campaign, as the Dragons won the national championship for the second year running. He appeared in 18 matches and scored three goals across the domestic league and the UEFA Champions League, notably taking part in both group-stage fixtures against Hamburger SV and netting in the second, a 3–1 away win 1 in November 2006.

Moraes spent 2004–05 on loan to Vitória de Setúbal, where he appeared regularly, and started 2008–09 on loan with the same team, but the second spell was soon cut short due to injury. In January 2010, with a contract running until June, he returned to Porto, trying to persuade manager Jesualdo Ferreira to add him to the squad of the four-time national champions; he did not and was loaned one more time, now to Rio Ave F.C. of the same league.

In mid-February 2011, Moraes signed for Associação Naval 1º de Maio also in Portugal. He featured regularly during his four-month spell in Figueira da Foz, but they could not finally avoid top-flight relegation. In July, after an aborted transfer to Al Ahly SC in Egypt, he joined another Portuguese top-tier side, U.D. Leiria, meeting the same fate at the end of the season.

On 8 October 2012, Moraes moved clubs and countries again, signing a one-year deal with Újpest FC in Hungary. In July 2015, after totalling only 11 games for Gil Vicente F.C. and Associação Portuguesa de Desportos, he joined Varzim S.C. of the Portuguese Segunda Liga.

== Personal life ==
Moraes' younger brother, Júnior Moraes, was also a footballer and a striker. He too represented Santos as a senior, as well as Gloria Bistriţa. Their father also played for that club as well as CR Flamengo, whilst a sister ended her career early on due to injury. Moraes' mother won the São Paulo State tennis championship.

== Honours ==
Porto

- Primeira Liga: 2003–04, 2006–07
- UEFA Champions League: 2003–04

Vitória Setúbal

- Taça de Portugal: 2004–05
