= Amaral (footballer, born 1978) =

Brazilian footballer

Personal information
- Full name: Anderson Conrado
- Date of birth: 4 April 1978 (age 48)
- Place of birth: Capivari, São Paulo, Brazil
- Height: 1.80 m (5 ft 11 in)
- Position: Defender

Senior career*
Years	Team	Apps	(Gls)
–	Grémio Mauaense		
–	Palestra		
2002	São Raimundo		
–	Paraguaçuense		
–	Grêmio Inhumense		
2003–2004	Leixões	32	(5)
2004–2008	Belenenses	91	(2)
- * Club domestic league appearances and goals as of 1 July 2008

Anderson Conrado also known as Amaral (born 4 April 1978) is a Brazilian footballer who played as a defender in the Portuguese Primeira Liga with C.F. Os Belenenses.

== Career ==
Born in Capivari, São Paulo, Amaral began playing football with local side Grémio Mauaense in the lower levels of the Campeonato Paulista. At the time, his teammates gave him the nickname Amaral because he had similar attributes to former midfielder Amaral. He would play for Palestra, São Raimundo (Manaus), Paraguaçuense and Grêmio Inhumense before moving to Portugal in 2003. Amaral made his debut in the Campeonato Brasileiro Série B with São Raimundo during 2002, and he scored a goal against Fortaleza in the 12th round.

Amaral made a good impression in his first season in the Liga de Honra with Leixões, leading to a contract offer from Primeira Liga side Belenenses before the next season.
