= Thiago Carvalho =

Brazilian footballer (born 1988)

Personal information
- Full name: Thiago Carvalho de Oliveria
- Date of birth: 24 June 1988 (age 38)
- Place of birth: Rio Verde, Brazil
- Height: 1.87 m (6 ft 2 in)
- Position: Centre back

Team information
- Current team: Juventus-SP (head coach)

Youth career
- Vila Nova

Senior career*
Years	Team	Apps	(Gls)
2006–2010	Vila Nova	46	(5)
2006	→ Jataiense (loan)		
2008	→ Trindade (loan)	4	(0)
2011	América-SP	14	(2)
2011	Boa Esporte	28	(3)
2012–2016	Cruzeiro	22	(0)
2013–2015	→ Boa Esporte (loan)	70	(4)
2015–2016	→ Ceará (loan)	18	(1)
2017–2018	Aparecidense	23	(1)

Managerial career
- 2020: Aparecidense (assistant)
- 2020–2022: Aparecidense
- 2022–2023: Caxias
- 2023: América de Natal
- 2024: Ypiranga-RS
- 2024: Vila Nova
- 2025: Figueirense
- 2026–: Juventus-SP
- * Club domestic league appearances and goals

Thiago Carvalho de Oliveira (born 24 June 1988), known as Thiago Carvalho, is a Brazilian football coach and former player who played as a central defender. He is the current head coach of Juventus-SP.

== Playing career ==
Born in Rio Verde, Goiás, Carvalho was a youth product of Vila Nova, but made his senior debut while on loan at Jataiense in 2006. He only started to feature with the main squad of Vila in the 2008 season, after another loan spell at Trindade.

A regular starter in the 2009 season, Carvalho subsequently lost his starting spot and moved to América-SP for the 2011 campaign. On 1 November of that year, after being a regular starter for Boa Esporte, he joined Série A side Cruzeiro.

Carvalho made his top tier debut on 29 July 2012, starting in a 2–1 home win over Palmeiras. The following 23 January, he renewed his contract until 2016, but returned to his former club Boa on loan on 20 August 2013.

On 12 August 2015, Carvalho joined Ceará on loan until the end of the year. In 2017, he moved to Aparecidense after his contract with Cruzeiro expired, and retired with the club in the end of the 2018 season, aged 30.

== Coaching career ==
After retiring, Carvalho became an assistant coach of his last club Aparecidense in 2020. In September of that year, he became the club's head coach, and led them to a first-ever promotion to the Série C in 2021, as champions.

Carvalho was sacked by the Camaleão on 7 March 2022, and was named head coach of Caxias on 18 May. He left the latter on 13 April 2023, after accepting an offer from América de Natal, but was sacked on 10 July.

On 5 February 2024, Carvalho was appointed at the helm of Ypiranga-RS. He resigned on 20 October to return to his first club Vila Nova, now as head coach.

On 25 November 2024, Carvalho was announced as head coach of Figueirense. He was dismissed the following 28 April, after a poor start of the 2025 Série C.

On 1 December 2025, Carvalho was named Juventus-SP head coach for the upcoming season.

== Coaching statistics ==
As of match played 22 September 2026

Coaching record by team and tenure
Team	From	To	Record								Ref
Team	From	To	G	W	D	L	GF	GA	GD	Win %	Ref
Aparecidense	19 October 2020	6 March 2022	73	36	20	17	117	61	+56	49.32	
Caxias	21 May 2022	8 April 2023	29	11	14	4	40	27	+13	37.93	
América de Natal	3 May 2023	9 July 2023	14	4	4	6	9	15	−6	28.57	
Ypiranga-RS	13 March 2024	16 October 2024	41	16	13	12	48	41	+7	39.02	
Vila Nova	22 October 2024	25 November 2024	6	2	0	4	7	13	−6	33.33	
Figueirense	28 November 2024	28 April 2025	15	4	5	6	24	22	+2	26.67	
Juventus-SP	11 January 2026	present	33	15	9	9	45	33	+12	45.45	
Total			211	88	65	58	290	212	+78	41.71	—

== Honours ==
Aparecidense

- Campeonato Brasileiro Série D: 2021

América de Natal

- Campeonato Potiguar: 2023

Juventus-SP

- Campeonato Paulista Série A2: 2026

Individual

- Campeonato Paulista Série A2 Best Head Coach: 2026
