= Luciano Fonseca =

Brazilian footballer

Personal information
- Full name: Luciano Perazzolo Simonetto Fonseca
- Date of birth: May 11, 1979 (age 47)
- Place of birth: Caxias do Sul, Brazil
- Height: 1.70 m (5 ft 7 in)
- Position: Attacking midfielder

Youth career
- 1998: Juventude

Senior career*
Years	Team	Apps	(Gls)
1999–2001	Juventude	32	(0)
2002	Goiás		
2002	Juventude		
2003	Gama	17	(5)
2004–2006	Académica	58	(7)
2006–2007	Nacional	11	(1)
2007	Caxias		
2007	Grêmio	4	(0)
2008	Iraklis	8	(3)
2009	Anagennisi Karditsas		
2009	São José		
2010	São Luiz		
2010	Botafogo-PB		
2010	Hà Nội T&T		
2011	Santo André		
2011–?	Esportivo		
- * Club domestic league appearances and goals

Luciano Perazzolo Simonetto Fonseca (born May 11, 1979), or simply Luciano Fonseca, is a Brazilian former professional footballer who played as an attacking midfielder.
