= Red Bull Bragantino II =

- Full name: Red Bull Bragantino II
- Nickname: Toro Loko
- Founded: 19 November 2007 as Red Bull Brazil
- Dissolved: 6 November 2024; 2 years ago
- Ground: Nabi Abi Chedid
- Owner: Red Bull GmbH
- Chairman: Pedro Francisco Navio
- League: Licensed
- Website: www.redbullbrasil.com.br
Home colours	Away colours

Red Bull Bragantino II was a professional association football club based in Bragança Paulista, São Paulo, Brazil. The team last played in the Campeonato Paulista Série A3, the third tier of the São Paulo state football league, before requesting their leave from the competition in 2024. It operated as Red Bull Bragantino's reserve team, and played in the Campeonato Brasileiro de Aspirantes under the Red Bull Bragantino name.

Founded on 19 November 2007 as Red Bull Brasil, the club was owned by Red Bull GmbH. Due to the team's failure to reach the Série A, Red Bull instead partnered with Clube Atlético Bragantino, an existing club. They opted to withdraw from the São Paulo football league for two years in November 2024, effectively disbanding.

== History ==
Logo of Red Bull Brasil

In 2009, RB Brazil won the Campeonato Paulista Segunda Divisão, the fourth tier of the São Paulo state professional football championship in its second season. In 2010 the team gained their next promotion after winning the Campeonato Paulista Série A3 2010 season. In 2010 the team reached the final of the Copa Paulista, the São Paulo state cup tournament in its first year of eligibility in that competition.

The 2011 season turned out unsuccessful for RB Brasil. They ended the league's first phase with an 8-4-6 win-draw-loss record, resulting in a fifth place finish and thus failing to move to phase 2 by 4 points. 2012 was much more successful for the club. They finished in 3rd in the regular season in Campeonato Paulista Série A2 but were then knocked out in the semi-final stage, finishing 3rd in their group.

The team was the 2014 Campeonato Paulista Série A2 runner-up and was promoted to the Campeonato Paulista Série A1. In 2015, the team reached the quarter-finals, where they lost to São Paulo. With a 6th place finish, the team qualified to the Campeonato Brasileiro Série D, where they did not advance to playoffs.

In 2016, the team again reached quarter-finals of the Campeonato Paulista Série A1, then lost to Corinthians. The team qualified to the Copa do Brasil, losing in first round to América Mineiro.

On 26 March 2019, Bragantino's president announced a partnership deal with Red Bull Brasil.

On 16 January 2023, Red Bull Brasil changed its name to Red Bull Bragantino II, becoming the B team of Red Bull Bragantino.

On 6 November 2024, the club announced its withdrawal from São Paulo Football Federation competitions, citing problems regarding inefficiency in the transfer of athletes between the club and the main team.

== Head coaches ==
- (Brazil) Paulo Sérgio (2008)
- (Brazil) Ricardo Pinto (2008–2009)
- (Brazil) José Luis Fernandes (2009)
- (Brazil) Jair Picerni (2009)
- (Brazil) Márcio Fernandes (2010–2011)
- (Brazil) Luciano Dias (2011–12)
- (Brazil) Argel Fuchs (2012–13)
- (Brazil) Mauricio Barbieri (2014–2016)
- (Brazil) Alberto Valentim (2017)
- (Brazil) Silas Pereira (2017)
- (Brazil) Ricardo Catalá (2017–2018)
- (Brazil) Antônio Carlos Zago (2018–2019)
- (Brazil) Vinicius Munhoz (2020–2022)
- (Brazil) Fábio Matias (2023)
- (Brazil) Juninho (caretaker; 2024)
- (Brazil) Fernando Seabra (2024)
- (Brazil) Maurício Souza (2024)

== Season results ==
- 2008: Campeonato Paulista Segunda Divisão (Tier IV - State Level)

reached 3rd Phase (5th to 8th place)

- 2009: Campeonato Paulista Segunda Divisão (Tier IV - State Level)

Champion

- 2010: Campeonato Paulista Série A3 (Tier III - State Level)

Champion

- 2011: Campeonato Paulista Série A2 (Tier II - State Level)

eliminated 1st Phase

- 2012: Campeonato Paulista Série A2 (Tier II - State Level)

eliminated 2nd Phase (5th to 8th place)

- 2013: Campeonato Paulista Série A2 (Tier II - State Level)

eliminated 2nd Phase (5th to 8th place)

- 2014: Campeonato Paulista Série A2 (Tier II - State Level)

runner-up. Promoted to Campeonato Paulista

- 2015:
  - Campeonato Paulista (Tier I - State Level)
    eliminated Quarter-finals (6th place)
  - Campeonato Brasileiro Série D (Tier IV - National Level)
    eliminated 1st Phase (4th in Group A7 - 26th overall)
- 2016:
  - Campeonato Paulista (Tier I - State Level)
    eliminated Quarter-finals (7th place)
  - Copa do Brasil
    eliminated in 1st round
- 2017:
  - Campeonato Paulista (Tier I - State Level)
    eliminated in 1st Phase (13th Place)
  - Campeonato Brasileiro Série D (Tier IV - National Level)
    eliminated in Group stage (3rd in Group A14 - 44th overall)
- 2018:
  - Campeonato Paulista (Tier I - State Level)
    eliminated in 1st Phase (12th Place)
- 2019:
  - Campeonato Paulista (Tier I - State Level)
    eliminated in Quarter-finals (5th Place)

== Honours ==
- Campeonato Paulista Série A3
  - Winners (1): 2010
- Campeonato Paulista Série A4
  - Winners (1): 2009
- Campeonato Paulista do Interior
  - Winners (1): 2019

== See also ==
- Red Bull Bragantino
