= Luizinho Vieira =

Brazilian football manager and former player

Personal information
- Full name: Luiz Henrique Vieira
- Date of birth: 4 February 1972 (age 54)
- Place of birth: Criciúma, Brazil
- Height: 1.73 m (5 ft 8 in)
- Position: Attacking midfielder

Youth career
- Criciúma

Senior career*
| Years | Team | Apps | (Gls) |
| 1992–1994 | Criciúma | 16 | (2) |
| 1995–1997 | Brasil de Pelotas | | |
| 1997–1999 | Atlético Paranaense | | (12) |
| 1998 | → Shandong Luneng (loan) | 6 | (0) |
| 1999 | Gamba Osaka | 15 | (6) |
| 2000 | Atlético Paranaense | | (0) |
| 2000 | Brasil de Pelotas | | |
| 2001 | Inter de Limeira | 15 | (2) |
| 2001 | Santa Cruz | 27 | (12) |
| 2002 | Al-Ittihad | 8 | (4) |
| 2002–2003 | Marília | | (6) |
| 2003 | → Ponte Preta (loan) | | (3) |
| 2004 | Atlético Sorocaba | 4 | (1) |
| 2005 | 15 de Novembro | 14 | (3) |
| 2005 | ABC | | |
| 2006 | Joinville | | |
| 2006 | Ceilândia | 3 | (0) |
| 2007 | Próspera | | |
| 2008 | Oeste | 16 | (3) |

Managerial career
- 2010: Novo Hamburgo (assistant)
- 2011: Farroupilha
- 2011: Botafogo-SP U20
- 2011: Botafogo-SP
- 2011–2012: Brasil de Pelotas
- 2013: Farroupilha
- 2013–2014: Criciúma U20
- 2014: Criciúma (interim)
- 2014: Criciúma (interim)
- 2015: Criciúma
- 2015–2016: Criciúma (assistant)
- 2015: Criciúma (interim)
- 2017–2018: Itumbiara
- 2018: Luverdense
- 2019: Sergipe
- 2020: Volta Redonda
- 2021: Manaus
- 2021: Retrô
- 2021: Passo Fundo
- 2022–2023: Ypiranga-RS
- 2023: Confiança
- 2023–2024: Amazonas
- 2024: Brusque
- 2025: Caxias
- 2025–2026: Confiança
- * Club domestic league appearances and goals

Luiz Henrique Vieira (born 4 February 1972), known as Luizinho Vieira, is a Brazilian football coach and former player who played as an attacking midfielder.

== Playing career ==
Vieira was born in Criciúma, Santa Catarina, and was a youth product of hometown side Criciúma EC, making his first team debut in 1992. After being rarely used, he moved to Brasil de Pelotas in 1995, where he started to score in a regular basis.

In 1997, Vieira signed for Atlético Paranaense, but was loaned to Chinese club Shandong Luneng in the following year. He joined Japanese J1 League club Gamba Osaka in summer 1999, making his debut for the club on 7 August in a match against Verdy Kawasaki. He played all 15 matches as midfielder and scored 6 goals in 2nd stage.

After leaving Gamba end of 1999 season, Vieira returned to Furacão, but ended the 2000 campaign back at Brasil de Pelotas. In May 2001, after a brief spell at Inter de Limeira, he moved to Santa Cruz along with teammate Pintado, and was their top scorer in the 2001 Série A with 12 goals.

In 2002, Vieira moved to Saudi club Al-Ittihad, but returned to Marília and helped in their promotion from the Série C with six goals. He was later loaned out to Ponte Preta, and was in the squad of Atlético Sorocaba during the 2004 Campeonato Paulista.

Vieira was a part of the 15 de Novembro squad which finished second in the 2005 Campeonato Gaúcho, scoring in the second leg of the final against Internacional. He later had brief spells at ABC, Joinville, Ceilândia, Próspera and Oeste before retiring with the latter in 2008, aged 36.

== Coaching career ==
After retiring, Vieira worked as an assistant of Leandro Machado at Novo Hamburgo in 2010, before being named head coach of Farroupilha in March 2011. In August, he moved to Botafogo-SP; initially an under-20 coach, he was appointed at the helm of the main squad in September, but just led the side for one match after accepting an offer from his former club Brasil de Pelotas.

Sacked by Brasil on 23 April 2012, Vieira subsequently returned to Farroupilha in the following year before taking over the under-20 team of Criciúma in September 2013. The following February, he was named interim head coach of the latter's main squad, replacing sacked Ricardo Drubscky.

Vieira returned to his previous role after the appointment of Caio Júnior on 27 February 2014, but was again named interim on 20 November, in the place of Toninho Cecílio. Despite being unable to avoid relegation in the Série A, he was permanently appointed the Criciúma's head coach for the 2015 campaign on 18 December.

In April 2015, Vieira was demoted to the assistant role of Tigre, after the arrival of Moacir Júnior as head coach, but was again an interim in October, after Dejan Petković was dismissed. He left the club in the end of 2016, after being named Itumbiara head coach.

Vieira left Itumbiara on 6 February 2018, and took over Luverdense on 2 April. He was sacked from the latter on 16 July, as they were battling relegation in the 2018 Série C.

Vieira was announced as head coach of Sergipe on 27 October 2018, but only lasted four matches before being relieved of his duties on 23 January of the following year. He agreed to become Volta Redonda's head coach on 16 October 2019, but resigned roughly one year later.

On 29 January 2021, Vieira took over Manaus also in the third division, but was sacked on 9 March, after 12 matches. He was named Retrô head coach on 29 April, but was dismissed on 31 August.

Vieira was named at the helm of Passo Fundo on 14 September 2021, but left the club on 25 November to take over Ypiranga-RS. Sacked by the latter on 11 July 2023, he took over fellow third-level side Confiança six days later, but left the latter on 11 September to take over Amazonas in the same division.

Vieira led Amazonas to their first-ever promotion to the second division as champions, but was sacked on 16 April 2024. On 20 May, he replaced Luizinho Lopes as Brusque head coach, but was also dismissed on 8 September.

On 24 September 2024, Vieira agreed to take over Caxias for the 2025 season. The following 22 April, after 14 matches, he was sacked, and returned to Confiança six days later.

On 2 February 2026, Vieira was dismissed from Confiança.

== Career statistics ==
Appearances and goals by club, season and competition
| Club | Season | League | | | Emperor's Cup | | J.League Cup | | Total | |
| Club | Season | Division | Apps | Goals | Apps | Goals | Apps | Goals | Apps | Goals |
|---|---|---|---|---|---|---|---|---|---|---|
| Gamba Osaka | 1999 | J1 League | 15 | 6 | 2 | 0 | 0 | 0 | 17 | 6 |
| Career total | | | 15 | 6 | 2 | 0 | 0 | 0 | 17 | 6 |

== Honours ==
=== Player ===
Criciúma

- Campeonato Catarinense: 1993

Atlético Paranaense

- Campeonato Paranaense: 1998, 2000

=== Coach ===
Amazonas

- Campeonato Brasileiro Série C: 2023
