= Paulista =

Municipality of Pernambuco, Brazil

- Municipality
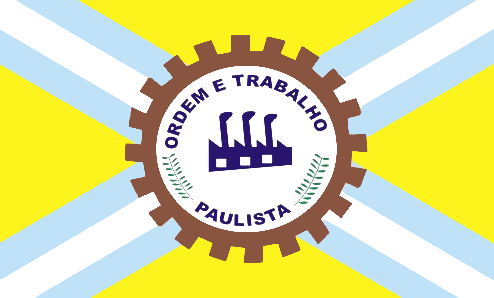
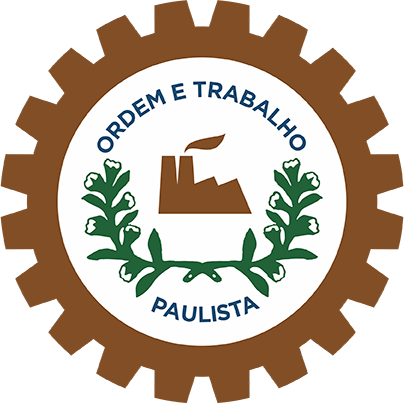
- Flag Coat of arms
- Nicknames: "Cidade das Chaminés"("City of Smokestacks"), "Capital dos Eucaliptos"("Capital of Eucalyptus")

- Location in Brazil
- Coordinates: 7°56′27″S 34°52′22″W
- Country: Brazil
- Region: Northeast
- State: Pernambuco
- Established: 1935

Government
  - Mayor: Yves Ribeiro (MDB, 2021-2024)

Area
  - Total: 93.518 km^{2} (36.108 sq mi)
- Elevation: 13 m (43 ft)

Population (2022 Brazilian census)
  - Total: 342,167
  - Estimate (2025): 365,144
  - Density: 3,658.8/km^{2} (9,476.3/sq mi)
- Time zone: UTC−3 (BRT)
- Demonym: paulistense

Paulista (Recifense portuguese pronunciation: [pɐwˈliʃtɐ]) is a municipality in Pernambuco, Brazil, with a population of 365,144 as of 2025. It has the highest Human Development Index (HDI) of the Recife metropolitan area. It is the birthplace of footballer Rivaldo and is also famous for its beaches, including Maria Farinha with the giant Veneza water park. It was incorporated as a city in 1935.

== History ==
In 1535 Paulista was a village, with two parishes, Paratibe and Maranguape, and formed part of the then village of Olinda. In the mid-16th century, the lands of Paratibe were donated by Coelho to Jerônimo de Albuquerque, services rendered to the Dubuquerque colony. Jerônimo de Albuquerque, after a while, ceded the lands of Paratibe to Gonçalo Mendes Leitão, at the time of marrying his daughter. Later, with the death of Mendes Leitão, his heirs sold them as properties, dividing from then on into Paratibe de Cima and Paratibe de Baixo (Upper Paratibe and Lower Paratibe). In 1856, the parish of Maranguape was acquired by João Fernandes Vieira and at the end of this century, in the year 1689, the two parishes, Paratibe and Maranguape, were sold to the pioneer of São Paulo, Manoel Álvares de Morais Navarro, known as "Paulista", giving rise to the current name of the city.

The later centuries were characterized by both political and economic growth for the city. Paulista was the second district of Olinda until 1935, which became an independent municipality and is currently formed by the districts of Paratibe, Arthur Lundgren I, Arthur Lundgren II, Jardim Paulista Baixo, Jardim Paulista Alto, Conceição, Janga, Pau Amarelo, Nobre, Maranguape I, Maranguape II, Jardim Maranguape, Alameda Paulista, Maria Farinha, Engenho Maranguape and Mirueira.

== Anthem ==
It was made by Joel Andrade.

Portuguese Lyrics	English Lyrics
O antigo Engenho de Manuel Navarro Cresceu e para o mundo despontou É hoje palco de um progresso imensurável Paulista, símbolo da graça e do labor! Em teu rico solo, o choro é riso Doce paraíso encantador Onde os dias têm mais luz Onde as estrelas têm mais fulgor Em cima, o céu é mais azul, é mais bonito Em baixo, a brisa tem aroma de eucalipto Teu povo é mais ordeiro e mais gentil Paulista, fração linda do Brasil (BIS) Qual grande lençol verde se agitando Teu mar faz do teu leste atração Enquanto o Sol que é bem mais Sol sobre teu solo Esquenta o ar, esquenta a vida esquenta o chão És o apogeu de um sonho lindo Esplendor de um dia de verão Onde a paz reside em paz Onde as roseiras bem mais rosas dão Em cima, o céu é mais azul e mais bonito Embaixo, a brisa tem aroma de eucalipto Teu povo é mais ordeiro e mais gentil Paulista, fração linda do Brasil!	The old Mill of Manuel Navaro Grew and for the world it emerged Is today an immeasurable progress stage Paulista, symbol of grace and labor! In your rich soil, the cry is laughter Sweet charming paradise Where the days have more light Where the stars have more shine Above, the sky is bluer, is more beautiful Below, the wind has a eucalyptus scent Your people are more orderly and kinder Paulista, beautiful fraction of Brazil (BIS) Which big green sheet shaking Your east makes your sea attractive While the sun is way more sun in your soil Heat the air, heat the life heat the ground Are the height of a beautiful dream The splendor of a summer day Where peace resides in peace Where the rose bushes way more roses give Above, the sky is bluer, is more beautiful Below, the wind has a eucalyptus scent Your people are more orderly and kinder Paulista, beautiful fraction of Brazil

== Beaches ==
- Conceição Beach - At 2 km (1.2 mi) long with many coconut trees, this beach has calm and very deep water. Also has many bars and tents.
- Janga Beach - an urban beach with artificial reefs
- Maria Farinha Beach - features quiet and shallow waters. At low tide, it is possible to see the reefs, and at this time, the beach has almost no waves.
- Pau Amarelo Beach - features quiet water and a formation of sand banks, which give rise to small sandbar islets and natural pools.

The beaches of Paulista are a nesting ground for endangered hawksbill sea turtles.

== Economy ==
In the municipality of Paulista, activities related to services, commerce and industry predominate. Tourism is also responsible for attracting enterprises to the municipality with the implementation of hotels, restaurants, commercial points, and marinas. In Paulista, the industrial park of Paratibe is also located, which houses companies from different sectors, stimulating the region's economy and generating employment for the population.

The municipality is part of the Metropolitan Region of Recife, which polarizes economic flows, with a predominance of the service sector and functions as a distribution center for goods. In addition to concentrating a greater number of processing industries in the State, another pillar of the metropolitan economy is the agro-industry, focused on the alcohol and sugar sectors. Also noteworthy is the cultivation of fruits and vegetables, such as bananas, coconuts, yams, manioc, among others.

=== Economic Indicators ===
Population	GDP x(1000 R$).	GDP pc (R$)	PE (%)	RMR (%)
319,373	1,367,111	4,449	2.19	3.37

Economy by Sector

Primary sector	Secondary sector	Service sector
0.42%	23.29%	76.29%

=== Health Indicators ===
HDI (2000)	Hospitals (2007)	Hospitals beds (2007)	Children's Mortality every 1000 (2005)
0.799	4	480	12.6

== Notable people ==
- Jamesson Andrade de Brito, footballer

== See also ==
- List of municipalities in Pernambuco
