= Vinicius Munhoz =

Brazilian football manager (born 1978)

Personal information
- Full name: Vinicius da Cunha Munhoz
- Date of birth: 11 December 1978 (age 47)
- Place of birth: Santa Maria, Brazil

Team information
- Current team: Paulista (head coach)

Managerial career
- Years: Team
- 2005–2008: Brazil U20 (women) (assistant)
- 2009: Saint Louis Athletica (assistant)
- 2013: Osasco U20
- 2014: Grêmio Osasco U20
- 2014–2015: Grêmio Osasco
- 2015: Audax
- 2016: Mirassol U20
- 2016: Audax
- 2017–2018: Inter-SM
- 2018–2019: Ferroviária
- 2020–2022: Red Bull Brasil
- 2020: Red Bull Bragantino (interim)
- 2022–2023: Ferroviária
- 2024: Villa Nova
- 2024: Mirassol U20
- 2025: Ituano
- 2025: Goiânia
- 2026–: Paulista

Vinicius da Cunha Munhoz (born 11 December 1978) is a Brazilian football coach, currently the head coach of Paulista.

== Career ==
Born in Santa Maria, Rio Grande do Sul, Munhoz started his career in 1999 as a fitness coach of Internacional de Santa Maria's under-20 squad. He later worked in the same role with the main squad before joining Grêmio in 2003, again as fitness coach.

In 2005, Munhoz was hired by the Brazilian Football Confederation to work as a fitness coach and assistant of Jorge Barcellos at the women's under-20 national team. Between 2007 and 2008 he worked at Esportivo as a fitness coach before rejoining Barcelos' staff at the women's national team for the 2008 Summer Olympics.

In 2009, Munhoz followed Barcelos to Saint Louis Athletica in Women's Professional Soccer, being later a technical coordinator at Fragata Futebol Clube. In 2013, after a stint back at Grêmio's under-20 squad as a fitness coach, he joined Audax's subsidiary teams: starting with Osasco FC's under-20s, he later managed Grêmio Osasco's under-20 and senior squads in 2014 before taking over Audax's first team in 2015.

Dismissed by Audax in late 2015, Munhoz was appointed in charge of Mirassol's under-20 squad for the 2016 campaign. After reaching the round of 32 of the year's Copa São Paulo de Futebol Júnior, he returned to Audax, being in charge of the club during the year's Série D.

On 1 November 2016, Munhoz returned to his first club Inter-SM, now named first team head coach. He renewed his contract the following 1 July, but resigned on 15 June 2018 after accepting an offer from Ferroviária.

In December 2019, after Ferroviária's change of ownership, Munhoz was offered a board role, but opted to leave the club and joined Red Bull Brasil. The following 2 January, after Antônio Carlos Zago left to Kashima Antlers, Munhoz was named interim head coach of Red Bull Bragantino.

Munhoz returned to RB Brasil after the appointment of Felipe Conceição, before agreeing to return to Ferroviária on 24 May 2022. Sacked on 26 January 2023 after three consecutive defeats, he spent nearly the entire year without a club before taking over Villa Nova on 6 December.

Munhoz joined Mirassol in September 2024, to coach their under-20 team, before being announced as head coach of Ituano on 18 December. He was dismissed from the latter on 13 February 2025, after nine matches.
