= Emerson Nunes =

Brazilian footballer (born 1981)

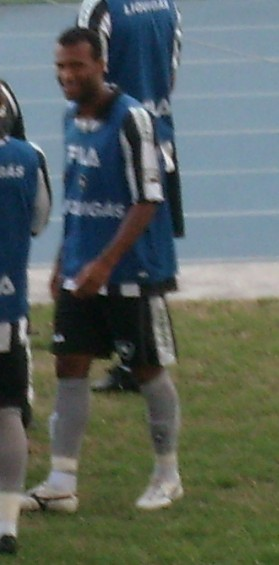

Personal information
- Full name: Emerson Pereira Nunes
- Date of birth: 21 March 1982 (age 44)
- Place of birth: Belo Horizonte, Brazil
- Height: 1.79 m (5 ft 10 in)
- Position: Central defender

Team information
- Current team: Chapecoense (assistant)

Senior career*
Years	Team	Apps	(Gls)
2000–2007	Cruzeiro	20	(0)
2002	→ Sergipe (loan)		
2003	→ América Mineiro (loan)		
2003–2007	→ Nacional (loan)	47	(1)
2008	→ Ipatinga (loan)		
2009	Botafogo	24	(0)
2010–2011	Avaí	22	(0)

Managerial career
- 2012–2013: Avaí (assistant)
- 2013: Avaí (interim)
- 2014: Avaí
- 2015: Avaí U17
- 2018: Vila Nova (assistant)
- 2019: Figueirense (assistant)
- 2019: Botafogo-SP (assistant)
- 2020: Chapecoense (assistant)
- 2020: Brasil de Pelotas (assistant)
- 2021: Criciúma (assistant)
- 2021: Vila Nova (assistant)
- 2022: Joinville (assistant)
- 2022: Sport Recife (assistant)
- 2022: Chapecoense (assistant)
- 2023: Ituano (assistant)
- 2024: Desportiva Ferroviária
- 2024–: Chapecoense (assistant)
- * Club domestic league appearances and goals

Emerson Pereira Nunes (born 21 March 1981 in Belo Horizonte), sometimes known as just Emerson, is a Brazilian football coach and former player who played as a central defender. He is the current assistant coach of Chapecoense.

== Honours ==
Botafogo

- Taça Guanabara: 2009

Avaí

- Campeonato Catarinense: 2010
