= Marcelinho (footballer, born 1996) =

Brazilian footballer

Personal information
- Full name: Marcelo Antônio de Oliveira
- Date of birth: July 17, 1996 (age 30)
- Place of birth: Cascavel, Brazil
- Height: 1.76 m (5 ft 9 in)
- Position: Winger

Team information
- Current team: Ypiranga
- Number: 80

Senior career*
Years	Team	Apps	(Gls)
2015–2016	Foz do Iguaçu	16	(1)
2016–2019	Londrina	39	(4)
2017	→ Linense (loan)	1	(0)
2017	→ Shukura (loan)	17	(4)
2019–2021	Marítimo	18	(1)
2020	→ Londrina (loan)	9	(3)
2021	→ Vizela (loan)	3	(0)
2021–2022	Londrina	28	(4)
2022	Paysandu	11	(1)
2023–	Camboriú	4	(0)
2023–	Galo Maringá	10	(1)
2023–	Ferroviário	23	(6)
2023–	Guarani	4	(0)
2023–	Aymorés	7	(0)
2023–	CSA	11	(1)
2023–	Ypiranga	21	(0)
- * Club domestic league appearances and goals as of 10 November 2026

Marcelo Antônio de Oliveira (born 17 July 1996 in Cascavel), known as Marcelinho, is a Brazilian professional footballer who plays for Ypiranga as a winger.

== Football career ==
Marcelinho began playing football with Foz do Iguaçu Futebol Clube, where he was loaned to Estanciano, Clube Atlético Linense and FC Shukura Kobuleti. He played professional in Campeonato Brasileiro Série B with Londrina Esporte Clube, making seven appearances for the club during the 2019 season.

On 1 July 2019, Marcelinho signed a four years contract with Marítimo
