= Manduzão =

Multi-use stadium in Pouso Alegre, Brazil

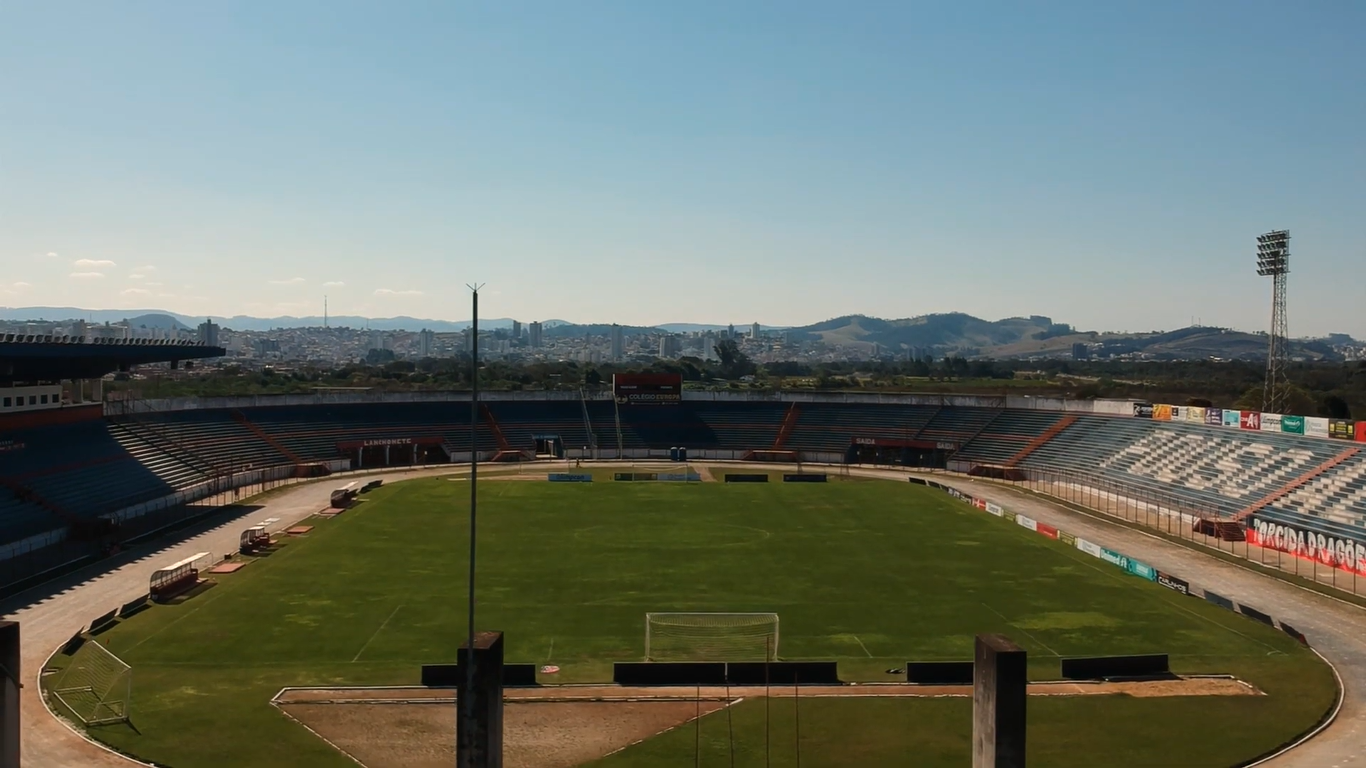
- Interactive map of Manduzão
- Full name: Estádio Municipal Irmão Gino Maria Rossi
- Former names: Estádio Municipal de Pouso Alegre
- Location: Pouso Alegre, MG, Brazil
- Coordinates: 22.251389°S 45.921667°W
- Owner: City of Pouso Alegre
- Operator: City of Pouso Alegre
- Capacity: 26,000
- Surface: Natural grass
- Record attendance: 14,388 (Pouso Alegre vs ASA, 27 August 2022)
- Field size: 110 × 75 m

Construction
- Groundbreaking: 1996
- Built: 1997
- Opened: 1997
- Renovated: 2013

Tenant
- Pouso Alegre

Estádio Municipal Irmão Gino Maria Rossi, commonly known as Manduzão, is a multi-use stadium in Pouso Alegre, Minas Gerais, Brazil. It is used mostly for football matches, and has a maximum capacity of 26,000 people.

Inaugurated in 1997, the stadium was formerly known as Estádio Municipal de Pouso Alegre. It had its record attendance on 27 August 2022, when Pouso Alegre defeated ASA 1–0 in the 2022 Série D semifinals.
