= Zé Carlos (footballer, born 1985) =

Brazilian footballer

Personal information
- Full name: José Carlos dos Anjos Sávio
- Date of birth: 9 September 1985 (age 41)
- Place of birth: Criciúma, Brazil
- Height: 1.85 m (6 ft 1 in)
- Position: Goalkeeper

Team information
- Current team: Ypiranga
- Number: 35

Youth career
- Criciúma

Senior career*
Years	Team	Apps	(Gls)
2004–2009	Criciúma	167	(3)
2009	→ Paraná (loan)	16	(0)
2010–2012	Avaí	28	(0)
2011	→ Paraná (loan)	28	(1)
2012	→ Oeste (loan)	15	(0)
2012	→ Boa Esporte (loan)	10	(0)
2013	Paysandu	24	(0)
2014	ASA	5	(0)
2014–2015	Atlético Tubarão	4	(0)
2015–2016	Fast Clube	15	(0)
2016	Itumbiara	0	(0)
2016	Santo André	13	(0)
2016	Brusque	8	(0)
2016–2017	Marcílio Dias	8	(0)
2017	Santo André	13	(0)
2017	Londrina	2	(0)
2017	Concórdia	13	(0)
2018	Santo André	2	(0)
2018	Concórdia	5	(0)
2018	Camboriú	19	(0)
2019–2022	Brusque	81	(0)
2022	→ São Bento (loan)	19	(0)
2022	Metropolitano	0	(0)
2023	São Bento	31	(0)
2023	Floresta	17	(0)
2024	Inter de Limeira	1	(0)
2025–	Ypiranga	17	(0)
- * Club domestic league appearances and goals as of 10 November 2026

José Carlos dos Anjos Sávio, better known as Zé Carlos (born 9 September 1985), is a Brazilian professional footballer who plays as a goalkeeper for Ypiranga.

== Career ==
Zé Carlos was revealed in the basic categories of Criciúma. He made his debut as a starter in March 2004 in the game against Camboriuense where the Criciúma won 3–0. In his time at the club, Ze Carlos scored three goals, one of which helped the team win the title of the Series C do Brasileiro 2006. He also participated in the Brazil national under-17 football team in 2003.

In 2009, Zé Carlos was hired by Avaí, but was loaned to the dispute of Paraná to Brazilian Serie B. At the end of their participation in the Paraná team was announced as a reinforcement of Avaí for the 2010 season.

On 12 May 2011, he left Brazilian Série A side Avai and joined his former club Paraná in the Série B on free transfer to play as a regular starter.

== Career statistics ==
(Correct as of 30 April 2011)

Club	Season	State League		Brazilian Série A		Copa do Brasil		Copa Sudamericana		Total	
Club	Season	Apps	Goals	Apps	Goals	Apps	Goals	Apps	Goals	Apps	Goals
Avaí	2010	-	-	16	0	5	0	-	-	21	0
Avaí	2011	12	0	-	-	1	0	-	-	13	0
Total		12	0	16	0	6	0	0	0	34	0

== Honours ==
Criciúma

- Campeonato Brasileiro Série C: 2006
- Campeonato Catarinense: 2005

Avaí

- Campeonato Catarinense: 2010
