= Jamesson =

Brazilian footballer

Personal information
- Full name: Jamesson Andrade de Brito
- Date of birth: 13 August 1985 (age 41)
- Place of birth: Paulista, Brazil
- Height: 1.70 m (5 ft 7 in)
- Position: Right-back

Senior career*
Years	Team	Apps	(Gls)
2004–2006	Santa Cruz		
2007	Cabense		
2007	Caxias		
2008	Joinville		
2008	Central	5	(0)
2009	Sergipe		
2009	Noroeste		
2010	Ituiutaba	4	(0)
2010	URT		
2010	Cabense		
2010	Chã Grande		
2011	Atlético Sorocaba		
2011	Chã Grande		
2012	Araripina	15	(1)
2012	Treze	4	(0)
2013	CSE		
2013	Serra Talhada	5	(0)
2014	Cianorte	8	(1)
2014	Itabaiana		
2014	Rio Branco-AC	8	(2)
2015	Fast Clube	7	(0)
2016	Cianorte	5	(0)
2017	Afogados	7	(1)
2017	Penarol	10	(1)
2017	Central	4	(0)
2018	Fast Clube	9	(0)
2018	Cabense	8	(0)
2019	Lagarto	5	(0)

Managerial career
- 2019–2020: Vera Cruz
- 2020: Retrô U17
- 2021: Ipojuca
- 2021–2022: Retrô U20
- 2022: Portuguesa Londrinense U20
- 2022: Ipojuca
- 2023: Atlético Torres
- 2024: Dom Bosco
- 2024: Atlético Torres U20
- 2025: Retrô U20
- 2025: Retrô (interim)
- 2026: Retrô
- * Club domestic league appearances and goals

Jamesson Andrade de Brito (born 13 August 1985), simply known as Jamesson, is a Brazilian football coach and former player who played as a right-back.
