= Maurício Souza (footballer) =

Brazilian football coach

Personal information
- Full name: Maurício Ferreira de Souza
- Date of birth: 13 March 1974 (age 52)
- Place of birth: Rio de Janeiro, Brazil
- Height: 1.83 m (6 ft 0 in)
- Position: Midfielder

Youth career
- America-RJ

Senior career*
Years	Team	Apps	(Gls)
1995–1997	America-RJ		

Managerial career
- 2020–2021: Flamengo (interim)
- 2022: Vasco da Gama
- 2023–2024: Madura United
- 2024: Red Bull Bragantino II
- 2025: Guarani
- 2025–2026: Persija Jakarta
- * Club domestic league appearances and goals

Maurício Ferreira de Souza (born 13 March 1974), known as Maurício Souza or simply Maurício, is a Brazilian professional football manager and former player who was most recently the head coach of Super League club Persija Jakarta.

== Managerial career ==
Born in Rio de Janeiro, Souza was an America-RJ youth graduate. After three years in the main squad, he switched to futsal and played the remainder of his career in the sport.

Souza's first managerial role back in football occurred in 2010, after Botafogo established a partnership with his futsal side Casa d'España; he was appointed in charge of the youth teams. In 2014, already in charge of the under-20s, he became Eduardo Hungaro's assistant in the main squad.

On 25 February 2016, Souza was dismissed at Bota. Shortly after he joined Flamengo; initially a coordinator of the futsal squad of the club, he took over the under-17 side in 2017.

Promoted to the under-20 squad in the end of 2017, Souza was also an assistant coach of Maurício Barbieri and Dorival Júnior in the main squad during the 2018 campaign; he was also an interim head coach during two Copa Libertadores matches, as Barbieri was suspended. He was also in charge of the main squad for the four first matches of the 2020 Campeonato Carioca, as head coach Jorge Jesus and the entire first-team squad was given an extended holiday period.

Souza was named interim head coach of Fla on 9 November 2020, after the dismissal of Domènec Torrent, but his spell only lasted one day as the club signed Rogério Ceni. He was also an interim when Ceni was sacked in July 2021, and was named at the same role until the end of the season on 29 November 2021, after Renato Gaúcho was dismissed.

Souza was fired by Flamengo on 10 January 2022, and moved to Athletico Paranaense roughly one month later, also as an assistant coach. He left the latter club after the departure of Alberto Valentim in April.

On 13 June 2022, Souza was named head coach of Série B side Vasco da Gama. He was sacked on 24 July, after just eight matches.

On 2 May 2023, Souza moved abroad for the first time in his career, after being appointed in charge of Indonesian Liga 1 side Madura United. He left on 10 May 2024 after the season ended, and joined Red Bull Bragantino eight days later, as head coach of the under-23 team.

Souza won the 2024 Campeonato Brasileiro Sub-23 with Bragantino, before leaving on 4 December of that year. Just hours later, he agreed to become Guarani's head coach for the upcoming season.

Souza was sacked from Guarani on 22 April 2025, after a poor start in the year's Série C.

On 27 May 2025, Souza was announced as Persija Jakarta new head coach, thus returning to Indonesia. On 26 May 2026, Souza left Persija, as his contract was not renewed.

== Managerial statistics ==
As of 31 May 2026

Managerial record by team and tenure
Team	Nat.	From	To	Record					Ref.
Team	Nat.	From	To	G	W	D	L	Win %	Ref.
Flamengo (caretaker)	(Brazil)	29 November 2021	12 December 2021	4	1	1	2	25.00	
Vasco da Gama	(Brazil)	15 June 2022	24 July 2022	8	3	2	3	37.50	
Madura United	(Indonesia)	1 May 2023	10 May 2024	34	15	10	9	44.12	
Guarani	(Brazil)	5 December 2024	22 April 2025	14	3	4	7	21.43	
Persija Jakarta	(Indonesia)	1 July 2025	31 May 2026	34	22	5	7	64.71	
Career Total				94	44	22	28	46.81	

== Honours ==
Flamengo U20

- Copa São Paulo de Futebol Júnior: 2018

Red Bull Bragantino U23

- Campeonato Brasileiro Sub-23: 2024

Individual

- Liga 1/Super League Coach of the Month: August 2023, August 2025, November 2025
