= Ypiranga Futebol Clube =

Brazilian association football club based in Erechim, Rio Grande do Sul, Brazil

Ypiranga
- Full name: Ypiranga Futebol Clube
- Nickname: Canarinho (Little Canary)
- Founded: 18 August 1924; 102 years ago
- Ground: Estádio Olímpico Colosso da Lagoa
- Capacity: 22,000
- President: Adílson Stankiewicz
- Head coach: Luizinho Vieira
- League: Campeonato Brasileiro Série C Campeonato Gaúcho
- 2025 2025: Série C, 10th of 20; Gaúcho, 5th of 12
- Website: www.yfc.com.br
Home colors	Away colors	Third colors

Ypiranga Futebol Clube, commonly referred to as Ypiranga de Erechim or Ypiranga, is a Brazilian professional football club based in Erechim, Rio Grande do Sul. Founded in 1924, it competes in the Campeonato Brasileiro Série C, the third tier of Brazilian football, as well as in the Campeonato Gaúcho, the top flight of the Rio Grande do Sul state football league.

== History ==
The origins of Ypiranga Futebol Clube go back to the rivalry with Ítalo-Brasileiro, then the only club in the city of Erechim. In 1924, a match between Ítalo-Brasileiro and Douradense, team from Linha Dourado, was being played in the field where the Júlio de Castilhos square is located today, in the center of Erechim. A group of people who had recently arrived in town showed support for Douradense – a fact that caused a general confusion at the end of the match. The next day, in the ballroom of Hotel Central on Avenida Maurício Cardoso, the group of soccer enthusiasts decided to create a new club. Their patriotic motivation gave the new association the colors green and yellow, as well as a name that referred to Brazil's independence, and on 18 August 1924, Ypiranga Futebol Clube was born.

On 20 September 1924, the club played its first game, a 1–0 victory over Italo-Brasileiro.

The club became professional in 1965, and two years later won their first title, the Campeonato Gaucho A2 (Second Division). In 1970 the Colosso da Lagoa opened with a match between Gremio and Pelé's Santos, where he scored his 1040th goal.

In 2010, the club made its first Copa do Brasil appearance, losing to Avaí 3–0. In 2016, the club had their best Copa do Brasil campaign, eliminating Atletico Goianense and Aparecidense before losing 3-1 on aggregate to Fluminense.

In 2019, the club won their fifth Campeonato Gaucho A2 title, and in the Serie C, the club topped their group in the first stage, being eliminated by Confiança in the first round of the playoffs, and finishing seventh overall. In 2020, the club topped the table in the first stage again, but missed out on promotion in the playoffs following a new format, finishing third in the group and sixth in the overall table. In 2021, the club topped the first stage table for the third consecutive time, but missed out on promotion and finished fifth in the overall table, their best finish ever. The club also had the best attack of the first phase, with the team scoring 26 goals, led by league goalscorer Quirino. The following year, the club finished runner-up in the Campeonato Gaucho; Ypiranga topped the table in the first stage, including a 3–1 victory over Serie A club Internacional, before losing the finals to Gremio 3–1 on aggregate.

== Stadium ==
Since the beginning of its activities in the soccer department, in 1924, Ypiranga played its matches in a stadium known as "Estádio da Montanha", located at Rua Bento Gonçalves, Ipiranga district, in a field that deteriorated over time and was abandoned. At that time, the club's headquarters was on Rua Alemanha, in the city center.

After receiving the support of the club's president in 1964, Oscar Abal, the idea of building its own stadium was started, on a piece of land that had a lagoon and a quarry around it. In 1967, the construction of Ypiranga's own stadium began, located on Avenida Sete de Setembro, considered one of the city's most traditional avenues. The enterprise only became viable due to the sale of patrimonial titles and with the raffle of cars and household appliances, in a moment when the club reached 50 thousand patrimonial members, including abroad. With the decision taken, it also became necessary to sell and subsequently demolish the Mountain Stadium to pay for the financial costs of building its own stadium.

The capacity of the stadium Colosso da Lagoa, at the time of its construction, was 30,000 people. However, with the FIFA standards put in place to avoid problems caused by overcrowding, its maximum capacity was reduced to 22,000 spectators. This reduction is also due to the implementation of two thousand white chairs in a sector of the bleachers, which come from the Estádio Beira-Rio, which would no longer be used after the renovation made for the 2014 FIFA World Cup. Despite the reduction in capacity by about eight thousand seats, the Colosso da Lagoa is the fourth stadium in number of spectators in Rio Grande do Sul, and the largest in the countryside.

== Current squad ==
As of 8 October 2026

Note: Flags indicate national team as defined under FIFA eligibility rules; some limited exceptions apply. Players may hold more than one non-FIFA nationality.

No.	Pos.	Nation	Player
2	DF	BRA	Cleiton
3	DF	BRA	Willian Gomes
4	DF	BRA	Reinaldo
5	MF	BRA	Robson Lopes (on loan from Mixto)
7	FW	BRA	Felipe Ferreira
9	FW	BRA	Vinicius Charopem
10	MF	BRA	Léo Rafael (on loan from Nova Iguaçu)
11	MF	BRA	Allison
12	GK	BRA	Edu Araújo
15	FW	BRA	Pedro Lucas
16	MF	BRA	Lucas Ramos
17	FW	BRA	Henrique
20	MF	BRA	Dudu

No.	Pos.	Nation	Player
21	DF	BRA	Léo Gobo
22	DF	BRA	Walce
27	MF	BRA	Dionísio
28	FW	BRA	Gustavo Simões
35	GK	BRA	Zé Carlos
40	MF	BRA	Kauan Bruno
41	DF	BRA	Adilson Júnior
43	MF	BRA	Ramon Vinicius
44	DF	BRA	Wesllen
79	MF	BRA	Nathan Zamith
80	FW	BRA	Marcelinho
85	GK	BRA	Lucas Maticoli

=== Out on loan ===
Note: Flags indicate national team as defined under FIFA eligibility rules; some limited exceptions apply. Players may hold more than one non-FIFA nationality.

No. / Pos. / Nation / Player	No. / Pos. / Nation / Player

== Former players ==
- (Brazil) Rafael
- (Brazil) Neuton

== Honours ==
=== Official tournaments ===
State
Competitions	Titles	Seasons
Campeonato Gaúcho Série A2	5	1967, 1989, 2008, 2014, 2019

- record

=== Others tournaments ===
==== State ====
- Campeonato do Interior Gaúcho (2): 2009, 2023
- Taça Farroupilha (1): 2025

==== City ====
- Campeonato Citadino de Erechim (8): 1928, 1945, 1949, 1950, 1951, 1952, 1953, 2024

=== Runners-up ===
- Campeonato Gaúcho (1): 2022
- Copa FGF (2): 2009, 2024
- Recopa Gaúcha (1): 2017
- Super Copa Gaúcha (1): 2016
