= Brasilis Futebol Clube =

Brasilis
- Full name: Brasilis Futebol Clube
- Nickname(s): Arara (Macao)
- Founded: 1 January 2007; 18 years ago
- Ground: Estádio Leonardo Barbieri
- Capacity: 7,200
- President: Matheus Nava Bernardi
- 2020: Paulista Série A4, 24th of 35
- Website: http://www.brasilisfc.com.br/
Home colours	Away colours	Third colours

Brasilis Futebol Clube, more commonly referred to as Brasilis, is a Brazilian football club based in Águas de Lindoia, São Paulo. Currently, the club's senior team is inactive and has not participated in any professional matches since 2020. (Note: The club's youth teams are still playing in the state tournaments)

== History ==
Brasilis Futebol Clube was founded on 1 January 2007 by Oscar Bernardi (who is also the owner of the club), a former defender who had great spells in Ponte Preta, São Paulo and the Brazil national team, including being one of the captains of the national team in the 1982 World Cup in Spain.

In the same year of 2007, the team disputes its first professional competition: the Segunda Divisão (equivalent to the fourth division) of the Paulista Championship, being eliminated in the 1st phase. The following year he competed again in the competition, falling this time in the 2nd phase. In 2009 the team stayed away from professional competitions, returning again in 2010 in the same Second Division, falling again in the 2nd phase. In 2011 Brasilis once again falls into the 2nd phase. After that year, the club stayed in a long period of hiatus, returning to professional competitions in 2017, the year in which the club, in the month of May, was part of an ESPN Brasil reality show, showing journalist Paulo Calçade as a coach.

== Stadium ==
Brasilis Futebol Clube play their home games at Estádio Municipal Leonardo Barbieri. The stadium has a maximum capacity of 7,329 people.
