= Moacir Júnior =

Brazilian football manager (born 1967)

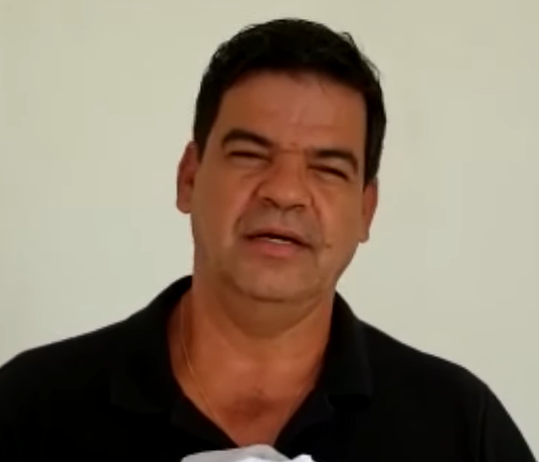
- Moacir Júnior in 2021

Personal information
- Full name: Moacir Vieira de Araújo Júnior
- Date of birth: 15 February 1967 (age 59)
- Place of birth: Curvelo, Brazil
- Height: 1.87 m (6 ft 2 in)
- Position: Centre-back

Team information
- Current team: América Mineiro (head coach)

Youth career
- 1981–1987: Cruzeiro

Senior career*
Years	Team	Apps	(Gls)
1988	Cruzeiro	0	(0)
1989	Fabril		
1989	Atlético Três Corações		
1990	Vitória-ES		
1991	FC Augsburg		
1992	SR Donaufeld Wien		
1993–1995	BSC Sendling		
1996	Admira Wacker		

Managerial career
- 2000: Atlética Aciaria
- 2001: Tombense U20
- 2002: Tombense
- 2002: Ipatinga (assistant)
- 2002: Francana
- 2003: FC Blue Rose (youth)
- 2003–2004: Comercial-SP
- 2004: Estrela do Norte
- 2005: Real Salvador
- 2005: Comercial-SP
- 2005: Estrela do Norte
- 2006: Bahia U20
- 2006: Vitória-ES
- 2007: Social
- 2007–2008: Tupi
- 2008: Paulista
- 2008: Ipatinga
- 2009: Democrata-GV
- 2009: Villa Nova
- 2010: Democrata-GV
- 2010–2011: Uberlândia
- 2011: Coritiba
- 2012: Tupi
- 2013: Vitória da Conquista
- 2013–2014: Tombense
- 2014: América Mineiro
- 2014: ABC
- 2015: Náutico
- 2015: Criciúma
- 2015: Boa Esporte
- 2016: Linense
- 2016: Tombense
- 2017: Botafogo-SP
- 2017: Cuiabá
- 2018: Linense
- 2018: Volta Redonda
- 2019: América de Natal
- 2020: Portuguesa
- 2020: Treze
- 2020–2021: Botafogo-SP
- 2021–2022: ABC
- 2022–2023: Aparecidense
- 2023: Manaus
- 2023: Tombense
- 2024: Botafogo-PB
- 2025: São José-SP
- 2025: América de Natal
- 2026: Osasco Sporting
- 2026: CSA
- 2026–: América Mineiro
- * Club domestic league appearances and goals

Moacir Vieira de Araújo Júnior (born 15 February 1967), known as Moacir Júnior, is a Brazilian football coach and former player who played as a central defender. He is the current head coach of América Mineiro.

== Honours ==
Estrela do Norte

- Copa Espírito Santo: 2005

Tupi

- Campeonato Mineiro Módulo II: 2007

América de Natal

- Campeonato Potiguar: 2019

Treze

- Campeonato Paraibano: 2020
- CSA
- Copa Alagoas: 2026
