= 2023 Campeonato Brasileiro Série B =

Football competition held in Brazil

Campeonato Brasileiro Série B
- Season: 2023
- Dates: 14 April – 25 November
- Champions: Vitória (1st title)
- Promoted: Atlético Goianiense; Criciúma; Juventude; Vitória
- Relegated: ABC; Londrina; Sampaio Corrêa; Tombense
- Matches: 380
- Goals: 796 (2.09 per match)
- Top goalscorer: Gustavo Coutinho (14 goals)
- Biggest home win: CRB 6–0 Vitória; R27, 10 September
- Biggest away win: Nine matches 0–3; One match 1–4
- Highest scoring: Six goals Four matches 3–3; Two matches 4–2; One match 6–0
- Longest winning run: 7 games Novorizontino
- Longest unbeaten run: 11 games Juventude
- Longest winless run: 14 games ABC
- Longest losing run: 5 games Londrina; Tombense
- Highest attendance: 41,153; Ceará 2–0 Chapecoense; R10, 2 June
- Lowest attendance: 179; Tombense 1–1 Guarani; R9, 28 May
- Total attendance: 2,372,095
- Average attendance: 6,242

The 2023 Campeonato Brasileiro Série B (officially the Brasileirão Série B Betano 2023 for sponsorship reasons) was a football competition held in Brazil, equivalent to the second division. The competition began on 14 April and ended on 25 November.

Twenty teams competed in the tournament, twelve returning from the 2022 season, four promoted from the 2022 Campeonato Brasileiro Série C (ABC, Botafogo-SP, Mirassol and Vitória), and four relegated from the 2022 Campeonato Brasileiro Série A (Atlético Goianiense, Avaí, Ceará and Juventude).

The top four teams were promoted to the 2024 Campeonato Brasileiro Série A. Vitória became the first club to be promoted on 12 November 2023 after a 2–1 win against Novorizontino. Criciúma were promoted on 18 November 2023, and Juventude and Atlético Goianiense were promoted on 25 November 2023.

ABC, Londrina, Sampaio Corrêa and Tombense were relegated to the 2024 Campeonato Brasileiro Série C.

== Teams ==
Twenty teams competed in the league – twelve teams from the previous season, as well as four teams promoted from the Série C, and four teams relegated from the Série A.

Location of teams in 2023 Série B

Pos.	Relegated from 2022 Série A
17th	Ceará
18th	Atlético Goianiense
19th	Avaí
20th	Juventude

Pos.	Promoted from 2022 Série C
1st	Mirassol
2nd	ABC
3rd	Botafogo-SP
4th	Vitória

=== Number of teams by state ===
Number of teams	State	Team(s)
6	São Paulo	Botafogo-SP, Guarani, Ituano, Mirassol, Novorizontino and Ponte Preta
3	Santa Catarina	Avaí, Chapecoense and Criciúma
2	Goiás	Atlético Goianiense and Vila Nova
1	Alagoas	CRB
1	Bahia	Vitória
1	Ceará	Ceará
1	Maranhão	Sampaio Corrêa
1	Minas Gerais	Tombense
1	Paraná	Londrina
1	Pernambuco	Sport
1	Rio Grande do Norte	ABC
1	Rio Grande do Sul	Juventude

=== Stadiums and locations ===
Team	Home city	State	Stadium	Capacity
ABC	Natal	Rio Grande do Norte	Frasqueirão	18,000
ABC	Natal	Rio Grande do Norte	Arena das Dunas	32,050
Atlético Goianiense	Goiânia	Goiás	Antônio Accioly	12,500
Avaí	Florianópolis	Santa Catarina	Ressacada	17,826
Botafogo-SP	Ribeirão Preto	São Paulo	Santa Cruz	29,292
Botafogo-SP	Ribeirão Preto	São Paulo	Palma Travassos	18,277
Ceará	Fortaleza	Ceará	Castelão	63,903
Ceará	Fortaleza	Ceará	Presidente Vargas	20,262
Chapecoense	Chapecó	Santa Catarina	Arena Condá	20,089
CRB	Maceió	Alagoas	Rei Pelé	17,126
Criciúma	Criciúma	Santa Catarina	Heriberto Hülse	19,225
Guarani	Campinas	São Paulo	Brinco de Ouro	29,130
Ituano	Itu	São Paulo	Novelli Júnior	18,560
Juventude	Caxias do Sul	Rio Grande do Sul	Alfredo Jaconi	19,924
Londrina	Londrina	Paraná	Estádio do Café	31,000
Mirassol	Mirassol	São Paulo	Campos Maia	15,000
Novorizontino	Novo Horizonte	São Paulo	Doutor Jorge Ismael de Biasi	16,000
Ponte Preta	Campinas	São Paulo	Moisés Lucarelli	19,728
Sampaio Corrêa	São Luís	Maranhão	Castelão	40,149
Sport	Recife	Pernambuco	Ilha do Retiro	32,983
Tombense	Tombos	Minas Gerais	Almeidão	3,050
Tombense	Tombos	Minas Gerais	Soares de Azevedo (Muriaé)	13,971
Vila Nova	Goiânia	Goiás	Onésio Brasileiro Alvarenga	6,500
Vila Nova	Goiânia	Goiás	Serra Dourada	42,000
Vitória	Salvador	Bahia	Barradão	34,535

== Personnel and kits ==
Team	Head coach	Captain	Kit manufacturer	Main kit sponsor
ABC	(Brazil) Jonydei Tostão (caretaker)	(Brazil) Matheus Anjos	Elefante MQ (club manufactured kit)	Esportes da Sorte
Atlético Goianiense	(Brazil) Jair Ventura	(Brazil) Ronaldo	Dragão Premium (club manufactured kit)	Blaze.com
Avaí	(Brazil) Eduardo Barroca	(Brazil) Bruno Cortez	Umbro	PixBet
Botafogo-SP	(Brazil) José Leão (caretaker)	(Brazil) Osman	Volt Sport	EstrelaBet
Ceará	(Brazil) Vagner Mancini	(Brazil) Luiz Otávio	Vozão (club manufactured kit)	EstrelaBet
Chapecoense	(Brazil) Claudinei Oliveira	(Brazil) Airton	Umbro	Aurora
CRB	(Brazil) Daniel Paulista	(Brazil) Auremir	Regatas (club manufactured kit)	Champion Watch
Criciúma	(Brazil) Cláudio Tencati	(Brazil) Rodrigo	Volt Sport	EstrelaBet
Guarani	(Brazil) Umberto Louzer	(Brazil) Diogo Mateus	Kappa	Furacão - FW Distribuidora
Ituano	(Brazil) Marcinho Freitas	(Brazil) Jefferson Paulino	Alluri	Betfast.io
Juventude	(Brazil) Thiago Carpini	(Brazil) Nenê	19treze (club manufactured kit)	PixBet
Londrina	(Brazil) Roberto Fonseca Júnior (caretaker)	(Brazil) João Paulo	Karilu	PADO
Mirassol	(Brazil) Mozart	(Brazil) Gabriel	Physicus	Guaraná Poty
Novorizontino	(Brazil) Eduardo Baptista	(Brazil) Douglas Baggio	Physicus	Açúcar Santa Isabel
Ponte Preta	(Brazil) João Brigatti	(Brazil) Fábio Sanches	1900 (club manufactured kit)	EstrelaBet
Sampaio Corrêa	(Brazil) Dejair Ferreira (caretaker)	(Brazil) Pará	Finta	VITALMED, PAGBET
Sport	(Brazil) César Lucena (caretaker)	(Brazil) Rafael Thyere	Umbro	Betnacional
Tombense	(Brazil) Moacir Júnior	(Brazil) Roger Carvalho	Vettor	ValSports
Vila Nova	(Brazil) Higo Magalhães	(Brazil) Rafael Donato	V43 (club manufactured kit)	Grupo Luztol, Esportes da Sorte
Vitória	(Brazil) Léo Condé	(Brazil) Zeca	Volt Sport	Betnacional

=== Coaching changes ===
Team	Outgoing head coach	Manner of departure	Date of vacancy	Position in table	Incoming head coach	Date of appointment	Ref
CRB	(Brazil) Daniel Barboza	End of caretaker spell	6 November 2022	Pre-season	(Brazil) Umberto Louzer	5 November 2022	
Londrina	(Brazil) Adilson Batista	End of contract	6 November 2022	Pre-season	(Brazil) Edinho	18 October 2022	
Novorizontino	(Brazil) Mazola Júnior	End of contract	8 November 2022	Pre-season	(Brazil) Eduardo Baptista	16 November 2022	
Chapecoense	(Brazil) Gilmar Dal Pozzo	End of contract	8 November 2022	Pre-season	(Brazil) Bruno Pivetti	9 November 2022	
Tombense	(Brazil) Bruno Pivetti	Signed by Chapecoense	9 November 2022	Pre-season	(Brazil) Marcelo Chamusca	9 November 2022	
Avaí	(Brazil) Fabrício Bento	End of caretaker spell	13 November 2022	Pre-season	(Brazil) Alex	16 November 2022	
Ceará	(Brazil) Juca Antonello	End of caretaker spell	13 November 2022	Pre-season	(Paraguay) Gustavo Morínigo	22 November 2022	
Sport	(Brazil) Claudinei Oliveira	Mutual agreement	16 November 2022	Pre-season	(Brazil) Enderson Moreira	18 November 2022	
Sampaio Corrêa	(Brazil) Léo Condé	End of contract	17 November 2022	Pre-season	(Brazil) Felipe Conceição	18 November 2022	
Vila Nova	(Brazil) Allan Aal	Sacked	23 November 2022	Pre-season	(Brazil) Claudinei Oliveira	1 December 2022	
Londrina	(Brazil) Edinho	Resigned	5 February 2023	State leagues	(Brazil) Omar Feitosa	6 February 2023	
Vitória	(Brazil) João Burse	Sacked	5 February 2023	State leagues	(Brazil) Ricardo Amadeu (caretaker)	5 February 2023	
Ituano	(Brazil) Carlos Pimentel	Sacked	6 February 2023	State leagues	(Brazil) Chico Elias (caretaker)	6 February 2023	
Vitória	(Brazil) Ricardo Amadeu	End of caretaker spell	8 February 2023	State leagues	(Brazil) Léo Condé	7 February 2023	
Ituano	(Brazil) Chico Elias	End of caretaker spell	10 February 2023	State leagues	(Brazil) Gilmar Dal Pozzo	10 February 2023	
Guarani	(Brazil) Mozart	Sacked	19 February 2023	State leagues	(Brazil) Moisés Moura (caretaker)	22 February 2023	
Botafogo-SP	(Brazil) Paulo Baier	Sacked	21 February 2023	State leagues	(Brazil) José Leão (caretaker)	21 February 2023	
Londrina	(Brazil) Omar Feitosa	Sacked	23 February 2023	State leagues	(Brazil) Edson Vieira (caretaker)	23 February 2023	
Botafogo-SP	(Brazil) José Leão	End of caretaker spell	25 February 2023	State leagues	(Brazil) Adilson Batista	23 February 2023	
Juventude	(Brazil) Celso Roth	Resigned	25 February 2023	State leagues	(Brazil) Adaílton Bolzan (caretaker)	25 February 2023	
Atlético Goianiense	(Brazil) Eduardo Souza	Sacked	3 March 2023	State leagues	(Brazil) Anderson Gomes (caretaker)	3 March 2023	
Sampaio Corrêa	(Brazil) Felipe Conceição	Sacked	7 March 2023	State leagues	(Brazil) Evaristo Piza	7 March 2023	
Atlético Goianiense	(Brazil) Anderson Gomes	End of caretaker spell	11 March 2023	State leagues	(Brazil) Mozart	11 March 2023	
Juventude	(Brazil) Adaílton Bolzan	End of caretaker spell	11 March 2023	State leagues	(Brazil) Pintado	11 March 2023	
Londrina	(Brazil) Edson Vieira	End of caretaker spell	14 March 2023	State leagues	(Brazil) Alexandre Gallo	14 March 2023	
Chapecoense	(Brazil) Bruno Pivetti	Sacked	18 March 2023	State leagues	(Brazil) Argel Fuchs	19 March 2023	
Guarani	(Brazil) Moisés Moura	End of caretaker spell	24 March 2023	State leagues	(Brazil) Bruno Pivetti	27 March 2023	
Ponte Preta	(Brazil) Hélio dos Anjos	Mutual agreement	18 April 2023	20th	(Brazil) Felipe Moreira	19 April 2023	
Ceará	(Paraguay) Gustavo Morínigo	Sacked	24 April 2023	20th	(Brazil) Eduardo Barroca	24 April 2023	
Atlético Goianiense	(Brazil) Mozart	Sacked	1 May 2023	7th	(Brazil) Anderson Gomes (caretaker)	1 May 2023	
Avaí	(Brazil) Alex	Sacked	3 May 2023	16th	(Brazil) Fabrício Bento (caretaker)	5 May 2023	
Mirassol	(Brazil) Ricardo Catalá	Sacked	4 May 2023	8th	(Brazil) Mozart	4 May 2023	
Sampaio Corrêa	(Brazil) Evaristo Piza	Sacked	4 May 2023	18th	(Brazil) Edson Medeiros (caretaker)	5 May 2023	
Atlético Goianiense	(Brazil) Anderson Gomes	End of caretaker spell	5 May 2023	6th	(Brazil) Alberto Valentim	5 May 2023	
Sampaio Corrêa	(Brazil) Edson Medeiros (caretaker)	End of caretaker spell	7 May 2023	12th	(Brazil) Márcio Fernandes	7 May 2023	
Juventude	(Brazil) Pintado	Sacked	8 May 2023	18th	(Brazil) Adaílton Bolzan (caretaker)	8 May 2023	
Londrina	(Brazil) Alexandre Gallo	Sacked	9 May 2023	17th	(Brazil) Edson Vieira (caretaker)	9 May 2023	
Juventude	(Brazil) Adaílton Bolzan (caretaker)	End of caretaker spell	13 May 2023	19th	(Brazil) Thiago Carpini	13 May 2023	
ABC	(Brazil) Fernando Marchiori	Mutual agreement	14 May 2023	20th	(Brazil) Jonydei Tostão (caretaker)	15 May 2023	
Avaí	(Brazil) Fabrício Bento	End of caretaker spell	15 May 2023	14th	(Paraguay) Gustavo Morínigo	15 May 2023	
ABC	(Brazil) Jonydei Tostão	End of caretaker spell	18 May 2023	20th	(Brazil) Allan Aal	18 May 2023	
Ituano	(Brazil) Gilmar Dal Pozzo	Sacked	21 May 2023	13th	(Brazil) Douglas Leite (caretaker)	21 May 2023	
Ituano	(Brazil) Douglas Leite	End of caretaker spell	26 May 2023	11th	(Brazil) Marcinho Freitas	26 May 2023	
CRB	(Brazil) Umberto Louzer	Sacked	27 May 2023	18th	(Brazil) Daniel Paulista	28 May 2023	
Londrina	(Brazil) Edson Vieira	End of caretaker spell	28 May 2023	13th	(Brazil) PC Gusmão	29 May 2023	
Chapecoense	(Brazil) Argel Fuchs	Sacked	29 May 2023	16th	(Brazil) Gilmar Dal Pozzo (Note: Emerson Cris was the caretaker head coach in the 10th round against Ceará on 2 June)	30 May 2023	
Tombense	(Brazil) Marcelo Chamusca	Sacked	5 June 2023	19th	(Brazil) Julian Tobar (caretaker)	5 June 2023	
Guarani	(Brazil) Bruno Pivetti	Sacked	8 June 2023	11th	(Brazil) Ben-Hur Moreira (caretaker)	8 June 2023	
Tombense	(Brazil) Julian Tobar	End of caretaker spell	11 June 2023	18th	(Brazil) João Burse	8 June 2023	
Guarani	(Brazil) Ben-Hur Moreira	End of caretaker spell	13 June 2023	11th	(Brazil) Umberto Louzer	13 June 2023	
Botafogo-SP	(Brazil) Adilson Batista	Sacked	24 June 2023	10th	(Brazil) Marcelo Chamusca (Note: José Leão was the caretaker head coach in the 14th round against Novorizontino on 28 June)	25 June 2023	
Ceará	(Brazil) Eduardo Barroca	Sacked	28 June 2023	7th	(Brazil) Guto Ferreira	29 June 2023	
Londrina	(Brazil) PC Gusmão	Mutual agreement	29 June 2023	17th	(Brazil) Franco Muller (caretaker)	1 July 2023	
Avaí	(Paraguay) Gustavo Morínigo	Sacked	2 July 2023	19th	(Brazil) Eduardo Barroca	3 July 2023	
Londrina	(Brazil) Franco Muller	End of caretaker spell	3 July 2023	18th	(Brazil) Eduardo Souza	3 July 2023	
Atlético Goianiense	(Brazil) Alberto Valentim	Sacked	10 July 2023	11th	(Brazil) Anderson Gomes (caretaker)	10 July 2023	
Ponte Preta	(Brazil) Felipe Moreira	Sacked	22 July 2023	13th	(Brazil) Pintado	24 July 2023	
Atlético Goianiense	(Brazil) Anderson Gomes	End of caretaker spell	24 July 2023	11th	(Brazil) Jair Ventura	24 July 2023	
Vila Nova	(Brazil) Claudinei Oliveira	Sacked	3 August 2023	7th	(Brazil) Marquinhos Santos	4 August 2023	
Chapecoense	(Brazil) Gilmar Dal Pozzo	Sacked	7 August 2023	19th	(Brazil) Claudinei Oliveira	9 August 2023	
Tombense	(Brazil) João Burse	Sacked	21 August 2023	18th	(Brazil) Moacir Júnior	22 August 2023	
Ceará	(Brazil) Guto Ferreira	Sacked	29 August 2023	11th	(Brazil) Vagner Mancini	30 August 2023	
ABC	(Brazil) Allan Aal	Sacked	2 September 2023	20th	(Brazil) Argel Fuchs	3 September 2023	
Sampaio Corrêa	(Brazil) Márcio Fernandes	Sacked	5 September 2023	17th	(Brazil) Fernando Marchiori	5 September 2023	
Londrina	(Brazil) Eduardo Souza	Sacked	7 September 2023	19th	(Brazil) Roberto Fonseca	9 September 2023	
Vila Nova	(Brazil) Marquinhos Santos	Sacked	20 September 2023	7th	(Brazil) Lisca	21 September 2023	
Ponte Preta	(Brazil) Pintado	Sacked	2 October 2023	15th	(Brazil) João Brigatti	2 October 2023	
Vila Nova	(Brazil) Lisca	Sacked	20 October 2023	9th	(Brazil) Higo Magalhães	23 October 2023	
Sampaio Corrêa	(Brazil) Fernando Marchiori	Mutual agreement	31 October 2023	15th	(Brazil) Dejair Ferreira (caretaker) (Note: Caretaker head coach until the end of the season.)	31 October 2023	
Botafogo-SP	(Brazil) Marcelo Chamusca	Resigned	13 November 2023	12th	(Brazil) José Leão (caretaker)	13 November 2023	
Londrina	(Brazil) Roberto Fonseca	Resigned	17 November 2023	19th	(Brazil) Roberto Fonseca Júnior (caretaker)	17 November 2023	
Sport	(Brazil) Enderson Moreira	Mutual agreement	19 November 2023	8th	(Brazil) César Lucena (caretaker)	20 November 2023	
ABC	(Brazil) Argel Fuchs	Mutual agreement	22 November 2023	20th	(Brazil) Jonydei Tostão (caretaker)	22 November 2023	

== League table ==
Pos	Team	Pld	W	D	L	GF	GA	GD	Pts	Promotion or relegation
1	Vitória (C, P)	38	22	6	10	50	31	+19	72	Promotion to 2024 Campeonato Brasileiro Série A
2	Juventude (P)	38	18	11	9	42	31	+11	65	Promotion to 2024 Campeonato Brasileiro Série A
3	Criciúma (P)	38	19	7	12	45	33	+12	64	Promotion to 2024 Campeonato Brasileiro Série A
4	Atlético Goianiense (P)	38	17	13	8	56	45	+11	64	Promotion to 2024 Campeonato Brasileiro Série A
5	Novorizontino	38	19	6	13	48	30	+18	63	
6	Mirassol	38	18	9	11	42	31	+11	63	
7	Sport	38	17	12	9	59	40	+19	63	
8	Vila Nova	38	17	10	11	49	30	+19	61	
9	CRB	38	16	9	13	45	39	+6	57	
10	Guarani	38	15	12	11	42	33	+9	57	
11	Ceará	38	13	11	14	40	45	−5	50	
12	Botafogo-SP	38	12	11	15	25	42	−17	47	
13	Avaí	38	10	14	14	31	48	−17	44	
14	Ituano	38	9	15	14	33	38	−5	42	
15	Ponte Preta	38	9	15	14	24	35	−11	42	
16	Chapecoense	38	9	13	16	38	43	−5	40	
17	Sampaio Corrêa (R)	38	8	15	15	31	43	−12	39	Relegation to 2024 Campeonato Brasileiro Série C
18	Tombense (R)	38	9	10	19	37	50	−13	37	Relegation to 2024 Campeonato Brasileiro Série C
19	Londrina (R)	38	7	10	21	31	58	−27	31	Relegation to 2024 Campeonato Brasileiro Série C
20	ABC (R)	38	5	13	20	28	51	−23	28	Relegation to 2024 Campeonato Brasileiro Série C

Source: CBF
Rules for classification: 1) points; 2) wins; 3) goal difference; 4) goals scored; 5) head-to-head results (only between 2 teams); 6) fewest red cards; 7) fewest yellow cards; 8) drawing of lots.
(C) Champions; (P) Promoted; (R) Relegated

=== Positions by round ===
The table lists the positions of teams after each week of matches. In order to preserve chronological evolvements, any postponed matches were not included to the round at which they were originally scheduled, but added to the full round they were played immediately afterwards.

Team ╲ Round	1	2	3	4	5	6	7	8	9	10	11	12	13	14	15	16	17	18	19	20	21	22	23	24	25	26	27	28	29	30	31	32	33	34	35	36	37	38
ABC	15	19	20	20	20	20	20	20	20	20	20	20	20	20	20	20	19	20	20	20	20	20	20	20	20	20	20	20	20	20	20	20	20	20	20	20	20	20
Atlético Goianiense	10	5	7	6	3	3	2	5	7	9	10	10	8	11	10	11	9	11	11	11	11	11	9	8	8	8	8	8	7	6	5	3	3	3	4	4	5	4
Avaí	19	12	12	16	10	14	15	16	17	18	18	19	18	18	19	19	20	19	18	18	18	16	16	15	15	16	15	16	16	16	15	15	13	13	13	13	13	13
Botafogo-SP	5	4	3	5	6	5	7	4	6	7	9	9	11	10	8	10	11	10	9	9	9	10	11	11	12	12	12	12	12	12	12	12	12	12	12	12	12	12
Ceará	17	20	13	15	16	13	11	9	10	8	7	7	7	9	11	9	10	8	10	10	10	9	10	10	11	10	10	10	11	11	11	11	11	11	11	11	11	11
Chapecoense	16	6	8	10	11	8	12	13	16	16	17	17	17	16	17	16	17	17	17	17	17	19	19	17	16	15	17	17	17	17	17	17	17	18	18	17	18	16
CRB	11	16	19	19	19	15	18	18	19	17	14	14	14	14	13	12	12	13	12	12	12	12	12	12	10	9	9	9	9	10	9	10	10	10	10	10	9	9
Criciúma	3	3	4	1	1	2	4	3	4	4	5	4	6	5	3	2	2	3	5	6	4	5	4	5	3	4	6	5	6	7	7	8	6	4	2	2	2	3
Guarani	1	1	2	3	5	4	5	6	8	11	11	11	9	7	9	8	8	6	6	5	6	6	7	7	7	6	3	2	5	4	4	5	5	7	8	9	10	10
Ituano	4	11	11	8	9	11	14	15	13	13	13	13	13	13	12	14	14	14	14	14	13	14	14	13	13	13	13	13	14	13	14	14	14	14	15	14	14	14
Juventude	13	17	18	14	18	19	16	12	11	10	8	8	10	8	7	7	7	9	8	8	5	7	5	6	4	5	7	6	4	3	3	4	4	5	3	3	3	2
Londrina	7	13	14	13	17	12	10	11	14	14	16	16	16	17	18	18	18	18	19	19	19	18	18	19	19	19	19	19	19	19	19	19	19	19	19	19	19	19
Mirassol	8	10	5	9	8	7	6	8	5	5	6	5	5	6	6	6	6	7	7	7	8	8	8	9	9	11	11	11	10	9	8	7	8	9	7	8	7	6
Novorizontino	14	9	10	7	7	10	9	7	2	3	3	1	1	2	4	4	5	4	2	1	3	3	3	3	5	3	4	4	3	5	6	6	7	6	6	7	6	5
Ponte Preta	20	18	17	12	13	17	17	17	15	15	15	15	15	15	14	13	13	12	13	13	14	13	13	14	14	14	14	14	15	15	16	16	16	16	17	15	16	15
Sampaio Corrêa	9	14	16	17	12	16	13	14	12	12	12	12	12	12	15	15	15	15	15	15	15	15	15	16	17	17	16	15	13	14	13	13	15	15	16	18	15	17
Sport	12	15	15	18	14	9	8	10	9	6	4	6	2	4	1	3	3	5	4	3	2	1	1	2	2	2	2	3	2	2	2	2	2	2	5	5	8	7
Tombense	18	7	9	11	15	18	19	19	18	19	19	18	19	19	16	17	16	16	16	16	16	17	17	18	18	18	18	18	18	18	18	18	18	17	14	16	17	18
Vila Nova	6	8	6	4	4	6	3	2	3	2	2	3	3	1	2	1	1	2	3	4	7	4	6	4	6	7	5	7	8	8	10	9	9	8	9	6	4	8
Vitória	2	2	1	2	2	1	1	1	1	1	1	2	4	3	5	5	4	1	1	2	1	2	2	1	1	1	1	1	1	1	1	1	1	1	1	1	1	1

Champions, promoted to Campeonato Brasileiro Série A
Promotion to Campeonato Brasileiro Série A
Relegation to Campeonato Brasileiro Série C

Source: CBF

== Results ==
Home \ Away	ABC	ATL	AVA	BSP	CEA	CHA	CRB	CRI	GUA	ITU	JUV	LON	MIR	NOV	PON	SAM	SPO	TOM	VIL	VIT
ABC	—	1–1	1–1	1–2	1–2	1–1	1–2	0–1	0–1	1–1	0–0	0–0	1–2	0–1	2–0	1–1	0–1	1–0	3–2	0–3
Atlético Goianiense	3–1	—	0–0	1–1	0–3	2–1	2–1	3–1	3–0	1–0	3–0	2–1	2–2	2–2	1–0	2–2	3–1	3–2	1–1	0–0
Avaí	0–2	0–2	—	1–1	1–0	1–4	1–1	1–0	1–2	0–0	0–2	0–0	1–0	1–0	0–1	2–0	2–2	4–2	0–3	1–1
Botafogo-SP	0–0	1–0	0–1	—	2–2	1–2	2–0	1–0	1–0	0–2	0–2	0–1	1–0	2–0	0–0	1–0	1–1	0–0	0–3	0–3
Ceará	1–0	0–1	0–0	3–0	—	2–0	1–3	1–0	0–3	1–1	1–3	3–1	2–0	0–3	1–1	0–0	2–1	2–0	1–0	0–2
Chapecoense	0–0	0–1	0–0	2–0	1–1	—	2–1	1–1	0–1	1–0	0–2	3–0	0–1	1–1	1–1	0–1	1–1	1–2	0–1	3–1
CRB	1–1	2–1	1–1	0–0	2–0	3–2	—	0–1	1–0	2–2	1–2	2–1	2–0	1–0	1–0	0–0	2–0	2–0	0–3	6–0
Criciúma	1–0	3–0	1–0	3–0	1–2	1–2	2–1	—	1–1	2–1	0–1	2–0	2–1	0–1	2–1	3–0	1–0	2–0	1–0	1–0
Guarani	2–3	1–0	4–1	0–1	0–0	3–3	0–1	1–1	—	1–0	0–1	2–1	2–1	2–1	1–0	2–0	3–1	3–0	1–1	2–0
Ituano	3–0	1–1	0–1	1–1	2–0	0–0	0–0	3–0	1–1	—	1–1	3–1	0–0	0–2	0–1	2–1	1–1	1–0	1–2	0–2
Juventude	1–1	3–0	3–2	1–2	1–0	0–0	3–1	1–0	1–0	2–1	—	2–2	0–1	1–0	0–0	0–0	2–2	1–2	0–2	1–0
Londrina	1–0	0–2	1–1	1–2	1–3	1–1	1–1	1–1	0–0	2–2	1–2	—	1–2	0–1	3–0	1–0	1–2	1–1	1–0	2–0
Mirassol	3–2	4–1	2–2	1–0	1–1	1–0	1–0	1–0	0–0	0–1	0–1	2–0	—	0–2	1–0	0–0	2–1	2–0	1–1	2–0
Novorizontino	2–1	2–2	2–0	0–1	4–1	1–2	0–1	2–0	1–0	2–0	1–0	3–0	2–1	—	2–0	1–0	0–0	0–0	3–1	1–2
Ponte Preta	0–0	0–2	0–1	2–0	0–0	1–0	3–0	1–2	1–1	0–0	0–0	1–0	0–3	1–0	—	0–0	1–1	0–1	1–0	2–2
Sampaio Corrêa	1–0	3–3	4–0	0–0	1–1	2–0	1–1	0–2	1–1	0–0	2–1	2–0	1–3	1–1	0–0	—	1–2	1–2	2–1	0–1
Sport	4–1	0–0	2–1	3–0	2–0	2–1	2–0	3–3	2–0	1–2	3–0	4–0	0–0	1–0	3–3	4–1	—	3–2	1–0	1–2
Tombense	3–0	1–1	0–1	0–0	2–2	4–2	2–1	2–2	1–1	3–0	1–1	0–2	0–1	1–2	0–1	0–1	0–0	—	2–1	1–2
Vila Nova	1–1	2–1	1–1	3–1	3–1	0–0	0–1	0–0	0–0	1–0	1–0	4–1	2–0	2–1	1–1	3–0	0–1	1–0	—	1–0
Vitória	2–0	2–3	3–0	2–0	1–0	1–0	1–0	0–1	2–0	3–0	0–0	2–0	0–0	2–1	3–0	2–1	1–0	1–0	1–1	—

Source: CBF
Legend: Blue = home team win; Yellow = draw; Red = away team win.

== Top goalscorers ==
Rank	Player	Club	Goals
1	(Brazil) Gustavo Coutinho	Atlético Goianiense	14
2	(Brazil) Ytalo	Sampaio Corrêa	13
3	(Brazil) Vágner Love	Sport	11
4	(Brazil) Caio Dantas	Vila Nova	10
4	(Brazil) Derek	Guarani	10
4	(Brazil) Erick	Ceará	10
4	(Brazil) Léo Gamalho	Vitória	10
8	(Brazil) Anselmo Ramon	CRB	9
8	(Italy) Éder	Criciúma	9
8	(Brazil) Fernandão	Tombense	9
8	(Brazil) Luiz Fernando	Atlético Goianiense	9

Source: CBF

== Attendances ==
EC Vitória drew the highest average home attendance in the 2023 edition of the Campeonato Brasileiro Série B.

#	Football club	Home games	Average attendance
1	EC Vitória	19	22,905
2	Sport Recife	19	17,703
3	Ceará SC	19	16,262
4	Criciúma EC	19	14,035
5	Vila Nova FC	19	8,770
6	Atlético Goianiense	19	6,758
7	Avai FC	19	6,690
8	Guarani FC	19	6,491
9	Juventude	19	5,808
10	Chapecoense	19	5,485
11	ABC Futebol Clube	19	4,979
12	Clube de Regatas Brasil	19	4,960
13	AA Ponte Preta	19	4,721
14	Sampaio Corrêa	19	4,235
15	Botafogo FC	19	3,179
16	Grêmio Novorizontino	19	2,637
17	Mirassol FC	19	2,358
18	Ituano FC	19	1,528
19	Londrina EC	19	916
20	Tombense	19	898
