= 2021 Campeonato Brasileiro Série B =

Football competition held in Brazil

Campeonato Brasileiro Série B
- Season: 2021
- Dates: 28 May – 28 November 2021
- Champions: Botafogo (2nd title)
- Promoted: Avaí; Botafogo; Coritiba; Goiás
- Relegated: Brasil de Pelotas; Confiança; Remo; Vitória
- Matches: 380
- Goals: 826 (2.17 per match)
- Top goalscorer: Edu (17 goals)
- Biggest home win: Náutico 5–0 Operário Ferroviário; R9, 2 July 2021
- Biggest away win: Náutico 0–4 Confiança; R16, 7 August 2021; Vasco da Gama 0–4 Botafogo; R34, 7 November 2021
- Highest scoring: 7 goals Operário Ferroviário 2–5 Guarani; R2, 1 June 2021; Cruzeiro 3–4 CRB; R2, 6 June 2021; Brusque 4–3 Náutico; R33, 2 November 2021
- Longest winning run: 5 games Botafogo; Coritiba; Náutico
- Longest unbeaten run: 14 games Náutico
- Longest winless run: 16 games Brasil de Pelotas
- Longest losing run: 6 games Brasil de Pelotas; Confiança
- Highest attendance: 57,592; Cruzeiro 0–0 Náutico; R38, 25 November
- Lowest attendance: 83; Londrina 3–1 Sampaio Corrêa; R28, 3 October
- Total attendance: 598,279
- Average attendance: 4,399

The 2021 Campeonato Brasileiro Série B was a football competition held in Brazil, equivalent to the second division. The competition began on 28 May and ended on 28 November.

Twenty teams competed in the tournament, twelve returning from the 2020 season, four promoted from the 2020 Campeonato Brasileiro Série C (Brusque, Londrina, Remo and Vila Nova), and four relegated from the 2020 Campeonato Brasileiro Série A (Botafogo, Coritiba, Goiás and Vasco da Gama).

Brusque were deducted three points after they were punished by Superior Tribunal de Justiça Desportiva (STJD) for racial abuse aimed toward Londrina's player Celsinho during the match Brusque v Londrina, played on 28 August (21st round). Brusque also were sanctioned with a fine of R$60,000. On 18 November 2021, STJD overturned its decision and the three points were returned to Brusque.

The top four teams were promoted to the 2022 Campeonato Brasileiro Série A. Botafogo and Coritiba became the first two clubs to be promoted on 15 November 2021 after a 2–1 win against Operário Ferroviário and a 1–0 Brusque win against CRB, respectively. Goiás were promoted on 22 November 2021 and Avaí on 28 November 2021.

== Teams ==
Location of teams in 2021 Série B

Pos.	Relegated from 2020 Série A
17th	Vasco da Gama
18th	Goiás
19th	Coritiba
20th	Botafogo

Pos.	Promoted from 2020 Série C
1st	Vila Nova
2nd	Remo
3rd	Londrina
4th	Brusque

=== Number of teams by state ===
Number of teams	State	Team(s)
3	Paraná	Coritiba, Londrina and Operário Ferroviário
2	Alagoas	CRB and CSA
2	Goiás	Goiás and Vila Nova
2	Rio de Janeiro	Botafogo and Vasco da Gama
2	Santa Catarina	Avaí and Brusque
2	São Paulo	Guarani and Ponte Preta
1	Bahia	Vitória
1	Maranhão	Sampaio Corrêa
1	Minas Gerais	Cruzeiro
1	Pará	Remo
1	Pernambuco	Náutico
1	Rio Grande do Sul	Brasil de Pelotas
1	Sergipe	Confiança

== Venues ==
Team	Home city	Stadium	Capacity
Avaí	Florianópolis	Ressacada	17,826
Botafogo	Rio de Janeiro	Olímpico Nilton Santos	45,000
Botafogo	Rio de Janeiro	Raulino de Oliveira (Volta Redonda)	20,255
Brasil de Pelotas	Pelotas	Bento Freitas	18,000
Brusque	Brusque	Augusto Bauer	5,000
Confiança	Aracaju	Batistão	15,586
Coritiba	Curitiba	Couto Pereira	40,502
CRB	Maceió	Rei Pelé	17,126
Cruzeiro	Belo Horizonte	Mineirão	61,846
Cruzeiro	Belo Horizonte	Independência	23,018
Cruzeiro	Belo Horizonte	Arena do Jacaré (Sete Lagoas)	22,000
CSA	Maceió	Rei Pelé	17,126
Goiás	Goiânia	Serrinha	6,300
Guarani	Campinas	Brinco de Ouro	29,130
Londrina	Londrina	Estádio do Café	31,000
Náutico	Recife	Aflitos	22,856
Náutico	Recife	Arena Pernambuco (São Lourenço da Mata)	44,300
Operário Ferroviário	Ponta Grossa	Germano Krüger	10,632
Operário Ferroviário	Ponta Grossa	Couto Pereira (Curitiba)	40,502
Ponte Preta	Campinas	Moisés Lucarelli	19,728
Remo	Belém	Baenão	12,000
Sampaio Corrêa	São Luís	Castelão	40,149
Vasco da Gama	Rio de Janeiro	São Januário	24,584
Vila Nova	Goiânia	Onésio Brasileiro Alvarenga	6,500
Vila Nova	Goiânia	Annibal Batista de Toledo (Aparecida de Goiânia)	6,645
Vitória	Salvador	Barradão	35,000

== Personnel and kits ==
Team	Manager	Kit manufacturer	Main kit sponsor
Avaí	(Brazil) Claudinei Oliveira	(England) Umbro	(Curaçao) PixBet
Botafogo	(Brazil) Enderson Moreira	(Italy) Kappa	(Costa Rica) Estrela Bet
Brasil de Pelotas	(Brazil) Jerson Testoni	(Brazil) Xavante (Club manufactured kit)	(Brazil) Banrisul
Brusque	(Brazil) Waguinho Dias	(Brazil) BFC87 (Club manufactured kit)	(Brazil) HAVAN
Confiança	(Brazil) Luizinho Lopes	(Brazil) WA Sport	(Brazil) Banese
Coritiba	(Paraguay) Gustavo Morínigo	(Brazil) 1909 (Club manufactured kit)	(Switzerland) Neodent
CRB	(Brazil) Allan Aal	(Brazil) Regatas (Club manufactured kit)	(Brazil) O Corpo Explica
Cruzeiro	(Brazil) Vanderlei Luxemburgo	(Germany) Adidas	(Brazil) Supermercados BH
CSA	(Brazil) Mozart	(Brazil) Volt Sport	(Brazil) Carajás
Goiás	(Brazil) Glauber Ramos (caretaker)	(Brazil) Gr33n (Club manufactured kit)	(Curaçao) PixBet
Guarani	(Brazil) Daniel Paulista	(Italy) Kappa	(Brazil) Asa Alumínio
Londrina	(Brazil) Márcio Fernandes	(Brazil) Karilu	(Brazil) PADO
Náutico	(Brazil) Hélio dos Anjos	(Brazil) N Seis (Club manufactured kit)	(Curaçao) JogueFácil.bet
Operário Ferroviário	(Brazil) Ricardo Catalá	(Brazil) Karilu	(Brazil) Philco
Ponte Preta	(Brazil) Gilson Kleina	(Brazil) 1900 (Club manufactured kit)	(Curaçao) PixBet
Remo	(Brazil) Eduardo Baptista	(Brazil) Volt Sport	(Brazil) Banpará
Sampaio Corrêa	(Brazil) João Brigatti	(Brazil) Super Bolla	(Brazil) Governo do Maranhão
Vasco da Gama	(Brazil) Fábio Cortez (caretaker)	(Italy) Kappa	(Curaçao) PixBet
Vila Nova	(Brazil) Higo Magalhães (caretaker)	(Brazil) V43 (Club manufactured kit)	(Brazil) Rizzo Imobiliária
Vitória	(Japan) Wagner Lopes	(Brazil) Nego (Club manufactured kit)	(Curaçao) Casa de Apostas

=== Managerial changes ===
Team	Outgoing manager	Manner of departure	Date of vacancy	Position in table	Incoming manager	Date of appointment	Ref.
Cruzeiro	(Brazil) Célio Lúcio	End of caretaker tenure	29 January 2021	Pre-season	(Brazil) Felipe Conceição	30 January 2021	
Guarani	(Brazil) Felipe Conceição	Resigned	29 January 2021	Pre-season	(Brazil) Allan Aal	4 February 2021	
Sampaio Corrêa	(Brazil) Léo Condé	End of contract	29 January 2021	Pre-season	(Brazil) Rafael Guanaes	5 February 2021	
Botafogo	(Brazil) Lúcio Flávio	End of caretaker tenure	26 February 2021	Pre-season	(Brazil) Marcelo Chamusca	26 February 2021	
Vasco da Gama	(Brazil) Vanderlei Luxemburgo	End of contract	26 February 2021	Pre-season	(Brazil) Marcelo Cabo	27 February 2021	
Vila Nova	(Brazil) Márcio Fernandes	Sacked	5 March 2021	Pre-season	(Japan) Wagner Lopes	8 March 2021	
Londrina	(Brazil) Silvinho Canuto	Sacked	21 March 2021	Pre-season	(Brazil) Roberto Fonseca	29 March 2021	
Goiás	(Brazil) Augusto César	Sacked	12 April 2021	Pre-season	(Brazil) Pintado	26 April 2021	
CSA	(Brazil) Mozart	Resigned	18 April 2021	Pre-season	(Brazil) Bruno Pivetti	26 April 2021	
Sampaio Corrêa	(Brazil) Rafael Guanaes	Sacked	22 April 2021	Pre-season	(Portugal) Daniel Neri	29 April 2021	
Confiança	(Brazil) Daniel Paulista	Mutual agreement	10 May 2021	Pre-season	(Brazil) Rodrigo Santana	12 May 2021	
Guarani	(Brazil) Allan Aal	Sacked	18 May 2021	Pre-season	(Brazil) Daniel Paulista	23 May 2021	
Ponte Preta	(Brazil) Fábio Moreno	Back to coordinator role	22 May 2021	Pre-season	(Brazil) Gilson Kleina (Note: Sandro Forner was the caretaker manager on the 1st round against Brusque)	28 May 2021	
CRB	(Brazil) Roberto Fernandes	Sacked	24 May 2021	Pre-season	(Brazil) Allan Aal	24 May 2021	
Sampaio Corrêa	(Portugal) Daniel Neri	Mutual agreement	27 May 2021	Pre-season	(Brazil) Felipe Surian	27 May 2021	
Vitória	(Brazil) Rodrigo Chagas	Sacked	8 June 2021	14th	(Brazil) Ramon Menezes	8 June 2021	
Cruzeiro	(Brazil) Felipe Conceição	Sacked	9 June 2021	20th	(Brazil) Mozart	10 June 2021	
Vila Nova	(Japan) Wagner Lopes	Sacked	24 June 2021	16th	(Brazil) Hemerson Maria (Note: Higo Magalhães was the caretaker manager from the 7th until the 17th round, in matches against Goiás, Operário Ferroviário, Ponte Preta, Remo, Brasil de Pelotas, CRB, Brusque, Cruzeiro, Guarani, Sampaio Corrêa and Vasco da Gama)	11 August 2021	
Remo	(Brazil) Paulo Bonamigo	Resigned	30 June 2021	16th	(Brazil) Felipe Conceição (Note: João Neto was the caretaker manager on the 9th round against Coritiba)	1 July 2021	
CSA	(Brazil) Bruno Pivetti	Mutual agreement	4 July 2021	14th	(Brazil) Ney Franco (Note: Adriano Rodrigues was the caretaker manager on the 10th round against Brusque)	9 July 2021	
Londrina	(Brazil) Roberto Fonseca	Mutual agreement	10 July 2021	19th	(Brazil) Márcio Fernandes (Note: Edison Borges was the caretaker manager on the 11th round against Operário Ferroviário)	14 July 2021	
Botafogo	(Brazil) Marcelo Chamusca	Sacked	13 July 2021	11th	(Brazil) Enderson Moreira (Note: Ricardo Resende was the caretaker manager on the 12th and 13th rounds, against Brusque and Goiás, respectively)	20 July 2021	
Goiás	(Brazil) Pintado	Sacked	18 July 2021	4th	(Brazil) Marcelo Cabo (Note: Glauber Ramos was the caretaker manager on the 13th round against Botafogo)	20 July 2021	
Vasco da Gama	(Brazil) Marcelo Cabo	Sacked	19 July 2021	8th	(Brazil) Lisca (Note: Alexandre Gomes was the caretaker manager on the 13th round against CSA)	20 July 2021	
Confiança	(Brazil) Rodrigo Santana	Sacked	26 July 2021	20th	(Brazil) Luizinho Lopes (Note: Zé Carlos was the caretaker manager from the 15th until the 20th rounds, against Brusque, Náutico, CSA, Ponte Preta, Remo and Cruzeiro)	23 August 2021	
Brasil de Pelotas	(Brazil) Cláudio Tencati	Sacked	29 July 2021	16th	(Brazil) Cléber Gaúcho (Note: Cirilo was the caretaker manager on the 15th round against Sampaio Corrêa)	31 July 2021	
Cruzeiro	(Brazil) Mozart	Resigned	30 July 2021	16th	(Brazil) Vanderlei Luxemburgo	3 August 2021	
Vitória	(Brazil) Ramon Menezes	Sacked	5 August 2021	15th	(Japan) Wagner Lopes (Note: Ricardo Amadeu was the caretaker manager on the 16th and 17th rounds, against Vasco da Gama and Cruzeiro, respectively)	13 August 2021	
Náutico	(Brazil) Hélio dos Anjos	Resigned	18 August 2021	6th	(Brazil) Marcelo Chamusca	18 August 2021	
Vila Nova	(Brazil) Hemerson Maria	Resigned	23 August 2021	17th	(Brazil) Higo Magalhães (caretaker) (Note: Caretaker manager until the end of the tournament)	23 August 2021	
CSA	(Brazil) Ney Franco	Sacked	30 August 2021	11th	(Brazil) Mozart	30 August 2021	
Vasco da Gama	(Brazil) Lisca	Resigned	8 September 2021	9th	(Brazil) Fernando Diniz	9 September 2021	
Brusque	(Brazil) Jerson Testoni	Resigned	9 September 2021	13th	(Brazil) Waguinho Dias	12 September 2021	
Náutico	(Brazil) Marcelo Chamusca	Mutual agreement	22 September 2021	8th	(Brazil) Hélio dos Anjos (Note: Marcelo Rocha was the caretaker manager on the 26th round against Remo)	23 September 2021	
Brasil de Pelotas	(Brazil) Cléber Gaúcho	Sacked	22 September 2021	20th	(Brazil) Jerson Testoni (Note: Cirilo was the caretaker manager on the 26th round against Ponte Preta)	27 September 2021	
Operário Ferroviário	(Brazil) Matheus Costa	Sacked	29 September 2021	12th	(Brazil) Ricardo Catalá (Note: Leandro Niehues was the caretaker manager on the 28th round against Náutico)	1 October 2021	
Goiás	(Brazil) Marcelo Cabo	Sacked	28 October 2021	4th	(Brazil) Glauber Ramos (caretaker)	28 October 2021	
Sampaio Corrêa	(Brazil) Felipe Surian	Sacked	29 October 2021	13th	(Brazil) João Brigatti	30 October 2021	
Remo	(Brazil) Felipe Conceição	Mutual agreement	10 November 2021	15th	(Brazil) Eduardo Baptista	11 November 2021	
Vasco da Gama	(Brazil) Fernando Diniz	Sacked	11 November 2021	9th	(Brazil) Fábio Cortez (caretaker)	11 November 2021	

=== Foreign players ===
The clubs could have a maximum of five foreign players in their Campeonato Brasileiro squads per match, but there was no limit of foreigners in the clubs' squads.

Club	Player 1	Player 2	Player 3	Player 4
Avaí	(Colombia) Jonathan Copete			
Botafogo	(Paraguay) Gatito Fernández	(Argentina) Joel Carli	(Uruguay) Federico Barrandeguy	
Brasil de Pelotas				
Brusque				
Confiança	(Paraguay) Nery Bareiro			
Coritiba				
CRB	(Argentina) Diego Torres	(Belarus) Renan Bressan^{dn}		
Cruzeiro	(Paraguay) Raúl Cáceres	(Bolivia) Marcelo Moreno^{dn}	(Argentina) Ariel Cabral	(Italy) Rômulo^{dn}
CSA				
Goiás				
Guarani				
Londrina	(Colombia) Elacio Córdoba			
Náutico	(Paraguay) Jorge Colmán	(Paraguay) Guillermo Paiva	(Ecuador) Jacob Murillo	
Operário Ferroviário	(Bolivia) Thomaz^{dn}			
Ponte Preta				
Remo				
Sampaio Corrêa				
Vasco da Gama	(Argentina) Germán Cano	(Paraguay) Matías Galarza	(Argentina) Martín Sarrafiore	(Ecuador) Jhon Sánchez
Vila Nova	(Argentina) Nicolás Maná			
Vitória	(Uruguay) Pablo Siles			

(dn) = Player holding Brazilian dual nationality.

== League table ==
Pos	Team	Pld	W	D	L	GF	GA	GD	Pts	Promotion or relegation
1	Botafogo (C, P)	38	20	10	8	56	31	+25	70	Promotion to 2022 Campeonato Brasileiro Série A
2	Goiás (P)	38	17	14	7	48	31	+17	65	Promotion to 2022 Campeonato Brasileiro Série A
3	Coritiba (P)	38	18	10	10	49	35	+14	64	Promotion to 2022 Campeonato Brasileiro Série A
4	Avaí (P)	38	18	10	10	44	35	+9	64	Promotion to 2022 Campeonato Brasileiro Série A
5	CSA	38	18	8	12	48	33	+15	62	
6	Guarani	38	16	12	10	54	41	+13	60	
7	CRB	38	16	12	10	47	39	+8	60	
8	Náutico	38	14	11	13	50	50	0	53	
9	Vila Nova	38	12	15	11	35	36	−1	51	
10	Vasco da Gama	38	13	10	15	43	52	−9	49	
11	Ponte Preta	38	12	13	13	39	40	−1	49	
12	Operário Ferroviário	38	13	9	16	35	46	−11	48	
13	Brusque	38	13	9	16	44	56	−12	48	
14	Cruzeiro	38	10	18	10	42	44	−2	48	
15	Sampaio Corrêa	38	12	11	15	41	42	−1	47	
16	Londrina	38	11	11	16	31	41	−10	44	
17	Remo (R)	38	11	10	17	31	42	−11	43	Relegation to 2022 Campeonato Brasileiro Série C
18	Vitória (R)	38	8	16	14	31	32	−1	40	Relegation to 2022 Campeonato Brasileiro Série C
19	Confiança (R)	38	9	10	19	35	48	−13	37	Relegation to 2022 Campeonato Brasileiro Série C
20	Brasil de Pelotas (R)	38	4	11	23	23	52	−29	23	Relegation to 2022 Campeonato Brasileiro Série C

Source: CBF
Rules for classification: 1) points; 2) wins; 3) goal difference; 4) goals scored; 5) head-to-head results (only between 2 teams); 6) fewest red cards; 7) fewest yellow cards; 8) drawing of lots.
(C) Champions; (P) Promoted; (R) Relegated

=== Positions by round ===
The table lists the positions of teams after each week of matches. In order to preserve chronological evolvements, any postponed matches were not included to the round at which they were originally scheduled, but added to the full round they were played immediately afterwards.

Team ╲ Round	1	2	3	4	5	6	7	8	9	10	11	12	13	14	15	16	17	18	19	20	21	22	23	24	25	26	27	28	29	30	31	32	33	34	35	36	37	38
Avaí	20	19	20	13	16	18	14	10	11	12	9	7	5	7	4	5	9	5	3	4	8	8	5	6	6	5	4	2	3	4	3	3	3	3	3	5	4	4
Botafogo	8	4	3	3	4	9	10	7	9	10	12	13	14	12	9	8	10	8	8	5	4	3	3	3	3	2	2	3	2	2	2	2	2	1	1	1	1	1
Brasil de Pelotas	13	15	17	18	12	16	18	19	17	18	19	15	16	16	19	20	20	20	20	20	19	19	19	20	20	20	20	20	20	20	20	20	20	20	20	20	20	20
Brusque	4	1	2	2	3	5	7	5	7	9	11	10	8	9	6	10	11	12	13	13	13	13	14	14	15	17	16	16	16	14	16	16	16	16	16	14	11	13
Confiança	1	8	13	12	17	12	12	15	15	15	16	17	18	20	20	16	18	19	19	19	20	20	20	19	19	19	19	19	19	19	19	19	19	18	19	19	19	19
Coritiba	3	9	9	11	8	4	2	2	2	2	2	2	2	2	2	2	1	1	1	1	1	1	1	1	1	1	1	1	1	1	1	1	1	2	2	2	2	3
CRB	7	6	4	5	10	6	8	8	5	4	8	4	6	3	5	3	2	2	4	2	3	2	4	4	4	4	3	5	5	5	5	5	5	6	5	6	5	7
Cruzeiro	18	20	19	14	18	11	13	14	13	14	14	16	17	19	18	15	15	16	14	14	14	15	13	13	13	14	15	12	12	11	12	14	14	12	11	11	13	14
CSA	17	16	18	19	13	15	11	13	14	13	13	11	12	11	13	12	12	11	10	10	11	11	12	12	8	7	7	7	6	8	8	7	7	5	7	7	6	5
Goiás	14	5	5	4	6	2	3	3	4	6	4	5	4	4	3	4	7	3	2	3	2	4	2	2	2	3	5	4	4	3	4	4	4	4	4	3	3	2
Guarani	9	3	8	7	5	7	9	11	8	7	5	3	3	5	8	7	5	7	6	9	7	7	6	5	5	6	6	8	7	7	7	6	6	7	6	4	7	6
Londrina	15	17	15	16	19	19	15	16	19	19	20	20	20	18	17	19	19	17	17	16	17	18	18	18	18	16	17	17	17	17	17	17	17	17	17	17	17	16
Náutico	5	2	1	1	1	1	1	1	1	1	1	1	1	1	1	1	3	6	7	8	6	5	8	8	9	11	11	9	9	9	9	9	9	8	8	8	8	8
Operário Ferroviário	2	10	10	6	2	3	5	6	10	8	6	9	10	8	11	11	8	10	9	6	9	10	9	9	11	12	12	13	14	15	14	12	12	13	12	12	15	12
Ponte Preta	16	13	16	20	20	20	20	20	18	17	18	19	19	17	16	18	16	14	16	15	15	14	16	15	14	13	14	15	15	16	15	15	15	14	14	15	14	11
Remo	6	7	12	10	14	14	16	17	20	20	15	14	11	13	12	13	13	13	12	12	12	12	11	11	12	9	9	10	11	12	13	11	11	15	15	16	16	17
Sampaio Corrêa	12	12	7	8	7	8	4	4	3	3	3	6	7	10	7	6	4	4	5	7	5	6	7	7	7	10	10	11	10	10	10	13	13	11	10	10	12	15
Vasco da Gama	19	18	11	15	9	10	6	9	6	5	7	8	9	6	10	9	6	9	11	11	10	9	10	10	10	8	8	6	8	6	6	8	8	9	9	9	9	10
Vila Nova	11	11	6	9	15	17	19	12	12	11	10	12	13	14	14	14	14	15	15	17	16	16	15	16	16	15	13	14	13	13	11	10	10	10	13	13	10	9
Vitória	10	14	14	17	11	13	17	18	16	16	17	18	15	15	15	17	17	18	18	18	18	17	17	17	17	18	18	18	18	18	18	18	18	19	18	18	18	18

Champions, promoted to Campeonato Brasileiro Série A
Promotion to Campeonato Brasileiro Série A
Relegation to Campeonato Brasileiro Série C

Source: CBF

== Results ==
Home \ Away	AVA	BOT	BRA	BRU	CON	COR	CRB	CRU	CSA	GOI	GUA	LON	NAU	OPE	PON	REM	SAM	VAS	VIL	VIT
Avaí	—	1–1	1–1	1–2	2–1	1–2	1–0	1–0	1–1	1–0	0–1	2–0	2–0	1–0	1–1	1–0	2–1	3–1	1–1	1–1
Botafogo	1–2	—	1–0	3–0	1–0	2–0	2–0	3–3	2–0	0–2	2–2	4–0	3–1	2–1	2–0	3–0	2–0	2–0	3–2	1–0
Brasil de Pelotas	0–1	0–1	—	0–2	1–1	0–2	0–1	0–0	0–1	2–1	0–1	0–0	3–2	1–0	1–1	1–1	1–2	1–2	2–2	1–0
Brusque	0–0	2–1	1–0	—	3–0	0–0	1–0	1–2	2–3	0–1	2–0	0–0	4–3	2–0	2–1	3–1	0–0	0–1	2–3	0–0
Confiança	3–1	0–1	1–1	3–2	—	0–1	1–2	3–1	0–2	1–2	1–4	0–2	0–0	1–0	0–1	1–2	2–0	1–2	1–0	1–1
Coritiba	2–0	0–1	2–1	4–0	1–1	—	1–1	0–3	0–1	1–1	1–0	1–1	3–1	3–1	2–0	2–1	3–0	1–1	1–0	1–0
CRB	1–2	2–1	2–1	3–0	3–2	1–1	—	0–0	0–0	0–1	2–2	1–0	1–1	0–0	1–1	2–2	1–0	1–1	2–1	3–1
Cruzeiro	0–3	0–0	2–0	2–0	1–0	0–0	3–4	—	1–2	1–1	3–3	2–2	0–0	1–1	1–0	1–3	1–1	2–1	1–1	2–2
CSA	0–0	2–0	4–0	4–1	0–0	3–0	0–1	2–1	—	0–1	1–1	1–0	0–1	2–4	2–1	2–0	0–0	2–2	1–1	2–1
Goiás	3–0	1–1	2–1	2–2	2–0	2–1	1–0	1–1	3–1	—	2–1	0–0	0–1	1–0	2–2	1–1	2–2	1–0	1–2	3–0
Guarani	4–0	1–1	2–0	4–1	1–2	0–2	1–0	1–1	1–0	0–2	—	3–0	1–3	3–0	1–0	2–0	0–0	1–0	1–4	1–1
Londrina	1–3	2–2	0–0	0–1	0–0	2–3	0–2	0–1	0–2	0–0	0–1	—	0–0	1–2	2–1	1–0	3–1	3–0	1–0	1–0
Náutico	1–2	3–1	2–1	1–1	0–4	2–1	1–3	0–1	1–0	3–2	1–1	1–2	—	5–0	1–1	1–1	2–1	2–2	2–0	1–1
Operário Ferroviário	2–1	1–0	2–1	1–1	0–0	1–0	2–1	2–1	0–2	1–1	2–5	0–0	1–2	—	1–2	2–1	1–0	2–0	1–2	0–1
Ponte Preta	0–0	0–0	1–0	3–0	4–2	3–2	1–0	0–1	2–1	2–1	0–0	2–1	2–3	0–0	—	1–2	3–2	1–1	1–1	0–0
Remo	2–1	0–1	1–0	2–1	0–0	0–0	1–2	1–0	1–0	0–1	0–0	0–1	1–0	0–1	0–1	—	0–2	2–1	0–1	0–0
Sampaio Corrêa	0–2	2–0	2–1	2–2	3–1	2–3	2–3	1–1	2–0	0–0	0–1	1–0	2–0	0–0	1–0	1–1	—	1–0	3–0	0–1
Vasco da Gama	0–2	0–4	1–1	2–1	1–0	2–1	3–0	1–1	1–3	2–0	4–1	1–2	1–1	0–2	2–0	2–2	1–0	—	1–0	0–3
Vila Nova	1–0	1–1	0–0	0–1	0–0	0–1	0–0	0–0	1–0	0–0	2–2	2–1	1–0	2–1	0–0	1–0	0–2	2–2	—	0–0
Vitória	0–0	0–0	4–0	3–1	0–1	0–0	1–1	3–0	0–1	1–1	1–0	1–2	0–1	0–0	1–0	1–2	2–2	0–1	0–1	—

Source: CBF
Legend: Blue = home team win; Yellow = draw; Red = away team win.

== Top goalscorers ==
Rank	Player	Club	Goals
1	(Brazil) Edu	Brusque	17
2	(Brazil) Léo Gamalho	Coritiba	16
3	(Brazil) Rafael Navarro	Botafogo	15
4	(Brazil) Dellatorre	CSA	12
5	(Brazil) Bruno Sávio	Guarani	11
5	(Argentina) Germán Cano	Vasco da Gama	11
5	(Brazil) Jean Carlos	Náutico	11
8	(Brazil) Alef Manga	Goiás	10
8	(Brazil) Iury	CSA	10
10	(Brazil) Ciel	Sampaio Corrêa	9
10	(Brazil) Marco Antônio	Botafogo	9
10	(Brazil) Paulo Sérgio	Operário Ferroviário	9
10	(Brazil) Régis	Guarani	9
10	(Brazil) Waguininho	Coritiba	9

Source: CBF

== Awards ==
Month	Player of the month		Ref.
Month	Player	Club	Ref.
June	(Brazil) Jean Carlos	Náutico	
July	(Brazil) Jean Carlos	Náutico	
August	(Brazil) Chay	Botafogo	
September	(Brazil) Nenê	Vasco da Gama	
October	(Brazil) Rafael Navarro	Botafogo	
