= Enderson Moreira =

Brazilian football manager (born 1971)

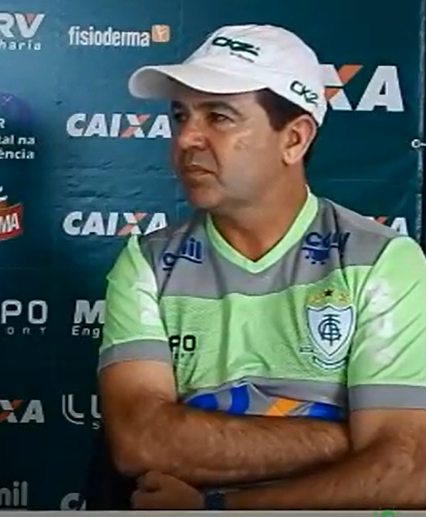
- Moreira in 2017

Personal information
- Full name: Enderson Alves Moreira
- Date of birth: 28 September 1971 (age 55)
- Place of birth: Belo Horizonte, Brazil

Team information
- Current team: Novorizontino (head coach)

Managerial career
- Years: Team
- 1996–1998: América Mineiro (youth)
- 1998–1999: Sete de Setembro
- 1999–2000: Santa Tereza
- 2000–2004: América Mineiro (youth)
- 2004–2005: Atlético Mineiro (youth)
- 2006–2007: Cruzeiro (youth)
- 2008: Ipatinga (assistant)
- 2008–2009: Ipatinga
- 2009: América Mineiro (youth)
- 2009: América Mineiro (interim)
- 2009: Atlético Paranaense (youth)
- 2010–2011: Internacional B
- 2011: Fluminense (assistant)
- 2011: Fluminense (interim)
- 2011–2013: Goiás
- 2014: Grêmio
- 2014–2015: Santos
- 2015: Atlético Paranaense
- 2015: Fluminense
- 2016: Goiás
- 2016–2018: América Mineiro
- 2018–2019: Bahia
- 2019: Ceará
- 2020: Ceará
- 2020: Cruzeiro
- 2020: Goiás
- 2021: Fortaleza
- 2021–2022: Botafogo
- 2022: Bahia
- 2023: Sport Recife
- 2024: Sporting Cristal
- 2024–2025: Avaí
- 2025: América Mineiro
- 2025–: Novorizontino

Enderson Alves Moreira (born 28 September 1971) is a Brazilian football coach, currently the head coach of Novorizontino.

== Coaching career ==
Born in Belo Horizonte, Minas Gerais, Moreira had a Physical Education graduation before joining América Mineiro's youth setup in 1995, as a fitness coach. In 1996, after being appointed head coach of the under-20s, he led the side to the first Copa São Paulo de Futebol Júnior title of their history. Moreira later was in charge of local lower clubs, and after another stint at América, was appointed as Atlético Mineiro's under-20 head coach. He later moved to the latter's fierce rivals Cruzeiro, again finishing first in Copinha.

On 26 October 2008 Moreira was appointed Ipatinga head coach, after previously being the club's assistant. After failing to avoid relegation with the club, he subsequently returned to youth football.

On 23 December 2009, after a spell at Atlético Paranaense, Moreira was named head coach of Internacional's B-team. On 21 March 2011 he was appointed assistant coach at Fluminense, but acted as the club's interim for two months.

On 28 September 2011 Moreira was appointed at the helm of Goiás. He led the club to a Série B title in 2012, and also achieved an impressive sixth position in the following year's Série A, but opted to not renew his contract in December 2013.

On 16 December 2013 Moreira signed for Grêmio, but was relieved from his duties on 27 July 2014. On 3 September he was appointed Santos head coach, replacing fired Oswaldo de Oliveira.

On 5 March 2015 Moreira was sacked, despite the club's unbeaten status in the year. Eleven days later, he returned to Atlético Paranaense in the place of fired Claudinei Oliveira, now as head coach of the main squad, but was relieved from his duties on 20 April, after just eight matches.

On 21 May 2015 Moreira returned to Fluminense, after Ricardo Drubscky's dismissal. Dismissed on 15 September after a 1–4 heavy loss against Palmeiras, he returned to Goiás on 15 December ahead of the 2016 campaign.

Moreira was fired by the Esmeraldino on 8 June 2016, with the club in the relegation places. On 20 July he signed for América Mineiro, seriously threatened with relegation in the top tier; after improving the club's performance overall, he still failed to avoid the drop three matches before the end of the tournament.

In 2017, Moreira led América back to the Série A, after winning the Série B tournament. On 16 June 2018, he resigned from the club, and was announced after accepting an offer from fellow top division club Bahia.

On 1 April 2019, after being knocked out of the year's Copa do Nordeste, Moreira was dismissed by Bahia. Late in the month, he replaced fired Lisca at the helm of Ceará, but was himself sacked on 1 October.

On 10 February 2020, Moreira returned to Ceará, replacing sacked Argel Fucks, but resigned on 17 March to take over Cruzeiro the following day. He was relieved of his duties on 8 September, after a 1–1 home draw against CRB, and returned to Goiás on the 28th; his spell at the latter club also did not last long, as he was sacked on 17 November after ten winless matches.

On 7 January 2021, Moreira replaced Marcelo Chamusca at the helm of Fortaleza, still in the top tier. He was sacked on 25 April, after being knocked out of the 2021 Copa do Nordeste.

On 20 July 2021, Moreira again replaced Chamusca, now in charge of Botafogo. He led the club back to the top tier as champions, but was still sacked the following 11 February.

On 26 June 2022, Moreira returned to Bahia, in the place of sacked Guto Ferreira, but was himself dismissed on 1 October. On 18 November, he was named in charge of Sport Recife for the upcoming season.

Moreira left Sport on a mutual agreement on 19 November 2023, with the club having little options for a top-tier promotion. Five days later, he replaced compatriot Tiago Nunes at the helm of Peruvian side Sporting Cristal, but was sacked on 31 May 2024.

Moreira returned to Brazil on 5 August 2024, after taking over Avaí in the second division. He won the 2025 Campeonato Catarinense, but left the club by mutual consent on 25 March of that year, after his contract was due to expire.

On 2 June 2025, Moreira returned to América, but was sacked on 3 August. On 26 August, he replaced Umberto Louzer at the helm of fellow second division side Novorizontino.

== Managerial statistics ==
As of 13 October 2026

Managerial record by team and tenure
Team	Nat	From	To	Record								Ref
Team	Nat	From	To	G	W	D	L	GF	GA	GD	Win %	Ref
Ipatinga	(Brazil)	26 October 2008	22 February 2009	9	2	2	5	8	16	−8	22.22	
América Mineiro (interim)	(Brazil)	22 March 2009	11 April 2009	3	1	1	1	3	3	+0	33.33	
Fluminense (interim)	(Brazil)	25 March 2011	29 May 2011	12	7	2	3	20	15	+5	58.33	
Goiás	(Brazil)	28 September 2011	14 December 2013	149	84	35	30	267	155	+112	56.38	
Grêmio	(Brazil)	16 December 2013	27 July 2014	35	19	9	7	49	25	+24	54.29	
Santos	(Brazil)	3 September 2014	5 March 2015	31	16	6	9	48	31	+17	51.61	
Atlético Paranaense	(Brazil)	16 March 2015	20 April 2015	8	3	3	2	14	7	+7	37.50	
Fluminense	(Brazil)	21 May 2015	15 September 2015	26	11	4	11	29	31	−2	42.31	
Goiás	(Brazil)	15 December 2015	8 June 2016	27	13	7	7	36	26	+10	48.15	
América Mineiro	(Brazil)	20 July 2016	16 June 2018	111	43	32	36	112	110	+2	38.74	
Bahia	(Brazil)	16 June 2018	1 April 2019	59	22	19	18	74	45	+29	37.29	
Ceará	(Brazil)	22 April 2019	1 October 2019	22	6	5	11	22	23	−1	27.27	
Ceará	(Brazil)	10 February 2020	17 March 2020	10	6	4	0	16	7	+9	60.00	
Cruzeiro	(Brazil)	18 March 2020	8 September 2020	12	6	3	3	17	10	+7	50.00	
Goiás	(Brazil)	28 September 2020	17 November 2020	10	0	3	7	8	19	−11	0.00	
Fortaleza	(Brazil)	7 January 2021	25 April 2021	22	11	4	7	23	23	+0	50.00	
Botafogo	(Brazil)	23 July 2021	11 February 2022	31	20	7	4	50	18	+32	64.52	
Bahia	(Brazil)	26 June 2022	1 October 2022	18	6	6	6	20	18	+2	33.33	
Sport Recife	(Brazil)	18 November 2022	19 November 2023	68	39	17	12	124	59	+65	57.35	
Sporting Cristal	(Peru)	1 January 2024	31 May 2024	19	14	1	4	48	27	+21	73.68	
Avaí	(Brazil)	5 August 2024	25 March 2025	34	13	11	10	37	28	+9	38.24	
América Mineiro	(Brazil)	2 June 2025	9 August 2025	10	2	1	7	10	15	−5	20.00	
Novorizontino	(Brazil)	26 August 2025	present	71	35	20	16	114	63	+51	49.30	
Total				797	379	202	216	1,149	773	+376	47.55	―

== Honours ==
Cruzeiro U20

- Copa São Paulo de Futebol Júnior: 2007
- Campeonato Brasileiro Sub-20: 2007

Internacional B

- Campeonato Brasileiro Sub-23: 2010

Goiás

- Campeonato Goiano: 2012, 2013, 2016
- Campeonato Brasileiro Série B: 2012

América Mineiro

- Campeonato Brasileiro Série B: 2017

Botafogo

- Campeonato Brasileiro Série B: 2021

Sport Recife

- Campeonato Pernambucano: 2023

Avaí

- Campeonato Catarinense: 2025

Novorizontino

- Campeonato Brasileiro Série B: 2026
