= Anderson Gomes (football manager) =

Brazilian football manager (born 1971)

Personal information
- Full name: Anderson Leal Gomes
- Date of birth: 2 November 1971 (age 54)
- Place of birth: Rio de Janeiro, Brazil

Team information
- Current team: Guarani (manager)

Managerial career
- Years: Team
- 2022: Atlético Goianiense (interim)
- 2023: Atlético Goianiense (interim)
- 2023: Atlético Goianiense (interim)
- 2023: Atlético Goianiense (interim)
- 2024: Atlético Goianiense (interim)
- 2024: Atlético Goianiense (interim)
- 2025: Atlético Goianiense (interim)
- 2025: Atlético Goianiense (interim)
- 2026–: Guarani

Anderson Leal Gomes (born 2 November 1971) is a Brazilian football coach, currently the manager Guarani.

== Career ==
Born in Rio de Janeiro, Gomes graduated in Physical education at the Pontifical Catholic University of Paraná. He then started working as a fitness coach at several clubs, such as Coritiba, Atlético Goianiense, Bahia, Vitória, Mogi Mirim, Santo André, Botafogo and Corinthians; from 2018 until 2021, he worked in the technical staff of Eduardo Barroca.

In 2021, Gomes returned to Atlético Goianiense as Barroca's fitness coach, but remained in the technical staff for the 2022 season as an assistant coach, despite the head coach's departure. In May 2022, he was named interim head coach of the club after Umberto Louzer was sacked, and made his debut in charge on 18 May, in a 1–0 Copa Sudamericana win over Antofagasta.

Gomes was again an interim of Dragão on five further occasions in the 2023 and 2024 seasons, in the place of Eduardo Souza, Mozart, Alberto Valentim, Jair Ventura and Louzer; in the latter spell, he was confirmed as interim for the remainder of the year. On 2 March 2025, he again became an interim after Rafael Guanaes was dismissed.

== Managerial statistics ==
As of 15 March 2025.

Managerial record by team and tenure
Team	Nat	From	To	Record								Ref
Team	Nat	From	To	G	W	D	L	GF	GA	GD	Win %	Ref
Atlético Goianiense (interim)	(Brazil)	15 May 2022	17 May 2022	1	1	0	0	1	0	+1	100.00	
Atlético Goianiense (interim)	(Brazil)	4 March 2023	12 March 2023	2	2	0	0	9	2	+7	100.00	
Atlético Goianiense (interim)	(Brazil)	1 May 2023	5 May 2023	1	1	0	0	2	1	+1	100.00	
Atlético Goianiense (interim)	(Brazil)	10 July 2023	24 July 2023	3	1	1	1	5	4	+1	33.33	
Atlético Goianiense (interim)	(Brazil)	21 June 2024	7 July 2024	5	0	3	2	4	7	−3	0.00	
Atlético Goianiense (interim)	(Brazil)	29 October 2024	8 December 2024	7	2	2	3	6	8	−2	28.57	
Atlético Goianiense (interim)	(Brazil)	2 March 2025	13 March 2025	3	1	2	0	5	3	+2	33.33	
Atlético Goianiense (interim)	(Brazil)	13 May 2025	18 May 2025	1	0	1	0	1	1	+0	0.00	
Total				23	8	9	6	33	26	+7	34.78	—
