= Cléber Gaúcho =

Brazilian footballer (born 1974)

Personal information
- Full name: Cléber Nelson de Andrade Raphaelli
- Date of birth: 13 May 1974 (age 52)
- Place of birth: Camaquã, Brazil
- Height: 1.72 m (5 ft 8 in)
- Position: Defensive midfielder

Team information
- Current team: Velo Clube (head coach)

Youth career
- Brasil de Pelotas

Senior career*
Years	Team	Apps	(Gls)
1993–1995	Brasil de Pelotas		
1995–1997	XV de Piracicaba		
1998	Matonense		
1998	Etti Jundiaí		
1998	Brasil de Pelotas		
1999	Rio Branco-SP		
2000	União Barbarense		
2001	Caxias		
2002	15 de Novembro		
2002–2003	Criciúma	73	(3)
2004	Santo André	12	(1)
2005–2007	Goiás	73	(0)
2008	Rio Claro		
2008	Gama		
2008–2010	Brasil de Pelotas		

Managerial career
- 2013–2014: XV de Piracicaba
- 2015: Rio Verde-GO
- 2016: União Barbarense
- 2016: XV de Piracicaba
- 2017: Criciúma U20
- 2018: Velo Clube
- 2018: XV de Piracicaba
- 2019: Sertãozinho
- 2019: Grêmio Anápolis
- 2019: Trindade
- 2020: Velo Clube
- 2020–2021: Grêmio Anápolis
- 2021: Brasil de Pelotas
- 2022: Pouso Alegre
- 2022–2023: XV de Piracicaba
- 2023: Uberlândia
- 2024: Marília
- 2024: Grêmio Prudente
- 2025: Nacional-AM
- 2025: Anapolina
- 2026: Inhumas
- 2026: CRAC
- 2026–: Velo Clube
- * Club domestic league appearances and goals

Cléber Nelson de Andrade Raphaelli (born 13 May 1974), known as Cléber Gaúcho, is a Brazilian football manager and former player who played as a defensive midfielder. He is the current head coach of Velo Clube.

== Honours ==
=== Player ===
XV de Piracicaba

- Campeonato Brasileiro Série C: 1995

Criciúma

- Campeonato Brasileiro Série B: 2002
- Copa do Brasil: 2004
- Campeonato Catarinense: 2005

Goiás

- Campeonato Goiano: 2006

=== Manager ===
XV de Piracicaba

- Copa Paulista: 2016

Velo Clube

- Campeonato Paulista Série A3: 2020

Grêmio Anápolis

- Campeonato Goiano: 2021
