= Franco Muller =

Brazilian football manager (born 1979)

Personal information
- Full name: Franco Rafael Muller
- Date of birth: 19 November 1979 (age 46)
- Place of birth: Carazinho, Brazil

Managerial career
- Years: Team
- 2012: Ceará (assistant)
- 2013: Atlético Goianiense (assistant)
- 2014: Bragantino (assistant)
- 2015: Joinville (assistant)
- 2016: Flores da Cunha
- 2016: Passo Fundo U17
- 2017: Luverdense (assistant)
- 2018–2019: 3 de Febrero U17
- 2020–2021: Cuiabá (assistant)
- 2020: Cuiabá (interim)
- 2021: Cuiabá (interim)
- 2021: Cuiabá U20
- 2023: União Cacoalense
- 2023: Mixto U20
- 2023: Londrina (assistant)
- 2023: Londrina (interim)
- 2024: Desportiva U20
- 2024: Tupi

Franco Rafael Muller (born 19 November 1979) is a Brazilian football coach.

== Career ==
Born in Carazinho, Rio Grande do Sul, Muller moved to Cuiabá at early age, and began his career as an assistant fitness coach for Cuiabá EC's youth setup. In 2007 he joined Grêmio's youth categories, staying at the club for three years before working at Juventude, Caxias and Vasco da Gama as a video analyst.

After knowing Paulo César Gusmão at Vasco, Muller became his assistant at Ceará, Atlético Goianiense, Bragantino and Joinville. In February 2016, he was appointed manager of newly-formed side Flores da Cunha, but resigned in April. Late in the year, he was in charge of the under-17 side of Passo Fundo.

In 2017, Muller worked as an assistant at Luverdense before moving abroad, being in charge of Paraguayan side 3 de Febrero's under-17 squad. For the 2020 season, he returned to Cuiabá as Marcelo Chamusca's assistant.

On 11 November 2020, Muller was named interim manager after Chamusca was appointed at Fortaleza. After two matches (one in Copa do Brasil and one in Série B), he returned to his previous role after the appointment of Allan Aal.

In February 2021, after Aal left, Muller was again named interim manager.
