= Umberto Louzer =

Brazilian footballer and manager

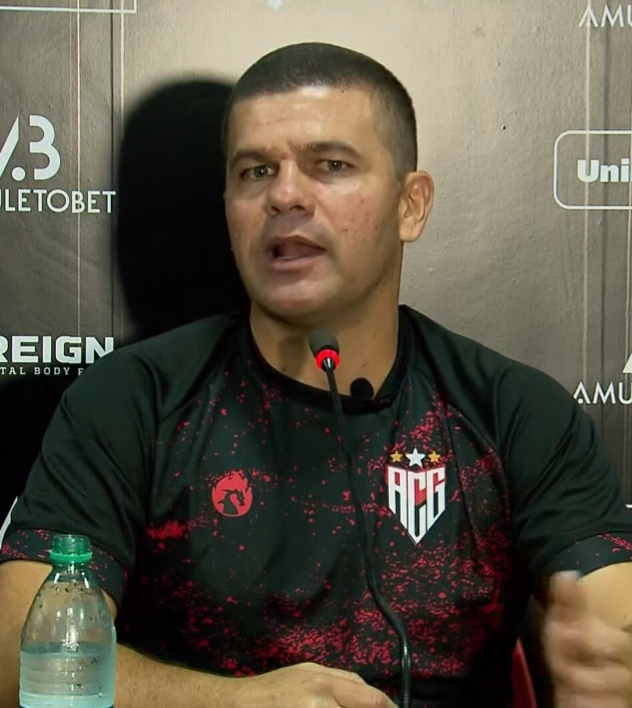
- Louzer in 2022

Personal information
- Full name: Umberto Lourenço Louzer Filho
- Date of birth: 24 February 1980 (age 46)
- Place of birth: Vila Velha, Brazil
- Height: 1.80 m (5 ft 11 in)
- Position: Defensive midfielder

Team information
- Current team: Criciúma (head coach)

Youth career
- Paulista

Senior career*
Years	Team	Apps	(Gls)
1999–2004	Paulista		
1999	→ Garça (loan)		
2005	Marília	8	(0)
2005–2007	Guarani	46	(0)
2008	Atlético Sorocaba	36	(0)
2009	Sendas		
2009	Ituiutaba	1	(0)
2010–2011	Juventude	38	(0)
2012–2013	Caxias	45	(0)
2013–2014	Paulista	6	(0)

Managerial career
- 2016–2017: Paulista U20
- 2017: Paulista (assistant)
- 2017: Guarani (assistant)
- 2018: Guarani
- 2019: Vila Nova
- 2019: Coritiba
- 2020–2021: Chapecoense
- 2021: Sport Recife
- 2022: Atlético Goianiense
- 2022: Juventude
- 2023: CRB
- 2023–2024: Guarani
- 2024: Chapecoense
- 2024: Atlético Goianiense
- 2025: CRB
- 2025: Novorizontino
- 2025–2026: Vila Nova
- 2026: América Mineiro
- 2026: Guarani
- 2026–: Criciúma
- * Club domestic league appearances and goals

Umberto Lourenço Louzer Filho (born 24 February 1980) is a Brazilian football coach and former player who played as a defensive midfielder. He is the current head coach of Criciúma.

== Playing career ==
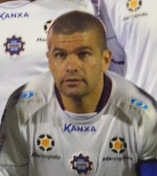
Louzer playing for Caxias in 2013

Known as Umberto during his playing days, he was a Paulista youth graduate. In 2005 he joined Marília, but moved to Guarani in May of that year.

After two years featuring sparingly at Bugre, Umberto signed for Atlético Sorocaba. On 27 January 2010, after representing Sendas and Ituiutaba, he was presented at Juventude.

On 11 October 2011, Umberto agreed to a contract with Caxias. He returned to his first club Paulista in 2013, and retired in the following year at the age of 34.

== Coaching career ==
Louzer began his coaching career with his first club Paulista's youth setup in 2016, being promoted to assistant of the first team in the following year. In February 2017, he was announced assistant of another club he represented as a player, Guarani.

On 3 January 2018, Louzer was appointed head coach of Guarani. On 19 April, after leading the club to a Campeonato Paulista Série A2 title, he renewed his contract for a further year.

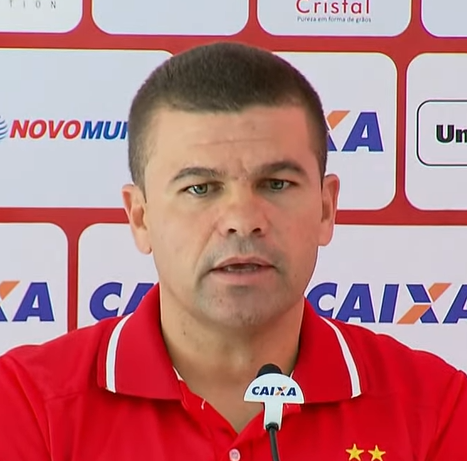
Louzer presented as head coach of Vila Nova in 2018

Louzer was sacked on 13 November 2018, and was subsequently in charge of Vila Nova and Coritiba during the 2019 season. On 17 February 2020, he was named head coach of Chapecoense.

Louzer left Chape on 14 April 2021, after winning the 2020 Campeonato Catarinense and the 2020 Campeonato Brasileiro Série B. The following day, he was named head coach of fellow top tier side Sport Recife.

On 23 August 2021, Louzer left Sport on a mutual agreement. The following 22 February, he took over Atlético Goianiense also in the first division.

On 15 May 2022, Louzer was sacked after a poor start in the 2022 Série A. On 22 June, he replaced Eduardo Baptista at the helm of fellow top tier side Juventude, but was himself dismissed on 3 October.

On 5 November 2022, Louzer was named in charge of CRB in the second division for the 2023 season. Despite winning the 2023 Campeonato Alagoano, he was sacked on 27 May 2023, after a poor start in the 2023 Série B.

On 13 June 2023, Louzer returned to Guarani, replacing Bruno Pivetti. Sacked the following 9 February, he returned to Chape two days later.

On 4 August 2024, Louzer left Chapecoense to return to Atlético Goianiense the following day. On 29 October, however, he resigned, and returned to CRB on 30 November.

On 27 March 2025, despite winning the year's Campeonato Alagoano, Louzer left CRB by mutual consent, and took over fellow league team Novorizontino nine days later. On 25 August, he was sacked from the latter after five winless matches, and returned to Vila exactly one month later.

On 18 March 2026, after being knocked out of the 2026 Copa do Brasil, Louzer was sacked by Vila Nova. On 31 May, he became América Mineiro's third head coach of the season.

Sacked by Coelho on 22 August 2026, Louzer returned to Guarani two days later. On 23 September, he took over Criciúma in the second division until the end of the year.

== Managerial statistics ==
As of 26 September 2026

Managerial record by team and tenure
Team	Nat	From	To	Record								Ref
Team	Nat	From	To	G	W	D	L	GF	GA	GD	Win %	Ref
Guarani	(Brazil)	3 January 2018	13 November 2018	54	25	13	16	78	56	+22	46.30	
Vila Nova	(Brazil)	26 November 2018	21 February 2019	8	4	3	1	11	7	+4	50.00	
Coritiba	(Brazil)	24 February 2019	21 September 2019	30	13	9	8	40	27	+13	43.33	
Chapecoense	(Brazil)	17 February 2020	14 April 2021	55	31	17	7	69	28	+41	56.36	
Sport Recife	(Brazil)	15 April 2021	23 August 2021	22	6	8	8	15	16	−1	27.27	
Atlético Goianiense	(Brazil)	22 February 2022	15 May 2022	22	10	8	4	31	21	+10	45.45	
Juventude	(Brazil)	22 June 2022	3 October 2022	16	1	6	9	9	27	−18	6.25	
CRB	(Brazil)	10 January 2023	28 May 2023	32	17	7	8	46	37	+9	53.13	
Guarani	(Brazil)	23 June 2023	9 February 2024	32	12	9	11	32	29	+3	37.50	
Chapecoense	(Brazil)	11 February 2024	4 August 2024	21	6	6	9	18	21	−3	28.57	
Atlético Goianiense	(Brazil)	5 August 2024	29 October 2024	11	3	1	7	6	16	−10	27.27	
CRB	(Brazil)	30 November 2024	27 March 2025	17	7	7	3	35	20	+15	41.18	
Novorizontino	(Brazil)	4 April 2025	25 August 2025	24	9	8	7	24	22	+2	37.50	
Vila Nova	(Brazil)	25 September 2025	18 March 2026	24	8	11	5	34	26	+8	33.33	
América Mineiro	(Brazil)	31 May 2026	22 August 2026	10	2	1	7	9	13	−4	20.00	
Guarani	(Brazil)	24 August 2026	23 September 2026	1	0	1	0	2	2	+0	0.00	
Criciúma	(Brazil)	23 September 2026	present	0	0	0	0	0	0	+0	—	
Total				363	153	109	101	450	341	+109	42.15	—

== Honours ==
=== Manager ===
Guarani

- Campeonato Paulista Série A2: 2018

Chapecoense

- Campeonato Catarinense: 2020
- Campeonato Brasileiro Série B: 2020

Atlético Goianiense

- Campeonato Goiano: 2022

CRB

- Campeonato Alagoano: 2023, 2025
