= Edson Vieira =

Brazilian football manager (born 1965)

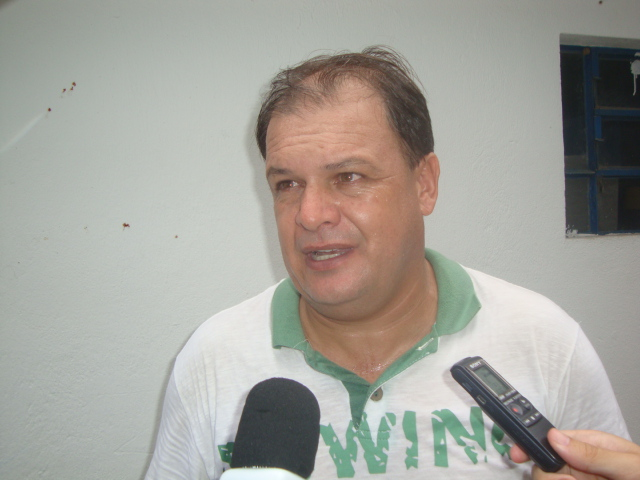
- Vieira in 2012

Personal information
- Full name: Edson Roberto Vieira
- Date of birth: 9 October 1965 (age 61)
- Place of birth: São João, Brazil
- Height: 1.73 m (5 ft 8 in)
- Position: Midfielder

Team information
- Current team: Flamengo-SP (head coach)

Youth career
- Matsubara
- Londrina

Senior career*
Years	Team	Apps	(Gls)
1981–1985	Londrina		
1985–1987	Botafogo	?	(2)
1987–1990	Universidad Guadalajara		
- Atlas
- Mogi Mirim
- Ponte Preta
- Comercial-SP
1992	Londrina	12	(1)
1992	Botafogo-SP		
1993	Botafogo		
1993	Unión Magdalena	?	(3)
1994	Once Caldas		
1995	Millonarios		
- Fortaleza
- Santa Cruz
1997	Edessaikos	2	(0)
1997	Noroeste		
1998	Londrina		
1998	Ceará		
1999	Portuguesa Londrinense		
1999	Rio Preto		

International career
1983	Brazil U17		

Managerial career
- 2001: Portuguesa Londrinense U20
- 2002: PSTC U20
- 2002: Portuguesa Londrinense
- 2002: Universidad Guadalajara (assistant)
- 2003: Nacional-PR
- 2003: Goiás (assistant)
- 2004: Benfica (assistant)
- 2004: Sporting CP (assistant)
- 2004: Barreirense (assistant)
- 2004: Águia-PR
- 2005: Itararé
- 2005: Comercial-SP
- 2006: Atlético Sorocaba
- 2006: Caxias-SC
- 2006: Londrina
- 2006: Portuguesa Londrinense
- 2006: Itararé
- 2007: União São João
- 2007: São Carlos
- 2007: Atlético Sorocaba
- 2008: União São João
- 2008–2009: União Barbarense
- 2009: XV de Piracicaba
- 2009: União São João
- 2010: Lemense
- 2010: Gama
- 2010–2011: São Carlos
- 2011–2012: Sertãozinho
- 2012: Taubaté
- 2012–2013: São Bento
- 2014: Matonense
- 2014: Rio Branco-SP
- 2014: Olímpia
- 2015: Taubaté
- 2015: Maringá
- 2016: Flamengo-SP
- 2016: Inter de Bebedouro
- 2017: Rio Branco-SP
- 2017–2018: São Carlos
- 2018: VOCEM
- 2018: Hercílio Luz
- 2019: Comercial-SP
- 2019: Rio Claro
- 2020–2021: São Bento
- 2021: Atibaia
- 2022: São José-SP
- 2022: América de Natal
- 2023: Londrina (assistant)
- 2023: Londrina (interim)
- 2023: Londrina U20
- 2023: Londrina (interim)
- 2024: Rio Claro
- 2024: União São João
- 2024: São Caetano
- 2025: Inter de Bebedouro
- 2025–: Flamengo-SP
- * Club domestic league appearances and goals

Edson Roberto Vieira (born 9 October 1965) is a Brazilian professional football coach and former player who played as a midfielder. He is the current head coach of Flamengo-SP.

Vieira was nicknamed Maradoninha during his playing days by João Saldanha, as an allusion to Diego Maradona. He was also the first player to score a goal at the Estadio Palogrande in 1994.

== Honours ==
=== Player ===
Millonarios

- Copa Colombia: 1995

Ceará

- Campeonato Cearense: 1996

Rio Preto

- Campeonato Paulista Série A3: 1999

=== Manager ===
Nacional-PR

- Campeonato Paranaense Série Prata: 2003

São Bento

- Campeonato Paulista Série A3: 2013

Taubaté

- Campeonato Paulista Série A3: 2015
