= Omar Feitosa =

Brazilian football manager

Personal information
- Full name: José Omar Feitosa Alves
- Date of birth: 8 March 1967 (age 59)
- Place of birth: Curitiba, Brazil

Team information
- Current team: Santos (fitness coach)

Managerial career
- Years: Team
- 2002–2003: Paraná (assistant)
- 2015–2016: Brasília
- 2022: Paraná
- 2023: Iporá
- 2023: Londrina
- 2023: Metropolitano
- 2024: Ji-Paraná

José Omar Feitosa Alves (born 8 March 1967) is a Brazilian football coach, currently the fitness coach of Santos.

== Career ==
Born in Curitiba, Paraná, Feitosa was a fitness coach of the youth sides of Colorado in 1988, before working under the same capacity at Paraná in 1997. In 2002, he was also an assistant of Caio Júnior and Cuca also at Paraná.

Feitosa also worked with Cuca at São Paulo and Grêmio in 2004, Flamengo, Coritiba and Associação Desportiva São Caetano in 2005 and Botafogo in 2006–07 before joining Palmeiras' permanent staff in 2007. He left the latter club on 5 March 2010, and joined Jorginho's staff at Atlético Paranaense in June 2012.

On 26 January 2013, Feitosa returned to Palmeiras, now as a director of football. He was fired in December 2014, and agreed to join SC Jaraguá as their head coach the following March; on 27 May, however, he left the club to take over Brasília.

Feitosa was in charge of Brasília during their first-ever international competition, the 2015 Copa Sudamericana, where the club knocked out Goiás in the first phase. He resigned from the club on 2 February 2016, and returned to Palmeiras on 13 March, as a fitness coach.

Feitosa was moved to a science coordinator role in 2019, before leaving Verdão on 30 December of that year. He rejoined Cuca's staff at Santos on 7 August 2020, before both went separate ways in the following year, with Cuca taking over Atlético Mineiro and Feitosa opting to pursue a career as a head coach.

On 10 March 2022, Feitosa was announced back at Paraná, now as the head coach. He left on 17 August after being knocked out in the 2022 Série D, and was named in charge of Iporá on 7 December.

Feitosa was sacked by Iporá on 24 January 2023, with only one win in four matches. On 6 February, he replaced Edinho at the helm of Londrina, but was dismissed seventeen days later, after just four matches.

On 7 March 2023, Feitosa was announced as head coach of Metropolitano, but left the club on 12 June under the intent to obtain his CBF Pro license. He took over Ji-Paraná on 27 December, but was sacked on 24 March 2024, after two consecutive losses.

On 5 August 2025, Feitosa was named Performance Coordinator at Atlético Mineiro, but only lasted 43 days on the role before being fired. On 19 March 2026, he returned to coaching duties, again returning to Cuca's staff as the fitness coach of Santos.
