= São João, Paraná =

Coordinates: 25°49′40″S 52°43′30″W

- Municipality
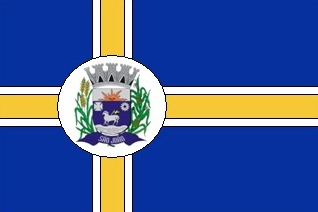
- Flag
- Interactive map of São João, Paraná
- Country: Brazil
- Region: Southern
- State: Paraná
- Mesoregion: Sudoeste Paranaense

Population (2022)
  - Total: 11,886
- Time zone: UTC−3 (BRT)

São João, Paraná is a municipality in the state of Paraná in the Southern Region of Brazil.

== See also ==
- List of municipalities in Paraná
