= Blaze.com =

Brazilian online gambling website

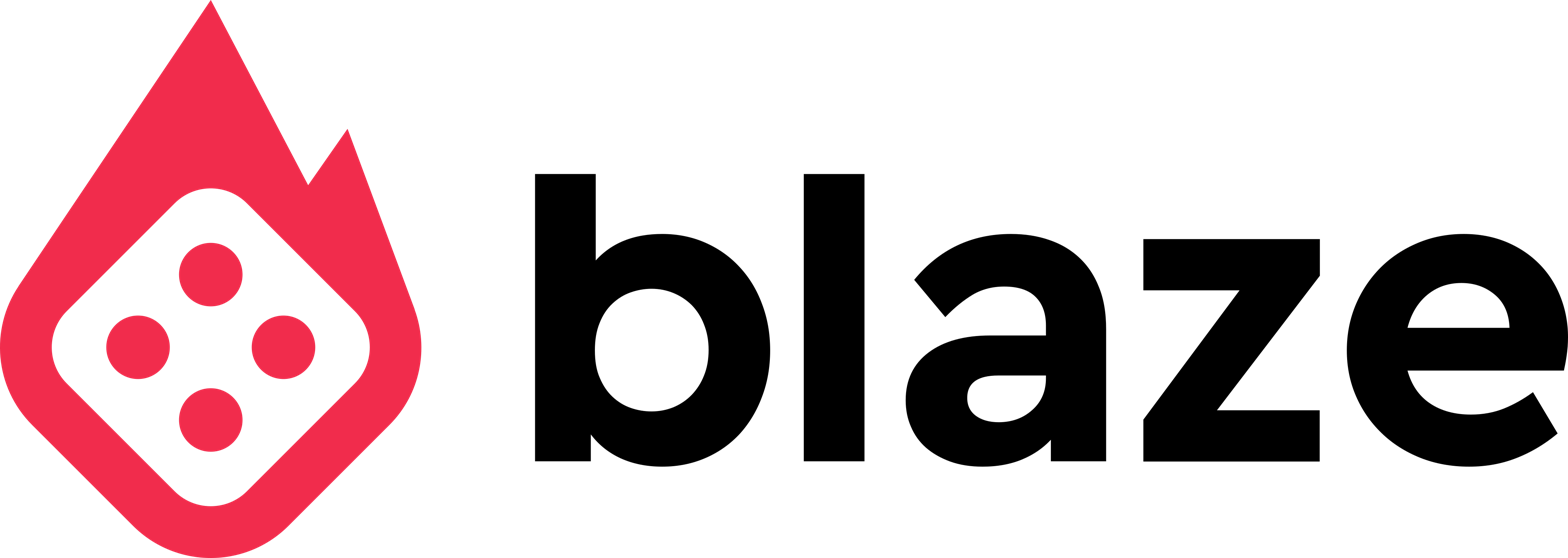
- Company type: Privately held company
- Industry: Online gambling
- Founded: 2019; 7 years ago
- Headquarters: Curaçao (operator: Prolific Trade N.V.)
- Area served: Brazil
- Products: Online casino, betting/gaming platform
- Services: Real-money online gaming
- Owner: Prolific Trade N.V.
- Website: www.blaze.com

Blaze.com is a Brazilian online gambling platform. It is managed by Prolific Trade N.V. a company registered in Curaçao.. Due to changes in Brazilian legislation, the management was later switched to Foggo Entertainment Ltda in Brazil Games available in the Blaze platform include roulette, blackjack, slot machines, poker and rocket.

== History ==
According to the company's website, it was founded in 2019. There is ambiguity as to the identity of Blaze's owners. In a 2019 statement, Blaze said that disclosure of the identity of its owners would pose a security threat. It maintained that the company has a multi-stakeholder ownership structure and that it does not own any legal entities in the United States.

Blaze.com was launched in Brazil in 2023 through an aggressive influencer sponsorship campaign. Brazilian footballer Neymar Jr., a known gaming enthusiast, has been one of the company's endorsers since 2022. One of Blaze's offerings called "crash game" was named after him.

In July 2023 the Brazilian parliament launched an inquiry that investigated allegations of fraud, made by digital content creator Daniel Penin. One of his claims was that Blaze sponsors were paid each time a gambler loses money in its platform. Curaçao's finance minister Javier Silvania also asked for investigations regarding the allegations and irregularities. The Brazilian regulator Anatel closed the Blaze website in September 2023 but Blaze denied the allegations and appealed the decision. The company is still currently in operation.

By 2025, the website was one of 30 sports betting and online gaming platforms authorized to operate in Brazil until 2029. The permit to operate was granted through the country's Law No. 13,756 passed in 2018, and Law No. 14,790, which was promulgated in 2024. The company is headquartered in Curacao, a known tax haven.

== Games ==
Blaze.com offers its own games based on different series. An example is the Blaze Originals, a series of games composed of Crash, Double, and the casual style games called Mines, Dice, Limbo, Tower, Slide, Plinko, and Coin Flip.

In 2025, Blaze introduced "Lightning Bac Bo", which is based on the classic casino game. Instead of Baccarat cards, the players play the Sic Bo dice and bet on a number before rolling four dice. The Lightning Bac Bo is part of the Lightning series, which is composed of more than 10 other games that include Lightning Roulette, and Lightning Blackjack, among others. Blaze's games feature multiplier features, which can increase the amount of money won by players.
