= Camaquã, Porto Alegre =

Neighborhood in Porto Alegre, Brazil

Camaquã is a neighbourhood (bairro) in the city of Porto Alegre. It was created by Law 2022 from December 7, 1959.
