= Daniel Neri =

Portuguese football manager

Personal information
- Full name: Daniel Jorge Neri Marinho
- Date of birth: 11 July 1979 (age 47)
- Place of birth: Amarante, Portugal

Team information
- Current team: Madureira (head coach)

Managerial career
- Years: Team
- 2008–2010: Progresso
- 2010–2012: Dragon Force
- 2012–2013: Porto-PE U20
- 2013: Porto-PE
- 2014: Sport Recife U17
- 2015–2017: Sport Recife U20
- 2018: Flamengo de Arcoverde
- 2019–2021: Salgueiro
- 2021: Sampaio Corrêa
- 2021: América de Natal
- 2022: Sergipe
- 2024: Madureira
- 2025–: Madureira

Daniel Jorge Neri Marinho (born 11 July 1979) is a Portuguese football manager, currently the head coach of Brazilian club Madureira.

== Career ==
Born in Amarante, Tâmega e Sousa, Neri had an experience in charge of the lowly side Sport Progresso, and with Dragon Force (a youth setup linked to FC Porto) before moving permanently to Brazil in 2012. He then joined Porto-PE's youth setup before being named manager of the first team for the 2014 Campeonato Pernambucano, which started in December 2013.

Neri was sacked by Porto on 30 December 2013, and moved to Sport Recife in the following year, being initially an under-17 manager. In December 2017, after being in charge of the under-20s, he was appointed manager of Flamengo de Arcoverde for the ensuing campaign.

Neri was dismissed on 8 February 2018, after being winless in the first five matches of the Pernambucano. He remained more than a year without a club before being named at the helm of Salgueiro on 16 April 2019.

In the 2020 Pernambucano, Neri led Salgueiro to their first-ever title, which also made them the first club outside Recife to win the tournament, and became the first European to lift the trophy. In the 2020 Série D, the club reached the round of 16 but was knocked out by Altos.

On 29 April 2021, Neri replaced Rafael Guanaes at Série B club Sampaio Corrêa. On 27 May, despite winning the year's Campeonato Maranhense, he left the club on a mutual agreement.

Neri was announced América de Natal manager on 31 May 2021, but left the club less than a month later after only three matches. On 17 February of the following year, he was named in charge of Sergipe.

== Honours ==
Salgueiro

- Campeonato Pernambucano: 2020

Sampaio Corrêa

- Campeonato Maranhense: 2021

Sergipe

- Campeonato Sergipano: 2022
