= Eduardo Baptista =

Brazilian football coach (born 1970)

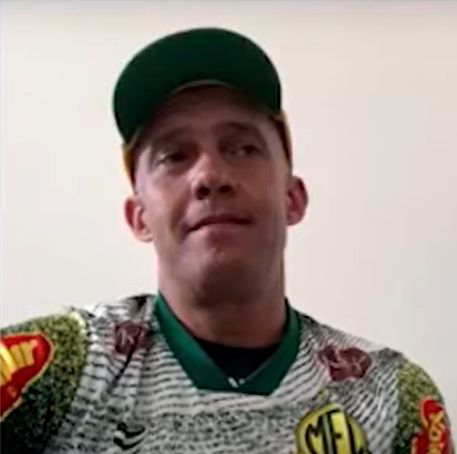
- Baptista in 2021

Personal information
- Full name: Eduardo Alexandre Baptista
- Date of birth: 30 March 1970 (age 56)
- Place of birth: Campinas, Brazil
- Position: Centre back

Team information
- Current team: Internacional (head coach)

Youth career
- Years: Team
- 1985: Juventus

Managerial career
- 2014–2015: Sport Recife
- 2015–2016: Fluminense
- 2016: Ponte Preta
- 2017: Palmeiras
- 2017: Atlético Paranaense
- 2017–2018: Ponte Preta
- 2018: Coritiba
- 2018: Sport Recife
- 2019: Vila Nova
- 2020: CSA
- 2020–2021: Mirassol
- 2021: Remo
- 2022: Mirassol
- 2022: Juventude
- 2022: Atlético Goianiense
- 2023–2025: Novorizontino
- 2025–2026: Criciúma
- 2026–: Internacional

Eduardo Alexandre Baptista (born 30 March 1970), is a Brazilian professional football coach, currently in charge of Internacional.

== Career ==
Born in Campinas, São Paulo, Baptista started playing for Juventus as a central defender. However, due to his lack of temper on the field, he was advised to leave football by his father, Nelsinho.

In 2002, after spells at clubs in his native state, Baptista joined his father's staff at Goiás, as a fitness coach. The duo remained together for the following nine years, only splitting due to the Japanese tsunami in 2011, when both were at Kashiwa Reysol; Eduardo subsequently returned to Sport Recife (club which he already worked from 2007 to 2009) while Nelsinho remained at Kashiwa.

On 31 January 2014 Baptista was appointed interim coach, replacing fired Geninho. On 14 February he was definitely appointed as head coach, and led the side to both Campeonato Pernambucano and Copa do Nordeste winning campaigns.

On 17 September 2015, Baptista left Sport and was appointed at Fluminense, replacing fired Enderson Moreira. On 25 February 2016, after only two wins in six matches, he was sacked by Flu. On 15 April, he replaced Alexandre Gallo at Ponte Preta's reign.

Baptista took Ponte to an impressive eighth place in the league, only four points shy of qualifying for the continental championship. On 2 December 2016 he resigned, and signed a one-year contract with Palmeiras fourteen days later.

On 4 May 2017, Baptista was relieved from his duties at Verdão. He was named Atlético Paranaense head coach on 23 May, but was sacked nonetheless on 10 July.

On 20 September 2017, Baptista returned to Ponte. Dismissed the following 9 March, he took over Coritiba on 16 April 2018, but was sacked from the latter club on 10 August.

On 15 August 2018, Baptista returned to Sport, replacing Claudinei Oliveira and joining the club four months after his father Nelsinho left the very same role. He resigned on 24 September, after just eight matches, and was announced as Vila Nova head coach on 23 February 2019.

Sacked by Vila on 13 July 2019, Baptista was named in charge of CSA the following 10 February. Dismissed by the latter on 30 August 2020, he was appointed head coach of Mirassol four days later.

Baptista led Mirassol to their first-ever national title in the 2020 Série D, and managed to avoid relegation in the 2021 Série C. On 11 November 2021, he was appointed Remo head coach, with a return to Mirassol for the 2022 season also agreed.

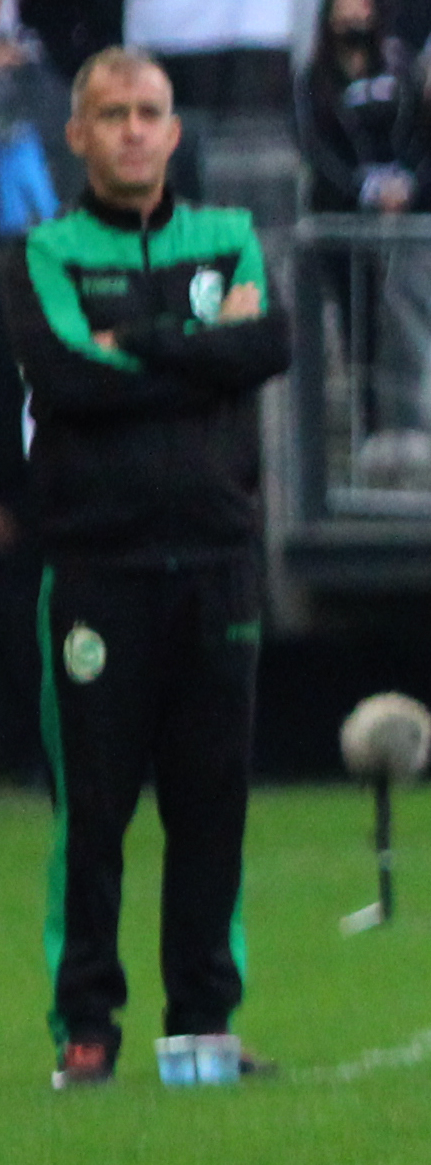
Baptista coaching Juventude in 2022

On 2 March 2022, a day after knocking out Grêmio of the 2022 Copa do Brasil, Baptista announced his departure from Mirassol. The following day, he was announced as head coach of Juventude in the top tier, but was sacked from the latter on 20 June, with the club in the last position.

On 28 August 2022, Baptista was named Atlético Goianiense head coach, but left on 29 September after just six matches. On 16 November, he was presented at Novorizontino for the upcoming season.

Baptista was sacked by Novorizontino on 3 April 2025, and took over fellow second division side Criciúma on 7 May. On 23 November of that year, despite finishing fifth for a third consecutive year (the previous two times with Novorizontino), he renewed his contract until 2027.

On 23 September 2026, Baptista left Criciúma to take over Internacional in the top tier.

== Personal life ==
Baptista is the son of Nelsinho Baptista, who is also a coach.

== Coaching statistics ==
As of 23 September 2026

Coaching record by team and tenure
Team	Nat	From	To	Record								Ref
Team	Nat	From	To	G	W	D	L	GF	GA	GD	Win %	Ref
Sport Recife	(Brazil)	31 January 2014	17 September 2015	123	56	31	36	166	122	+44	45.53	
Fluminense	(Brazil)	17 September 2015	25 February 2016	23	8	4	11	34	34	+0	34.78	
Ponte Preta	(Brazil)	15 April 2016	2 December 2016	43	17	11	15	58	55	+3	39.53	
Palmeiras	(Brazil)	16 December 2016	4 May 2017	23	14	4	5	43	23	+20	60.87	
Atlético Paranaense	(Brazil)	23 May 2017	10 July 2017	13	5	3	5	14	15	−1	38.46	
Ponte Preta	(Brazil)	20 September 2017	9 March 2018	27	6	9	12	18	28	−10	22.22	
Coritiba	(Brazil)	16 April 2018	10 August 2018	18	6	8	4	21	18	+3	33.33	
Sport Recife	(Brazil)	15 August 2018	24 September 2018	8	1	1	6	2	12	−10	12.50	
Vila Nova	(Brazil)	23 February 2019	13 July 2019	22	5	10	7	20	21	−1	22.73	
CSA	(Brazil)	10 February 2020	30 August 2020	15	6	1	8	17	14	+3	40.00	
Mirassol	(Brazil)	3 September 2020	11 November 2021	56	25	10	21	82	63	+19	44.64	
Remo	(Brazil)	11 November 2021	13 December 2021	8	2	5	1	9	5	+4	25.00	
Mirassol	(Brazil)	13 December 2021	2 March 2022	10	5	4	1	19	13	+6	50.00	
Juventude	(Brazil)	3 March 2022	20 June 2022	17	3	5	9	15	29	−14	17.65	
Atlético Goianiense	(Brazil)	28 August 2022	29 September 2022	6	1	0	5	5	11	−6	16.67	
Novorizontino	(Brazil)	16 November 2022	3 April 2025	124	60	32	32	156	102	+54	48.39	
Criciúma	(Brazil)	7 May 2025	23 September 2026	75	35	20	20	87	73	+14	46.67	
Internacional	(Brazil)	23 September 2026	present	0	0	0	0	0	0	+0	—	
Total				544	226	137	181	673	559	+114	41.54	—

== Honours ==
Sport Recife

- Copa do Nordeste: 2014
- Campeonato Pernambucano: 2014

Mirassol

- Campeonato Brasileiro Série D: 2020

Remo

- Copa Verde: 2021
