= Fernando Marchiori =

Brazilian footballer and manager (born 1979)

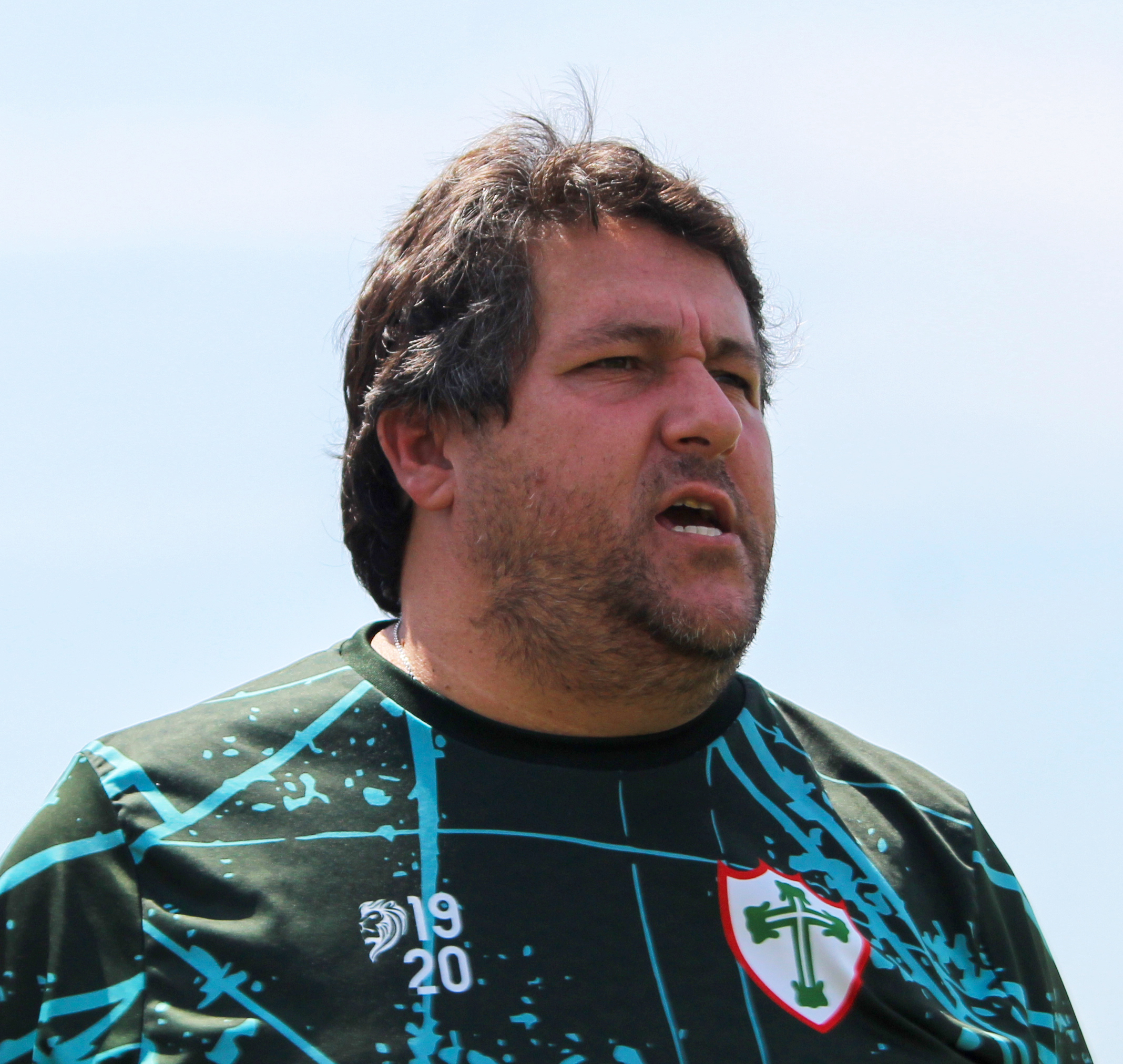
- Marchiori as head coach of Portuguesa in 2021

Personal information
- Full name: Fernando Marchiori Lavagnoli
- Date of birth: 19 June 1979 (age 47)
- Place of birth: São Paulo, Brazil
- Height: 1.73 m (5 ft 8 in)
- Position: Midfielder

Team information
- Current team: XV de Piracicaba (head coach)

Senior career*
Years	Team	Apps	(Gls)
1993–1999	Portuguesa		
1999	Juventus		
2000–2001	ECO		
2002	CRB		
2002	Avaí		
2003	Istres		
2003–2004	União Barbarense		
2004	Paraná	27	(2)
2005	Córdoba	21	(1)
2005	América-SP		
2006	Mogi Mirim		
2006	Juventude	11	(0)
2007	Rio Branco-SP		
2007	Adap Galo Maringá		
2008	Puertollano	15	(1)
2008–2009	San Fernando	20	(0)

Managerial career
- 2013–2014: Luverdense (assistant)
- 2014–2015: Cuiabá
- 2015: Maringá
- 2016: Cuiabá
- 2016–2018: Maringá
- 2019: Santo André
- 2019–2020: Água Santa
- 2020–2021: Portuguesa
- 2022: Oeste
- 2022–2023: ABC
- 2023: Náutico
- 2023: Sampaio Corrêa
- 2024: Santo André
- 2024–2025: Primavera
- 2026: Caxias
- 2026–: XV de Piracicaba
- * Club domestic league appearances and goals

Fernando Marchiori Lavagnoli (born 19 June 1979), known as Fernando Marchiori, is a Brazilian football coach and former player who played as a midfielder. He is the current head coach of XV de Piracicaba.

== Career ==
Born in São Paulo, Fernando began his career in basic categories of Portuguesa. Started by Juventus, CRB and do Avaí, until you get to Europe. In the old continent, joined in Istres of France. He returned to Brazil in 2003 to serve in the Union Barbarense, where he obtained highlight and was hired in the year following, the Paraná.

In 2005, he returned to Europe to work in Spanish football defending the Córdoba. He returned months later to strengthen the América (SP) in Paulistão 2006, but was little time in club of São Jose do Rio Preto being contracted by Mogi Mirim. Yet passed by Juventude and Rio Branco (SP), until you reach the Adap Galo Maringá where, little time, returned to the pool. In 2008, he returned to Europe to play at Puertollano in Spain.

At the end of the year 2008, was incorporated into the cast of San Fernando, where he stopped to play. His career of coach began with stages in Deportivo La Coruña and in Cádiz, both clubs of Spanish football. In Spain he studied and made sure that in the course of monitor of football performed by the Royal Spanish Football Federation. Since 2013, is in Luverdense where first was as an assistant coach and in October 2014, takes over the command of the team. But in the meantime was dismissed, due to recast in the technical commission of the club.

== Managerial statistics ==
As of match played 21 October 2025

Managerial record by team and tenure
Team	Nat	From	To	Record							
Team	Nat	From	To	G	W	D	L	GF	GA	GD	Win %
Cuiabá	(Brazil)	1 January 2014	14 July 2015	75	33	22	20	83	60	+23	44.00
Maringá	(Brazil)	23 August 2015	16 November 2015	19	10	4	5	26	16	+10	52.63
Cuiabá	(Brazil)	25 November 2015	19 April 2016	21	10	6	5	28	10	+18	47.62
Maringá	(Brazil)	20 April 2016	22 November 2018	43	20	11	12	59	43	+16	46.51
Santo André	(Brazil)	23 November 2018	23 May 2019	21	8	6	7	25	21	+4	38.10
Água Santa	(Brazil)	9 May 2019	30 January 2020	19	6	5	8	18	20	−2	31.58
Portuguesa	(Brazil)	12 February 2020	1 October 2021	63	33	19	11	92	48	+44	52.38
Oeste	(Brazil)	11 January 2022	17 February 2022	8	3	4	1	5	3	+2	37.50
ABC	(Brazil)	29 March 2022	15 May 2023	66	31	19	16	97	52	+45	46.97
Náutico	(Brazil)	29 May 2023	14 August 2023	12	4	6	2	15	13	+2	33.33
Sampaio Corrêa	(Brazil)	13 September 2023	31 October 2023	11	3	2	6	11	15	−4	27.27
Santo André	(Brazil)	19 January 2024	5 February 2024	5	0	2	3	2	6	−4	0.00
Primavera	(Brazil)	4 June 2024	28 October 2025	43	20	19	4	57	29	+28	46.51
Caixas	(Brazil)	29 October 2025	1 February 2026	6	2	1	3	8	5	+3	33.33
XV de Piracicaba	(Brazil)	2 February 2026	present	7	4	1	2	6	5	+1	57.14
Total				419	187	127	105	530	343	+187	44.63

== Honours ==
=== Player ===
ECO

- Campeonato Paulista Série B2: 2000
- Campeonato Paulista Série B: 2001

CRB

- Campeonato Alagoano: 2002

=== Manager ===
Cuiabá

- Copa Verde: 2015
- Campeonato Mato-Grossense: 2015

Maringá

- Copa Paraná: 2015, 2017
- Campeonato Paranaense Série B: 2017

Santo André

- Campeonato Paulista Série A2: 2019

Portuguesa

- Copa Paulista: 2020
