= Higo Magalhães =

Brazilian football manager (born 1982)

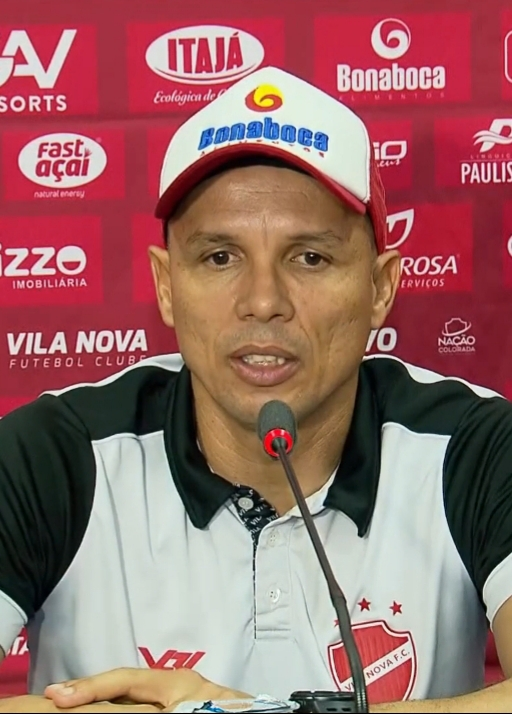
- Higo Magalhães with Vila Nova in 2022

Personal information
- Full name: Higo Magalhães Batista
- Date of birth: 6 April 1982 (age 44)
- Place of birth: Goiânia, Brazil
- Height: 1.82 m (6 ft 0 in)
- Position: Defensive midfielder

Team information
- Current team: Londrina (head coach)

Youth career
- Vila Nova

Senior career*
Years	Team	Apps	(Gls)
2002–2009	Vila Nova	60	(0)
2009	Goiânia	7	(0)
2010	Canedense	16	(1)
2010	Anápolis	7	(0)
2011	Aparecidense	6	(0)
2011	Boa Esporte	19	(0)
2012	Villa Nova	6	(0)
2012–2013	Boa Esporte	9	(0)
2013	Itumbiara	7	(0)
2013	Aparecidense	6	(0)
2014	Uberlândia	1	(0)
2014	Goiânia	2	(0)

Managerial career
- 2015: Vila Nova U17 (assistant)
- 2016: Rondoniense (assistant)
- 2016: Grêmio Anápolis (assistant)
- 2017: Atlético Goianiense U20 (assistant)
- 2017–2018: Vila Nova U17
- 2018–2019: Atlético Goianiense U17
- 2019: Atlético Goianiense U20 (interim)
- 2020–2021: Vila Nova (assistant)
- 2021: Vila Nova (interim)
- 2021: Vila Nova (interim)
- 2021–2022: Vila Nova
- 2023: Camboriú
- 2023: Manaus
- 2023: Centro Oeste
- 2023–2024: Vila Nova
- 2024–2025: CSA
- 2025: CSA
- 2026: Brusque
- 2027–: Londrina
- * Club domestic league appearances and goals

Higo Magalhães Batista (born 6 April 1982), sometimes known as just Higo, is a Brazilian football coach and former player who played as a defensive midfielder. He is the current head coach of Londrina.

== Playing career ==
Born in Goiânia, Goiás, Higo began his career at Vila Nova, making his senior debut in the 2002 Série B. He left the club in 2009, and moved to Goiânia EC.

In 2011, after representing local sides Canedense, Anápolis and Aparecidense, Higo joined Boa Esporte. He left the club to sign for Villa Nova ahead of the 2012 Campeonato Mineiro, but rejoined the side on 27 April 2012.

Higo returned to his native state in 2013, joining Itumbiara. He subsequently returned to former side Aparecidense, before agreeing to a contract with Uberlândia for the 2014 campaign.

In July 2014, Higo returned to Goiânia, where he featured rarely and retired in the end of the season, aged 32.

== Coaching career ==
After retiring, Higo worked as Ariel Mamede's assistant for several years, replacing him at the helm of Atlético Goianiense's under-20 squad in December 2018. In 2020, he returned to his first club Vila Nova, as a permanent assistant manager of the first team and manager of the under-23s.

Higo was named interim manager of the first team in March 2021, after Márcio Fernandes was sacked. He returned to his previous role after the appointment of Wagner Lopes, but was again named interim in June when Lopes left the club.

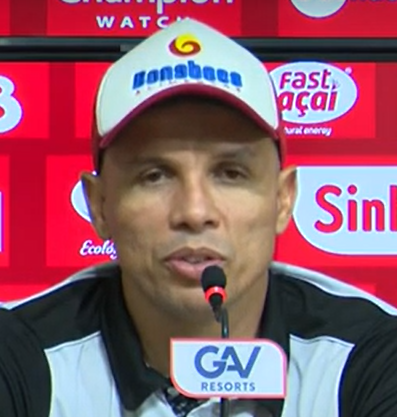
Higo as head coach of Vila Nova in 2022

Back to the assistant role after the arrival of Hemerson Maria, Higo returned to the managerial role in August 2021, after Maria resigned. On 24 November, he renewed his contract for the 2022 season.

On 15 May 2022, Higo was sacked by Vila Nova. He was announced as head coach of Camboriú on 19 November, but was dismissed the following 6 February.

On 24 February 2023, Higo replaced Paulo Henrique Marques at the helm of Série C side Manaus. He was dismissed on 19 June, with the club in the relegation zone, and returned to Vila Nova on 23 October, after a brief spell at Centro Oeste.

Higo was left Vila on 17 March 2024, after a 2–0 loss to Aparecidense in the first leg of the 2024 Campeonato Goiano semifinals. On 20 May, he was named in charge of CSA in the third division.

On 27 July 2025, Higo was sacked from CSA, but returned to the club just 17 days after his dismissal. He left in September after failing to avoid relegation, and was announced as head coach of Brusque for the 2026 campaign on 11 November 2025.

On 19 October 2026, after narrowly missing out promotion with Brusque, Higo left, and was announced as head coach of Londrina for the ensuing campaign eight days later.

== Managerial statistics ==
As of 14 November 2025

Managerial record by team and tenure
Team	Nat	From	To	Record							
Team	Nat	From	To	G	W	D	L	GF	GA	GD	Win %
Vila Nova (interim)	(Brazil)	6 March 2021	8 March 2021	1	0	0	1	0	1	−1	0.00
Vila Nova	(Brazil)	6 August 2021	15 May 2022	68	30	25	13	80	58	+22	44.12
Camboriú	(Brazil)	19 November 2022	6 February 2023	5	1	2	2	2	5	−3	20.00
Manaus	(Brazil)	24 February 2023	19 June 2023	13	4	1	8	9	19	−10	30.77
Centro Oeste	(Brazil)	11 July 2023	23 October 2023	14	6	6	2	13	9	+4	42.86
Vila Nova	(Brazil)	23 October 2023	17 March 2024	19	12	4	3	30	16	+14	63.16
CSA	(Brazil)	20 May 2024	27 July 2025	53	26	15	12	76	46	+30	49.06
CSA	(Brazil)	13 August 2025	19 September 2025	4	0	1	3	3	7	−4	0.00
Brusque	(Brazil)	11 November 2025	present	0	0	0	0	0	0	+0	—
Career total				177	79	54	44	203	161	+42	44.63

== Honours ==
=== Player ===
Vila Nova

- Campeonato Goiano: 2005

Boa Esporte

- Taça Minas Gerais: 2012
