= Bruno Pivetti =

Brazilian football coach (born 1984)

Personal information
- Full name: Bruno Marques Fernandes Pivetti
- Date of birth: 19 February 1984 (age 42)
- Place of birth: Campinas, Brazil

Team information
- Current team: Náutico (head coach)

Managerial career
- Years: Team
- 2008–2010: Audax (youth)
- 2011–2014: Audax (assistant)
- 2014: Guaratinguetá (assistant)
- 2015: Audax (assistant)
- 2015–2016: Atlético Paranaense U19
- 2016–2017: Atlético Paranaense (assistant)
- 2016: Atlético Paranaense (interim)
- 2017–2018: Ferroviária (assistant)
- 2018: Ferroviária (interim)
- 2018–2019: Ludogorets Razgrad (assistant)
- 2019–2020: Vitória (assistant)
- 2020: Vitória
- 2021: Tombense
- 2021: CSA
- 2022: Villa Nova
- 2022: Goiás
- 2022: Tombense
- 2023: Chapecoeense
- 2023: Guarani
- 2023: Náutico
- 2024: Água Santa
- 2024: Náutico
- 2024: CRB
- 2025: Operário Ferroviário
- 2025–2026: Flamengo U20
- 2026–: Náutico

Bruno Marques Fernandes Pivetti (born 19 February 1984) is a Brazilian football coach, currently in charge of Náutico.

== Career ==
=== Early career ===
Born in Campinas, São Paulo, Pivetti started working as an assistant manager and physiologist of Audax's under-15 squad in 2008. He later moved to the under-20s and was subsequently promoted to the main squad under the same role.

On 13 February 2015, Pivetti moved to Atlético Paranaense, being initially appointed head coach of the under-19 team. The following 8 January, he was named assistant in the first team, being also an interim head coach in March after Cristóvão Borges' dismissal; he was in charge of two matches, one draw and one defeat.

In August 2017, Pivetti was announced as the new assistant of Ferroviária. The following May, after PC de Oliveira's dismissal, he was named interim head coach, but opted to leave the club shortly after, after accepting an offer from PFC Ludogorets Razgrad in Bulgaria, to work as Paulo Autuori's assistant. He remained at the club even after Autuori left.

=== Vitória ===
On 6 August 2019, Pivetti was presented as Carlos Amadeu's assistant at Vitória. On 19 June 2020, he was appointed first team head coach after the dismissal of Geninho.

Pivetti was sacked from Vitória on 7 October 2020.

=== Tombense and CSA ===
On 7 January 2021, Pivetti was named in charge of Série C side Tombense. On 26 April, he left the club to sign for CSA in the Série B.

On 4 July 2021, Pivetti left CSA on a mutual agreement.

=== Villa Nova ===
On 1 December, Pivetti was announced as new head coach of Villa Nova. He left the club the following 20 February, after accepting an offer from a Série A club.

=== Goiás ===
On 24 February 2022, Goiás announced the signing of Autuori as coordinator, with Pivetti being named head coach. Exactly one month later, after Autuori left, he was sacked.

=== Tombense return and Chapecoense ===
On 13 May 2022, Pivetti returned to Tombense, in the place of sacked Hemerson Maria. On 9 November, he was named in charge of fellow second division side Chapecoense, but was dismissed the following 18 March.

=== Guarani ===
On 27 March 2023, Pivetti was appointed head coach of hometown club Guarani, but was sacked on 8 June.

=== Náutico and Água Santa ===
On 14 August 2023, Pivetti replaced Fernando Marchiori at the helm of Série C side Náutico. He left Timbu fourteen days later, after just two matches, and took over Água Santa on 12 October.

Sacked by Água Santa on 9 June 2024, Pivetti returned to his previous club two days later.

=== CRB ===
On 6 September 2024, Pivetti took over CRB in the second division, but was sacked fourteen days later after three winless matches.

=== Operário Ferroviário ===
On 25 November 2024, Pivetti replaced Rafael Guanaes at the helm of Operário Ferroviário. He won the 2025 Campeonato Paranaense with Operário, but was sacked on 15 June of that year, after a poor run of form.

=== Flamengo ===
On 14 July 2025, Pivetti was presented as head coach of the under-20 team of Flamengo. He led the main squad, already crowned champions, in the last round of the 2025 Série A, as the first team regulars were already travelling for the 2025 FIFA Intercontinental Cup.

=== Third spell at Náutico ===
On 25 September 2026, Pivetti returned to Náutico for a third spell.

== Managerial statistics ==
As of 5 May 2026

Managerial record by team and tenure
Team	Nat	From	To	Record								Ref
Team	Nat	From	To	G	W	D	L	GF	GA	GD	Win %	Ref
Atlético Paranaense (interim)	(Brazil)	4 March 2016	9 March 2016	2	0	1	1	2	3	−1	0.00	
Ferroviária (interim)	(Brazil)	16 May 2018	6 June 2018	2	0	1	1	1	3	−2	0.00	
Vitória	(Brazil)	19 June 2020	7 October 2020	19	4	9	6	24	24	+0	21.05	
Tombense	(Brazil)	7 January 2021	26 April 2021	14	6	6	2	19	11	+8	42.86	
CSA	(Brazil)	26 April 2021	4 July 2021	12	3	5	4	10	9	+1	25.00	
Villa Nova	(Brazil)	1 December 2021	20 February 2022	8	1	6	1	10	9	+1	12.50	
Goiás	(Brazil)	24 February 2022	24 March 2022	7	5	1	1	14	5	+9	71.43	
Tombense	(Brazil)	13 May 2022	9 November 2022	32	10	10	12	33	40	−7	31.25	
Chapecoense	(Brazil)	9 November 2022	18 March 2023	13	5	5	3	16	10	+6	38.46	
Guarani	(Brazil)	27 March 2023	8 June 2023	11	4	3	4	15	11	+4	36.36	
Náutico	(Brazil)	14 August 2023	28 August 2023	2	0	2	0	4	4	+0	0.00	
Água Santa	(Brazil)	12 October 2023	9 June 2024	21	7	7	7	19	21	−2	33.33	
Náutico	(Brazil)	11 June 2024	6 September 2024	12	4	5	3	22	15	+7	33.33	
CRB	(Brazil)	6 September 2024	20 September 2024	3	0	1	2	1	4	−3	0.00	
Operário Ferroviário	(Brazil)	25 November 2024	15 June 2025	32	12	13	7	41	30	+11	37.50	
Flamengo (interim) (Note: Bruno Pivetti was in charge of an under-20 side in the 2025 Campeonato Brasileiro Série A matchday 38, as the main squad was traveling to play the 2025 FIFA Intercontinental Cup in Qatar.)	(Brazil)	6 December 2025	6 December 2025	1	0	1	0	3	3	+0	0.00	
Flamengo (interim)	(Brazil)	11 January 2026	14 January 2026	3	0	1	2	2	6	−4	0.00	
Náutico	(Brazil)	25 September 2026	present	0	0	0	0	0	0	+0	—	
Total				260	100	88	72	381	269	+112	38.46	—

== Honours ==
CSA

- Campeonato Alagoano: 2021

Operário Ferroviário

- Campeonato Paranaense: 2025

Flamengo U20

- Under-20 Intercontinental Cup: 2025
