= Claudinei Oliveira =

Brazilian footballer and manager (born 1969)

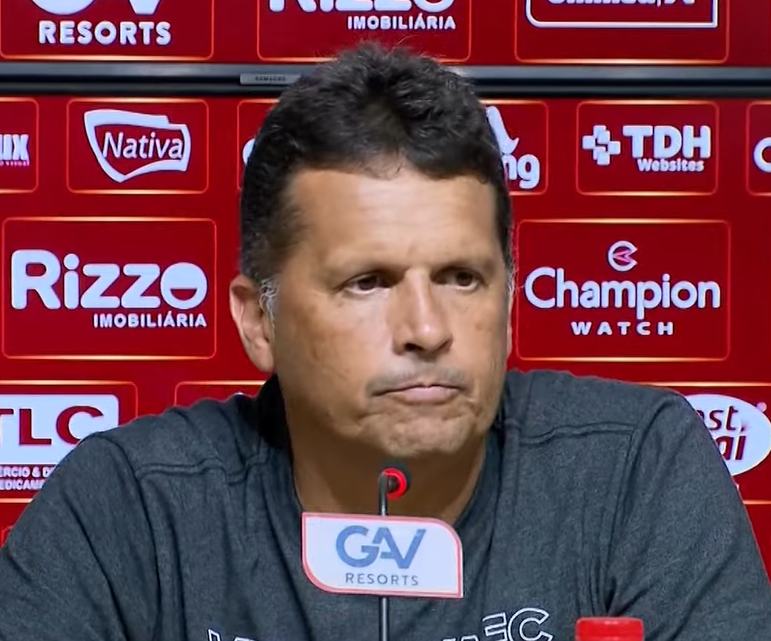
- Oliveira with Vila Nova in 2023

Personal information
- Full name: Claudinei dos Santos Oliveira
- Date of birth: 29 September 1969 (age 57)
- Place of birth: Santos, Brazil
- Height: 1.87 m (6 ft 2 in)
- Position: Goalkeeper

Youth career
- 1984–1985: Portuguesa Santista
- 1986–1988: Santos
- 1988–1989: Palmeirense-SP

Senior career*
Years	Team	Apps	(Gls)
1989–1990	Santos	0	(0)
1991	Jaboticabal		
1992	Nacional de Uberaba		
1993	Mamoré	9	(0)
1993	Araguari		
1994	Central Pinhalense		
1995	Caldense		
1995	Olímpia		
1996–1999	Portuguesa Santista		
1999	→ São Bento (loan)		
2000	Remo	6	(0)
2001	Tuna Luso		
2002	Nacional-SP		
2003	Central Pinhalense		
2003	Ferroviária	12	(0)

Managerial career
- 2009–2013: Santos (youth)
- 2013: Santos
- 2014: Goiás
- 2014: Paraná
- 2014–2015: Atlético Paranaense
- 2015: Vitória
- 2016: Paraná
- 2016–2018: Avaí
- 2018: Sport Recife
- 2018: Paraná
- 2018–2019: Chapecoense
- 2019: Goiás
- 2020: Botafogo-SP
- 2020–2022: Avaí
- 2022: Operário Ferroviário
- 2022: Sport Recife
- 2023: Vila Nova
- 2023–2024: Chapecoense
- 2024: Guarani
- 2024–2025: Londrina
- 2025: Paysandu
- 2025: Ferroviária
- 2026: Santa Cruz
- * Club domestic league appearances and goals

Claudinei dos Santos Oliveira (born 29 September 1969), known as Claudinei Oliveira, is a Brazilian professional football coach and former player who played as a goalkeeper.

== Playing career ==
Born in Santos, São Paulo, Claudinei started his professional career with Santos in 1989, but failed to make an appearance for the club. He subsequently represented Jaboticabal, Nacional de Uberaba, Mamoré, Araguari Atlético Clube, Central Brasileira Pinhalense (two stints), Caldense, Olímpia, Portuguesa Santista, São Bento, Remo, Tuna Luso, Nacional-SP and Ferroviária, retiring with the latter in 2003.

== Coaching career ==
Oliveira began his managerial career as a coach at his first club Santos, joining the under-15 squad in 2009 and leading them to a Campeonato Paulista under-15 title. The following year, he was promoted to under-17s and won the Campeonato Paulista of the category. In 2011, Oliveira was assigned to the under-20s. He went on to win both Campeonato Paulista in 2012 and Copa São Paulo de Futebol Júnior in 2013; the latter came after a 29-year absence.

On 31 May 2013, after Muricy Ramalho's dismissal, Oliveira was appointed manager of the first team in Série A. His first game in charge occurred the following day, a 1–1 home draw against Grêmio, and his first victory came on 12 June, in a 1–0 home defeat of Atlético Mineiro.

Oliveira remained in charge of the main squad until the end of the season, leading the side to a seventh place overall. After being relieved from his duties and being replaced by Oswaldo de Oliveira, he signed with Goiás.

On 14 April 2014, after losing the Campeonato Goiano to Atlético Goianiense, Oliveira was sacked. Two days later, he was appointed manager of Paraná.

On 3 September 2014, Oliveira was appointed at the helm of Atlético Paranaense. Dismissed the following 15 March, he was named Vitória manager two days later, but was sacked on 20 May.

On 25 November 2015, Oliveira returned to Paraná for the ensuing season. He was relieved from his duties on 13 June of the following year, and was named Avaí manager on 25 August.

Oliveira managed to achieve a top-tier promotion in his first season, but suffered immediate relegation in his second. On 19 April 2018, he was sacked.

On 25 April 2018, Oliveira replaced sacked Nelsinho Baptista at the helm of Sport Recife. On 12 August, after a 3–1 home loss against São Paulo, he left the club, and returned to Paraná for a third spell three days later.

On 16 October 2018, Oliveira resigned from Paraná and moved to fellow first division strugglers Chapecoense. Despite avoiding relegation at the end of the season, he was sacked the following 17 March, and returned to Goiás on 23 April; on 4 August, after a 6–1 loss to former side Santos, he was dismissed.

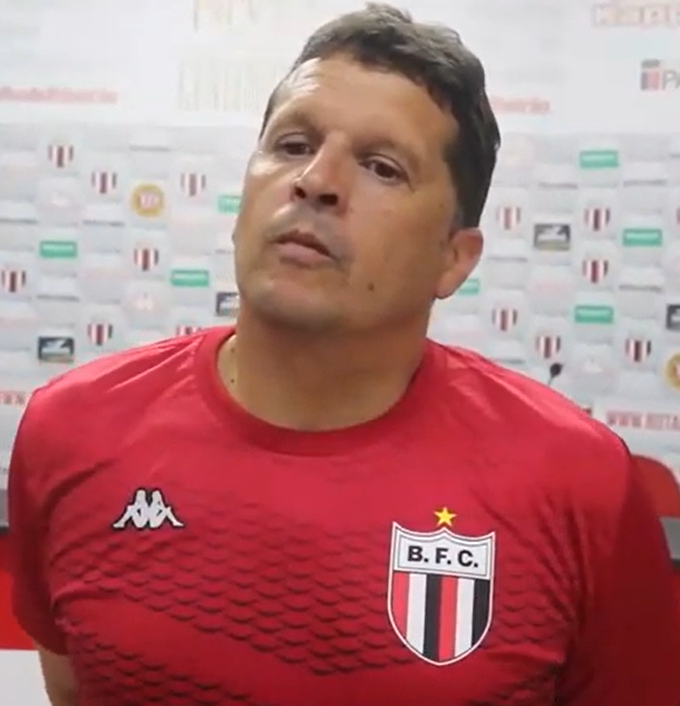
Oliveira with Botafogo-SP in 2020

On 17 February 2020, Oliveira was appointed manager of Botafogo-SP, replacing sacked Wagner Lopes. He helped the club avoid relegation in the 2020 Campeonato Paulista, but resigned on 20 November after only five wins in 22 matches.

On 9 December 2020, Oliveira returned to Avaí in the place of Geninho. He again led the club to another promotion to the first division in 2021, but was sacked on 6 February 2022, after a poor start of the new campaign.

Oliveira was named in charge of Operário Ferroviário on 20 March 2022, but was sacked exactly four months later. On 24 July, he returned to Sport after nearly four years, and left on a mutual agreement on 16 November, after failing to achieve promotion.

On 1 December 2022, Oliveira was appointed manager of Vila Nova also in the second division. He was dismissed on 4 August 2023, after a poor run of form which took the club from the first to the seventh position, and returned to Chape five days later.

Sacked from Chapecoense on 10 February 2024, Oliveira was named head coach of Guarani two days later. He was also dismissed on 27 April, after a poor start in the 2024 Série B, and took over Londrina in the Série C on 15 May.

On 4 June 2025, Oliveira resigned from Londrina to take over Paysandu in the second division. He was sacked on 5 September, with the club in the last position, and took over fellow league team Ferroviária fourteen days later.

On 10 November 2025, Oliveira was dismissed from AFE. On 24 February of the following year, he took over Santa Cruz in the third division, but was sacked less than three months later on 3 May.

== Managerial statistics ==
As of 4 May 2026

Managerial record by team and tenure
Team	Nat	From	To	Record								Ref
Team	Nat	From	To	G	W	D	L	GF	GA	GD	Win %	Ref
Santos	(Brazil)	31 May 2013	8 December 2013	40	17	12	11	54	39	+15	42.50	
Goiás	(Brazil)	14 December 2013	14 April 2014	19	11	6	2	33	12	+21	57.89	
Paraná	(Brazil)	16 April 2014	3 September 2014	22	7	7	8	25	24	+1	31.82	
Atlético Paranaense	(Brazil)	3 September 2014	15 March 2015	24	9	4	11	20	21	−1	37.50	
Vitória	(Brazil)	17 March 2015	20 May 2015	11	4	5	2	15	14	+1	36.36	
Paraná	(Brazil)	25 November 2015	13 June 2016	27	12	8	7	33	29	+4	44.44	
Avaí	(Brazil)	25 August 2016	19 April 2018	102	44	29	29	115	103	+12	43.14	
Sport Recife	(Brazil)	25 April 2018	12 August 2018	16	5	4	7	18	23	−5	31.25	
Paraná	(Brazil)	15 August 2018	16 October 2018	11	0	3	8	3	19	−16	0.00	
Chapecoense	(Brazil)	16 October 2018	17 March 2019	24	11	6	7	23	23	+0	45.83	
Goiás	(Brazil)	23 April 2019	4 August 2019	12	5	2	5	13	20	−7	41.67	
Botafogo-SP	(Brazil)	17 February 2020	20 November 2020	30	9	4	17	21	31	−10	30.00	
Avaí	(Brazil)	9 December 2020	6 February 2022	74	35	21	18	80	58	+22	47.30	
Operário Ferroviário	(Brazil)	20 March 2022	20 July 2022	20	5	6	9	20	24	−4	25.00	
Sport Recife	(Brazil)	24 July 2022	16 November 2022	18	9	3	6	24	19	+5	50.00	
Vila Nova	(Brazil)	14 December 2022	3 August 2023	35	13	12	10	36	22	+14	37.14	
Chapecoense	(Brazil)	10 August 2023	10 February 2024	21	5	6	10	21	25	−4	23.81	
Guarani	(Brazil)	12 February 2024	27 April 2024	14	2	5	7	13	19	−6	14.29	
Londrina	(Brazil)	15 May 2024	4 June 2025	45	20	13	12	64	46	+18	44.44	
Paysandu	(Brazil)	4 June 2025	5 September 2025	14	4	5	5	16	17	−1	28.57	
Ferroviária	(Brazil)	19 September 2025	10 November 2025	9	1	5	3	11	14	−3	11.11	
Santa Cruz	(Brazil)	24 February 2026	3 May 2026	6	1	2	3	2	4	−2	16.67	
Total				594	229	168	197	660	606	+54	38.55	—
