= Marcelo Chamusca =

Brazilian footballer

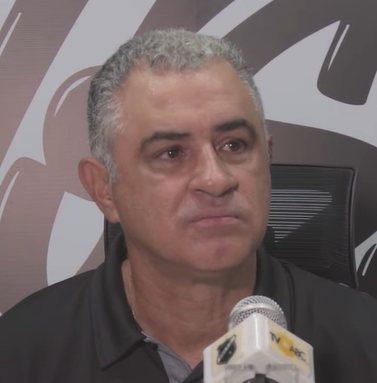
- Chamusca in 2026

Personal information
- Full name: Marcelo Augusto Oliveira Chamusca
- Date of birth: 7 October 1966 (age 60)
- Place of birth: Salvador, Brazil
- Height: 1.79 m (5 ft 10 in)
- Position: Defensive midfielder

Team information
- Current team: Itabaiana (head coach)

Youth career
- 1979–1986: Bahia

Senior career*
Years	Team	Apps	(Gls)
1987–1988	Bahia		
- Galícia
- Treze
–1993	Colatina		

Managerial career
- 1993–1998: Vitória U20
- 1998–2000: Sport Recife U20
- 2000–2002: Bahia U20
- 2004: CRB
- 2004: São Caetano (assistant)
- 2005: Bahia (assistant)
- 2005: Goiás (assistant)
- 2005: Botafogo (assistant)
- 2005–2009: Oita Trinita (assistant)
- 2009: Sport (assistant)
- 2010: Avaí (assistant)
- 2010: Al-Arabi (assistant)
- 2011–2012: El Jaish (assistant)
- 2012: Vitória da Conquista
- 2012–2013: Salgueiro
- 2014: Fortaleza
- 2015: Atlético Goianiense
- 2015: Fortaleza
- 2016: Sampaio Corrêa
- 2016: Guarani
- 2017: Paysandu
- 2017–2018: Ceará
- 2018: Ponte Preta
- 2019: Vitória
- 2019: CRB
- 2019–2020: Cuiabá
- 2020–2021: Fortaleza
- 2021: Botafogo
- 2021: Náutico
- 2022: Guarani
- 2023: Tombense
- 2023: Botafogo-SP
- 2023–2024: Al-Faisaly
- 2025: Floresta
- 2025: Tombense
- 2026: ABC
- 2026–: Itabaiana
- * Club domestic league appearances and goals

Marcelo Augusto Oliveira Chamusca (born 7 October 1966) is a Brazilian professional football coach and former player who played as a defensive midfielder. He is the current head coach of Itabaiana.

Chamusca is known for being the only head coach who achieved promotions from all tiers of the Campeonato Brasileiro.

== Playing career ==
Born in Salvador, Bahia, Chamusca was a Bahia youth graduate. After spending two years in the first team, he subsequently represented Galícia, Treze and Associação Atlética Colatina, retiring with the latter in 1993.

== Coach career ==
Immediately after retiring, Chamusca joined Bahia's fierce rivals Vitória's youth setup. In 2000, after a two-year spell at Sport, he returned to Bahia.

Chamusca moved to the assistant role in 2002, and was a director of football of Palmeiras do Nordeste in the following year. His first managerial experience came in 2004, while in charge of CRB.

In July 2004, Chamusca was appointed his brother's assistant at São Caetano. He remained an assistant at Bahia, Goiás, Botafogo, Oita Trinita, Sport, Avaí, Al-Arabi and El Jaish before returning to Brazil in 2012 and being appointed Vitória da Conquista manager.

Chamusca was appointed manager of Salgueiro on 30 November 2012, and achieved promotion in the 2013 Série D.

On 25 November 2013, Chamusca was named at the helm of Fortaleza. After narrowly missing out promotion, he resigned and joined Atlético Goianiense; his reign at the latter only lasted two months, and he returned to Fortaleza on 2 March 2015.

On 4 December 2015, Chamusca was named Sampaio Corrêa manager. Dismissed the following 3 March, he was presented at Guarani on 15 April.

After achieving promotion to the Série B, Chamusca was appointed manager of Paysandu on 2 December 2016. The following 18 June, he resigned and moved to fellow second division team Ceará, and achieved a top tier promotion in the end of the season; by doing so, he became the first manager to achieve promotions in all national tiers of Brazilian football.

On 21 May 2018, Chamusca was sacked by Ceará. On 2 September, he took over Ponte Preta, but was sacked late in the month.

On 14 October 2019, after unsuccessful spells at Vitória and CRB, Chamusca was named in charge of Cuiabá also in the second division. On 11 November of the following year, after impressing with the club in the 2020 Copa do Brasil, he replaced Rogério Ceni at the helm of top tier side Fortaleza, returning to the club for a third spell after nearly five years.

On 7 January 2021, Chamusca was sacked after a poor run of form. On 19 February, he was named at the helm of recently relegated side Botafogo for the 2021 campaign.

On 13 July 2021, after a poor run of form, Chamusca was sacked by Bota. On 18 August, he replaced Hélio dos Anjos at Náutico also in the second division, but left on a mutual agreement on 22 September.

On 18 May 2022, Chamusca returned to Guarani after nearly six years, but was sacked on 25 June after only six matches. On 9 November, he was named in charge of Tombense.

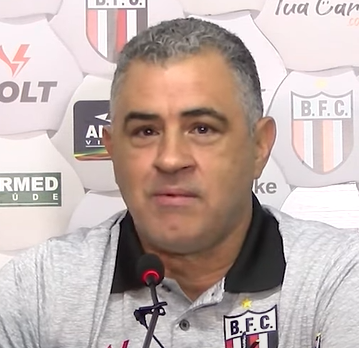
Chamusca as head coach of Botafogo-SP in 2023

Chamusca was sacked by Tombense on 5 June 2023, with the club in the relegation zone of the 2023 Série B. He took over fellow league team Botafogo-SP on 25 June, replacing sacked Adilson Batista.

On 13 November 2023, Chamusca left Bota after accepting an offer from a Saudi club, which was revealed to be Al-Faisaly three days later. On 13 December of the following year, he took over Floresta.

On 5 March 2025, Chamusca was dismissed after only avoiding relegation in the year's Campeonato Cearense. On 13 July, he returned to Tombense.

On 22 September 2025, Chamusca was confirmed as ABC's head coach for the upcoming season. Sacked the following 22 March after losing the Campeonato Potiguar title on penalties, he took over Itabaiana on 6 May 2026.

== Personal life ==
Chamusca's older brother, Péricles, is also a former footballer and current manager.

== Honours ==
=== Player ===
Bahia

- Campeonato Baiano U-17: 1985, 1986
- Campeonato Baiano: 1987, 1988

=== Manager ===
Fortaleza

- Campeonato Cearense: 2015

Paysandu

- Campeonato Paraense: 2017

Ceará

- Campeonato Cearense: 2018

Cuiabá

- Copa Verde: 2019
