= 2022 Campeonato Brasileiro Série B =

Football competition held in Brazil

Campeonato Brasileiro Série B
- Season: 2022
- Dates: 8 April – 6 November
- Champions: Cruzeiro (1st title)
- Promoted: Bahia; Cruzeiro; Grêmio; Vasco da Gama
- Relegated: Brusque; CSA; Náutico; Operário Ferroviário
- Matches: 380
- Goals: 766 (2.02 per match)
- Top goalscorer: Gabriel Poveda (19 goals)
- Biggest home win: Novorizontino 6–0 Náutico; R35, 14 October
- Biggest away win: Novorizontino 0–3 Chapecoense; R4, 26 April; Guarani 0–3 Operário Ferroviário; R11, 6 June; Chapecoense 0–3 Londrina; R10, 5 July; Ponte Preta 1–4 Cruzeiro; R32, 28 September; Náutico 0–3 Grêmio; R36, 23 October; Novorizontino 1–4 Cruzeiro; R37, 27 October; Operário Ferroviário 0–3 Novorizontino; R38, 6 November
- Highest scoring: 7 goals Náutico 4–3 Tombense; R33, 4 October
- Longest winning run: 8 games Cruzeiro
- Longest unbeaten run: 17 games Grêmio
- Longest winless run: 13 games Vila Nova
- Longest losing run: 6 games Brusque; Náutico
- Highest attendance: 58,659; Vasco da Gama 1–0 Cruzeiro; R12, 12 June
- Lowest attendance: 114; Tombense 2–0 Novorizontino; R32, 29 September
- Total attendance: 3,595,735
- Average attendance: 9,462

The 2022 Campeonato Brasileiro Série B (officially the Brasileirão SportingBet - Série B 2022 for sponsorship reasons) was a football competition held in Brazil, equivalent to the second division. The competition began on 8 April and ended on 6 November.

Twenty teams competed in the tournament, twelve returning from the 2021 season, four promoted from the 2021 Campeonato Brasileiro Série C (Criciúma, Ituano, Novorizontino and Tombense), and four relegated from the 2021 Campeonato Brasileiro Série A (Bahia, Chapecoense, Grêmio and Sport).

The top four teams were promoted to the 2023 Campeonato Brasileiro Série A. Cruzeiro became the first club to be promoted on 21 September 2022 after a 3–0 win against Vasco da Gama. Grêmio were promoted on 23 October 2022, and Bahia and Vasco da Gama were promoted on 6 November 2022.

Brusque, CSA, Náutico and Operário Ferroviário were relegated to the 2023 Campeonato Brasileiro Série C.

The match Sport v Vasco da Gama, played on 16 October 2022 (1–1, 35th round), ended in the 49th minute of the second half, 8 minutes before the end of injury time. Before the suspension of the match, Raniel (Vasco da Gama) scored a penalty goal and during his celebration, close to the Sport fans, objects were thrown onto the field of play towards the players. After this, an invasion of many fans began and the match was suspended. The referee Raphael Claus waited 50 minutes before decide to end of the match.

On 9 November 2022, Sport were sanctioned by the Superior Tribunal de Justiça Desportiva (STJD) with a fine of R$180,000, eight host matches behind closed doors and the loss of one point, while Vasco da Gama received two additional points. The STJD partially overruled their decision, on 31 January 2023, and the sanction was reduced to R$150,000 and six host matches behind closed doors.

== Teams ==
Twenty teams competed in the league – twelve teams from the previous season, as well as four teams promoted from the Série C, and four teams relegated from the Série A.

Criciúma, Ituano, Novorizontino and Tombense achieved promotion on 7 November 2021, after knocking out Botafogo-PB and Paysandu from the Group A, and Manaus and Ypiranga from the Group B.

Chapecoense became the first team relegated on 10 November 2021, after Santos defeated Bragantino. Sport suffered relegation on 30 November, after Juventude also defeated Bragantino, with Grêmio and Bahia being relegated in the last round on 9 December, despite the former's win over champions Atlético Mineiro.

Location of teams in 2022 Série B

Pos.	Relegated from 2021 Série A
17th	Grêmio
18th	Bahia
19th	Sport
20th	Chapecoense

Pos.	Promoted from 2021 Série C
1st	Ituano
2nd	Tombense
3rd	Novorizontino
4th	Criciúma

=== Number of teams by state ===
Number of teams	State	Team(s)
4	São Paulo	Guarani, Ituano, Novorizontino and Ponte Preta
3	Santa Catarina	Brusque, Chapecoense and Criciúma
2	Alagoas	CRB and CSA
2	Minas Gerais	Cruzeiro and Tombense
2	Paraná	Londrina and Operário Ferroviário
2	Pernambuco	Náutico and Sport
1	Bahia	Bahia
1	Goiás	Vila Nova
1	Maranhão	Sampaio Corrêa
1	Rio de Janeiro	Vasco da Gama
1	Rio Grande do Sul	Grêmio

=== Stadiums and locations ===
Team	Home city	State	Stadium	Capacity
Bahia	Salvador	Bahia	Arena Fonte Nova	47,907
Brusque	Brusque	Santa Catarina	Augusto Bauer	5,000
Brusque	Brusque	Santa Catarina	Ressacada (Florianópolis)	17,826
Chapecoense	Chapecó	Santa Catarina	Arena Condá	20,089
CRB	Maceió	Alagoas	Rei Pelé	17,126
Criciúma	Criciúma	Santa Catarina	Heriberto Hülse	19,300
Cruzeiro	Belo Horizonte	Minas Gerais	Mineirão	61,846
Cruzeiro	Belo Horizonte	Minas Gerais	Independência	23,018
Cruzeiro	Belo Horizonte	Minas Gerais	Arena BRB Mané Garrincha (Brasília)	72,788
CSA	Maceió	Alagoas	Rei Pelé	17,126
Grêmio	Porto Alegre	Rio Grande do Sul	Arena do Grêmio	55,225
Guarani	Campinas	São Paulo	Brinco de Ouro	29,130
Guarani	Campinas	São Paulo	Arena da Amazônia (Manaus)	44,000
Ituano	Itu	São Paulo	Novelli Júnior	18,560
Londrina	Londrina	Paraná	Estádio do Café	31,000
Náutico	Recife	Pernambuco	Aflitos	22,856
Náutico	Recife	Pernambuco	Arruda	60,044
Novorizontino	Novo Horizonte	São Paulo	Doutor Jorge Ismael de Biasi	16,000
Operário Ferroviário	Ponta Grossa	Paraná	Germano Krüger	10,632
Ponte Preta	Campinas	São Paulo	Moisés Lucarelli	19,728
Sampaio Corrêa	São Luís	Maranhão	Castelão	40,149
Sport	Recife	Pernambuco	Ilha do Retiro	32,983
Sport	Recife	Pernambuco	Arena Pernambuco (São Lourenço da Mata)	44,300
Tombense	Tombos	Minas Gerais	Almeidão	3,050
Tombense	Tombos	Minas Gerais	Soares de Azevedo (Muriaé)	13,971
Vasco da Gama	Rio de Janeiro	Rio de Janeiro	São Januário	24,584
Vasco da Gama	Rio de Janeiro	Rio de Janeiro	Maracanã	78,838
Vila Nova	Goiânia	Goiás	Onésio Brasileiro Alvarenga	6,500
Vila Nova	Goiânia	Goiás	Serra Dourada	42,000

== Personnel and kits ==
Team	Manager	Captain	Kit manufacturer	Main kit sponsor
Bahia	(Brazil) Eduardo Barroca	(Brazil) Daniel	Esquadrão (club manufactured kit)	Casa de Apostas
Brusque	(Brazil) Gilson Kleina	(Brazil) Wallace	Finta	Havan
Chapecoense	(Brazil) Gilmar Dal Pozzo	(Brazil) Victor Ramos	Umbro	Aurora
CRB	(Brazil) Daniel Barboza (caretaker)	(Brazil) Gum	Regatas (club manufactured kit)	Champion Watch
Criciúma	(Brazil) Cláudio Tencati	(Brazil) Rodrigo	Volt Sport	Delupo Ferragens
Cruzeiro	(Uruguay) Paulo Pezzolano	(Brazil) Eduardo Brock	Adidas	Supermercados BH
CSA	(Brazil) Adriano Rodrigues (caretaker)	(Brazil) Gabriel	Volt Sport	Champion Watch
Grêmio	(Brazil) Renato Gaúcho	(Brazil) Pedro Geromel	Umbro	Banrisul
Guarani	(Brazil) Mozart	(Brazil) Kozlinski	Kappa	Champion Watch
Ituano	(Brazil) Carlos Pimentel	(Brazil) Rafael Pereira	Kanxa	PixBet
Londrina	(Brazil) Adílson Batista	(Brazil) João Paulo	Karilu	PADO
Náutico	(Brazil) Dado Cavalcanti	(Brazil) Victor Ferraz	NSeis (club manufactured kit), Adidas	Betnacional
Novorizontino	(Brazil) Mazola Júnior	(Brazil) Paulinho	Physicus	Açúcar Santa Isabel
Operário Ferroviário	(Brazil) Sandro Forner (caretaker)	(Brazil) Vanderlei	Karilu	Fibraplac, Philco
Ponte Preta	(Brazil) Hélio dos Anjos	(Brazil) Lucca	1900 (club manufactured kit)	PixBet
Sampaio Corrêa	(Brazil) Léo Condé	(Brazil) Ferreira	Super Bolla	VITALMED
Sport	(Brazil) Claudinei Oliveira	(Brazil) Rafael Thyere	Umbro	Betnacional
Tombense	(Brazil) Bruno Pivetti	(Brazil) Roger Carvalho	Vettor	ValSports
Vasco da Gama	(Brazil) Jorginho	(Brazil) Anderson Conceição	Kappa	PixBet
Vila Nova	(Brazil) Allan Aal	(Brazil) Rafael Donato	V43 (club manufactured kit)	Champion Watch

=== Managerial changes ===
Team	Outgoing manager	Manner of departure	Date of vacancy	Position in table	Incoming manager	Date of appointment	Ref.
Londrina	(Brazil) Márcio Fernandes	End of contract	3 December 2021	Pre-season	(Brazil) Vinícius Eutrópio	6 December 2021	
Vasco da Gama	(Brazil) Fábio Cortez	End of caretaker spell	4 December 2021	Pre-season	(Brazil) Zé Ricardo	4 December 2021	
Chapecoense	(Brazil) Felipe Endres	End of caretaker spell	9 December 2021	Pre-season	(Brazil) Felipe Conceição	15 December 2021	
Cruzeiro	(Brazil) Vanderlei Luxemburgo	Sacked	28 December 2021	Pre-season	(Uruguay) Paulo Pezzolano	3 January 2022	
Novorizontino	(Brazil) Léo Condé	Sacked	6 February 2022	State leagues	(Brazil) Júlio Kenaifes (caretaker)	9 February 2022	
CRB	(Brazil) Allan Aal	Sacked	10 February 2022	State leagues	(Brazil) Marcelo Cabo	10 February 2022	
Náutico	(Brazil) Hélio dos Anjos	Sacked	11 February 2022	State leagues	(Brazil) Marcelo Rocha (caretaker)	11 February 2022	
Novorizontino	(Brazil) Júlio Kenaifes	End of caretaker spell	12 February 2022	State leagues	(Brazil) Allan Aal	12 February 2022	
Chapecoense	(Brazil) Felipe Conceição	Resigned	13 February 2022	State leagues	(Brazil) Bolívar (caretaker)	13 February 2022	
Náutico	(Brazil) Marcelo Rocha	End of caretaker spell	13 February 2022	State leagues	(Brazil) Felipe Conceição	13 February 2022	
Grêmio	(Brazil) Vagner Mancini	Sacked	14 February 2022	State leagues	(Brazil) Roger Machado	14 February 2022	
Ponte Preta	(Brazil) Gilson Kleina	Sacked	19 February 2022	State leagues	(Brazil) Nenê Santana (caretaker)	21 February 2022	
Tombense	(Brazil) Rafael Guanaes	Sacked	22 February 2022	State leagues	(Brazil) Hemerson Maria	22 February 2022	
Ponte Preta	(Brazil) Nenê Santana	End of caretaker spell	23 February 2022	State leagues	(Brazil) Hélio dos Anjos	23 February 2022	
Sport	(Paraguay) Gustavo Florentín	Sacked	3 March 2022	State leagues	(Brazil) César Lucena (caretaker)	5 March 2022	
Londrina	(Brazil) Vinícius Eutrópio	Sacked	3 March 2022	State leagues	(Brazil) Edinho (caretaker)	3 March 2022	
Londrina	(Brazil) Edinho	End of caretaker spell	6 March 2022	State leagues	(Brazil) Adílson Batista	6 March 2022	
Sport	(Brazil) César Lucena	End of caretaker spell	12 March 2022	State leagues	(Brazil) Gilmar Dal Pozzo	12 March 2022	
Operário Ferroviário	(Brazil) Ricardo Catalá	Mutual agreement	19 March 2022	State leagues	(Brazil) Claudinei Oliveira	20 March 2022	
Chapecoense	(Brazil) Bolívar	End of caretaker spell	20 March 2022	State leagues	(Brazil) Gilson Kleina	20 March 2022	
Sampaio Corrêa	(Brazil) João Brigatti	Sacked	20 March 2022	State leagues	(Brazil) Léo Condé	21 March 2022	
Náutico	(Brazil) Felipe Conceição	Sacked	11 April 2022	19th	(Brazil) Dudu Capixaba (caretaker)	13 April 2022	
Náutico	(Brazil) Dudu Capixaba	End of caretaker spell	17 April 2022	19th	(Brazil) Roberto Fernandes	17 April 2022	
Guarani	(Brazil) Daniel Paulista	Mutual agreement	4 May 2022	5th	(Brazil) Ben-Hur Moreira (caretaker)	4 May 2022	
Tombense	(Brazil) Hemerson Maria	Sacked	12 May 2022	19th	(Brazil) Bruno Pivetti	13 May 2022	
CRB	(Brazil) Marcelo Cabo	Mutual agreement	14 May 2022	20th	(Brazil) Daniel Paulista	14 May 2022	
Vila Nova	(Brazil) Higo Magalhães	Sacked	15 May 2022	16th	(Brazil) Dado Cavalcanti	15 May 2022	
Brusque	(Brazil) Waguinho Dias	Sacked	15 May 2022	14th	(Brazil) Luan Carlos	16 May 2022	
Guarani	(Brazil) Ben-Hur Moreira	End of caretaker spell	19 May 2022	20th	(Brazil) Marcelo Chamusca	18 May 2022	
Vasco da Gama	(Brazil) Zé Ricardo	Resigned	5 June 2022	4th	(Brazil) Emílio Faro (caretaker)	6 June 2022	
Vasco da Gama	(Brazil) Emílio Faro	End of caretaker spell	13 June 2022	3rd	(Brazil) Maurício Souza	13 June 2022	
CSA	(Brazil) Mozart	Resigned	13 June 2022	15th	(Brazil) Alberto Valentim	15 June 2022	
Novorizontino	(Brazil) Allan Aal	Sacked	18 June 2022	15th	(Brazil) Rafael Guanaes	21 June 2022	
Guarani	(Brazil) Marcelo Chamusca	Sacked	25 June 2022	19th	(Brazil) Mozart (Note: Ben-Hur Moreira was the caretaker manager on the 15th round against Ituano.)	28 June 2022	
Bahia	(Brazil) Guto Ferreira	Sacked	26 June 2022	4th	(Brazil) Enderson Moreira	26 June 2022	
Sport	(Brazil) Gilmar Dal Pozzo	Sacked	26 June 2022	5th	(Brazil) Lisca (Note: César Lucena was the caretaker manager on the 15th round against Cruzeiro.)	27 June 2022	
Vila Nova	(Brazil) Dado Cavalcanti	Sacked	2 July 2022	20th	(Brazil) Allan Aal	2 July 2022	
Chapecoense	(Brazil) Gilson Kleina	Sacked	5 July 2022	15th	(Brazil) Marcelo Cabo (Note: Bolívar was the caretaker manager on the 17th round against Tombense.)	7 July 2022	
Ituano	(Brazil) Mazola Júnior	Sacked	12 July 2022	16th	(Brazil) Carlos Pimentel (Note: Originally as caretaker manager, appointed on a permanent basis on 23 August 2022.)	15 July 2022	
Náutico	(Brazil) Roberto Fernandes	Sacked	17 July 2022	18th	(Brazil) Dudu Capixaba (caretaker)	18 July 2022	
Sport	(Brazil) Lisca	Signed by Santos	19 July 2022	5th	(Brazil) César Lucena (caretaker)	19 July 2022	
Náutico	(Brazil) Dudu Capixaba	End of caretaker spell	20 July 2022	18th	(Brazil) Elano	20 July 2022	
Operário Ferroviário	(Brazil) Claudinei Oliveira	Sacked	20 July 2022	15th	(Brazil) Sandro Forner (caretaker)	21 July 2022	
Vasco da Gama	(Brazil) Maurício Souza	Sacked	24 July 2022	3rd	(Brazil) Emílio Faro (caretaker)	24 July 2022	
Sport	(Brazil) César Lucena	End of caretaker spell	24 July 2022	9th	(Brazil) Claudinei Oliveira	24 July 2022	
Operário Ferroviário	(Brazil) Sandro Forner	End of caretaker spell	26 July 2022	16th	(Brazil) Matheus Costa	26 July 2022	
CSA	(Brazil) Alberto Valentim	Sacked	8 August 2022	17th	(Brazil) Roberto Fernandes (Note: Adriano Rodrigues was the caretaker manager on the 22nd round against Brusque.)	8 August 2022	
Náutico	(Brazil) Elano	Sacked	21 August 2022	20th	(Brazil) Dado Cavalcanti	21 August 2022	
Chapecoense	(Brazil) Marcelo Cabo	Sacked	30 August 2022	15th	(Brazil) Gilmar Dal Pozzo	31 August 2022	
Brusque	(Brazil) Luan Carlos	Sacked	31 August 2022	16th	(Brazil) Gilson Kleina	1 September 2022	
Grêmio	(Brazil) Roger Machado	Sacked	1 September 2022	4th	(Brazil) Renato Gaúcho (Note: César Lopes was the caretaker manager on the 28th round against Vila Nova.)	1 September 2022	
Novorizontino	(Brazil) Rafael Guanaes	Sacked	3 September 2022	13th	(Brazil) Mazola Júnior	3 September 2022	
Vasco da Gama	(Brazil) Emílio Faro	End of caretaker spell	5 September 2022	4th	(Brazil) Jorginho	5 September 2022	
Bahia	(Brazil) Enderson Moreira	Sacked	1 October 2022	3rd	(Brazil) Eduardo Barroca	2 October 2022	
CSA	(Brazil) Roberto Fernandes	Sacked	14 October 2022	17th	(Brazil) Adriano Rodrigues (caretaker)	14 October 2022	
Operário Ferroviário	(Brazil) Matheus Costa	Mutual agreement	24 October 2022	18th	(Brazil) Sandro Forner (caretaker)	24 October 2022	
CRB	(Brazil) Daniel Paulista	Sacked	3 November 2022	10th	(Brazil) Daniel Barboza (caretaker)	3 November 2022	

=== Foreign players ===
The clubs could have a maximum of five foreign players in their Campeonato Brasileiro squads per match, but there was no limit of foreigners in the clubs' squads.

Club	Player 1	Player 2	Player 3	Player 4	Player 5
Bahia	(Argentina) Lucas Mugni	(Colombia) Hugo Rodallega	(Colombia) Jonathan Copete	(China) Ricardo Goulart	
Brusque					
Chapecoense	(Ecuador) Carlos Orejuela				
CRB					
Criciúma					
Cruzeiro	(Uruguay) Leonardo Pais	(Uruguay) Pablo Siles			
CSA					
Grêmio	(Argentina) Walter Kannemann	(Colombia) Jaminton Campaz	(Paraguay) Mathías Villasanti	(Colombia) Kevin Quejada	(China) Elkeson
Guarani	(Colombia) Richard Ríos	(Bolivia) Bruno Miranda	(Argentina) Alexis Alvariño		
Ituano	(Colombia) Elacio Córdoba	(Paraguay) Jorge Jiménez			
Londrina	(Cameroon) Toni Nang	(Nigeria) Samuel Oti			
Náutico	(Paraguay) Richard Franco				
Novorizontino	(Argentina) Diego Torres				
Operário Ferroviário	(Colombia) Javier Reina				
Ponte Preta					
Sampaio Corrêa					
Sport	(Uruguay) Lucas Hernández	(Paraguay) Blas Cáceres	(Argentina) Nicolás Watson	(Chile) Javier Parraguez	(Colombia) Ray Vanegas
Tombense					
Vasco	(Argentina) Martín Sarrafiore	(Colombia) Juan Quintero	(Chile) Carlos Palacios		
Vila Nova					

==== Players holding Brazilian dual nationality ====
They do not take foreign slot.

- (Belarus) Renan Bressan (Criciúma)
- (Italy) Rômulo (Cruzeiro)
- (Moldova) Henrique Luvannor (Cruzeiro)

== League table ==
Pos	Team	Pld	W	D	L	GF	GA	GD	Pts	Promotion or relegation
1	Cruzeiro (C, P)	38	23	9	6	57	26	+31	78	Promotion to 2023 Campeonato Brasileiro Série A
2	Grêmio (P)	38	17	14	7	50	26	+24	65	Promotion to 2023 Campeonato Brasileiro Série A
3	Bahia (P)	38	17	11	10	43	29	+14	62	Promotion to 2023 Campeonato Brasileiro Série A
4	Vasco da Gama (P)	38	17	11	10	48	36	+12	62	Promotion to 2023 Campeonato Brasileiro Série A
5	Sampaio Corrêa	38	16	10	12	48	42	+6	58	
6	Ituano	38	15	12	11	42	34	+8	57	
7	Sport	38	15	12	11	37	31	+6	57	
8	Criciúma	38	14	14	10	43	31	+12	56	
9	Londrina	38	14	11	13	36	37	−1	53	
10	Guarani	38	13	12	13	33	36	−3	51	
11	CRB	38	13	11	14	35	43	−8	50	
12	Ponte Preta	38	12	13	13	34	36	−2	49	
13	Vila Nova	38	9	20	9	28	31	−3	47	
14	Chapecoense	38	11	12	15	37	39	−2	45	
15	Tombense	38	10	15	13	38	47	−9	45	
16	Novorizontino	38	11	11	16	44	49	−5	44	
17	CSA (R)	38	9	15	14	29	37	−8	42	Relegation to 2023 Campeonato Brasileiro Série C
18	Brusque (R)	38	8	10	20	21	38	−17	34	Relegation to 2023 Campeonato Brasileiro Série C
19	Operário Ferroviário (R)	38	7	13	18	31	53	−22	34	Relegation to 2023 Campeonato Brasileiro Série C
20	Náutico (R)	38	8	6	24	32	65	−33	30	Relegation to 2023 Campeonato Brasileiro Série C

Source: CBF
Rules for classification: 1) points; 2) wins; 3) goal difference; 4) goals scored; 5) head-to-head results (only between 2 teams); 6) fewest red cards; 7) fewest yellow cards; 8) drawing of lots.
(C) Champions; (P) Promoted; (R) Relegated

=== Positions by round ===
The table lists the positions of teams after each week of matches. In order to preserve chronological evolvements, any postponed matches were not included to the round at which they were originally scheduled, but added to the full round they were played immediately afterwards.

Team ╲ Round	1	2	3	4	5	6	7	8	9	10	11	12	13	14	15	16	17	18	19	20	21	22	23	24	25	26	27	28	29	30	31	32	33	34	35	36	37	38
Bahia	1	1	1	1	2	1	3	2	3	2	2	2	3	3	3	3	3	3	3	4	3	2	3	2	2	2	2	2	2	2	3	3	3	3	3	4	3	3
Brusque	4	7	13	6	10	12	14	8	12	15	8	13	7	10	13	8	12	12	12	12	14	14	14	14	15	15	16	15	16	18	18	19	19	19	19	19	18	18
Chapecoense	5	3	3	2	4	6	10	10	10	14	16	18	13	14	15	14	15	13	13	14	15	16	15	15	14	14	15	14	14	14	15	13	15	15	16	15	14	14
CRB	13	13	19	20	20	20	20	19	13	13	17	11	12	9	11	10	9	9	10	8	10	10	12	9	7	8	11	7	8	9	11	12	11	10	10	10	10	11
Criciúma	14	6	8	12	13	14	8	9	15	17	9	6	9	7	7	5	7	8	11	9	9	9	10	12	11	11	9	9	10	10	9	8	9	8	7	9	9	8
Cruzeiro	20	8	10	5	3	2	1	1	1	1	1	1	1	1	1	1	1	1	1	1	1	1	1	1	1	1	1	1	1	1	1	1	1	1	1	1	1	1
CSA	15	15	17	18	15	15	18	18	11	11	11	15	16	15	17	17	19	17	17	17	17	17	17	18	16	16	14	16	15	17	17	17	17	17	17	17	16	17
Grêmio	11	17	6	4	1	4	6	6	5	5	5	5	4	4	4	4	4	4	4	2	4	3	2	3	3	3	4	3	3	3	2	2	2	2	2	2	2	2
Guarani	18	18	20	14	17	16	17	17	20	20	20	19	18	19	19	19	18	19	19	18	18	18	19	17	19	18	19	18	19	16	16	14	13	14	13	11	11	10
Ituano	9	12	2	9	5	9	7	11	14	16	18	14	14	16	14	16	14	15	16	13	12	12	9	11	10	7	8	10	6	7	6	5	7	6	8	5	5	6
Londrina	2	5	7	11	12	18	13	15	9	12	14	10	11	8	12	13	11	10	7	5	6	5	5	5	6	5	5	5	5	5	5	6	8	9	9	6	8	9
Náutico	19	20	12	7	9	11	15	14	17	9	15	17	17	17	16	15	17	18	18	19	19	20	18	19	20	20	20	20	20	20	20	20	20	20	20	20	20	20
Novorizontino	16	14	16	19	19	7	5	5	6	6	7	12	15	11	8	9	8	11	8	11	11	11	13	10	13	13	13	13	13	13	14	16	16	16	15	16	17	16
Operário Ferroviário	6	2	9	13	14	8	9	7	7	7	6	8	8	12	9	12	13	14	15	16	16	15	16	16	17	17	18	17	18	19	19	18	18	18	18	18	19	19
Ponte Preta	12	19	11	15	7	10	12	13	16	19	13	16	19	18	18	18	16	16	14	15	13	13	11	13	12	12	10	11	9	8	7	10	10	11	11	13	12	12
Sampaio Corrêa	17	16	5	10	11	17	11	12	8	8	12	9	10	13	10	11	10	6	9	7	8	8	7	7	9	10	12	12	12	12	10	9	6	7	6	8	7	5
Sport	3	4	4	3	6	3	2	3	4	3	4	4	5	5	5	6	5	5	6	10	7	7	8	6	8	6	6	6	7	6	8	7	5	5	5	7	6	7
Tombense	10	10	14	16	16	19	19	20	18	10	10	7	6	6	6	7	6	7	5	6	5	6	6	8	5	9	7	8	11	11	12	11	12	12	14	14	15	15
Vasco da Gama	7	9	15	8	8	5	4	4	2	4	3	3	2	2	2	2	2	2	2	3	2	4	4	4	4	4	3	4	4	4	4	4	4	4	4	3	4	4
Vila Nova	8	11	18	17	18	13	16	16	19	18	19	20	20	20	20	20	20	20	20	20	20	19	20	20	18	19	17	19	17	15	13	15	14	13	12	12	13	13

Champions, promoted to Campeonato Brasileiro Série A
Promotion to Campeonato Brasileiro Série A
Relegation to Campeonato Brasileiro Série C

Source: CBF

== Results ==
Home \ Away	BAH	BRU	CHA	CRB	CRI	CRU	CSA	GRE	GUA	ITU	LON	NAU	NOV	OPE	PON	SAM	SPO	TOM	VAS	VIL
Bahia	—	1–0	0–1	1–1	2–1	2–0	1–0	0–0	1–1	2–0	4–0	3–0	0–1	2–2	2–1	1–0	1–0	3–1	2–1	1–1
Brusque	0–2	—	0–0	0–0	0–2	0–0	2–0	1–1	1–0	0–1	0–1	1–2	2–2	2–0	2–1	1–1	0–1	1–0	1–0	0–1
Chapecoense	3–1	1–0	—	1–2	2–3	0–2	1–0	0–0	0–0	1–1	0–3	1–0	2–2	1–1	3–0	3–1	0–1	3–2	0–0	1–2
CRB	1–2	1–1	2–1	—	0–0	0–2	0–0	2–0	1–1	1–1	1–0	1–2	2–1	2–1	1–1	2–1	2–0	0–0	1–1	1–0
Criciúma	0–0	0–1	2–0	3–0	—	0–1	2–1	2–0	0–0	3–0	1–0	2–1	1–1	2–0	1–1	3–1	1–1	2–0	0–1	1–0
Cruzeiro	1–0	1–0	1–1	2–0	1–1	—	3–2	1–0	0–1	1–1	1–0	4–0	2–1	1–0	2–0	2–0	2–1	2–0	3–0	2–0
CSA	1–1	1–0	1–1	1–1	1–1	1–1	—	1–1	1–2	1–3	0–1	2–0	2–1	0–0	0–1	0–0	1–0	2–0	2–0	1–0
Grêmio	1–1	3–0	0–1	2–0	0–0	2–2	2–0	—	3–1	0–1	1–0	2–0	2–0	5–1	2–1	2–0	3–0	3–0	2–1	2–1
Guarani	0–2	1–1	1–0	1–0	1–0	1–0	0–0	1–2	—	0–2	1–0	1–0	2–0	0–3	0–0	3–0	0–0	2–1	0–0	1–1
Ituano	1–0	2–0	1–0	1–0	1–2	1–1	0–0	1–1	2–1	—	0–0	0–0	1–0	0–0	1–2	1–0	4–1	3–0	0–1	3–1
Londrina	1–1	2–1	2–1	1–0	1–1	1–2	0–0	1–1	3–1	0–2	—	2–0	1–1	2–1	0–2	1–0	2–1	1–1	0–1	2–2
Náutico	0–1	1–0	1–2	2–1	1–1	0–1	1–1	0–3	1–1	2–0	1–2	—	3–1	2–0	0–1	1–3	1–1	4–3	2–3	1–2
Novorizontino	1–1	1–0	0–3	3–1	3–1	1–4	1–1	2–0	1–2	2–1	0–1	6–0	—	2–1	1–1	0–0	0–0	1–3	2–0	1–1
Operário Ferroviário	0–1	0–0	2–1	2–3	2–0	1–2	0–0	0–1	0–1	3–2	1–0	1–0	0–3	—	2–0	1–1	0–0	0–0	2–3	1–1
Ponte Preta	2–0	2–0	0–0	1–0	1–1	1–4	0–2	0–0	1–0	1–1	1–2	1–0	0–1	3–0	—	0–0	1–0	0–0	3–1	1–1
Sampaio Corrêa	2–0	3–1	2–1	1–2	1–1	1–1	2–0	2–1	2–1	2–0	2–1	2–0	2–1	1–1	2–1	—	4–1	1–1	3–1	2–0
Sport	1–0	0–0	1–0	0–1	1–1	3–1	4–0	0–0	2–1	1–0	2–0	2–1	1–0	5–1	2–1	1–0	—	2–0	1–1	0–0
Tombense	1–0	1–0	2–1	1–2	1–0	1–1	2–1	2–2	1–1	2–1	1–1	1–1	2–0	1–1	0–0	3–0	1–0	—	1–1	0–0
Vasco da Gama	1–0	2–0	0–0	4–0	2–1	1–0	1–0	0–0	2–1	1–1	1–1	4–1	3–0	3–0	1–0	2–3	0–0	3–1	—	1–1
Vila Nova	1–1	0–2	0–0	1–0	1–0	1–0	1–2	0–0	2–1	1–1	0–0	2–0	0–0	0–0	1–1	0–0	0–0	1–1	1–0	—

Source: CBF
Legend: Blue = home team win; Yellow = draw; Red = away team win.

== Top goalscorers ==
Rank	Player	Club	Goals
1	(Brazil) Gabriel Poveda	Sampaio Corrêa	19
2	(Brazil) Lucca	Ponte Preta	15
3	(Brazil) Diego Souza	Grêmio	14
4	(Brazil) Edu	Cruzeiro	11
5	(Brazil) Ciel	Tombense	10
5	(Brazil) Hygor	Criciúma	10
5	(Brazil) Rafael Elias	Ituano	10
5	(Brazil) Raniel	Vasco da Gama	10
9	(Brazil) Anselmo Ramon	CRB	9
9	(Brazil) Matheus Davó	Bahia	9
9	(Brazil) Rodrigo Rodrigues	CSA	9
9	(Brazil) Ronaldo	Novorizontino	9
9	(Brazil) Ygor Catatau	Sampaio Corrêa	9

Source: CBF

== Awards ==
Month	Player of the month		Ref.
Month	Player	Club	Ref.
April	(Brazil) Diego Souza	Grêmio	
May	(Brazil) Lucas Oliveira	Cruzeiro	
June	(Brazil) Andrey Santos	Vasco da Gama	
