= 2018 Campeonato Brasileiro Série B =

Campeonato Brasileiro Série B
- Season: 2018
- Champions: Fortaleza (1st title)
- Promoted: Avaí; CSA; Fortaleza; Goiás
- Relegated: Boa Esporte; Juventude; Paysandu; Sampaio Corrêa
- Matches played: 380
- Goals scored: 846 (2.23 per match)
- Top goalscorer: 17 goals Dagoberto (Londrina)
- Biggest home win: Brasil de Pelotas 5–0 Vila Nova; R35, 6 November
- Biggest away win: CRB 0–4 Avaí; R6, 15 May; Paysandu 0–4 Ponte Preta; R20, 7 August; Juventude 0–4 CSA; R38, 24 November
- Highest attendance: 57,223; Fortaleza 1–0 Paysandu; R32, 20 October; Fortaleza 4–1 Juventude; R37, 15 November
- Lowest attendance: 42; Boa Esporte 0–1 Brasil de Pelotas; R36, 9 November
- Total attendance: 1,942,401
- Average attendance: 5,250

The 2018 Campeonato Brasileiro Série B was a football competition held in Brazil, equivalent to the second division.

Twenty teams competed in the tournament, twelve returning from the 2017 season, four promoted from the 2017 Campeonato Brasileiro Série C (CSA, Fortaleza, São Bento and Sampaio Corrêa). and four relegated from the 2017 Campeonato Brasileiro Série A (Coritiba, Avaí, Ponte Preta and Atlético Goianiense).

The top four teams were promoted to the 2019 Campeonato Brasileiro Série A. Fortaleza became the first club to be promoted after a 1–2 win against Atlético Goianiense on 3 November 2018. Goiás was promoted on 17 November, and Avaí and CSA on 24 November.

== Teams ==
Location of teams in 2018 Série B

Pos.	Relegated from 2017 Série A
17º	Coritiba
18º	Avaí
19º	Ponte Preta
20º	Atlético Goianiense

Pos.	Promoted from 2017 Série C
1º	CSA
2º	Fortaleza
3°	São Bento
4º	Sampaio Corrêa

=== Number of teams by state ===
Number of teams	State	Team(s)
4	São Paulo	Guarani, Oeste, Ponte Preta and São Bento
3	Goiás	Atlético Goianiense, Goiás and Vila Nova
3	Santa Catarina	Avaí, Criciúma and Figueirense
2	Alagoas	CRB and CSA
2	Paraná	Coritiba and Londrina
2	Rio Grande do Sul	Brasil de Pelotas and Juventude
1	Ceará	Fortaleza
1	Maranhão	Sampaio Corrêa
1	Minas Gerais	Boa Esporte
1	Pará	Paysandu

== Venues ==
Team	Home city	Stadium	Capacity
Atlético Goianiense	Goiânia	Olímpico Pedro Ludovico	13,500
Atlético Goianiense	Goiânia	Antônio Accioly	5,000
Avaí	Florianópolis	Ressacada	17,826
Boa Esporte	Varginha	Melão	15,471
Brasil de Pelotas	Pelotas	Bento Freitas	18,000
Coritiba	Curitiba	Couto Pereira	40,502
CRB	Maceió	Rei Pelé	17,126
Criciúma	Criciúma	Heriberto Hülse	19,900
CSA	Maceió	Rei Pelé	17,126
Figueirense	Florianópolis	Orlando Scarpelli	19,584
Fortaleza	Fortaleza	Castelão	63,903
Goiás	Goiânia	Serra Dourada	42,000
Goiás	Goiânia	Olímpico Pedro Ludovico	13,500
Guarani	Campinas	Brinco de Ouro	29,130
Juventude	Caxias do Sul	Alfredo Jaconi	19,924
Londrina	Londrina	Café	31,000
Oeste	Barueri	Arena Barueri	31,452
Paysandu	Belém	Curuzú	16,200
Paysandu	Belém	Olímpico do Pará	45,007
Ponte Preta	Campinas	Moisés Lucarelli	19,728
Ponte Preta	Campinas	Nabi Abi Chedid (Bragança Paulista)	17,128
Ponte Preta	Campinas	Fonte Luminosa (Araraquara)	21,441
Sampaio Corrêa	São Luís	Castelão	40,149
São Bento	Sorocaba	Walter Ribeiro	13,772
Vila Nova	Goiânia	Serra Dourada	42,000

== Personnel and kits ==
Team	Manager	Kit manufacturer	Shirt main sponsor
Atlético Goianiense	(Japan) Wagner Lopes	(Brazil) Numer	(Brazil) Caixa
Avaí	(Brazil) Geninho	(England) Umbro	(Brazil) Caixa
Boa Esporte	(Brazil) Tuca Guimarães	(Brazil) Embratex	None
Brasil de Pelotas	(Brazil) Rogério Zimmermann	(Brazil) Topper	(Brazil) Caixa
Coritiba	(Brazil) Argel Fucks	(Brazil) 1909	(Brazil) Caixa
CRB	(Brazil) Roberto Fernandes	(Brazil) Rinat	(Brazil) Caixa
Criciúma	(Brazil) Mazola Júnior	(Brazil) Embratex	(Brazil) Caixa
CSA	(Brazil) Marcelo Cabo	None	None
Figueirense	(Brazil) Rogério Micale	(Germany) Adidas	(Brazil) Caixa
Fortaleza	(Brazil) Rogério Ceni	None	None
Goiás	(Brazil) Ney Franco	(Brazil) Topper	(Brazil) Caixa
Guarani	(Brazil) Marco Antônio Ribeiro	(Brazil) Topper	None
Juventude	(Brazil) Luiz Carlos Winck	(Brazil) 19Treze	(Brazil) Banrisul
Londrina	(Brazil) Roberto Fonseca	(Brazil) Karilu Sports	(Brazil) Caixa
Oeste	(Brazil) Roberto Cavalo	(Brazil) Deka	(Brazil) Consigaz
Paysandu	(Brazil) João Brigatti	None	(Brazil) Caixa
Ponte Preta	(Brazil) Gilson Kleina	(Germany) Adidas	(Brazil) Caixa
Sampaio Corrêa	(Brazil) Marcinho Guerreiro	(Brazil) Numer	None
São Bento	(Brazil) Marquinhos Santos	(Spain) Joma	(Brazil) JCB
Vila Nova	(Brazil) Hemerson Maria	(Brazil) Rinat	(Brazil) Caixa

=== Managerial changes ===
Team	Outgoing manager	Manner of departure	Date	Position in table	Incoming manager
CRB	(Brazil) Mazola Júnior	Resigned	13 April	19th	(Brazil) Júnior Rocha
Coritiba	(Brazil) Sandro Forner	Sacked	15 April	20th	(Brazil) Eduardo Baptista
Avaí	(Brazil) Claudinei Oliveira	Sacked	19 April	17th	(Brazil) Geninho
Boa Esporte	(Brazil) Sidney Moraes	Sacked	4 May	20th	(Brazil) Daniel Paulista
Goiás	(Brazil) Hélio dos Anjos	Sacked	6 May	18th	(Brazil) Ney Franco
Sampaio Corrêa	(Brazil) Francisco Diá	Sacked	8 May	16th	(Brazil) Roberto Fonseca
Criciúma	(Brazil) Argel Fucks	Sacked	9 May	19th	(Brazil) Mazola Júnior
Ponte Preta	(Brazil) Doriva	Sacked	29 May	15th	(Brazil) João Brigatti
Brasil de Pelotas	(Brazil) Clemer	Sacked	17 June	18th	(Brazil) Gilmar Dal Pozzo
Boa Esporte	(Brazil) Daniel Paulista	Sacked	24 June	20th	(Brazil) Ney da Matta
São Bento	(Brazil) Paulo Roberto Santos	Sacked	25 June	8th	(Brazil) Marquinhos Santos
CRB	(Brazil) Júnior Rocha	Sacked	27 June	18th	(Brazil) Doriva
Londrina	(Brazil) Marquinhos Santos	Signed by São Bento	28 June	15th	(Brazil) Sérgio Soares
Paysandu	(Brazil) Dado Cavalcanti	Sacked	12 July	15th	(Brazil) Guilherme Alves
Sampaio Corrêa	(Brazil) Roberto Fonseca	Sacked	26 July	19th	(Brazil) Paulo Roberto Santos
Londrina	(Brazil) Sérgio Soares	Sacked	4 August	15th	(Brazil) Roberto Fonseca
Coritiba	(Brazil) Eduardo Baptista	Sacked	10 August	10th	(Brazil) Tcheco
Paysandu	(Brazil) Guilherme Alves	Sacked	25 August	16th	(Brazil) João Brigatti
Juventude	(Brazil) Julinho Camargo	Sacked	26 August	13th	(Brazil) Luiz Carlos Winck
Brasil de Pelotas	(Brazil) Gilmar Dal Pozzo	Sacked	29 August	18th	(Brazil) Rogério Zimmermann
Ponte Preta	(Brazil) João Brigatti	Replaced	2 September	9th	(Brazil) Marcelo Chamusca
Sampaio Corrêa	(Brazil) Paulo Roberto Santos	Resigned	5 September	19th	(Brazil) Marcinho Guerreiro
Figueirense	(Brazil) Milton Cruz	Sacked	10 September	8th	(Brazil) Rogério Micale
CRB	(Brazil) Doriva	Sacked	16 September	17th	(Brazil) Roberto Fernandes
Coritiba	(Brazil) Tcheco	Replaced	16 September	11th	(Brazil) Argel Fucks
Ponte Preta	(Brazil) Marcelo Chamusca	Sacked	26 September	11th	(Brazil) Gilson Kleina
Boa Esporte	(Brazil) Ney da Matta	Sacked	8 October	20th	(Brazil) Tuca Guimarães
Atlético Goianiense	(Brazil) Claudio Tencati	Sacked	13 October	7th	(Japan) Wagner Lopes
Guarani	(Brazil) Umberto Louzer	Sacked	13 November	9th	(Brazil) Marco Antônio Ribeiro

== League table ==
Pos	Team	Pld	W	D	L	GF	GA	GD	Pts	Promotion or relegation
1	Fortaleza (C, P)	38	21	8	9	54	33	+21	71	Promotion to 2019 Campeonato Brasileiro Série A
2	CSA (P)	38	17	11	10	51	37	+14	62	Promotion to 2019 Campeonato Brasileiro Série A
3	Avaí (P)	38	16	13	9	50	32	+18	61	Promotion to 2019 Campeonato Brasileiro Série A
4	Goiás (P)	38	18	6	14	54	50	+4	60	Promotion to 2019 Campeonato Brasileiro Série A
5	Ponte Preta	38	16	12	10	42	30	+12	60	
6	Atlético Goianiense	38	16	11	11	57	51	+6	59	
7	Vila Nova	38	14	15	9	41	36	+5	57	
8	Londrina	38	15	10	13	45	42	+3	55	
9	Guarani	38	14	12	12	44	39	+5	54	
10	Coritiba	38	13	13	12	40	44	−4	52	
11	Brasil de Pelotas	38	13	11	14	36	35	+1	50	
12	CRB	38	12	12	14	35	39	−4	48	
13	São Bento	38	11	14	13	41	41	0	47	
14	Criciúma	38	11	14	13	45	49	−4	47	
15	Figueirense	38	11	13	14	48	51	−3	46	
16	Oeste	38	9	19	10	36	40	−4	46	
17	Paysandu (R)	38	10	13	15	42	53	−11	43	Relegation to 2019 Campeonato Brasileiro Série C
18	Sampaio Corrêa (R)	38	10	8	20	32	47	−15	38	Relegation to 2019 Campeonato Brasileiro Série C
19	Juventude (R)	38	7	14	17	27	48	−21	35	Relegation to 2019 Campeonato Brasileiro Série C
20	Boa Esporte (R)	38	7	9	22	26	49	−23	30	Relegation to 2019 Campeonato Brasileiro Série C

Source: CBF
Rules for classification: 1) points; 2) wins; 3) goal difference; 4) goals scored; 5) head-to-head results; 6) least red cards received; 7) least yellow cards received; 8) draw.
(C) Champions; (P) Promoted; (R) Relegated

== Results ==
Home \ Away	ATG	AVA	BOA	BDP	CTB	CRB	CRI	CSA	FIG	FOR	GOI	GUA	JUV	LON	OES	PAY	PON	SCO	SBE	VIL
Atlético Goianiense	—	2–2	2–0	2–1	1–0	1–0	3–2	2–2	3–4	1–2	1–3	3–2	0–1	0–0	2–2	1–0	2–0	1–2	1–0	2–2
Avaí	0–0	—	2–0	2–2	2–0	1–0	0–1	0–0	0–1	0–1	0–1	3–3	1–0	1–1	1–1	3–1	0–0	3–1	1–1	1–0
Boa Esporte	0–2	0–2	—	0–1	1–1	0–1	1–2	2–0	0–2	0–2	1–0	2–1	1–2	1–0	0–0	1–1	2–1	3–1	2–2	0–2
Brasil de Pelotas	1–2	1–1	2–0	—	0–1	1–0	1–0	0–2	1–0	0–1	1–0	1–1	1–1	3–0	1–3	0–0	0–2	1–2	1–1	5–0
Coritiba	1–0	1–0	2–1	1–0	—	1–0	2–1	1–1	1–1	1–0	1–0	0–2	2–1	0–1	0–2	2–0	0–0	0–0	2–2	2–0
CRB	3–1	0–4	2–1	1–1	1–1	—	0–0	0–0	2–1	2–1	2–0	1–1	2–0	1–1	0–1	1–1	2–0	2–1	1–0	0–1
Criciúma	1–1	3–2	1–1	0–1	2–2	3–3	—	1–3	1–1	2–0	2–2	0–0	0–0	2–1	0–0	4–1	0–1	2–0	1–0	1–0
CSA	0–0	0–1	1–0	2–0	2–2	0–0	3–0	—	1–4	0–0	2–1	1–2	1–0	4–1	5–1	1–0	1–2	1–0	1–0	1–2
Figueirense	2–2	0–1	2–0	1–1	2–2	0–0	3–2	1–2	—	1–3	1–2	0–0	2–1	1–1	1–2	2–3	0–2	1–0	2–2	2–1
Fortaleza	0–1	1–1	2–1	2–0	2–1	3–1	2–0	1–1	2–2	—	3–0	2–1	4–1	2–1	1–2	1–0	1–1	1–0	2–1	2–0
Goiás	2–1	0–3	1–2	0–1	0–1	2–1	2–1	3–0	0–2	3–1	—	1–1	1–1	0–0	1–0	2–1	2–2	1–0	2–1	1–3
Guarani	2–0	1–2	1–1	2–1	2–1	2–0	1–0	1–0	2–3	2–3	0–2	—	1–0	1–0	1–1	0–2	2–3	2–0	0–0	1–1
Juventude	2–2	1–3	0–0	0–1	1–1	1–0	0–1	0–4	0–0	0–3	3–5	1–0	—	0–0	1–1	1–1	0–1	1–0	0–2	0–1
Londrina	4–1	1–2	1–0	1–0	3–2	1–2	4–2	1–2	2–0	1–1	1–3	1–2	0–1	—	3–0	2–1	1–0	1–1	2–1	3–2
Oeste	1–2	1–0	1–1	0–0	1–1	2–0	2–2	2–1	0–0	0–0	1–3	0–1	0–0	0–0	—	2–2	0–0	0–0	0–1	2–0
Paysandu	2–5	2–1	2–0	2–1	1–1	1–1	1–1	0–0	2–0	0–1	2–3	1–0	3–3	1–0	4–3	—	0–4	0–1	1–1	1–2
Ponte Preta	1–3	2–2	1–0	0–1	2–0	1–0	3–1	1–1	2–1	2–0	2–1	0–0	0–1	0–1	1–1	0–1	—	0–0	2–1	1–1
Sampaio Corrêa	2–3	1–1	1–0	1–2	2–0	2–3	0–1	2–3	1–0	1–0	1–3	0–2	0–0	1–2	2–0	1–1	1–0	—	2–1	0–0
São Bento	2–1	0–1	0–0	1–1	5–2	1–0	0–0	2–1	1–1	2–1	1–1	1–0	2–2	0–1	1–0	1–0	0–2	2–1	—	2–2
Vila Nova	0–0	1–0	2–0	0–0	2–1	0–0	2–2	0–1	3–1	0–0	3–0	1–1	1–0	1–1	1–1	0–0	0–0	3–1	1–0	—

Source: CBF
Legend: Blue = home team win; Yellow = draw; Red = away team win.

== Top scorers ==
Rank	Player	Club	Goals
1	(Brazil) Dagoberto	Londrina	17
2	(Brazil) Lucão	Goiás	16
3	(Brazil) Gustavo Henrique	Fortaleza	14
4	(Brazil) Renato	Avaí	12
5	(Brazil) Alan Mineiro	Vila Nova	11
5	(Brazil) André Luis	Ponte Preta	11
5	(Brazil) Willians Santana	CRB	11
8	(Brazil) Élton	Figueirense	10
8	(Brazil) Rafael Longuine	Guarani	10
10	(Brazil) Guilherme Parede	Coritiba	9
10	(Brazil) Júnior Brandão	Atlético Goianiense	9

Source: CBF
