= 2016 Campeonato Brasileiro Série B =

Campeonato Brasileiro Série B
- Season: 2016
- Champions: Atlético Goianiense
- Promoted: Atlético Goianiense; Vasco; Avaí; Bahia
- Relegated: Sampaio Corrêa; Tupi; Bragantino; Joinville
- Matches: 380
- Goals: 892 (2.35 per match)
- Top goalscorer: Bill, Ceará (15 goals)
- Biggest home win: 5–0 Náutico v Sampaio Corrêa R4, 27 May 2016
- Biggest away win: 0–4 Sampaio Corrêa v Vasco da Gama R1, 14 May 2016
- Longest winning run: 6 Avaí
- Longest unbeaten run: 13 Paysandu
- Longest winless run: 16 Oeste
- Longest losing run: 7 Sampaio Corrêa
- Highest attendance: 55,455 Ceará 0–0 Vasco da Gama R19, 2 August 2016
- Lowest attendance: 88 Oeste 0–1 Atlético Goianiense R1, 13 May 2016
- Total attendance: 1,987,912
- Average attendance: 5,231
- All statistics correct as of 09:56, 28 November 2016 (UTC).

The Serie B of the Brazilian Championship 2016 was a football competition held in Brazil, equivalent to the second division. It was contested by 20 clubs. The top four teams will were promoted to Série A in 2017 and the bottom four were relegated to Série C in 2017.The games had a break during the 2016 Olympics, which was held between July and August in Brazil. The competition had nineteen rounds played before the stoppage.

Atlético Goianiense were the champions.

== Teams ==
20 teams participated in the 2016 edition: the 12 teams from 5th to 16th of the previous (2015) edition of Série B, 4 relegated from 2015 Série A and 4 promoted from 2015 Série C. Teams in red left the competition this season (either due to a promotion or a relegation). Teams in green joined the competition this season (either due to a promotion or a relegation).

Pos.	Relegated from 2015 Serie B
17º	Macaé
18º	ABC
19º	Boa Esporte
20º	Mogi Mirim

Pos.	Promoted from 2015 Serie C
1º	Vila Nova
2º	Londrina
3°	Brasil de Pelotas
4º	Tupi

Pos.	Promoted to 2016 Serie A
1º	Botafogo
2º	Santa Cruz
3º	Vitória
4º	América Mineiro

Pos.	Relegated from 2015 Serie A
17º	Avaí
18º	Vasco
19°	Goiás
20º	Joinville

=== Stadia and locations ===
Location of teams in 2016 Série B

Team	Home city	State	Stadium	Capacity	2015 season
Atlético Goianiense	Goiânia	Goiás	Serra Dourada	41,574	14th in Série B
Avaí	Florianópolis	Santa Catarina	Ressacada	17,537	17th in Série A
Bahia	Salvador	Bahia	Fonte Nova	51,708	9th in Série B
Bragantino	Bragança Paulista	São Paulo	Nabi Abi Chedid	17,022	6th in Série B
Brasil de Pelotas	Pelotas	Rio Grande do Sul	Bento Freitas	18,000	4th in Série C
Ceará	Fortaleza	Ceará	Castelão	67,037	15th in Série B
CRB	Maceió	Alagoas	Rei Pelé	20,551	11th in Série B
Criciúma	Criciúma	Santa Catarina	Heriberto Hülse	19,300	12th in Série B
Goiás	Goiânia	Goiás	Serra Dourada	41,574	19th in Série A
Joinville	Joinville	Santa Catarina	Arena Joinville	22,400	20th in Série A
Londrina	Londrina	Paraná	Café	36,056	2nd in Série C
Luverdense	Lucas do Rio Verde	Mato Grosso	Passo das Emas	10,000	10th in Série B
Náutico	Recife	Pernambuco	Arena Pernambuco	46,154	5th in Série B
Oeste	Itápolis	São Paulo	Amaros	13,044	16th in Série B
Paraná	Curitiba	Paraná	Vila Capanema	20,083	13th in Série B
Paysandu	Belém	Pará	Curuzú	16,200	7th in Série B
Sampaio Corrêa	São Luís	Maranhão	Castelão	40,000	8th in Série B
Tupi	Juiz de Fora	Minas Gerais	Mário Helênio	31,863	3rd in Série C
Vasco da Gama	Rio de Janeiro	Rio de Janeiro	São Januário	22,150	18th in Série A
Vila Nova	Goiânia	Goiás	Serra Dourada	41,574	1st in Série C

=== Number of teams by state ===
Number of teams	State	Team(s)
3	Goiás	Atlético Goianiense, Goiás and Vila Nova
3	Santa Catarina	Avaí, Criciúma and Joinville
2	Paraná	Londrina and Paraná
2	São Paulo	Bragantino and Oeste
1	Alagoas	CRB
1	Bahia	Bahia
1	Ceará	Ceará
1	Maranhão	Sampaio Corrêa
1	Mato Grosso	Luverdense
1	Minas Gerais	Tupi
1	Pará	Paysandu
1	Pernambuco	Náutico
1	Rio de Janeiro	Vasco da Gama
1	Rio Grande do Sul	Brasil de Pelotas

=== Personnel and kits ===
Team	Manager	Kit manufacturer	Shirt sponsor
Atlético Goianiense	(Brazil) Marcelo Cabo	Numer	Caixa
Avaí	(Brazil) Claudinei Oliveira	Fila	
Bahia	(Brazil) Guto Ferreira	Penalty	MRV Engenharia
Bragantino	(Brazil) Estevam Soares	Kanxa	Academia K@2
Brasil de Pelotas	(Brazil) Rogério Zimmermann	Kappa	Banrisul
Ceará	(Brazil) Sérgio Soares	Penalty	
CRB	(Brazil) Mazola Júnior	Rinat	Caixa
Criciúma	(Brazil) Roberto Cavalo	Kappa	Resicolor Tintas; Construtora Locks
Goiás	(Brazil) Gilson Kleina	Dryworld	
Londrina	(Brazil) Claudio Tencati	Karilu	Sercomtel
Luverdense	(Brazil) Júnior Rocha	Kanxa	
Joinville	(Brazil) Ramon Menezes	Umbro	
Náutico	(Brazil) Givanildo Oliveira	Topper	
Oeste	(Brazil) Fernando Diniz	Kanxa	
Paysandu	(Brazil) Dado Cavalcanti	Puma	Banpará
Paraná	(Brazil) Roberto Fernandes	Erreà	Racco
Sampaio Corrêa	(Brazil) Flávio Araújo	Numer	
Tupi	(Brazil) Júlio Cirico	GSport	Implante Rio
Vasco da Gama	(Brazil) Jorginho	Umbro	Caixa
Vila Nova	(Brazil) Guilherme Alves	Rinat	Sicoob

=== Managerial changes ===
Team	Outgoing manager	Manner of departure	Position in table	Incoming manager
Oeste	(Brazil) Roberto Fonseca	Resigned	14th	(Brazil) Fernando Diniz
Sampaio Corrêa	(Serbia) Dejan Petković	Sacked	20th	(Japan) Wagner Lopes
Bragantino	(Brazil) Léo Condé	Resigned	19th	(Brazil) Toninho Cecílio
Vila Nova	(Brazil) Rogério Mancini	Resigned	17th	(Brazil) Guilherme Alves
Paysandu	(Brazil) Dado Cavalcanti	Resigned	18th	(Brazil) Gilmar Dal Pozzo
Tupi	(Brazil) Ricardo Drubscky	Sacked	19th	(Brazil) Estevam Soares
Goiás	(Brazil) Enderson Moreira	Sacked	17th	(Brazil) Léo Condé
Paraná	(Brazil) Claudinei Oliveira	Sacked	13th	(Brazil) Marcelo Martelotte
Bahia	(Brazil) Doriva	Sacked	5th	(Brazil) Guto Ferreira
Bragantino	(Brazil) Toninho Cecílio	Sacked	18th	(Brazil) Marcelo Veiga
Joinville	(Brazil) Hemerson Maria	Sacked	18th	(Brazil) Lisca
Paysandu	(Brazil) Gilmar Dal Pozzo	Sacked	15th	(Brazil) Dado Cavalcanti
Sampaio Corrêa	(Japan) Wagner Lopes	Sacked	20th	(Brazil) Flávio Araújo
Avaí	(Brazil) Silas Pereira	Sacked	15th	(Brazil) Claudinei Oliveira
Goiás	(Brazil) Léo Condé	Sacked	16th	(Brazil) Gilson Kleina
Náutico	(Brazil) Alexandre Gallo	Sacked	8th	(Brazil) Givanildo Oliveira
Joinville	(Brazil) Lisca	Sacked	19th	(Brazil) Ramon Menezes
Paraná	(Brazil) Marcelo Martelotte	Sacked	14th	(Brazil) Roberto Fernandes
Tupi	(Brazil) Estevam Soares	Sacked	8th	(Brazil) Ricardinho
Bragantino	(Brazil) Marcelo Veiga	Sacked	17th	(Brazil) Estevam Soares
Tupi	(Brazil) Ricardinho	Sacked	19th	(Brazil) Júlio Cirico

== League table ==
Pos	Team	Pld	W	D	L	GF	GA	GD	Pts	Qualification or relegation
1	Atlético Goianiense (P, C)	38	22	10	6	60	35	+25	76	Promotion to 2017 Campeonato Brasileiro Série A
2	Avaí (P)	38	19	9	10	45	34	+11	66	Promotion to 2017 Campeonato Brasileiro Série A
3	Vasco da Gama (P)	38	19	8	11	54	41	+13	65	Promotion to 2017 Campeonato Brasileiro Série A
4	Bahia (P)	38	18	9	11	57	34	+23	63	Promotion to 2017 Campeonato Brasileiro Série A
5	Náutico	38	18	6	14	55	43	+12	60	
6	Londrina	38	16	12	10	40	29	+11	60	
7	CRB	38	17	7	14	57	54	+3	58	
8	Criciúma	38	16	8	14	49	46	+3	56	
9	Luverdense	38	13	16	9	43	39	+4	55	
10	Ceará	38	14	12	12	49	47	+2	54	
11	Brasil de Pelotas	38	14	12	12	40	38	+2	54	
12	Vila Nova	38	15	8	15	54	52	+2	53	
13	Goiás	38	13	11	14	49	48	+1	50	
14	Paysandu	38	11	16	11	40	44	−4	49	
15	Paraná	38	10	11	17	39	55	−16	41	
16	Oeste	38	8	17	13	32	46	−14	41	
17	Joinville (R)	38	9	13	16	32	42	−10	40	Relegation to 2017 Campeonato Brasileiro Série C
18	Tupi (R)	38	8	9	21	40	56	−16	33	Relegation to 2017 Campeonato Brasileiro Série C
19	Bragantino (R)	38	8	8	22	30	54	−24	32	Relegation to 2017 Campeonato Brasileiro Série C
20	Sampaio Corrêa (R)	38	5	12	21	29	57	−28	27	Relegation to 2017 Campeonato Brasileiro Série C

Source: Soccerway.com
Rules for classification: 1) points; 2) wins; 3) goal difference; 4) goals scored; 5) head-to-head results; 6) least red cards received; 7) least yellow cards received; 8) draw.
(C) Champions; (P) Promoted; (R) Relegated

== Results ==
Home \ Away	ATG	AVA	BAH	BRG	BDP	CEA	CRB	CRI	GOI	JOI	LON	LUV	NAU	OES	PAR	PAY	SAM	TPI	VAS	VIL
Atlético Goianiense		3–0	2–1	1–0	1–0	2–2	1–2	1–0	4–2	1–1	1–2	2–0	3–0	1–1	2–0	2–1	4–1	5–3	2–1	2–1
Avaí	1–1		0–3	2–0	1–1	4–2	2–1	3–0	2–0	0–1	1–0	2–1	3–0	1–1	1–0	2–0	2–0	1–0	2–1	3–1
Bahia	1–1	2–1		3–2	1–0	3–1	3–0	2–0	4–2	1–0	1–2	1–0	0–0	2–0	3–0	3–0	1–0	4–0	1–0	0–1
Bragantino	1–2	1–0	1–0		0–2	1–1	1–2	2–0	0–1	2–0	0–1	0–1	0–1	0–0	0–1	0–0	2–1	2–1	1–2	2–2
Brasil de Pelotas	0–1	3–0	2–1	2–0		2–1	1–0	1–2	2–1	2–0	0–1	1–1	0–0	1–1	2–0	1–0	1–1	1–0	2–1	2–2
Ceará	0–1	0–0	1–0	2–0	3–0		1–1	1–0	2–1	2–1	1–0	0–0	2–1	1–0	1–1	2–2	0–1	2–1	0–0	2–3
CRB	1–2	1–2	2–2	2–1	1–2	0–3		2–1	2–1	2–1	0–1	3–0	1–0	3–1	1–1	0–1	2–1	3–0	1–2	1–2
Criciúma	1–2	1–0	3–2	1–1	3–0	2–3	1–1		3–1	0–1	1–1	2–2	1–0	4–0	3–2	0–3	1–0	2–2	1–0	1–0
Goiás	2–2	2–0	0–2	2–1	1–1	2–0	3–0	1–1		3–2	1–1	1–1	4–2	1–1	4–0	0–0	2–1	2–1	1–1	1–2
Joinville	0–0	0–1	1–1	1–1	1–1	1–1	1–3	0–0	2–1		1–1	1–1	0–0	0–1	1–0	0–0	2–0	1–1	0–2	4–2
Londrina	2–3	0–1	1–0	2–0	1–0	1–1	0–1	2–2	0–1	1–0		1–1	1–0	3–0	1–1	0–0	1–1	1–0	0–1	1–0
Luverdense	3–2	1–1	2–2	4–0	1–0	2–0	0–0	2–1	1–0	1–1	2–1		2–1	0–1	3–2	3–1	0–0	2–1	1–1	0–2
Náutico	2–1	3–1	0–0	1–1	2–0	1–0	1–3	0–1	1–0	2–0	0–2	1–0		0–2	5–1	2–1	5–0	1–0	3–1	3–2
Oeste	0–1	0–0	1–1	1–3	1–1	1–1	2–1	1–0	1–2	0–2	1–1	1–1	0–0		3–3	1–0	1–0	0–0	1–1	1–3
Paraná	0–0	0–0	0–0	4–1	0–2	1–1	5–3	1–2	2–0	1–0	2–1	1–2	1–2	2–1		0–0	1–0	0–2	0–1	1–2
Paysandu	0–0	1–0	2–1	3–0	1–1	2–0	2–2	1–2	1–1	1–0	0–0	2–1	1–3	1–1	1–1		2–1	0–3	3–1	2–2
Sampaio Corrêa	0–1	1–2	0–0	0–0	1–1	2–3	1–1	1–0	0–0	1–2	1–3	2–0	4–3	1–1	1–2	0–0		3–1	0–4	0–3
Tupi	1–0	1–1	2–1	0–1	1–1	2–1	3–4	0–2	0–1	1–2	1–1	0–0	1–4	0–1	2–0	5–1	1–1		2–2	1–0
Vasco da Gama	2–0	0–0	4–3	2–1	2–0	2–1	1–2	2–1	1–0	2–0	1–0	1–1	3–2	3–2	1–2	0–2	1–1	1–0		1–2
Vila Nova	0–0	1–2	0–1	3–1	3–1	3–4	1–2	2–3	1–1	2–1	1–2	0–0	0–2	1–0	0–0	2–2	1–0	1–0	0–2	

Updated to match(es) played on 25 November 2016. Source: CBF
Legend: Blue = home team win; Yellow = draw; Red = away team win.

== Top scorers ==
As of end of season

Rank	Player	Club	Goals
1	Bill	Ceará	15
2	Felipe Garcia	Brasil de Pelotas	13
2	Nenê	Vasco da Gama	13
4	Rômulo	Avaí	12
5	Gustavo	Criciúma	11
5	Léo Gamalho	Goiás	11
5	Roni	Náutico	11
5	Hernane	Bahia	11
9	Júnior Viçosa	Atlético Goianiense	10
10	Hugo	Luverdense	9
10	Zé Carlos	CRB	9
10	Rossi	Goiás	9
10	Moisés	Vila Nova	9
10	Germano	Londrina	9
10	Ramon	Brasil de Pelotas	9

== Attendances ==
=== Average home attendances ===
Pos.	Team	GP	Total	High	Low	Average
1	Bahia	19	326,913	44,042	7,298	17,206
2	Ceará	19	210,520	55,455	1,075	11,080
3	Paysandu	19	167,467	28,938	3,896	8,814
4	Náutico	19	135,502	22,973	939	7,132
5	Vasco	19	131,587	50,551	1,689	6,926
6	CRB	19	117,256	11,225	1,374	6,171
7	Avaí	19	113,365	15,139	1,717	5,967
8	Atlético Goianiense	19	98,287	16,356	631	5,173
9	Londrina	19	96,819	13,318	1,524	5,096
10	Vila Nova	19	85,956	11,074	1,060	4,524
11	Sampaio Corrêa	19	85,335	28,927	421	4,491
12	Criciúma	19	80,289	8,263	2,342	4,226
13	Joinville	19	75,861	8,794	1,129	4,215
14	Goiás	19	73,752	13,344	1,001	3,882
15	Brasil de Pelotas	19	53,354	5,211	298	2,808
16	Paraná	19	41,661	6,046	598	2,193
17	Oeste	19	29,911	3,883	88	1,574
18	Tupi	19	23,091	11,317	102	1,215
19	Luverdense	19	21,960	4,048	573	1,156
20	Bragantino	19	19,026	3,219	270	1,001
-	Total	380	1,987,912	55,455	88	5,231

Final table after all games played.

Source: http://cbf.com.br/competicoes/brasileiro-serie-b
