= 2015 Campeonato Brasileiro Série B =

Campeonato Brasileiro Série B
- Season: 2015
- Champions: Botafogo
- Promoted: Botafogo; Vitória; Santa Cruz; América-MG
- Relegated: Macaé; ABC; Boa Esporte; Mogi Mirim
- Matches: 380
- Goals: 925 (2.43 per match)
- Top goalscorer: Zé Carlos (CRB) (19 goals)
- Highest attendance: Santa Cruz 1–0 Botafogo (August 8, 2015, Arruda) - 43,320 people
- Lowest attendance: Boa Esporte 0–1 Mogi Mirim (September 8, 2015, Melão) - 95 people
- Average attendance: 6,126

The Serie B of the Brazilian Championship 2015 is a football competition held in Brazil, equivalent to the second division. It is contested by 20 clubs, between May 9 and November 28. The top four teams will have access to Série A in 2016 and the last four will be relegated to Série C in 2016. recently promoted Mogi Mirim was the first team to have its relegation confirmed, after losing to Ceará in October 31. After a defeat to Luverdense in November 6, Boa Esporte also was relegated. ABC also was relegated, after a tie against Bahia in November 10. Botafogo was promoted that same day, after a victory against Luverdense. In November 14, Vitória, Santa Cruz and América-MG confirmed their promotions. Ceará, that had spent most of the championship in the relegation zone, managed to escape relegation after a victory against Macaé in the last round, with this result, combined with Oeste's draw against Paysandu, relegating the Fluminense team.

== Teams ==
Location of teams in 2015 Série B

Team	Home city	Stadium	Capacity	2014 season
ABC	Natal	Frasqueirão	15,082	14th in Série B
América Mineiro	Belo Horizonte	Independência	23,000	5th in Série B
Atlético Goianiense	Goiânia	Serra Dourada	41,574	7th in Série B
Bahia	Salvador	Fonte Nova	51,708	18th in Série A
Botafogo	Rio de Janeiro	Engenhão	46,931	19th in Série A
Boa Esporte	Varginha	Melão	15,471	6th in Série B
Bragantino	Bragança Paulista	Nabi Abi Chedid	17,022	16th in Série B
Ceará	Fortaleza	Castelão	67,037	8th in Série B
CRB	Maceió	Rei Pelé	20,551	4th in Série C
Criciúma	Criciúma	Heriberto Hülse	19,300	20th in Série A
Luverdense	Lucas do Rio Verde	Passo das Emas	10,000	12th in Série B
Macaé	Macaé	Moacyrzão	15,000	1st in Série C
Mogi Mirim	Mogi Mirim	Romildão	19,900	3rd in Série C
Náutico	Recife	Arena Pernambuco	46,154	13th in Série B
Oeste	Itápolis	Amaros	13,044	15th in Série B
Paysandu	Belém	Curuzú	16,200	2nd in Série C
Paraná	Curitiba	Vila Capanema	20,083	11th in Série B
Sampaio Corrêa	São Luís	Castelão	40,000	10th in Série B
Santa Cruz	Recife	Arruda	60,044	9th in Série B
Vitória	Salvador	Barradão	35,632	17th in Série A

=== Number of teams by state ===
Number of teams	State	Team(s)
3	São Paulo	Bragantino, Mogi Mirim and Oeste
2	Bahia	Bahia and Vitória
2	Minas Gerais	América Mineiro and Boa Esporte
2	Pernambuco	Náutico and Santa Cruz
2	Rio de Janeiro	Botafogo and Macaé
1	Alagoas	CRB
1	Ceará	Ceará
1	Goiás	Atlético Goianiense
1	Maranhão	Sampaio Corrêa
1	Mato Grosso	Luverdense
1	Pará	Paysandu
1	Paraná	Paraná
1	Rio Grande do Norte	ABC
1	Santa Catarina	Criciúma

== Personnel and kits ==
Team	Manager	Captain	Kit manufacturer	Shirt sponsor
ABC	(Brazil) Sérgio China	(Brazil) Leandro Amaro	Wilson	Caixa; EMS Pharma
América Mineiro	(Brazil) Givanildo Oliveira	(Brazil) Mancini	Lupo	Supermercados BH
Atlético Goianiense	(Brazil) Gilberto Pereira	(Brazil) Márcio	Erreà	Caixa
Bahia	(Brazil) Charles Fabian	(Brazil) Titi	Penalty	
Boa Esporte	(Brazil) Moacir Júnior		Kanxa	
Botafogo	(Brazil) Ricardo Gomes	(Brazil) Jefferson	Puma	
Bragantino	(Japan) Wagner Lopes	(Brazil) Lauro	Kanxa	
Ceará	(Brazil) Lisca	(Brazil) João Marcos	Penalty	
CRB	(Brazil) Mazola Júnior	(Brazil) Júlio César	Kanxa	Caixa
Criciúma	(Brazil) Roberto Cavalo		Kappa	
Luverdense	(Brazil) Júnior Rocha		Kanxa	
Macaé	(Brazil) Toninho Andrade			
Mogi Mirim	(Brazil) Toninho Cecílio		Kanxa	
Náutico	(Brazil) Gilmar Dal Pozzo	(Brazil) Júlio César	Umbro	
Oeste	(Brazil) Renan Freitas		Kanxa	
Paysandu	(Brazil) Dado Cavalcanti	(Brazil) Augusto Recife	Puma	Esamaz; Banpará; Drogarias Big Ben
Paraná	(Brazil) Fernando Miguel	(Brazil) Lúcio Flávio	Erreà	
Sampaio Corrêa	(Brazil) Leonardo Condé		Super Bolla	
Santa Cruz	(Brazil) Marcelo Martelotte	(Brazil) Edson Sitta	Penalty	
Vitória	(Brazil) Vágner Mancini	(Brazil) Jorge Wagner	Puma	Caixa

== League table ==
Pos	Team	Pld	W	D	L	GF	GA	GD	Pts	Qualification or relegation
1	Botafogo (P, C)	38	21	9	8	60	30	+30	72	Promoted to 2016 Série A
2	Santa Cruz (P)	38	20	7	11	63	43	+20	67	Promoted to 2016 Série A
3	Vitória (P)	38	19	9	10	58	40	+18	66	Promoted to 2016 Série A
4	América-MG (P)	38	19	8	11	55	39	+16	65	Promoted to 2016 Série A
5	Náutico	38	18	9	11	49	42	+7	63	
6	Bragantino	38	19	3	16	56	56	0	60	
7	Paysandu	38	17	9	12	49	40	+9	60	
8	Sampaio Corrêa	38	15	13	10	51	43	+8	58	
9	Bahia	38	15	13	10	48	41	+7	58	
10	Luverdense	38	15	9	14	46	40	+6	54	
11	CRB	38	15	9	14	47	45	+2	54	
12	Criciúma	38	12	13	13	36	41	−5	49	
13	Paraná	38	12	11	15	39	43	−4	47	
14	Atlético Goianiense	38	11	13	14	36	46	−10	46	
15	Ceará	38	12	9	17	42	50	−8	45	
16	Oeste	38	10	14	14	37	45	−8	44	
17	Macaé (R)	38	10	13	15	46	54	−8	43	Relegated to 2016 Série C
18	ABC (R)	38	6	14	18	41	64	−23	32	Relegated to 2016 Série C
19	Boa Esporte (R)	38	7	10	21	34	54	−20	31	Relegated to 2016 Série C
20	Mogi Mirim (R)	38	4	11	23	32	69	−37	23	Relegated to 2016 Série C

Updated to match(es) played on unknown. Source: Soccerway.com
Rules for classification: 1) points; 2) goal difference; 3) number of goals scored.
(C) Champions; (P) Promoted; (R) Relegated
