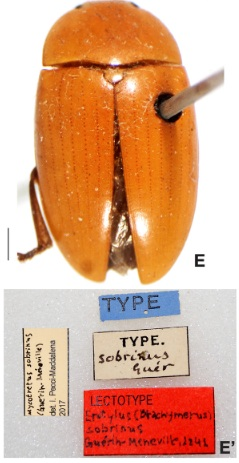

Scientific classification
- Kingdom: Animalia
- Phylum: Arthropoda
- Clade: Pancrustacea
- Class: Insecta
- Order: Coleoptera
- Suborder: Polyphaga
- Infraorder: Cucujiformia
- Family: Erotylidae
- Genus: Mycotretus
- Species: M. sobrinus

Binomial name
- Mycotretus sobrinus (Guérin-Méneville, 1841)

Synonyms
- see text

= Mycotretus sobrinus =

Species of beetle

Mycotretus sobrinus is a Brazilian beetle species in the pleasing fungus beetle family (Erotylidae). Among its family, this species is placed in subfamily Tritominae, or – in taxonomic arrangements that prefer a more comprehensive subfamily Erotylinae – in tribe Tritomini of the Erotylinae.

This species, 7.5–10 mm long and 4–6 mm wide as adult, was placed in genus Erotylus by Félix Guérin-Méneville when he first described it. Its type locality was not specified more precisely then "Brésil". The lectotype, designated in 2023, was acquired and evaluated by George Crotch, and is now in the UMZC collection. The paralectotype, also at UMCZ, is the supposed type specimen of a "Mycotretus simplex", also assigned to Guérin-Méneville by Crotch, but no such species seems ever to have been validly described. Its location is also not more precisely known than the early-mid 18th century Empire of Brazil. The same holds true for the lectotype – also at the UMCZ and designated in 2023 – of M.silaceus, described by Jean Lacordaire in 1842. This was recognized as indistinguishable from M.sobrinus and merged into it by Henry Gorham in 1888; before that, George Crotch seems to have acquired it from the collection of Louis Chevrolat.

The Naturalis collection had 5 specimens from Brazil at the 1941-42 revision, one of which was acquired in 1890 from Hardy-Dréneuf who got it from Porto Real near Rio de Janeiro; the other four have no detailed location data. Yet another UMCZ specimen was collected or acquired in "S Paul" (São Paulo city or province), These records suggest this beetle occurs in the general Atlantic Forest region, as do some more recent specimens with better data: One male, MNRJ specimen 1678, was collected in October 1966 on the famous Corcovado mountain of Rio de Janeiro. Its genitals were extracted for study, but the specimen may have been lost in 2018. A female collected on December 13, 2014, in Piau municipality of Minas Gerais state is now in the LSBC collection in Viçosa, Minas Gerais.

Invalid junior synonyms of this beetle are:

- Brachymerus sobrinus (Guérin-Méneville, 1841)
- Erotylus sobrinus Guérin-Méneville, 1841
- Mycotretus silaceus Lacordaire, 1842
- "Mycotretus silaceus" (nomen nudum)
