= Carlos Pimentel =

Brazilian football manager

Personal information
- Full name: Carlos Alberto Pimentel
- Date of birth: 17 July 1973 (age 53)
- Place of birth: Santo André, Brazil

Managerial career
- Years: Team
- 2009: Sport Recife (assistant)
- 2021–2022: Ituano (assistant)
- 2022: Ituano (interim)
- 2022–2023: Ituano
- 2024: Ipatinga

Carlos Alberto Pimentel (born 17 July 1973) is a Brazilian football coach.

== Career ==
Born in Santo André, São Paulo, Pimentel worked as a fitness coach at Corinthians and Santos before being named Nelsinho Baptista's assistant at Sport Recife in January 2009. He left the club in May when Nelsinho resigned, and subsequently joined Ituano as a fitness coach.

In 2010, Pimentel rejoined Nelsinho's staff at Japanese club Kashiwa Reysol, as a fitness coach. He continued to work with Nelsinho in the following years, having the same role at Vissel Kobe and then again at Kashiwa.

Pimentel returned to Brazil and Ituano on 6 December 2018, again as a fitness coach. Ahead of the 2021 season, he was named assistant coach of the club after the arrival of Mazola Júnior, and also acted as an interim on three occasions as Mazola was suspended.

On 15 July 2022, Pimentel was named interim head coach of Ituano, after Mazola was sacked. On 23 August 2022, after 40 days as an interim, he was permanently appointed head coach of the club.

After narrowly missing out promotion in the 2022 Série B, Pimentel was sacked on 6 February 2023, after starting the new campaign without a win. On 3 October, he was announced as head coach of Ipatinga for the upcoming season.
