= Fernando Miguel =

Fernando Miguel may refer to:

- Fernando Miguel (footballer, born 1979), retired Brazilian footballer
- Fernando Miguel (footballer, born 1985), Brazilian goalkeeper
