= Gilson Kleina =

Brazilian football manager

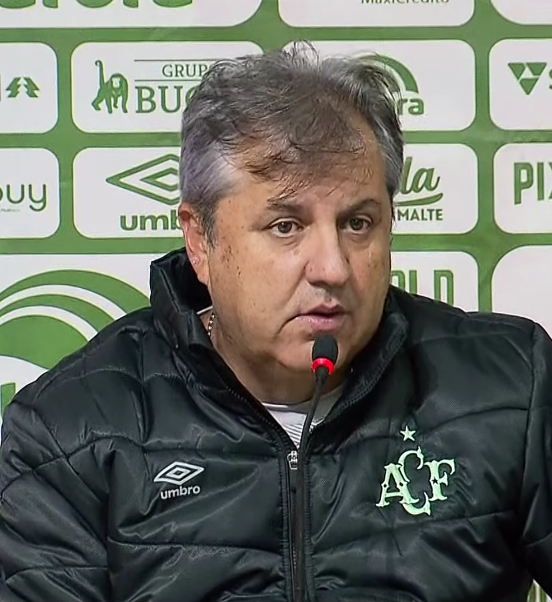

Personal information
- Date of birth: 30 March 1968 (age 58)
- Place of birth: Curitiba, Brazil

Team information
- Current team: Ponte Preta (head coach)

Managerial career
- Years: Team
- 1998–1999: Coritiba (assistant)
- 2000: Marseille (assistant)
- 2001: Atlético Mineiro (assistant)
- 2002: Villa Nova
- 2002: Botafogo (assistant)
- 2003: Iraty
- 2003–2004: Criciúma
- 2004: Paraná
- 2005: Iraty
- 2005: Caldense
- 2005: Cianorte
- 2005: Paysandu
- 2006: Coruripe
- 2006: Paraná
- 2006–2007: Gama
- 2007: Ipatinga
- 2007: Paraná
- 2007–2008: Caxias
- 2009: Vila Nova
- 2009: Duque de Caxias
- 2010: Boavista
- 2010: Ipatinga
- 2010: Duque de Caxias
- 2011–2012: Ponte Preta
- 2012–2014: Palmeiras
- 2014: Bahia
- 2015: Avaí
- 2016: Coritiba
- 2016–2017: Goiás
- 2017: Ponte Preta
- 2017–2018: Chapecoense
- 2018: Ponte Preta
- 2019: Criciúma
- 2019–2020: Ponte Preta
- 2020: Náutico
- 2021–2022: Ponte Preta
- 2022: Chapecoense
- 2022: Brusque
- 2023: Portuguesa
- 2024: Azuriz
- 2024: FC Cascavel
- 2025: Santo André
- 2025: Itabaiana
- 2026: Boavista
- 2026: Itabaiana
- 2026–: Ponte Preta

Gilson Kleina (born 30 March 1968) is a Brazilian football coach, currently the head coach of Ponte Preta.

== Managerial career ==
Born in Curitiba, Kleina started his career at Coritiba's youth setup, as a fitness coach. He later acted as Abel Braga's assistant at the same club, also having stints at Olympique de Marseille and Atléttico Mineiro. His first managerial experience occurred in 2001, with Vila Nova.

After another spell as Braga's assistant at Botafogo, Kleina took over Iraty in 2002, and subsequently was in charge of Criciúma, Paraná (three stints), Iraty, Caldense, Cianorte, Paysandu, Coruripe, Gama, Ipatinga, Caxias and Vila Nova.

On 27 August 2009, Kleina signed with Duque de Caxias Futebol Clube, as a replacement to Rodney Gonçalves. After stints at Boavista and Ipatinga, he returned to the club on 7 June 2010.

In November 2010, Kleina was appointed manager of Ponte Preta. He achieved promotion from the Série B in the end of the following year, taking the club to the main category after a six-year absence.

On 19 September 2012, Kleina was named Sociedade Esportiva Palmeiras manager, in the place of fired Luiz Felipe Scolari. Despite suffering relegation, he brought back the club to the first division as champions, but was still sacked on 8 May 2014.

On 13 August 2014, Kleina was appointed at the helm of Bahia, but resigned just three months later. The following 24 March, he was announced at Avaí.

On 11 December 2015, Kleina was presented at his first club Coritiba, now as first team manager. He left the club the following 2 June, and was named Goiás manager on 5 September.

On 23 March 2017, Kleina returned to Ponte Preta, but was relieved from his duties on 16 September. On 16 October, he was named Chapecoense manager.

Kleina was sacked by Chape on 6 August 2018, with the club seriously threatened with relegation. On 2 October, he returned to Ponte in the place of sacked Marcelo Chamusca, being sacked on 18 February 2020 after a poor start of the campaign.

On 15 August 2020, Kleina was announced manager of Náutico, replacing Gilmar Dal Pozzo. He returned to Ponte for a fifth spell on 28 May of the following year.

On 19 February 2022, after a 0–3 loss to rivals Guarani, Kleina was sacked, and returned to Chapecoense on 20 March. He was also dismissed from the latter on 5 July, after 16 matches.

On 31 January 2023, after a short period in charge of Brusque, Kleina was named head coach of Portuguesa, replacing sacked Mazola Júnior. He narrowly avoided relegation with the side in the 2023 Campeonato Paulista, but left on 17 April after failing to agree new terms.

== Managerial statistics ==
As of 10 October 2026

Managerial record by team and tenure
Team	Nat	From	To	Record							
Team	Nat	From	To	G	W	D	L	GF	GA	GD	Win %
Villa Nova	(Brazil)	1 January 2002	21 August 2002	14	7	2	5	26	23	+3	50.00
Iraty	(Brazil)	4 January 2003	22 May 2003	10	4	3	3	23	22	+1	40.00
Criciúma	(Brazil)	23 May 2003	19 February 2004	43	17	9	17	54	59	−5	39.53
Paraná	(Brazil)	29 June 2004	30 August 2004	6	3	2	1	8	6	+2	50.00
Iraty	(Brazil)	11 January 2005	24 February 2005	8	3	4	1	17	11	+6	37.50
Caldense	(Brazil)	25 February 2005	25 March 2005	6	3	2	1	7	5	+2	50.00
Cianorte	(Brazil)	1 June 2005	25 June 2005	0	0	0	0	0	0	+0	—
Paysandu	(Brazil)	25 July 2005	7 October 2005	16	4	3	9	27	38	−11	25.00
Coruripe	(Brazil)	13 May 2006	3 July 2006	6	2	1	3	6	8	−2	33.33
Paraná	(Brazil)	4 July 2006	12 December 2006	30	14	3	13	39	42	−3	46.67
Gama	(Brazil)	13 December 2006	8 April 2007	14	6	6	2	22	16	+6	42.86
Ipatinga	(Brazil)	9 April 2007	18 July 2007	17	5	6	6	16	18	−2	29.41
Paraná	(Brazil)	19 July 2007	20 August 2007	9	2	2	5	4	11	−7	22.22
Caxias	(Brazil)	8 October 2007	1 December 2008	76	35	18	23	102	70	+32	46.05
Vila Nova	(Brazil)	2 February 2009	20 May 2009	16	5	6	5	19	22	−3	31.25
Duque de Caxias	(Brazil)	27 August 2009	27 January 2010	18	9	4	5	30	20	+10	50.00
Ipatinga	(Brazil)	28 January 2010	31 May 2010	21	8	5	8	32	31	+1	38.10
Duque de Caxias	(Brazil)	7 June 2010	2 December 2010	31	14	5	12	41	40	+1	45.16
Ponte Preta	(Brazil)	3 December 2010	18 September 2012	115	48	32	35	167	144	+23	41.74
Palmeiras	(Brazil)	19 September 2012	8 May 2014	106	60	21	25	174	94	+80	56.60
Bahia	(Brazil)	13 August 2014	11 November 2014	25	6	8	11	21	26	−5	24.00
Avaí	(Brazil)	24 March 2015	10 November 2015	41	13	10	18	44	58	−14	31.71
Coritiba	(Brazil)	11 December 2015	3 June 2016	28	13	5	10	51	29	+22	46.43
Goiás	(Brazil)	3 September 2016	21 March 2017	29	14	7	8	51	35	+16	48.28
Ponte Preta	(Brazil)	23 March 2017	16 September 2017	35	13	10	12	39	41	−2	37.14
Chapecoense	(Brazil)	16 October 2017	6 August 2018	51	21	20	10	58	44	+14	41.18
Ponte Preta	(Brazil)	3 October 2018	4 December 2018	14	7	5	2	14	9	+5	50.00
Criciúma	(Brazil)	18 March 2019	5 August 2019	22	6	6	10	15	24	−9	27.27
Ponte Preta	(Brazil)	29 August 2019	18 February 2020	29	7	9	13	31	34	−3	24.14
Náutico	(Brazil)	21 August 2020	18 November 2020	17	4	5	8	18	25	−7	23.53
Ponte Preta	(Brazil)	1 June 2021	20 February 2022	38	13	11	14	41	46	−5	34.21
Chapecoense	(Brazil)	8 April 2022	5 July 2022	16	4	6	6	14	16	−2	25.00
Brusque	(Brazil)	2 September 2022	7 November 2022	11	1	3	7	3	13	−10	9.09
Portuguesa	(Brazil)	3 February 2023	19 April 2023	8	1	3	4	5	11	−6	12.50
Azuriz	(Brazil)	20 November 2023	20 May 2024	13	5	3	5	12	13	−1	38.46
FC Cascavel	(Brazil)	24 May 2024	26 July 2024	10	2	5	3	5	6	−1	20.00
Santo André	(Brazil)	17 December 2024	4 June 2025	17	6	7	4	21	16	+5	35.29
Itabaiana	(Brazil)	4 June 2025	23 September 2025	17	9	4	4	23	13	+10	52.94
Boavista	(Brazil)	1 October 2025	16 March 2026	10	2	3	5	9	15	−6	20.00
Itabaiana	(Brazil)	16 March 2026	4 May 2026	7	0	2	5	8	16	−8	0.00
Ponte Preta	(Brazil)	27 August 2026	present	8	1	0	7	1	18	−17	12.50
Total				1,008	397	266	345	1,297	1,195	+102	39.38

== Honours ==
=== Manager ===
Coruripe

- Campeonato Alagoano: 2006

Palmeiras

- Campeonato Brasileiro Série B: 2013
