= Gilmar Dal Pozzo =

Brazilian footballer and manager (born 1969)

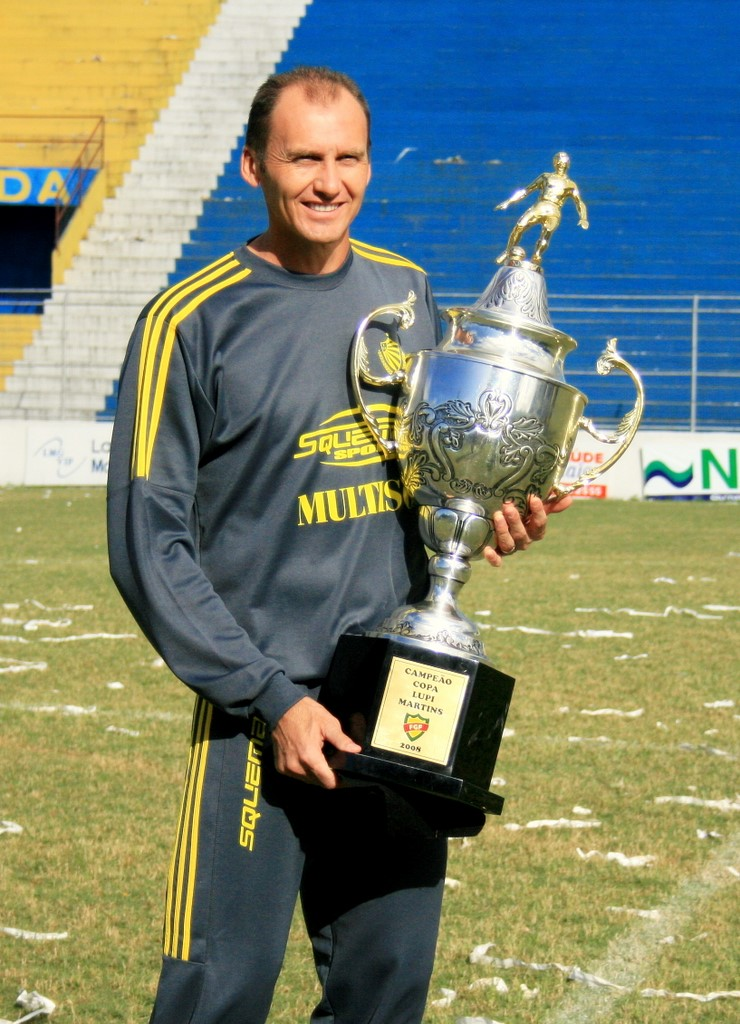
- Dal Pozzo with the Copa FGF trophy in 2008

Personal information
- Full name: Gilmar Dal Pozzo
- Date of birth: 22 November 1969 (age 56)
- Place of birth: Quilombo, Brazil
- Height: 1.94 m (6 ft 4 in)
- Position: Goalkeeper

Senior career*
Years	Team	Apps	(Gls)
1988–1990	Pratense		
1991	Caxias	7	(0)
1991	Guarany de Garibaldi	3	(0)
1992	Caxias	0	(0)
1993	Guarany de Garibaldi	23	(0)
1994–1995	Veranópolis	40	(2)
1996–2000	Caxias		
1997	→ Londrina (loan)		
2000–2003	Marítimo B	17	(0)
2000–2003	Marítimo	24	(0)
2003	Goiás	6	(0)
2004	Veranópolis	22	(1)
2004–2005	Avaí		
2006	Santa Cruz		
2006	Joinville		
2007	Veranópolis	17	(1)
2007	Ulbra		

Managerial career
- 2008: Veranópolis
- 2008: Pelotas
- 2009–2010: Veranópolis
- 2010: Novo Hamburgo
- 2011: Pelotas
- 2011–2012: Veranópolis
- 2012–2014: Chapecoense
- 2014: Criciúma
- 2015: ABC
- 2015–2016: Náutico
- 2016: Paysandu
- 2017: Ceará
- 2017: Juventude
- 2018: Brasil de Pelotas
- 2019–2020: Náutico
- 2020–2021: Paraná
- 2022: Joinville
- 2022: Sport Recife
- 2022: Chapecoense
- 2023: Ituano
- 2023: Chapecoense
- 2024: Avaí
- 2024–2026: Chapecoense
- 2026: Sport Recife
- * Club domestic league appearances and goals

Gilmar Dal Pozzo (born 1 September 1969) is a Brazilian professional football coach and former player who played as a goalkeeper.

== Playing career ==
Known as just Gilmar during his playing days, he was born in Quilombo, Santa Catarina, but moved to Santa Izabel do Oeste, Paraná at the age of two. After growing up in Paraí, Rio Grande do Sul, he began his career with Pratense at the age of 18.

Gilmar subsequently represented Caxias, Guarany de Garibaldi, Veranópolis and Londrina before moving abroad in 2000, joining Portuguese side Marítimo. He returned to his home country in 2003 with Goiás, but was a third-choice option behind Rodrigo Calaça and Harlei during his spell.

After being a regular starter for Veranópolis in the 2004 Campeonato Gaúcho (also scoring in a 2–1 home win over São José-RS on 12 May), Gilmar joined Avaí on 7 June of that year. In January 2006, he moved to Santa Cruz, but signed for Joinville on 18 June.

After another spell at Veranópolis in the 2007 Gauchão, Gilmar played for Ulbra and retiring with the club in the end of that year, aged nearly 38.

== Coaching career ==
Immediately after retiring, Dal Pozzo was confirmed as head coach of Veranópolis for the 2008 season. He led Pelotas to the 2008 Copa FGF title, before returning to VEC in February 2009.

On 22 March 2010, Dal Pozzo left Veranópolis by mutual consent, and was named Novo Hamburgo head coach on 10 June. Dismissed from the latter in October, he returned to Pelotas in December, but was also sacked on 7 February 2011.

Dal Pozzo subsequently returned to Veranópolis in March 2011, but left the side on 11 September 2012 to take over Série C side Chapecoense. He led the club to two consecutive promotions, but was sacked on 23 May 2014, after a bad start in the year's Série A.

On 5 September 2014, Dal Pozzo was appointed head coach of Criciúma also in the top tier, but was dismissed on 27 October. He was announced at the helm of ABC in the Série B on 25 May 2015, but was relieved from his duties on 15 July.

On 8 September 2015, Dal Pozzo was named in charge of Náutico also in the second division. After narrowly missing out promotion, he was sacked on 27 April of the following year.

On 8 June 2016, Dal Pozzo was announced as Dado Cavalcanti's replacement at the helm of Paysandu, still in division two. He only lasted less than two months at the club, being dismissed on 31 July after their seventh consecutive draw.

On 28 November 2016, Dal Pozzo was appointed Ceará head coach for the upcoming season, but was sacked the following 16 February, after the club's elimination from the 2017 Copa do Brasil. He agreed to a contract with Juventude on 7 March 2017, but was sacked on 21 October.

On 20 June 2018, Dal Pozzo was appointed Brasil de Pelotas head coach, but was dismissed on 29 August. He returned to Náutico on 13 May 2019, and finished the season with a promotion to the second division as champions.

Sacked by the Timbu on 12 August 2020, Dal Pozzo accepted an offer from Paraná on 3 December, but resigned on 5 January 2021. He spent more than a year unemployed before taking over Joinville on 31 January 2022, and left the club after the end of the 2022 Campeonato Catarinense.

On 12 March 2022, Dal Pozzo returned to the second tier after being named head coach of Sport Recife. Sacked on 26 June, he returned to Chape on 31 August.

Dal Pozzo left Chapecoense on 9 November 2022, after narrowly avoiding relegation, and was announced as Ituano head coach the following 10 February. Dismissed on 21 May, he returned to his previous club nine days later.

Dal Pozzo was sacked from Chapecoense on 7 August 2023, and spent nearly nine months without a club before taking over fellow second division side Avaí on 6 May 2024.

Dal Pozzo was sacked from Avaí on 5 August 2024, after a poor run of form, and returned to a fourth spell at Chape fifteen days later. He led the club back to the top tier in 2025, but was dismissed on 3 April 2026, following a 4–0 home loss to Atlético Mineiro.

On 30 June 2026, Dal Pozzo returned to Sport after being appointed in charge of the side until the end of the year, but was sacked on 6 September.

== Managerial statistics ==
As of 9 September 2026

Managerial record by team and tenure
Team	Nat	From	To	Record								Ref
Team	Nat	From	To	G	W	D	L	GF	GA	GD	Win %	Ref
Veranópolis	(Brazil)	18 December 2007	April 2008	14	5	3	6	22	23	−1	35.71	
Pelotas	(Brazil)	September 2008	December 2008	24	14	4	6	39	23	+16	58.33	
Veranópolis	(Brazil)	2 February 2009	22 March 2010	27	13	5	9	50	46	+4	48.15	
Novo Hamburgo	(Brazil)	10 June 2010	4 October 2010	8	3	3	2	12	6	+6	37.50	
Pelotas	(Brazil)	17 December 2010	7 February 2011	7	2	2	3	9	10	−1	28.57	
Veranópolis	(Brazil)	March 2011	April 2012	25	11	5	9	40	41	−1	44.00	
Chapecoense	(Brazil)	11 September 2012	23 May 2014	96	47	27	22	141	80	+61	48.96	
Criciúma	(Brazil)	5 September 2014	27 October 2014	13	3	4	6	13	17	−4	23.08	
ABC	(Brazil)	25 May 2015	15 July 2015	10	3	3	4	11	16	−5	30.00	
Náutico	(Brazil)	8 September 2015	27 April 2016	28	15	7	6	42	24	+18	53.57	
Paysandu	(Brazil)	8 June 2016	31 July 2016	13	4	8	1	11	6	+5	30.77	
Ceará	(Brazil)	28 November 2016	16 February 2017	9	5	2	2	9	4	+5	55.56	
Juventude	(Brazil)	7 March 2017	21 October 2017	39	14	10	15	35	39	−4	35.90	
Brasil de Pelotas	(Brazil)	20 June 2018	29 August 2018	12	2	6	4	9	11	−2	16.67	
Náutico	(Brazil)	13 May 2019	12 August 2020	42	21	13	8	61	42	+19	50.00	
Paraná	(Brazil)	3 December 2020	5 January 2021	6	1	1	4	3	7	−4	16.67	
Joinville	(Brazil)	31 January 2022	7 March 2022	8	2	4	2	8	11	−3	25.00	
Sport Recife	(Brazil)	12 March 2022	26 June 2022	21	8	9	4	22	11	+11	38.10	
Chapecoense	(Brazil)	31 August 2022	9 November 2022	11	5	1	5	15	13	+2	45.45	
Ituano	(Brazil)	10 February 2023	21 May 2023	18	4	5	9	16	22	−6	22.22	
Chapecoense	(Brazil)	30 May 2023	7 August 2023	11	2	4	5	9	13	−4	18.18	
Avaí	(Brazil)	6 May 2024	5 August 2024	16	6	6	4	15	12	+3	37.50	
Chapecoense	(Brazil)	20 August 2024	3 April 2026	88	37	28	23	118	94	+24	42.05	
Sport Recife	(Brazil)	30 June 2026	6 September 2026	11	3	4	4	16	15	+1	27.27	
Total				557	230	164	163	726	586	+140	41.29	—

== Honours ==
=== Player ===
Caxias

- Campeonato Gaúcho: 2000

=== Coach ===
Pelotas

- Copa FGF: 2008

Náutico

- Campeonato Brasileiro Série C: 2019
