= Quilombo, Santa Catarina =

Coordinates: 26°43′33″S 52°43′15″W

- Municipality
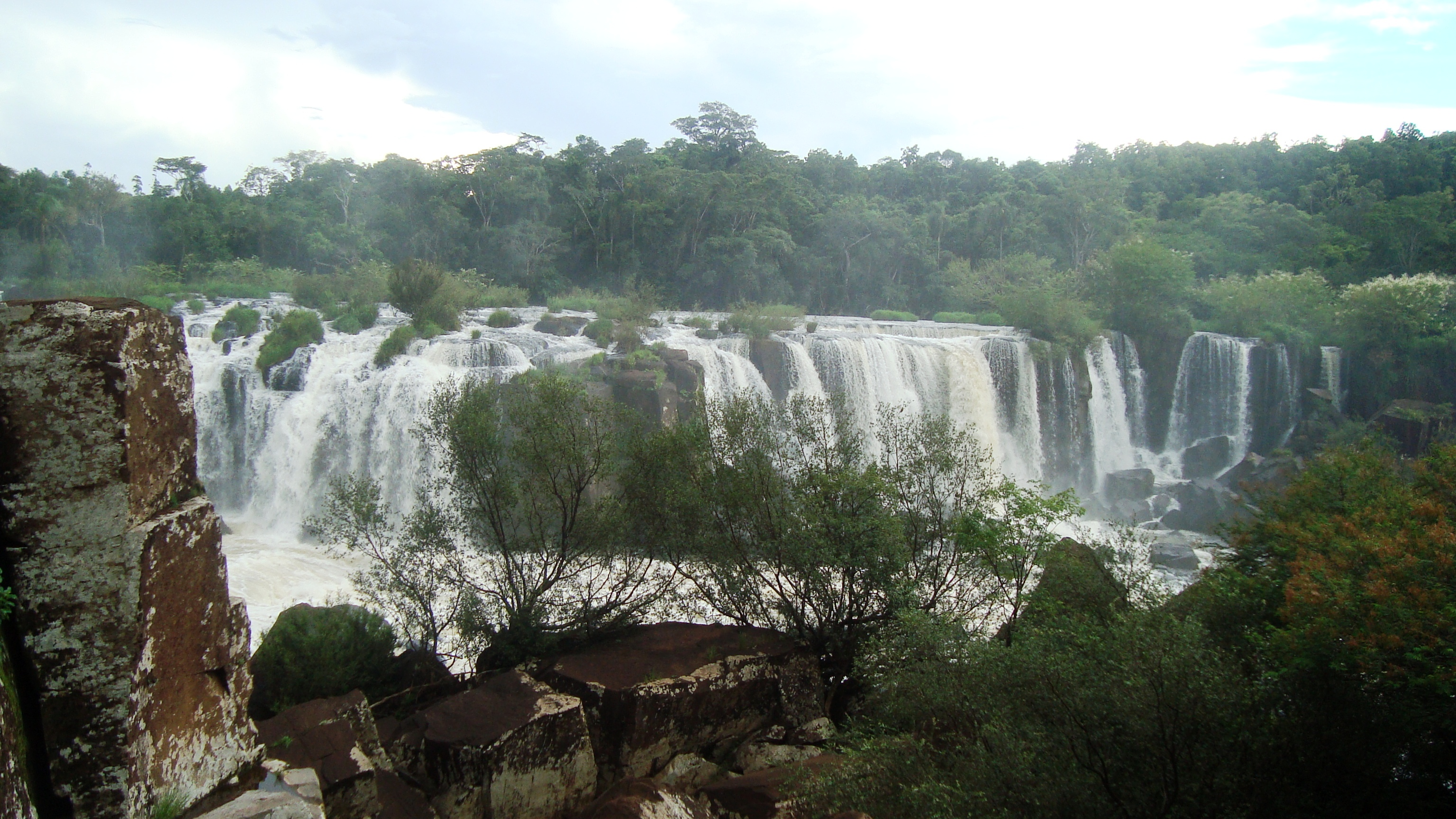

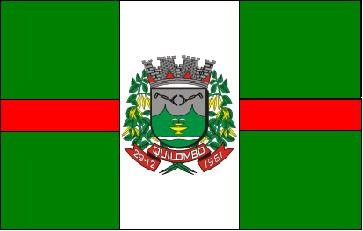
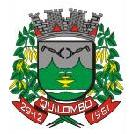
- Flag Coat of arms
- Interactive map of Quilombo, Santa Catarina
- Country: Brazil
- Region: South
- State: Santa Catarina
- Mesoregion: Oeste Catarinense

Population (2020)
  - Total: 9,829
- Time zone: UTC -3

Quilombo is a municipality in the state of Santa Catarina in the South region of Brazil.

== See also ==
- List of municipalities in Santa Catarina
