= Felipe Conceição =

Brazilian footballer and manager (born 1979)

Personal information
- Full name: Felipe de Oliveira Conceição
- Date of birth: 9 July 1979 (age 47)
- Place of birth: Nova Friburgo, Brazil
- Height: 1.84 m (6 ft 0 in)
- Position: Forward

Youth career
- Botafogo

Senior career*
Years	Team	Apps	(Gls)
1998–2004	Botafogo	12	(1)
2002–2003	→ Juventude (loan)	2	(0)
2003	→ Tombense (loan)		
2003	→ Germinal Beerschot (loan)	0	(0)
2004–2005	América Mineiro		
2005–2006	Cabofriense		
2006–2007	Portuguesa-RJ		
2007	Tupi		
2007–2009	Vitória Guimarães	4	(1)
2008–2009	→ Pontevedra (loan)	19	(4)
2009	→ Atlético Baleares (loan)	3	(0)
2010	Paulista	2	(0)
2010	Liaoning Whowin	6	(3)
2011	Cabofriense	3	(0)
Total		51	(9)

International career
1999	Brazil U20		

Managerial career
- 2012: São Gonçalo FC
- 2013: São Gonçalo EC
- 2013: Botafogo U15
- 2014–2015: Botafogo U17
- 2016: Gonçalense
- 2016–2017: Botafogo (assistant)
- 2018: Botafogo
- 2018: Macaé
- 2018–2019: América Mineiro (assistant)
- 2019–2020: América Mineiro
- 2020: Red Bull Bragantino
- 2020–2021: Guarani
- 2021: Cruzeiro
- 2021: Remo
- 2022: Chapecoense
- 2022: Náutico
- 2023: Sampaio Corrêa
- 2023: Santa Cruz
- 2024: Uberlândia
- 2024–2025: Inter de Limeira
- * Club domestic league appearances and goals

Felipe de Oliveira Conceição (born 9 July 1979) is a Brazilian professional football coach and former player who played as a forward.

== Playing career ==
Known as Felipe Tigrão or simply Tigrão as a player, he was a Botafogo youth graduate. Promoted to the first team in 1998, he struggled to make his breakthrough mainly due to injuries, and moved to Juventude in 2002.

In 2004, after an unassuming spell at Belgian side Germinal Beerschot, Tigrão returned to his home country and joined América Mineiro. In 2007, after representing Cabofriense, Portuguesa-RJ and Tupi, he again moved abroad and signed for Vitória de Guimarães in Portugal.

After being rarely used, Tigrão played two clubs on loan during the 2008–09 season: Pontevedra CF and CD Atlético Baleares, both in the Spanish Segunda División B.

Tigrão started the 2010 season with Paulista after terminating his contract with Vitória, and subsequently represented Liaoning Whowin and Cabofriense before retiring in 2011, aged 32.

== Managerial career ==
Immediately after retiring, Conceição became a director at São Gonçalo Futebol Clube, a newly registered side in the Campeonato Carioca Série C. He was named manager for the 2012 campaign, but was dismissed in April of that year.

Conceição then worked as a supervisor at Nova Iguaçu before being named manager of São Gonçalo Esporte Clube in 2013. On 3 August of that year, after winning the Carioca Série C, he returned to his first club Botafogo, being appointed at the helm of the under-15 squad. He subsequently worked with the under-17s and had a brief spell in charge of Gonçalense, when the club had a partnership with Botafogo.

Conceição then returned to Bota, being named third assistant manager; after the appointment of Jair Ventura as manager, he was promoted to the assistant role. On 23 December 2017, he was announced as manager of the first team for the upcoming campaign, replacing Ventura who had left for Santos.

On 10 February 2018, Conceição was sacked from Botafogo; he was offered his previous assistant role, but refused. On 28 March, he took over Macaé, but stepped down on 26 June to become Ricardo Drubscky's assistant at América Mineiro.

In May 2019, Conceição became a technical coordinator of América, but on 15 July, after the dismissal of Mauricio Barbieri, he was appointed first team manager. On 22 October, he renewed his contract with the club until December of the following year, but asked to leave the club on 25 January 2020 after accepting an offer from Red Bull Bragantino; he was announced as manager of the latter club two days later.

On 31 August 2020, Conceição was dismissed by Braga following a 3–0 defeat to Fortaleza. He then coached Guarani before taking over Cruzeiro for the 2021 season on 30 January 2021.

Conceição was sacked by Cruzeiro on 9 June 2021, and took over fellow second division side Remo on 1 July. He left the latter on a mutual agreement on 10 November, with only four matches for the end of the campaign.

On 15 December 2021, Conceição was named manager of Chapecoense for the ensuing campaign. The following 13 February, he resigned after accepting an offer from fellow league team Náutico, but was sacked from the latter club on 11 April.

On 18 November 2022, Conceição was named manager of Sampaio Corrêa also in the second division. The following 7 March, he was sacked.

== Honours ==
=== Manager ===
São Gonçalo EC

- Campeonato Carioca Série C: 2013

Red Bull Bragantino

- Campeonato Paulista do Interior: 2020
