= Ben-Hur (footballer) =

Brazilian footballer (born 1977)

Personal information
- Full name: Ben-Hur Moreira Peres
- Date of birth: 12 May 1977 (age 49)
- Place of birth: Bagé, Brazil
- Height: 1.82 m (6 ft 0 in)
- Positions: Centre back; midfielder

Team information
- Current team: Novorizontino (assistant)

Senior career*
Years	Team	Apps	(Gls)
1999	Guarany de Bagé		
2000	Tubarão		
2001	Brasiliense		
2001–2002	Tubarão		
2002	Ituano		
2003	União São João	14	(0)
2004	Treze		
2005	Ulbra		
2006	CRB	?	(3)
2006	Coruripe		
2007–2009	ABC	8	(0)
2010	Novo Hamburgo		
2011	Anapolina	19	(5)
2011	Vila Nova-GO	15	(0)
2012	Campinense	7	(1)
2013	CRAC	29	(0)
2014	Trindade	14	(1)
2014	Goiânia	3	(0)

Managerial career
- 2020: Lagarto (assistant)
- 2020–2023: Guarani (assistant)
- 2020: Guarani (interim)
- 2022: Guarani (interim)
- 2022: Guarani (interim)
- 2023: Guarani (interim)
- 2024–: Novorizontino (assistant)
- 2025: Novorizontino (interim)
- * Club domestic league appearances and goals

Ben-Hur Moreira Peres (born 12 May 1977), simply known as Ben-Hur, is a Brazilian football coach and former player who played as either a central defender or a defensive midfielder. He is the current assistant coach of Novorizontino.

== Honours ==
ABC

- Campeonato Potiguar: 2007, 2008

Campinense

- Campeonato Paraibano: 2012
