= Piau =

Municipality in Minas Gerais, Brazil

- Municipality
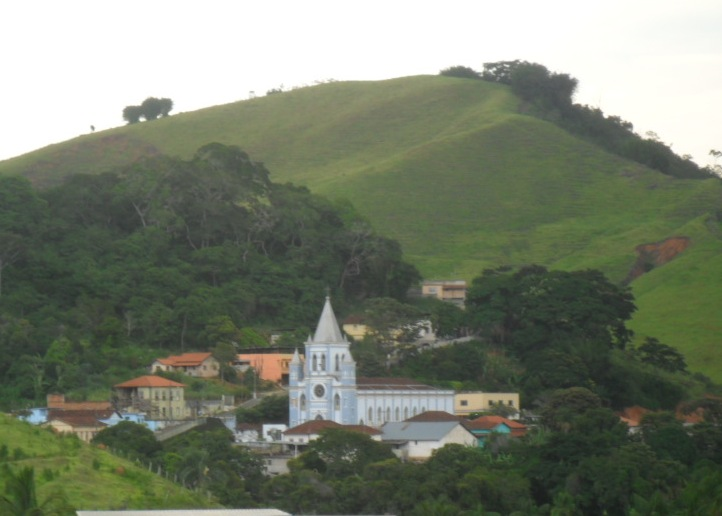
- Downtown Piau

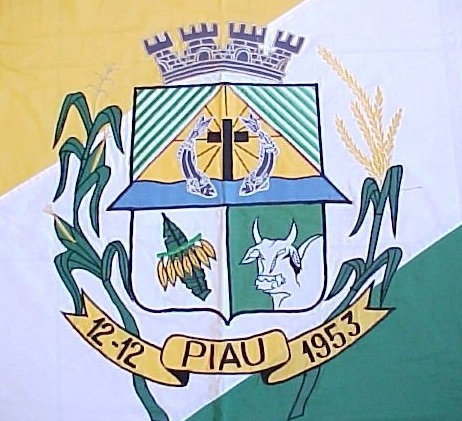
- Flag

- Location in Minas Gerais
- Coordinates: 21.5094°S 43.3228°W
- Country: Brazil
- Region: Southeast
- State: Minas Gerais

Government
  - Mayor: Wanderlúcio de Castro Loures
  - Vice Mayor: Cléber Moreira de Araújo

Area
  - Total: 192.196 km^{2} (74.207 sq mi)

Population (2022)
  - Total: 2,796
  - Estimate (2025): 2,854
  - Density: 14.55/km^{2} (37.68/sq mi)
- Demonym: piauense
- Time zone: UTC−3 (BRT)
- Website: www.piau.mg.gov.br

Piau is a municipality in the state of Minas Gerais, southeastern Brazil. It covers 192.196 km^{2} (74.207 sq mi) and had 2,796 inhabitants at the 2022 census.

Piau developed as a rural district during the nineteenth century, when coffee was grown in the surrounding area and Italian immigrants settled there. After passing between neighboring municipalities, it became part of Rio Novo in 1870. The present Igreja Matriz do Divino Espírito Santo opened in 1899, and Piau became a separate municipality in 1953.

== History ==
By 1841, Piau existed as a district, and Provincial Law No. 202 transferred it from Barbacena to Rio Pomba. Its administrative boundaries changed more than once in the decades that followed. The district became part of São João Nepomuceno in 1850, while the local parish belonged to Nossa Senhora da Conceição do Rio Novo. In 1864, Piau was transferred to Paraibuna, now Juiz de Fora.

Religious institutions were taking shape at the same time. Work on the present Igreja Matriz do Divino Espírito Santo began in 1848. The Chapel of Espírito Santo do Piau became a parish on July 22, 1868, separating it from the parish of Juiz de Fora. Piau returned to São João Nepomuceno that year and became part of Rio Novo in 1870. The parish church took decades to complete and opened on April 9, 1899.

Coffee was one of the main crops grown around Piau in the nineteenth century. Property records from the period also list transactions involving farmland and enslaved people. Italian immigrants settled in the district and worked in agriculture. Local landowners supported plans for a railway that would carry coffee through Juiz de Fora toward Rio de Janeiro. The Juiz de Fora–Piau line reached Rio Novo in 1888, but despite its name, the tracks never reached Piau.

Education gained a permanent local institution in 1918, when the state created a school in Piau by decree. For many years, classes were held in a building beside the parish church that became known as the Casarão do Povão.

Piau remained part of Rio Novo until December 12, 1953. State Law No. 1,039 separated the district from Rio Novo and created the municipality of Piau.

== Culture and tourism ==
The Igreja Matriz do Divino Espírito Santo was completed in 1899. Near the church is the Casarão do Povão, which for many years housed the state school established in 1918.

Piau holds the Festa da Banana in July, with events centered on the municipality's banana growers and their products. The festival has included concerts, handicrafts, and exhibitions of bananas and locally made products such as liqueurs and sweets. The 27th edition was held in 2017 with support from EMATER-MG, and the 34th edition was held from 9 to 12 July 2026.

== Economy ==
Banana growing is part of Piau's rural economy, and the municipality is a banana-producing center in the Zona da Mata. Local growers sell part of the harvest as fresh fruit and use surplus bananas to make products such as preserves, flour, sweets and beverages. Organic banana farming is also present in the municipality. One farm profiled by EMATER-MG produced bananas and vegetables and sold its harvest in Juiz de Fora, Petrópolis and through the National School Feeding Program.

== See also ==
- List of municipalities in Minas Gerais
