= Fernando Miguel (footballer, born 1979) =

Brazilian footballer

Personal information
- Full name: Fernando Miguel Pelissari
- Date of birth: September 10, 1979 (age 47)
- Place of birth: Jandaia do Sul, Brazil
- Height: 1.80 m (5 ft 11 in)
- Position: Defensive midfielder

Youth career
- 1996–1998: Paraná

Senior career*
Years	Team	Apps	(Gls)
1999–2001	Paraná		
2002	Cruzeiro		
2003	Paraná		
2004	Internacional		
2005	Bahia		
2006	Santa Cruz		
2007	América Mineiro		
2007–2008	Goiás		
2008	Juventus-SP		
2009	Ipatinga		
2010	Veranópolis		
2011	Botafogo-SP		
2011–2012	Atlético Sorocaba		

Managerial career
- 2015: Paraná (interim)
- 2016: Paraná (interim)
- * Club domestic league appearances and goals

Fernando Miguel Pelissari or simply Fernando Miguel (born September 10, 1979 in Jandaia do Sul) is a Brazilian retired footballer who played as a midfielder, and the current manager of Paraná Clube.

== Honours ==
Internacional

- Campeonato Gaúcho: 2004
