= Léo Condé =

Brazilian sports coach

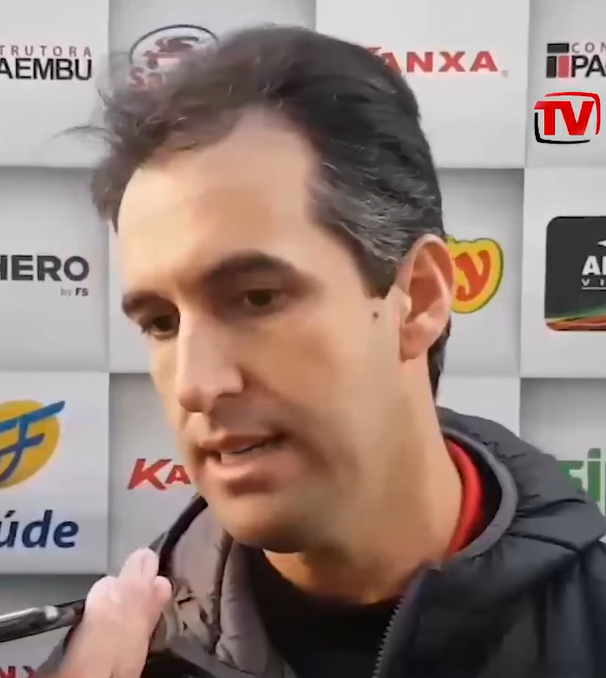
- Léo Condé in 2018

Personal information
- Full name: Leonardo Rodrigues Condé
- Date of birth: 21 April 1978 (age 48)
- Place of birth: Piau, Brazil

Managerial career
- Years: Team
- 1996–2001: Tupi (youth)
- 2001–2003: América Mineiro U17
- 2004–2006: América Mineiro U20
- 2005: América Mineiro (interim)
- 2006–2007: Atlético Mineiro U17
- 2008–2009: Atlético Mineiro U20
- 2009–2010: Tupi
- 2010: Ipatinga
- 2010–2011: Tupi
- 2011: Villa Nova
- 2012–2013: Nova Iguaçu
- 2014: Caldense
- 2014: Tupi
- 2015: Caldense
- 2015: Sampaio Corrêa
- 2016: Bragantino
- 2016: Goiás
- 2017: CRB
- 2018–2019: Botafogo-SP
- 2019: Paysandu
- 2020: São Bento
- 2020–2021: Sampaio Corrêa
- 2021–2022: Novorizontino
- 2022: Sampaio Corrêa
- 2023–2024: Vitória
- 2024–2025: Ceará
- 2026: Remo

Leonardo Rodrigues Condé (born 21 April 1978), known as Léo Condé, is a Brazilian football coach.

== Career ==
Born in Piau, Condé moved to Juiz de Fora, both in the Minas Gerais state, at the age of six. In 1996, aged 22, he started his career training the youth sides of Tupi, and worked at the club until 2001 when he received an invitation from América Mineiro.

In February 2005, Condé became an interim head coach of América's first team, replacing sacked Pintado. He led the club on eight matches before returning to his previous role, and moved to the youth sides of Atlético Mineiro in the following year.

On 16 March 2009, Condé became a head coach for the first time in his career, replacing José Carlos Amaral at the helm of his first club Tupi. He left the side on 7 June 2010, to take over Série B side Ipatinga.

Condé was sacked from Ipatinga on 11 August 2010, and returned to Tupi late in the month. On 20 May 2011, he left the latter again to take over Villa Nova in the Série D.

On 4 November 2011, Condé agreed to become the new head coach of Nova Iguacu for the upcoming season. He won the 2012 Copa Rio with the club, and left on a mutual agreement on 30 April 2013.

On 30 September 2013, Condé was announced as head coach of Caldense for the 2014 campaign. The following 4 April, however, he returned to Tupi for a third spell, with the club now in the Série C.

On 29 October 2014, after narrowly missing out promotion, Condé was dismissed from Tupi, and returned to Caldense five days later. With the latter, he reached the 2015 Campeonato Mineiro finals, losing to Atlético Mineiro.

On 8 May 2015, Condé was appointed head coach of second division side Sampaio Corrêa. He left the club on 4 December after failing to agree new terms, and was named in charge of Bragantino late in the month.

Condé was sacked from Braga on 22 May 2016, and replaced Enderson Moreira at the helm of fellow division two side Goiás on 9 June. He was also dismissed from the latter on 3 September, and was announced at CRB on 30 November.

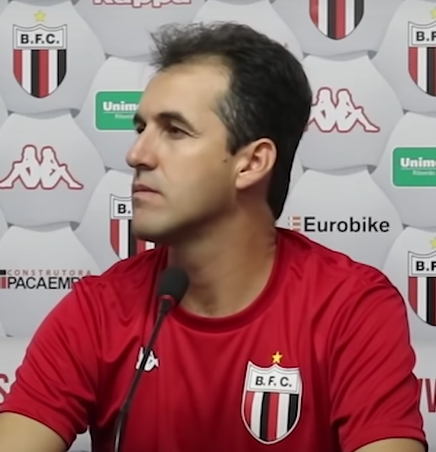
Léo Condé as head coach of Botafogo-SP in 2019

Condé left CRB on 13 June 2017, and took over Botafogo-SP on 9 October. He led the club to a promotion to the second division in 2018, but was sacked on 16 February 2019 after a poor start in the year's Campeonato Paulista.

On 26 March 2019, Condé was confirmed as head coach of Paysandu, but left on a mutual agreement on 27 May. He agreed to become São Bento's head coach on 25 November, being sacked on 25 February 2020 after six winless matches.

On 12 March 2020, Condé was announced back at Sampaio Corrêa for his second spell. He won the Campeonato Maranhense and led the club to their best finish in the Série B since 2006, before departing on 30 January 2021; hours later, he was announced at Novorizontino.

Condé was sacked from Tigre on 6 February 2022, after a poor start in the Paulistão. He returned to Sampaio on 21 March, leaving on 17 November.

On 7 February 2023, Condé became the new head coach of Vitória. He led the club to their first-ever national title, winning the 2023 Série B and achieving a top-tier promotion.

Despite winning the 2024 Campeonato Baiano, Condé was sacked from Vitória on 14 May of that year, after a poor start in the 2024 Série A. On 27 June, he returned to the second division after being named at the helm of Ceará.

Condé led Vozão to a promotion to the top tier, and won the 2025 Campeonato Cearense with the club. On 10 December 2025, after suffering immediate relegation, he left.

On 5 March 2026, Condé was announced as head coach of Remo also in the top tier. On 15 September, with the club seriously threatened with relegation, he was sacked.

== Managerial statistics ==
As of 16 September 2026

Managerial record by team and tenure
Team	Nat	From	To	Record								Ref
Team	Nat	From	To	G	W	D	L	GF	GA	GD	Win %	Ref
América Mineiro (interim)	(Brazil)	February 2005	March 2005	8	3	1	4	14	19	−5	37.50	
Tupi	(Brazil)	16 March 2009	7 June 2010	39	16	13	10	52	45	+7	41.03	
Ipatinga	(Brazil)	7 June 2010	11 August 2010	6	1	3	2	8	10	−2	16.67	
Tupi	(Brazil)	27 August 2010	20 May 2011	13	4	4	5	17	19	−2	30.77	
Villa Nova	(Brazil)	20 May 2011	4 November 2011	10	6	1	3	13	8	+5	60.00	
Nova Iguaçu	(Brazil)	4 November 2011	30 April 2013	50	19	14	17	55	54	+1	38.00	
Caldense	(Brazil)	30 September 2013	4 April 2014	12	4	4	4	12	9	+3	33.33	
Tupi	(Brazil)	4 April 2014	29 October 2014	21	9	7	5	31	19	+12	42.86	
Caldense	(Brazil)	4 November 2014	8 May 2015	15	8	6	1	19	6	+13	53.33	
Sampaio Corrêa	(Brazil)	8 May 2015	4 December 2015	37	14	13	10	49	43	+6	37.84	
Bragantino	(Brazil)	31 December 2015	22 May 2016	27	13	8	6	38	24	+14	48.15	
Goiás	(Brazil)	9 June 2016	3 September 2016	15	5	6	4	18	16	+2	33.33	
CRB	(Brazil)	30 November 2016	13 June 2017	33	16	10	7	40	23	+17	48.48	
Botafogo-SP	(Brazil)	9 October 2017	16 February 2019	42	16	12	14	45	38	+7	38.10	
Paysandu	(Brazil)	26 March 2019	27 May 2019	10	4	2	4	8	10	−2	40.00	
São Bento	(Brazil)	25 November 2019	25 February 2020	8	1	3	4	6	12	−6	12.50	
Sampaio Corrêa	(Brazil)	12 March 2020	30 January 2021	44	21	8	15	63	40	+23	47.73	
Novorizontino	(Brazil)	30 January 2021	6 February 2022	43	22	8	13	54	39	+15	51.16	
Sampaio Corrêa	(Brazil)	21 March 2022	17 November 2022	43	16	15	12	53	47	+6	37.21	
Vitória	(Brazil)	7 February 2023	14 May 2024	72	35	15	22	98	69	+29	48.61	
Ceará	(Brazil)	27 June 2024	10 December 2025	83	37	17	29	103	78	+25	44.58	
Remo	(Brazil)	5 March 2026	15 September 2026	30	8	7	15	33	43	−10	26.67	
Total				663	279	177	207	833	671	+162	42.08	—

== Honours ==
Nova Iguaçu

- Copa Rio: 2012

CRB

- Campeonato Alagoano: 2017

Sampaio Corrêa

- Campeonato Maranhense: 2020, 2022

Vitória

- Campeonato Brasileiro Série B: 2023
- Campeonato Baiano: 2024

Ceará

- Campeonato Cearense: 2025
