= Sandro Forner =

Brazilian footballer and manager

Personal information
- Full name: Sandro Alexandre Forner
- Date of birth: 16 December 1970 (age 55)
- Place of birth: Amparo, São Paulo, Brazil
- Height: 1.85 m (6 ft 1 in)
- Position: Centre back

Team information
- Current team: Paysandu (assistant)

Youth career
- 1989: Ponte Preta

Senior career*
Years	Team	Apps	(Gls)
1990–1993	Ponte Preta		
1993	ABC		
1997–1999	Coritiba		
1999–2000	Fluminense	1	(0)
2002	Joinville		
2004	Lages		
2005	ADAP Galo Maringá		
2006	Paranavaí		

International career
1986–1987	Brazil U17	3	(0)
1989–1990	Brazil U20	1	(0)

Managerial career
- 2008–2009: J. Malucelli U20
- 2009–2010: Corinthians-PR
- 2010: Atlético Paranaense (assistant)
- 2010–2012: Atlético Paranaense U20
- 2013–2014: J. Malucelli
- 2016–2017: Coritiba U20
- 2018: Coritiba
- 2019: São Paulo (assistant)
- 2019: Maringá
- 2019–2021: Ponte Preta U20
- 2021: Ponte Preta (assistant)
- 2021: Ponte Preta (interim)
- 2022–2024: Operário Ferroviário U20
- 2022: Operário Ferroviário (interim)
- 2022: Operário Ferroviário (interim)
- 2024–: Paysandu (assistant)
- 2025–: Paysandu (interim)
- * Club domestic league appearances and goals

Sandro Alexandre Forner (born 16 December 1970) is a Brazilian football coach and former player who played as a central defender. He is the current assistant coach of Paysandu.

== Playing career ==
=== Club ===
Known as Sandro during his playing days, Forner was born in Amparo, São Paulo, and was a Ponte Preta youth graduate. Promoted to the first-team in 1990, he played for a number of clubs until joining Coritiba in 1997.

After two seasons at Coxa, Forner moved to Fluminense in the Série C, but only featured in one match, a 1–1 away draw against Americano on 1 December 1999. After lifting the trophy, he featured in two more matches for the following year's Torneio Rio-São Paulo before departing.

Afterwards, Forner notably represented Joinville in 2002, ADAP Galo Maringá in 2005 (winning the Campeonato Paranaense Série Prata) and Paranavaí in 2006. He retired with the latter, aged 36.

=== International ===
While at Ponte, Forner represented Brazil at under-17 level in the 1986 South American U-17 Championship and the 1987 FIFA U-16 World Championship, and at under-20 level in the 1989 FIFA World Youth Championship and the 1990 Toulon Tournament.

== Managerial career ==
Forner started his managerial career with J. Malucelli in 2008, being manager of the club's under-20 squad. On 5 August 2009, with the club now named Corinthians Paranaense, he replaced Leandro Niehues at the helm of the main squad.

On 24 April 2010, Forner joined Niehues' staff as assistant at Atlético Paranaense, and on 26 August, he was appointed at the helm of the under-20s. On 2 November 2012, he returned to J. Malucelli and was named first-team manager for the ensuing Paranaense.

Forner returned to Coritiba in 2015, initially as an assistant of the under-23 squad. He was named manager of the under-20s ahead of the 2016 Copa São Paulo de Futebol Júnior, earning plaudits for his latter work.

On 15 December 2017, Forner was announced as first-team manager of Coritiba. He was sacked the following 15 April, after 20 games in charge.

== Honours ==
=== Player ===
ABC

- Campeonato Potiguar: 1993

Coritiba

- Campeonato Paranaense: 1999

Fluminense

- Campeonato Brasileiro Série C: 1999

ADAP Galo Maringá

- Campeonato Paranaense Série Prata: 2005
