= Dado Cavalcanti =

Brazilian footballer and manager (born 1981)

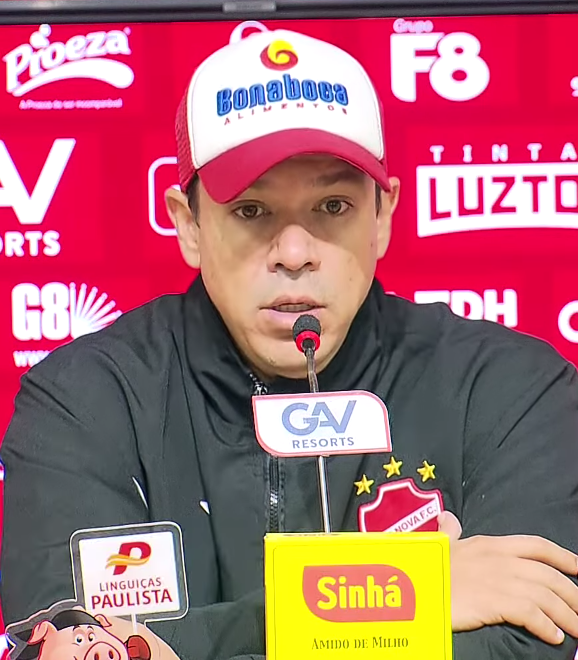
- Cavalcanti in 2022

Personal information
- Full name: Luis Eduardo Barros Cavalcanti
- Date of birth: 9 July 1981 (age 45)
- Place of birth: Arcoverde, Brazil
- Position: Left back

Youth career
- Years: Team
- 1998–2000: Santa Cruz
- 2000: Náutico

Managerial career
- 2004: Náutico (youth)
- 2005: Sport (assistant)
- 2006–2008: Ulbra Ji-Paraná
- 2008: Brazsat
- 2009–2010: Santa Cruz (assistant)
- 2009: Santa Cruz B
- 2010: Santa Cruz
- 2010–2011: América de Natal
- 2011: Central
- 2011: Icasa
- 2012: Ypiranga-PE
- 2012: Luverdense
- 2013: Mogi Mirim
- 2013: Paraná
- 2014: Coritiba
- 2014: Ponte Preta
- 2014: Náutico
- 2015: Ceará
- 2015–2016: Paysandu
- 2016: Paysandu
- 2017: Náutico
- 2017: CRB
- 2018: Paysandu
- 2018–2019: Paraná
- 2019–2020: Bahia U23
- 2020: Ferroviária
- 2020–2021: Bahia
- 2022: Vitória
- 2022: Vila Nova
- 2022–2023: Náutico
- 2023: América de Natal
- 2023: Brazil (assistant)
- 2024: Portuguesa

Luis Eduardo Barros Cavalcanti (born 9 July 1981), known as Dado Cavalcanti, is a Brazilian professional football coach and former player who played as a left back.

== Early life ==
Born in Arcoverde and raised in Caruaru, Cavalcanti joined Santa Cruz's youth setup in 1997, aged 17. Released in 2000, he moved to Naútico, but failed to impress.

== Coaching career ==
Cavalcanti began his career after an invitation from Muricy Ramalho, at that time Náutico first-team trainer, and subsequently joined the youth team's staff. In 2006, after a year as Sport's assistant, he was appointed head coach of Ulbra Ji-Paraná, and went on to win two consecutive Campeonato Rondoniense titles with the club.

Cavalcanti subsequently took over Brazsat FC during the 2008 season, winning the year's Campeonato Brasiliense Terceira Divisão. He subsequently joined Santa Cruz; initially an assistant to Lori Sandri, he became first-team coach after the latter's dismissal in early 2010.

Cavalcanti left Santa in July 2010, and was named América-RN head coach on 13 September. Despite failing to avoid relegation, he remained in charge of the club until the following March, when he was dismissed.

Cavalcanti subsequently managed Central, Icasa, Ypiranga-PE and Luverdense in the following two years, winning the Campeonato Mato-Grossense with the latter. Ahead of the 2013 season, he was appointed Mogi Mirim head coach, taking the club to the semifinals of the year's Campeonato Paulista and being named the best head coach of the tournament.

On 6 May 2013, Cavalcanti was named head coach of Paraná. On 13 December, he was appointed head coach of state rivals Coritiba for the 2014 campaign, but was sacked the following 31 March after being knocked out of the Campeonato Paranaense.

On 13 April 2014, Cavalcanti took over Ponte Preta in the place of departing Vadão, but was relieved from his duties on 21 July. On 12 August, he was named in charge of first club Náutico, leading the club to a 13th position in the Série B.

On 2 December 2014, Cavalcanti was announced as the new head coach of fellow second division side Ceará, being fired the following 12 February with only nine games in charge. Late in the month, he took over Paysandu; he won the 2016 Campeonato Paraense and the 2016 Copa Verde, but was sacked on 7 June 2016.

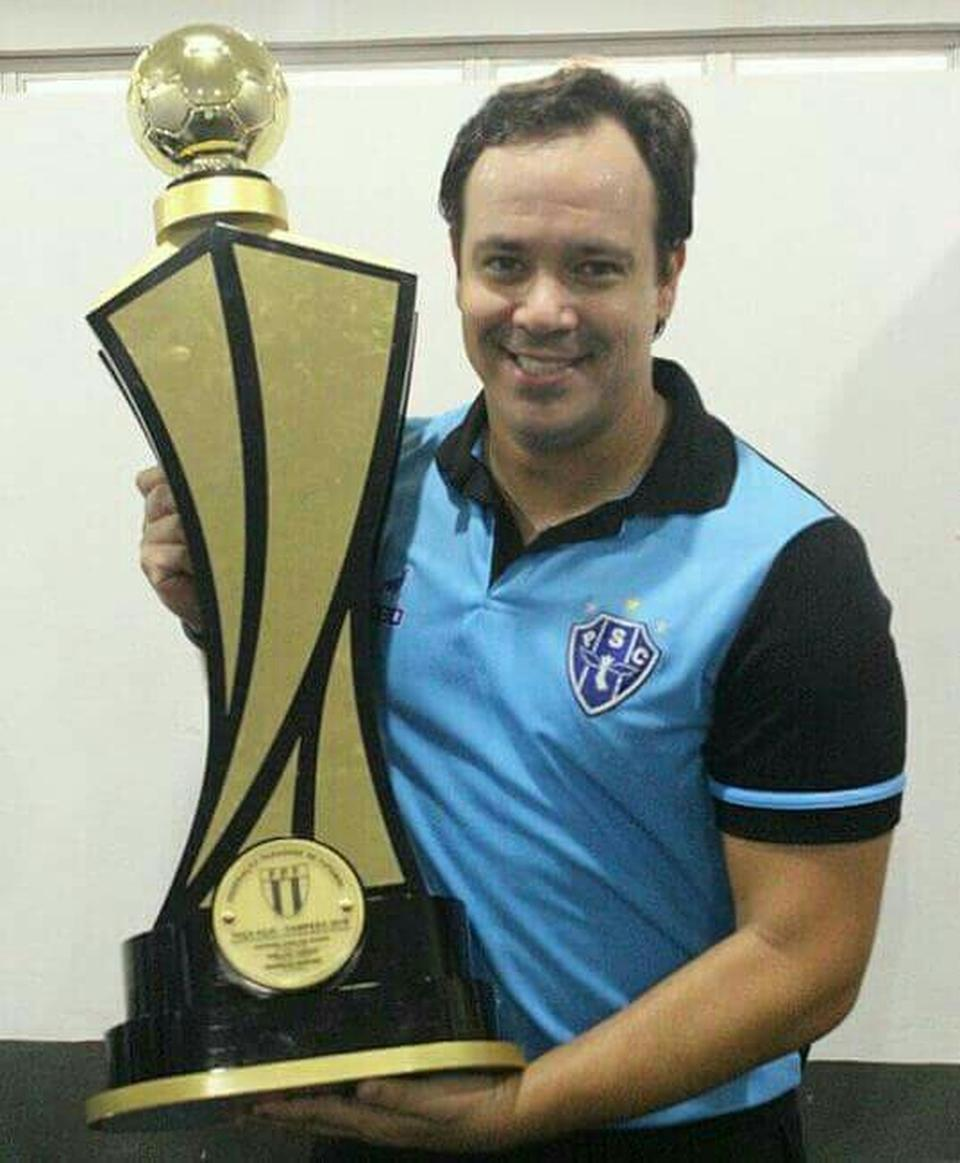
Cavalcanti with Paysandu in 2016

On 1 August 2016, however, Cavalcanti was again appointed head coach of Paysandu, remaining in charge of the club until the end of the campaign. On 2 December he was named at the helm of Náutico, but left the club on 16 February of the following year. He subsequently managed CRB, only lasting three months in charge.

Cavalcanti returned to Paysandu on 13 February 2018, but was sacked on 12 July. On 17 October, he returned to Paraná, with the club seriously threatened with relegation.

Cavalcanti was sacked from Paraná on 2 April 2019, and was subsequently named head coach of Bahia's under-23 squad late in the month. He left the club in the following April to take over Ferroviária, but was sacked on 1 October.

On 26 October 2020, shortly after being dismissed by Ferroviária, Cavalcanti returned to Bahia as a youth football coordinator. On 21 December, he was named first team head coach after the departure of Mano Menezes.

Cavalcanti won the 2021 Copa do Nordeste with Bahia, but was sacked on 17 August of that year after a poor form in the league. On 22 December, he was named head coach of rivals Vitória for the ensuing campaign.

After finishing in the fifth position in the 2022 Campeonato Baiano, Cavalcanti was replaced by Geninho on 17 March 2022. On 15 May, he returned to the second level after being named head coach of Vila Nova, but was sacked on 2 July after nine winless matches.

On 21 August 2022, Cavalcanti returned to Náutico after five years. He was kept for the 2023 season despite the club's relegation, but was sacked on 15 May 2023, after a poor start in the year's Série C.

On 10 July 2023, Cavalcanti returned to América de Natal after nearly ten years. He was unable to avoid relegation with the club, but still took part of Fernando Diniz's coaching staff in the Brazil football team, as an assistant.

On 26 October 2023, Cavalcanti was announced as head coach of Portuguesa for the 2024 season, but was dismissed the following 8 February, after just one win in five matches.

== Coaching statistics ==
As of 9 February 2024.

Coaching record by team and tenure
Team	Nat	From	To	Record								Ref
Team	Nat	From	To	G	W	D	L	GF	GA	GD	Win %	Ref
Santa Cruz	(Brazil)	6 February 2010	19 July 2010	24	12	4	8	40	27	+13	50.00	
América de Natal	(Brazil)	13 September 2010	3 March 2011	24	12	1	11	35	38	−3	50.00	
Central	(Brazil)	21 March 2011	30 April 2011	5	1	0	4	10	12	−2	20.00	
Icasa	(Brazil)	30 April 2011	26 June 2011	7	1	2	4	6	11	−5	14.29	
Ypiranga-PE	(Brazil)	1 November 2011	6 February 2012	7	2	1	4	6	14	−8	28.57	
Luverdense	(Brazil)	6 February 2012	9 November 2012	38	19	10	9	67	55	+12	50.00	
Mogi Mirim	(Brazil)	9 November 2012	6 May 2013	21	13	4	4	43	20	+23	61.90	
Paraná	(Brazil)	6 May 2013	30 November 2013	38	16	9	13	55	39	+16	42.11	
Coritiba	(Brazil)	13 December 2013	31 March 2014	11	6	3	2	18	12	+6	54.55	
Ponte Preta	(Brazil)	13 April 2014	21 July 2014	12	4	5	3	15	14	+1	33.33	
Náutico	(Brazil)	12 August 2014	1 December 2014	23	9	5	9	25	27	−2	39.13	
Ceará	(Brazil)	2 December 2014	12 February 2015	9	5	3	1	16	6	+10	55.56	
Paysandu	(Brazil)	25 February 2015	7 June 2016	86	40	21	25	134	96	+38	46.51	
Paysandu	(Brazil)	1 August 2016	25 November 2016	11	4	3	4	14	16	−2	36.36	
Náutico	(Brazil)	13 December 2016	16 February 2017	7	2	1	4	5	7	−2	28.57	
CRB	(Brazil)	17 June 2017	17 September 2017	16	7	4	5	19	20	−1	43.75	
Paysandu	(Brazil)	13 February 2018	12 July 2018	31	14	7	10	44	35	+9	45.16	
Paraná	(Brazil)	17 October 2018	2 April 2019	22	6	7	9	26	26	+0	27.27	
Ferroviária	(Brazil)	28 April 2020	1 October 2020	7	2	3	2	7	5	+2	28.57	
Bahia	(Brazil)	21 December 2020	17 August 2021	51	21	11	19	81	61	+20	41.18	
Vitória	(Brazil)	22 December 2021	17 March 2022	10	3	5	2	8	7	+1	30.00	
Vila Nova	(Brazil)	15 May 2022	2 July 2022	7	0	4	3	1	5	−4	0.00	
Náutico	(Brazil)	21 August 2022	15 May 2023	40	17	6	17	49	61	−12	42.50	
América de Natal	(Brazil)	10 July 2023	6 September 2023	7	1	4	2	4	6	−2	14.29	
Portuguesa	(Brazil)	26 October 2023	8 February 2024	5	1	0	4	4	8	−4	20.00	
Total				514	217	123	174	728	620	+108	42.22	—

== Honours ==
=== Manager ===
Ulbra Ji-Paraná

- Campeonato Rondoniense: 2006, 2007

Santa Cruz

- Copa Pernambuco: 2009

Luverdense

- Campeonato Mato-Grossense: 2012

Paysandu

- Campeonato Paraense: 2016, 2018
- Copa Verde: 2016, 2018

Bahia

- Copa do Nordeste: 2021

=== Individual ===
- Best head coach of Campeonato Pernambucano: 2010
- Best head coach of Campeonato Paulista: 2013
