= Mazola Júnior =

Brazilian footballer (born 1965)

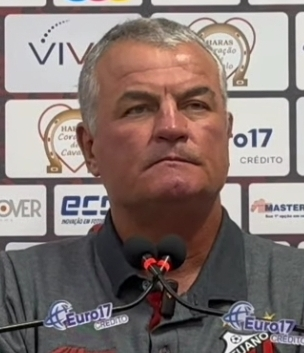
- Mazola Júnior in 2025

Personal information
- Full name: Uiles Geraldo Gonçalves de Freitas Júnior
- Date of birth: 28 February 1965 (age 61)
- Place of birth: Campinas, Brazil
- Height: 1.81 m (5 ft 11 in)
- Position: Forward

Youth career
- 1975–1982: Ponte Preta
- 1983: São Paulo
- 1983–1984: Mortara

Senior career*
Years	Team	Apps	(Gls)
1985	Marcílio Dias		
1986	CEOV		
1987	Rio Branco-SP		
1988–1989	Portimonense	11	(1)
1989–1990	Mirandela		
1990–1992	Sanjoanense	59	(21)
1992–1993	Águeda	10	(1)
Total		80	(24)

Managerial career
- 1996: Ponte Preta (assistant)
- 2002: Cruzeiro (assistant)
- 2002: Kashiwa Reysol (assistant)
- 2003–2004: Marco
- 2004–2005: Ovarense
- 2005: Atlético Mineiro (assistant)
- 2005–2008: Nelas
- 2009–2010: Ituano
- 2011: Sport Recife U20
- 2011: Sport Recife (interim)
- 2011–2012: Sport Recife
- 2012: Ipatinga
- 2013: Bragantino
- 2013: Cuiabá
- 2014: Paysandu
- 2014: Bragantino
- 2014: Paysandu
- 2015: Botafogo-SP
- 2015–2016: CRB
- 2017: Vila Nova
- 2017–2018: CRB
- 2018: Criciúma
- 2019: Ponte Preta
- 2019: Londrina
- 2020: Remo
- 2020: Vitória
- 2021–2022: Ituano
- 2022: Novorizontino
- 2023: Portuguesa
- 2024: Náutico
- 2024: Confiança
- 2024–2025: PSS Sleman
- 2025–2026: Ituano
- 2026: Paysandu
- * Club domestic league appearances and goals

Uiles Geraldo Gonçalves de Freitas Júnior (born 28 February 1965), known as Mazola Júnior, is a Brazilian professional football coach and former player who played as a forward.

== Career ==
Since 2009 he coached the Ituano in when ran the Série D and the Campeonato Paulista. learner categories of junior in Sport, has assumed interim team principal with the resignations of Geninho and PC Gusmão. assuming definitely the job for the last five games in the Série B, where led the team back to the first division 2012. remained in the club during the Campeonato Pernambucano, where were victorious vice-champion.

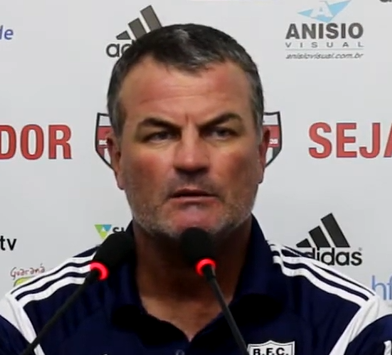
Mazola Júnior as head coach of Botafogo-SP in 2015

Then assumed the command of Ipatinga, Bragantino, Cuiabá, Paysandu. returned to the command of Bragantino and Paysandu. being that the bicolor led him back to Série B and winning the vice championship Série C 2014. In March 2015, hit with the Botafogo de Ribeirão Preto, where the led the final stages of the Paulistão 2015, dropping after sort the team.

In May 2018, he was appointed coach of Criciúma.

== Honours ==
Sport Recife

- Campeonato Pernambucano U-20: 2011

CRB

- Campeonato Alagoano: 2016

Ituano

- Campeonato Brasileiro Série C: 2021
