= List of Campeonato Brasileiro Série A top scorers =

This is a list of Campeonato Brasileiro Série A top scorers.

== All-time top scorers ==
Below is the list of players with 100 or more goals in the Campeonato Brasileiro Série A, according to the CBF (2026)

Players in bold stills active.

#	Player	Goals	Played	Ratio	First	Last
1	Roberto Dinamite	190	328	0.58	1971	1992
2	Fred	158	343	0.46	2004	2022
3	Romário	154	251	0.61	1985	2007
4	Edmundo	153	316	0.48	1992	2008
5	Zico	135	249	0.54	1971	1989
6	Diego Souza	130	472	0.28	2003	2021
7	Túlio	129	241	0.54	1988	2005
8	Serginho	127	184	0.69	1974	1990
9	Dario	127	278	0.53	1969	1985
10	Washington	126	201	0.63	1999	2010
11	**Gabriel Barbosa**	126	306	0.41	2013	2026
12	Luís Fabiano	116	212	0.55	1998	2017
13	Wellington Paulista	109	442	0.25	2004	2023
14	Paulo Baier	107	404	0.26	1997	2014
15	Alecsandro	105	330	0.32	2001	2019
16	Kléber Pereira	102	195	0.52	1999	2010
17	Pelé	101	173	0.58	1959	1974
18	Evair	101	249	0.41	1986	2003

== Scoring by season ==
This is the list of Campeonato Brasileiro Série A top scorers season by season.

=== Copa dos Campeões Estaduais ===
Year	Footballer	Club	Goals
1937	Paulista	Atlético Mineiro	8

=== Taça Brasil ===
Year	Footballer	Club	Goals
1959	Léo	Bahia	8
1960	Bececê	Fortaleza	7
1961	Pelé	Santos	7
1962	Coutinho	Santos	7
1963	Carlos Ruiter	Confiança	9
1964	Pelé (2)	Santos	7
1965	Bita	Náutico	9
1966	Bita (2)	Náutico	10
1966	Toninho Guerreiro	Santos	10
1967	Chicletes	Treze	9
1968	Ferretti	Botafogo	7

=== Roberto Gomes Pedrosa ===
Year	Footballer	Club	Goals
1967	Ademar Pantera	Flamengo	15
1967	César Maluco	Palmeiras	15
1968	Toninho Guerreiro (2)	Santos	18
1969	Edu	America-RJ	14
1970	Tostão	Cruzeiro	12

=== Série A ===
Year	Footballer	Club	Goals
1971	Dario	Atlético Mineiro	15
1972	Dario (2)	Atlético Mineiro	17
1972	Pedro Rocha	São Paulo	17
1973	Ramón	Santa Cruz	21
1974	Roberto Dinamite	Vasco da Gama	16
1975	Flávio	Internacional	16
1976	Dario (3)	Internacional	16
1977	Reinaldo	Atlético Mineiro	28
1978	Paulinho	Vasco da Gama	19
1979	César	America-RJ	13
1980	Zico	Flamengo	21
1981	Nunes	Flamengo	16
1982	Zico (2)	Flamengo	21
1983	Serginho Chulapa	Santos	22
1984	Roberto Dinamite (2)	Vasco da Gama	16
1985	Edmar	Guarani	20
1986	Careca	São Paulo	25
1987	Müller	São Paulo	10
1988	Nílson	Internacional	15
1989	Túlio	Goiás	11
1990	Charles	Bahia	11
1991	Paulinho	Santos	15
1992	Bebeto	Vasco da Gama	18
1993	Guga	Santos	15
1994	Túlio (2)	Botafogo	13
1994	Amoroso	Guarani	13
1995	Túlio (3)	Botafogo	23
1996	Paulo Nunes	Grêmio	16
1996	Renaldo	Atlético Mineiro	16
1997	Edmundo	Vasco da Gama	29
1998	Viola	Santos	21
1999	Guilherme	Atlético Mineiro	28
2000	Adhemar	São Caetano	22
2001	Romário	Vasco da Gama	21
2002	Rodrigo Fabri	Grêmio	19
2002	Luís Fabiano	São Paulo	19
2003	Dimba	Goiás	31
2004	Washington	Athletico Paranaense	34
2005	Romário (2)	Vasco da Gama	22
2006	Souza	Goiás	17
2007	Josiel	Paraná Clube	20
2008	Kléber Pereira	Santos	21
2008	Keirrison	Coritiba	21
2008	Washington (2)	Fluminense	21
2009	Diego Tardelli	Atlético Mineiro	19
2009	Adriano	Flamengo	19
2010	Jonas	Grêmio	23
2011	Borges	Santos	23
2012	Fred	Fluminense	20
2013	Éderson	Athletico Paranaense	21
2014	Fred (2)	Fluminense	18
2015	Ricardo Oliveira	Santos	20
2016	Diego Souza	Sport Recife	14
2016	William Pottker	Ponte Preta	14
2016	Fred (3)	Atlético Mineiro (12)	14
2016	Fred (3)	Fluminense (2)	14
2017	Jô	Corinthians	18
2017	Henrique Dourado	Fluminense	18
2018	Gabriel Barbosa	Santos	18
2019	Gabriel Barbosa (2)	Flamengo	25
2020	Claudinho	Bragantino	18
2020	Luciano	São Paulo	18
2021	Hulk	Atlético Mineiro	19
2022	German Cano	Fluminense	26
2023	Paulinho	Atlético Mineiro	20
2024	Alerrandro	Vitória	15
2024	Yuri Alberto	Corinthians	15
2025	Kaio Jorge	Cruzeiro	21

== Top Scorer by player ==
TS	Footballer	Nationality	Years
3	Dario	Brazil	1971, 1972 e 1976
3	Túlio	Brazil	1989, 1994 e 1995
3	Fred	Brazil	2012, 2014 e 2016
2	Pelé	Brazil	1961 e 1964
2	Bita	Brazil	1965 e 1966
2	Toninho	Brazil	1966 e RGP - 1968
2	Zico	Brazil	1980 e 1982
2	Roberto Dinamite	Brazil	1974 e 1984
2	Romário	Brazil	2001 e 2005
2	Washington	Brazil	2004 e 2008
2	Gabriel Barbosa	Brazil	2018 e 2019

== Top scorers by club ==
Club	Top scorers	Years
Santos	13	1961, 1962, 1964, 1966, RGP - 1968, 1983, 1991, 1993, 1998, 2008, 2011, 2015, 2018
Atlético Mineiro	10	1937, 1971, 1972, 1977, 1996, 1999, 2009, 2016, 2021, 2023
Vasco da Gama	7	1974, 1978, 1984, 1992, 1997, 2001, 2005
Flamengo	6	RGP - 1967, 1980, 1981, 1982, 2009, 2019
Fluminense	6	2008, 2012, 2014, 2016, 2017, 2022
São Paulo	5	1972, 1986, 1987, 2002, 2020
Internacional	3	1975, 1976, 1988
Botafogo	3	TB - 1968, 1994, 1995
Goiás	3	1989, 2003, 2006
Grêmio	3	1996, 2002, 2010
Náutico	2	1965, 1966
America-RJ	2	1969, 1979
Bahia	2	1959, 1990
Guarani	2	1985, 1994
Athletico Paranaense	2	2004, 2013
Corinthians	2	2017, 2024
Cruzeiro	2	1970, 2025
Fortaleza	1	1960
Confiança	1	1963
Treze	1	TB - 1967
Palmeiras	1	RGP - 1967
Santa Cruz	1	1973
São Caetano	1	2000
Paraná Clube	1	2007
Coritiba	1	2008
Ponte Preta	1	2016
Sport Recife	1	2016
Bragantino	1	2020
Vitória	1	2024

== See also ==
- Brazilian Football Confederation (CBF)
- List of Copa do Brasil top scorers
