= List of Copa do Brasil top scorers =

This is a list of all Copa do Brasil top scorers.

== By edition ==
Year	Player (team)	Goals
1989	Gérson (Atlético Mineiro)	6
1990	Bizu (Náutico)	7
1991	Gérson (Atlético Mineiro)	6
1992	Gérson (Internacional)	9
1993	Gilson (Grêmio)	8
1994	Paulinho McLaren (Internacional)	6
1995	Sávio (Flamengo)	7
1996	Luizão (Palmeiras)	8
1997	Paulo Nunes (Grêmio)	9
1998	Romário (Flamengo)	7
1999	(Federal Republic of Yugoslavia) Dejan Petković (Vitória); Romário (Flamengo)	7
2000	Oséas (Cruzeiro)	10
2001	Washington (Ponte Preta)	11
2002	Deivid (Corinthians)	13
2003	Nonato (Bahia)	9
2004	Alex Alves (Botafogo); Dauri (15 de Novembro)	8
2005	Fred (Cruzeiro)	14
2006	Valdiram (Vasco da Gama)	7
2007	André Lima (Botafogo); Dênis Marques (Atlético Paranaense); Dimba (Brasiliense); Victor Simões (Figueirense)	5
2008	Edmundo (Vasco da Gama); Wellington Paulista (Botafogo)	6
2009	Taison (Internacional)	7
2010	Neymar (Santos)	11
2011	Adriano (Palmeiras); Alecsandro (Vasco da Gama); Kléber (Palmeiras); Rafael Coelho (Avaí); William (Avaí)	5
2012	Luís Fabiano (São Paulo)	8
2013	Hernane (Flamengo)	8
2014	Bill (Ceará); Gabriel Barbosa (Santos); Léo Gamalho (Santa Cruz)	6
2015	Gabriel Barbosa (Santos)	8
2016	Marinho (Vitória)	6
2017	Léo Gamalho (Goiás) (Paraguay) Lucas Barrios (Grêmio); Rafael Sóbis (Cruzeiro)	5
2018	Gabriel Barbosa (Santos); Neilton (Vitória); Rômulo (Avaí)	4
2019	Luciano (Fluminense) (Peru) Paolo Guerrero (Internacional); Pipico (Santa Cruz)	5
2020	Brenner (São Paulo); Léo Gamalho (CRB); Nenê (Fluminense); Rodolfo (América Mineiro)	6
2021	Hulk (Atlético Mineiro)	8
2022	(Argentina) Germán Cano (Fluminense); Giuliano (Corinthians)	6
2023	Alef Manga (Coritiba); Lorran (Nova Mutum); Pedro (Flamengo); Tiquinho Soares (Botafogo)	5
2024	(Argentina) Pablo Vegetti (Vasco da Gama)	7
2025	Kaio Jorge (Cruzeiro); Rayan (Vasco da Gama)	5

== All-time top scorers ==
Following is the list with the all-time top scorers of Copa do Brasil:

As of 2022 season

Rank	Nation	Player	Goals	Games	Goal ratio
1	(Brazil)	Fred	37	56	0.67
2	(Brazil)	Romário	36	46	0.78
3	(Brazil)	Gabriel Barbosa	30	56	0.54
4	(Brazil)	Viola	29	44	0.65
5	(Brazil)	Oséas	28	53	0.53
5	(Brazil)	Paulo Nunes	28	58	0.48
7	(Brazil)	Dodô	26	48	0.54
7	(Brazil)	Léo Gamalho	26	39	0.67
9	(Brazil)	Luís Fabiano	25	37	0.67
10	(Brazil)	Deivid	24	34	0.70
10	(Brazil)	Evair	24	36	0.66
12	(Brazil)	Gérson	23	26	0.88
12	(Brazil)	Marcelinho Carioca	23	56	0.41

== Multiple times ==
Footballer	Times	Years
Gabriel Barbosa	3	2014, 2015, 2018
Gérson	3	1989, 1991, 1992
Léo Gamalho	3	2014, 2017, 2020
Romário	2	1998, 1999

== See also ==
- Brazilian Football Confederation (CBF)
- List of Campeonato Brasileiro Série A top scorers
