= Toe punt =

Method of kicking in association football

A toe punt (also known as a toe-poke, toe poker or a toe-ender) is a method of kicking the ball in association football and occasionally in Australian rules football. Unlike other methods of kicking, the toe punt uses the front of the boot rather than the instep or laces.

Toe punts (known as "straight-on" or "straight-toe") were the predominant form of kicking for placekickers in gridiron-based forms of football until the 1960s. A special boot was used with a flat front surface, as using a toe kick with a regular shoe with a rounded or pointed toe could cause the ball to travel in an unpredictable direction. The introduction of instep kicking (known as the "soccer-style kick") to the game in the 1960s, along with a rule change in 1977 banning the special shoe (one of several rules introduced to curb the influence of kickers in the game), eventually led to the end of the use of toe kicks in American and Canadian football.

== Notable toe punts ==
- The toe-poke is deemed to be Romário’s trademark finish. His opening goal in a hat-trick for Barcelona against Real Madrid in 1994 saw him drag the ball around the defender without it leaving his foot before finishing with a toe-poke into the corner of the net. Another memorable Romário toe-poke finish occurred at the 1994 World Cup against Sweden.
- Ronaldo scored what he called “a Romário-style goal” for Brazil against Turkey in the 2002 World Cup semi-final with a toe-poke finish with little back-lift while on the run – a finish he learned while playing futsal in his youth.
- Ronaldinho scored with a spectacular toe-poke for FC Barcelona against Chelsea in 2005 where he feinted to shoot before striking the ball with a no back-lift toe-poke past Chelsea goalkeeper Petr Čech from 20 yards out.
- Oscar scored for Brazil with a toe-poke in the opening match of the 2014 World Cup against Croatia, before paying tribute to the master of the art in a post-game press conference, “It was a Romário goal. Most of us in the team have played futsal, where you use the toe a lot. It was the only thing I could do at that moment.”
- In the AFL, Geelong Cats player Matthew Scarlett famously employed a toe-poke in the final minutes of the 2009 AFL Grand Final which led to a match-winning goal from Paul Chapman via Gary Ablett Jr. and Travis Varcoe.

== See also ==
- Shooting
