= Mário Juliato =

Brazilian footballer and coach

Personal information
- Date of birth: 21 May 1944 (age 82)
- Place of birth: Valinhos, Brazil
- Position: Center back

Youth career
- 1959–1963: Valinhense

Senior career*
Years	Team	Apps	(Gls)
1963–1966	Ponte Preta		

Managerial career
- 1976: São Paulo (caretaker)
- 1977: Valinhense
- 1978: Ponte Preta (U-20)
- 1978: São Paulo
- 1980: Coritiba
- 1981: Internacional
- 1981: Vitória
- 1984: Sport
- 1986: Goiás
- 1987–1988: Rio Ave
- 1988: Goiás
- 1992: Náutico
- 1993: Ceará
- 1994: Náutico
- 1996: Paraná Clube
- * Club domestic league appearances and goals

Mário Juliato (born May 21, 1944) is a Brazilian former football player and coach.

He started his professional career at Ponte Preta as a center back, but prematurely ended his career because of a seriously injured knee when he was 22. Then he started his managerial career working in youth teams of Ponte Preta. Later, Juliato managed São Paulo, Coritiba, Náutico, Portuguesa, Vitória, Fortaleza, Santa Cruz, Goiás, Ceará, Internacional, Maringá and CSA.

== Honours ==
=== São Paulo ===
- Torneio Nunes Freire: 1976
