= Adriano (footballer, born September 1987) =

Brazilian footballer

Adriano Michael Jackson
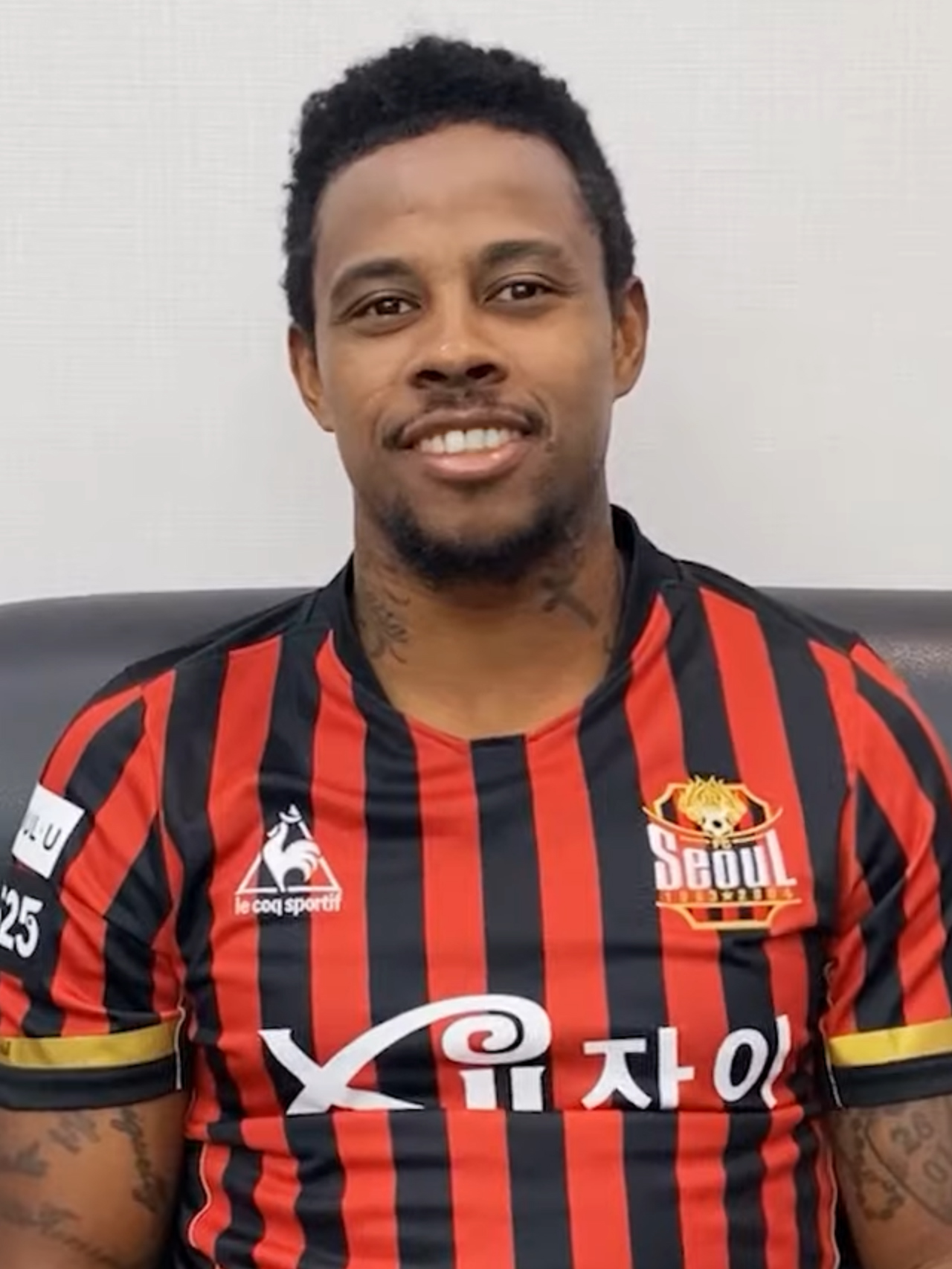
- Adriano in 2020

Personal information
- Full name: Carlos Adriano de Sousa Cruz
- Date of birth: 28 September 1987 (age 39)
- Place of birth: Valença, Brazil
- Position: Forward

Team information
- Current team: Jacuipense

Youth career
- 2005–2007: Bahia

Senior career*
Years	Team	Apps	(Gls)
2007–2008	Ceará		
2009–2010	America-RJ	39	(17)
2010–2011	Fluminense	0	(0)
2010	→ Bahia (loan)	26	(15)
2011	→ Palmeiras (loan)	20	(1)
2011–2013	Dalian Shide	34	(7)
2013	→ Bahia (loan)	8	(1)
2013	→ Atlético Goianiense (loan)	10	(0)
2014–2015	Daejeon Citizen	49	(34)
2015–2016	FC Seoul	43	(25)
2017	Shijiazhuang Ever Bright	24	(10)
2018–2019	Jeonbuk Hyundai Motors	26	(8)
2020	FC Seoul	7	(0)
2021	Jacuipense	5	(2)
2021	Santa Cruz	4	(0)
2022	Jacuipense	3	(0)
2023	Juazeirense	5	(1)
2023	Atlético de Alagoinhas	13	(4)
2024	Jacuipense	7	(1)
Total		323	(126)
- * Club domestic league appearances and goals

Carlos Adriano de Sousa Cruz (born 28 September 1987), commonly known as Adriano Michael Jackson, is a Brazilian former professional footballer who plays as a forward.

== Club career ==
=== Early career ===
Adriano played for many Brazilian clubs including Ceará, America-RJ, Bahia, and Palmeiras.

When playing for America-RJ, Adriano had 39 appearances, 17 goals, and a Campeonato Carioca Série B title. Adriano also gave a memorable moment to his role model Romário by being replaced with him in the 68th minute of a match against Artsul, the last match of Romário's playing career.

Adriano scored 15 goals at 2010 Campeonato Brasileiro Série B, leading Bahia to be promoted to the Série A. When playing for Palmeiras the next year, he had scored four goals in a 5–1 Copa do Brasil win over Comercial-PI, and became joint-top scorer with five goals at the end of the tournament.

=== Dalian Shide ===
On 8 June 2011, Adriano transferred to Chinese Super League side Dalian Shide on a four-year deal with a reported fee of $3.8 million. He made his Super League debut for Dalian on 14 June 2011 in a 2–0 home victory against Chengdu Blades, coming on as a substitute for Ahn Jung-hwan in the second half. His first goal in China came on 7 August 2011, which ensured Dalian Shide a 1–1 draw against Liaoning Whowin. He managed to score 4 goals in 12 appearances in the 2011 league season.

On 26 June 2012, Adriano had five goals and three assists in a 8–0 Chinese FA Cup win over Yanbian Baekdu Tigers, getting involved in all eight goals of the match. He scored the most goals in a single Chinese FA Cup match, breaking the previous record of four goals, set by Wang Tao in 1998 and Mark Williams in 1999.

=== Daejeon Citizen ===
On 13 March 2014, Adriano joined K League 2 club Daejeon Citizen. He brought Daejeon a K League 2 title and the promotion to the K League 1, and became the league's top goalscorer with 27 goals in 32 appearances. He received the K League Most Valuable Player Award at the end of the season. However, Daejeon excessively depended on Adriano's performances at the time, and the way was faced with a limitation at the K League 1. After manager Cho Jin-ho was replaced by Choi Moon-sik due to poor results early in the 2015 season, Adriano lost ground at Daejeon in the name of tactical changes.

=== FC Seoul ===
On 28 July 2015, Adriano joined another K League 1 club FC Seoul. He scored winning goals in a 2–1 semi-final win over Ulsan Hyundai and a 3–1 final win over Incheon United at the 2015 Korean FA Cup, showing his influence at Seoul directly.

Adriano scored nine goals in the first three group stage matches of the 2016 AFC Champions League, and was named the tournament's Player of the Week three consecutive times. Afterwards, he added four goals until the semi-finals, becoming the top goalscorer at the Champions League with 13 goals. He also became the top scorer at the 2016 Korean FA Cup with five goals, and helped Seoul win the 2016 K League 1. During the 2016 season, he scored a total of 35 goals including 17 K League 1 goals. He surpassed Kim Do-hoon, who scored 34 goals in 2003, setting a record for scoring the most goals for a year at a K League club.

After a successful career in South Korea, Adriano once again moved to China, signing for China League One club Shijiazhuang Ever Bright on 16 January 2017. He and Shijiazhuang finished third at the 2017 China League One, failing to be promoted to the Chinese Super League.

In 2018, Adriano returned to South Korea, playing for K League 1 club Jeonbuk Hyundai Motors. He won a K League 1 title again, but his capability was halved in comparison to his former self at Seoul. The next year, he rejoined FC Seoul on a one-year contract, but his condition was not revitalised.

== Personal life ==
He is nicknamed Adriano Michael Jackson due to his moonwalking goal celebrations.

== Career statistics ==
As of 1 March 2025

Appearances and goals by club, season and competition
Club	Season	League			State league		Cup		Continental		Other		Total	
Club	Season	Division	Apps	Goals	Apps	Goals	Apps	Goals	Apps	Goals	Apps	Goals	Apps	Goals
America-RJ	2009	—			24 (Note: Appearances in Campeonato Carioca Série B)	11	—		—		—		24	11
America-RJ	2010	Série D	—		15 (Note: Appearances in Campeonato Carioca)	6	—		—		—		15	6
America-RJ	Total		—		39	17	—		—		—		39	17
Fluminense	2010	Série A	—		—		—		—		—		—	
Bahia (loan)	2010	Série B	26	15	—		—		—		—		26	15
Palmeiras (loan)	2011	Série A	6	0	14 (Note: Appearances in Campeonato Paulista)	1	4	5	—		—		24	6
Dalian Shide	2011	Chinese Super League	12	4	—		—		—		—		12	4
Dalian Shide	2012	Chinese Super League	22	3	—		1	5	—		—		23	8
Dalian Shide	Total		34	7	—		1	5	—		—		35	12
Bahia (loan)	2013	Série A	0	0	8 (Note: Appearances in Campeonato Baiano)	1	1	0	—		—		9	1
Atlético Goianiense (loan)	2013	Série B	10	0	—		0	0	—		—		10	0
Daejeon Citizen	2014	K League 2	32	27	—		0	0	—		—		32	27
Daejeon Citizen	2015	K League 1	17	7	—		1	1	—		—		18	8
Daejeon Citizen	Total		49	34	—		1	1	—		—		50	35
FC Seoul	2015	K League 1	13	8	—		2	2	—		—		15	10
FC Seoul	2016	K League 1	30	17	—		6	5	11	13	—		47	35
FC Seoul	Total		43	25	—		8	7	11	13	—		62	45
Shijiazhuang Ever Bright	2017	China League One	24	10	—		0	0	—		—		24	10
Jeonbuk Hyundai Motors	2018	K League 1	25	8	—		2	1	6	5	—		33	14
Jeonbuk Hyundai Motors	2019	K League 1	1	0	—		1	0	1	1	—		3	1
Jeonbuk Hyundai Motors	Total		26	8	—		3	1	7	6	—		36	15
FC Seoul	2020	K League 1	7	0	—		1	0	1	0	—		9	0
Jacuipense	2021	Série C	—		5	2	—		—		—		5	2
Santa Cruz	2021	Série C	2	0	2 (Note: Appearances in Campeonato Pernambucano)	0	—		—		—		4	0
Jacuipense	2022	Série D	3	0	—		—		—		—		3	0
Juazeirense	2023	—			5	1	—		—		—		5	1
Atlético de Alagoinhas	2023	Série D	13	4	—		1	0	—		4 (Note: Appearances in Copa do Nordeste)	1	18	5
Jacuipense	2024	Série D	3	1	4	0	1	0	—		—		8	1
Career total			246	104	77	22	21	19	19	19	4	1	367	165

== Honours ==
America-RJ

- Campeonato Carioca Série B: 2009

Daejeon Citizen

- K League 2: 2014

FC Seoul

- K League 1: 2016
- Korean FA Cup: 2015

Jeonbuk Hyundai Motors

- K League 1: 2018

Individual

- Copa do Brasil top goalscorer: 2011
- K League 2 Most Valuable Player: 2014
- K League 2 top goalscorer: 2014
- K League 2 Best XI: 2014
- K League 1 Best XI: 2015, 2016
- AFC Champions League top goalscorer: 2016
- Korean FA Cup top goalscorer: 2016
