= Bruno Bonetti =

Brazilian politician

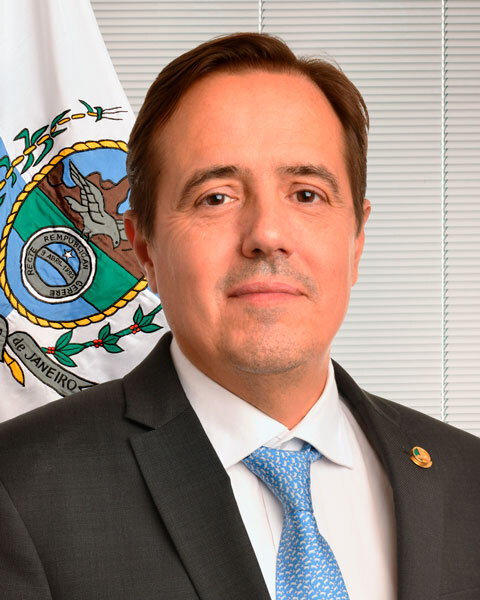
- Official portrait, 2025

Senator for Rio de Janeiro
- In office 16 December 2025 – 9 April 2026
- Preceded by: Romário Faria
- Succeeded by: Romário Faria

Personal details
- Born: Bruno Bierrenbach Bonetti; 26 August 1972 (age 54) Rio de Janeiro, Guanabara, Brazil
- Party: Liberal Party
- Spouse: Suellen Bonetti
- Children: 1
- Parents: José Benedito Bonetti (father); Sheila de Albuquerque Bierrenbach (mother)

Bruno Bonetti is a former senator for the State of Rio de Janeiro.

He was elected on the list of Senator Romário, who had stepped aside to allow him to represent the state, in accordance with a pre-election agreement. He led the Rio de Janeiro section of the Liberal Party (PL).
