= Waldemar Lemos =

Brazilian football manager (born 1954)

Personal information
- Full name: Waldemar Lemos de Oliveira
- Date of birth: June 5, 1954 (age 72)
- Place of birth: Rio de Janeiro, Brazil

Youth career
- Years: Team
- 1969–1971: Vasco da Gama

Managerial career
- 1986: Mesquita
- 2000: São Cristóvão
- 2001: Goytacaz
- 2002: Fluminense
- 2002–2003: São Paulo (assistant)
- 2003: Flamengo
- 2006: Flamengo
- 2006: Figueirense
- 2007: Cabofriense
- 2007: Paulista
- 2007–2008: Joinville
- 2008–2009: Harbour View
- 2009: Náutico
- 2009: Atlético Paranaense
- 2010: Pohang Steelers
- 2011: Cabofriense
- 2011: Duque de Caxias
- 2011–2012: Náutico
- 2012: Sport
- 2013: Atlético Goianiense
- 2013: ABC
- 2014: América do Recife
- 2014: Vila Nova
- 2015: Boavista
- 2016: Anápolis
- 2016: Remo
- 2017: Ríver
- 2017: Anápolis
- 2017: Náutico
- 2018: Altos
- 2018–2019: Anápolis
- 2019: Capital Clube
- 2019–: Anapolina

Waldemar Lemos de Oliveira, commonly known as Waldemar Lemos (born June 5, 1954), is a Brazilian professional football coach who manages Remo.

Born in Rio de Janeiro, he managed several clubs during his career as a head coach. With Fluminense, he won the Campeonato Carioca in 2002.

== Honors ==
Fluminense

- Campeonato Carioca: 2002

Naútico

- Copa Pernambuco: 2011

Associação Brasileira de Treinadores de Futebol

- Vice Presidente: 2018
