= Romário =

Brazilian politician and footballer (born 1966)

- Official portrait, 2023

Senator for Rio de Janeiro
- Incumbent
- Assumed office 1 February 2015 (Note: On leave from 9 December 2025 to 9 April 2026; during this period, the position was held by Bruno Bonetti.)
- Preceded by: Francisco Dornelles

Second Vice President of the Federal Senate
- In office 1 February 2021 – 1 February 2023
- President: Rodrigo Pacheco
- Preceded by: Izalci Lucas
- Succeeded by: Rodrigo Cunha

Member of the Chamber of Deputies
- In office 1 February 2011 – 1 February 2015
- Constituency: Rio de Janeiro

Personal details
- Born: 29 January 1966 (age 60) Rio de Janeiro, Brazil
- Party: Independent (since 2026)
- Other political affiliations: PP (2001–2009); PSB (2009–2017); PODE (2017–2021); PL (2021–2026)
- Height: 1.67 m (5 ft 6 in)
- Spouses: Mônica Santoro (m. 1988; div. 1995) Danielle Favatto (m. 1996; div. 2001) Isabelle Bittencourt (m. 2002; div. 2014)
- Children: 7, including Romarinho
- Profession: Footballer, politician
Association football career
- Position: Striker
Youth career
- 1979–1980: Olaria
- 1981–1985: Vasco da Gama
Senior career*
Years	Team	Apps	(Gls)
1985–1988	Vasco da Gama	141	(80)
1988–1993	PSV Eindhoven	110	(98)
1993–1995	Barcelona	46	(34)
1995–1996	Flamengo	59	(60)
1996–1997	Valencia	11	(5)
1997	→ Flamengo (loan)	22	(21)
1998–1999	Flamengo	65	(34)
2000–2002	Vasco da Gama	73	(79)
2002–2004	Fluminense	73	(45)
2003	→ Al Sadd (loan)	3	(0)
2005–2006	Vasco da Gama	50	(35)
2006	Miami FC	25	(19)
2006	→ Adelaide United (loan)	4	(1)
2007	Vasco da Gama	15	(13)
2009	America-RJ	1	(0)
Total		698	(542)
International career
1985	Brazil U20	11	(11)
1988	Brazil U23	7	(8)
1987–2005	Brazil	70	(55 (Note: Some sources, including FIFA, credit Romário with an extra goal in a 3–2 win against Mexico in the 1997 Copa América while other sources give it as an own goal by Camilo Romero. It is not counted here.))
Managerial career
- 2007: Vasco da Gama (interim)
- 2008: Vasco da Gama
Medal record
Men's football
Representing Brazil
FIFA World Cup
Winner	1994 United States
FIFA Confederations Cup
Winner	1997 Saudi Arabia
Copa América
Winner	1989 Brazil
Winner	1997 Bolivia
Olympic Games
Silver medal – second place	1988 Seoul	Team
CONCACAF Gold Cup
Third place	1998 USA
South American U-20 Championship
Winner	1985 Paraguay
- * Club domestic league appearances and goals

Romário de Souza Faria (born 29 January 1966), known simply as Romário (Brazilian Portuguese: [ʁoˈmaɾiu]), is a Brazilian politician and former professional footballer who is currently the Senior Senator for Rio de Janeiro and the president of football club America-RJ. A prolific striker renowned for his clinical finishing, he is considered one of the greatest players of all time. He scored over 700 goals for his clubs and country and is one of only five players to have scored 100 goals with three different clubs. (Note: Other players include Isidro Lángara, Cristiano Ronaldo, Neymar, and Robert Lewandowski)

Romário starred for Brazil in their 1994 FIFA World Cup triumph, receiving the Golden Ball as player of the tournament. He was named FIFA World Player of the Year the same year. He came fifth in the FIFA Player of the Century internet poll in 1999, was elected to the FIFA World Cup Dream Team in 2002, and was named in the FIFA 100 list of the world's greatest living players in 2004.

At club level, after developing his early career in Brazil, Romário moved to PSV Eindhoven in the Netherlands in 1988. During his five seasons at PSV the club became Eredivisie champions three times, and he scored a total of 165 goals in 167 games. In 1993, he moved to Barcelona and became part of Johan Cruyff's "Dream Team", forming an exceptional strike partnership with Hristo Stoichkov. He won La Liga in his first season and finished as the top goalscorer with 30 goals in 33 matches. During the second half of his career Romário played for clubs within the city of Rio de Janeiro in Brazil. He won the Brazilian league title with Vasco da Gama in 2000 and was top scorer three times in the league. At the end of his career he also played briefly in Qatar, the United States and Australia.

Considered a master of the confined space of the penalty area, his rapid speed over short distances (aided by his low centre of gravity) took him away from defenders, and he was renowned for his trademark toe poke finish. With 55 goals in 70 appearances, Romário is the fourth-highest goalscorer for the Brazil national team, behind Neymar, Pelé and Ronaldo. He is third on the all-time list of the Brazilian league's top scorers with 155 goals. He is the ninth-highest goalscorer in the history of football with 784 goals in 1002 official games.

In addition, including selection teams, he has made over 1,000 appearances in his career.

Romário started his political career in 2010, when he was elected deputy for the Brazilian Socialist Party. He was then elected senator in 2014. In 2017, he switched parties for Podemos, and in 2021, he joined the Liberal Party.

== Club career ==
=== Early years ===
From humble origins, Romário was spotted in childhood when playing for Olaria, a small club from the Rio de Janeiro suburb. He was taken to the junior team of Vasco da Gama where he won two state league titles (1987, 1988) and earned his first call-ups to the national team. Romário came to international attention when he became the top scorer at the 1988 Olympic football tournament.

=== 1988–1993: PSV Eindhoven ===
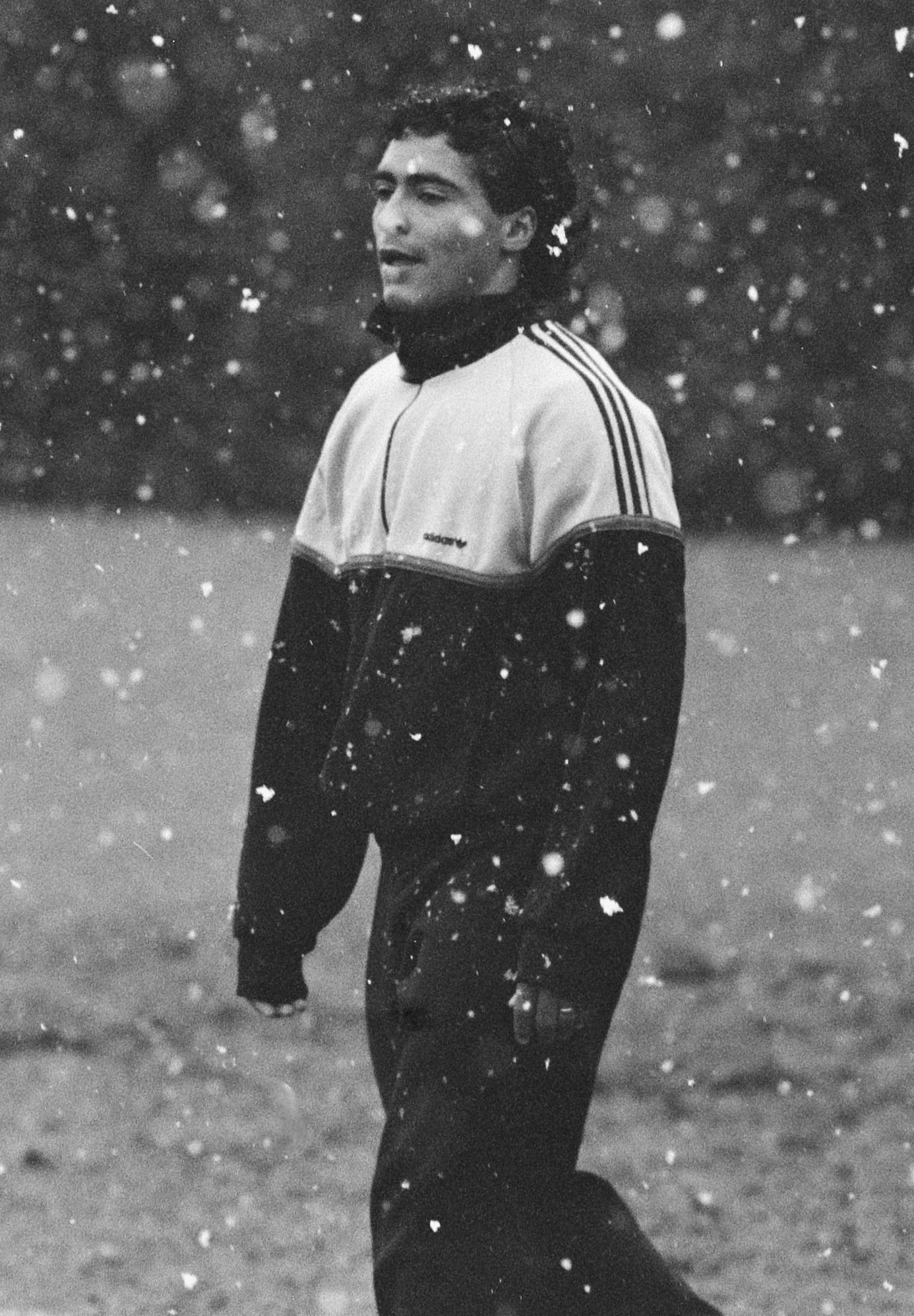
Romário training with PSV in February 1989

Shortly after the Olympics he moved to PSV Eindhoven, where he won the Eredivisie in 1989, 1991 and 1992. Renowned for his ability to operate in the confined space of the penalty box, Romário scored 165 goals in 167 games in five seasons at PSV.

Driven by an unswerving belief in his abilities, Romário's laid-back manner and overwhelming self-confidence would be displayed throughout his career, with Guus Hiddink, his coach at PSV, stating, "If he saw that I was a bit more nervous than usual ahead of a big game, he'd come to me and say: ‘Take it easy, coach, I'm going to score and we’re going to win'. What's incredible is that eight out of the ten times he told me that, he really did score and we really did win."

=== 1993–1995: Barcelona ===
Romário moved to Barcelona for the 1993–94 season and became part of Johan Cruyff's "Dream Team", in which, along with players such as strike partner Hristo Stoichkov, midfielders José Mari Bakero and Michael Laudrup, and prolific goalscoring defender Ronald Koeman, he helped the club win the La Liga title, while becoming the season's top goalscorer with 30 goals in 33 matches. Barcelona also reached the 1994 UEFA Champions League final, where in spite of being heavy favourites to win, they eventually lost 0–4 to Milan. The buildup to the final saw Spanish newspapers already declaring Barcelona as winners, while Cruyff told his team, "You're better than them; you're going to win". With Romário and Stoichkov leading the Barcelona attack, Milan defender Paolo Maldini conceded his team were underdogs, but they were spurred on by what they perceived as arrogance from Barcelona.

"It has to be Romário. You never knew what to expect with him. His technique was outstanding, and he scored goals from every possible position, most of them with his toe, funnily enough."

— Johan Cruyff when asked to name the greatest player he ever coached.

One of Romário's best performances was scoring a hat-trick in the memorable 5–0 win over Real Madrid in the El Clásico at the Camp Nou, with the spectacular opening goal seeing him drag the ball around the defender without it leaving his foot before finishing with a trademark toe-poke into the corner of the net. His highlight for Barcelona in the UEFA Champions League came in the two games against Manchester United where he nutmegged Peter Schmeichel to score at Old Trafford, and scored again in the 4–0 win at the Camp Nou in front of 114,000 fans. Reflecting on the game at the Camp Nou, Manchester United captain Steve Bruce, who played in defence that night, states: "Of all the great things that happened during my career, the thing that sticks out the most is that night because we got our backsides kicked big-style. Stoichkov and Romário are still etched in my memory, especially Romário, who was arguably the best player I ever faced."

Romário was named FIFA World Player of the Year in 1994, after being the runner-up in 1993. Although he was lauded for his performances, Romário was prone to controversy, and in 1994 he landed a left hook to Sevilla's Diego Simeone and was suspended for five games. Romário left Barcelona unexpectedly in January 1995 after having a rift with coach Cruyff.

=== 1995–1999: Flamengo and Valencia ===
"When I was born, the man in the sky pointed to me and said, ‘That's the guy’.

— Romário on his ability.

In 1995, Romário returned to Brazil to play for Flamengo and spent five years there excluding two short-lasting comebacks to Spain during that period. During a Supercopa Libertadores match against Argentine team (and reigning world champion) Club Atlético Vélez Sarsfield in 1995, Romário kicked an opposition defender on the chest in retaliation for a punch on his teammate Edmundo. He began the 1996–97 season with the Spanish club Valencia but after having heated arguments with then head coach Luis Aragonés he was soon loaned back to Flamengo. Romário returned to Valencia at the beginning of 1997–98 season. With their new coach Claudio Ranieri claiming that he did not want to have any players staying at the club against their will, Romário, stating his need for good preparation for the World Cup in France, left Valencia for good after playing just six league matches in the season; once again he returned to Flamengo.

=== 2000–2005: Vasco and Fluminense ===
Romário rejoined Vasco da Gama in 2000 and linked up again with fellow international striker Edmundo. Forming a prolific partnership, the two forwards led Vasco to the final of the 2000 FIFA Club World Championship, with Romário finishing as joint-top goalscorer with three goals. The most notable performance from the pair was a 3–1 defeat of European champions Manchester United at the Estádio do Maracanã, where Romário scored twice in three first-half minutes and Edmundo added a third before half time. Having previously got on well together at Flamengo, the volatile Edmundo became jealous of Romário's privileges, stating the club was "a court, Romário the prince and [club chairman] Eurico Mirando [sic] the king". After Vasco's victory a few days later, Romário replied: "Now the court is happy: the king, the prince and the fool [Edmundo]".

At 34 years of age, Romário had one of the best seasons in his career while winning the Copa Mercosur and the Brazilian league title with Vasco. Romário's performance was key in the Mercosur final where Vasco faced Brazilian rivals Palmeiras from São Paulo. After splitting the first two matches, a decisive third took place in São Paulo. Palmeiras took a 3–0 lead before half-time. In the second half however, Vasco scored four goals including Romário's winner in the stoppage time, which completed his hat-trick. Romário received both the South American and Brazilian Footballer of the Year awards. He finished both the 2000 and 2001 seasons as the Brazilian league's top goalscorer.

From 2002 until 2004, he played for Fluminense. In February 2003, Romário signed a lucrative three-month contract in Qatar with Al Sadd but after a disappointing stint without scoring a goal he returned to Fluminense. On 21 October 2004 he was fired from the club after a conflict with the coach. He also attacked a fan who had thrown six live chickens at him during training. Romário then went back once again to play for the team he started at, Vasco da Gama. In 2005, at 39 years of age, Romário scored 22 goals in the Brazilian Championship, making him the league's top goalscorer for the third time.

=== Later career ===
In the beginning of 2006 Romário joined Miami FC along with former 1994 FIFA World Cup teammate Zinho. He helped Miami FC reach their first ever USL-1 Playoffs, scoring 19 league goals in 25 appearances for the team.

Newly promoted Campeonato Mineiro side Tupi announced a short-term deal with Romário to play for the Juiz de Fora team in the Taça Minas. However, the Brazilian Football Confederation prohibited the transfer, claiming the contract was signed after the closing of the international transfer window. Romário did not make his debut for the club, but took part in practice sessions.

Seen as a publicity coup of the A-League's short history, Romário was signed by AUFC Board member Mel Patzwald to the Australian A-League club Adelaide United for a 5-game guest stint. He played his first match for Adelaide United on 25 November 2006 against the Central Coast Mariners. During his final game on 15 December 2006 he finally scored a goal for Adelaide to end what many considered to be a disappointing spell with the club. In January 2007 he signed a new deal with Vasco da Gama.

==== Thousandth goal ====
On 20 May 2007, Romário scored his 1000th goal, a penalty kick against Sport Recife, playing for Vasco da Gama. The Brazilian press claimed him as one of few players in professional football history to achieve this, like Pelé, Puskás, Friedenreich and Binder. The 1000th goal drew much attention from both Brazilian and international press, with the game being stopped for over 20 minutes to allow for celebrations from his fans. There is some controversy over the validity of the 1000 goals, because the number is somewhat inaccurate and Romário's research team also counted his goals in junior, friendly and non-official games.

FIFA congratulated Romário on his milestone goal but stated he is still officially on 929 goals, as 77 came in youth football, with others being scored in unofficial friendly matches. RSSSF estimated his career tally to be 968 goals in 1188 games. In 2008, Romário released a DVD with the best goals of his career totaling 900 goals in the disc. Following the landmark goal, Vasco da Gama unveiled a statue of Romário at the São Januário.

==== Player/Manager of Vasco da Gama ====
On 24 October 2007, it was announced that Romário would take charge of his first match as the interim manager of Vasco against Club América of Mexico in the return leg of their Copa Sudamericana quarter final and he would also participate on the field as a player. Romário, then 41 years of age, replaced Celso Roth as the manager of Vasco da Gama, and also played the match against Club América at the same time. Vasco da Gama president Eurico Miranda declared to Globo Online that Romário would be in charge of the team for the match, but it is likely to only be temporarily. On 6 February 2008 Romário objected to Miranda's intervention in team selection, so was dismissed, but remained contracted to Vasco as a player.

On 4 December 2007, Romário announced he had tested positive for finasteride (aka Propecia) after a match against Palmeiras on 28 October. He claims it was in an anti-baldness treatment; however, the drug was banned as it is a masking agent for anabolic steroids.

==== Retirement and comeback ====
On 5 February 2008, Romário announced his retirement both from playing and coaching, effective at the end of March. This move came somewhat unexpectedly, as fans anticipated that he would retire from playing, but not coaching. He made it clear that he will only concentrate on the FIFA Confederations Cup and helping with the 2014 FIFA World Cup. However, on 27 March, Romário denied that he had retired.

Romário announced on 15 April 2008 at his DVD launch that he would retire from the game of football. He cited his weight as a major factor in his decision to retire from the game. Romário played for many clubs that spanned across five continents for over two decades. He scored 71 goals in 85 appearances for Brazil (including appearances and goals in the Olympics) and claimed to have scored over 1,000 club goals. Romário officially announced his retirement from playing, saying:

Officially I'm not playing any more. I've stopped. My time is up. Everything has been a lot of fun.

In August 2009, Romário announced that he would come out of retirement to play for America from Rio de Janeiro. He stated that he would play for the club to fulfill his late father's wishes. On 25 November 2009, Romário made his comeback. He came on during the 68th minute of the match between America and Artsul, replacing Adriano. Although he did not score, America won 2–0, which helped the club to win the Carioca Championship Second Division title.

In 2024, aged 58, Romário came out of retirement for a second time and was registered as a player-president for America in the 2024 Campeonato Carioca Série A2 to play alongside his son Romarinho. He was an unused substitute in the 2–0 win against Petrópolis in the first round and stated that the initial plan is to be available only for the home matches.

== International career ==
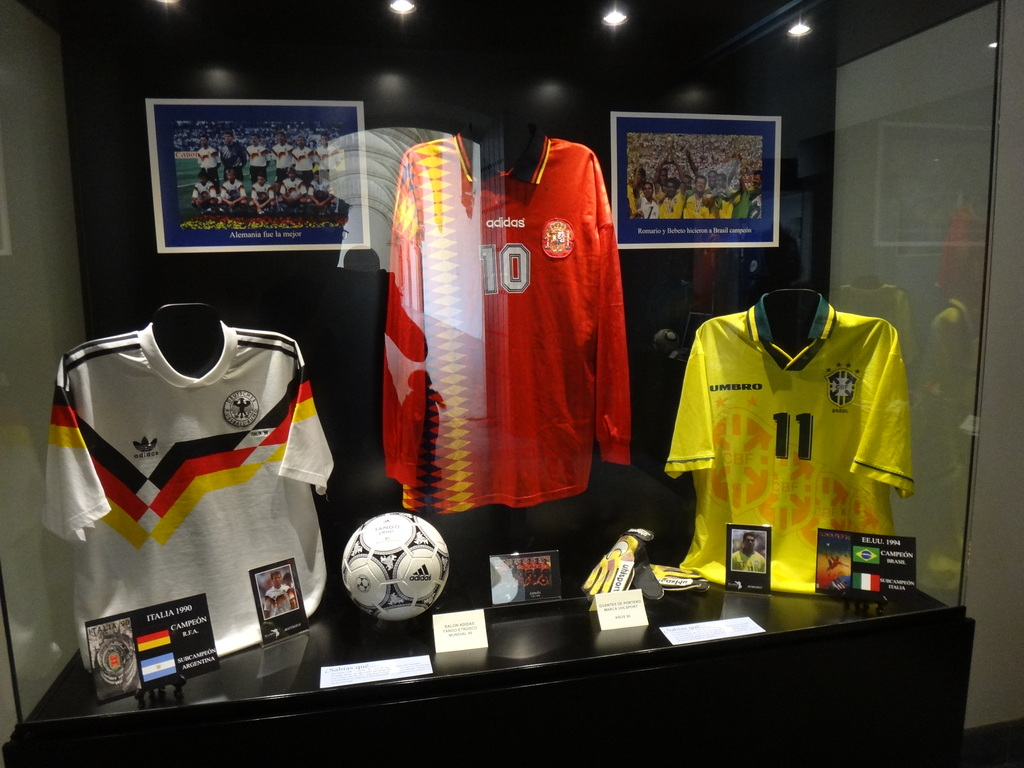
Romário's No.11 Brazil shirt

As a member of the Brazil national team, Romário won the silver Olympic medal in Seoul in 1988, finishing as the top-goalscorer with seven goals in six matches. He attained the status of national hero at the 1989 Copa América as he scored the only goal in the final against Uruguay to end Brazil's long trophy drought in front of their own fans at the Maracanã. He was part of the Brazilian squad in the World Cups of 1990 and 1994. He scored 71 goals in 85 international matches (including senior and Olympic teams), being the fourth-highest goalscorer in the history of the Brazilian team.

=== 1990 World Cup ===
Romário was one of the most talked about stars leading up to the 1990 World Cup in Italy, but picked up a serious injury (broken fibula) three months before the big kick-off. Despite doing everything to recover in time and being rewarded with a spot in the squad, his lack of fitness meant he was restricted to playing only 66 minutes in one match, against Scotland. Brazil were eliminated in round of 16 by their rival side Argentina.

=== 1994 World Cup ===
In 1992, during Romário's successful season at PSV Eindhoven, he was called up to the national team for a friendly match against Germany on 16 December 1992 in Porto Alegre – Rio Grande do Sul, Brazil. Coach Carlos Alberto Parreira left Romário as a reserve, after which he expressed his dissatisfaction, saying he would not have come over from Netherlands if he had known he was not going to play. These declarations caused Parreira to ban Romário from the Brazilian team.

Brazil played the first seven matches of the 1994 World Cup qualification without Romário, and suffered their first loss ever in World Cup qualifying against Bolivia. His exclusion provoked a wave of outrage, with journalists and fans calling for his return to the team. Brazil had to beat or tie against Uruguay at the Maracanã Stadium to finish first of their group. Before the match against Uruguay, Parreira gave up and called Romário. Back in his beloved number 11 jersey, prior to the game Romário stated: "I already know what is going to happen: I'm going to finish Uruguay". Brazil won 2–0, with Romário scoring both goals, and qualified for the World Cup. Parreira commented afterwards: "God sent Romário to the Maracanã".

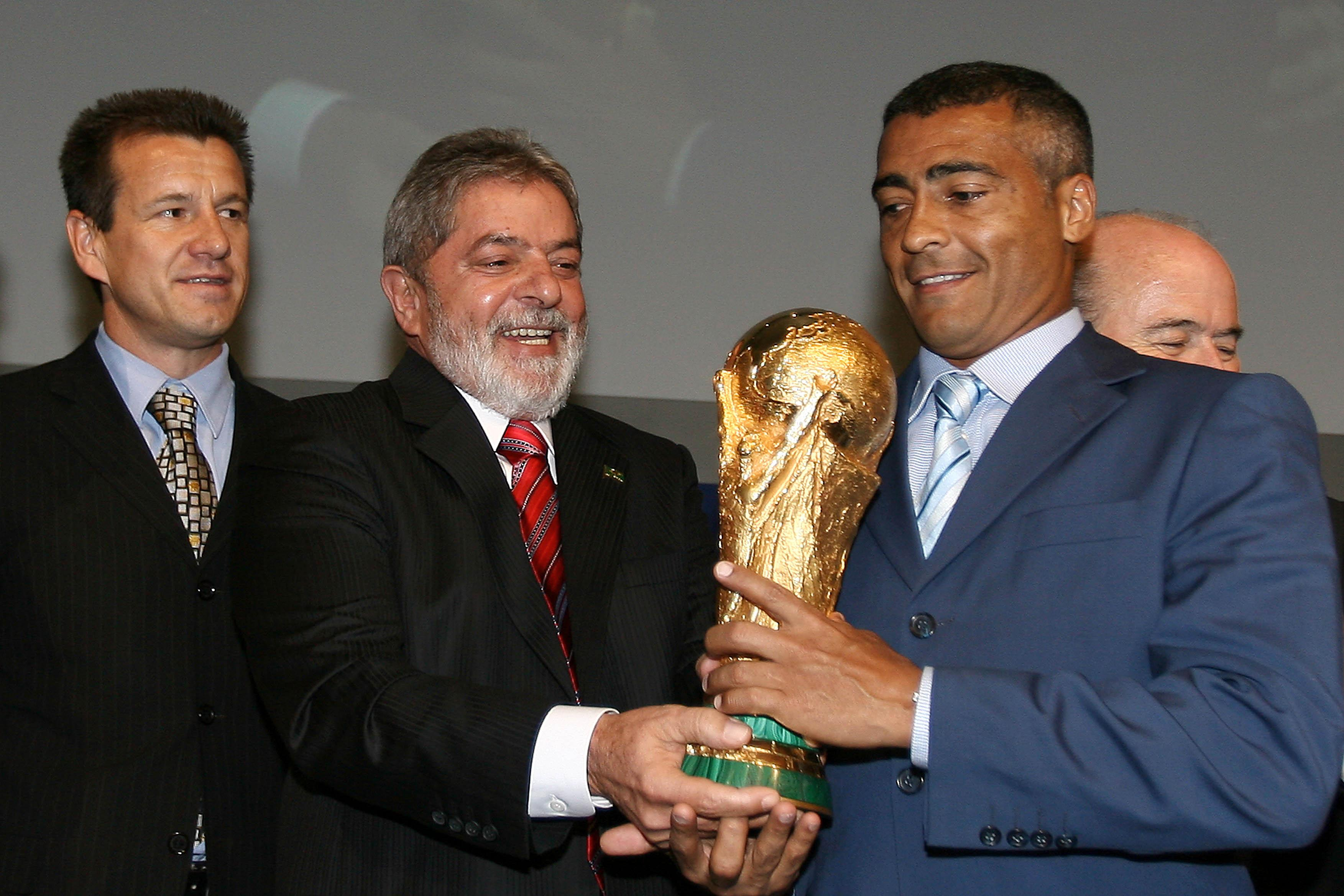
Romário and his 1994 teammate Dunga (far left) with Brazil president Lula and the World Cup trophy

At the 1994 World Cup held in the United States, Romário partnered Bebeto in attack to lead his country to a record fourth World Cup title. Romário scored five goals in the tournament: one in each of the three first round matches, against Russia, Cameroon, and a trademark toe-poke finish against Sweden. He scored one against the Netherlands in the quarterfinals; and the game-winning header against Sweden in the semifinals.

"They are both skillful players, outstanding players. They are matadors, killers inside the penalty area."

— Brazil coach at USA '94 Carlos Alberto Parreira on Romário and Bebeto.

Romário also assisted Bebeto in the only goal of the match against the United States in San Francisco for the round of 16 elimination match. Although he did not get on the scoresheet in the final in Los Angeles against Italy, a game played in searing heat which ended as a goalless draw, he converted Brazil's second penalty in the shoot-out, which ended in a 3–2 win for Brazil. Romário won the World Cup Golden Ball as the most valuable player of the tournament, and was named in the World Cup All-Star Team.

Described by Jere Longman of The New York Times as "short on humility, long on talent", Romário demanded a window seat on the team plane and refused to sit next to Bebeto. He did however join Bebeto in one of the most iconic images of the tournament. After Bebeto scored against the Netherlands in Dallas, his goal celebration generated headlines around the world when he began rocking an imaginary baby – his wife had given birth to their third child just days before – with Romário (and Mazinho) then joining Bebeto in the rocking motion.

=== The Ro-Ro attack ===
In the subsequent years, Romário formed, along with the younger Ronaldo, a feared attacking combo, which was colloquially referred to as the Ro-Ro duo. The first title which the strikers won while playing together in the front line, was the 1997 Copa América in Bolivia where they scored a total of eight goals. Later on in December 1997 they each scored a hat-trick in a 6–0 win against Australia in the 1997 FIFA Confederations Cup final. Romário finished the tournament as the top goalscorer with seven goals while Ronaldo added four. In 1997 alone, the duo scored an impressive total of 34 international goals with 19 coming from Romário. The Ro-Ro attack was expected to headline the upcoming World Cup in France.

=== 1998 and 2002 World Cup absence ===
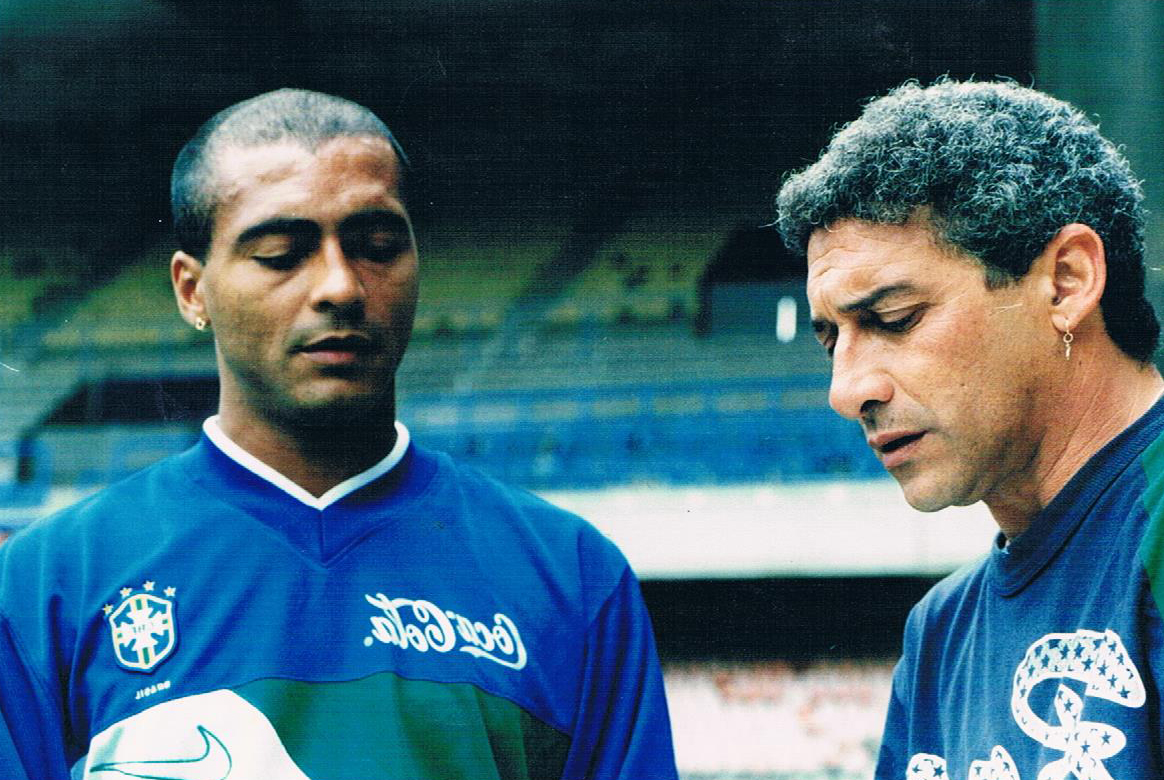
Romário (left) in training with Brazil

Romário was left out of the 1998 World Cup squad. Medical exams had revealed that he had a muscular injury, and he received intensive treatment leading up to the tournament, but he did not recover completely and was dismissed the day of the deadline for the World Cup squad submissions. Just after the decision was announced, Romário held a press conference where he broke down in tears while saying that "this is very sad for me, a big disappointment. This is a very difficult moment in my life". With a forward line of Ronaldo and Bebeto, Brazil reached the World Cup final but lost to hosts France.

Prior to the 2002 World Cup, Romário, aged 36, was in considerably good form while playing for Vasco da Gama, but once again he was left out of the national squad by coach Luiz Felipe Scolari due to indiscipline. The final incident happened when he pulled out of the Brazil squad for the 2001 Copa América in Colombia. He told Scolari that he was having an eye operation, but played friendlies for club side Vasco da Gama in Mexico and went on holiday instead. Romário gave a televised news conference in which he made his case and apologised, bursting into tears three times, though he said he could not remember doing or saying anything against the manager and the players. The BBC's South American football correspondent, Tim Vickery, called Romário's news conference "bizarre" and reported that there were "increasingly credible rumours" that "senior players asked Scolari not to recall the veteran striker". Scolari was unmoved and did not pick him, saying before his squad announcement that Romário's exclusion was "technical and tactical". After the announcement, he said that it was as a result of Romário's withdrawing from the Copa América: "People forget the details, but I do not. I almost got fired from the national team after [the Copa América]." (Brazil had been beaten in the quarter-finals by Honduras.) Without Romário, Brazil went on to win the World Cup for the fifth time.

=== Last game for Brazil ===
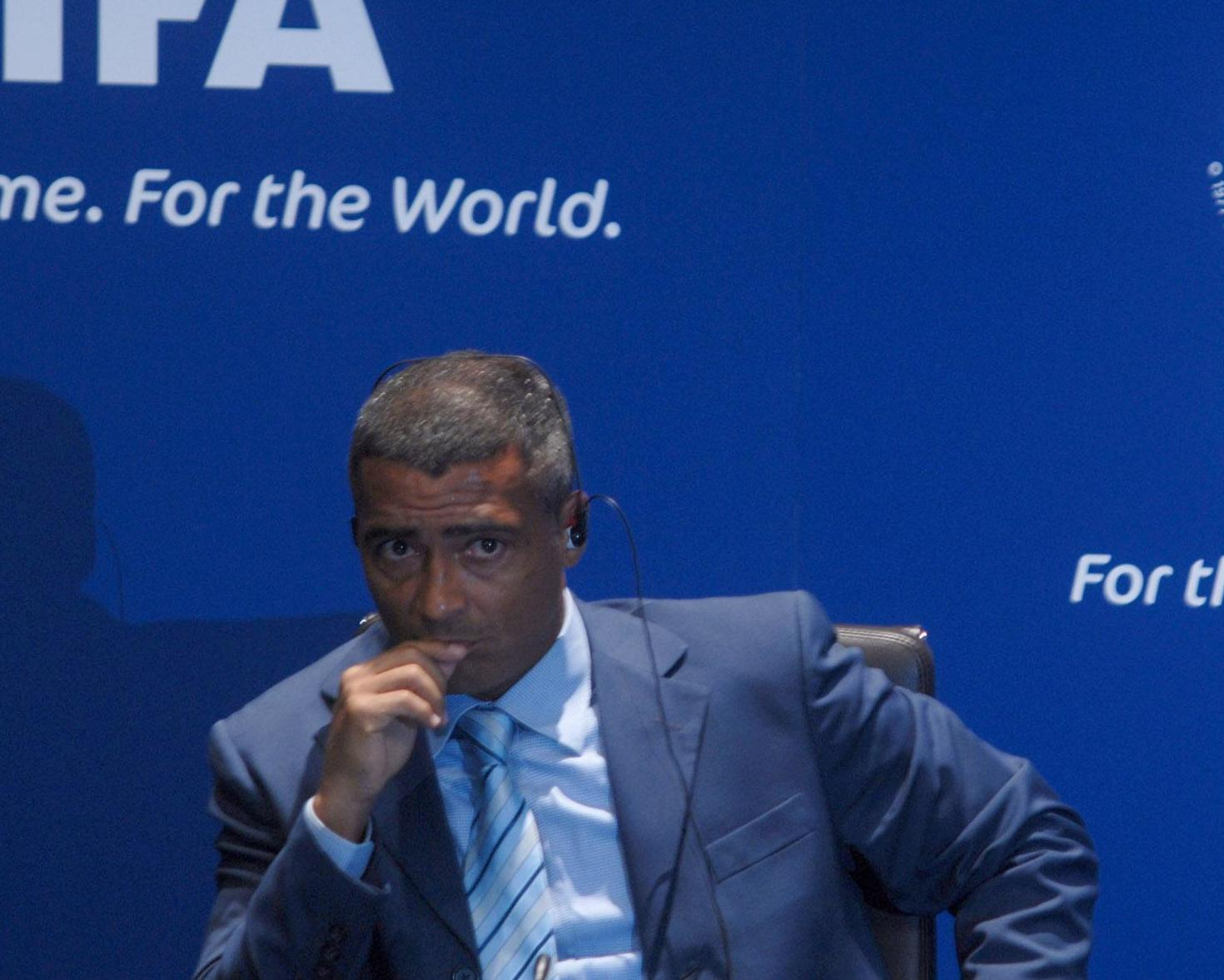
Romário at FIFA headquarters in Zurich, Switzerland in 2007 at the announcement of Brazil being named hosts of the 2014 FIFA World Cup

On 27 April 2005, Romário played his last game with the Brazil national team in a friendly and celebratory match in São Paulo. He wore the captain's armband and scored the second goal in Brazil's 3–0 win against Guatemala. Following the end of his playing career with Brazil, Romário successfully campaigned for Brazil to be awarded host status for the 2014 FIFA World Cup.

== Footvolley and beach soccer ==
Since the 1990s Romário has been a footvolley enthusiast, playing with friends in various tournaments. In 2006, he won the VIP Footvolley.net Open in Miami Beach, USA; and was runner-up in the 2011 Footvolley World Championship in Rio de Janeiro. He also plays beach soccer and represented Brazil at the 2005 FIFA Beach Soccer World Cup.

== Style of play and recognition ==
"We're talking of one of the great centre-forwards. He's a master of the reduced space of the penalty area. A square metre for him is like an acre. Why? Low centre of gravity, powerful thighs so he can explode, wonderful finishing ability. Both because he's very proficient technically, but also because he's so cold in front of goal."

— Tim Vickery, BBC football correspondent, on Romário.

Romário is regarded as one of the greatest and most prolific strikers of all time. His coach at Barcelona, Johan Cruyff, defined him as a "genius of the goal area", as well as the greatest player he ever coached. His Brazilian compatriot Ronaldo, who played with him in his early career, reflected, "Romário was the most decisive player who I played with, he was a great goal scorer, finisher, skillful, opportunist. I think I learnt all of that from him". Italian playmaker Roberto Baggio said "Romário is one of the greatest players of all time. He is a master of art in the penalty area," a view echoed by Paolo Maldini with, "Romário was incredible in the penalty area." Diego Maradona on who was the best player he ever saw play, "It is between Romário and Van Basten". Romário wore the number 11 shirt for most of his club and international career, which inspired Neymar's number at Santos (he also went on to wear number 11 for Barcelona).

Along with two other FIFA World Player of the Year recipients, Brazilian compatriot Ronaldo and Liberian star George Weah, Romário was seen as a new breed of striker in the 1990s who would also operate outside the penalty area before running with the ball towards goal, with former France striker Thierry Henry stating: "Ronaldo, together with Romário and George Weah, reinvented the centre-forward position. They were the first to drop from the penalty box to pick up the ball in midfield, switch to the flanks, attract and disorientate the central defenders with their runs, their accelerations, their dribbling." Nicknamed Baixinho (Portuguese for "The Little One," or "Shorty") Romário was an extremely agile player, who possessed excellent balance on the ball, and significant strength in spite of his small stature, which made him particularly effective in tight spaces in the penalty area, and allowed him to retain possession of the ball when put under pressure by larger players; his low centre of gravity and quick bursts of acceleration enabled him to outrun opponents over short distances and beat defenders with sudden turns or changes of pace, while his technique and finishing ability saw him score a wide variety of numerous goals, including goals from powerful and accurate first-time strikes – notably through his trademark toe-pokes with little back-lift – or even from chipped shots. His ball control and dribbling skills saw him use elaborate feints, such as: dragging the ball around a defender without it leaving his foot, and the flip flap.

While he could operate outside the penalty area in making runs from deep, Romário built a reputation as an extremely opportunistic "goal-poacher" inside the penalty area. He was known for his intelligence, offensive movement, and positional sense, as well as his ability to find space in the area and lose his markers by making late runs. In addition to his goalscoring, he was also known for his speed, as well as his creativity and vision, which gave him the ability to link up with and provide assists for teammates. This enabled him to form many notable attacking partnerships with other prolific, technically gifted forwards, such as Stoichkov (at Barcelona), Edmundo (at Vasco da Gama), Euller (Vasco da Gama) and Bebeto and Ronaldo (with Brazil). In spite of his talent, however, Romário was also criticised for being too outspoken, and for his poor work rate throughout his career, in particular for his vocal dislike of training. Regarding his work-rate and lifestyle off the pitch, Rodrigo Orihuela of The Guardian stated in 2007: "Romário has never been much of a committed athlete and has always had a rather laissez-faire approach to training. 'The night was always my friend. When I go out, I am happy and when I am happy I score goals', he once summarised."

== Media and sponsorship ==
Romário has appeared in commercials for the sportswear company Nike. In 1998, he starred in a Nike commercial set in an airport with a number of stars from the Brazil national team, including Ronaldo and Roberto Carlos. Romário features in EA Sports' FIFA video game series; he was included in the FIFA 14 Ultimate Team Legends.

== Political career ==
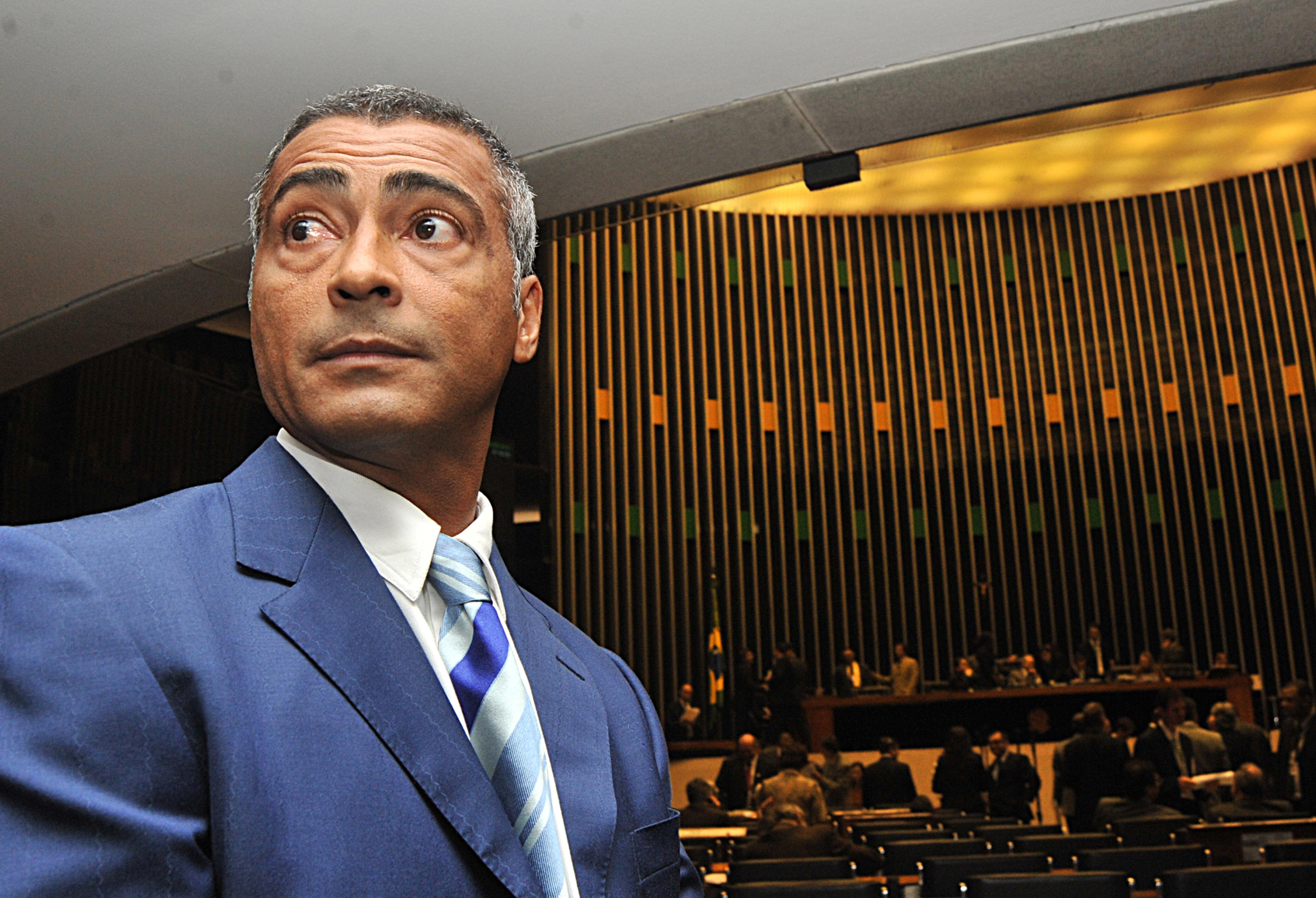
Romário in the Chamber of Deputies of Brazil on 6 May 2010

In the 2010 general election, Romário was elected to the Chamber of Deputies on the Brazilian Socialist Party ticket. He was the sixth most voted candidate for deputy in Rio de Janeiro.

He pushed his political agenda against the 2014 FIFA World Cup in Brazil, denouncing the event as immersed in corruption and money laundering. He also expressed disagreement with Ricardo Teixeira, Jérôme Valcke, and Sepp Blatter. He is one of various figures claiming that the holding of the 2018 FIFA World Cup was "stolen" from England and sold to Russia as part of the 2011 scandal involving FIFA.

On 19 February 2014, Romário announced that he would run for the Brazilian senate in the 2014 general election, and the decision was officially confirmed in June. On 5 October, Romário was elected to the Senate with the most votes received ever by a candidate representing the state of Rio de Janeiro.

In June 2017, Romário left the PSB and joined Podemos, becoming president of the party in the State of Rio de Janeiro. In March 2018, Romário announced his run for governor of Rio de Janeiro in the Brazilian general election as a candidate for the centrist Podemos party. Romário finished in fourth place, with 8.6% of valid votes.

In April 2021, Romário switched parties again, to the Liberal Party. In October, he publicly endorsed the President of Brazil, Jair Bolsonaro, and criticised the previous administration of Luiz Inácio Lula da Silva.

== Personal life ==
Romário has been married and divorced three times and has seven children, including Romarinho, who is a footballer who also played for Vasco da Gama.

== Career statistics ==
=== Club ===
Appearances and goals by club, season and competition
Season	Club	League			State league		Cup		Continental		Other (Note: Includes UEFA Super Cup (1988), Intercontinental Cup (1988), Dutch Super Cup (1991, 1992), Supercopa de España (1993), FIFA Club World Cup (2000).)		Total	
Season	Club	Division	Apps	Goals	Apps	Goals	Apps	Goals	Apps	Goals	Apps	Goals	Apps	Goals
Vasco da Gama	1985	Série A	7	0	21	11	—		0	0	—		28	11
Vasco da Gama	1986	Série A	23	9	25	20	—		—		—		48	29
Vasco da Gama	1987	Série A	17	8	24	16	—		—		—		41	24
Vasco da Gama	1988	Série A	0	0	24	16	—		—		—		24	16
Vasco da Gama	Total		47	17	94	63	—		—		—		141	80
PSV	1988–89	Eredivisie	24	19	—		5	4	2	2	3	1	34	26
PSV	1989–90	Eredivisie	20	23	—		3	2	4	6	—		27	31
PSV	1990–91	Eredivisie	25	25	—		3	5	2	0	—		30	30
PSV	1991–92	Eredivisie	15	9	—		1	0	2	0	1	0	19	9
PSV	1992–93	Eredivisie	26	22	—		3	3	9	7	1	0	39	32
PSV	Total		110	98	—		15	14	19	15	5	1	149	128
Barcelona	1993–94	La Liga	33	30	—		2	0	10	2	2	0	47	32
Barcelona	1994–95	La Liga	13	4	—		0	0	5	3	—		18	7
Barcelona	Total		46	34	—		2	0	15	5	2	0	65	39
Flamengo	1995	Série A	16	8	21	26	5	1	4	2	—		46	37
Flamengo	1996	Série A	3	0	19	26	5	1	0	0	6	4	33	31
Flamengo	Total		19	8	40	52	10	2	4	2	6	4	79	68
Valencia	1996–97	La Liga	5	4	—		0	0	0	0	—		5	4
Valencia	1997–98	La Liga	6	1	—		1	1	—		—		7	2
Valencia	Total		11	5	—		1	1	0	0	—		12	6
Flamengo	1997	Série A	4	3	18	18	8	7	0	0	6	7	36	35
Flamengo	1998	Série A	20	14	11	10	4	6	3	4	2	1	40	35
Flamengo	1999	Série A	19	12	15	16	7	7	7	8	6	3	54	46
Flamengo	Total		43	29	44	44	19	20	10	12	14	11	130	116
Vasco da Gama	2000	Série A	28	20	17	19	2	1	14	14	10	12	71	66
Vasco da Gama	2001	Série A	18	21	6	11	0	0	9	5	6	3	39	40
Vasco da Gama	2002	Série A	0	0	4	8	7	5	—		14	13	25	26
Vasco da Gama	Total		46	41	27	38	9	6	18	16	35	31	135	132
Fluminense	2002	Série A	26	16	0	0	0	0	—		—		26	16
Fluminense	2003	Série A	21	13	4	5	0	0	0	0	—		25	18
Fluminense	2004	Série A	13	5	9	6	2	2	—		—		24	13
Fluminense	Total		60	34	13	11	2	2	—		—		75	47
Al-Sadd (loan)	2002–03	Qatar Stars League	3	0	—		0	0	—		—		3	0
Vasco da Gama	2005	Série A	30	22	10	7	3	1	—		—		43	30
Vasco da Gama	2006	Série A	0	0	10	6	1	3	0	0	—		11	9
Vasco da Gama	Total		30	22	20	13	4	4	—		—		54	39
Miami FC	2006	USL 1st	25	19	—		1	0	—		—		26	19
Adelaide United	2006–07	A-League	4	1	—		—		0	0	—		4	1
Vasco da Gama	2007	Série A	6	3	9	10	3	2	1	0	—		19	15
America-RJ	2009	Carioca Série B	—		1	0	—		—		—		1	0
Career total			450	311	248	231	66	51	67	50	62	47	893	690

=== International ===
Appearances and goals by national team and year
National team	Year	Apps	Goals
Brazil	1987	6	4
Brazil	1988	7	2
Brazil	1989	11	4
Brazil	1990	1	0
Brazil	1991	0	0
Brazil	1992	2	0
Brazil	1993	1	2
Brazil	1994	10	10
Brazil	1995	0	0
Brazil	1996	0	0
Brazil	1997	17	19
Brazil	1998	7	3
Brazil	1999	0	0
Brazil	2000	2	7
Brazil	2001	5	3
Brazil	2002	0	0
Brazil	2003	0	0
Brazil	2004	0	0
Brazil	2005	1	1
Total		70	55

==== List of international goals scored by Romário ====
Scores and results list Brazil's goal tally first, score column indicates score after each Romário goal.

No.	Date	Venue	Opponent	Score	Result	Competition	Ref.
1	28 May 1987	Helsinki Olympic Stadium, Helsinki, Finland	Finland	1–1	3–2	Friendly	
2	1 June 1987	Ramat Gan Stadium, Ramat Gan, Israel	Israel	1–0	4–0	Friendly	
3	1 June 1987	Ramat Gan Stadium, Ramat Gan, Israel	Israel	3–0	4–0	Friendly	
4	28 June 1987	Estadio Olímpico Chateau Carreras, Córdoba, Argentina	Venezuela	5–0	5–0	1987 Copa América	
5	7 July 1988	Olympic Park Stadium, Melbourne, Australia	Australia	1–0	1–0	Australia Bicentenary Gold Cup	
6	17 July 1988	Sydney Football Stadium, Sydney, Australia	Australia	1–0	2–0	Australia Bicentenary Gold Cup	
7	12 July 1989	Estádio do Maracanã, Rio de Janeiro, Brazil	Argentina	2–0	2–0	1989 Copa América	
8	14 July 1989	Estádio do Maracanã, Rio de Janeiro, Brazil	Paraguay	3–0	3–0	1989 Copa América	
9	16 July 1989	Estádio do Maracanã, Rio de Janeiro, Brazil	Uruguay	1–0	1–0	1989 Copa América	
10	30 July 1989	Estadio Brígido Iriarte, Caracas, Venezuela	Venezuela	2–0	4–0	1990 World Cup qualifier	
11	19 September 1993	Estádio do Maracanã, Rio de Janeiro, Brazil	Uruguay	1–0	2–0	1994 World Cup qualifier	
12	19 September 1993	Estádio do Maracanã, Rio de Janeiro, Brazil	Uruguay	2–0	2–0	1994 World Cup qualifier	
13	5 June 1994	Commonwealth Stadium, Edmonton, Canada	Canada	1–0	1–1	Friendly	
14	8 June 1994	Jack Murphy Stadium, San Diego, United States	Honduras	1–0	8–2	Friendly	
15	8 June 1994	Jack Murphy Stadium, San Diego, United States	Honduras	2–0	8–2	Friendly	
16	8 June 1994	Jack Murphy Stadium, San Diego, United States	Honduras	5–1	8–2	Friendly	
17	12 June 1994	Bulldog Stadium, Fresno, United States	El Salvador	1–0	4–0	Friendly	
18	20 June 1994	Stanford Stadium, Stanford, United States	Russia	1–0	2–0	1994 FIFA World Cup	
19	24 June 1994	Stanford Stadium, Stanford, United States	Cameroon	1–0	3–0	1994 FIFA World Cup	
20	28 June 1994	Pontiac Silverdome, Pontiac, United States	Sweden	1–1	1–1	1994 FIFA World Cup	
21	9 July 1994	Cotton Bowl, Dallas, United States	Netherlands	1–0	3–2	1994 FIFA World Cup	
22	13 July 1994	Rose Bowl, Pasadena, United States	Sweden	1–0	1–0	1994 FIFA World Cup	
23	2 April 1997	Estádio Nacional Mané Garrincha, Brasília, Brazil	Chile	1–0	4–0	Friendly	
24	2 April 1997	Estádio Nacional Mané Garrincha, Brasília, Brazil	Chile	3–0	4–0	Friendly	
25	30 April 1997	Orange Bowl, Miami, United States	Mexico	2–0	4–0	Friendly	
26	30 April 1997	Orange Bowl, Miami, United States	Mexico	3–0	4–0	Friendly	
27	30 April 1997	Orange Bowl, Miami, United States	Mexico	4–0	4–0	Friendly	
28	31 May 1997	Ullevaal Stadion, Oslo, Norway	Norway	1–1	2–4	Friendly	
29	8 June 1997	Stade de Gerland, Lyon, France	Italy	3–3	3–3	Tournoi de France	
30	10 June 1997	Parc des Princes, Paris, France	England	1–0	1–0	Tournoi de France	
31	13 June 1997	Estadio Ramón Aguilera, Santa Cruz, Bolivia	Costa Rica	5–0	5–0	1997 Copa América	
32	26 June 1997	Estadio Ramón Aguilera, Santa Cruz, Bolivia	Peru	3–0	7–0	1997 Copa América	
33	26 June 1997	Estadio Ramón Aguilera, Santa Cruz, Bolivia	Peru	5–0	7–0	1997 Copa América	
34	7 December 1997	Ellis Park Stadium, Johannesburg, South Africa	South Africa	1–0	2–1	Friendly	
35	12 December 1997	King Fahd II Stadium, Riyadh, Saudi Arabia	Saudi Arabia	2–0	3–0	1997 FIFA Confederations Cup	
36	12 December 1997	King Fahd II Stadium, Riyadh, Saudi Arabia	Saudi Arabia	3–0	3–0	1997 FIFA Confederations Cup	
37	16 December 1997	King Fahd II Stadium, Riyadh, Saudi Arabia	Mexico	1–0	3–2	1997 FIFA Confederations Cup	
38	19 December 1997	King Fahd II Stadium, Riyadh, Saudi Arabia	Czech Republic	1–0	2–0	1997 FIFA Confederations Cup	
39	21 December 1997	King Fahd II Stadium, Riyadh, Saudi Arabia	Australia	3–0	6–0	1997 FIFA Confederations Cup	
40	21 December 1997	King Fahd II Stadium, Riyadh, Saudi Arabia	Australia	4–0	6–0	1997 FIFA Confederations Cup	
41	21 December 1997	King Fahd II Stadium, Riyadh, Saudi Arabia	Australia	6–0	6–0	1997 FIFA Confederations Cup	
42	5 February 1998	Orange Bowl, Miami, United States	Guatemala	1–1	1–1	1998 CONCACAF Gold Cup	
43	8 February 1998	Los Angeles Memorial Coliseum, Los Angeles, United States	El Salvador	2–0	4–0	1998 CONCACAF Gold Cup	
44	15 February 1998	Los Angeles Memorial Coliseum, Los Angeles, United States	Jamaica	1–0	1–0	1998 CONCACAF Gold Cup	
45	3 September 2000	Estádio do Maracanã, Rio de Janeiro, Brazil	Bolivia	1–0	5–0	2002 FIFA World Cup qualification	
46	3 September 2000	Estádio do Maracanã, Rio de Janeiro, Brazil	Bolivia	3–0	5–0	2002 FIFA World Cup qualification	
47	3 September 2000	Estádio do Maracanã, Rio de Janeiro, Brazil	Bolivia	4–0	5–0	2002 FIFA World Cup qualification	
48	8 October 2000	Estadio José Pachencho Romero, Maracaibo, Venezuela	Venezuela	3–0	6–0	2002 FIFA World Cup qualification	
49	8 October 2000	Estadio José Pachencho Romero, Maracaibo, Venezuela	Venezuela	4–0	6–0	2002 FIFA World Cup qualification	
50	8 October 2000	Estadio José Pachencho Romero, Maracaibo, Venezuela	Venezuela	5–0	6–0	2002 FIFA World Cup qualification	
51	8 October 2000	Estadio José Pachencho Romero, Maracaibo, Venezuela	Venezuela	6–0	6–0	2002 FIFA World Cup qualification	
52	7 March 2001	Estadio Jalisco, Guadalajara, Mexico	Mexico	2–2	3–3	Friendly	
53	7 March 2001	Estadio Jalisco, Guadalajara, Mexico	Mexico	3–3	3–3	Friendly	
54	25 April 2001	Estádio do Morumbi, São Paulo, Brazil	Peru	1–1	1–1	2002 World Cup qualifier	
55	27 April 2005	Estádio do Pacaembu, São Paulo, Brazil	Guatemala	2–0	3–0	Friendly	

== Honours ==
Vasco da Gama

- Campeonato Brasileiro Série A: 2000
- Campeonato Carioca: 1987, 1988
- Copa Mercosur: 2000
- FIFA Club World Cup runner-up: 2000

PSV Eindhoven

- Eredivisie: 1988–89, 1990–91, 1991–92
- KNVB Cup: 1988–89, 1989–90
- Dutch Super Cup: 1992

Barcelona

- La Liga: 1993–94
- Supercopa de España: 1994
- UEFA Champions League runner-up: 1993–94

Flamengo

- Campeonato Carioca: 1996, 1999
- Copa Mercosur: 1999

Al-Sadd

- Qatar Crown Prince Cup: 2003

América-RJ

- Campeonato Carioca Second Division: 2009

Brazil Youth

- U-20 South American Championship: 1985
- Summer Olympic Silver Medal: 1988

Brazil

- FIFA World Cup: 1994
- Copa América: 1989, 1997
- FIFA Confederations Cup: 1997

Individual

- South American Youth Football Championship top scorer: 1985
- Campeonato Carioca top scorer: 1986, 1987, 1996, 1997, 1998, 1999, 2000
- Vasco da Gama Player of the Year: 1987, 1988, 2000, 2001
- Summer Olympics top scorer: 1988
- Eredivisie top scorer: 1988–89, 1989–90, 1990–91
- KNVB Cup top scorer: 1988–89, 1989–90
- Dutch Footballer of the Year: 1989
- European Cup/UEFA Champions League top scorer: 1989–90, 1992–93
- Onze de Bronze: 1993
- Pichichi Trophy: 1993–94
- Trofeo EFE: 1993–94
- FIFA World Cup Golden Ball: 1994
- FIFA World Cup Bronze Boot: 1994
- FIFA World Cup All-Star Team: 1994
- Onze d'Or: 1994
- FIFA World Player of the Year: 1994; silver award: 1993
- L'Équipe Champion of Champions: 1994
- South American Team of the Year: 1995, 2000, 2001
- FIFA Confederations Cup Golden Shoe: 1997
- FIFA Confederations Cup Silver Ball: 1997
- Torneio Rio-São Paulo top scorer: 1997, 2000
- CONCACAF Gold Cup All-Star Team: 1998
- Copa do Brasil top scorer: 1998, 1999
- Copa Mercosur top scorer: 1999, 2000
- Placar Golden Boot: 1999, 2000, 2002
- Campeonato Brasileiro Série A top scorer: 2000, 2001, 2005
- FIFA Club World Cup Bronze Ball: 2000
- Bola de Ouro: 2000
- Bola de Prata: 2000, 2001, 2005
- South American Footballer of the Year: 2000
- CBF Golden Boot: 2001, 2005
- FIFA World Cup Dream Team: 2002
- FIFA 100: 2004
- Rei do Gol Trophy: 2005
- USL First Division Most Valuable Player: 2006
- USL First Division top scorer: 2006
- Prêmio Craque do Brasileirão Special Honour: 2007
- Golden Foot Legends Award: 2007
- International Football Hall of Fame: 2014
- Marca World Cup All-Time Team: 2014
- Brazilian Football Museum Hall of Fame
- Ballon d'Or – Le nouveau palmarès: 1994
- Globe Soccer Awards Player Career Award: 2022

== See also ==
- List of men's footballers with 500 or more goals
- List of FIFA World Cup top goalscorers
- List of men's footballers with 50 or more international goals

== Notes ==
Federal Senate
Preceded by Izalci Lucas	Second Vice President of the Federal Senate; 2021–present	Incumbent
