= Bita (footballer) =

Brazilian footballer

Personal information
- Full name: Silvio Lasso Lassalvia
- Date of birth: 11 August 1942
- Place of birth: Recife, Brazil
- Date of death: 27 October 1992 (aged 50)
- Place of death: Recife, Brazil
- Position: Forward

Youth career
- 1958–1962: Náutico

Senior career*
Years	Team	Apps	(Gls)
1962–1966	Náutico		
1967	Nacional (URU)		
1967–1968	Náutico		
1969–1972	Santa Cruz		
- * Club domestic league appearances and goals as of 21 October 2024

Silvio Lasso Lassalvia (11 August 1942 – 27 October 1992), better known as Bita, was a Brazilian professional footballer who played as a forward.

== Career ==
Revealed by Náutico in 1962, Bita is considered the main player in the club's history, where he was six times state champion, top scorer three times in the Taça Brasil, and scoring 223 goals in 319 matches for the club. He had a quick spell at Nacional in 1967, and played for Santa Cruz from 1969 to 1972, being state champion in all these years again.

Bita received the nickname "The Rifleman", and was compared to Pelé and Ademir da Guia as one of the main players in Brazilian football in the 1960s. Despite this, he never played for the Brazilian team.

== Personal life ==
Son of Italian Tommaso Lasalvia, Bita is the brother of midfielder Nado, with whom he played together at Náutico and later played for Vasco da Gama.

== Honours ==
Náutico

- Campeonato Pernambucano: 1963, 1964, 1965, 1966, 1967, 1968
- Copa dos Campeões do Norte: 1966

Santa Cruz

- Campeonato Pernambucano: 1969, 1970, 1971, 1972

Individual

- Taça Brasil top scorer: 1966
- Campeonato Pernambucano top scorer: 1964, 1965, 1966
- Prêmio Belfort Duarte: 1972
