= Clube Náutico Capibaribe =

Brazilian association football club based in Recife, Pernambuco, Brazil

Náutico
- Full name: Clube Náutico Capibaribe
- Nicknames: Timbu (White-eared opossum); Timbu Coroado (King Timbu); Alvirrubro (The Red & White); Hexacampeão (6-Time Champion); A Mais Fiel do Nordeste (The Northeast's Most Loyal)
- Founded: 7 April 1901; 125 years ago
- Ground: Aflitos
- Capacity: 22,856
- President: Bruno Becker
- Head coach: Bruno Pivetti
- League: Campeonato Brasileiro Série B (2026); Pernambucano; Copa do Nordeste
- 2025: Série C, 3rd of 20 (2nd on quadrangular)
- Website: nautico-pe.com.br
Home colors	Away colors	Third colors

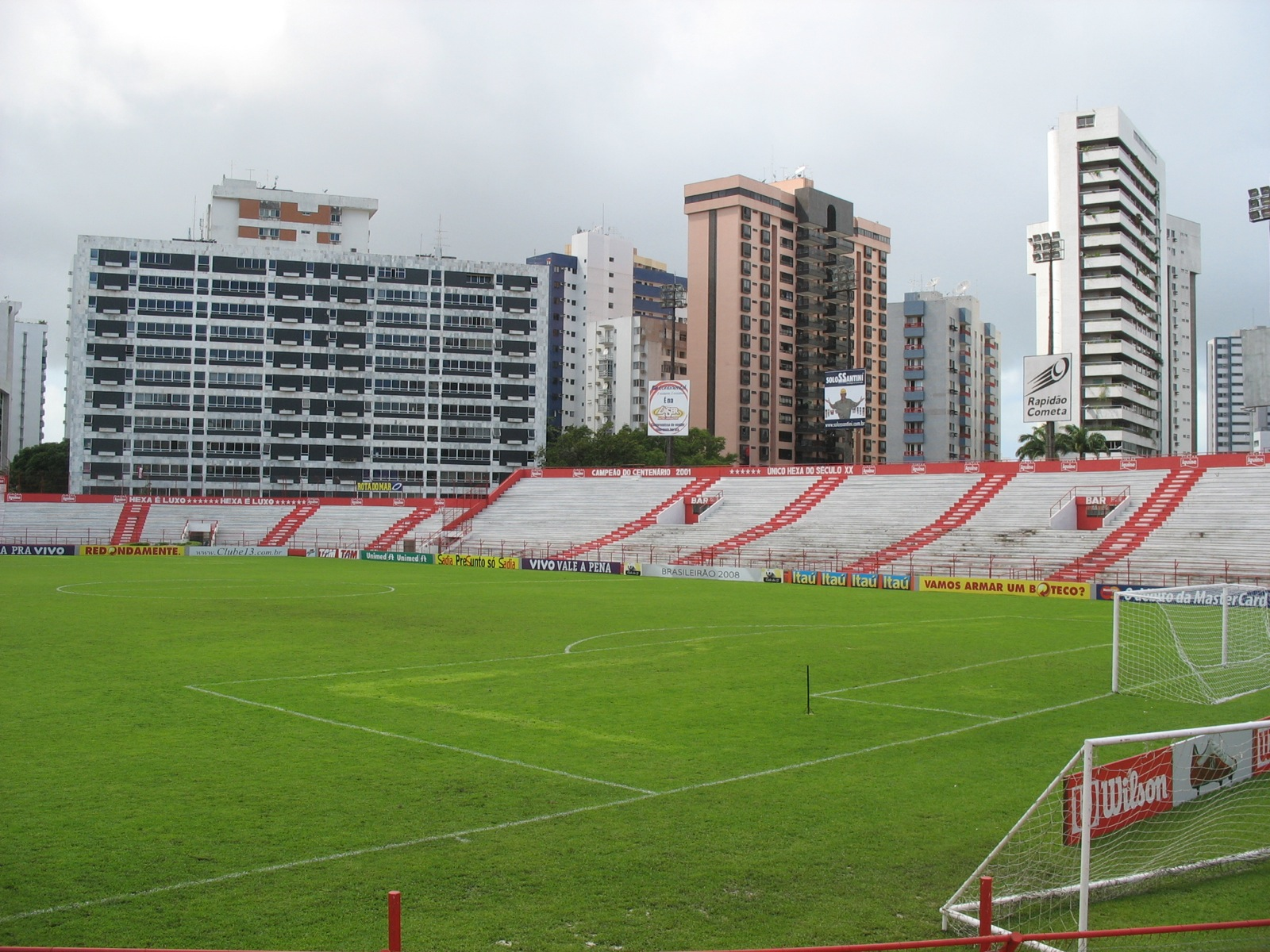
Estádio dos Aflitos

Logo from 1995 to 2008

Clube Náutico Capibaribe (Portuguese pronunciation: [ˈklubi ˈnawtʃiku kɐpibɐˈɾibi]), or simply Náutico, is a Brazilian multi-sport club based in Recife, Pernambuco. The club is most notable for its association football team, that plays in the Série B, the second tier of the Brazilian football league system, as well as in the Campeonato Pernambucano, the top division in the Pernambucano state football league system.

The origins of Náutico may be traced to the foundation of the Clube Náutico do Recife by a group of rowers ("Náutico" can be directly translated to "nautical") in 1898, but the official founding date is 7 April 1901. Its first football team dates back to 1905, with a squad formed by Englishmen and Germans.

Náutico is the only football club in Pernambuco that has won the state championship 6 times in a row (from 1963 to 1968). The club has a historical rivalry with local clubs Sport Recife and Santa Cruz. In Pernambuco, it was the first club to achieve regional and national prominence, and today, at the state level, it is the club with the most members, according to public information available on its official website. It is recognized as the most prominent club from the Northeast region in regional and national competitions during the 1960s, being, moreover, the club from the region that reached the most Brazilian Championship semifinals in that decade. Since then, it has been regarded as one of the "giants" of Northeastern Brazil football, a title still used today by its fans and in advertising campaigns and media.

Náutico has an important swimming arena, including an Olympic-sized pool that meets all world standards. It also has activities in other sports including hockey, basketball, volleyball, handball, women's football, futsal, Brazilian jiu-jitsu, Boxing, Taekwondo, kendo, Muay Thai, MMA and the founding sport of the club, rowing. The official mascot of Náutico is the opossum, known locally as the "timbu".

Náutico has the 6th-largest core of fans in the Northeastern region of Brazil, and occupies the 21st place in the overall Brazilian ranking. In total, there were approximately 1.5 million Náutico fans in 2010, as showed by a Lance magazine and IBOPE research.

== History ==
=== Foundation ===
Although the official founding date is 7 April 1901, the Clube Náutico Capibaribe had already been mentioned in the previous century, when two rival groups of rowers from Recife united. At the beginning, in 1897, a group of rowing enthusiasts led by the Portuguese João Victor da Cruz Alfarra rented boats from the old Lingueta, embarking on small excursions to the old Casa de Banhos in Pina. These trips extended as far as the neighborhood of Apipucos.

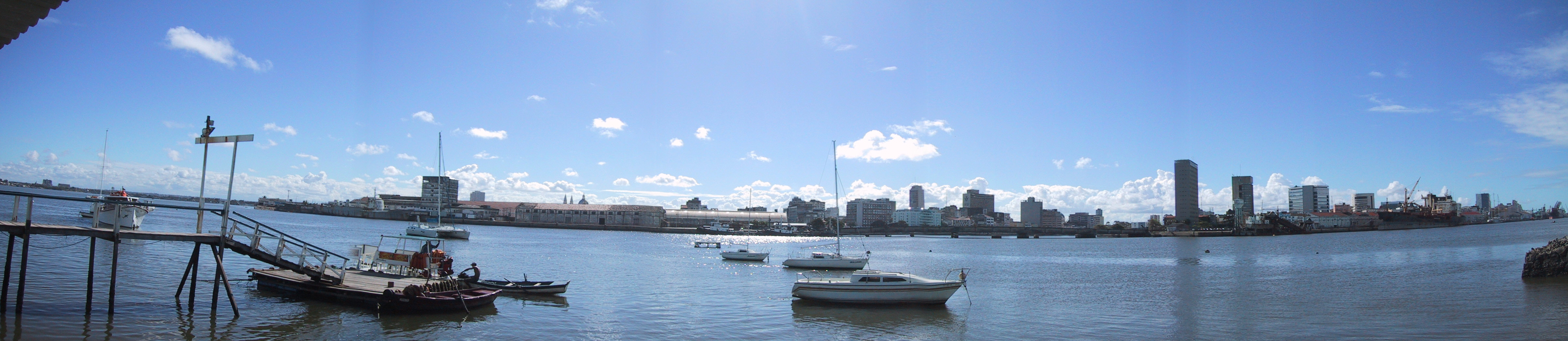
Panorama of the Capibaribe River from the location of the old Casa de Banhos, a site linked to Náutico's origins.

After the Canudos Revolt ended, Recife prepared to welcome the Pernambuco troops led by General Artur Costa. An extensive program was organized for the soldiers' reception, and João Alfarra, along with some fellow rowers from the Capibaribe River, was tasked with organizing the nautical portion of the reception. A major regatta was scheduled for 21 November 1897.

This competition piqued the interest of the people of Recife, who felt the need to host more events of this kind. At the time, rowing was already a national sport and began to gain new followers. The following year, employees of warehouses on Duque de Caxias and Rangel streets formed an association named the Clube dos Pimpões. Members of the other group, which had excelled in the Canudos troops' reception regatta, were inspired, and a series of races between the two groups took place in 1898 at the Casa de Banhos.

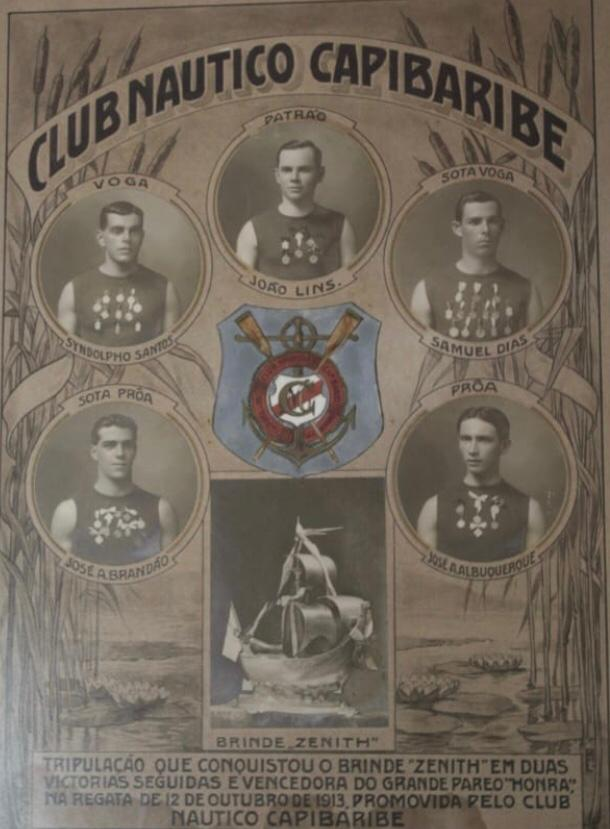
Image of Náutico's victory in a regatta in 1913. Note the blue in Náutico's crest, still used today in the numbering on striped uniforms.

By the end of 1898, it was agreed to establish another society that would unite the two aforementioned groups: the Club Náutico do Recife. In 1899, its leaders decided to reorganize the club while maintaining a commitment to nautical sports. At that time, the club's name was changed to Recreio Fluvial, but the new name was not well received. As a result, in early 1901, the name by which the club is officially recognized today was decided: Clube Náutico Capibaribe

On 7 April 1901, João Alfarra called on all those connected to rowing to attend a ceremony in which the first meeting minutes of the club would be written and recorded—a date that would be officially recognized as the club's founding.

"On the seventh of April, nineteen hundred and one—1901—on the first floor, number one of the Pernambuco Company Wharf, by invitation of Mr. João Victor da Cruz Alfarra, the same and Messrs. Antonio Dias Ferreira, Esmeraldo Gusmão Wanderley, A. Ommundsen, Oswaldo de Barros Lins e Silva, Francisco Joaquim Ferreira, João Vieira de Magalhães, and Francisco Leandro Rocha attended. Mr. Antonio Dias Ferreira was acclaimed chairman of the meeting, took the chair, and declared the session open, appointing Mr. Piragibe Haghissé as First Secretary, Mr. Francisco Joaquim Ferreira as Second Secretary, and Mr. João Vieira Magalhães as Treasurer. Mr. João Alfarra, requesting the floor, explained the purpose of the meeting, which is the founding of a society for nautical activities under the name Clube Náutico Capibaribe. This idea was approved by all […] the society's flag will have ten panels: the top and bottom red, the middle white with the letters C N C (the club's initials) in blue. This will also serve as the distinctive flag for the club's boats and members, displayed on the bow of the vessels as a small red jack with a white circle in the center containing a blue anchor and the club's initials […]"

The historical document was signed by all present —Antonio Dias Ferreira, the meeting's chairman; Piragibe Haghissé, the secretary; and João Victor da Cruz Alfarra, the group leader and the originator of the idea. The first flag featured red, white, and blue, which is why Náutico still uses blue for the numbers on its jerseys today. Náutico's first uniform was blue and white to reflect its nautical roots, which served as the foundation of the club. However, red soon replaced blue and joined white, as red was already featured in the club's flag.

== Stadium ==
=== Estádio dos Aflitos ===
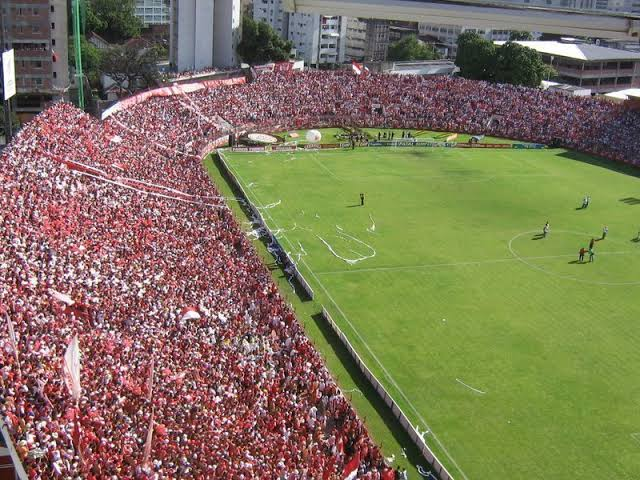
Nautico fans at a match against Flamengo for the Copa Sudamericana in Estadio dos Aflitos, 2009.

The Estádio Eládio de Barros Carvalho, popularly known as the Estádio dos Aflitos due to its location in the Aflitos neighborhood, is the stadium used by Clube Náutico Capibaribe. Opened on 25 June 1939, the name honors Eládio de Barros Carvalho, the club's president for 14 terms. Náutico stopped using the stadium between June 2013 and December 2018, as they began holding games at Arena Pernambuco.

However, the partnership with Arena Pernambuco did not work out. The Odebrecht conglomerate (now known as Novonor), which managed the arena, failed to meet contractual obligations with Náutico, particularly in financial transfers, leading to a domino effect that resulted in poor on-field performances. During this period, there was also a loss of identity due to moving to the "new home," which was over 15 km away from Aflitos and had limited public transportation access. All these factors led Náutico to file a lawsuit to terminate the contract unilaterally and demand millions in unpaid transfers, marking the end of the partnership.

In 2017, after strong support and mobilization by the alvirrubra fan base, extensive renovations began at Estádio dos Aflitos. A new field was laid, the old wire fence was replaced with glass, and the old seats were replaced with more modern ones. Structural upgrades included new emergency exits, improvements to the stadium's internal and external areas, new accommodations for players, fans, and the press, and improved lighting. However, capacity was reduced following an inspection by the Fire Department due to areas still needing renovations, especially with the addition of the new glass fence.

In December 2018, the stadium was reopened with a friendly match against Newell's Old Boys from Argentina. Náutico won the game by a score of 1–0, with the goal scored by the 17-year-old Thiago. Hours before the friendly with the Argentine team, another friendly match was held in the stadium as a tribute to forward Kuki, with the presence of former Náutico idols such as Geraldo, Beto Acosta, Netinho, Nilson, Nivaldo, Nildo, Batata, Muricy Ramalho, and Thiago Tubarão, among others.

• 1st game (25 June 1939): Náutico 5–2 Sport • 1st goal (25 June 1939): Wilson (Náutico) • Highest attendance (16 August 1970): Náutico 1–0 Santa Cruz (31,061 people) • Largest victory (1 July 1945): Náutico 21–3 Flamengo do Recife • Highest revenue (18 December 2018): R$1,576,220 – Náutico vs. Newell's Old Boys • Capacity: 22,856

== Club Culture ==
=== Supporters ===
The Náutico fan base exceeds 1 million supporters nationwide and abroad, particularly in neighboring northeastern states like Paraíba, Rio Grande do Norte, Ceará, Maranhão, and Alagoas.

The 2010 LANCE IBOPE survey, with a margin of error of only 1.1%, identified approximately 1 million Náutico fans in Brazil, with 885,432 in the Northeast Region and 765,234 in Pernambuco, with high representation among those with higher education.

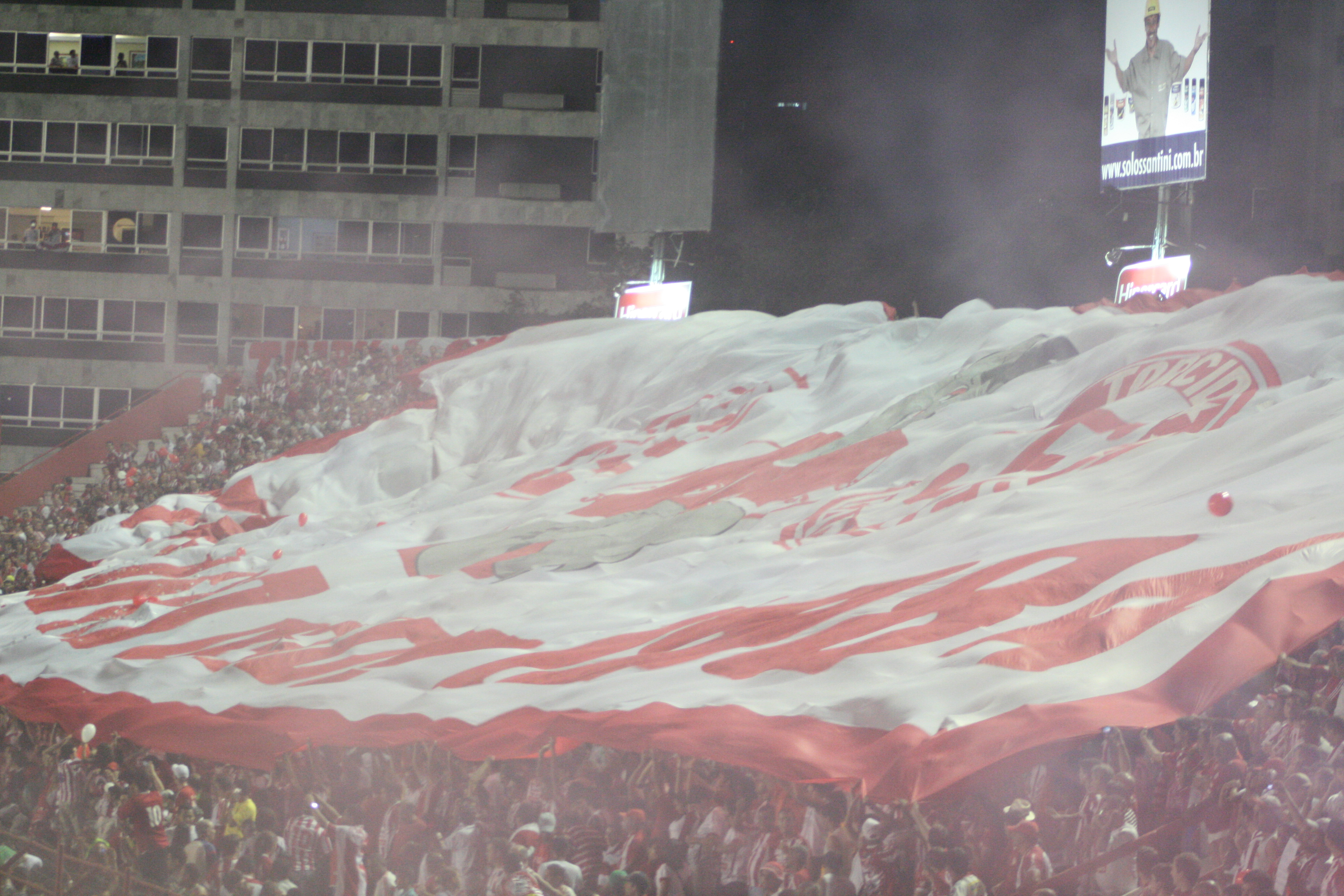
Náutico fans at the Aflitos stadium during the Náutico x Grêmio match in the Brazilian Championship Series A, 2009.

The 2013 PLURI CONSULTORIA survey, with an error margin of just 0.68%—the lowest in such surveys—identified 1.2 million Náutico fans in Brazil, ranking it as the 18th largest fan base in Brazil and the fifth largest in the Northeast.

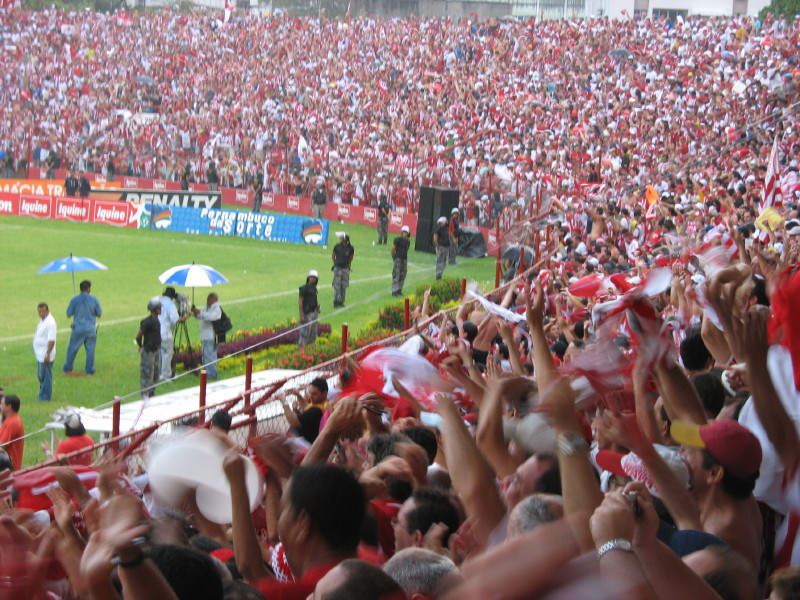
Supporters of Clube Náutico Capibaribe during match for Brazilian Championship Series B, 2006

One proof of the importance of the fan base for the team is the 85% home match success rate in the 2006 Campeonato Brasileiro Série B—the best performance among the 20 teams—with 16 wins, two draws, and only one loss in the 19 home games, drawing an average of around 10,000 fans per match in that championship. This number rose to about 13,000 in the first division of the 2007 Campeonato Brasileiro Série A. By 2009, Náutico had sold a total of 3,083,152 tickets for home games in first-division championships, ranking among the top 20 clubs in Brazil in ticket sales history.

It was among Náutico fans that one of Brazil's first barras was formed, called "Alma Alvirrubra", or "White-and-red soul". "Alma Alvirrubra" emerged during one of the most challenging times in the club's history, right after a loss in the last game of 2005, establishing it as a fan group born from hardship rather than fleeting enthusiasm.

In 2011, playing alongside their fans at Aflitos, Náutico achieved another record: they were the only club nationwide, across all divisions, not to lose a single home game in the Brazilian Championship. With 13 wins and 6 draws, the strong support of the alvirrubra fans was evident once again.

Its main organized fan group, the Torcida Jovem Fanáutico, is the oldest in Pernambuco, having been founded in 1984.

In 2020, a survey by the IBOPE highlighted fan loyalty in Brazil, with Náutico fans standing out as The Most Loyal in the Northeast at 73%, closely aligning with the major clubs in the country and far ahead of others. This is in contrast to other Northeast fan bases, which, like those in the North and Central-West regions, often include "mixed" fans (those who support both a local club and a larger club from the Southeast, or only one club from another region).

=== Rivalries ===
==== Clássico dos Clássicos (The Derby of the Derbies) ====
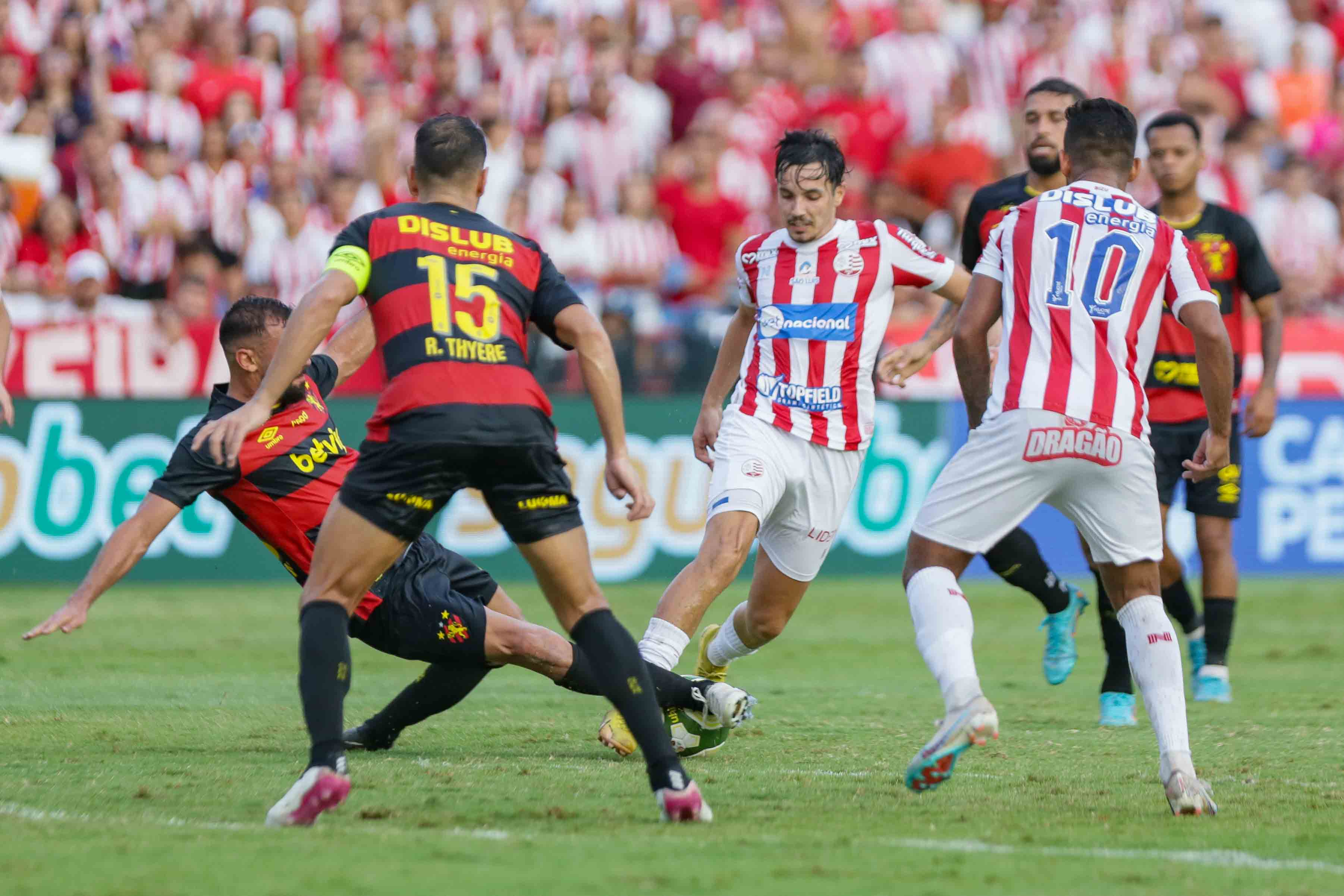
Nautico x Sport, c. 2024

Náutico's greatest rivalry is with Sport Recife, and their derbies are known as the Clássico dos Clássicos ("The Derby of the Derbies", in Portuguese). Náutico competes with Sport in the oldest and most traditional derby of the North-Northeast region, being the third oldest in Brazil and also the one with the greatest rivalry and balance in Pernambuco: the Clássico dos Clássicos, also known as the Derby Pernambucano and once referred to by the national press as the Northeast Classic,(In the mid-20th century, the BA-VI derby had not yet been consolidated as the biggest rivalry in Bahia.)

The first great classic of the Northeast was also once called the Fla-Flu of the Northeast by the national press due to its relevance in the early second half of the 20th century. The first match between the two teams took place on 25 July 1909, the same year in which the Alvirrubro team took its first steps on the field, facing its first opponents, marking the first-ever victory for Náutico.

==== Clássico das Emoções (The Derby of the emotions) ====
Náutico's other local rival is Santa Cruz (1918). The rivalry between the two clubs is known as the Clássico das Emoções ("The Derby of the Emotions"). The first Derby took place on 29 June 1917, with Santa Cruz winning 3-0 in a charity tournament match held at the "Campo dos Aflitos," which at the time belonged to the Liga Sportiva Pernambucana, now the FPF. This field would later become the Estádio dos Aflitos.

The 100th Pernambucan Championship also marked the 500th edition of this clássico, with Santa Cruz winning 5-3. In 1974, Santa Cruz attempted to win their sixth consecutive title but was stopped by Náutico, who became the Pernambucano champion. Náutico maintained their distinction as the only six-time consecutive champion of the tournament after defeating Santa Cruz in both matches of the final.

Despite being very traditional and having a rich history, the Clássico das Emoções has a lesser rivalry compared to the matches between Santa Cruz Futebol Clube and Sport Club do Recife, according to a fan opinion survey among Santa Cruz supporters. The same is said by Náutico fans, who prefer a classic matchup with Sport, as they have a greater rivalry with the rubro-negro team.

=== Timbu Coroado (Crowned Timbu) ===
Timbu Coroado is a traditional Brazilian Carnival block from Recife, founded in 1944, making it the first carnival bloco created by a football club in Pernambuco. An initiative of Clube Náutico Capibaribe, the bloco reflects the strong cultural identity of Pernambuco, blending rhythms such as frevo and maracatu and becoming one of the most traditional in Recife's carnival. Currently, it parades on Carnival Sunday through the streets of the Aflitos neighborhood, where Náutico's social headquarters, the Palacete, is located.

The bloco is known for its irreverence and celebration of popular traditions, with its anthem composed by Nelson Ferreira, one of Pernambuco's musicians. The name "Timbu Coroado" is a reference to the white-eared opossum known in Pernambuco as Timbu, Náutico's mascot and club symbol. Náutico was the first football club in Pernambuco to create its own carnival bloco, strengthening its influence on local culture.

Timbu Coroado is an extension of Náutico's history, bringing together fans and revelers in a celebration of Pernambuco's roots.

== National ranking ==
- Position: 38th
- Pontuation: 3.635 points

Every year CBF publish the Brazilian National Ranking on December. This ranking only includes National tournaments (it excludes State, Regional, and International tournaments) between 1959 and 2023 (since 2012, it has only accounted for the last 5 seasons).

== Sponsors ==
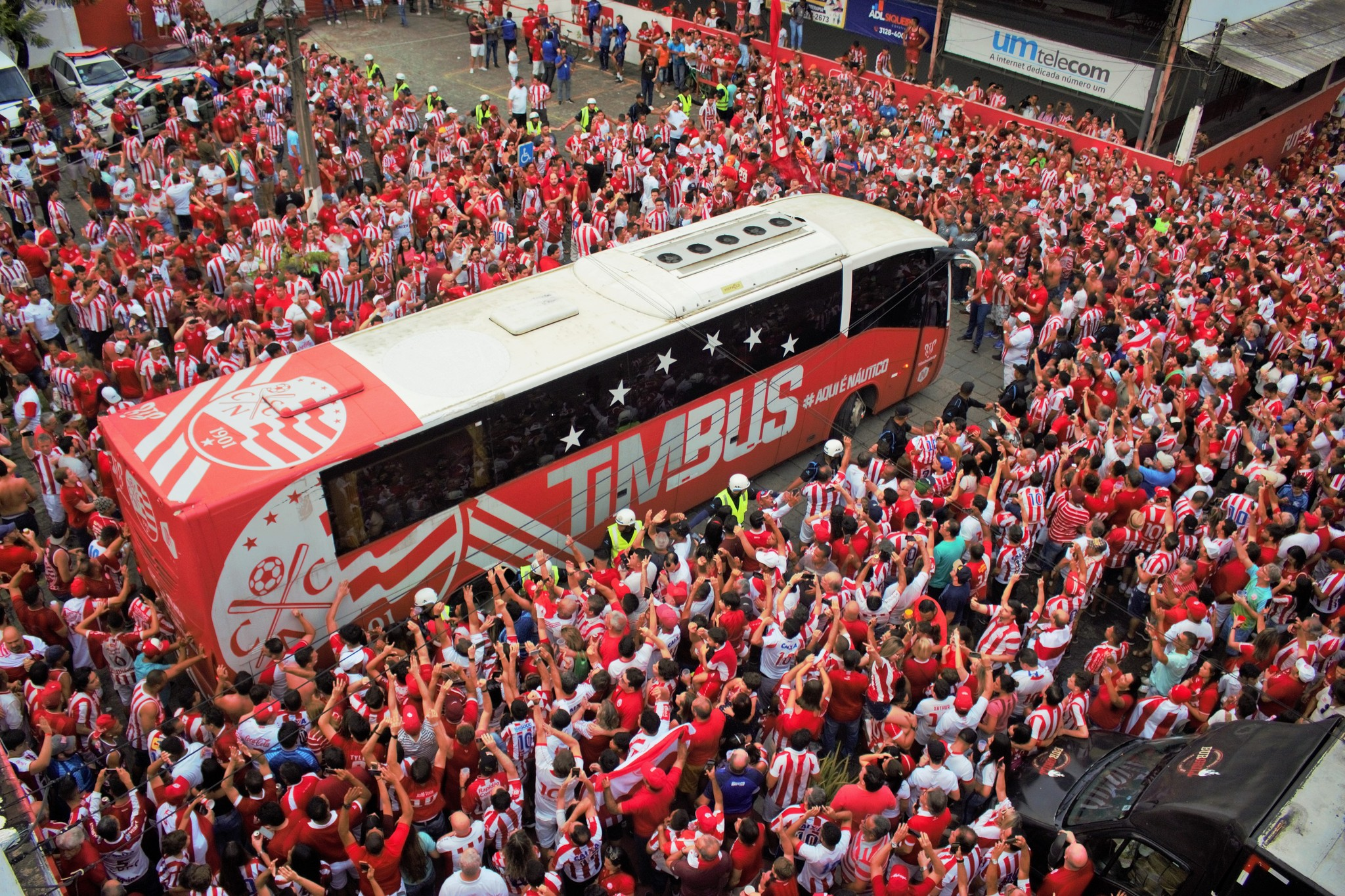
Náutico's bus, decorated with red and white colours

=== Main sponsor and kit suppliers ===
The main sponsor of Náutico is Esportes da Sorte, a Brazilian sports betting company with whom it has partnered since May 2024 and whose logo is featured prominently on the team's jersey. On March 19, 2026, Náutico renewed its partnership with Esportes da Sorte as the main sponsor, formalizing a two-year contract and sold its naming rights to its main sponsor, the betting company Esportes da Sorte. The traditional Eládio de Barros Carvalho Stadium (Aflitos) is now officially be called Estádio Esportes da Sorte Aflitos. The agreement, valued at R$ 12.5 million, is the largest in the club's history, focused on investments in football and improvements to the infrastructure, such as a new electronic scoreboard.

The production of sportswear by specialized manufacturers began at Náutico in 1980, with Adidas becoming the first company responsible for producing the club's kits. Most of the companies that have manufactured shirts for Timbu have been Brazilian, although American and English companies have also produced kits for the club.

Seeking exclusively to further boost merchandise sales, the club invested in its own brand in 2019, founding NSeis (N6). Initially, the project was considered successful; however, criticism regarding the quality of the shirts meant that the in-house brand never became unanimously popular among supporters, leading the club to change manufacturers during the period.

In 2024, Náutico partnered with Diadora to supply the team's kits. Diadora outfitted Náutico between 2024 and the end of 2025, marking Náutico's return to traditional agreements after five years using its own brand. In December 2025, Náutico announced a new partnership with the American brand Reebok. The two-season agreement guarantees the supply of complete match, training, and travel apparel for the 2026 and 2027 seasons.

=== Former main sponsors ===
In April 2013, a sponsorship agreement with Philco was announced, lasting until the end of the year.

On 9 September 2016, Náutico reached an agreement with Caixa, which became the club's new main shirt sponsor. It had been three years since Náutico last had a master sponsor displayed on its shirt.

After the end of Caixa's sponsorship deals with Brazilian clubs, Náutico signed an agreement with Royal Portuguese Hospital, which lasted until the end of 2019. The sponsorship became notable both for involving a hospital sponsoring a football club and for coinciding with Náutico's 2019 Série C title-winning campaign.

In the following season, following a trend already present in European football and which had become increasingly common in Brazil, Náutico signed a master sponsorship agreement with an online betting company, initially with Estadium in 2020. During the 2021 season, the club's main sponsor was Jogue Fácil.

For the 2022 season, in a joint initiative involving Náutico, Santa Cruz and Sport, aimed at strengthening football in Pernambuco, the clubs signed sponsorship agreements with the online betting company Betnacional, which negotiated separately and confidentially with each club. For Náutico, the company signed a two-season deal.

== Honours ==
=== Official tournaments ===
National
Competitions	Titles	Seasons
Campeonato Brasileiro Série C	1	2019
State
Competitions	Titles	Seasons
Campeonato Pernambucano	24	1934, 1939, 1945, 1950, 1951, 1952, 1954, 1960, 1963, 1964, 1965, 1966, 1967, 1968, 1974, 1984, 1985, 1989, 2001, 2002, 2004, 2018, 2021, 2022
Copa Pernambuco	1	2011

=== Others tournaments ===
==== Regional and Inter-state ====
- Torneio dos Campeões do Norte-Nordeste (1): 1952
- Copa dos Campeões do Norte (1): 1966
- Zona Norte-Nordeste da Taça Brasil (3): 1965, 1966, 1967

==== State ====
- Torneio Início de Pernambuco (14): 1942, 1944, 1949, 1952, 1953, 1962, 1963, 1964, 1965, 1975, 1978, 1979, 1980

=== Runners-up ===
- Campeonato Brasileiro Série A (1) 1967
- Campeonato Brasileiro Série B (2): 1988, 2011
- Campeonato Pernambucano (33): 1926, 1931, 1942, 1944, 1946, 1955, 1956, 1958, 1959, 1961, 1970, 1975, 1976, 1977, 1978, 1979, 1981, 1982, 1983, 1988, 1991, 1992, 1993, 1994, 1995, 2005, 2008, 2009, 2010, 2014, 2019, 2024, 2026
- Copa Pernambuco (3): 2003, 2007, 2019

=== Women's Football ===
- Campeonato Pernambucano de Futebol Feminino (4): 2005, 2006, 2020, 2021

== Statistics ==
Campeonato Brasileiro Serie A
Year		1971	1972	1973	1974	1975	1976	1977	1978	1979
Pos.		—	19th	34th	14th	13th	16th	51st	33rd	47th
Year	1980	1981	1982	1983	1984	1985	1986	1987	1988	1989
Pos.	27th	15th	26th	13th	6th	20th	31st	13th *	—	13th
Year	1990	1991	1992	1993	1994	1995	1996	1997	1998	1999
Pos.	13th	14th	19th	18th	24th	—	—	—	—	—
Year	2000	2001	2002	2003	2004	2005	2006	2007	2008	2009
Pos.	—	—	—	—	—	—	—	15th	16th	19th
Year	2010	2011	2012	2013	2014	2015	2016	2017	2018
Pos.	—	—	12th	20th	—	—	—

*Yellow Mode of Copa União.

Campeonato Brasileiro Série B
Year		1971	1972	1973	1974	1975	1976	1977	1978	1979
Pos.		18th	—	—	—	—	—	—	—	—
Year	1980	1981	1982	1983	1984	1985	1986	1987	1988	1989
Pos.	—	—	—	—	—	—	—	—	2nd	—
Year	1990	1991	1992	1993	1994	1995	1996	1997	1998	1999
Pos.	—	—	—	—	—	19th	3rd	3rd	21st	—
Year	2000	2001	2002	2003	2004	2005	2006	2007	2008	2009
Pos.	6th	5th	20th	7th	5th	3rd	3rd	—	—	—
Year	2010	2011	2012	2013	2014	2015	2016	2017	2018	2020
Pos.	13th	2nd	—	—	13th	5th	5th	20th	--	16th

Taça Brasil and Torneio Roberto Gomes Pedrosa (1968)
Year	1961	1964	1965	1966	1967	1968	1968
Pos.	4th	7th	3rd	3rd	2nd	4th(TB)	17th

Copa Libertadores
Year	1968
Pos.	17th

Copa Sudamericana
Year	2013
Pos.	22nd

Copa do Brasil
Year										1989
Pos.										14th
Year	1990	1991	1992	1993	1994	1995	1996	1997	1998	1999
Pos.	4th	—	18th	—	9th	28th	—	—	—	—
Year	2000	2001	2002	2003	2004	2005	2006	2007	2008	2009
Pos.	29th	44th	28th	—	14th	18th	13th	5th	10th	15th
Year	2010	2011	2012	2013	2014	2015	2016
Pos.	29th	13th	22nd	66th	32nd	25th	57th

== Current squad ==
As of 7 September 2026

Note: Flags indicate national team as defined under FIFA eligibility rules; some limited exceptions apply. Players may hold more than one non-FIFA nationality.

No.	Pos.	Nation	Player
1	GK	BRA	Muriel
2	DF	BRA	Arnaldo
3	DF	BRA	Betão
5	MF	BRA	Auremir
6	DF	BRA	Ryan Carlos
7	FW	BRA	Vinícius
8	MF	BRA	Wenderson
9	FW	BRA	Paulo Sérgio
10	MF	BRA	Jean Carlos (captain)
11	FW	BRA	Victor Andrade
13	DF	BRA	Índio
14	DF	BRA	Matheus Ribeiro
15	MF	BRA	Léo Oliveira
16	FW	BRA	Luiz Claudio
19	FW	BRA	Kauã Maranhão
21	MF	BRA	Felipe Redaelli

No.	Pos.	Nation	Player
22	MF	ARG	Patricio Núñez
23	DF	BRA	Igor Fernandes
24	FW	ARG	Benjamín Borasi (on loan from Sarmiento (Junín))
25	DF	BRA	Mateus Silva
27	MF	BRA	Luiz Felipe
29	FW	BRA	Júnior Todinho
34	DF	BRA	Wanderson
41	MF	BRA	Samuel
46	DF	BRA	Gustavo Henrique (on loan from Red Bull Bragantino)
55	GK	URU	Gastón Guruceaga
60	DF	BRA	Luiz Paulo
72	FW	BRA	Derek (on loan from Atlético Goianiense)
78	FW	BRA	Danielzinho
93	DF	BRA	Reginaldo
—	GK	BRA	Léo Honorio

=== Youth team ===
Note: Flags indicate national team as defined under FIFA eligibility rules; some limited exceptions apply. Players may hold more than one non-FIFA nationality.

No.	Pos.	Nation	Player
20	FW	BRA	Kevyn
35	MF	BRA	Pedro Ricardo

No.	Pos.	Nation	Player
37	DF	BRA	Juan Rikelme
99	FW	BRA	Isaque Ferreira

=== Out on loan ===
Note: Flags indicate national team as defined under FIFA eligibility rules; some limited exceptions apply. Players may hold more than one non-FIFA nationality.

No.	Pos.	Nation	Player
—	DF	BRA	Alemão (at Inter Limeira until 30 November 2026)
—	MF	BRA	Guilherme Ramos (at Azuriz until 30 September 2026)

No.	Pos.	Nation	Player
—	FW	BRA	Kayon (at Botafogo-PB until 30 November 2026)

== Current staff ==
Position	Name
Head coach	(Brazil) Bruno Pivetti
Assistant Coach	(Brazil) Kuki, Levi Gomes, Edson Miolo & Dudu Capixaba
Goalkeeping Coach	(Brazil) Júnior Matos
Fitness coaches	(Brazil) Ricardo Seguins, Elior Alves & Mauricio Copertino
Club doctors	(Brazil) Múcio Vaz, Paulo Regueira & Jorge Silva
Physiotherapists	(Brazil) Cléber Queiroga, Silmario & Andre
Masseurs	(Brazil) Alexandre & Irapuan
General Assistants	(Brazil) Araponga, Paulo Leme, Joselito, Pedro Gama & Pirata
Football Directors	(Brazil) Toninho Monteiro, Émerson Barbosa, Marcílio Sales & Guilherme Rocha
Football Superintendent	(Brazil) Alexandre Faria

== Top goalscorers ==
Player	Goals
1. Bita	223
2. Fernando Carvalheira	185
3. Kuki	184
4. Baiano	181
5. Ivson	118
6. Bizu	114
7. Ivanildo Cunha	112
8. Nino	102
9. Geraldo José	101
10. Nivaldo	95
11. Jorge Mendonça	95

Top goalscorers in the Campeonato Pernambucano

Player	Goals
1. Fernando Carvalheira	140
2. Bita	90
3. Baiano	80
4. Ivson	70

Top Náutico goalscorers in the Náutico-Santa Cruz derby (O Clássico das Emoções)

Player	Goals
1. Bita	16
2. Ivson	15
3. Fernando Carvalheira	12

Top Náutico goalscorers in the Náutico-Sport derby (O Clássico dos Clássicos)

Player	Goals
1. Fernando Carvalheira	25
2. Bita	23
3. Ivson	16

Top Appearances - All Competitions

Player	Appearances
1. Lourival (MF – 1980's)	385
2. Lula Monstrinho (DF – 1960's)	369
3. Kuki (FW – 2000's)	363

== Managers ==
- (Uruguay) H. Cabelli (1929–30), (1934–35), (1938–40), (1941)
- (Paraguay) Aurélio Munt (1945–47)
- (Uruguay) Humberto Cabelli (1949)
- (Brazil) Sylvio Pirillo (1955)
- (Uruguay) Ricardo Diéz (1957)
- (Brazil) Antoninho (1965)
- (Brazil) Paulinho de Almeida (1969)
- (Brazil) Sylvio Pirillo (1970)
- (Brazil) Antoninho (1971)
- (Brazil) Orlando Fantoni (1974–75)
- (Brazil) Ênio Andrade (1975)
- (Brazil) Danilo Alvim (1978)
- (Brazil) Paulo Emilio (1981)
- (Brazil) Pepe (1982)
- (Brazil) Ênio Andrade (1984)
- (Brazil) Paulo César Carpegiani (1986)
- (Brazil) Barbatana (1987)
- (Brazil) Carlos Alberto Torres (1987–88)
- (Brazil) Valmir Louruz (1988)
- (Brazil) Paulo César Carpegiani (1989)
- (Brazil) Roberto Oliveira (1989)
- (Brazil) Gílson Nunes (1991)
- (Brazil) Zé Mário (1992)
- (Brazil) Mário Juliato (1992)
- (Brazil) Hélio dos Anjos (1993)
- (Brazil) Gílson Nunes (1994)
- (Brazil) Mário Juliato (1994)
- (Brazil) Artur Neto (1998–99)
- (Brazil) Mauro Fernandes (2000)
- (Brazil) Estevam Soares (2001)
- (Brazil) Muricy Ramalho (5 May 2001 – 12 October 2002)
- (Brazil) Vágner Benazzi (2002)
- (Brazil) Givanildo Oliveira (2002–03)
- (Brazil) Heriberto da Cunha (20 March 2003 – 3 August 2003)
- (Brazil) Edson Gaúcho (4 August 2003 – 7 September 2003)
- (Brazil) Zé Teodoro (2004)
- (Brazil) Mauro Galvão (2005)
- (Brazil) Roberto Cavalo (5 February 2006 – 15 May 2006)
- (Brazil) Paulo Campos (15 May 2006 – 29 November 2006)
- (Brazil) Hélio dos Anjos (15 October 2006 – 8 March 2007)
- (Brazil) Paulo César Gusmão (9 March 2007 – 29 June 2007)
- (Brazil) Roberto Fernandes (1 July 2007 – 19 May 2008)
- (Brazil) Sangaletti (21 May 2008 – 25 May 2008)
- (Brazil) Leandro Machado (25 May 2008 – 14 July 2008)
- (Brazil) Pintado (16 July 2008 – 7 August 2008)
- (Brazil) Roberto Fernandes (7 August 2008 – 6 March 2009)
- (Brazil) Waldemar Lemos (29 March 2009 – 10 June 2009)
- (Brazil) Márcio Bittencourt (11 June 2009 – 12 July 2009)
- (Brazil) Geninho (13 July 2009 – 28 December 2009)
- (Brazil) Guilherme Macuglia (28 December 2009 – 1 April 2010)
- (Brazil) Alexandre Gallo (2 April 2010 – 29 September 2010)
- (Brazil) Roberto Fernandes (1 October 2010 – 2 May 2011)
- (Brazil) Waldemar Lemos (3 May 2011 – 8 April 2012)
- (Brazil) Alexandre Gallo (18 April 2012 – 31 January 2013)
- (Brazil) Vágner Mancini (3 February 2013 – 7 April 2013)
- (Brazil) Silas (12 April 2013 – 2 June 2013)
- (Brazil) Zé Teodoro (17 June 2013 – 15 August 2013)
- (Brazil) Jorginho (2013)
- (Brazil) Levi Gomes (2013)
- (Brazil) Marcelo Martelotte (2013)
- (Brazil) Lisca (2014)
- (Brazil) Sidney Moraes (2014)
- (Brazil) Dado Cavalcanti (2014)
- (Brazil) Moacir Júnior (2015)
- (Brazil) Lisca (2015)
- (Brazil) Gilmar Dal Pozzo (2015–16)
- (Brazil) Alexandre Gallo (2016–)
- (Brazil) Givanildo Oliveira (2016)
- (Brazil) Dado Cavalcanti (2017)
- (Brazil) Milton Cruz (2017)
- (Brazil) Waldemar Lemos (2017)
- (Brazil) Beto Campos (2017)
- (Brazil) Roberto Fernandes (2017–2018)
- (Brazil) Márcio Goiano (2018–2019)
- (Brazil) Gilmar Dal Pozzo (2019–2020)
- (Brazil) Gilson Kleina (2020)
- (Brazil) Hélio dos Anjos (2020–2021)
- (Brazil) Marcelo Chamusca (2021)
- (Brazil) Hélio dos Anjos (2021–2022)
- (Brazil) Felipe Conceição (2022)
- (Brazil) Roberto Fernandes (2022)
- (Brazil) Elano (2022)
- (Brazil) Dado Cavalcanti (2022–2023)
- (Brazil) Fernando Marchiori (2023)
- (Brazil) Bruno Pivetti (2023)
- (Brazil) Alan Aal (2024)
- (Brazil) Mazola Júnior (2018–2019)
