= 2022 Campeonato Brasileiro Série C =

Campeonato Brasileiro Série C
- Season: 2022
- Dates: 9 April – 8 October
- Champions: Mirassol (1st title)
- Promoted: ABC; Botafogo-SP; Mirassol; Vitória
- Relegated: Atlético Cearense; Brasil de Pelotas; Campinense; Ferroviário
- Matches played: 216
- Goals scored: 501 (2.32 per match)
- Top goalscorer: Alex Henrique (12 goals)
- Biggest home win: Mirassol 6–0 Atlético Cearense; Group A, R13, 3 July
- Biggest away win: Volta Redonda 0–3 Aparecidense; Group A, R12, 26 June; Altos 0–3 Paysandu; Group A, R18, 6 August
- Highest scoring: 6 goals Ypiranga 3–3 Figueirense; Group A, R9, 4 June; Manaus 4–2 Ferroviário; Group A, R13, 2 July; Mirassol 6–0 Atlético Cearense; Group A, R13, 3 July; Figueirense 5–1 Vitória; Group C, R2, 28 August; Mirassol 3–3 Volta Redonda; Group B, R4, 11 September
- Longest winning run: 4 games Botafogo-SP; Paysandu
- Longest unbeaten run: 9 games Vitória
- Longest winless run: 8 games Campinense
- Longest losing run: 6 games Ferroviário; Floresta
- Highest attendance: 28,006; Vitória 3–1 Brasil de Pelotas; Group A, R19, 13 August
- Lowest attendance: 41; Floresta 0–1 Manaus; Group A, R6, 14 May
- Total attendance: 821,637
- Average attendance: 3,804

The 2022 Campeonato Brasileiro Série C was a football competition held in Brazil, equivalent to the third division. It began on 9 April and ended on 8 October 2022.

Twenty teams competed in the tournament, twelve returning from the 2021 season, four promoted from the 2021 Campeonato Brasileiro Série D (ABC, Aparecidense, Atlético Cearense and Campinense) and four relegated from the 2021 Campeonato Brasileiro Série B (Brasil de Pelotas, Confiança, Remo and Vitória).

In the finals, Mirassol won their first title after defeating ABC 2–0 on aggregate.

Mirassol, ABC, Botafogo-SP and Vitória were promoted to the 2023 Campeonato Brasileiro Série B, while Atlético Cearense, Brasil de Pelotas, Campinense and Ferroviário were relegated to the 2023 Campeonato Brasileiro Série D.

== Format changes ==
Starting from this edition, the first stage had only one group where each team played the other teams in a single round-robin tournament instead of two groups played on a home-and-away round-robin basis. The top eight teams advanced to the second stage, while the bottom four were relegated.

== Teams ==
Location of teams in 2022 Série C

Pos.	Relegated from 2021 Série B
17th	Remo
18th	Vitória
19th	Confiança
20th	Brasil de Pelotas

Pos.	Promoted from 2021 Série D
1st	Aparecidense
2nd	Campinense
3rd	ABC
4th	Atlético Cearense

=== Number of teams by state ===
Number of teams	State	Team(s)
3	Ceará	Atlético Cearense, Ferroviário and Floresta
3	Rio Grande do Sul	Brasil de Pelotas, São José and Ypiranga
2	Pará	Paysandu and Remo
2	Paraíba	Botafogo-PB and Campinense
2	São Paulo	Botafogo-SP and Mirassol
1	Amazonas	Manaus
1	Bahia	Vitória
1	Goiás	Aparecidense
1	Piauí	Altos
1	Rio de Janeiro	Volta Redonda
1	Rio Grande do Norte	ABC
1	Santa Catarina	Figueirense
1	Sergipe	Confiança

=== Stadiums and locations ===
Team	Home city	State	Stadium	Capacity
ABC	Natal	Rio Grande do Norte	Frasqueirão	18,000
Altos	Altos	Piauí	Felipe Raulino	4,000
Aparecidense	Aparecida de Goiânia	Goiás	Annibal Batista de Toledo	6,645
Atlético Cearense	Fortaleza	Ceará	Antônio Cruz	3,000
Botafogo-PB	João Pessoa	Paraíba	Almeidão	25,770
Botafogo-SP	Ribeirão Preto	São Paulo	Santa Cruz	29,292
Brasil de Pelotas	Pelotas	Rio Grande do Sul	Bento Freitas	29,130
Campinense	Campina Grande	Paraíba	Amigão	19,000
Confiança	Aracaju	Sergipe	Batistão	15,575
Ferroviário	Fortaleza	Ceará	Presidente Vargas	20,262
Figueirense	Florianópolis	Santa Catarina	Orlando Scarpelli	19,584
Floresta	Fortaleza	Ceará	Domingão	10,500
Manaus	Manaus	Amazonas	Arena da Amazônia	44,000
Mirassol	Mirassol	São Paulo	Campos Maia	15,000
Paysandu	Belém	Pará	Estádio da Curuzu	16,200
Remo	Belém	Pará	Baenão	13,792
São José	Porto Alegre	Rio Grande do Sul	Passo D'Areia	15,000
Vitória	Salvador	Bahia	Barradão	34,535
Volta Redonda	Volta Redonda	Rio de Janeiro	Raulino de Oliveira	20,255
Ypiranga	Erechim	Rio Grande do Sul	Colosso da Lagoa	22,000

== Personnel and kits ==
Team	Manager	Captain	Kit manufacturer	Kit main sponsor
ABC	(Brazil) Fernando Marchiori	(Brazil) Richardson	Elefante MQ (club manufactured kit)	Upsports.bet
Altos	(Brazil) Fernando Tonet	(Brazil) Betinho	Pratic Sport	Carvalho Mercadão
Aparecidense	(Brazil) Moacir Júnior	(Brazil) Wesley Matos	Tolledo Sports	LAS
Atlético Cearense	(Brazil) Mozart Neto (caretaker)	(Brazil) Carlão	Fibber	Hospital Uniclinic
Botafogo-PB	(Brazil) Itamar Schülle	(Brazil) Leandro Camilo	W A Sport	PixBet
Botafogo-SP	(Brazil) Paulo Baier	(Brazil) Fillipe Soutto	Volt Sport	Mundo Invest
Brasil de Pelotas	(Brazil) Thiago Gomes	(Brazil) Karl	Xavante (club manufactured kit)	Banrisul
Campinense	(Brazil) Flávio Araújo	(Brazil) Mauro Iguatu	Super Bolla	PixBet
Confiança	(Brazil) Vinícius Eutrópio	(Brazil) Ítalo	Super Bolla	Banese Card
Ferroviário	(Brazil) Francisco Diá	(Brazil) Fredson	T33 (club manufactured kit)	Zenir
Figueirense	(Brazil) Júnior Rocha	(Brazil) Wilson	Volt Sport	Champion Watch
Floresta	(Brazil) Leston Júnior	(Brazil) Maílson	Golaço	Nega Palito Jeans
Manaus	(Brazil) Evaristo Piza	(Brazil) Paulo Sérgio	Ícone Sports	Bemol
Mirassol	(Brazil) Ricardo Catalá	(Brazil) Camilo	Physicus	Guaraná Poty
Paysandu	(Brazil) Márcio Fernandes	(Brazil) Genílson	Lobo (club manufactured kit)	Banpará
Remo	(Brazil) Gerson Gusmão	(Brazil) Marlon	Volt Sport	Banpará
São José	(Brazil) Paulo Henrique Marques	(Brazil) Fábio Rampi	Weefe	Banrisul
Vitória	(Brazil) João Burse	(Brazil) Alan Santos	Volt Sport	Betnacional
Volta Redonda	(Brazil) Rogério Corrêa	(Brazil) Bruno Barra	Pratic Sport	Universidade de Vassouras
Ypiranga	(Brazil) Luizinho Vieira	(Brazil) Gedeílson	Clanel	Banrisul

=== Managerial changes ===
Team	Outgoing manager	Manner of departure	Date of vacancy	Position in table	Incoming manager	Date of appointment	Ref
Altos	(Brazil) Paulinho Kobayashi	End of contract	21 October 2021	Pre-season	(Brazil) Evandro Guimarães	21 October 2021	
Botafogo-SP	(Brazil) Samuel Dias	End of caretaker spell	15 November 2021	Pre-season	(Brazil) Leandro Zago	19 November 2021	
Figueirense	(Brazil) Jorginho	End of contract	18 November 2021	Pre-season	(Brazil) Júnior Rocha	23 November 2021	
Ypiranga	(Brazil) Júnior Rocha	End of contract	19 November 2021	Pre-season	(Brazil) Luizinho Vieira	25 November 2021	
Vitória	(Japan) Wagner Lopes	End of contract	28 November 2021	Pre-season	(Brazil) Dado Cavalcanti	22 December 2021	
Paysandu	(Brazil) Wilton Bezerra	End of caretaker spell	4 December 2021	Pre-season	(Brazil) Márcio Fernandes	4 December 2021	
Remo	(Brazil) Eduardo Baptista	End of contract	12 December 2021	Pre-season	(Brazil) Paulo Bonamigo	14 December 2021	
Floresta	(Brazil) Daniel Rocha	Demoted to assistant manager	20 December 2021	Pre-season	(Brazil) Ricardo Drubscky	20 December 2021	
Atlético Cearense	(Brazil) Raimundo Wágner	Resigned	11 January 2022	State leagues	(Brazil) Reginaldo França	12 January 2022	
Ferroviário	(Brazil) Anderson Batatais	Sacked	5 February 2022	State leagues	(Brazil) Paulinho Kobayashi	6 February 2022	
Altos	(Brazil) Evandro Guimarães	Resigned	11 February 2022	State leagues	(Brazil) Carlos Rabello (Note: Cristiano Bassoli was the caretaker manager in the Campeonato Piauiense 11th round against Oeirense on 13 February)	11 February 2022	
São José	(Brazil) Pingo	Sacked	14 February 2022	State leagues	(Brazil) Paulo Baier	14 February 2022	
Volta Redonda	(Brazil) Neto Colucci	Sacked	28 February 2022	State leagues	(Brazil) Wilson Leite (caretaker)	28 February 2022	
Mirassol	(Brazil) Eduardo Baptista	Resigned	2 March 2022	State leagues	(Brazil) Ivan Baitello (caretaker)	3 March 2022	
Aparecidense	(Brazil) Thiago Carvalho	Resigned	7 March 2022	State leagues	(Brazil) Eduardo Souza	9 March 2022	
Atlético Cearense	(Brazil) Reginaldo França	Sacked	11 March 2022	State leagues	(Brazil) Betinho (caretaker)	30 March 2022	
São José	(Brazil) Paulo Baier	Sacked	15 March 2022	State leagues	(Brazil) Paulo Henrique Marques	15 March 2022	
Ferroviário	(Brazil) Paulinho Kobayashi	Sacked	16 March 2022	State leagues	(Brazil) Roberto Fonseca	18 March 2022	
Vitória	(Brazil) Dado Cavalcanti	Sacked	17 March 2022	State leagues	(Brazil) Geninho	17 March 2022	
ABC	(Brazil) Moacir Júnior	Mutual agreement	18 March 2022	State leagues	(Brazil) Jonydei Tostão (caretaker)	19 March 2022	
Mirassol	(Brazil) Ivan Baitello	End of caretaker spell	19 March 2022	State leagues	(Brazil) Ricardo Catalá	19 March 2022	
Volta Redonda	(Brazil) Wilson Leite	End of caretaker spell	21 March 2022	State leagues	(Brazil) Rogério Corrêa	21 March 2022	
ABC	(Brazil) Jonydei Tostão	End of caretaker spell	22 March 2022	State leagues	(Brazil) Fernando Marchiori	22 March 2022	
Altos	(Brazil) Carlos Rabello	Sacked	10 April 2022	19th	(Brazil) Agnaldo Liz (Note: Cristiano Bassoli was the caretaker manager in the Campeonato Piauiense semifinals against Parnahyba on 13 April)	11 April 2022	
Confiança	(Brazil) Luizinho Lopes	Sacked	13 April 2022	18th	(Brazil) Felipe Loureiro (Note: Bibi was the caretaker manager on the 2nd round against Ypiranga on 16 April)	14 April 2022	
Vitória	(Brazil) Geninho	Sacked	20 April 2022	17th	(Brazil) Ricardo Amadeu (caretaker)	21 April 2022	
Vitória	(Brazil) Ricardo Amadeu	End of caretaker spell	26 April 2022	18th	(Brazil) Fabiano Soares	26 April 2022	
Altos	(Brazil) Agnaldo Liz	Sacked	26 April 2022	19th	(Brazil) Francisco Diá	26 April 2022	
Atlético Cearense	(Brazil) Betinho	End of caretaker spell	26 April 2022	20th	(Brazil) Roberto Carlos	26 April 2022	
Altos	(Brazil) Francisco Diá	Sacked	16 May 2022	19th	(Brazil) Fernando Tonet	16 May 2022	
Botafogo-SP	(Brazil) Leandro Zago	Sacked	23 May 2022	10th	(Brazil) Paulo Baier	23 May 2022	
Brasil de Pelotas	(Brazil) Jerson Testoni	Sacked	30 May 2022	19th	(Brazil) Cirilo (caretaker)	30 May 2022	
Aparecidense	(Brazil) Eduardo Souza	Sacked	6 June 2022	16th	(Brazil) Moacir Júnior	9 June 2022	
Brasil de Pelotas	(Brazil) Cirilo	End of caretaker spell	7 June 2022	20th	(Brazil) Thiago Gomes	7 June 2022	
Floresta	(Brazil) Ricardo Drubscky	Sacked	12 June 2022	14th	(Brazil) Leston Júnior	13 June 2022	
Ferroviário	(Brazil) Roberto Fonseca	Sacked	12 June 2022	11th	(Brazil) Sidney Moraes	12 June 2022	
Confiança	(Brazil) Felipe Loureiro	Resigned	18 June 2022	18th	(Brazil) Vinícius Eutrópio	20 June 2022	
Vitória	(Brazil) Fabiano Soares	Sacked	19 June 2022	16th	(Brazil) João Burse	19 June 2022	
Remo	(Brazil) Paulo Bonamigo	Sacked	19 June 2022	8th	(Brazil) Gerson Gusmão	21 June 2022	
Botafogo-PB	(Brazil) Gerson Gusmão	Signed by Remo	21 June 2022	4th	(Brazil) Itamar Schülle	21 June 2022	
Manaus	(Brazil) Evaristo Piza	Sacked	26 June 2022	9th	(Brazil) João Brigatti	28 June 2022	
Campinense	(Brazil) Ranielle Ribeiro	Sacked	3 July 2022	18th	(Brazil) Flávio Araújo	4 July 2022	
Ferroviário	(Brazil) Sidney Moraes	Sacked	4 July 2022	17th	(Brazil) Francisco Diá	4 July 2022	
Manaus	(Brazil) João Brigatti	Resigned	19 July 2022	11th	(Brazil) Evaristo Piza	19 July 2022	
Atlético Cearense	(Brazil) Roberto Carlos	Sacked	20 July 2022	20th	(Brazil) Mozart Neto (caretaker)	23 July 2022	

== Format ==
In the first stage, each team played on a single round-robin tournament against the other clubs. The top eight teams advanced to the second stage. In the second stage, the teams were divided into two groups of four teams each. Each group was played on a home-and-away round-robin basis. The top two teams of each group were promoted to the Série B, while the group winners advanced to the finals.

== First stage ==
In the first stage, each team played the other nineteen teams in a single round-robin tournament. The teams were ranked according to points (3 points for a win, 1 point for a draw, and 0 points for a loss). If tied on points, the following criteria would be used to determine the ranking: 1. Wins; 2. Goal difference; 3. Goals scored; 4. Fewest red cards; 5. Fewest yellow cards; 6. Draw in the headquarters of the Brazilian Football Confederation (Regulations Article 16).

The top eight teams advanced to the second stage, while the bottom four were relegated to Série D.

=== Group A ===
Pos	Team	Pld	W	D	L	GF	GA	GD	Pts	Qualification or relegation
1	Mirassol	19	10	3	6	32	20	+12	33	Advance to Second stage
2	Paysandu	19	9	6	4	31	17	+14	33	Advance to Second stage
3	Figueirense	19	8	9	2	27	18	+9	33	Advance to Second stage
4	Volta Redonda	19	10	2	7	29	22	+7	32	Advance to Second stage
5	Botafogo-SP	19	10	2	7	26	22	+4	32	Advance to Second stage
6	ABC	19	8	7	4	22	16	+6	31	Advance to Second stage
7	Vitória	19	8	5	6	21	15	+6	29	Advance to Second stage
8	Aparecidense	19	8	5	6	23	18	+5	29	Advance to Second stage
9	Botafogo-PB	19	7	8	4	17	13	+4	29	
10	Ypiranga	19	7	7	5	25	20	+5	28	
11	São José	19	7	5	7	33	27	+6	26	
12	Remo	19	7	5	7	25	22	+3	26	
13	Manaus	19	6	7	6	16	21	−5	25	
14	Confiança	19	6	5	8	12	17	−5	23	
15	Floresta	19	6	5	8	17	25	−8	23	
16	Altos	19	6	3	10	21	31	−10	21	
17	Atlético Cearense (R)	19	5	4	10	17	35	−18	19	Relegation to 2023 Campeonato Brasileiro Série D
18	Brasil de Pelotas (R)	19	4	5	10	19	29	−10	17	Relegation to 2023 Campeonato Brasileiro Série D
19	Ferroviário (R)	19	5	1	13	15	27	−12	16	Relegation to 2023 Campeonato Brasileiro Série D
20	Campinense (R)	19	4	4	11	15	28	−13	16	Relegation to 2023 Campeonato Brasileiro Série D

Source: CBF
Rules for classification: 1) points; 2) wins; 3) goal difference; 4) goals scored; 5) fewest red cards; 6) fewest yellow cards; 7) draw.
(R) Relegated

=== Results ===
Home \ Away	ABC	ALT	APA	ATL	BPB	BSP	BRA	CAM	CON	FER	FIG	FLO	MAN	MIR	PAY	REM	SJO	VIT	VOL	YPI
ABC							3–0	1–0	0–0			2–0	0–0	1–0	1–1		3–2		1–0	
Altos	2–1			0–1		1–3	3–2	1–0		1–0					0–3			0–0		3–0
Aparecidense	2–2	2–1		1–3	1–0							3–2		0–1	1–0		1–2	0–0		
Atlético Cearense	0–1					0–2		0–1		0–1	1–1		3–1			3–1		1–1		0–0
Botafogo-PB	0–0	2–1		2–0				1–1	1–0		1–1	1–1		1–1		0–0	2–1			
Botafogo-SP	2–0		0–2		2–1							0–1	1–0	2–2		2–1			2–1	1–0
Brasil de Pelotas			1–2	4–1	0–0	1–1			1–0	3–1	0–1		1–1			1–0				0–2
Campinense			1–1			1–3	2–0			2–0			1–2		1–3			0–1	0–1	0–0
Confiança		1–0	1–1	1–0		2–1		2–3		1–0						1–2	1–0		1–0	0–0
Ferroviário	1–3		1–0		1–0	1–0						0–2			1–2		2–0	0–0		1–2
Figueirense	2–1	4–1	2–1			2–1		4–0	0–0	1–0				0–2		0–0	3–2			
Floresta		2–2		2–3			2–1	1–1	1–0		0–0		0–1	0–2					1–1	
Manaus		0–0	1–0		0–0				0–0	4–2	1–1			2–1		1–0	1–1		1–2	
Mirassol		2–1		6–0			2–0	1–0	3–1	2–1					1–1		2–1	1–2		
Paysandu				5–0	2–1	4–1	1–1		1–0		1–1	0–1	2–0						2–1	1–1
Remo	2–0	1–2	0–0					4–0		2–1		2–0		3–1	2–2		2–2	2–1		
São José		4–1		1–1		2–1	1–1	2–1				4–0			2–0			1–2	3–1	
Vitória	2–2				0–1	0–1	3–1		3–0		2–0	0–1	1–0		1–0				1–2	
Volta Redonda		3–1	0–3	4–0	0–1		3–1			2–1	1–1			2–1		3–0				2–1
Ypiranga	0–0		0–2		1–2						3–3	2–0	5–0	2–1		2–1	2–2	2–1		

Source: CBF
Legend: Blue = home team win; Yellow = draw; Red = away team win.

== Second stage ==
In the second stage, each group was played on a home-and-away round-robin basis. The teams were ranked according to points (3 points for a win, 1 point for a draw, and 0 points for a loss). If tied on points, the following criteria would be used to determine the ranking: 1. Wins; 2. Goal difference; 3. Goals scored; 4. Head-to-head (if the tie was only between two teams); 5. Fewest red cards; 6. Fewest yellow cards; 7. Draw in the headquarters of the Brazilian Football Confederation (Regulations Article 20).

The top two teams of each group were promoted to the Série B. Group winners advanced to the finals.

=== Group B ===
Pos	Team	Pld	W	D	L	GF	GA	GD	Pts	Qualification
1	Mirassol (P)	6	3	3	0	11	8	+3	12	Advance to Finals and promoted to 2023 Campeonato Brasileiro Série B
2	Botafogo-SP (P)	6	3	1	2	11	8	+3	10	Promoted to 2023 Campeonato Brasileiro Série B
3	Aparecidense	6	2	1	3	8	10	−2	7	
4	Volta Redonda	6	1	1	4	7	11	−4	4	

Source: CBF
Rules for classification: 1) points; 2) wins; 3) goal difference; 4) goals scored; 5) head-to-head results (only between 2 teams); 6) fewest red cards; 7) fewest yellow cards; 8) draw.
(P) Promoted

==== Results ====
Home \ Away	APA	BSP	MIR	VOL
Aparecidense		1–3	2–2	1–0
Botafogo-SP	2–3		1–1	3–1
Mirassol	2–1	1–0		3–3
Volta Redonda	1–0	1–2	1–2	

Source: CBF
Legend: Blue = home team win; Yellow = draw; Red = away team win.

=== Group C ===
Pos	Team	Pld	W	D	L	GF	GA	GD	Pts	Qualification
1	ABC (P)	6	3	3	0	4	1	+3	12	Advance to Finals and promoted to 2023 Campeonato Brasileiro Série B
2	Vitória (P)	6	2	3	1	4	6	−2	9	Promoted to 2023 Campeonato Brasileiro Série B
3	Figueirense	6	2	1	3	8	6	+2	7	
4	Paysandu	6	1	1	4	3	6	−3	4	

Source: CBF
Rules for classification: 1) points; 2) wins; 3) goal difference; 4) goals scored; 5) head-to-head results (only between 2 teams); 6) fewest red cards; 7) fewest yellow cards; 8) draw.
(P) Promoted

==== Results ====
Home \ Away	ABC	FIG	PAY	VIT
ABC		2–1	1–0	0–0
Figueirense	0–0		2–1	5–1
Paysandu	0–1	1–0		1–1
Vitória	0–0	1–0	1–0	

Source: CBF
Legend: Blue = home team win; Yellow = draw; Red = away team win.

== Finals ==
The finals were played on a home-and-away two-legged basis, with the higher-seeded team hosting the second leg. If tied on aggregate, the away goals rule would not be used, extra time would not be played, and the penalty shoot-out would be used to determine the champions (Regulations Article 21).

The finalists were seeded according to their performance in the tournament. The teams were ranked according to overall points. If tied on overall points, the following criteria would be used to determine the ranking: 1. Overall wins; 2. Overall goal difference; 3. Draw in the headquarters of the Brazilian Football Confederation (Regulations Article 22).

Pos	Team	Pld	W	D	L	GF	GA	GD	Pts	Host
1	(São Paulo (state)) Mirassol	25	13	6	6	43	28	+15	45	2nd leg
2	(Rio Grande do Norte) ABC	25	11	10	4	26	17	+9	43	1st leg

Source: CBF

The matches were played on 1 and 8 October 2022.

Team 1	Agg.	Team 2	1st leg	2nd leg
ABC (Rio Grande do Norte)	0–2	(São Paulo (state)) Mirassol	0–0	0–2

=== Matches ===
1 October 2022
17:00

ABC (Rio Grande do Norte)	0–0	(São Paulo (state)) Mirassol
	Report

Frasqueirão, Natal
Attendance: 15,032
Referee: Rafael Rodrigo Klein (Rio Grande do Sul)

8 October 2022
17:00

Mirassol (São Paulo (state))	2–0	(Rio Grande do Norte) ABC
Camilo 3'; Vinícius Mingotti 45'	Report

Estádio Municipal José Maria de Campos Maia, Mirassol
Attendance: 9,265
Referee: Paulo Cesar Zanovelli da Silva (Minas Gerais)

== Top goalscorers ==
Rank	Player	Club	Goals
1	(Brazil) Alex Henrique	Aparecidense	12
2	(Brazil) Marlon	Paysandu	10
3	(Brazil) Camilo	Mirassol	9
4	(Brazil) Rafinha	Vitória	8
5	(Brazil) Gustavo Coutinho	Botafogo-PB	7
5	(Brazil) Gustavo Xuxa	Botafogo-SP	7
5	(Brazil) Lelê	Volta Redonda	7
5	(Brazil) Vinícius Mingotti	Mirassol	7
9	(Brazil) Cristiano	São José	6
9	(Brazil) Henan	ABC	6
9	(Brazil) Hugo Almeida	Ypiranga	6
9	(Brazil) Léo Artur	Figueirense	6
9	(Brazil) Rafhael Lucas	Volta Redonda	6
9	(Brazil) Thiago Santos	Brasil de Pelotas	6
9	(Colombia) Santiago Tréllez	Vitória	6

Source: CBF
