= List of Mirassol Futebol Clube seasons =

Mirassol Futebol Clube is a football club from Mirassol, São Paulo, established in 1925. Its achievements include winning the Campeonato Brasileiro Série D in 2020 and the Campeonato Brasileiro Série C in 2022, which allowed it to obtain promotion to the second division for the first time in its history.

Winners	Runners-up	Semi-finals or 3rd/4th	Relegated

== National league ==
Season	Division	Pld	W	D	L	GF	GA	GD	Pts	Pos	Top sc.
2008	Série C	6	1	1	4	7	11	−4	4	54th	
2011	Série D	12	6	2	4	14	14	0	20	6th	Victor (3)
2012	Série D	8	1	4	2	8	11	−3	7	29th	Caion (5)
2018	Série D	6	2	1	3	3	5	−2	7	42nd	
2020	Série D	24	15	5	4	49	15	+34	50	1st	Fabrício Daniel (11)
2021	Série C	18	6	1	11	17	26	−9	19	16th	Giovani; Raphael Macena (3)
2022	Série C	27	14	7	6	45	28	+17	49	1st	Camilo (9)
2023	Série B	38	18	9	11	42	31	+11	63	6th	Zé Roberto (8)
2024	Série B	38	19	10	9	42	26	+16	67	2nd	Dellatorre (10)
2025	Série A	38	18	13	7	63	39	+24	67	4th	Reinaldo (13)

== Campeonato Paulista ==
Season	Division	Pld	W	D	L	GF	GA	GD	Pts	Pos	Top sc.
1994	Série A3	0	0	0	0	0	0	0	()	()	
1995	Série A3	0	0	0	0	0	0	0	()	()	
1996	Série A3	0	0	0	0	0	0	0	()	()	
1997	Série A3	0	0	0	0	0	0	0	()	()	
1998	Série A2	0	0	0	0	0	0	0	()	()	
1999	Série A2	0	0	0	0	0	0	0	()	()	
2000	Série A2	0	0	0	0	0	0	0	()	()	
2001	Série A2	0	0	0	0	0	0	0	()	()	
2002	Série A2	0	0	0	0	0	0	0	()	()	
2003	Série A2	14	2	3	9	17	25	−8	9	8th	
2004	Série A3	21	13	2	6	38	26	+12	41	2nd	
2005	Série A2	24	10	7	7	32	22	+10	37	3rd	
2006	Série A2	18	5	7	6	32	28	+4	22	8th	
2007	Série A2	25	9	11	5	27	17	+10	38	6th 2nd	
2008	Série A1	19	9	2	8	29	28	+1	29	8th	
2009	Série A1	19	7	7	5	34	32	+2	28	7th	
2010	Série A1	19	5	7	7	24	27	−3	22	14th	
2011	Série A1	20	9	3	8	27	28	−1	30	QF	
2012	Série A1	19	6	7	6	31	25	+6	25	9th	
2013	Série A1	19	5	3	11	31	33	−2	18	17th	
2014	Série A2	19	10	6	3	38	21	+17	36	5th	
2015	Série A2	19	11	2	6	27	20	+7	35	5th	
2016	Série A2	24	15	4	5	33	17	+16	49	2nd	
2017	Série A1	12	4	3	5	17	17	0	15	9th	
2018	Série A1	17	4	7	6	15	18	−3	19	10th	
2019	Série A1	16	3	6	7	14	24	−10	15	12th	
2020	Série A1	14	5	5	4	19	14	+5	20	3rd	
2021	Série A1	14	5	4	5	15	19	−4	19	4th	
2022	Série A1	13	4	5	4	17	18	−1	17	10th	
2023	Série A1	14	5	4	5	15	14	+1	19	9th	
2024	Série A1	12	3	5	4	17	17	0	14	12th	
2025	Série A1	13	5	1	7	21	23	−2	16	8th	
2026	Série A1	8	2	2	4	10	8	+2	8	11th	

== Copa do Brasil ==
Season	Pld	W	D	L	GF	GA	GD	Pos	Top sc.
2021	1	0	0	1	2	3	−1	R1	
2022	2	1	0	1	3	3	0	R2	
2026	4	1	2	1	4	4	0	R16	

== Copa Paulista ==
Season	Pld	W	D	L	GF	GA	GD	Pts	Pos	Top sc.
2007	–	–	–	–	–	–	–	-	–	
2008	24	9	7	8	–	–	+11	34	SF	
2009	14	3	3	8	–	–	−9	12	R1	
2013	16	7	4	5	27	16	+11	25	R2	
2014	12	3	3	6	10	13	−3	12	R1	
2015	16	9	4	3	30	15	+15	31	QF	
2016	16	5	6	5	18	17	+1	21	R2	
2017	18	4	6	8	20	25	−5	18	R2	
2018	18	9	6	3	23	13	+10	33	QF	
2019	24	11	8	5	37	19	+18	41	SF	
2023	10	4	3	3	12	8	+4	15	R1	
2024	8	1	4	3	8	11	−3	7	R1	

== Copa Libertadores ==
Season	Pld	W	D	L	GF	GA	GD	Pos	Top sc.
2026	8	4	2	2	8	5	+3	R16	Eduardo (2)
