= 2025 Campeonato Paulista =

Campeonato Paulista - Série A1
- Season: 2025
- Dates: 15 January – 27 March 2025
- Champions: Corinthians
- Relegated: Água Santa; Inter de Limeira
- Matches: 104
- Goals: 252 (2.42 per match)
- Top goalscorer: Guilherme (10 goals)

The 2025 Campeonato Paulista de Futebol Profissional da Primeira Divisão - Série A1 was the 124th season of São Paulo's top professional football league. The competition was played from 15 January to 27 March 2025.

== Format ==
- In the first stage the sixteen seeded teams were drawn into four groups of four teams each, with each team playing once against the twelve clubs from the other three groups. After each team has played twelve matches, the top two teams of each group qualified for the quarter-final stage.
- After the completion of the first stage, the two clubs with the lowest number of points, regardless of the group, were relegated to the Campeonato Paulista Série A2.
- Quarter-finals and semi-finals were played in a single match, with the best placed team playing at home.
- The finals were played in a two-legged home and away fixture, with the best placed team playing the second leg at home.
- In case of a draw in any knockout stage, the match was decided by a penalty shoot-out.
- The two highest-placed teams not otherwise qualified for the 2026 Copa do Brasil.
- The top three highest-placed teams in the general table at the end of the competition who are not playing in any level of the national Brazilian football league system qualified for the 2026 Campeonato Brasileiro Série D.

== TV partners ==
The broadcasting rights of the 2025 Campeonato Paulista were acquired by Record TV for the fourth consecutive year, with their streaming app Play Plus also transmitting the matches live. Aside of that, the streaming platforms HBO Max (owned by TNT) and CazéTV (in YouTube) also broadcast the matches live.

== Teams ==
Location of teams in 2025 Campeonato Paulista

Club	Home city	Head coach	2024 result
Água Santa	Diadema	(Brazil) Pintado	10th
Botafogo	Ribeirão Preto	(Brazil) Márcio Zanardi	13th
Corinthians	São Paulo (Itaquera)	(Argentina) Ramón Díaz	11th
Guarani	Campinas	(Brazil) Maurício Souza	14th
Internacional de Limeira	Limeira	(Brazil) Márcio Fernandes	6th
Mirassol	Mirassol	(Brazil) Ivan Baitello (caretaker)	12th
Noroeste	Bauru	(Brazil) Allan Aal	2nd (Série A2)
Novorizontino	Novo Horizonte	(Brazil) Eduardo Baptista	4th
Palmeiras	São Paulo (Barra Funda)	(Portugal) Abel Ferreira	1st
Ponte Preta	Campinas	(Brazil) Alberto Valentim	7th
Portuguesa	São Paulo (Pari)	(Brazil) Cauan de Almeida	8th
Red Bull Bragantino	Bragança Paulista	(Brazil) Fernando Seabra	3rd
Santos	Santos	(Portugal) Pedro Caixinha	2nd
São Bernardo	São Bernardo do Campo	(Brazil) Ricardo Catalá	9th
São Paulo	São Paulo (Morumbi)	(Argentina) Luis Zubeldía	5th
Velo Clube	Rio Claro	(Brazil) Guilherme Alves	1st (Série A2)

== First stage ==
=== Group A ===
Pos	Team	Pld	W	D	L	GF	GA	GD	Pts	Qualification
1	Corinthians	12	8	3	1	20	13	+7	27	Knockout stage
2	Mirassol	12	5	1	6	21	21	0	16	Knockout stage
3	Botafogo-SP	12	2	5	5	8	13	−5	11	
4	Inter de Limeira (R)	12	0	7	5	9	19	−10	7	Relegation to Série A2

Source: Soccerway
(R) Relegated

=== Group B ===
Pos	Team	Pld	W	D	L	GF	GA	GD	Pts	Qualification
1	Santos	12	5	3	4	20	14	+6	18	Knockout stage
2	Red Bull Bragantino	12	5	2	5	14	13	+1	17	Knockout stage
3	Guarani	12	3	4	5	14	14	0	13	
4	Portuguesa	12	2	7	3	15	16	−1	13	

Source: Soccerway

=== Group C ===
Pos	Team	Pld	W	D	L	GF	GA	GD	Pts	Qualification
1	São Paulo	12	5	4	3	18	13	+5	19	Knockout stage
2	Novorizontino	12	4	6	2	13	11	+2	18	Knockout stage
3	Noroeste	12	1	5	6	12	19	−7	8	
4	Água Santa (R)	12	1	4	7	10	23	−13	7	Relegation to Série A2

Source: Soccerway
(R) Relegated

=== Group D ===
Pos	Team	Pld	W	D	L	GF	GA	GD	Pts	Qualification
1	São Bernardo	12	7	2	3	19	16	+3	23	Knockout stage
2	Palmeiras	12	6	5	1	21	10	+11	23	Knockout stage
3	Ponte Preta	12	6	4	2	12	8	+4	22	
4	Velo Clube	12	3	4	5	13	16	−3	13	

Source: Soccerway

== Knockout stage ==
The knockout stage of the 2025 Campeonato Paulista will begin on 1 March 2025 with the quarter-finals and end on 27 March 2025 with the final. A total of eight teams will compete in the knockout stage.

=== Round dates ===
Round	First leg	Second leg
Quarter-finals	1–3 March 2025	–
Semi-finals	9–10 March 2025	–
Finals	16 March 2025	27 March 2025

=== Format ===
The quarter-finals will be played in a single match at the stadium of the better-ranked team in the first phase. If the match ends in a draw, the tie will be decided via a penalty shoot-out. The semi-finals will be played with the same format as the quarter-finals. The finals will be played over two legs, with the team having the better record in matches from the previous stages hosting the second leg.

=== Qualified teams ===
Group	Winners	Runners-up
A	Corinthians	Mirassol
B	Santos	Red Bull Bragantino
C	São Paulo	Novorizontino
D	São Bernardo	Palmeiras

=== Bracket ===
Quarterfinals
A1	Corinthians	2
A2	Mirassol	0
B1	Santos	2
B2	Red Bull Bragantino	0
D1	São Bernardo	0
D2	Palmeiras	3
C1	São Paulo	1
C2	Novorizontino	0

Semifinals
A1	Corinthians	2
B1	Santos	1
D2	Palmeiras	1
C1	São Paulo	0

Finals
A1	Corinthians	1	0	1
D2	Palmeiras	0	0	0

=== Quarter-finals ===
Team 1	Score	Team 2
São Bernardo	0−3	Palmeiras
Corinthians	2−0	Mirassol
Santos	2−0	Red Bull Bragantino
São Paulo	1−0	Novorizontino

1 March 2025
20:30 UTC-03:00

São Bernardo	0–3	Palmeiras
	Report	Estêvão 16', 45+2'; López 58'

Estádio 1º de Maio, São Bernardo do Campo
Attendance: 8,875
Referee: Matheus Delgado Candançan

2 March 2025
18:30 UTC-03:00

Corinthians	2–0	Mirassol
Romero 22'; Depay 76'	Report

Neo Química Arena, São Paulo
Attendance: 44,436
Referee: Daiane Muniz

2 March 2025
20:45 UTC-03:00

Santos	2–0	Red Bull Bragantino
Neymar 9'; João Schmidt 56'	Report

Vila Belmiro, Santos
Attendance: 14,832
Referee: Raphael Claus

3 March 2025
20:00 UTC-03:00

São Paulo	1–0	Novorizontino
Calleri 63'	Report

Morumbi, São Paulo
Attendance: 52,315
Referee: Edina Alves Batista

=== Semi-finals ===
Team 1	Score	Team 2
Corinthians	2–1	Santos
Palmeiras	1–0	São Paulo

9 March 2025
18:30 UTC-03:00

Corinthians	2–1	Santos
Yuri Alberto 12'; Garro 56'	Report	Tiquinho Soares 38'

Neo Química Arena, São Paulo
Attendance: 48,046
Referee: Matheus Delgado Candançan

10 March 2025
21:35 UTC-03:00

Palmeiras	1–0	São Paulo
Raphael Veiga 45+2' (pen.)	Report

Allianz Parque, São Paulo
Attendance: 38,865
Referee: Flávio Rodrigues de Souza

=== Finals ===
Team 1	Agg.	Team 2	1st leg	2nd leg
Corinthians	1–0	Palmeiras	1–0	0–0

==== First leg ====
16 March 2025
18:30 UTC-03:00

Palmeiras	0–1	Corinthians
	Report	Yuri Alberto 58'

Allianz Parque, São Paulo
Attendance: 40,992
Referee: Raphael Claus

==== Second leg ====
27 March 2025
21:35 UTC-03:00

Corinthians	0–0	Palmeiras
	Report

Neo Química Arena, São Paulo
Attendance: 48,932
Referee: Matheus Delgado Candançan

== Overall table ==
Pos	Team	Pld	W	D	L	GF	GA	GD	Pts	Qualification or relegation
1	Corinthians (C)	16	11	4	1	25	14	+11	37	Finalists
2	Palmeiras	16	8	6	2	25	11	+14	30	Finalists
3	São Paulo	14	6	4	4	19	14	+5	22	Eliminated in the Semi-finals
4	Santos	14	6	3	5	23	16	+7	21	Eliminated in the Semi-finals
5	São Bernardo	13	7	2	4	19	19	0	23	Eliminated in the Quarter-finals
6	Novorizontino	13	4	6	3	13	12	+1	18	Eliminated in the Quarter-finals
7	Red Bull Bragantino	13	5	2	6	14	15	−1	17	Eliminated in the Quarter-finals
8	Mirassol	13	5	1	7	21	23	−2	16	Eliminated in the Quarter-finals
9	Ponte Preta	12	6	4	2	12	8	+4	22	
10	Guarani	12	3	4	5	14	14	0	13	
11	Velo Clube	12	3	4	5	13	16	−3	13	
12	Portuguesa	12	2	7	3	15	16	−1	13	
13	Botafogo	12	2	5	5	8	13	−5	11	
14	Noroeste	12	1	5	6	12	19	−7	8	
15	Água Santa (R)	12	1	4	7	10	23	−13	7	Relegation to Série A2
16	Inter de Limeira (R)	12	0	7	5	9	19	−10	7	Relegation to Série A2

Source: ge
Rules for classification: 1st points; 2nd wins; 3rd goal difference; 4th goals scored; 5th head-to-head results; 6th least red cards received; 7th least yellow cards received; 8th draw.
(C) Champions; (R) Relegated

== Awards ==
=== Team of the Year ===
Pos.	Player	Club
GK	(Brazil) Hugo Souza	Corinthians
DF	(Brazil) Matheuzinho	Corinthians
DF	(Ecuador) Robert Arboleda	São Paulo
DF	(Brazil) Murilo	Palmeiras
DF	(Argentina) Gonzalo Escobar	Santos
MF	(Colombia) Richard Ríos	Palmeiras
MF	(Peru) André Carrillo	Corinthians
MF	(Brazil) Lucas Moura	São Paulo
FW	(Brazil) Estêvão	Palmeiras
FW	(Brazil) Yuri Alberto	Corinthians
FW	(Brazil) Guilherme	Santos
Head coach	(Argentina) Ramón Díaz	Corinthians

Player of the Year

The Player of the Year was awarded to Yuri Alberto of Corinthians.

Breakthrough Player of the Year

The Breakthrough Player of the Year was awarded to Vinicinho of Red Bull Bragantino.

Most Beautiful Goal

The Most Beautiful Goal was awarded to Neymar of Santos.

Best Dribble

The Best Dribble was awarded to Memphis Depay of Corinthians.

Countryside Best Player of the Year

The Countryside Player of the Year was awarded to Carlão of Noroeste.

Referee of the Year

The Referee of the Year was awarded to Matheus Delgado Candançan.

== Top scorers ==
Rank	Player	Team	Goals
1	(Brazil) Guilherme	Santos	10
2	(Brazil) Daniel Amorim	Velo Clube	6
3	(Brazil) André Silva	São Paulo	5
3	(Brazil) Carlão	Noroeste	5
3	(Brazil) Estêvão	Palmeiras	5
3	(Brazil) Fabrício Daniel	São Bernardo	5
3	(Brazil) Maurício	Palmeiras	5
3	(Brazil) Talles Magno	Corinthians	5
3	(Brazil) Tiquinho Soares	Santos	5
3	(Brazil) Yuri Alberto	Corinthians	5
