= 2022 Campeonato Paulista knockout stage =

The knockout stage of the 2022 Campeonato Paulista began on 22 March with the quarter-finals, and ended on 3 April 2022 with the final. A total of eight teams competed in the knockout stage.

== Knockout stage ==
=== Round dates ===
Round	First leg	Second leg
Quarter-finals	22–24 March 2022	–
Semi-finals	26–27 March 2022	–
Finals	30 March 2022	3 April 2022

=== Format ===
The quarter-finals will be played in a single match at the stadium of the better-ranked team in the first phase. If no goals were scored during the match, the tie will be decided via a penalty shoot-out. The semi-finals will be played with the same format as the quarter-finals. The finals will be played over two legs, with the team having the better record in matches from the previous stages hosting the second leg.

=== Qualified teams ===
Group	Winners	Runners-up
A	Corinthians	Guarani
B	São Paulo	São Bernardo
C	Palmeiras	Ituano
D	Red Bull Bragantino	Santo André

=== Bracket ===
Quarterfinals
C1	Palmeiras	2
C2	Ituano	0
D1	Red Bull Bragantino	1
D2	Santo André	0
B1	São Paulo	4
B2	São Bernardo	1
A1	Corinthians	1 (7)
A2	Guarani	1 (6)

Semifinals
C1	Palmeiras	2
D1	Red Bull Bragantino	1
B1	São Paulo	2
A1	Corinthians	1

Finals
C1	Palmeiras	1	4	5
B1	São Paulo	3	0	3

=== Quarter-finals ===
Team 1	Score	Team 2
São Paulo	4−1	São Bernardo
Red Bull Bragantino	1–0	Santo André
Palmeiras	2−0	Ituano
Corinthians	1−1 (7–6 p)	Guarani

22 March 2022
20:30 UTC-03:00

São Paulo	4–1	São Bernardo
Nestor 65'; Pablo Maia 83'; Marquinhos 88'; Calleri 90+2'	Report	Davó 53'

Morumbi, São Paulo
Attendance: 29,731
Referee: Douglas Marques das Flores

23 March 2022
19:00 UTC-03:00

Red Bull Bragantino	1–0	Santo André
Artur 40'	Report

Estádio Nabi Abi Chedid, Bragança Paulista
Attendance: 3,530
Referee: Raphael Claus

23 March 2022
21:35 UTC-03:00

Palmeiras	2–0	Ituano
Raphael Veiga 3' (pen.); Rony 55'	Report

Allianz Parque, São Paulo
Attendance: 27,260
Referee: Thiago Luis Scarascati

24 March 2022
19:00 UTC-03:00

Corinthians	1–1	Guarani
Gil 43'	Report	João Victor 54'
Penalties
Fábio Santos (penalty scored); Giuliano (penalty scored); Renato Augusto (penalty scored); Júnior Moraes (penalty scored); João Victor (penalty scored); Fagner (penalty scored); Adson (penalty scored)	7–6	(penalty scored) Giovanni Augusto; (penalty scored) Kozlinski; (penalty scored) Lucas Venuto; (penalty scored) Lucão do Break; (penalty scored) Bruno Silva; (penalty scored) Ronald; (penalty missed) Madison

Neo Química Arena, São Paulo
Attendance: 39,283
Referee: Flávio Rodrigues de Souza

=== Semi-finals ===
Team 1	Score	Team 2
Palmeiras	2−1	Red Bull Bragantino
São Paulo	2−1	Corinthians

26 March 2022
18:30 UTC-03:00

Palmeiras	2–1	Red Bull Bragantino
Murilo 2'; Rony 40'	Report	Léo Realpe 18'

Allianz Parque, São Paulo
Attendance: 37,618
Referee: Luiz Flávio de Oliveira

27 March 2022
16:00 UTC-03:00

São Paulo	2–1	Corinthians
Welington 42'; Alisson 63'	Report	Jô 86'

Morumbi, São Paulo
Attendance: 53,924
Referee: Vinícius Gonçalves Dias Araújo

=== Finals ===
Team 1	Agg.	Team 2	1st leg	2nd leg
Palmeiras	5–3	São Paulo	1–3	4–0

==== First leg ====
30 March 2022
21:40 UTC-03:00

São Paulo	3–1	Palmeiras
Calleri 45+6' (pen.), 81'; Pablo Maia 64'	Report	Raphael Veiga 85'

Morumbi, São Paulo
Attendance: 60,383
Referee: Douglas Marques das Flores

São Paulo	Palmeiras

==== Second leg ====
3 April 2022
16:00 UTC-03:00

Palmeiras	4–0	São Paulo
Danilo 22'; Zé Rafael 28'; Raphael Veiga 47', 81'	Report

Allianz Parque, São Paulo
Attendance: 31,836
Referee: Raphael Claus

Palmeiras	São Paulo

2022 Campeonato Paulista champions

24th title
