= Ney da Matta =

Brazilian football manager (1967–2019)

Personal information
- Full name: Roneivaldo da Matta Soares
- Date of birth: 17 April 1967
- Place of birth: Ipatinga, Brazil
- Date of death: 19 May 2019 (aged 52)
- Place of death: Ipatinga, Brazil

Managerial career
- Years: Team
- 1998: Tupi
- 1999: Unibol
- 1999–2000: Valeriodoce
- 2000: Tupi
- 2003: Ipatinga
- 2004: Democrata de Sete Lagoas
- 2004: Uberlândia
- 2005: CRB
- 2006: Sampaio Corrêa
- 2006: Uberlândia
- 2006: Ipatinga
- 2007: Brasil de Pelotas
- 2008: Grêmio Inhumense
- 2009: Linense
- 2009: Guará
- 2010: CRAC
- 2011–2012: Ipatinga
- 2012: Brasiliense
- 2012: Vila Nova
- 2013: Araxá
- 2013: Anápólis
- 2014: Boa Esporte
- 2014: Ipatinga
- 2015: Boa Esporte
- 2016: Tombense
- 2016: Boa Esporte
- 2017: Guarani
- 2017: Campinense
- 2017: CSA
- 2018: Remo
- 2018: América de Natal
- 2019: CRAC

Roneivaldo da Matta Soares, commonly known as Ney da Matta (17 April 1967 – 18 May 2019), was a Brazilian football manager, last in charge at CRAC.

== Honours ==
Ipatinga

- Taça Minas Gerais: 2011

Boa Esporte

- Campeonato Brasileiro Série C: 2016
