= 2020 Campeonato Paulista knockout stage =

The knockout stage of the 2020 Campeonato Paulista began on 29 July with the quarter-finals and concluded on 8 August 2020 with the final. A total of eight teams competed in the knockout stage.

== Round and draw dates ==
All draws were held at Federação Paulista de Futebol headquarters in São Paulo, Brazil.

Round	Draw date	First leg	Second leg
Quarter-finals	27 July 2020	29–30 July 2020	–
Semi-finals		2 August 2020	–
Finals	–	5 August 2020	8 August 2020

== Format ==
The quarter-finals were played over a single match at the stadium of the better-ranked team in the first phase. If no goals were scored during the match, the tie was decided via a penalty shoot-out. The semi-finals were played with the same format as the quarter-finals. The finals were played over two legs, with the team holding the better record in matches from the previous stages hosting the second leg.

== Qualified teams ==
Group	Winners	Runners-up
A	Santos	Ponte Preta
B	Palmeiras	Santo André
C	São Paulo	Mirassol
D	Red Bull Bragantino	Corinthians

== Bracket ==
Quarterfinals
A1	Santos	1
A2	Ponte Preta	3
B1	Palmeiras	2
B2	Santo André	0
C1	São Paulo	2
C2	Mirassol	3
D1	Red Bull Bragantino	0
D2	Corinthians	2

Semifinals
A2	Ponte Preta	0
B1	Palmeiras	1
C2	Mirassol	0
D2	Corinthians	1

Finals
B1	Palmeiras (p)	0	1	1 (4)
D2	Corinthians	0	1	1 (3)

== Quarter-finals ==
Team 1	Score	Team 2
São Paulo (Brazil)	2–3	(Brazil) Mirassol
Palmeiras (Brazil)	2–0	(Brazil) Santo André
Red Bull Bragantino (Brazil)	0–2	(Brazil) Corinthians
Santos (Brazil)	1–3	(Brazil) Ponte Preta

29 July 2020
19:00 UTC-03:00

São Paulo	2–3	Mirassol
Pablo 36'; Vitor Bueno 37'	Report	Zé Roberto 20', 32'; Daniel Borges 80'

Morumbi, São Paulo
Attendance: 0
Referee: Flavio Rodrigues de Souza

29 July 2020
21:30 UTC-03:00

Palmeiras	2–0	Santo André
Felipe Melo 88'; Rocha 90+4'	Report

Allianz Parque, São Paulo
Attendance: 0
Referee: Luis Flavio De Oliveira

30 July 2020
19:00 UTC-03:00

Red Bull Bragantino	0–2	Corinthians
	Report	Éderson 1'; Jô 65'

Morumbi, São Paulo
Attendance: 0
Referee: Raphael Claus

30 July 2020
21:30 UTC-03:00

Santos	1–3	Ponte Preta
Marinho 6'	Report	Rodrigues 50'; Moisés 61'; João Paulo 88'

Vila Belmiro, Santos
Attendance: 0
Referee: Salim Fende Chavez

== Semi-finals ==
Team 1	Score	Team 2
Corinthians (Brazil)	1–0	(Brazil) Mirassol
Palmeiras (Brazil)	1–0	(Brazil) Ponte Preta

2 August 2020
16:00 UTC-03:00

Corinthians	1–0	Mirassol
Éderson 72'	Report

Arena Corinthians, São Paulo
Attendance: 0
Referee: Vinicius Gonçalves Dias Araujo
2 August 2020
19:00 UTC-03:00

Palmeiras	1–0	Ponte Preta
Patrick 45+1'	Report

Allianz Parque, São Paulo
Attendance: 0
Referee: Flavio Rodrigues de Souza

== Finals ==
Team 1	Agg.	Team 2	1st leg	2nd leg
Corinthians (Brazil)	1–1 (3–4 p)	(Brazil) Palmeiras	0–0	1–1

=== First leg ===
5 August 2020
21:30 UTC-03:00

Corinthians	0–0	Palmeiras
	Report

Arena Corinthians, São Paulo
Attendance: 0
Referee: Raphael Claus

=== Second leg ===
8 August 2020
16:30 UTC-03:00

Palmeiras	1–1	Corinthians
Luiz Adriano 48'	Report	Jô 90+5'
Penalties
Bruno Henrique (penalty missed); Raphael Veiga (penalty scored); Scarpa (penalty scored); Lucas Lima (penalty scored); Patrick (penalty scored)	4–3	(penalty missed) Michel; (penalty scored) Abelar; (penalty missed) Cantillo; (penalty scored) Sidcley; (penalty scored) Jô

Allianz Parque, São Paulo
Attendance: 0
Referee: Luiz Flávio de Oliveira
