= Leandro Sena =

Brazilian football manager

Personal information
- Full name: Leandro Ribeiro Sena
- Date of birth: 8 August 1976 (age 50)
- Place of birth: São João da Barra, Brazil
- Height: 1.76 m (5 ft 9 in)
- Position: Defensive midfielder

Senior career*
Years	Team	Apps	(Gls)
1998	America-RJ		
1999	Araçatuba		
1999	Mirassol		
1999–2000	Mérida	29	(5)
2000–2001	Osasuna	4	(0)
2001–2003	Elche	44	(1)
2004	Ituano		
2004	Goytacaz		
2005	Americano		
2005–2007	América de Natal		
2008	Volta Redonda	5	(1)
2008	Treze		
2008	ABC		
2008	Vila Aurora		
2008–2009	Al-Raed		
2009	Alecrim		
2010	Americano		
2010	São João da Barra		

Managerial career
- 2013–2014: América de Natal
- 2014: Treze
- 2014: Icasa
- 2015: Globo
- 2017: Confiança
- 2018: Rio Claro
- 2019: ABC (assistant)
- 2020–2022: América de Natal (assistant)
- 2022: América de Natal (interim)
- 2022–2023: América de Natal
- 2023: Sergipe
- 2024: ASA
- 2024: CRAC
- 2024: Sousa
- 2025: União Rondonópolis
- 2025: Central
- 2025–2026: Joinville
- * Club domestic league appearances and goals

Leandro Ribeiro Sena (born 8 August 1976) is a Brazilian football coach and former player who played as a defensive midfielder.

== Career statistics ==
Appearances and goals by club, season and competition
Club	Season	League			National cup (Note: Includes Copa del Rey, Copa do Brasil.)		Total	
Club	Season	Division	Apps	Goals	Apps	Goals	Apps	Goals
Mérida	1999–2000	Segunda División	29	5	7	0	36	5
Osasuna	2000–01	La Liga	4	0	1	0	4	0
Elche CF	2001–02	Segunda División	21	0	1	0	22	0
Elche CF	2001–02	Segunda División	23	1	0	0	23	1
Elche CF	Total		44	1	1	0	45	1
América-RN	2007	Série A	25	3			25	3
Career total								

== Honours ==
=== Player ===
América de Natal

- Copa RN: 2006

=== Coach ===
Confiança

- Campeonato Sergipano: 2017

América de Natal

- Campeonato Brasileiro Série D: 2022
