= Coquinho =

Brazilian footballer (born 1980)

Personal information
- Full name: Luiz Oliveira dos Santos Junior
- Date of birth: January 21, 1980 (age 46)
- Place of birth: Luziânia, Brazil
- Height: 1.82 m (6 ft 0 in)
- Position: Defensive midfielder

Team information
- Current team: CRAC

Senior career*
| Years | Team | Apps | (Gls) |
| 2000–2004 | Luziânia | ? | (?) |
| 2005 | Atlético Goianiense | ? | (?) |
| 2006–2011 | Brasiliense | ? | (?) |
| 2010 | → Fortaleza (Loan) | ? | (?) |
| 2011–2012 | Itumbiara | 2 | (0) |
| 2012 | → Sobradinho (Loan) | 6 | (0) |
| 2013– | CRAC | | |
- * Club domestic league appearances and goals as of October 16, 2010

Luiz Oliveira dos Santos Junior (born January 21, 1980), known as Coquinho, is a Brazilian footballer who plays as a defensive midfielder for CRAC.

== Career ==
In 2010 Coquinho played for the Fortaleza on loan from Brasiliense. In July 2011, he moved to Itumbiara Esporte Clube.
