= Carlos Rabello =

Brazilian football manager (born 1964)

Personal information
- Full name: Carlos Fernando Rabello Barbosa
- Date of birth: 28 May 1964 (age 62)
- Place of birth: Tambaú, Brazil

Senior career*
Years	Team	Apps	(Gls)
1981	União Tambaú		
1983	Votuporanguense		

Managerial career
- 1988: XV de Piracicaba (assistant)
- 1996: Novorizontino U20
- 1996: Novorizontino
- 1997: Sãocarlense
- 1998: Novorizontino
- 1999: Ferroviária
- 1999: Rio Branco-SP
- 2000: União São João U20
- 2001: Ferroviária
- 2001: Inter de Bebedouro
- 2002: Araçatuba
- 2002: Palmeiras U20
- 2003: Taquaritinga
- 2003: Bragantino
- 2003–2004: Comercial-SP
- 2005: São Bento
- 2005: Ituano
- 2005–2006: Atlético Sorocaba
- 2006: Mirassol
- 2006: Atlético Goianiense
- 2007: Guaratinguetá
- 2007: Atlético Sorocaba
- 2007: Coruripe
- 2008: América de Natal
- 2008: São Bento
- 2008: Rio Branco-SP
- 2009: Ferroviária
- 2009: Taquaritinga
- 2010: União Barbarense
- 2010: Taquaritinga
- 2011: Sertãozinho
- 2011: CRB
- 2012: Coruripe
- 2012: Bacabal
- 2012: Rio Branco-SP
- 2015: Sergipe
- 2016: Galícia
- 2016: Jacuipense
- 2016: Marília
- 2017: Operário-MS
- 2017: Juazeirense
- 2018: Ferroviário
- 2018: Jequié
- 2018: ASA
- 2019: Jequié
- 2019: Juazeirense
- 2020: CRAC
- 2020: Juazeirense
- 2021: CRAC
- 2021: Juazeirense
- 2022: Altos
- 2023: Juazeirense
- 2023: Galícia
- 2024: Juazeirense
- 2024: Altos
- 2025: Baraúnas
- 2025: Juazeirense
- 2025: Barcelona de Ilhéus
- * Club domestic league appearances and goals

Carlos Fernando Rabello Barbosa (born 28 May 1964) is a Brazilian football coach and former player.

== Playing career ==
Born in Tambaú, São Paulo, Rabello had a short playing career, representing hometown side União Tambaú and Votuporanguense.

== Managerial career ==
Rabello started working as a fitness coach in his hometown side União in 1988, and became a manager in 1996, with Novorizontino's under-20 side. In May of that year, he was named in charge of the latter's first team.

Rabello subsequently managed Sãocarlense in 1997, but returned to Novorizontino in the following year. In the following years, he worked for teams in his native state, such as Ferroviária (two stints), Rio Branco-SP, União São João (under-20s), Inter de Bebedouro, Araçatuba, Palmeiras (under-20s), Taquaritinga, Bragantino, Comercial-SP, São Bento, Ituano, Atlético Sorocaba and Mirassol.

In July 2006, Rabello had a short stint at Atlético Goianiense before returning to São Paulo and taking over Guaratinguetá for the 2007 campaign. Dismissed in February, he was also in charge of Atlético Sorocaba during that year, and was named manager of Coruripe on 2 July.

Rabello was appointed América de Natal manager for the 2008 season, but was sacked on 30 January. He then subsequently returned to former sides São Bento, Rio Branco-SP, Ferroviária and Taquaritinga before being named in charge of União Barbarense for the 2010 season. Dismissed in January, he returned to Taquaritinga.

Rabello began the 2011 season in charge of Sertãozinho, and was appointed CRB manager on 6 February. Sacked on 17 March, he subsequently returned to Coruripe, but was dismissed from the latter club in January 2012.

In August 2012, after a short period at Bacabal, Rabello was announced back at Rio Branco-SP, but left in September as the club was knocked out of the Copa Paulista. He agreed to become the manager of Ríver in January 2013, but the deal was later cancelled as the club hired Edson Porto.

On 12 December 2014, after working as a coordinator, Rabello was announced as manager of Sergipe for the ensuing campaign. He was sacked on 15 March 2015, and took over Galícia the following 26 January.

Rabello left Galícia in March 2016 and was named at the helm of Jacuipense, but resigned from the latter after a few days in charge, and joined Marília. He was named manager of Operário-MS for the 2017 season, but left in January, and later led Juazeirense to a first-ever promotion to the Série C.

Rabello left Juazeirense in October 2017, and subsequently took over Ferroviário shortly after. He left the club on a mutual agreement on 28 January 2018, and was appointed at ASA on 4 April, after a short period at Jequié.

Rabello left ASA on 24 May 2018, and subsequently returned to Jequié, where he was sacked on 11 February 2019. He then returned to Juazeirense, but was relieved of his duties on 2 July 2019.

In October 2019, Rabello was appointed CRAC manager. He left in July 2020 to return to Juazeirense, and then returned to CRAC for 2021 season.

Sacked by CRAC on 16 March 2021, and returned to Juazeirense on 30 May, but resigned on 20 September.

On 11 February 2022, Rabello replaced Evandro Guimarães in charge of Altos. On 10 April, after just one match in the 2022 Série C, he was sacked.
