= Clube Recreativo e Atlético Catalano =

Brazilian football team

CRAC
- Full name: Clube Recreativo e Atlético Catalano
- Nicknames: Leão do Sul; Cracão
- Founded: 13 July 1931; 95 years ago
- Ground: Genervino da Fonseca, Catalão, Brazil
- Capacity: 12,000
- President: Batista Inácio
- Head coach: Leandro Sena
- League: Campeonato Brasileiro Série D Campeonato Goiano
- 2025: Goiano, 5th of 12
- Website: www.cracnet.com.br
Home colors	Away colors

Clube Recreativo e Atlético Catalano, also known as CRAC, is a Brazilian football team from Catalão, Goiás. They play the fourth level national league Campeonato Brasileiro Série D.

== History ==
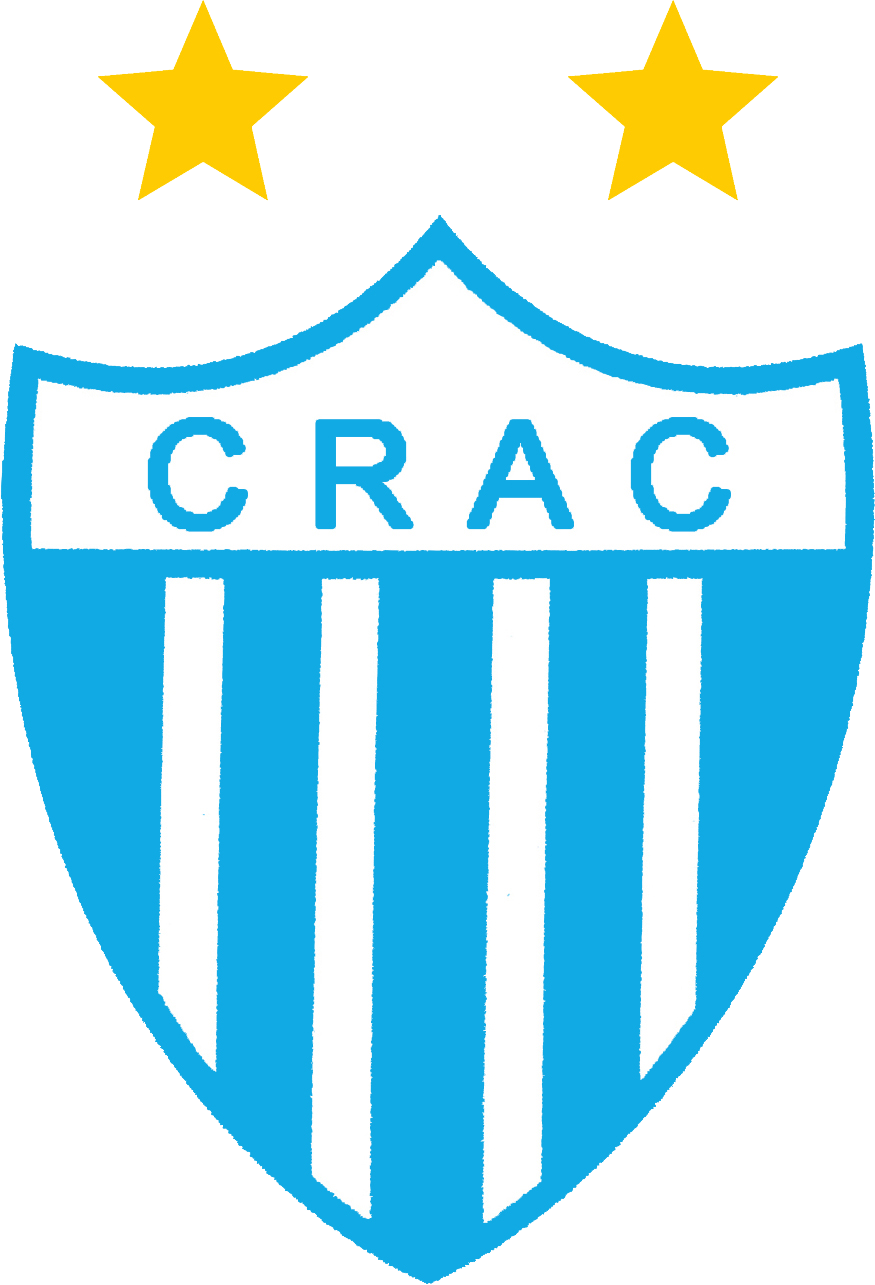
Logo used until November 2025

Clube Recreativo e Atlético Catalano were founded on July 13, 1931. The club won their first title, which was the Campeonato Goiano, in 1967, winning the competition for a second time in 2004. The club competed for the first time in the Série C in 2004, when they were eliminated in the third stage of the competition by Americano. CRAC competed in the Copa do Brasil in 2005, when they were eliminated in the first stage by Guarani. The club competed again in the Série C in 2007, finishing that year in the fifth place in the final stage. CRAC competed in the Série D in 2009 and the club were promoted to the Série C after finishing as runners-up for the 2012 season. In the 2026 season, CRAC experienced mixed results across state and national campaigns. In the 2026 Campeonato Goiano, the club progressed past the regular season to the quarter-finals, where they drew 1–1 at home against Goiás Esporte Clube before suffering a 4–1 away defeat at the Estádio Hailé Pinheiro to face elimination. CRAC subsequently played in the state classification bracket, finishing their local run against Jataiense. In the national 2026 Campeonato Brasileiro Série D, the team successfully advanced through the regionalized group stage. They defeated Tombense in the Round of 64 (1–0 at home, 0–0 away). However, their campaign concluded in July during the Round of 32 against Treze Futebol Clube. Despite a 2–1 home win in the first leg, a 1–0 away loss in the return fixture leveled the aggregate score to 2–2, and CRAC was ultimately eliminated 4–3 in a penalty shootout.

== Colors and badge ==
The club's color is sky blue. The CRAC badge has two stars, representing the two Campeonato Goiano titles won by the club in 1967 and in 2004.

== Stadium ==
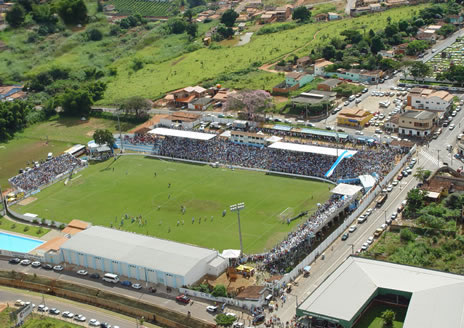
CRAC's home stadium.

CRAC play their home games at Estádio Genervino da Fonseca. The stadium has a maximum capacity of 12,000 people.

== Current squad ==
As of November 2021 Note: Flags indicate national team as defined under FIFA eligibility rules; some limited exceptions apply. Players may hold more than one non-FIFA nationality.

No.	Pos.	Nation	Player
—	GK	BRA	Alex
—	GK	BRA	Dudú
—	GK	BRA	Gott
—	GK	BRA	João Pedro
—	DF	BRA	Alan Silva
—	DF	BRA	Anelka
—	DF	BRA	Guerra
—	DF	BRA	Luis Fernando
—	DF	BRA	Marcelo Tchê
—	DF	BRA	Rafael Morisco
—	DF	BRA	Ronaldo Trevisan
—	DF	BRA	Tales
—	DF	BRA	Wallace

No.	Pos.	Nation	Player
—	MF	BRA	Alexandre
—	MF	BRA	Assis
—	MF	BRA	Coquinho
—	MF	BRA	Everton
—	MF	BRA	Hélder
—	MF	BRA	Marielson
—	MF	BRA	Paulinho
—	MF	BRA	Pituca
—	MF	BRA	Rafael Sayão
—	MF	BRA	Zé Neto
—	FW	BRA	Danilo Lins
—	FW	BRA	Renatinho

== Honours ==
=== National ===
- Campeonato Brasileiro Série D
  - Runners-up (1): 2012

=== State ===
- Campeonato Goiano
  - Winners (2): 1967, 2004
  - Runners-up (2): 1969, 1997
- Campeonato Goiano Second Division
  - Winners (4): 1965, 1998, 2001, 2003

== Managers ==
- (Brazil) Wanderley Paiva (2004)
- (Brazil) Vica (2005)
- (Brazil) Gilberto Pereira (2007–2008)
- (Brazil) Evair (2009)
- (Brazil) Ney da Matta (2010)
- (Brazil) Wanderley Paiva (2011–2012)
- (Brazil) Evair (2012)
- (Brazil) Lucho Nizzo (2012)
- (Brazil) Arturzinho (2013)
- (Brazil) Wanderley Paiva (2013)
- (Brazil) Hemerson Maria (2013)
- (Brazil) Moisés Egert (2014)
- (Brazil) Lucho Nizzo (2015)
- (Brazil) Júlio Sérgio (2015–2016)
- (Brazil) Jairo Araújo (2016)
- (Brazil) Alexandre Barroso (2017)
- (Brazil) Lucho Nizzo (2017)
- (Brazil) Ney da Matta (2019)
- (Brazil) Carlos Rabello (2020)
- (Brazil) Lucas Andrade (2021)
- (Brazil) Carlos Rabello (2021)
- (Brazil) Wilson Gottardo (2022)
- (Brazil) Paulo Massaro (2023)
- (Japan) Wagner Lopes (2024)
- (Brazil) Leandro Sena (2024–present)
