= 2020 Campeonato Paulista =

Campeonato Paulista - Série A1
- Season: 2020
- Dates: 22 January – 8 August
- Teams: 16
- Champions: Palmeiras
- Relegated: Água Santa; Oeste
- Matches: 110
- Goals: 239 (2.17 per match)
- Top goalscorer: Ytalo (7 goals)
- Biggest home win: Palmeiras 4–0 Oeste
- Biggest away win: Botafogo 0–6 Mirassol (3 February)
- Highest scoring: Botafogo 0–6 Mirassol (3 February); Oeste 1–5 Ferroviária (1 February)
- Highest attendance: 44,208; São Paulo 0–0 Corinthians (15 February)
- Lowest attendance: 405; Oeste 3–0 Botafogo (13 March)
- Total attendance: 584,662
- Average attendance: 7,593

The 2020 Campeonato Paulista de Futebol Profissional da Primeira Divisão - Série A1 was the 119th season of São Paulo's top professional football league.

== Format ==
- In the first stage the sixteen teams were drawn, with seeding, into four groups of four teams each, with each team playing once against the twelve clubs from the other three groups. After each team had played twelve matches, the top two teams of each group qualified for the quarter-final stage.
- After the completion of the first stage, the two clubs with the lowest number of points, regardless of the group, were relegated to the Campeonato Paulista Série A2.
- Quarter-finals, semi-finals and finals were played in a two-legged home and away fixture, with the best placed first stage team playing the second leg at home.
- In case of a draw in any knockout stage match, the winner was decided via a penalty shoot-out.
- The two highest-placed teams not otherwise qualified qualified for the 2021 Copa do Brasil.
- The top three highest-placed teams in the general table at the end of the competition who were not playing in any level of the national Brazilian football league system qualified for the 2021 Campeonato Brasileiro Série D.

=== Tiebreakers ===
The teams were ranked according to points (3 points for a win, 1 point for a draw, 0 points for a loss). If two or more teams were equal on points on completion of the group matches, the following criteria were applied to determine the rankings:

1. Higher number of wins;
2. Superior goal difference;
3. Higher number of goals scored;
4. Fewest red cards received;
5. Fewest yellow cards received;
6. Draw in the headquarters of the FPF.

== Teams ==
Club	Home city	Manager	2019 result
Água Santa	Diadema	(Brazil) Toninho Cecílio	3rd (Série A2)
Botafogo	Ribeirão Preto	(Brazil) Claudinei Oliveira	12th
Corinthians	São Paulo (Tatuapé)	(Brazil) Tiago Nunes	1st
Ferroviária	Araraquara	(Brazil) Sérgio Soares	7th
Guarani	Campinas	(Brazil) Thiago Carpini	10th
Inter de Limeira	Limeira	(Brazil) Elano	2nd (Série A2)
Ituano	Itu	(Brazil) Vinícius Bergantin	8th
Mirassol	Mirassol	(Brazil) Ricardo Catalá	13th
Novorizontino	Novo Horizonte	(Brazil) Roberto Fonseca	6th
Oeste	Itápolis	(Brazil) Renan Freitas	11th
Palmeiras	São Paulo (Perdizes)	(Brazil) Vanderlei Luxemburgo	3rd
Ponte Preta	Campinas	(Brazil) João Brigatti	9th
Red Bull Bragantino	Bragança Paulista	(Brazil) Felipe Conceição	14th
Santo André	Santo André	(Brazil) Paulo Roberto Santos	1st (Série A2)
Santos	Santos	(Portugal) Jesualdo Ferreira	4th
São Paulo	São Paulo (Morumbi)	(Brazil) Fernando Diniz	2nd

Red Bull took over Clube Atlético Bragantino, which resulted in the relegation of Red Bull Brasil to the second tier. Água Santa was awarded the qualification to Série A1
Source: Regulamento do Paulistão 2020

== First stage ==
=== Group A ===
Pos	Team	Pld	W	D	L	GF	GA	GD	Pts	Qualification or relegation
1	Santos	12	4	4	4	13	12	+1	16	Knockout stage
2	Ponte Preta	12	4	1	7	14	16	−2	13	Knockout stage
3	Água Santa (R)	12	2	5	5	7	15	−8	11	Relegation to Série A2
4	Oeste (R)	12	3	1	8	8	24	−16	10	Relegation to Série A2

Source: Soccerway
(R) Relegated

=== Group B ===
Pos	Team	Pld	W	D	L	GF	GA	GD	Pts	Qualification or relegation
1	Palmeiras	12	6	4	2	17	6	+11	22	Knockout stage
2	Santo André	12	6	2	4	14	13	+1	20	Knockout stage
3	Novorizontino	12	4	7	1	12	8	+4	19	
4	Botafogo	12	3	2	7	9	23	−14	11	

Source: Soccerway

=== Group C ===
Pos	Team	Pld	W	D	L	GF	GA	GD	Pts	Qualification or relegation
1	São Paulo	12	6	3	3	19	11	+8	21	Knockout stage
2	Mirassol	12	4	5	3	16	11	+5	17	Knockout stage
3	Inter de Limeira	12	4	2	6	8	15	−7	14	
4	Ituano	12	3	5	4	11	14	−3	14	

Source: Soccerway

=== Group D ===
Pos	Team	Pld	W	D	L	GF	GA	GD	Pts	Qualification or relegation
1	Red Bull Bragantino	12	7	2	3	18	9	+9	23	Knockout stage
2	Corinthians	12	4	5	3	15	10	+5	17	Knockout stage
3	Guarani	12	4	4	4	16	14	+2	16	
4	Ferroviária	12	3	6	3	13	9	+4	15	

Source: Soccerway

== Knockout stage ==
=== Bracket ===
Quarterfinals
A1	Santos	1
A2	Ponte Preta	3
B1	Palmeiras	2
B2	Santo André	0
C1	São Paulo	2
C2	Mirassol	3
D1	Red Bull Bragantino	0
D2	Corinthians	2

Semifinals
A2	Ponte Preta	0
B1	Palmeiras	1
C2	Mirassol	0
D2	Corinthians	1

Finals
B1	Palmeiras (p)	0	1	1 (4)
D2	Corinthians	0	1	1 (3)

== Overall table ==
Pos	Team	Pld	W	D	L	GF	GA	GD	Pts	Qualification or relegation
1	Palmeiras (C)	16	8	6	2	21	7	+14	30	Finalists
2	Corinthians	16	6	7	3	19	11	+8	25	Finalists
3	Mirassol (B)	14	5	5	4	19	14	+5	20	Eliminated in the semi-finals
4	Ponte Preta	14	5	1	8	17	18	−1	16	Eliminated in the semi-finals
5	Red Bull Bragantino	13	7	2	4	18	11	+7	23	Eliminated in the quarter-finals
6	São Paulo	13	6	3	4	21	14	+7	21	Eliminated in the quarter-finals
7	Santo André (B)	13	6	2	5	14	15	−1	20	Eliminated in the quarter-finals
8	Santos	13	4	4	5	14	15	−1	16	Eliminated in the quarter-finals
9	Novorizontino (B)	12	4	7	1	12	8	+4	19	
10	Guarani	12	4	4	4	16	14	+2	16	
11	Ferroviária	12	3	6	3	13	9	+4	15	
12	Inter de Limeira	12	4	2	6	8	15	−7	14	
13	Ituano	12	3	5	4	11	14	−3	14	
14	Botafogo	12	3	2	7	9	23	−14	11	
15	Água Santa (R)	12	2	5	5	7	15	−8	11	Relegation to Série A2
16	Oeste (R)	12	3	1	8	8	24	−16	10	Relegation to Série A2

Source: Soccerway
Rules for classification: 1st points; 2nd wins; 3rd goal difference; 4th goals scored; 5th head-to-head results; 6th least red cards received; 7th least yellow cards received; 8th draw.
(B) Qualification for the Campeonato Brasileiro Série D; (C) Champions; (R) Relegated

== Awards ==
=== Team of the Year ===
Pos.	Player	Club
GK	(Brazil) Cássio	Corinthians
DF	(Brazil) Fagner	Corinthians
DF	(Brazil) Felipe Melo	Palmeiras
DF	(Brazil) Gil	Corinthians
DF	(Brazil) Edimar	Red Bull Bragantino
MF	(Brazil) Patrick	Palmeiras
MF	(Brazil) Dani Alves	São Paulo
MF	(Brazil) João Paulo	Ponte Preta
FW	(Venezuela) Yeferson Soteldo	Santos
FW	(Brazil) Willian	Palmeiras
FW	(Brazil) Artur	Red Bull Bragantino
Manager	(Brazil) Vanderlei Luxemburgo	Palmeiras
Manager	(Brazil) Ricardo Catalá	Mirassol

Player of the Year

The Player of the Year was awarded to Artur of Red Bull Bragantino.

Young Player of the Year

The Young Player of the Year was awarded to Patrick of Palmeiras.

Countryside Best Player of the Year

The Countryside Best Player of the Year was awarded to Artur of Red Bull Bragantino.

Top Scorer of the Season

The top scorer of the season was Ytalo, who scored seven goals for Red Bull Bragantino.

== Top scorers ==
Rank	Player	Club	Goals
1	(Brazil) Ytalo	Red Bull Bragantino	7
2	(Brazil) Júnior Todinho	Guarani	6
2	(Brazil) Willian	Palmeiras	6
2	(Brazil) Pablo	São Paulo	6
2	(Brazil) Murilo Rangel	Inter de Limeira	6
6	(Brazil) Camilo	Mirassol	5
6	(Argentina) Mauro Boselli	Corinthians	5
6	(Brazil) Ronaldo	Santo André	5
