= Wanderley Paiva =

Brazilian footballer (1946–2023)

Personal information
- Full name: Wanderley Paiva Monteiro
- Date of birth: 7 April 1946
- Place of birth: Três Corações, Minas Gerais, Brazil
- Date of death: 27 November 2023 (aged 77)
- Place of death: Campinas, São Paulo, Brazil
- Height: 1.76 m (5 ft 9 in)
- Position: Defensive midfielder

Youth career
- 1965: Atlético de Três Corações

Senior career*
| Years | Team | Apps | (Gls) |
| 1966–1975 | Atlético Mineiro | | |
| 1975–1976 | América-SP | | |
| 1976–1980 | Ponte Preta | | |
| 1980 | Palmeiras | | |
| 1981 | Londrina | | |
| 1981 | Comercial | | |

International career
| 1968–1975 | Brazil | 7 | (0) |

Managerial career
- 1983: São José-SP
- 1984: Comercial-SP
- 1985: Joinville
- 1985: Comercial-SP
- 1988: América-SP
- 1989: Ferroviário
- 1990: Matsubara
- 1991: Londrina
- 1992: Juventus-SP
- 1993: Londrina
- 1994: Ponte Preta
- 1994: Patrocinense
- 1995: Juventus-SP
- 1995: Figueirense
- 1996: Inter de Limeira
- 1996: Ponte Preta
- 1997: Comercial-SP
- 1997: Inter de Limeira
- 1998: Vila Nova
- 1999: Inter de Limeira
- 1999: Ponta Grossa
- 1999: Matonense
- 1999–2000: Vila Nova
- 2000: Londrina
- 2001: Joinville
- 2001: Gama
- 2002: Marília
- 2003: Juventus-SP
- 2003: Anapolina
- 2004: CRAC
- 2006: São Raimundo
- 2006–2007: Ponte Preta
- 2007: União São João
- 2007: Roma Apucarana
- 2008: ASA
- 2008: Anápolis
- 2009: Corinthians Alagoano
- 2009: Ponte Preta
- 2009: Nacional-AM
- 2011–2013: CRAC
- * Club domestic league appearances and goals

Wanderley Paiva Monteiro (7 April 1946 – 27 November 2023), commonly known as Wanderley Paiva or as Vanderlei Paiva, was a Brazilian professional football coach and player. He was a defensive midfielder who played mostly for Atlético Mineiro, and also represented the Brazil national team at international level. Paiva won the Bola de Prata in 1971.

== Club career ==
Wanderley Paiva was born in Três Corações, in the state of Minas Gerais, and in his youth he played for local side Atlético. After refusing an offer from Rio de Janeiro (state)'s Olaria, he was contacted and signed by Atlético Mineiro in 1966. With the Belo Horizonte club, Paiva became a first-team regular, and was part of the squad which won the first Campeonato Brasileiro Série A in 1971. He played 27 matches and scored one goal in that season, and was selected for the team of the tournament, winning the Bola de Prata, awarded by Placar magazine. Wanderley scored Atlético Mineiro's first goal in an official international competition in 1972, and was the second player with the most appearances for the club, with 559.

In 1975, he left Atlético and joined América de São José do Rio Preto, where he remained until 1976. He then moved to Ponte Preta, with which he was runner-up of the Campeonato Paulista in 1977. He played for Ponte Preta until 1980, when he was signed by Palmeiras, where he stayed for just one season, appearing 19 times and scoring one goal. Wanderley then moved to Londrina, and subsequently to Comercial from Ribeirão Preto, where he ended his career.

== International career ==
Paiva was first capped for the Brazil national team on 19 December 1968, when Atlético Mineiro represented the Seleção against Yugoslavia and won 3–2. He only returned to the national side in 1975, when he was called up for that year's Copa América, in which he played six games, as Brazil finished in third place.

== Managerial career ==
After retiring from playing, Wanderley Paiva became manager of the Ponte Preta youth squads. In the 2000s, he coached professional sides Juventus, CRAC, Ponte Preta, União São João and Corinthians Alagoano. His best season was in 2004 with CRAC, when he led the club to victory in the Campeonato Goiano, the state league of Goiás, for the second time in its history.

== Death ==
Paiva died from prostate cancer in Campinas, on 27 November 2023, at the age of 77.

== Honours ==
=== Player ===
Atlético Mineiro

- Campeonato Brasileiro Série A: 1971
- Campeonato Mineiro: 1970

Individual

- Bola de Prata: 1971

=== Manager ===
CRAC

- Campeonato Goiano: 2004
