= Hélder (footballer, born 1991) =

Brazilian footballer

Personal information
- Full name: Hélder Ribeiro Silva
- Date of birth: 1 August 1991 (age 35)
- Place of birth: Nova Canaã do Norte, Brazil
- Height: 1.80 m (5 ft 11 in)
- Position: Midfielder

Team information
- Current team: CRAC

Youth career
- Atlético Mineiro
- Amparense
- Itaúna
- Cabofriense
- –2010: Náutico

Senior career*
Years	Team	Apps	(Gls)
2010–2018	Náutico	17	(0)
2011	→ CA Porto (loan)	0	(0)
2012	→ Ypiranga (loan)	8	(0)
2013	→ Salgueiro (loan)	0	(0)
2014	→ Central (loan)	1	(0)
2015	→ Evangélica (loan)		
2016	→ Anápolis (loan)	0	(0)
2016	→ Slaven Belupo (loan)	2	(0)
2017	→ Anápolis (loan)	5	(0)
2018	→ Boa Esporte (loan)	0	(0)
2019	Luverdense	0	(0)
2020–	CRAC	0	(0)
- * Club domestic league appearances and goals as of 21:11, 29 March 2019 (UTC)

Hélder Ribeiro Silva (born 1 August 1991), commonly known as Hélder, is a Brazilian footballer who plays as a midfielder for CRAC.

== Club career ==
Hélder started his career at Atlético Mineiro, but would spend time with Amparense, Itaúna and Cabofriense before settling at Náutico.

After notching up 9 Série A appearances in 2013, Hélder was hopeful he would be able to secure his place in the first team. However, he was loaned to Central in 2014 alongside fellow Náutico player João Paulo. Neither spent much time at the Caruaru-based side, with both returning less than two months later.

He was loaned to Croatian side Slaven Belupo in the summer of 2016.

== Career statistics ==
=== Club ===
As of 29 March 2019.

Club	Season	League			Cup		Other		Total	
Club	Season	Division	Apps	Goals	Apps	Goals	Apps	Goals	Apps	Goals
Náutico	2010	Série B	0	0	? (Note: Appearances in the Copa do Nordeste)	1	0	0	?	1
Náutico	2011	Série B	2	0	0	0	0	0	2	0
Náutico	2012	Série A	0	0	0	0	2 (Note: Appearances in the Campeonato Pernambucano)	0	2	0
Náutico	2013	Série A	9	0	0	0	0	0	-	0
Náutico	2014	Série B	5	0	1	0	1	0	7	0
Náutico	2015	Série B	0	0	5 (Note: One appearance in the Copa do Brasil, four appearances in the Copa do Nordeste)	0	4	0	9	0
Náutico	2016	Série B	1	0	0	0	0	0	1	0
Náutico	2017	Série B	0	0	0	0	0	0	0	0
Náutico	2018	Série C	0	0	0	0	0	0	0	0
Náutico	Total		17	0	7+	1	7	0	31+	1
CA Porto (loan)	2011	Série D	0	0	0	0	21	0	21	0
Ypiranga (loan)	2012	Série D	8	0	0	0	0	0	8	0
Salgueiro (loan)	2013	Série D	0	0	5	0	8	0	13	0
Central (loan)	2014	Série D	1	0	0	0	0	0	1	0
Anápolis (loan)	2016	Série D	0	0	0	0	16 (Note: Appearances in the Campeonato Goiano)	3	16	3
Slaven Belupo (loan)	2016–17	1. HNL	2	0	0	0	0	0	2	0
Anápolis (loan)	2017	Série D	5	0	0	0	11	0	16	0
Boa Esporte (loan)	2018	Série B	0	0	2 (Note: Appearances in the Copa do Brasil)	0	7 (Note: Appearances in the Campeonato Mineiro)	0	9	0
Luverdense	2019	Série C	0	0	2	0	0	0	2	0
Career total			33	0	16+	1	70	3	119+	4
