= 2022 Campeonato Paulista =

Campeonato Paulista - Série A1
- Season: 2022
- Dates: 23 January – 3 April 2022
- Teams: 16
- Champions: Palmeiras
- Relegated: Novorizontino; Ponte Preta
- Série D: Internacional de Limeria; Santo André; Ferroviária
- Matches: 104
- Goals: 246 (2.37 per match)
- Top goalscorer: Ronaldo Silva (9 goals)
- Biggest home win: Corinthians 5–0 Ponte Preta
- Biggest away win: Mirassol 0–3 São Paulo; Novorizontino 0–3 Red Bull Bragantino; Santos 0–3 São Paulo
- Highest scoring: Red Bull Bragantino 4–3 São Paulo
- Longest winning run: São Paulo (5 games)
- Longest unbeaten run: Palmeiras (14 games)
- Longest winless run: Novorizontino (All games)
- Longest losing run: Novorizontino (4 games)

The 2022 Campeonato Paulista de Futebol Profissional da Primeira Divisão - Série A1 was the 121st season of São Paulo's top professional football league. The competition was played from 23 January to 3 April 2022.

== Format ==
- In the first stage the sixteen seeded teams were drawn into four groups of four teams each, with each team playing once against the twelve clubs from the other three groups. After each team has played twelve matches, the top two teams of each group qualified for the quarter-final stage.
- After the completion of the first stage, the two clubs with the lowest number of points, regardless of the group, were relegated to the Campeonato Paulista Série A2.
- Quarter-finals and semi-finals were played in a single match, with the best placed team playing at home.
- The finals were played in a two-legged home and away fixture, with the best placed team playing the second leg at home.
- In case of a draw in any knockout stage, the match was decided by a penalty shoot-out.
- The two highest-placed teams not otherwise qualified qualified for the 2023 Copa do Brasil.
- The top three highest-placed teams in the general table at the end of the competition who are not playing in any level of the national Brazilian football league system qualified for the 2023 Campeonato Brasileiro Série D.

=== Tiebreakers ===
The teams are ranked according to points (3 points for a win, 1 point for a draw, 0 points for a loss). If two or more teams are equal on points on completion of the group matches, the following criteria are applied to determine the rankings:

1. Higher number of wins;
2. Superior goal difference;
3. Higher number of goals scored;
4. Fewest red cards received;
5. Fewest yellow cards received;
6. Draw in the headquarters of the FPF.

== TV partners ==
After several years being broadcast by Grupo Globo (TV Globo, SporTV and Premiere FC), the broadcasting rights of the 2022 Campeonato Paulista were acquired by Record TV, with their streaming app Play Plus also transmitting the matches live. Aside of that, the streaming platforms HBO Max and Estádio TNT Sports (owned by TNT) and the Paulistão official YouTube channel and app (Paulistão Play) also broadcast the matches live. Record and the YouTube channel will broadcast 16 matches of the competitions each, one for each round, while HBO Max and Estádio TNT will broadcast 28 matches each (24 in the first round, one quarterfinals match, one semifinals match and both finals). Paulistão Play will have an offer of all but 13 matches of the tournament (exclusive for HBO Max/Estádio TNT).

== Teams ==
Location of teams in 2022 Campeonato Paulista

Club	Home city	Manager	2021 result
Água Santa	Diadema	(Brazil) Serginho (caretaker)	2nd (Série A2)
Botafogo	Ribeirão Preto	(Brazil) Leandro Zago	14th
Corinthians	São Paulo (Tatuapé)	(Portugal) Vítor Pereira	3rd
Ferroviária	Araraquara	(Brazil) Elano	6th
Guarani	Campinas	(Brazil) Daniel Paulista	8th
Internacional de Limeira	Limeira	(Brazil) Vinicius Bergantin	7th
Ituano	Itu	(Brazil) Mazola Júnior	11th
Mirassol	Mirassol	(Brazil) Ivan Baitello (caretaker)	4th
Novorizontino	Novo Horizonte	(Brazil) Allan Aal	9th
Palmeiras	São Paulo (Perdizes)	(Portugal) Abel Ferreira	2nd
Ponte Preta	Campinas	(Brazil) Hélio dos Anjos	10th
Red Bull Bragantino	Bragança Paulista	(Brazil) Maurício Barbieri	5th
Santo André	Santo André	(Brazil) Thiago Carpini	13th
Santos	Santos	(Argentina) Fabián Bustos	12th
São Bernardo	São Bernardo do Campo	(Brazil) Márcio Zanardi	1st (Série A2)
São Paulo	São Paulo (Morumbi)	(Brazil) Rogério Ceni	1st

== First stage ==
=== Group A ===
Pos	Team	Pld	W	D	L	GF	GA	GD	Pts	Qualification or relegation
1	Corinthians	12	7	2	3	19	9	+10	23	Knockout stage
2	Guarani	12	4	2	6	12	17	−5	14	Knockout stage
3	Internacional de Limeira	12	3	5	4	14	16	−2	14	
4	Água Santa	12	3	2	7	11	15	−4	11	

Source: Soccerway

=== Group B ===
Pos	Team	Pld	W	D	L	GF	GA	GD	Pts	Qualification or relegation
1	São Paulo	12	7	2	3	18	10	+8	23	Knockout stage
2	São Bernardo	12	4	4	4	9	10	−1	16	Knockout stage
3	Ferroviária	12	3	5	4	15	17	−2	14	
4	Novorizontino	12	0	3	9	5	19	−14	3	Relegation to Série A2

Source: Soccerway

=== Group C ===
Pos	Team	Pld	W	D	L	GF	GA	GD	Pts	Qualification or relegation
1	Palmeiras	12	9	3	0	17	3	+14	30	Knockout stage
2	Ituano	12	5	4	3	19	12	+7	19	Knockout stage
3	Botafogo	12	5	3	4	10	12	−2	18	
4	Mirassol	12	4	5	3	17	17	0	17	

Source: Soccerway

=== Group D ===
Pos	Team	Pld	W	D	L	GF	GA	GD	Pts	Qualification or relegation
1	Red Bull Bragantino	12	6	2	4	19	13	+6	20	Knockout stage
2	Santo André	12	3	6	3	11	10	+1	15	Knockout stage
3	Santos	12	3	5	4	16	19	−3	14	
4	Ponte Preta	12	2	3	7	10	23	−13	9	Relegation to Série A2

Source: Soccerway

== Knockout stage ==
=== Bracket ===
Quarterfinals
C1	Palmeiras	2
C2	Ituano	0
D1	Red Bull Bragantino	1
D2	Santo André	0
B1	São Paulo	4
B2	São Bernardo	1
A1	Corinthians	1 (7)
A2	Guarani	1 (6)

Semifinals
C1	Palmeiras	2
D1	Red Bull Bragantino	1
B1	São Paulo	2
A1	Corinthians	1

Finals
C1	Palmeiras	1	4	5
B1	São Paulo	3	0	3

== Overall table ==
Pos	Team	Pld	W	D	L	GF	GA	GD	Pts	Qualification or relegation
1	Palmeiras (C)	16	12	3	1	26	7	+19	39	Finalists
2	São Paulo	16	10	2	4	27	17	+10	32	Finalists
3	Corinthians	14	7	3	4	21	12	+9	24	Eliminated in the semi-finals
4	Red Bull Bragantino	14	7	2	5	21	15	+6	23	Eliminated in the semi-finals
5	Ituano	13	5	4	4	19	14	+5	19	Eliminated in the quarter-finals
6	São Bernardo	13	4	4	5	10	14	−4	16	Eliminated in the quarter-finals
7	Guarani	13	4	3	6	13	18	−5	15	Eliminated in the quarter-finals
8	Santo André (Q)	13	3	6	4	11	11	0	15	Eliminated in the quarter-finals
9	Botafogo	12	5	3	4	10	12	−2	18	
10	Mirassol	12	4	5	3	17	17	0	17	
11	Ferroviária (Q)	12	3	5	4	15	17	−2	14	
12	Inter de Limeira (Q)	12	3	5	4	14	16	−2	14	
13	Santos	12	3	5	4	16	19	−3	14	
14	Água Santa	12	3	2	7	11	15	−4	11	
15	Ponte Preta (R)	12	2	3	7	10	23	−13	9	Relegation to Série A2
16	Novorizontino (R)	12	0	3	9	5	19	−14	3	Relegation to Série A2

Source: Soccerway
Rules for classification: 1st points; 2nd wins; 3rd goal difference; 4th goals scored; 5th head-to-head results; 6th least red cards received; 7th least yellow cards received; 8th draw.
(C) Champions; (Q) Qualification for the Campeonato Brasileiro Série D; (R) Relegated

== Top scorers ==
Rank	Player	Club	Goal
1	(Brazil) Ronaldo Silva	Inter de Limeira	9
2	(Argentina) Jonathan Calleri	São Paulo	8
3	(Brazil) Zeca	Mirassol	6
3	(Brazil) Lucca	Ponte Preta	6
