= Cristiano Bassoli =

Brazilian football manager

Personal information
- Full name: Cristiano Bassoli Souza
- Date of birth: 6 January 1983 (age 43)
- Place of birth: Passo Fundo, Brazil

Managerial career
- Years: Team
- 2011–2017: Diamante SC (youth)
- 2020–2021: Altos (assistant)
- 2021: Rio Branco-PR (assistant)
- 2022: 4 de Julho (assistant)
- 2022–2023: Altos (assistant)
- 2022: Altos (interim)
- 2022: Altos (interim)
- 2023: Altos
- 2024: Joinville U20
- 2025: ABC (assistant)

Cristiano Bassoli Souza (born 6 January 1983) is a Brazilian football coach.

== Career ==
Born in Passo Fundo, Rio Grande do Sul, Bassoli worked as a scout for Paraná before becoming a youth coach at Curitiba-based team Diamante Sport Club in 2011. In October 2019, he was included in Fernando Tonet's staff at Altos, being named his assistant.

Bassoli left Altos on 1 February 2021, and moved to Rio Branco-PR under the same role. On 10 November, he rejoined Tonet's staff at 4 de Julho, also as his assistant.

On 11 February 2022, Bassoli left 4 de Julho to return to Altos, being named Carlos Rabello's assistant. Two days later, he was the interim head coach of the club in a 4–0 Campeonato Piauiense home routing of Oeirense.

Back to his assistant role, Bassoli was again an interim in a 2–0 win over Parnahyba on 13 April 2022, after Rabello was sacked. He returned to his previous role in the following day, before being appointed head coach of the club on 24 July 2023, replacing Luan Carlos; unable to avoid relegation, he left on 8 September.
