= Estádio Municipal Felipe Raulino =

Multi-use stadium in Altos, Piauí, Brazil

Municipal Felipe Raulino
- Felipão
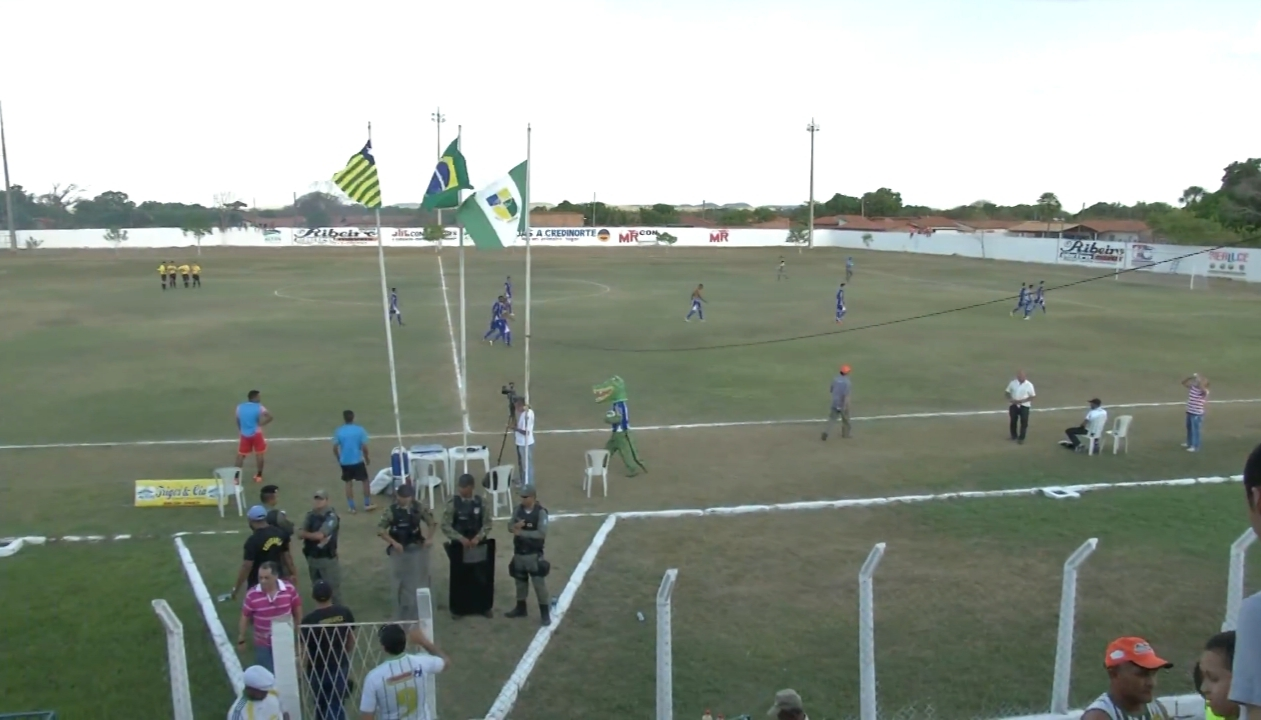
- Interactive map of Municipal Felipe Raulino
- Full name: Estádio Municipal Felipe Raulino
- Location: Altos, PI, Brazil
- Coordinates: 5.037970425871176°S 42.44538212292706°W
- Owner: City of Altos
- Operator: City of Altos
- Capacity: 4,000
- Surface: Natural grass
- Record attendance: 3,900 (Altos 2–1 Atlético Goianiense, 7 February 2018)
- Field size: 105 × 68 m

Construction
- Opened: 23 September 1992

Tenant
- Altos

Estádio Municipal Felipe Raulino, known as Felipão, is a multi-use stadium in Altos, Piauí, Brazil. It is used mostly for football matches, and has a maximum capacity of 4,000 people.

Inaugurated on 23 September 1992 in a match between a XIs from the city of Altos and Campo Maior, the stadium only had its official match on 26 September 2015, in a Campeonato Piauiense Série B match between Associação Atlética de Altos and Esporte Clube Timon. Their record attendance match occurred on 7 February 2018, in a Copa do Brasil home win for Altos over Atlético Goianiense.
