= University of Vassouras =

University in Brazil

- Universidade de Vassouras
- Former name: Universidade Severino Sombra
- Motto: Breaking Codes
- Type: Private
- Established: January 29, 1967
- Affiliations: FUSVE
- Chancellor: Marco Antonio Vaz Capute
- Rector: Marco Antonio Soares de Souza
- Location: Vassouras, Rio de Janeiro, Brazil; 22.4093°S 43.6641°W
- Campus: Urban
- Colors: Burgundy and Grey
- Website: www.universidadedevassouras.edu.br

The University of Vassouras (Portuguese: Universidade de Vassouras), formerly known as Universidade Severino Sombra, is a private university in Brazil, located in the city of Vassouras, in the state of Rio de Janeiro. It was founded on January 29, 1967.

It is a non-profit institution, maintained by Severino Sombra Educational Foundation (most known as FUSVE), established in 1967 in Vassouras. The recognition of the educational institution as a university took place in July 1997. It was founded by the politician, Brazilian federal congressman and military officer Gen. Severino Sombra.

The university exerts great influence on the landscape of the southern region of Rio de Janeiro. All of the university's facilities are located within a three-kilometer radius of each other, which aims to facilitate the movement of students between the buildings. The institution's campus is 120 kilometers from the state capital.

The university provides many laboratories, air-conditioned rooms, a library, a dental clinic, a veterinary clinic, and its own university hospital (the Vassouras University Hospital).

== Admission ==
For undergraduate admission to Univassouras two exams are used: ENEM and its own vestibular test.
