= Cristiano (footballer, born 1999) =

Brazilian footballer (born 1999)

Personal information
- Full name: Cristiano Pereira de Oliveira
- Date of birth: 3 April 1999 (age 27)
- Place of birth: Rio de Janeiro, Brazil
- Height: 1.78 m (5 ft 10 in)
- Position: Forward

Team information
- Current team: Pelotas

Youth career
- 2016: Cruzeiro-RS
- 2017–2020: Ceará

Senior career*
Years	Team	Apps	(Gls)
2019–2022	Ceará	11	(1)
2021	→ Confiança (loan)	20	(5)
2022	→ São José-RS (loan)	16	(8)
2022–2023	Iwate Grulla Morioka	17	(5)
2024	Volta Redonda	19	(3)
2025	Ypiranga-RS	27	(1)
2025–	Pelotas	6	(5)
- * Club domestic league appearances and goals as of 7 November 2025

Cristiano Pereira de Oliveira (born 3 April 1999), simply known as Cristiano, is a Brazilian professional footballer who plays as a forward for Pelotas.

== Career ==
Revealed by the youth sectors of Ceará, Cristiano was part of the champion squads of the Copa do Nordeste and the Brazilian Under-23 Championship in 2020. Without getting much space, he was later loaned to EC São José, where he stood out as the team's top scorer. He was traded to Iwate Grulla Morioka where he played for two seasons, returning to Brazil in 2024 to defend Volta Redonda. For the 2025 season, Cristiano signed with Ypiranga de Erechim. On September, Cristiano terminated his contract and signed with EC Pelotas.

== Honours ==
Ceará

- Copa do Nordeste: 2020
- Campeonato Brasileiro Sub-23: 2020

Volta Redonda

- Campeonato Brasileiro Série C: 2024
