= Ricardo Catalá =

Brazilian football manager (born 1982)

Personal information
- Full name: Ricardo Catalá Salgado Júnior
- Date of birth: 28 April 1982 (age 44)
- Place of birth: São Paulo, Brazil

Managerial career
- Years: Team
- 2005–2007: Europa (youth)
- 2008–2013: Audax U17
- 2014–2017: Red Bull Brasil (assistant)
- 2018: Red Bull Brasil
- 2019–2020: Mirassol
- 2020: Guarani
- 2021: São Bernardo
- 2021–2022: Operário Ferroviário
- 2022–2023: Mirassol
- 2023–2024: Remo
- 2024–2026: São Bernardo

Ricardo Catalá Salgado Júnior (born 28 April 1982) is a Brazilian professional football coach.

== Career ==
Of Catalan heritage, Catalá's first senior job was at CE Europa's Cadete A squad in 2005. He left the club in 2007, and joined Audax in the following year, being appointed in charge of the under-17s.

On 13 November 2013, Catalá joined Maurício Barbieri's staff as an assistant at Red Bull Brasil. On 11 October 2017, he was appointed as manager for the ensuing campaign, but was sacked the following 3 September after a run of poor results.

On 23 April 2019, Catalá was named at the helm of Mirassol. On 6 November, after reaching the semifinals of the year's Copa Paulista (the club's best-ever position in the tournament), he renewed his contract for a further year.

Catalá took Mirassol to the semifinals of the 2020 Campeonato Paulista, despite losing 18 first team players due to the COVID-19 pandemic. On 29 August, he replaced sacked Thiago Carpini at the helm of Guarani, but was himself dismissed on 7 October.

On 29 December 2020, Catalá was announced at the helm of São Bernardo. The following 1 October, after winning the Campeonato Paulista Série A2, he left the club and took over Operário Ferroviário in the second division.

On 19 March 2022, Catalá left Operário in a mutual agreement, and returned to Mirassol just hours later. He was dismissed from the latter on 4 May 2023, despite leading the side to the second division in the previous year.

On 25 May 2023, Catalá was appointed in charge of Remo in the third level. On 28 February 2024, after being knocked out in the first phase of the 2024 Copa do Brasil, he was sacked, and returned to São Bernardo on 3 April.

On 4 April 2024, Catalá returned to São Bernardo, leading the club to a first-ever promotion to the Série B in 2025. On 28 July 2026, however, he was dismissed after an eight-game winless streak.

== Honours ==
=== Club ===
São Bernardo

- Campeonato Paulista Série A2: 2021

Mirassol

- Campeonato Brasileiro Série C: 2022

=== Individual ===
- Campeonato Paulista Best Head Coach: 2020 (shared with Vanderlei Luxemburgo)
