= Ivan Baitello =

Brazilian footballer (born 1973)

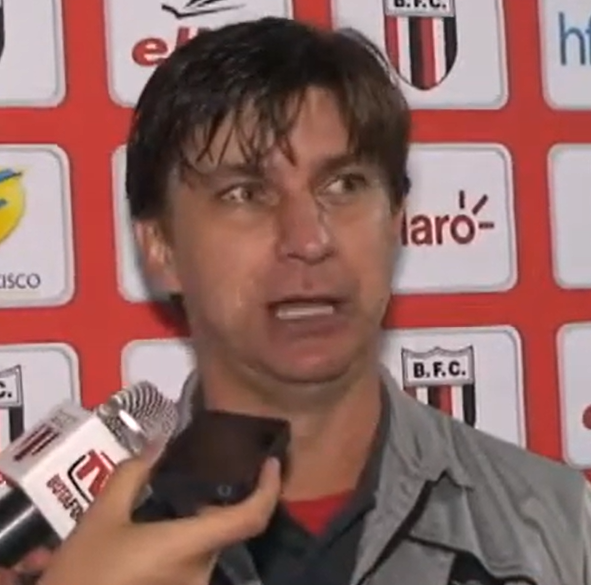
- Baitello in 2013

Personal information
- Full name: Ivan Lucas Baitello
- Date of birth: 16 July 1973 (age 53)
- Place of birth: São Paulo, Brazil
- Position: Defensive midfielder

Team information
- Current team: Mirassol (assistant)

Senior career*
Years	Team	Apps	(Gls)
- Mirassol
- Inter de Bebedouro
- Araçatuba
1995	União São João	9	(0)
1996	Chapecoense		
1997	América-SP		
1997–1998	Mirassol		
1999	Tuna Luso		

Managerial career
- 2000–2003: Mirassol U15
- 2004–2005: Mirassol (assistant)
- 2004: Mirassol (interim)
- 2005: Mirassol (interim)
- 2006–2007: São Caetano U20
- 2007–2010: São Caetano (assistant)
- 2010: São Caetano (interim)
- 2011–2013: Mirassol
- 2013: Botafogo-SP
- 2013: Oeste
- 2014: Atlético Sorocaba
- 2015: Capivariano
- 2020–: Mirassol (assistant)
- 2022: Mirassol (interim)
- 2025: Mirassol (interim)
- * Club domestic league appearances and goals

Ivan Lucas Baitello (born 16 July 1973) is a Brazilian football coach and former player who played as a defensive midfielder. He is the current football superintendent and assistant coach of Mirassol.

== Playing career ==
Born in São Paulo, Baitello began his career with Mirassol, and also represented Inter de Bebedouro, Araçatuba, União São João (featuring in two Série A matches in 1995), Chapecoense and América-SP before returning to Mirassol in 1997. He also played for Tuna Luso before retiring at the age of just 28, due to a spinal disc herniation.

== Coaching career ==
After retiring, Baitello joined Mirassol's youth setup in 2000, as an under-15 coach. He became an assistant of the main squad in 2004, being also an interim head coach on two occasions, before joining São Caetano ahead of the 2006 season, as the head coach of the under-20 side.

Baitello was an assistant of the Azulão from the 2007 season until 26 October 2010, when he was named head coach of his former side Mirassol. He opted to leave the club on 12 May 2013, to take over Série D side Botafogo-SP

Baitello left Bota on 25 August 2013, after only eight matches, as the club was knocked out from the national league. Two days later, he was named at the helm of Oeste in the Série B.

Baitello resigned from Oeste on 16 October 2013, and was named in charge of Atlético Sorocaba for the 2014 season. He left the latter club on 2 February of that year, and spent the entire season without coaching before taking over Capivariano on 28 October.

On 6 August 2015, Baitello returned to Mirassol, as a football superintendent. He subsequently began to work as an assistant coach of the club from the 2020 season onwards, before being named interim head coach on 3 March 2022, after the departure of Eduardo Baptista.

Baitello returned to his previous role after the arrival of Ricardo Catalá, and was again named interim on 21 February 2025, replacing Eduardo Barroca.
