= Camilo (footballer, born 9 March 1986) =

Brazilian footballer

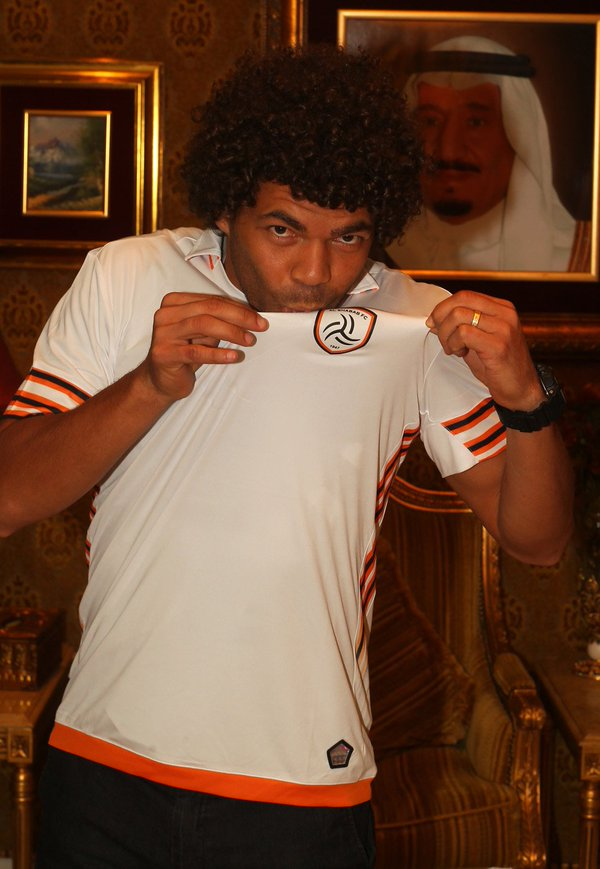

Personal information
- Full name: Fernando Camilo Faris de Souza
- Date of birth: 9 March 1986 (age 40)
- Place of birth: Rio de Janeiro, Brazil
- Height: 1.74 m (5 ft 8 1/2 in)
- Position: Attacking midfielder

Youth career
- 2000–2004: América-RJ
- 2004–2006: RS Futebol

Senior career*
Years	Team	Apps	(Gls)
2006–2008	Marília		
2008–2011	Cruzeiro	18	(0)
2009	→ Grêmio Barueri (loan)	2	(0)
2009	→ Santo André (loan)	9	(3)
2010	→ Ceará (loan)	17	(0)
2011	→ América Mineiro (loan)	3	(0)
2011	Nanchang Hengyuan	14	(2)
2012	Botafogo-SP	17	(3)
2012	Avaí	17	(0)
2013	Mirassol	18	(7)
2013	Sport	26	(3)
2014	Botafogo-SP	12	(2)
2014–2015	Chapecoense	66	(9)
2016	Al-Shabab	10	(1)
2016–2017	Botafogo	57	(7)
2017–2019	Internacional	51	(2)
2019	Chapecoense	28	(1)
2020	Mirassol	8	(5)
2020–2021	Ponte Preta	69	(10)
2022–2023	Mirassol	15	(7)

International career
2017	Brazil	1	(0)
- * Club domestic league appearances and goals as of 20:17, 30 May 2022 (UTC)

Fernando Camilo Farias (born 9 March 1986), simply known as Camilo, is a Brazilian former footballer who played as an attacking midfielder.

== Club career ==
After representing America-RJ and RS Futebol as a youth, Rio de Janeiro-born Camilo made his senior debut with Marília in 2006.

On 5 May 2008, after scoring five goals in the year's Campeonato Paulista, Camilo signed a three-year deal with Série A club Cruzeiro. He made his debut for the club on 4 September, coming on as a substitute for Ramires in a 3–1 away win against Vasco da Gama.

In May 2009 Camilo was loaned to fellow top tier club Grêmio Barueri, but had his loan cancelled early the following month. Another loan move to Primeira Liga side C.S. Marítimo followed, but the deal collapsed and on 26 August he was announced at Santo André, on a loan deal until the end of the year.

Camilo subsequently served loans at Ceará and América Mineiro before leaving Cruzeiro in 2011, after his contract expired. He subsequently signed for Nanchang Hengyuan in the Chinese Super League, but returned to Brazil on 19 January 2012 after joining Botafogo-SP.

On 12 August 2012, Camilo was presented at Avaí. After being sparingly used, he moved to Mirassol the following 12 December; with the latter he scored seven goals in only 18 matches during the 2013 Paulistão, including one in a 6–2 home routing of Palmeiras.

On 27 May 2013 Camilo joined Sport, contributing with three goals as his side achieved a top tier promotion. On 7 January of the following year, however, he returned to Botafogo-SP.

In April 2014, Camilo signed a short-term deal with Chapecoense for their first season in the main category. He became a mainstay in the club's midfield, and renewed his contract for a further year on 15 December.

On 24 September 2015, Camilo scored Chape's first international goal, netting the opener in a 1–1 away draw against Libertad. In December, he moved abroad for the first time in his career after signing for Al-Shabab.

In May 2016, Camilo rescinded with Al-Shabab, stating a desire to return to his homeland. Linked to his former club Chapecoense, he signed a three-year contract with Botafogo late in the month.

On 19 July 2017, Camilo transferred to Internacional. On 28 May 2019, he rescinded his contract, and returned to Chape two days later.

== International career ==
On 19 January 2017, Camilo was called up by Tite for a friendly against Colombia. He made his full international debut six days later, replacing goalscorer Dudu in the 1–0 win at the Engenhão in his hometown.

== Career statistics ==
=== Club ===
As of 30 May 2019

Club	Season	League			State League		Cup		Continental		Other		Total	
Club	Season	Division	Apps	Goals	Apps	Goals	Apps	Goals	Apps	Goals	Apps	Goals	Apps	Goals
Cruzeiro	2008	Série A	18	0	—		0	0	0	0	—		18	0
Cruzeiro	2009	Série A	0	0	4	0	0	0	—		—		4	0
Cruzeiro	2010	Série A	0	0	4	0	0	0	—		—		4	0
Cruzeiro	Subtotal		18	0	8	0	0	0	0	0	—		26	0
Grêmio Prudente (loan)	2009	Série A	2	0	—		—		—		—		2	0
Santo André (loan)	2009	Série A	9	3	—		—		—		—		9	3
Ceará (loan)	2010	Série A	17	0	—		—		—		1 (Note: Appearance(s) in Copa do Nordeste)	1	18	1
América Mineiro (loan)	2011	Série A	3	0	9	2	0	0	—		—		12	2
Nanchang Hengyuan	2011	Chinese Super League	14	2	—		—		—		—		14	2
Botafogo-SP	2012	Paulista	—		17	3	—		—		—		17	3
Avaí	2012	Série B	17	0	—		0	0	—		—		17	0
Mirassol	2013	Paulista	—		18	7	—		—		—		18	7
Sport	2013	Série B	23	3	—		0	0	3 (Note: All appearance(s) in Copa Sudamericana)	0	—		26	3
Botafogo-SP	2014	Paulista	—		12	2	—		—		—		12	2
Chapecoense	2014	Série A	25	4	—		0	0	—		—		25	4
Chapecoense	2015	Série A	31	3	4	1	2	0	4	1	—		41	5
Chapecoense	Subtotal		56	7	4	1	2	0	4	1	—		66	9
Al-Shabab	2015–16	Saudi Professional League	9	0	—		1	1	—		—		10	1
Botafogo	2016	Série A	28	6	—		2	0	—		—		30	6
Botafogo	2017	Série A	7	0	8	0	3	0	9 (Note: All appearance(s) in Copa Libertadores)	1	—		27	1
Botafogo	Subtotal		35	6	8	0	5	0	9	1	—		57	7
Internacional	2017	Série B	19	0	—		—		—		1 (Note: All appearance(s) in Primeira Liga)	0	20	0
Internacional	2018	Série A	15	1	7	0	2	0	—		—		24	1
Internacional	2019	Série A	1	0	6	1	0	0	0	0	—		7	1
Internacional	Subtotal		35	1	13	1	2	0	0	0	1	0	51	2
Chapecoense	2019	Série A	0	0	—		—		—		—		0	0
Career total			238	22	89	16	10	1	16	2	2	1	362	42

=== International ===
As of 25 January 2017

Brazil
Year	Apps	Goals
2017	1	0
Total	1	0

== Honours ==
Cruzeiro

- Campeonato Mineiro: 2009

Mirassol

- Campeonato Brasileiro Série C: 2022

=== Individual ===
- Best Left Winger in Brazil: 2016
