= Evandro Guimarães =

Brazilian footballer (born 1973)

Personal information
- Full name: Evandro Braz Guimarães
- Date of birth: 30 July 1973 (age 53)
- Place of birth: Itabuna, Brazil
- Height: 1.76 m (5 ft 9 in)
- Position: Midfielder

Senior career*
Years	Team	Apps	(Gls)
2000–2001	Atlético Balboa		
2001	Maccabi Ahi Nazareth		

Managerial career
- 2010: Marília-MA U18
- 2011–2013: Grêmio Barueri (assistant)
- 2012: Grêmio Barueri (interim)
- 2014–2015: Vitória da Conquista
- 2015: Coruripe
- 2016: Vitória da Conquista
- 2016: Juazeirense
- 2016–2017: Salgueiro
- 2018: Fluminense de Feira
- 2018: Juazeirense
- 2019: Destroyers
- 2019: Brusque
- 2020: Central
- 2021: CSE
- 2021: Itabaiana
- 2022: Altos
- 2023: Afogados
- 2023: União Cacoalense
- 2023–2024: Inter de Lages
- 2024: Itabuna
- 2024: Juazeirense
- 2025: Campinense
- 2025: Metropolitano
- 2026: Atlético de Cajazeiras
- 2026: Altos
- * Club domestic league appearances and goals

Evandro Braz Guimarães (born 30 July 1973), sometimes known as just Evandro, is a Brazilian professional football coach and former player who played as a midfielder.
