= 2024 Esporte Clube Vitória season =

Vitória
2024 season
- Manager: Thiago Carpini
- Stadium: Barradão
- Série A: 11th
- Campeonato Baiano: Taça Guanabara
- Copa do Brasil: Second stage
- Average home league attendance: 22,731

The 2024 season was Vitória's 126th in existence. They played in the Série A and the Campeonato Baiano and the Copa do Brasil.

== Players ==
=== First-team squad ===
As of 20 August 2024

Note: Flags indicate national team as defined under FIFA eligibility rules; some limited exceptions apply. Players may hold more than one non-FIFA nationality.

No.	Pos.	Nation	Player
1	GK	BRA	Lucas Arcanjo
4	DF	BRA	Wagner Leonardo
5	MF	BRA	Léo Naldi
8	MF	BRA	Luan (on loan from São Paulo)
9	FW	BRA	Alerrandro (on loan from Red Bull Bragantino)
10	MF	BRA	Jean Mota
11	FW	BRA	Osvaldo
12	FW	BRA	Luiz Adriano
13	DF	BRA	Camutanga
14	DF	BRA	Patric Calmon
15	MF	BRA	Caio Vinícius
16	DF	BRA	Lucas Esteves
17	FW	BRA	Zé Hugo
19	FW	BRA	Luis Miguel
22	GK	BRA	Muriel
25	DF	BRA	Bruno Uvini
27	DF	PAR	Raúl Cáceres

No.	Pos.	Nation	Player
28	MF	BRA	Ricardo Ryller
29	MF	BRA	Willian Oliveira
30	FW	BRA	Matheuzinho
33	FW	BRA	Lawan
35	GK	BRA	Fintelman
36	MF	BRA	Filipe Machado
37	FW	BRA	Everaldo
39	FW	BRA	Janderson
43	DF	BRA	Edu
44	DF	BRA	Roque Júnior
50	MF	BRA	José Breno
62	MF	BRA	Pablo
77	DF	BRA	Neris
83	FW	BRA	Fábio Soares
96	FW	BRA	Carlos Eduardo
97	DF	BRA	Willean Lepo
—	FW	BRA	Léo Jabá (on loan from São Bernardo)

=== Youth team ===
Note: Flags indicate national team as defined under FIFA eligibility rules; some limited exceptions apply. Players may hold more than one non-FIFA nationality.

No.	Pos.	Nation	Player
—	GK	BRA	Yuri Sena

=== Out on loan ===
Note: Flags indicate national team as defined under FIFA eligibility rules; some limited exceptions apply. Players may hold more than one non-FIFA nationality.

No.	Pos.	Nation	Player
—	GK	BRA	Arthur Cordeiro (at Itabuna until 30 November 2024)
—	GK	BRA	Cabral (at Itabuna until 30 September 2024)
—	GK	BRA	Luis Eduardo (at Itabuna until 30 November 2024)
—	GK	BRA	Pedro Antônio (at Itabuna until 30 November 2024)
—	DF	BRA	Andrei (at Itabuna until 30 September 2024)
—	DF	BRA	Felipe Vieira (at Chapecoense until 30 November 2024)
—	DF	BRA	João Victor (at Mirassol until 30 November 2024)
—	DF	BRA	John Lessa (at Itabuna until 30 September 2024)
—	DF	BRA	Marco Antônio (at Náutico until 30 November 2024)
—	DF	BRA	Mateus Moraes (at Yokohama FC until 31 December 2024)
—	DF	BRA	Matheus Tocantins (at Itabuna until 30 September 2024)
—	DF	BRA	Pedro Henrique (at Itabuna until 30 September 2024)
—	DF	BRA	Renato (at Itabuna until 30 September 2024)
—	DF	BRA	Riquelme (at Itabuna until 30 September 2024)
—	MF	BRA	Alan Pedro (at FC Cascavel until 30 November 2024)
—	MF	BRA	Daniel Júnior (at América Mineiro until 30 November 2024)

No.	Pos.	Nation	Player
—	MF	BRA	Dionísio (at Brusque until 30 November 2024)
—	MF	BRA	Dudu (at Novorizontino until 30 November 2024)
—	MF	BRA	Edenilson (at Itabuna until 30 September 2024)
—	MF	BRA	Eduardo (at CSA until 30 November 2024)
—	MF	BRA	Gabriel Santiago (at ABC until 30 November 2024)
—	MF	BRA	Gerson Neto (at Itabuna until 30 September 2024)
—	MF	BRA	Hugo (at Itabuna until 30 September 2024)
—	MF	BRA	João Pedro (at CRB until 30 November 2024)
—	MF	BRA	Wanderson Papaterra (at Itabuna until 30 September 2024)
—	FW	BRA	Alisson Santos (at União de Leiria until 30 June 2025)
—	FW	BRA	Kennedy (at Itabuna until 30 September 2024)
—	FW	BRA	Manoel França (at Itabuna until 30 September 2024)
—	FW	BRA	Rodrigo Dias (at Itabuna until 30 September 2024)
—	FW	BRA	Ruan Nascimento (at Itabuna until 30 September 2024)
—	FW	BRA	Xandy (at Itabuna until 30 September 2024)

== Competitions ==
=== Overall record ===
Competition	First match	Last match	Starting round	Final position	Record							
Competition	First match	Last match	Starting round	Final position	Pld	W	D	L	GF	GA	GD	Win %
Série A	April 2024	December 2024	Matchday 1	11th	38	13	8	17	45	52	−7	34.21
Campeonato Baiano	January 2024			Winners	13	9	2	2	24	9	+15	69.23
Copa do Brasil			Third round	Third Round	2	0	1	1	2	3	−1	0.00
Copa do Nordeste	4 February 2024	27 March	Group Stage	Group Stage	8	4	2	2	12	7	+5	50.00
Total					61	26	13	22	83	71	+12	42.62

Source: [ Soccerway]

=== Série A ===
==== League table ====
Pos	Team	Pld	W	D	L	GF	GA	GD	Pts	Qualification or relegation
9	Cruzeiro	38	14	10	14	43	41	+2	52	Qualification for Copa Sudamericana group stage
10	Vasco da Gama	38	14	8	16	43	56	−13	50	Qualification for Copa Sudamericana group stage
11	Vitória	38	13	8	17	45	52	−7	47	Qualification for Copa Sudamericana group stage
12	Atlético Mineiro	38	11	14	13	47	54	−7	47	Qualification for Copa Sudamericana group stage
13	Fluminense	38	12	10	16	33	39	−6	46	Qualification for Copa Sudamericana group stage

Source: CBF
Rules for classification: 1) points; 2) wins; 3) goal difference; 4) goals scored; 5) head-to-head results (only between two teams); 6) fewest red cards; 7) fewest yellow cards; 8) drawing of lots.

==== Results summary ====
Overall								Home						Away					
Pld	W	D	L	GF	GA	GD	Pts	W	D	L	GF	GA	GD	W	D	L	GF	GA	GD
0	0	0	0	0	0	0	0	0	0	0	0	0	0	0	0	0	0	0	0

==== Results by round ====
Round	1
Ground	
Result	
Position	

A = Away; H = Home; W = Win; D = Draw; L = Loss

==== Matches ====
14 April 2024 1	Vitória	0–1	Palmeiras

21 April 2024 3	Vitória	2–2	Bahia

28 April 2024 4	Cruzeiro	3–1	Vitória

5 May 2024 5	Vitória	1–3	São Paulo

12 May 2024 6	Vasco da Gama	2–1	Vitória

1 June 2024 7	Vitória	0–2	Atlético Goianiense

5 June 2024 2	Cuiabá	0–0	Vitória

11 June 2024 8	Juventude	1–1	Vitória

16 June 2024 9	Vitória	2–1	Internacional

20 June 2024 10	Vitória	4–2	Atlético Mineiro

23 June 2024 11	Red Bull Bragantino	2–1	Vitória

27 June 2024 12	Fluminense	0–1	Vitória

30 June 2024 13	Vitória	0–1	Athletico Paranaense

4 July 2024 14	Corinthians	3–2	Vitória

7 July 2024 15	Vitória	2–1	Criciúma

11 July 2024 16	Vitória	0–1	Botafogo

17 July 2024 17	Fortaleza	3–1	Vitória

21 July 2024 18	Grêmio	2–0	Vitória

24 July 2024 19	Vitória	1–2	Flamengo

27 July 2024 20	Palmeiras	0–2	Vitória

3 August 2024 21	Vitória	1–0	Cuiabá

11 August 2024 22	Bahia	2–0	Vitória

19 August 2024 23	Vitória	2–2	Cruzeiro

25 August 2024 24	São Paulo	2–1	Vitória

1 September 2024 25	Vitória	0–1	Vasco da Gama

14 September 2024 26	Atlético Goianiense	0–2	Vitória

21 September 2024 27	Vitória	1–0	Juventude

29 September 2024 28	Internacional	3–1	Vitória

5 October 2024 29	Atlético Mineiro	2–2	Vitória

19 October 2024 30	Vitória	1–0	Red Bull Bragantino

26 October 2024 31	Vitória	2–1	Fluminense

2 November 2024 32	Athletico Paranaense	1–2	Vitória

9 November 2024 33	Vitória	1–2	Corinthians

20 November 2024 34	Criciúma	0–1	Vitória

23 November 2024 35	Botafogo	1–1	Vitória

1 December 2024 36	Vitória	2–0	Fortaleza

4 December 2024 37	Vitória	1–1	Grêmio

8 December 2024 38	Flamengo	2–2	Vitória

=== Copa do Brasil ===
==== Third round ====
2 May 2024 First leg	Botafogo	1–0	Vitória
19:00 UTC−3

22 May 2024 Second leg	Vitória	1–2 (1–3 agg.)	Botafogo
19:00 UTC−3
