= 2026 Esporte Clube Vitória season =

Vitória
2026 season
- Chairman: Fábio Rios Mota
- Manager: Jair Ventura (until 2 November); Rafael Lacerda (from 10 November)
- Stadium: Barradão
- Série A: 14th
- Baiano: Runners-up
- Copa do Brasil: Quarter-finals
- Copa do Nordeste: Champions (5th title)
Home colours	Away colours

The 2026 season will be Esporte Clube Vitória's 127th season in club's history. The club will compete in the Campeonato Baiano, Copa do Brasil, Copa do Nordeste and Série A.

== Squad ==
As of 22 September 2026

Note: Flags indicate national team as defined under FIFA eligibility rules; some limited exceptions apply. Players may hold more than one non-FIFA nationality.

No.	Pos.	Nation	Player
1	GK	BRA	Lucas Arcanjo (vice-captain)
2	DF	ARG	Emanuel Brítez
3	DF	BRA	Darlan (on loan from Grêmio Anápolis)
4	DF	BRA	Camutanga
6	MF	ARG	Emmanuel Martínez
7	FW	BRA	Marinho
8	MF	ARG	Tomás Pochettino (on loan from Fortaleza)
9	FW	BRA	Alex Bruno (on loan from ASA)
10	MF	BRA	Matheuzinho
11	FW	BRA	Osvaldo
12	FW	ARG	Diego Tarzia
13	DF	BRA	Ramon (on loan from Internacional)
15	MF	BRA	Walace (on loan from Cruzeiro)
16	MF	POR	Rúben Ismael
18	DF	BRA	Kauan Coutinho
20	FW	BRA	Lucas Silva (on loan from Seoul)
21	MF	BRA	Dudu
23	FW	BRA	Fabrí
25	DF	BRA	Cacá (on loan from Corinthians)

No.	Pos.	Nation	Player
26	DF	BRA	Edenilson
28	FW	BRA	Anderson Pato
33	FW	BRA	Erick
35	GK	BRA	Fintelman
36	DF	BRA	Luan Cândido (on loan from Red Bull Bragantino)
41	MF	BRA	Wendell Santos
43	DF	BRA	Edu Ribeiro
44	MF	BRA	Gabriel Baralhas (captain)
45	DF	BRA	Nathan Mendes (on loan from Red Bull Bragantino)
70	DF	BRA	Fabiano (on loan from Moreirense)
71	GK	BRA	Yuri Sena
79	FW	BRA	Renato Kayzer
83	DF	BRA	Jamerson (on loan from Coritiba)
88	MF	BRA	Zé Vitor (on loan from Maringá)
91	FW	BRA	Renê
95	MF	BRA	Caíque Gonçalves
98	DF	BRA	Mateus Silva
—	FW	URU	Ignacio Laquintana (on loan from Red Bull Bragantino)

== Competitions ==
=== Overall record ===
Competition	First match	Last match	Starting round	Final position	Record							
Competition	First match	Last match	Starting round	Final position	Pld	W	D	L	GF	GA	GD	Win %
Baiano	10 January	7 March	First stage	Runners-up	11	4	5	2	15	7	+8	36.36
Série A	28 January	2 December	Matchday 1		35	11	8	16	37	52	−15	31.43
Copa do Nordeste	25 March	6 June	Group stage	Winners	10	8	1	1	29	15	+14	80.00
Copa do Brasil	22 April	14 May	Fifth round	Quarter-finals	6	2	0	4	7	7	+0	33.33
Total					62	25	14	23	88	81	+7	40.32

Last updated: 21 November 2026
Source: Competitions

=== Campeonato Baiano ===
==== First stage ====
10 January 2026 1	Vitória	0–0	Atlético de Alagoinhas	Salvador
16:00 (UTC-3)		Report		Stadium: Estádio Manoel Barradas (Barradão); Attendance: 8,360; Referee: Josué Reis de Jesus Júnior

13 January 2026 2	Jacuipense	0–0	Vitória	Salvador
19:15 (UTC-3)		Report		Stadium: Estádio Governador Roberto Santos (Pituaçu); Attendance: 1,290; Referee: Emerson Souza Silva

18 January 2026 3	Porto	1–1	Vitória	Porto Seguro
16:00 (UTC-3)	Ítalo 59'	Report	Pablo 37'	Stadium: Estádio Municipal Agnaldo Bento dos Santos; Attendance: 982; Referee: Bruno Pereira Vasconcelos

21 January 2026 4	Vitória	4–0	Juazeirense	Salvador
19:15 (UTC-3)	Mateusinho 10'; Renato Kayzer 42', 61'; Elivelton 57'	Report		Stadium: Estádio Manoel Barradas (Barradão); Attendance: 7,929; Referee: Marielson Alves Silva

25 January 2026 5	Vitória	0–1	Bahia	Salvador
16:00 (UTC-3)		Report	Dell 60'	Stadium: Estádio Manoel Barradas (Barradão); Attendance: 29,843; Referee: Wagner Francisco Silva Souza

1 February 2026 6	Barcelona de Ilhéus	0–2	Vitória	Feira de Santana
16:00 (UTC-3)		Report	Lawan 65'; Luis Miguel 70'	Stadium: Estádio Professor Jodilton Souza (Arena Cajueiro); Attendance: 1,647; Referee: Bruno Nogueira Prado

7 February 2026 7	Jequié	2–2	Vitória	Jequié
16:00 (UTC-3)	Nael 27'; Tiago Recife 46'	Report	Kike Saverio 10'; Pablo 69'	Stadium: Estádio Waldomiro Borges; Attendance: 1,885; Referee: Bruno Pereira Vasconcelos

18 February 2026 8	Vitória	1–0	Bahia de Feira	Salvador
19:15 (UTC-3)	Martínez 74'	Report		Stadium: Estádio Manoel Barradas (Barradão); Attendance: 6,053; Referee: Ricardo de Almeida Andrade

22 February 2026 9	Vitória	3–0	Galícia	Salvador
16:00 (UTC-3)	Erick 38'; Cantalapiedra 49'; Matheuzinho 50'	Report		Stadium: Estádio Manoel Barradas (Barradão); Attendance: 6,267; Referee: Josué Reis de Jesus Júnior

==== Semi-final ====
1 March 2026	Vitória	1–1 (4–2 p)	Jacuipense	Salvador
17:00 (UTC-3)	Renato Kayzer 2'	Report	Pedro Henrique 65'	Stadium: Estádio Manoel Barradas (Barradão); Attendance: 14,164; Referee: Wagner Francisco Silva Souza
	Penalties
	Renato Kayzer (penalty scored); Osvaldo (penalty scored); Aitor Cantalapiedra (penalty scored); Marinho (penalty scored)		(penalty scored) Thiaguinho; (penalty missed) Alison; (penalty scored) Vicente; (penalty missed) Flavinho

==== Final ====
7 March 2026	Bahia	2–1	Vitória	Salvador
17:00 (UTC-3)	Jean Lucas 53', 65'	Report	Gabriel Baralhas 19'	Stadium: Estádio Manoel Barradas (Barradão); Attendance: 48,261; Referee: Wilton Pereira Sampaio

=== Copa do Nordeste ===
==== Group stage ====
25 March 2026 1	Vitória	1–2	Botafogo–PB	Salvador
19:30 (UTC-3)	Osvaldo 5'	Report	Rodolfo 33'; Dudu Hatamoto 35'	Stadium: Estádio Manoel Barradas (Barradão); Attendance: 8,462; Referee: Raimundo Rodrigues de Oliveira Júnior

28 March 2026 2	CRB	2–4	Vitória	Maceió
17:00 (UTC-3)	Crystopher 11'; Douglas Baggio 47'	Report	Gabriel Baralhas 6'; Erick 9'; Renato Kayzer 43'; Tarzia 73'	Stadium: Estádio Rei Pelé; Attendance: 6,538; Referee: Paulo José Souza Mourão

8 April 2026 3	Vitória	4–1	Juazeirense	Salvador
19:00 (UTC-3)	Renê 4'; Matheuzinho 14'; Lucas Rodrigues 83'; Erick 90+'	Report	Marlon 88'	Stadium: Estádio Manoel Barradas (Barradão); Attendance: 5,658; Referee: Diego Fernando Silva de Lima

15 April 2026 4	Vitória	3–1	Piauí	Salvador
21:30 (UTC-3)	Renê 26', 84'; Erick 69'	Report	Kauan Maranhão 47'	Stadium: Estádio Manoel Barradas (Barradão); Attendance: 3,154; Referee: Tarcisio Flores da Silva

29 April 2026 5	Confiança	2–2	Vitória	Aracaju
21:30 (UTC-3)	Gabriel Zeca 15'; Iago 51'	Report	López 7'; Rafael Pascoal 39' (o.g.)	Stadium: Estádio Lourival Baptista (Batistão); Referee: Luciano da Silva Miranda Filho

==== Quarter-final ====
6 May 2026	Vitória	1–0	Ceará	Salvador
21:30 (UTC-3)	Renato Kayzer 18'	Report		Stadium: Estádio Manoel Barradas (Barradão); Attendance: 9,893; Referee: Dênis da Silva Ribeiro Serafim

==== Semi-final ====
20 May 2026	Vitória	6–2	ABC	Salvador
21:00 (UTC-3)	Renato Kayzer 24', 45+11' (pen.); Renê 46', 58'; Osvaldo 82', 90+2' (pen.)	Report	Igor Bahia 6'; Wallyson 42'	Stadium: Estádio Manoel Barradas (Barradão); Attendance: 15,867; Referee: Léo Simão Holanda

27 May 2026	ABC	3–4	Vitória	Natal
21:30 (UTC-3)	Luiz Fernando 15', 31'; Igor Bahia 87'	Report	Nathan Mendes 21'; Gabriel Baralhas 73'; Fabri 88'; Erick 90' (pen.)	Stadium: Arena das Dunas; Referee: Márcio Iglesias Araújo Silva

==== Finals ====
2 June 2026	Fortaleza	1–2	Vitória	Fortaleza
21:00 (UTC-3)	Vitinho 54'	Report	Renato Kayzer 83' (pen.); Tarzia 90+2'	Stadium: Estádio Governador Plácido Castelo (Castelão); Attendance: 30,042; Referee: Afro Rocha de Carvalho Filho

6 June 2026	Vitória	2–1	Fortaleza	Salvador
16:00 (UTC-3)	Martínez 71'; Renato Kayzer 90'	Report	Luiz Fernando 27'	Stadium: Estádio Manoel Barradas (Barradão); Attendance: 28,989; Referee: Rodrigo José Pereira de Lima

=== Copa do Brasil ===
==== Fifth round ====
22 April 2026	Flamengo	2–1	Vitória	Rio de Janeiro
21:30 (UTC-3)	Evertton Araújo 10'; Pedro 52'	Report	Erick 11'	Stadium: Estádio Jornalista Mário Filho (Maracanã); Attendance: 44,292; Referee: Anderson Daronco

14 May 2026	Vitória	2–0	Flamengo	Salvador
21:30 (UTC-3)	Erick 6'; Luan Cândido 61'	Report		Stadium: Estádio Manoel Barradas (Barradão); Attendance: 30,793; Referee: Raphael Claus

==== Round of 16 ====
3 August 2026	Athletico Paranaense	2–0	Vitória	Curitiba
21:00 (UTC-3)	João Cruz 8'; Dudu 77'	Report		Stadium: Estádio Mario Celso Petraglia (Arena da Baixada); Attendance: 23,824; Referee: Edina Alves Batista

6 August 2026	Vitória	4–0	Athletico Paranaense	Salvador
20:00 (UTC-3)	Renê 10', 58'; Erick 45+4'; Marinho 90+2'	Report		Stadium: Estádio Manoel Barradas (Barradão); Attendance: 20,638; Referee: Braulio da Silva Machado

==== Quarter-finals ====
26 August 2026	Vasco da Gama	1–0	Vitória	Rio de Janeiro
21:30 (UTC-3)	Gómez 58'	Report		Stadium: Estádio Vasco da Gama (São Januário); Attendance: 19,194; Referee: Matheus Delgado Candançan

2 September 2026	Vitória	0–2	Vasco da Gama	Salvador
21:30 (UTC-3)		Report	Gómez 80'; Puma Rodríguez 90+6'	Stadium: Estádio Manoel Barradas (Barradão); Attendance: 28,499; Referee: Rafael Rodrigo Klein

=== Série A ===
==== League table ====
Pos	Team	Pld	W	D	L	GF	GA	GD	Pts	Qualification or relegation
12	Botafogo	35	11	9	15	46	57	−11	42	Qualification for Copa Sudamericana group stage
13	Coritiba	35	11	9	15	40	52	−12	42	
14	Vitória	35	11	8	16	37	52	−15	41	
15	Mirassol	35	10	11	14	39	48	−9	41	
16	Corinthians	35	10	10	15	40	42	−2	40	

Updated to match(es) played on 19 November 2026. Source: CBF
Rules for classification: 1) points; 2) wins; 3) goal difference; 4) goals scored; 5) head-to-head results (only between two teams); 6) fewest red cards; 7) fewest yellow cards; 8) drawing of lots.

==== Results by round ====
Round	1	2	3	4	5	6	7	8	9	10	11	12	13	14	15	16	17	18	19	20	21	22	23	24	25	26	27	28	29	30	31	32	33	34	35
Ground	H	A	H	A	A	H	A	H	A	A	H	H	A	H	A	A	H	A	H	A	H	A	H	H	A	H	A	H	H	A	A	H	A	H	H
Result	W	L	L	D	D	W	L	W	L	D	W	D	L	W	D	L	W	L	W	L	L	L	W	L	L	W	D	L	W	L	D	D	L	L	W
Position	3	13	14	15	15	10	12	10	12	14	8	11	13	9	10	13	10	13	11	13	13	13	12	12	14	13	13	14	13	13	14	14	14	15	14
Points	3	3	3	4	5	8	8	11	11	12	15	16	16	19	20	20	23	23	26	26	26	26	29	29	29	32	33	33	36	36	37	38	38	38	41

Updated to match(es) played on 6 November 2026. Source:
A = Away; H = Home; W = Win; D = Draw; L = Loss

==== Matches ====
28 January 2026 1	Vitória	2–0	Remo	Salvador
19:00 (UTC-3)	Renato Kayzer 59'; Gabriel Baralhas 78'	Report		Stadium: Estádio Manoel Barradas (Barradão); Attendance: 16,603; Referee: Ramon Abatti Abel

4 February 2026 2	Palmeiras	5–1	Vitória	Barueri
21:30 (UTC-3)	Murilo 24'; Gómez 28'; Allan 63'; Maurício 45+5'; Sosa 80'	Report	Dudu 56'	Stadium: Arena Barueri; Attendance: 8,953; Referee: Sávio Pereira Sampaio

10 February 2026 3	Vitória	1–2	Flamengo	Salvador
21:30 (UTC-3)	Matheuzinho 6'	Report	Pulgar 14'; Everton 45+3'	Stadium: Estádio Manoel Barradas (Barradão); Attendance: 27,080; Referee: Raphael Claus

11 March 2026 5	Bahia	1–1	Vitória	Salvador
20:00 (UTC-3)	Jean Lucas 45+5'	Report	Ramon 45+1'	Stadium: Casa de Apostas (Arena Fonte Nova); Attendance: 46,632; Referee: Rafael Rodrigo Klein

14 March 2026 6	Vitória	2–0	Atlético Mineiro	Salvador
18:30 (UTC-3)	Renato Kayzer 19'; Erick 67'	Report		Stadium: Estádio Manoel Barradas (Barradão); Attendance: 16,533; Referee: João Vitor Gobi

19 March 2026 7	Grêmio	2–0	Vitória	Porto Alegre
19:00 (UTC-3)	Camutanga 26' (o.g.); Amuzu 53'	Report		Stadium: Arena do Grêmio; Attendance: 20,206; Referee: Alex Gomes Stefano

22 March 2026 8	Vitória	1–0	Mirassol	Salvador
18:30 (UTC-3)	Gabriel Baralhas 27'	Report		Stadium: Estádio Manoel Barradas (Barradão); Attendance: 17,995; Referee: Wagner do Nascimento Magalhães

1 April 2026 9	Cruzeiro	3–0	Vitória	Belo Horizonte
20:00 (UTC-3)	Christian 32'; Kauã Moraes 35'; Kaio Jorge 38'	Report		Stadium: Estádio Governador Magalhães Pinto (Mineirão); Attendance: 23,907; Referee: Yuri Elino Ferreira da Cruz

5 April 2026 10	Chapecoense	1–1	Vitória	Chapecó
16:00 (UTC-3)	Neto Pessoa 86'	Report	Matheuzinho 90+2' (pen.)	Stadium: Arena Condá; Attendance: 9,484; Referee: Jonathan Benkenstein Pinheiro

11 April 2026 11	Vitória	2–0	São Paulo	Salvador
16:30 (UTC-3)	Cacá 35'; Ramon 82'	Report		Stadium: Estádio Manoel Barradas (Barradão); Attendance: 18,102; Referee: Anderson Daronco

18 April 2026 12	Vitória	0–0	Corinthians	Salvador
20:00 (UTC-3)		Report		Stadium: Estádio Manoel Barradas (Barradão); Attendance: 21,991; Referee: Alex Gomes Stefano

26 April 2026 13	Athletico Paranaense	3–1	Vitória	Curitiba
18:30 (UTC-3)	Viveros 33' (pen.), 90+1'; Luiz Gustavo 90+7'	Report	Renê 21'	Stadium: Estádio Mario Celso Petraglia (Arena da Baixada); Attendance: 18,021; Referee: Bruno Arleu de Araújo

2 May 2026 14	Vitória	4–1	Coritiba	Salvador
18:30 (UTC-3)	Renê 14'; Zé Vitor 27'; Tarzia 54'; Erick 60' (pen.)	Report	Pedro Rocha 45+2'	Stadium: Estádio Manoel Barradas (Barradão); Attendance: 18,012; Referee: Rafael Rodrigo Klein

9 May 2026 15	Fluminense	2–2	Vitória	Rio de Janeiro
18:00 (UTC-3)	John Kennedy 36'; Riquelme Felipe 90'	Report	Ramon 57'; Renato Kayzer 66'	Stadium: Estádio Jornalista Mário Filho (Maracanã); Attendance: 17,670; Referee: Bráulio da Silva Machado

17 May 2026 16	Red Bull Bragantino	2–0	Vitória	Bragança Paulista
18:30 (UTC-3)	Tiago Volpi 40' (pen.); Lucas Barbosa 90+9'	Report		Stadium: Estádio Cícero de Souza Marques; Attendance: 1,793; Referee: Wagner do Nascimento Magalhães

23 May 2026 17	Vitória	2–0	Internacional	Salvador
17:00 (UTC-3)	Renê 29'; Tarzia 90+7'	Report		Stadium: Estádio Manoel Barradas (Barradão); Attendance: 25,114; Referee: Felipe Fernandes de Lima

30 May 2026 18	Santos	3–1	Vitória	Santos
20:00 (UTC-3)	Miguelito 18'; Barreal 53'; Gabriel Barbosa 55'	Report	Renê 73'	Stadium: Estádio Urbano Caldeira (Vila Belmiro); Attendance: 11,172; Referee: Rafael Rodrigo Klein

16 July 2026 19	Vitória	1–0	Vasco da Gama	Salvador
19:30 (UTC-3)	Renato Kayzer 68'	Report		Stadium: Estádio Manoel Barradas (Barradão); Attendance: 20,112; Referee: Matheus Delgado Candançan

23 July 2026 4*	Botafogo	0–0	Vitória	Rio de Janeiro
19:30 (UTC-3)		Report		Stadium: Estádio Olímpico Nilton Santos (Engenhão); Attendance: 16,772; Referee: Jonathan Benkenstein Pinheiro

26 July 2026 20	Remo	2–0	Vitória	Belém
19:30 (UTC-3)	Jajá 38'; Alef Manga 54'	Report		Stadium: Estádio Olímpico do Pará (Mangueirão); Referee: Flavio Rodrigues de Souza

29 July 2026 21	Vitória	0–4	Palmeiras	Salvador
21:30 (UTC-3)		Report	Maurício 45+1'; Fabiano 45+6' (o.g.); Arias 70'; Sosa 84'	Stadium: Estádio Manoel Barradas (Barradão); Attendance: 14,818; Referee: Alex Gomes Stefano

9 August 2026 22	Flamengo	2–0	Vitória	Rio de Janeiro
19:30 (UTC-3)	Pulgar 13'; Bruno Henrique 79'	Report		Stadium: Estádio Jornalista Mário Filho (Maracanã); Attendance: 58,336; Referee: Wilton Pereira Sampaio

16 August 2026 23	Vitória	1–0	Botafogo	Salvador
18:30 (UTC-3)	Matheuzinho 26' (pen.)	Report		Stadium: Estádio Manoel Barradas (Barradão); Attendance: 20,025; Referee: Paulo Cesar Zanovelli da Silva

23 August 2026 24	Vitória	0–2	Bahia	Salvador
16:00 (UTC-3)		Report	Véliz 66'; Jean Lucas 90+6'	Stadium: Estádio Manoel Barradas (Barradão); Attendance: 30,553; Referee: Raphael Claus

29 August 2026 25	Atlético Mineiro	2–1	Vitória	Belo Horizonte
18:30 (UTC-3)	Borbas 24'; Reinier 62'	Report	Erick 86'	Stadium: Arena MRV; Attendance: 23,370; Referee: Edina Alves Batista

7 September 2026 26	Vitória	1–0	Grêmio	Salvador
20:00 (UTC-3)	Renê 63'	Report		Stadium: Estádio Manoel Barradas (Barradão); Attendance: 8,934; Referee: Sávio Pereira Sampaio

13 September 2026 27	Mirassol	2–2	Vitória	Mirassol
16:00 (UTC-3)	Bruno Santos 67'; Edson Carioca 90'	Report	Renê 2', 12'	Stadium: Estádio José Maria de Campos Maia; Attendance: 4,393; Referee: Ramon Abatti Abel

20 September 2026 28	Vitória	1–3	Cruzeiro	Salvador
16:00 (UTC-3)	Renê 38'	Report	Arroyo 46'; Villalba 65'; Matheus Pereira 90+6'	Stadium: Estádio Manoel Barradas (Barradão); Attendance: 12,952; Referee: Matheus Delgado Candançan

7 October 2026 29	Vitória	4–0	Chapecoense	Salvador
20:00 (UTC-3)	Erick 17', 59'; Matheuzinho 52', 73'	Report		Stadium: Estádio Manoel Barradas (Barradão); Attendance: 13,934; Referee: Edina Alves Batista

10 October 2026 30	São Paulo	2–1	Vitória	São Paulo
21:00 (UTC-3)	Calleri 19', 69'	Report	Martínez 38'	Stadium: Estádio Cícero Pompeu de Toledo (Morumbi); Attendance: 22,618; Referee: Bráulio da Silva Machado

19 October 2026 31	Corinthians	1–1	Vitória	São Paulo
20:00 (UTC-3)	Yuri Alberto 65' (pen.)	Report	Renê 45'	Stadium: Neo Química Arena (Arena Corinthians); Attendance: 41,137; Referee: Sávio Pereira Sampaio

24 October 2026 32	Vitória	1–1	Athletico Paranaense	Salvador
16:30 (UTC-3)	Renato Kayzer 28'	Report	Jamerson Bahia 24' (o.g.)	Stadium: Estádio Manoel Barradas (Barradão); Attendance: 16,674; Referee: André Luiz Skettino Policarpo Bento

31 October 2026 33	Coritiba	2–0	Vitória	Curitiba
16:00 (UTC-3)	Pedro Rocha 57'; Tinga 68'	Report		Stadium: Estádio Major Antônio (Couto Pereira); Attendance: 23,570; Referee: Jonathan Benkenstein Pinheiro

6 November 2026 34	Vitória	0–3	Fluminense	Salvador
20:00 (UTC-3)		Report	Savarino 14'; Canobbio 41'; Castillo 89'	Stadium: Estádio Manoel Barradas (Barradão); Attendance: 20,142; Referee: Rodrigo José Pereira de Lima

19 November 2026 35	Vitória	2–1	Red Bull Bragantino	Salvador
19:30 (UTC-3)	Brítez 4'; Renê 24'	Report	Mosquera 73'	Stadium: Estádio Manoel Barradas (Barradão); Attendance: 14,419; Referee: Ramon Abatti Abel

22 November 2026 36	Internacional	–	Vitória	Porto Alegre
(UTC-3)				Stadium: Estádio José Pinheiro Borda (Beira-Rio)

29 November 2026 37	Vitória	–	Santos	Salvador
(UTC-3)				Stadium: Estádio Manoel Barradas (Barradão)

2 December 2026 38	Vasco da Gama	–	Vitória	Rio de Janeiro
(UTC-3)				Stadium: Estádio Vasco da Gama (São Januário)

(*) Postponed matches due to changes in competition schedules
