= 2025 Esporte Clube Vitória season =

Esporte Clube Vitória
2025 season
- President: Fábio Rios Mota
- Manager: Thiago Carpini (until 9 July); Fábio Carille (9 July–26 August); Jair Ventura (from 24 September)
- Stadium: Barradão
- Série A: 15th
- Campeonato Baiano: Runners-up
- Copa do Brasil: Second Round
- Copa Sudamericana: Group stage
- Copa do Nordeste: Quarter-finals
- Average home league attendance: 22,167
Home colours	Away colours	Third colours

The 2025 season was Esporte Clube Vitória's 126th overall and 1st consecutive in Brazil's top division. The club also competed in the Campeonato Baiano, Copa do Brasil, Copa Sudamericana and Copa do Nordeste.

== Squad ==
=== Current Squad ===
As of 21 July 2025

Note: Flags indicate national team as defined under FIFA eligibility rules; some limited exceptions apply. Players may hold more than one non-FIFA nationality.

No.	Pos.	Nation	Player
1	GK	BRA	Lucas Arcanjo
2	DF	BRA	Claudinho
3	DF	BRA	Zé Marcos
5	DF	BRA	Lucas Halter (on loan from Botafogo)
6	MF	BRA	Pepê
8	MF	BRA	Ronald
11	FW	BRA	Osvaldo
12	GK	BRA	Thiago Couto (on loan from Sport Recife)
16	DF	BRA	Hugo (on loan from Botafogo)
17	MF	BRA	Thiaguinho
20	MF	POR	Rúben Rodrigues
22	FW	BRA	Lucas Braga
23	FW	BRA	Fabrício
27	DF	PAR	Raúl Cáceres
28	MF	BRA	Ricardo Ryller
29	MF	BRA	Willian Oliveira

No.	Pos.	Nation	Player
30	FW	BRA	Matheuzinho
31	FW	URU	Renzo López
33	FW	BRA	Erick (on loan from São Paulo)
35	GK	BRA	Fintelman
37	MF	BRA	Bruno Xavier
38	FW	BRA	Léo Pereira (on loan from CRB)
43	DF	BRA	Edu
44	MF	BRA	Gabriel Baralhas (on loan from Internacional)
66	DF	BRA	Maykon Jesus (on loan from Atlético Mineiro)
76	MF	BRA	Felipe Cardoso (on loan from Atlético Alagoinhas)
77	DF	BRA	Neris
79	FW	BRA	Renato Kayzer
83	DF	BRA	Jamerson (on loan from Coritiba)
85	FW	BRA	Fábio Soares
97	MF	BRA	Val Soares
99	FW	BRA	Carlinhos (on loan from Flamengo)

=== Transfers In ===
Pos.	Player	Transferred from	Fee	Date	Source
MF	(Brazil) Wellington Rato	(Brazil) São Paulo	€785,000	3 January 2025	
MF	(Brazil) Ronald	(Brazil) Fortaleza	Free	5 January 2025	
DF	(Brazil) Hugo	(Brazil) Botafogo	Loan	7 January 2025	
FW	(Brazil) Fabrício	(Spain) Levante	€500,000	11 January 2025	
GK	(Brazil) Gabriel Vasconcelos	(Brazil) Coritiba	Undisclosed	13 January 2025	
FW	(Brazil) Erick	(Brazil) São Paulo	Loan	25 March 2025	
FW	(Brazil) Renato Kayzer	(Brazil) Fortaleza	R$ 5,000,000	2 April 2025	
MF	(Portugal) Rúben Rodrigues	(England) Oxford United	Undisclosed	25 June 2025	
FW	(Uruguay) Renzo López	(Saudi Arabia) Al-Fayha	Undisclosed	3 July 2025	
MF	(Spain) Aitor Cantalapiedra	(Cyprus) AEK Larnaca	Free	17 July 2025	
MF	(Portugal) Rúben Ismael	(Portugal) Moreirense	Free	17 July 2025	
DF	(Brazil) Ramon	(Brazil) Internacional	Loan	8 August 2025	

=== Transfers Out ===
Pos.	Player	Transferred to	Fee	Date	Source
MF	(Brazil) Daniel Júnior	(Brazil) América Mineiro	Loan return	31 December 2024	
GK	(Brazil) Maycon Cleiton	(Brazil) Red Bull Bragantino	Loan return	31 December 2024	
DF	(Brazil) Reynaldo	(Brazil) Coritiba	Loan return	31 December 2024	
MF	(Brazil) Luan	(Brazil) São Paulo	Loan return	31 December 2024	
FW	(Brazil) Zé Hugo	(Brazil) Azuriz	Loan return	31 December 2024	
MF	(Brazil) Dudu Miraíma	(Brazil) Noroeste	Loan	1 January 2025	
GK	(Brazil) Yuri Sena	(Brazil) Azuriz	Loan	7 January 2025	
FW	(Ecuador) Erick Castillo	(Peru) Alianza Lima	Free	7 January 2025	
FW	(Brazil) Dudu	(Brazil) Ponte Preta	Loan	8 January 2025	
MF	(Brazil) Everaldo	(Brazil) Coritiba	Undisclosed	14 January 2025	
GK	(Brazil) Maycon Cleiton	(Portugal) Portimonense	Contract terminated	16 January 2025	
MF	(Brazil) João Pedro	(Japan) Kyoto Sanga	Loan	20 January 2025	
MF	(Brazil) Dudu Miraíma	(Brazil) São Bernardo	Loan	11 April 2025	
FW	(Brazil) Carlos Eduardo	(Brazil) Mirassol	Free	17 June 2025	
FW	(Brazil) Janderson	(Turkey) Göztepe	Undisclosed	30 June 2025	
MF	(Brazil) Wellington Rato	(Brazil) Goiás	Loan	9 July 2025	
DF	(Brazil) João Victor	(Brazil) Mirassol	US$500,000	23 July 2025	

== Competitions ==
=== Overall record ===
Competition	First match	Last match	Starting round	Final position	Record							
Competition	First match	Last match	Starting round	Final position	Pld	W	D	L	GF	GA	GD	Win %
Série A	29 March 2025	21 December 2025	Matchday 1		27	5	10	12	24	42	−18	18.52
Campeonato Baiano	11 January 2025	23 March 2025	First Stage	Runners-up	13	8	4	1	26	7	+19	61.54
Copa do Brasil	25 February 2025	12 March 2025	First Round	Second Round	2	1	0	1	1	2	−1	50.00
Copa do Nordeste	22 January 2025	8 July 2025	Group stage	Quarter-finals	8	4	3	1	10	7	+3	50.00
Copa Sudamericana	2 April 2025	28 May 2025	Group stage	Group stage	6	1	3	2	3	4	−1	16.67
Total					56	19	20	17	64	62	+2	33.93

Last updated: 8 July 2025
Source: Competitions

=== Série A ===
==== League table ====
Pos	Team	Pld	W	D	L	GF	GA	GD	Pts	Qualification or relegation
13	Corinthians	38	12	11	15	42	47	−5	47	Qualification for Copa Libertadores group stage (Note: Corinthians qualified for the Copa Libertadores group stage by winning the 2025 Copa do Brasil.)
14	Vasco da Gama	38	13	6	19	55	60	−5	45	Qualification for Copa Sudamericana group stage
15	Vitória	38	11	12	15	35	52	−17	45	
16	Internacional	38	11	11	16	44	57	−13	44	
17	Ceará (R)	38	11	10	17	34	40	−6	43	Relegation to Campeonato Brasileiro Série B

Source: CBF
Rules for classification: 1) points; 2) wins; 3) goal difference; 4) goals scored; 5) head-to-head results (only between two teams); 6) fewest red cards; 7) fewest yellow cards; 8) drawing of lots.
(R) Relegated

==== Results summary ====
Overall								Home						Away					
Pld	W	D	L	GF	GA	GD	Pts	W	D	L	GF	GA	GD	W	D	L	GF	GA	GD
1	0	0	1	0	2	−2	0	0	0	0	0	0	0	0	0	1	0	2	−2

Last updated: 30 March 2025.

==== Matches ====
29 March 2025 1	Juventude	2–0	Vitória	Caxias do Sul
18:30 (UTC-3)	Taliari 8', 52'	Report		Stadium: Estádio Alfredo Jaconi; Attendance: 6,547; Referee: Paulo Cesar Zanovelli

6 April 2025 2	Vitória	1–2	Flamengo	Salvador
18:30 UTC−3	Rato 77'	Report	de Arrascaeta 62'; Bruno Henrique 87'	Stadium: Barradão; Attendance: 29,493; Referee: Rafael Rodrigo Klein

13 April 2025 3	Atlético Mineiro	2–2	Vitória	Belo Horizonte
20:30 UTC−3	Fausto Vera 57'; João Marcelo 87'	Report	Lucas Halter 47'; Matheuzinho 65'	Stadium: Mineirão; Attendance: 23,234; Referee: Davi de Oliveira Lacerda

16 April 2025 4	Vitória	2–1	Fortaleza	Salvador
21:30 (UTC-3)	Janderson 37'; Matheuzinho 74'	Report	Diogo Barbosa 48'	Stadium: Estádio Manoel Barradas (Barradão)

20 April 2025 5	Fluminense	1–1	Vitória	Rio de Janeiro
18:30 UTC-03:00	Cano 39'	Report	Lucas Braga 90'	Stadium: Maracanã

27 April 2025 6	Vitória	1–1	Grêmio	Salvador
18:30 UTC−3	Carlinhos 66'	Report	Jemerson 20'	Stadium: Barradão; Attendance: 18,688; Referee: Felipe Fernandes de Lima

3 May 2025 7	Ceará	1–0	Vitória	Fortaleza
18:30 UTC−3	Marllon 56'	Report		Stadium: Castelão

10 May 2025 8	Vitória	2–1	Vasco da Gama	Salvador
18:30 UTC−3	Renato Kayzer 60', 90'	Report	Vegetti 42'	Stadium: Barradão

18 May 2025 9	Bahia	2–1	Vitória	Salvador
16:00 (UTC-3)	Erick Pulga 23'; Michel Araújo 68'	Report	Renato Kayzer 54'	Stadium: Arena Fonte Nova

25 May 2025 10	Vitória	0–1	Santos	Salvador
18:30 (UTC-03:00)		Report	Guilherme 18'	Stadium: Barradão; Attendance: 27,515; Referee: Anderson Daronco

1 June 2025 11	Corinthians	0–0	Vitória	São Paulo
18:30 UTC−3		Report		Stadium: Neo Química Arena; Attendance: 44,943; Referee: Felipe Fernandes de Lima

12 June 2025 12	Vitória	0–0	Cruzeiro	Salvador
19:00 UTC−3		Report		Stadium: Barradão; Attendance: 6,264; Referee: Alex Gomes Stefano

12 July 2025 13	Internacional	1–0	Vitória	Porto Alegre
16:30	Bruno Tabata 90+2'	Report		Stadium: Beira-Rio; Referee: Rodrigo José Pereira de Lima

16 July 2025 14	Botafogo	0–0	Vitória	Rio de Janeiro
21:30 UTC-03:00		Report		Stadium: Nilton Santos; Referee: Lucas Casagrande

20 July 2025 15	Vitória	1–0	Red Bull Bragantino	Salvador
16:00 UTC−3	Renato Kayzer 9'	Report		Stadium: Barradão; Attendance: 16,187; Referee: Rodrigo José Pereira de Lima

23 July 2025 16	Vitória	2–2	Sport	Salvador
21:30 (UTC-3)	Erick 54'; Renzo López 90+4'	Report	Romarinho 89', 90+9'	Stadium: Estádio Manoel Barradas (Barradão)

26 July 2025 17	Mirassol	1–1	Vitória	Mirassol
18:30 UTC−3	Edson Carioca 6'		Gabriel Baralhas 13'	Stadium: Estádio José Maria de Campos Maia; Referee: Bruno Arleu de Araújo

3 August 2025 18	Vitória	2–2	Palmeiras	Salvador
19:30 UTC−3	Renato Kayzer 34'; Erick 65'	Report	Piquerez 70' (pen.); López 86'	Stadium: Barradão; Attendance: 17,729; Referee: Davi de Oliveira Lacerda (Espírito Santo)

9 August 2025 19	São Paulo	2–0	Vitória	São Paulo
18:30 UTC−3	Bobadilla 20'; Sabino 86'	Report		Stadium: Morumbi; Attendance: 39,283; Referee: Bruno Arleu de Araújo

16 August 2025 20	Vitória	2–2	Juventude	Salvador
18:30 UTC−3	Renato Kayzer 32', 46'	Report	Igor Formiga 81'; Nenê 90+10' (pen.)	Stadium: Barradão

25 August 2025 21	Flamengo	8–0	Vitória	Rio de Janeiro
21:00 (UTC-3)	Samuel Lino 2', 50'; Pedro 3', 47', 59' de Arrascaeta 34'; Luiz Araújo 54'; Bruno Henrique 81' (pen.)	Report		Stadium: Estádio Jornalista Mário Filho (Maracanã); Attendance: 57,249; Referee: Felipe Fernandes de Lima

31 August 2025 22	Vitória	1–0	Atlético Mineiro	Salvador
18:30 (UTC-3)	Erick 6'	Report		Stadium: Estádio Manoel Barradas (Barradão); Attendance: 28,898; Referee: Alex Gomes Stefano

13 September 2025 23	Fortaleza	2–0	Vitória	Fortaleza
16:00 (UTC-3)	Breno Lopes 31'; Bruno Pacheco 47'	Report		Stadium: Estádio Manoel Barradas (Castelão); Attendance: 29,137; Referee: Edina Alves Batista

20 September 2025 24	Vitória	0–1	Fluminense	Salvador
16:00 (UTC-3)		Report	Hércules 37'	Stadium: Estádio Manoel Barradas (Barradão); Attendance: 27,467; Referee: Matheus Delgado Candançan

28 September 2025 25	Grêmio	3–1	Vitória	Porto Alegre
11:00 (UTC-3)	André Henrique 45+3'; Amuzu 67'; Aravena 89'	Report	Cantalapiedra 49'	Stadium: Arena do Grêmio; Attendance: 41,025; Referee: Raphael Claus

2 October 2025 26	Vitória	1–0	Ceará	Salvador
19:00 (UTC-3)	Zé Marcos 18'	Report		Stadium: Estádio Manoel Barradas (Barradão); Attendance: 16,001; Referee: Matheus Delgado Candançan

5 October 2025 27	Vasco da Gama	4–3	Vitória	Rio de Janeiro
16:00 (UTC-3)	Moreira 6'; Rayan 52', 68' (pen.); Gabriel 90+7'	Report	Cantalapiedra 26'; Lucas Halter 34'; Cáceres 72'	Stadium: Estádio Vasco da Gama (São Januário); Attendance: 19,850; Referee: Fernando Salles Nascimento Filho

16 October 2025 28	Vitória	2–1	Bahia	Salvador
21:30 (UTC-3)	Renato Kayzer 26' (pen.); Cáceres 64'	Report	Tiago 41'	Stadium: Estádio Manoel Barradas (Barradão); Attendance: 28,027; Referee: Anderson Daronco

20 October 2025 29	Santos	0–1	Vitória	Santos
21:30 (UTC-3)		Report	Matheuzinho 41' (pen.)	Stadium: Estádio Urbano Caldeira (Vila Belmiro); Attendance: 11,775; Referee: Rafael Rodrigo Klein

25 October 2025 30	Vitória	0–1	Corinthians	Salvador
16:00 (UTC-3)		Report	Charles 87'	Stadium: Estádio Manoel Barradas (Barradão); Attendance: 28,070; Referee: Wilton Pereira Sampaio

1 November 2025 31	Cruzeiro	3–1	Vitória	Belo Horizonte
19:00 (UTC-3)	Kaio Jorge 8' (pen.), 23'; Arroyo 45'	Report	Willian Oliveira 37'	Stadium: Mineirão; Attendance: 59,587; Referee: Jefferson Ferreira de Moraes

5 November 2025 32	Vitória	1–0	Internacional	Salvador
19:00 (UTC-3)	Lucas Halter 67'	Report		Stadium: Estádio Manoel Barradas (Barradão); Attendance: 21,725; Referee: Felipe Fernandes de Lima

9 November 2025 33	Vitória	0–0	Botafogo	Salvador
19:00 (UTC-3)		Report		Stadium: Estádio Manoel Barradas (Barradão); Attendance: 28,264; Referee: Anderson Daronco

19 November 2025 37*	Palmeiras	0–0	Vitória	São Paulo
19:30 (UTC-3)		Report		Stadium: Allianz Parque; Attendance: 39,080; Referee: Lucas Paulo Torezin

23 November 2025 35	Sport	1–3	Vitória	Recife
18:30 (UTC-3)	Pablo 29'	Report	Luan Cândido 13' (o.g.); Cantalapiedra 15'; Renato Kayzer 48'	Stadium: Estádio Adelmar da Costa Carvalho (Ilha do Retiro); Attendance: 3,813; Referee: Yuri Elino Ferreira da Cruz

29 November 2025 36	Vitória	2–0	Mirassol	Salvador
19:00 (UTC-3)	Lucas Halter 25'; Matheuzinho 90' (pen.)	Report		Stadium: Estádio Manoel Barradas (Barradão); Referee: Wilton Pereira Sampaio

3 December 2025 34*	Red Bull Bragantino	4–0	Vitória	Bragança Paulista
19:00 (UTC-3)	Eduardo Sasha 6', 8'; Lucas Barbosa 51'; Jhon Jhon 65'	Report		Stadium: Estádio Cícero de Souza Marques; Attendance: 2,755; Referee: Wagner do Nascimento Magalhães

7 December 2025 38	Vitória	1–0	São Paulo	Salvador
16:00 (UTC-3)	Gabriel Baralhas 68'	Report		Stadium: Estádio Manoel Barradas (Barradão); Attendance: 29,538; Referee: Wilton Pereira Sampaio

=== Campeonato Baiano ===
==== Results by round ====
Round	1	2	3
Ground	H	A	H
Result	D	W	D
Position			

Updated to match(es) played on 19 January 2025. Source:
A = Away; H = Home; W = Win; D = Draw; L = Loss

11 January 2025 1	Vitória	0–0	Barcelona de Ilhéus	Salvador
16:00 UTC−3		Report		Stadium: Barradão; Attendance: 8,955; Referee: Emerson Souza Silva

15 January 2025 2	Juazeirense	1–4	Vitória	Juazeiro
21:30 UTC−3	Patrick Carvalho 90'	Report	Bruno Xavier 10'; Wesley 55' (o.g.); Janderson 69'; Osvaldo 77' (pen.)	Stadium: Estádio Adauto Moraes; Attendance: 1,633; Referee: Emerson Ricardo de Almeida Andrade

19 January 2025 3	Vitória	1–1	Jacuipense	Salvador
16:00 UTC−3	Fabrício 90+8'	Report	Flavinho 49'	Stadium: Barradão; Referee: Wagner Francisco Silva Souza

25 January 2025 4	Colo Colo	1–4	Vitória	Salvador
18:30 UTC−3	Wesley 61'	Report	Gustavo Mosquito 18'; Janderson 41'; Wellington Rato 50'; Fabrício 90+3'	Stadium: Arena Fonte Nova; Referee: Diego Pombo Lopez

29 January 2025 5	Vitória	4–0	Jacobina	Salvador
21:30 UTC−3	Bruno Xavier 14'; Fabrício 59'; Claudinho 89'; Matheuzinho 90+3'	Report		Stadium: Barradão; Referee: Bruno Nogueira Prado

1 February 2025 6	Bahia	0–0	Vitória	Salvador
16:00 UTC−3		Report		Stadium: Arena Fonte Nova; Referee: Bruno Pereira Vasconcelos

8 February 2025 7	Vitória	2–1	Porto	Salvador
18:30 UTC−3	Fabrício 12'; Carlinhos 90'	Report	Adriano 20'	Stadium: Barradão; Attendance: 11,248; Referee: Emerson Ricardo de Almeida Andrade

16 February 2025 8	Vitória	2–0	Jequié	Salvador
16:00 UTC−3	Willian Oliveira 40'; Janderson 44'	Report		Stadium: Barradão; Attendance: 10,399; Referee: Reinaldo Silva de Santana

22 February 2025 9	Atlético de Alagoinhas	0–1	Vitória	Alagoinhas
18:30 UTC−3		Report	Val Soares 9'	Stadium: Estádio Antônio Carneiro; Referee: Josué Reis de Jesus Júnior

==== Semi-finals ====
1 March 2025 First Leg	Atlético de Alagoinhas	0–4	Vitória	Alagoinhas
18:30		Report	Lucas Halter 14'; Lucas Braga 45+5'; Jamerson 67'; Gustavo Silva 78'	Stadium: Estádio Municipal Antônio de Figueiredo; Referee: Wagner Francisco Silva Souza

8 March 2025 Second Leg	Vitória	3–0 (7–0 agg.)	Atlético de Alagoinhas	Salvador
18:00	Janderson 53'; Thiaguinho 59'; Carlinhos 70'	Report		Stadium: Barradão

==== Finals ====
16 March 2025 First Leg	Bahia	2–0	Vitória	Salvador
	Xavier 7'; Pulga 45+2'	Report		Stadium: Arena Fonte Nova; Referee: Rafael Rodrigo Klein

23 March 2025 Second Leg	Vitória	1–1 (1–3 agg.)	Bahia	Salvador
	Claudinho 84'	Report	Kayky 90+18'	Stadium: Barradão; Referee: Wilton Pereira Sampaio

=== Copa do Brasil ===
25 February 2025 First Round	Maranhão	0–1	Vitória	São Luís
19:00		Report	Gabriel Baralhas 80'	Stadium: Castelão; Attendance: 673; Referee: Bruno Arleu de Araújo (Rio de Janeiro)

12 March 2025 Second Round	Vitória	0–2	Náutico	Salvador
19:00		Report	Borges 27'; Buiú 36'	Stadium: Barradão; Referee: Paulo César Zanovelli da Silva (Minas Gerais)

=== Copa do Nordeste ===
==== Group stage ====
Pos	Team	Pld	W	D	L	GF	GA	GD	Pts	Qualification
1	(Bahia) Vitória	7	4	3	0	10	6	+4	15	Advance to Quarter-finals
2	(Pernambuco) Sport	7	4	0	3	11	7	+4	12	Advance to Quarter-finals
3	(Ceará) Ferroviário	7	3	1	3	8	10	−2	10	Advance to Quarter-finals
4	(Ceará) Fortaleza	7	3	0	4	11	7	+4	9	Advance to Quarter-finals
5	(Alagoas) CRB	7	2	3	2	12	10	+2	9	

Source: CBF

22 January 2025 1	CRB	2–2	Vitória	Maceió
21:30 (UTC-3)				Stadium: Estádio Rei Pelé; Attendance: 3,862; Referee: Fabio Augusto Santos Sá Junior

4 February 2025 2	Vitória	1–0	Sousa	Salvador
21:30 (UTC-3)				Stadium: Barradão; Attendance: 8,270; Referee: Michelangelo Martins de Almeida Junior

11 February 2025 3	Vitória	2–1	Ferroviário	Salvador
19:00 (UTC-3)				Stadium: Barradão; Attendance: 10,171; Referee: Antonio Dib Moraes de Sousa

19 February 2025 4	Fortaleza	1–2	Vitória	Fortaleza
21:30 (UTC-3)	Lucero 40'	Report	Mosquito 53'; Baralhas 80'	Stadium: Castelão; Attendance: 11,949; Referee: Dênis da Silva Ribeiro Serafim

5 March 2025 5	Vitória	1–1	Altos	Salvador
21:30 (UTC-3)				Stadium: Barradão; Attendance: 7,850; Referee: Léo Simão Holanda

19 March 2025 6	Vitória	1–0	Sport	Salvador
21:30 (UTC-3)	Janderson 45+2'	Report		Stadium: Barradão; Attendance: 9,770; Referee: Antônio Dib Moares de Souza

26 March 2025 7	Moto Club	1–1	Vitória	São Luís
21:30 (UTC-3)				Stadium: Castelão; Attendance: 408; Referee: Fabio Augusto Santos Sá Junior

==== Final stages ====
8 July 2025 Quarter-finals	Vitória	0–1	Confiança	Salvador
21:30		Report	Rafinha 90'	Stadium: Barradão; Referee: Paulo José Souza Mourão

=== Copa Sudamericana ===
==== Group Stage ====
Pos	Team	Pld	W	D	L	GF	GA	GD	Pts	Qualification	UCA	CRL	VIT	DYJ
1	(Ecuador) Universidad Católica	6	4	2	0	12	5	+7	14	Advance to round of 16	—	3–1	1–0	3–1
2	(Uruguay) Cerro Largo	6	2	1	3	5	8	−3	7	Advance to knockout round play-offs	1–3	—	0–1	0–0
3	(Brazil) Vitória	6	1	3	2	3	4	−1	6		1–1	0–1	—	1–1
4	(Argentina) Defensa y Justicia	6	0	4	2	4	7	−3	4		1–1	1–2	0–0	—

Source: CONMEBOL

2 April 2025 1	Vitória (Brazil)	1–1	(Ecuador) Universidad Católica	Salvador, Brazil
21:30 UTC−3	Matheuzinho 76' (pen.)	Report	Londoño 54'	Stadium: Barradão; Referee: José Cabero (Chile)

10 April 2025 2	Defensa y Justicia (Argentina)	0–0	(Brazil) Vitória	Gobernador Costa, Argentina
19:00 UTC−3		Report		Stadium: Estadio Norberto Tomaghello; Referee: Augusto Menéndez (Peru)

23 April 2025 3	Vitória (Brazil)	0–1	(Uruguay) Cerro Largo	Salvador, Brazil
21:30 UTC−3		Report	Peraza 75'	Stadium: Barradão; Referee: José Méndez (Paraguay)

6 May 2025 4	Vitória (Brazil)	1–1	(Argentina) Defensa y Justicia	Salvador, Brazil
19:00 UTC−3	Edu 36'	Report	Togni 55'	Stadium: Barradão; Referee: Francisco Gilabert (Chile)

14 May 2025 5	Cerro Largo (Uruguay)	0–1	(Brazil) Vitória	Montevideo, Uruguay
21:30 UTC−3		Report	Claudinho 83'	Stadium: Estadio Centenario; Referee: Joel Alarcón (Peru)

28 May 2025 6	Universidad Católica (Ecuador)	1–0	(Brazil) Vitória	Quito, Ecuador
19:30 UTC−5	Baralhas 75' (o.g.)	Report		Stadium: Estadio Olímpico Atahualpa; Referee: Yender Herrera (Venezuela)
