= Paulo Roberto (footballer, born November 2005) =

Brazilian footballer

Personal information
- Full name: Paulo Roberto dos Santos Almeida
- Date of birth: 13 November 2005 (age 20)
- Place of birth: Brazil
- Height: 1.77 m (5 ft 10 in)
- Position: Right-back

Team information
- Current team: Cianorte (on loan from Vitória)

Youth career
- Vitória

Senior career*
Years	Team	Apps	(Gls)
2024–	Vitória	3	(0)
2024	→ Itabuna (loan)	11	(0)
2026–	→ Cianorte (loan)	9	(0)
- * Club domestic league appearances and goals as of 21:43, 1 November 2026 (UTC)

Paulo Roberto dos Santos Almeida (born 13 November 2005), known as Paulo Roberto, is a Brazilian footballer who plays as a right-back for Vitória.

== Career ==
A Vitória youth graduate, Paulo Roberto was loaned to Série D side Itabuna in April 2024 along with several teammates, after a partnership between both clubs was established. Regularly used, he returned to his parent club in August after Itabuna's elimination from the competition, and renewed his contract until 2026 on 13 August 2025.

Paulo Roberto made his first team – and Série A – debut on 31 August 2025, starting in a 1–0 home win over Atlético Mineiro. The following 29 March, he was loaned to Cianorte for the remainder of the season.

== Career statistics ==
As of 1 November 2026

Club	Season	League			State league		Cup		Continental		Other		Total	
Club	Season	Division	Apps	Goals	Apps	Goals	Apps	Goals	Apps	Goals	Apps	Goals	Apps	Goals
Itabuna	2024	Série D	11	0	—		—		—		—		11	0
Vitória	2025	Série A	1	0	—		—		—		—		1	0
Vitória	2026	Série A	0	0	2	0	0	0	—		—		2	0
Vitória	Total		1	0	2	0	0	0	—		—		3	0
Cianorte	2026	Série D	9	0	—		—		—		3 (Note: Appearance(s) in Copa Sul-Sudeste)	0	12	0
Career total			21	0	0	0	0	0	0	0	3	0	24	0
