= Gean (footballer) =

Brazilian footballer

Personal information
- Full name: Gean de Jesus Soares
- Date of birth: 11 June 2007 (age 19)
- Place of birth: Salvador, Brazil
- Height: 1.76 m (5 ft 9 in)
- Position: Right-back

Team information
- Current team: Vitória
- Number: 59

Youth career
- Vitória

Senior career*
| Years | Team | Apps | (Gls) |
| 2025– | Vitória | 4 | (0) |
- * Club domestic league appearances and goals as of 21:20, 1 November 2026 (UTC)

Gean de Jesus Soares (born 11 June 2007), simply known as Gean, is a Brazilian footballer who plays as a right-back for Vitória.

== Career ==
A Vitória youth graduate, Gean made his first team debut on 26 March 2025, coming on as a second-half substitute for Edenilson in a 1–1 Copa do Nordeste away draw against Moto Club. He only appeared with the main squad again in the following year, and was promoted to the first team in September 2026, after Fabiano suffered a serious injury.

Gean made his Série A debut on 31 October 2026, starting in a 2–0 away loss to Coritiba.

== Personal life ==
Gean's older brother Eric Soares is also a footballer. An attacking midfielder, he too played for Vitória as a youth.

== Career statistics ==
As of 1 November 2026

| Club | Season | League | | | State league | | Cup | | Continental | | Other | | Total | |
| Club | Season | Division | Apps | Goals | Apps | Goals | Apps | Goals | Apps | Goals | Apps | Goals | Apps | Goals |
|---|---|---|---|---|---|---|---|---|---|---|---|---|---|---|
| Vitória | 2025 | Série A | 0 | 0 | 0 | 0 | 0 | 0 | — | | 1 (Note: Appearance(s) in Copa do Nordeste) | 0 | 1 | 0 |
| Vitória | 2026 | Série A | 1 | 0 | 3 | 0 | 0 | 0 | — | | 1 | 0 | 5 | 0 |
| Career total | | | 1 | 0 | 3 | 0 | 0 | 0 | 0 | 0 | 2 | 0 | 6 | 0 |
