= Maykon Jesus =

Brazilian footballer

Personal information
- Full name: Maykon Kesley de Jesus Ramalho
- Date of birth: 7 December 2005 (age 20)
- Place of birth: Maceió, Brazil
- Position: Left-back

Team information
- Current team: Novorizontino (on loan from Atlético Mineiro)
- Number: 66

Youth career
- 2020: Retrô
- 2021–2024: Atlético Mineiro

Senior career*
Years	Team	Apps	(Gls)
2025–	Atlético Mineiro	0	(0)
2025	→ Noroeste (loan)	11	(0)
2025	→ Vitória (loan)	9	(0)
2026–	→ Novorizontino (loan)	34	(1)
- * Club domestic league appearances and goals as of 17 November 2026

Maykon Kesley de Jesus Ramalho (born 7 December 2005), known as Maykon Jesus, is a Brazilian footballer who plays as a left-back for Novorizontino, on loan from Atlético Mineiro.

== Career ==
Born in Maceió, Alagoas, Maykon Jesus began his career with Retrô before moving to the youth categories of Atlético Mineiro in 2021. On 17 December 2024, he was loaned to Noroeste for the 2025 Campeonato Paulista.

Maykon Jesus played in 11 of Noroeste's 12 matches in the Paulistão, before moving on loan to Vitória on 11 April 2025, with a buyout clause. He made his first team – and Série A – debut on 12 June, coming on as a first-half substitute for injured Jamerson in a 0–0 home draw against Cruzeiro.

== Career statistics ==
As of 21 July 2025

Club	Season	League			State League		Cup		Continental		Other		Total	
Club	Season	Division	Apps	Goals	Apps	Goals	Apps	Goals	Apps	Goals	Apps	Goals	Apps	Goals
Noroeste	2025	Paulista	—		11	0	—		—		—		11	0
Vitória	2025	Série A	4	0	—		—		0	0	1 (Note: Appearance(s) in Copa do Nordeste)	0	5	0
Career total			4	0	11	0	0	0	0	0	1	0	16	0
