= Caíque Geloni =

Brazilian footballer

Personal information
- Full name: Caíque Hélio Geloni
- Date of birth: 18 July 2004 (age 22)
- Place of birth: Sertãozinho, Brazil
- Height: 1.88 m (6 ft 2 in)
- Positions: Centre-back; right-back

Youth career
- 2021: Novorizontino
- 2022: União de Iacanga
- 2022: Botafogo-SP
- 2023: Ituano
- 2023: Rio Claro

Senior career*
Years	Team	Apps	(Gls)
2024–2025	Rio Claro	19	(0)
2024	→ Itabuna (loan)	14	(0)
2024	→ Vitória (loan)	0	(0)
2025–2026	São José-SP	0	(0)
2026	→ Paraná (loan)	13	(0)
- * Club domestic league appearances and goals as of 13:02, 28 July 2026 (UTC)

Caíque Hélio Geloni (born 18 July 2004), known as Caíque Geloni or just Caíque, is a Brazilian professional footballer who plays as either a centre-back or a right-back.

== Career ==
Born in Sertãozinho, São Paulo, Caíque represented local sides Novorizontino, União de Iacanga, Botafogo-SP and Ituano before finishing his formation with Rio Claro. Promoted to the first team of the latter for the 2023 season, he made his senior debut in the year's Campeonato Paulista Série A2.

In April 2024, after establishing himself as a starter for Rio Claro, Caíque moved on loan to Vitória, but was assigned to affiliate club Itabuna after both clubs established a partnership. He finished the year with Vitória's under-23 squad, before returning to Rio Claro in December.

On 11 June 2025, Caíque was announced at São José-SP for the Copa Paulista. The following 28 January, he was loaned to Paraná Clube for the Campeonato Paranaense Second Division.

Back to São José for the state cup, Caíque featured in five matches before leaving the club by mutual consent in August 2026.

== Career statistics ==
As of 31 August 2026

Club	Season	League			State League		Cup		Continental		Other		Total	
Club	Season	Division	Apps	Goals	Apps	Goals	Apps	Goals	Apps	Goals	Apps	Goals	Apps	Goals
Rio Claro	2024	Paulista A2	—		5	0	—		—		—		5	0
Rio Claro	2025	Paulista A2	—		14	0	—		—		—		14	0
Rio Claro	Total	Paulista A2	—		19	0	—		—		—		19	0
Itabuna (loan)	2024	Série D	14	0	—		—		—		—		14	0
São José-SP	2025	Paulista A2	—		—		—		—		7 (Note: Appearance(s) in Copa Paulista)	0	7	0
São José-SP	2026	Paulista A2	—		—		—		—		5	0	5	0
São José-SP	Total		—		—		—		—		12	0	12	0
Paraná (loan)	2026	Paranaense 2ª Divisão	—		13	0	—		—		—		13	0
Career total			14	0	32	0	0	0	0	0	12	0	58	0
