= José Breno =

Brazilian footballer

Personal information
- Full name: José Breno Silva Costa
- Date of birth: 6 June 2004 (age 22)
- Place of birth: Brazil
- Height: 1.70 m (5 ft 7 in)
- Position: Midfielder

Team information
- Current team: Vitória
- Number: 55

Youth career
- 2017–2024: Vitória

Senior career*
Years	Team	Apps	(Gls)
2024–	Vitória	6	(0)
2024	→ Itabuna (loan)	9	(1)
2025	→ Londrina (loan)	21	(0)
- * Club domestic league appearances and goals as of 8 April 2026

José Breno Silva Costa (born 6 June 2004), known as José Breno, is a Brazilian footballer who plays as a midfielder for Vitória.

== Career ==
Born in Santa Catarina but raised in Ipirá, Bahia, José Breno joined Vitória's youth setup in 2017, aged 13. He made his first team debut on 14 February 2024, coming on as a late substitute for Dudu in a 2–0 away loss to Juazeirense, for the year's Copa do Nordeste.

In April 2024, José Breno moved on loan to Série D side Itabuna along with several Vitória players, after a partnership between both clubs was established. After impressing for the side, he was recalled in July.

José Breno made his Série A debut on 28 July 2024, replacing Léo Naldi late into a 2–0 away win over Palmeiras but being sent off later in the match. On 15 August, he renewed his contract until 2026.

== Career statistics ==
As of 22 August 2024

Club	Season	League			State league		Cup		Continental		Other		Total	
Club	Season	Division	Apps	Goals	Apps	Goals	Apps	Goals	Apps	Goals	Apps	Goals	Apps	Goals
Vitória	2024	Série A	1	0	0	0	0	0	—		1 (Note: Appearance(s) in Copa do Nordeste)	2	0	
Itabuna (loan)	2024	Série D	9	1	—		—		—		—		9	1
Career total			10	1	0	0	0	0	0	0	1	0	11	1
