= Fábio Soares =

Brazilian footballer

Personal information
- Full name: Fábio Soares dos Santos
- Date of birth: 3 December 2004 (age 21)
- Place of birth: Laje, Brazil
- Height: 1.78 m (5 ft 10 in)
- Position: Forward

Team information
- Current team: Ferroviária
- Number: 7

Youth career
- Camaçariense
- Vitória

Senior career*
Years	Team	Apps	(Gls)
2023–2025	Vitória	6	(0)
2025–	Ferroviária	37	(7)
- * Club domestic league appearances and goals as of 9 November 2026

Fábio Soares dos Santos (born 3 December 2004), sometimes known as Fau, is a Brazilian footballer who plays as a forward for Ferroviária.

== Career ==
Born in Laje, Bahia, Fábio Soares was a Vitória youth graduate. He made his first team debut on 22 March 2023, coming on as a half-time substitute in a 2–1 away loss to Campinense, for the year's Copa do Nordeste.

On 25 October 2023, after returning to the under-20s, Fábio Soares renewed his contract with the Leão da Barra until March 2026. Definitely promoted to the main squad in January 2024, he made his Série A debut on 20 June of that year, replacing Luan in a 4–2 home win over Atlético Mineiro.

On 10 June 2025, Fábio Soares joined Ferroviária on a contract until July 2027.

== Career statistics ==
As of 9 November 2026

Club	Season	League			State league		Cup		Continental		Other		Total	
Club	Season	Division	Apps	Goals	Apps	Goals	Apps	Goals	Apps	Goals	Apps	Goals	Apps	Goals
Vitória	2023	Série B	0	0	—		—		—		1 (Note: Appearance(s) in Copa do Nordeste)	0	1	0
Vitória	2024	Série A	3	0	1	0	0	0	—		1	0	5	0
Vitória	2025	Série A	0	0	1	0	0	0	—		0	0	1	0
Vitória	Total		3	0	2	0	0	0	—		2	0	7	0
Ferroviária	2025	Série B	4	1	—		—		—		—		4	1
Ferroviária	2026	Série C	20	3	13	3	—		—		—		33	6
Ferroviária	Total		24	4	13	3	—		—		—		37	7
Career total			27	4	15	3	0	0	0	0	2	0	44	7
