= Pablo Baianinho =

Brazilian footballer

Personal information
- Full name: Pablo Santos de Alcantara
- Date of birth: 3 August 2003 (age 23)
- Place of birth: Brotas, Brazil
- Height: 1.75 m (5 ft 9 in)
- Position: Attacking midfielder

Team information
- Current team: Paysandu (on loan from Vitória)
- Number: 80

Youth career
- 2019: Boavista
- 2020–2023: Jacuipense

Senior career*
Years	Team	Apps	(Gls)
2023–2024	Jacuipense	14	(2)
2024	→ Vitória (loan)	0	(0)
2024–	Vitória	13	(2)
2025	→ Guarani (loan)	4	(0)
2026–	→ Paysandu (loan)	11	(1)
- * Club domestic league appearances and goals as of 9 November 2026

Pablo Santos de Alcantara (born 3 August 2003), known as Pablo Baianinho or just Pablo, is a Brazilian footballer who plays as an attacking midfielder for Paysandu, on loan from Vitória.

== Career ==
Born in Brotas, São Paulo, Pablo began his career in a football school in Bahia before joining Boavista for their under-17 squad. He moved to Jacuipense before making his first team debut in 2023.

On 6 March 2024, Pablo was loaned to Série A side Vitória. In April, despite not featuring in a single minute for the club, he signed a permanent four-year contract with the club after they bought 50% of his economic rights.

Pablo made his Leão da Barra, and top tier, debut on 20 June 2024, coming on as a late substitute for Raúl Cáceres in a 4–2 home win over Atlético Mineiro.

== Career statistics ==
As of 18 February 2025

Club	Season	League			State league		Cup		Continental		Other		Total	
Club	Season	Division	Apps	Goals	Apps	Goals	Apps	Goals	Apps	Goals	Apps	Goals	Apps	Goals
Jacuipense	2023	Série D	6	0	0	0	—		—		—		6	0
Jacuipense	2024	Série D	0	0	8	2	1	1	—		1 (Note: Appearance(s) in Copa do Nordeste)	0	10	3
Jacuipense	Total		6	0	8	2	1	1	—		1	0	16	3
Vitória	2024	Série A	3	0	—		—		—		0	0	3	0
Vitória	2025	Série A	0	0	3	0	0	0	0	0	0	0	3	0
Vitória	Total		3	0	3	0	0	0	0	0	0	0	6	0
Career total			9	0	11	2	1	1	0	0	1	0	22	3
