= Matheuzinho =

Matheuzinho is a diminutive of the Portuguese name Matheus. It may refer to:

- Matheuzinho (footballer, born 1993), Matheus Cotulio Bossa, Brazilian football attacking midfielder
- Matheuzinho (footballer, born 1997), Matheus Martins Fogaça de Paula, Brazilian football attacking midfielder/forward
- Matheuzinho (footballer, born 2000), Matheus França Silva, Brazilian football right-back

== See also ==
- Matheusinho (born 1998), Matheus Leonardo Sales Cardoso, Brazilian football attacking midfielder
