= Edenilson (footballer, born 2005) =

Brazilian footballer

Personal information
- Full name: Edenilson Santos Nascimento Filho
- Date of birth: 17 June 2005 (age 21)
- Place of birth: Brazil
- Height: 1.82 m (6 ft 0 in)
- Positions: Centre-back; defensive midfielder

Team information
- Current team: Vitória
- Number: 26

Youth career
- Jacuipense
- 2023: Atlântico-BA
- 2023–2025: Vitória

Senior career*
Years	Team	Apps	(Gls)
2024–	Vitória	21	(0)
2024	→ Itabuna (loan)	13	(2)
- * Club domestic league appearances and goals as of 21:10, 1 November 2026 (UTC)

Edenilson Santos Nascimento Filho (born 17 June 2005), simply known as Edenilson, is a Brazilian footballer who plays as either a centre-back or a defensive midfielder for Vitória.

== Career ==
After playing for the youth sides of Jacuipense and Atlântico Esporte Clube, Edenilson joined the youth sides of Vitória in March 2023. In January 2024, he was promoted to the first team for trainings.

In April 2024, Edenilson moved on loan to Série D side Itabuna along with several Vitória players, after a partnership between both clubs was established. Back to his parent club in August, he played for the under-23 team.

Edenilson made his first team debut with Vitória on 29 January 2025, coming on as a second-half substitute for Gabriel Baralhas in a 4–0 Campeonato Baiano home routing of Jacobina. On 22 February 2026, after receiving more chances in the 2026 Campeonato Baiano, he renewed his contract until December 2028.

== Career statistics ==
As of 1 November 2026

Club	Season	League			State league		Cup		Continental		Other		Total	
Club	Season	Division	Apps	Goals	Apps	Goals	Apps	Goals	Apps	Goals	Apps	Goals	Apps	Goals
Itabuna	2024	Série D	13	2	—		—		—		—		13	2
Vitória	2025	Série A	0	0	1	0	0	0	—		1 (Note: Appearance(s) in Copa do Nordeste)	0	2	0
Vitória	2026	Série A	12	0	8	0	3	0	—		6	0	29	0
Vitória	Total		12	0	9	0	3	0	—		7	0	31	0
Career total			25	2	9	0	3	0	0	0	7	0	44	2
