= Léo Naldi =

Brazilian footballer

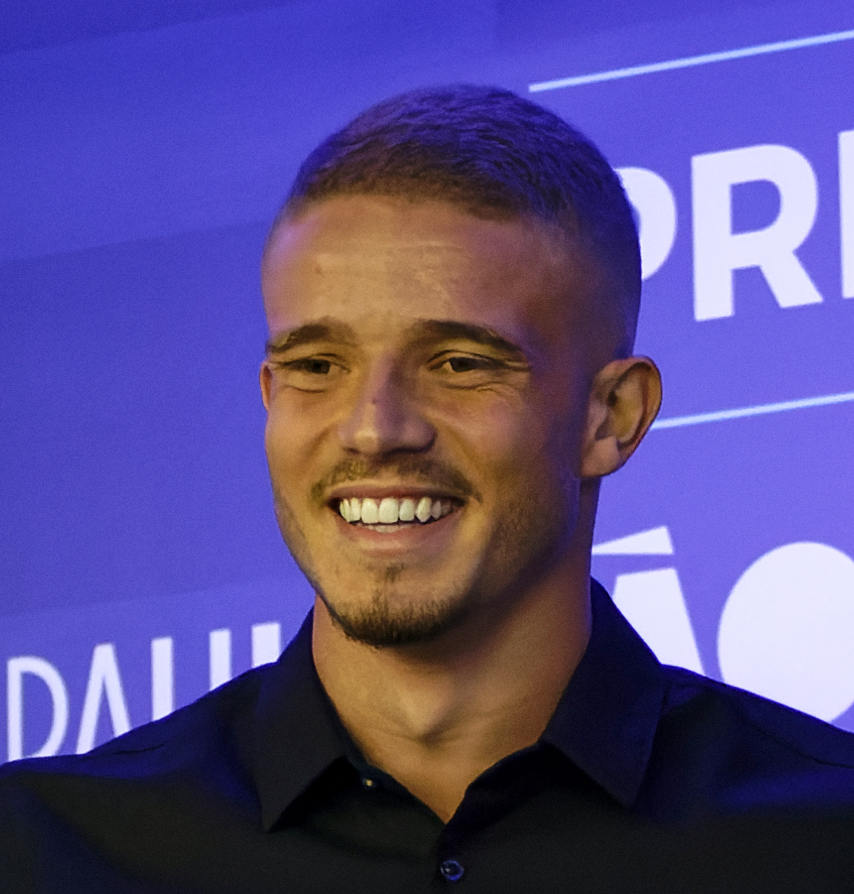

Personal information
- Full name: Leonardo Naldi de Matos
- Date of birth: 18 August 2001 (age 25)
- Place of birth: Pindamonhangaba, Brazil
- Height: 1.77 m (5 ft 10 in)
- Position: Defensive midfielder

Team information
- Current team: Novorizontino (on loan from Vitória)
- Number: 18

Youth career
- 2013–2020: Taubaté
- 2020: Ponte Preta

Senior career*
| Years | Team | Apps | (Gls) |
| 2018–2020 | Taubaté | 0 | (0) |
| 2020–2024 | Ponte Preta | 127 | (9) |
| 2024– | Vitória | 23 | (0) |
| 2025 | → Atlético Goianiense (loan) | 11 | (0) |
| 2025 | → Criciúma (loan) | 22 | (0) |
| 2026– | → Novorizontino (loan) | 40 | (2) |
- * Club domestic league appearances and goals as of 12:38, 3 November 2026 (UTC)

Leonardo Naldi de Matos (born 18 August 2001), known as Léo Naldi, is a Brazilian footballer who plays as a defensive midfielder for Novorizontino, on loan from Vitória.

== Career ==
=== Early career ===
Born in Pindamonhangaba, São Paulo, Léo Naldi began his career with a futsal team in his hometown before joining Taubaté's youth setup in 2013. His first – and only – appearance with the main squad occurred on 1 September 2018, as he came on as a late substitute in a 1–0 home win over São Bernardo, for the year's Copa Paulista.

=== Ponte Preta ===
Léo Naldi moved to Ponte Preta in 2020, initially for the under-20 team. He made his first team debut on 29 January 2021, replacing Igor Maduro in a 7–2 away routing of Figueirense, in the last round of the 2020 Série B.

On 19 February 2021, Léo Naldi renewed his contract with Ponte until December 2024. He scored his first professional goal on 13 March, netting the winner in a 1–0 Campeonato Paulista away success over Botafogo-SP; it was also the first start of his career.

On 11 May 2022, after establishing himself as a regular starter, Léo Naldi further extended his link until July 2025.

=== Vitória ===
On 5 March 2024, Léo Naldi signed a three-year contract with Vitória, for a rumoured fee of R$ 3 million. He made his Série A debut on 21 April, starting in a 2–2 home draw against Bahia.

After failing to establish himself as a starter, Léo Naldi was loaned to Atlético Goianiense on 30 January 2025. Back from loan in June, he renewed his contract with Vitória until 2027, and moved to Criciúma on loan shortly after.

On 2 January 2026, Léo Naldi was announced at Novorizontino also in a temporary one-year deal.

== Career statistics ==
As of 3 November 2026

| Club | Season | League | | | State League | | Cup | | Continental | | Other | | Total | |
| Club | Season | Division | Apps | Goals | Apps | Goals | Apps | Goals | Apps | Goals | Apps | Goals | Apps | Goals |
|---|---|---|---|---|---|---|---|---|---|---|---|---|---|---|
| Taubaté | 2018 | Paulista A2 | — | | 0 | 0 | — | | — | | 1 (Note: Appearance(s) in Copa Paulista) | 0 | 1 | 0 |
| Ponte Preta | 2020 | Série B | 1 | 0 | — | | — | | — | | 6 | 0 | 7 | 0 |
| Ponte Preta | 2021 | Série B | 17 | 4 | 8 | 1 | 2 | 0 | — | | — | | 27 | 5 |
| Ponte Preta | 2022 | Série B | 33 | 1 | 12 | 0 | 1 | 0 | — | | — | | 46 | 1 |
| Ponte Preta | 2023 | Série B | 28 | 1 | 17 | 2 | 2 | 0 | — | | — | | 47 | 3 |
| Ponte Preta | 2024 | Série B | — | | 11 | 0 | — | | — | | — | | 11 | 0 |
| Ponte Preta | Total | | 79 | 6 | 48 | 3 | 5 | 0 | — | | 6 | 0 | 138 | 9 |
| Vitória | 2024 | Série A | 21 | 0 | — | | 2 | 0 | — | | 3 (Note: Appearance(s) in Copa do Nordeste) | 0 | 26 | 0 |
| Vitória | 2025 | Série A | — | | 2 | 0 | 0 | 0 | — | | 0 | 0 | 2 | 0 |
| Vitória | Total | | 21 | 0 | 2 | 0 | 2 | 0 | — | | 3 | 0 | 28 | 0 |
| Atlético Goianiense (loan) | 2025 | Série B | 7 | 0 | 4 | 0 | 1 | 0 | — | | — | | 12 | 0 |
| Criciúma (loan) | 2025 | Série B | 22 | 0 | — | | — | | — | | — | | 22 | 0 |
| Novorizontino (loan) | 2026 | Série B | 29 | 1 | 11 | 1 | 2 | 0 | — | | — | | 42 | 2 |
| Career total | | | 158 | 7 | 65 | 4 | 10 | 0 | 0 | 0 | 10 | 0 | 243 | 11 |

== Honours ==
=== Club ===
Ponte Preta

- Campeonato Paulista Série A2: 2023

Novorizontino

- Campeonato Brasileiro Série B: 2026

=== Individual ===
- Campeonato Paulista Série A2 Team of the year: 2023
