= Marco Antônio (footballer, born September 2000) =

Brazilian footballer (born 2000)

Personal information
- Full name: Marco Antônio da Silva Carvalho
- Date of birth: 24 September 2000 (age 26)
- Place of birth: Santo Antônio de Jesus, Brazil
- Height: 1.78 m (5 ft 10 in)
- Positions: Centre-back; defensive midfielder

Team information
- Current team: Floresta
- Number: 27

Youth career
- 2013–2021: Vitória

Senior career*
Years	Team	Apps	(Gls)
2021–	Vitória	41	(3)
2024	→ Portuguesa (loan)	4	(0)
2024	→ Náutico (loan)	7	(0)
2024	→ Londrina (loan)	12	(0)
2021–	Floresta	13	(0)
- * Club domestic league appearances and goals as of 9 November 2026

Marco Antônio da Silva Carvalho (born 24 September 2000), known as Marco Antônio, is a Brazilian professional footballer who plays as either a centre-back or a defensive midfielder for Floresta.

== Career ==
Born in Santo Antônio de Jesus, Bahia, Marco Antônio joined Vitória's youth setup at the age of 12. He made his first team debut on 2 May 2021, coming on as a second-half substitute in a 2–1 Campeonato Baiano home loss to Jacuipense.

On 19 January 2022, Marco Antônio renewed his contract with the Leão until December 2023, being definitely promoted to the main squad. A backup option under head coach Dado Cavalcanti, he became a starter under Fabiano Soares, and scored his first senior goal on 1 May, netting the winner in a 1–0 home success over Manaus.

On 31 January 2023, after helping Vitória in their promotion to the Série B, Marco Antônio further extended his contract with the club until 2024. However, he lost his starting spot during the year as the club achieved a second consecutive promotion.

On 17 January 2024, Marco Antônio renewed his contract with Vitória until 2025, and moved on loan to Portuguesa two days later.

== Career statistics ==
As of 18 March 2024.

Club	Season	League			State League		Cup		Continental		Other		Total	
Club	Season	Division	Apps	Goals	Apps	Goals	Apps	Goals	Apps	Goals	Apps	Goals	Apps	Goals
Vitória	2021	Série C	1	0	1	0	0	0	—		0	0	2	0
Vitória	2022	Série C	21	3	2	0	1	0	—		0	0	24	3
Vitória	2023	Série B	12	0	4	0	0	0	—		6 (Note: Appearances in the Copa do Nordeste)	0	22	0
Vitória	Total		34	3	7	0	1	0	—		6	0	48	3
Portuguesa (loan)	2024	Paulista	—		4	0	—		—		—		4	0
Career total			34	3	11	0	1	0	0	0	6	0	52	3

== Honours ==
Vitória

- Campeonato Brasileiro Série B: 2023
