= Luis Miguel (footballer, born 2005) =

Brazilian footballer

Personal information
- Full name: Luis Miguel Borges de Paula
- Date of birth: 4 February 2005 (age 21)
- Place of birth: Iguatu, Brazil
- Height: 1.70 m (5 ft 7 in)
- Position: Forward

Team information
- Current team: Trofense
- Number: 17

Youth career
- 2017–2024: Vitória

Senior career*
Years	Team	Apps	(Gls)
2024–2026	Vitória	6	(1)
2024	→ Itabuna (loan)	10	(1)
2025	→ Botafogo-PB (loan)	13	(2)
2025	→ Chapecoense B (loan)		
2026	→ Caxias (loan)	3	(0)
2026–	Trofense	3	(0)
- * Club domestic league appearances and goals as of 12 September 2026

Luis Miguel Borges de Paula (born 4 February 2005), known as Luis Miguel, is a Brazilian footballer who plays as a forward for Portuguese Liga 3 club Trofense.

== Career ==
Born in Iguatu, Ceará, Luis Miguel joined Vitória's youth setup in 2017, aged 12, and signed his first professional contract with the club in June 2021. He made his first team debut on 14 February 2024, coming on as a late substitute for Zé Hugo in a 2–0 away loss to Juazeirense, for the year's Copa do Nordeste.

In April 2024, Luis Miguel moved on loan to Série D side Itabuna along with several Vitória players, after a partnership between both clubs was established. After impressing for the side, he was recalled in July.

Luis Miguel made his Série A debut on 21 July 2024, replacing Matheuzinho in a 2–0 away loss to Grêmio.

== Career statistics ==
As of 20 August 2024

Club	Season	League			State league		Cup		Continental		Other		Total	
Club	Season	Division	Apps	Goals	Apps	Goals	Apps	Goals	Apps	Goals	Apps	Goals	Apps	Goals
Vitória	2024	Série A	1	0	0	0	0	0	—		1 (Note: Appearance(s) in Copa do Nordeste)	0	2	0
Itabuna (loan)	2024	Série D	10	1	—		—		—		—		10	1
Career total			11	1	0	0	0	0	0	0	1	0	12	1
