= Janderson (footballer, born May 1999) =

Brazilian footballer

Personal information
- Full name: Janderson de Carvalho Costa
- Date of birth: 6 May 1999 (age 27)
- Place of birth: São João de Meriti, Brazil
- Height: 1.89 m (6 ft 2 in)
- Position: Forward

Team information
- Current team: Göztepe
- Number: 39

Youth career
- Inhumas

Senior career*
Years	Team	Apps	(Gls)
2020–2021	Angra dos Reis	17	(1)
2021	Duque de Caxias	5	(0)
2022	São José-MA	9	(6)
2022	Bahia de Feira	15	(7)
2022–2024	Botafogo	29	(4)
2024–2025	Vitória	64	(11)
2025–	Göztepe	32	(6)
- * Club domestic league appearances and goals as of 10 June 2026

Janderson de Carvalho Costa (born 6 May 1999), simply known as Janderson, is a Brazilian footballer who plays as a forward for Süper Lig club Göztepe.

== Club career ==
=== Early career ===
Janderson was born in São João de Meriti, Rio de Janeiro, but played for Inhumas as a youth. Back to his native state, he made his senior debut with Angra dos Reis and played for Duque de Caxias before joining São José-MA for the 2022 season.

After scoring six goals in the 2022 Campeonato Maranhense, Janderson moved to Série D side Bahia de Feira in April of that year, and was the club's top scorer in the competition with seven goals.

=== Botafogo ===
On 8 August 2022, Janderson signed for Botafogo and was initially assigned to the under-23 team. Promoted to the first team for the 2023 season, he renewed his contract with Bota until 2025 on 10 April 2023, and made his debut with the main squad ten days later, coming on as a second-half substitute for Tiquinho Soares in a 4–0 Copa Sudamericana home routing of Universidad César Vallejo. Seven days after that, he scored his first goal for the club, netting the second in a 2–0 win over Ypiranga-RS also at the Estádio Olímpico Nilton Santos, for the year's Copa do Brasil.

Janderson made his Série A debut on 11 May 2023, again replacing Tiquinho in a 3–0 home win over Corinthians. He scored his first goal in the category on 6 December, but in a 3–1 away loss to Internacional.

=== Vitória ===
On 19 April 2024, Janderson signed a contract with fellow top tier side Vitória until December 2027, for a rumoured fee of R$ 5 million.

== Career statistics ==
As of 29 February 2024.

Club	Season	League			State League		Cup		Continental		Other		Total	
Club	Season	Division	Apps	Goals	Apps	Goals	Apps	Goals	Apps	Goals	Apps	Goals	Apps	Goals
Angra dos Reis	2020	Carioca Série A2	—		13	1	—		—		—		13	1
Angra dos Reis	2021	Carioca Série A2	—		4	0	—		—		—		4	0
Angra dos Reis	Total		—		17	1	—		—		—		17	1
Duque de Caxias	2021	Carioca Série B1	—		5	0	—		—		—		5	0
São José-MA	2022	Maranhense	—		9	6	—		—		—		9	6
Bahia de Feira	2022	Série D	15	7	—		—		—		—		15	7
Botafogo	2023	Série A	18	1	0	0	1	1	7 (Note: Appearance(s) in Copa Sudamericana)	1	—		26	3
Botafogo	2024	Série A	0	0	11	1	0	0	3 (Note: Appearance(s) in Copa Libertadores)	0	—		14	1
Botafogo	Total		18	1	11	1	1	1	10	1	—		40	4
Vitória	2024	Série A	15	4	—		0	0	—		—		0	0
Career total			33	8	40	8	1	1	10	1	0	0	86	18
