= Lucas Arcanjo =

Brazilian footballer

Personal information
- Full name: Lucas Willians Assis Arcanjo
- Date of birth: 8 August 1998 (age 28)
- Place of birth: Piritiba, Brazil
- Height: 1.89 m (6 ft 2 in)
- Position: Goalkeeper

Team information
- Current team: Vitória
- Number: 1

Youth career
- 2014–2015: Galícia
- 2016–2019: Vitória

Senior career*
Years	Team	Apps	(Gls)
2019–	Vitória	215	(0)
- * Club domestic league appearances and goals as of 21:38, 1 November 2026 (UTC)

Lucas Willians Assis Arcanjo (born 8 August 1998) is a Brazilian professional footballer who plays as a goalkeeper for Vitória.

== Club career ==
Arcanjo's father Geraldo was a football goalkeeper in Brazil, and inspired Lucas to follow in his footsteps. From the age of 8 to 14 Arcanjo trained football in his family farm, before moving to Galícia in 2014, and finally joining Vitória's academy in 2015. He was promoted to Vitória's senior team in 2019, also splitting time with their U23s. On 23 April 2021, he extended his contract with the club until 2023. In July 2022, he suffered a shoulder injury that kept him out for the remainder of the season.

Arcanjo returned for the 2023 as they were promoted back to the Série B and was the only constant starter for the season. In May 2023, he hit 100 professional appearances with Vitória. On 27 July 2023, he extended his contract with the club until 2026.

== Career statistics ==
As of 1 November 2026

Appearances and goals by club, season and competition
Club	Season	League			Campeonato Baiano		Copa do Brasil		Continental		Copa do Nordeste		Total	
Club	Season	Division	Apps	Goals	Apps	Goals	Apps	Goals	Apps	Goals	Apps	Goals	Apps	Goals
Vitória	2019	Série B	1	0	0	0	0	0	—		0	0	1	0
Vitória	2020	Série B	0	0	3	0	1	0	—		1	0	5	0
Vitória	2021	Série B	30	0	3	0	5	0	—		9	0	47	0
Vitória	2022	Série C	13	0	9	0	4	0	—		0	0	26	0
Vitória	2023	Série B	36	0	4	0	1	0	—		6	0	47	0
Vitória	2024	Série A	37	0	8	0	2	0	—		3	0	50	0
Vitória	2025	Série A	29	0	9	0	2	0	6 (Note: Appearance(s) in Copa do Nordeste)	0	5	0	51	0
Vitória	2026	Série A	29	0	4	0	6	0	—		9	0	48	0
Career total			175	0	40	0	21	0	6	0	33	0	275	0

== Honours ==
=== Club ===
Vitória

- Campeonato Brasileiro Série B: 2023
- Campeonato Baiano: 2024
- Copa do Nordeste: 2026
