= Lawan (footballer) =

Brazilian footballer

Personal information
- Full name: Lawan Kennyd Gabriel Santos
- Date of birth: 25 May 2005 (age 21)
- Place of birth: Aracaju, Brazil
- Height: 1.80 m (5 ft 11 in)
- Position: Forward

Team information
- Current team: Vitória
- Number: 33

Youth career
- Confiança
- 2021–2023: Bahia
- 2024: Vitória

Senior career*
| Years | Team | Apps | (Gls) |
| 2024– | Vitória | 3 | (0) |
| 2024 | → Campinense (loan) | 5 | (0) |
| 2024 | → Itabuna (loan) | 9 | (5) |
- * Club domestic league appearances and goals as of 22:42, 20 August 2024 (UTC)

Lawan Kennyd Gabriel Santos (born 25 May 2005), simply known as Lawan, is a Brazilian footballer who plays as a forward for Vitória.

== Career ==
Born in Aracaju, Sergipe, Lawan joined Vitória's youth setup in October 2023, after playing for rivals Bahia and hometown side Confiança. On 29 January 2024, he was loaned to Campinense for the Campeonato Paraibano.

In April 2024, after being rarely used, Lawan moved to Série D side Itabuna along with several Vitória players, after a partnership between both clubs was established. After impressing for the side, he was recalled in July.

Lawan made his first team – and Série A – debut on 21 July 2024, coming on as a half-time substitute for Alerrandro in a 2–0 away loss to Grêmio. On 7 August, he renewed his contract until 2027.

== Career statistics ==
As of 20 August 2024

| Club | Season | League | | | State league | | Cup | | Continental | | Other | | Total | |
| Club | Season | Division | Apps | Goals | Apps | Goals | Apps | Goals | Apps | Goals | Apps | Goals | Apps | Goals |
|---|---|---|---|---|---|---|---|---|---|---|---|---|---|---|
| Vitória | 2024 | Série A | 3 | 0 | — | | — | | — | | — | | 3 | 0 |
| Campinense (loan) | 2024 | Paraibano | — | | 5 | 0 | — | | — | | — | | 5 | 0 |
| Itabuna (loan) | 2024 | Série D | 9 | 5 | — | | — | | — | | — | | 9 | 5 |
| Career total | | | 12 | 5 | 5 | 0 | 0 | 0 | 0 | 0 | 0 | 0 | 17 | 5 |
