= Vitória, Salvador =

Coordinates: 12.9963°S 38.5274°W

Vitória
- Residential district
- Interactive map of Vitória
- Country: Brazil
- State: Bahia
- Municipality: Salvador
- Time zone: UTC-3 (BRT)

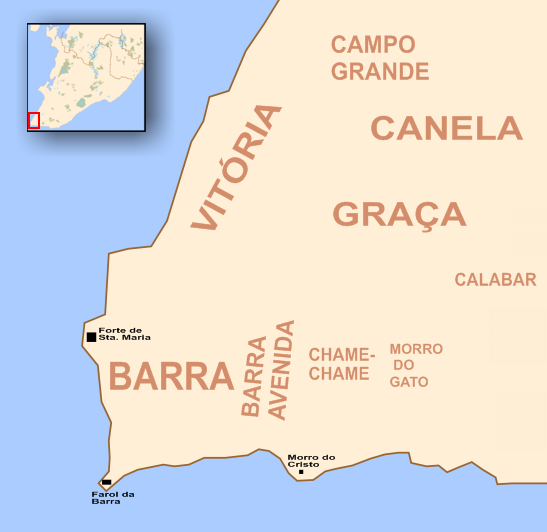
Vitória.

Vitória is a neighborhood in Salvador, the capital of the Brazilian state of Bahia. Made up mainly of upper‑middle‑class and upper‑class residents, it is geographically positioned along the slope that borders the entrance to the Bay of All Saints. It is one of the neighborhoods with the highest price per square meter in Salvador.

Vitória connects Salvador’s Old City (the historic center) to Barra, where the coastal shoreline begins. It is a traditional neighborhood whose rural occupation dates back to the late 16th century. In the 1940s, it became one of the main gathering spots for Bahian artists and intellectuals, a characteristic that grew stronger after the founding of the University of Bahia. Within less than one kilometer of total length, the Corredor da Vitória is home to the Bahia Museum of Art, the Carlos Costa Pinto Museum, and the Bahia Geological Museum. Vitória is one of the most valued urban areas in Brazil’s Northeast.
