= Yuri Sena =

Brazilian footballer

Personal information
- Full name: Yuri Sena dos Reis Batista
- Date of birth: 3 January 2001 (age 25)
- Place of birth: Salvador, Brazil
- Height: 1.90 m (6 ft 3 in)
- Position: Goalkeeper

Team information
- Current team: Vitória
- Number: 71

Youth career
- Vitória

Senior career*
Years	Team	Apps	(Gls)
2020–	Vitória	14	(0)
2024	→ CSA (loan)	10	(0)
2025	→ Azuriz (loan)	2	(0)
2025	→ Jequié (loan)	3	(0)
- * Club domestic league appearances and goals as of 8 April 2026

Yuri Sena dos Reis Batista (born 3 January 2001), known as Yuri Sena or simply Yuri, is a Brazilian footballer who plays as a goalkeeper for Vitória.

== Club career ==
Born in Salvador, Yuri was a Vitória youth graduate. Promoted to the first team for the 2020 season, he was initially a fourth-choice behind Ronaldo, César and Lucas Arcanjo.

On 11 December 2020, as both César and Lucas Arcanjo tested positive for COVID-19, Yuri made his professional debut, coming on as a first-half substitute for injured Ronaldo in a 0–1 home loss against Cruzeiro for the Série B championship.

== International career ==
In 2017, Yuri was called up to Brazil under-17s for the Montaigu Tournament and the FIFA U-17 World Cup, being a backup option in both competitions. In 2019, he was called up to the full side by manager Tite to complete the trainings ahead of the 2019 Copa América.

== Career statistics ==
As of 16 December 2020

Club	Season	League			State League		Cup		Continental		Other		Total	
Club	Season	Division	Apps	Goals	Apps	Goals	Apps	Goals	Apps	Goals	Apps	Goals	Apps	Goals
Vitória	2020	Série B	2	0	0	0	0	0	—		0	0	2	0
Career total			2	0	0	0	0	0	0	0	0	0	2	0
