= Raúl Cáceres =

Paraguayan footballer (born 1991)

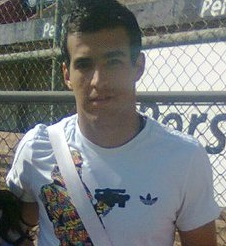

Personal information
- Full name: Raúl Alejandro Cáceres Bogado
- Date of birth: 18 September 1991 (age 35)
- Place of birth: Asunción, Paraguay
- Height: 1.80 m (5 ft 11 in)
- Position: Right-back

Team information
- Current team: Olimpia
- Number: 27

Youth career
- 2002–2010: Olimpia

Senior career*
Years	Team	Apps	(Gls)
2010–2011	Olimpia	20	(0)
2012–2013	Sportivo Carapeguá	55	(4)
2014–2015	Sol de América	88	(1)
2016–2020	Cerro Porteño	114	(6)
2019	→ Vasco da Gama (loan)	23	(0)
2020–2021	Cruzeiro	55	(3)
2022	América Mineiro	34	(1)
2023	Guaraní	36	(2)
2024–2025	Vitória	53	(2)
2026–	Olimpia	1	(0)

International career
2011	Paraguay U20	4	(0)
- * Club domestic league appearances and goals as of 13 December 2025

Raúl Alejandro Cáceres Bogado (born 18 September 1991) is a Paraguayan footballer who plays as a right-back for Paraguayan club Olimpia.

== Career ==
=== Club career ===
Raúl is the son of legendary Olimpia defender Virginio Cáceres. Raúl made his professional debut with Olimpia then play with Carapeguá, Sol de América and since 2016 in Cerro Porteño.

== International career ==
Raúl was named in Paraguay's provisional squad for Copa América Centenario but was cut from the final squad.
