= Fabrício (footballer, born October 2000) =

Brazilian footballer

Personal information
- Full name: Fabrício do Rosário dos Santos
- Date of birth: 8 October 2000 (age 26)
- Place of birth: Cachoeira do Sul, Brazil
- Height: 1.89 m (6 ft 2 in)
- Position: Forward

Team information
- Current team: Vitória
- Number: 23

Youth career
- 2017: São Paulo-RS
- 2018–2020: Brasil de Pelotas
- 2019–2020: → Grêmio (loan)

Senior career*
Years	Team	Apps	(Gls)
2019–2020	Brasil de Pelotas	4	(0)
2020–2022	Grêmio	2	(0)
2021	→ Brasil de Pelotas (loan)	15	(3)
2021–2022	→ Celta B (loan)	30	(7)
2022–2025	Levante	34	(4)
2022–2023	→ Castellón (loan)	34	(2)
2025–	Vitória	36	(4)
- * Club domestic league appearances and goals as of 8 April 2026

Fabrício do Rosário dos Santos (born 8 October 2000), simply known as Fabrício, or Fabri, is a Brazilian professional footballer who plays as a forward for Vitória.

== Club career ==
=== Brasil de Pelotas ===
Born in Cachoeira do Sul, Brazil, Fabrício joined Brasil de Pelotas' youth sides in 2018, from São Paulo-RS. He made his first team debut with the former on 10 February 2019, coming on as a late substitute in a 3–1 Campeonato Gaúcho home loss against Aimoré.

Fabrício made his Campeonato Brasileiro Série B debut in the match against Londrina on 4 May 2019.

=== Grêmio ===
Fabrício joined the Grêmio's Academy at the age of 18 in 2019; initially on loan, he signed a permanent contract with the club in February 2020. He made his first team debut on 7 September 2020, replacing Isaque late into a 1–1 away draw against Atlético Goianiense.

On 30 April 2021, after being already out of the first team squad, Fabrício returned to his former side Brasil on loan until the end of the year. On 27 August, however, he moved abroad and joined Spanish Primera División RFEF club Celta de Vigo B on a one-year loan deal.

=== Levante ===
On 29 August 2022, Fabrício signed a five-year contract with Segunda División side Levante UD, and was immediately loaned out to third division club CD Castellón for the 2022–23 season.

== Career statistics ==
=== Club ===
As of 25 November 2021.

Appearances and goals by club, season and competition
Club	Season	League			State League		National Cup		Continental		Other		Total	
Club	Season	Division	Apps	Goals	Apps	Goals	Apps	Goals	Apps	Goals	Apps	Goals	Apps	Goals
Brasil de Pelotas	2019	Série B	1	0	3 (Note: Appearance(s) in Campeonato Gaúcho.)	0	2	0	—		—		6	0
Grêmio	2020	Série A	2	0	—		2	0	0	0	—		4	0
Grêmio	2021	Série A	—		—		—		—		—		0	0
Grêmio	Total		2	0	—		2	0	0	0	—		4	0
Brasil de Pelotas (loan)	2021	Série B	15	3	—		—		—		—		15	3
Celta B (loan)	2021–22	Primera División RFEF	9	0	—		—		—		—		9	0
Career total			27	3	3	0	4	0	0	0	0	0	34	3

== Honours ==
Grêmio

- Campeonato Gaúcho: 2020, 2021
