= Dudu (footballer, born June 1999) =

Brazilian footballer

Personal information
- Full name: Eduardo Marcelo Rodrigues Nunes
- Date of birth: 5 June 1999 (age 27)
- Place of birth: São Vicente, Brazil
- Height: 1.86 m (6 ft 1 in)
- Position: Defensive midfielder

Team information
- Current team: Vitória
- Number: 21

Youth career
- Santos

Senior career*
Years	Team	Apps	(Gls)
2018	Santos	0	(0)
2019	Athletico Paranaense	0	(0)
2019	PSTC	0	(0)
2020	Tupã	6	(1)
2021	Ação	6	(2)
2021–2022	Ferroviário	34	(0)
2022	→ Fortaleza (loan)	0	(0)
2023	Volta Redonda	13	(0)
2023	→ Vitória (loan)	20	(0)
2024–	Vitória	33	(1)
2024	→ Novorizontino (loan)	8	(0)
2025	→ Ponte Preta (loan)	22	(2)
- * Club domestic league appearances and goals as of 8 April 2026

Eduardo Marcelo Rodrigues Nunes (born 5 June 1999), commonly known as Dudu, is a Brazilian professional footballer who plays as a defensive midfielder for Vitória.

== Club career ==
Born in São Vicente, São Paulo, Dudu was a Santos youth graduate. On 9 January 2019, after playing twice with the B-team in the previous year's Copa Paulista, he signed a three-year contract with Athletico Paranaense.

Dudu left Athletico on 21 March 2019, without featuring a single minute for the club, and joined PSTC on 5 April 2019. On 21 September 2020, he moved to Tupã.

In February 2021, Dudu agreed to a contract with Assisense, but signed for Ação on 17 April. On 27 May, he was presented at Série C side Ferroviário.

On 15 March 2022, Fortaleza announced the signing of Dudu on loan from Ferroviário, with a buyout clause. Initially assigned to their under-23 team, he returned to Ferrão on 11 July, after making no appearances.

On 24 November 2022, Dudu signed for Volta Redonda. On 2 June of the following year, he moved to Vitória on loan.

On 7 November 2023, Vitória exercised Dudu's buyout clause, acquiring 70% of his economic rights. However, he struggled with off-field problems during the 2024 season, being separated from the squad in July, and loaned to Novorizontino on 20 August.

On 31 December 2024, Dudu agreed to a one-year loan deal with Ponte Preta.

== Career statistics ==
As of 11 February 2025

Club	Season	League			State League		Cup		Continental		Other		Total	
Club	Season	Division	Apps	Goals	Apps	Goals	Apps	Goals	Apps	Goals	Apps	Goals	Apps	Goals
Santos	2018	Série A	0	0	0	0	0	0	—		2 (Note: Appearance(s) in Copa Paulista)	0	2	0
Athletico Paranaense	2019	Série A	0	0	0	0	0	0	—		—		0	0
PSTC	2019	Paranaense Série Prata	—		0	0	—		—		—		0	0
Tupã	2020	Paulista 2ª Divisão	—		6	1	—		—		—		6	1
Ação	2021	Mato-Grossense	—		6	2	—		—		—		6	2
Ferroviário	2021	Série C	15	0	—		—		—		3 (Note: Appearance(s) in Copa do Nordeste)	0	18	0
Ferroviário	2022	Série C	5	0	14	0	1	0	—		—		20	0
Ferroviário	Subtotal		20	0	14	0	1	0	—		3	0	38	0
Fortaleza (loan)	2022	Série A	0	0	—		—		—		—		0	0
Volta Redonda	2023	Série C	2	0	11	0	4	1	—		—		17	1
Vitória	2023	Série B	20	0	—		—		—		—		20	0
Vitória	2024	Série A	5	0	11	0	2	0	—		5	0	23	0
Vitória	Subtotal		25	0	11	0	2	0	—		5	0	43	0
Novorizontino (loan)	2024	Série B	8	0	—		—		—		—		8	0
Ponte Preta (loan)	2025	Série C	0	0	6	0	0	0	—		—		6	0
Career total			55	0	54	3	7	1	0	0	10	0	128	4
