= Gabriel Baralhas =

Brazilian footballer (born 1998)

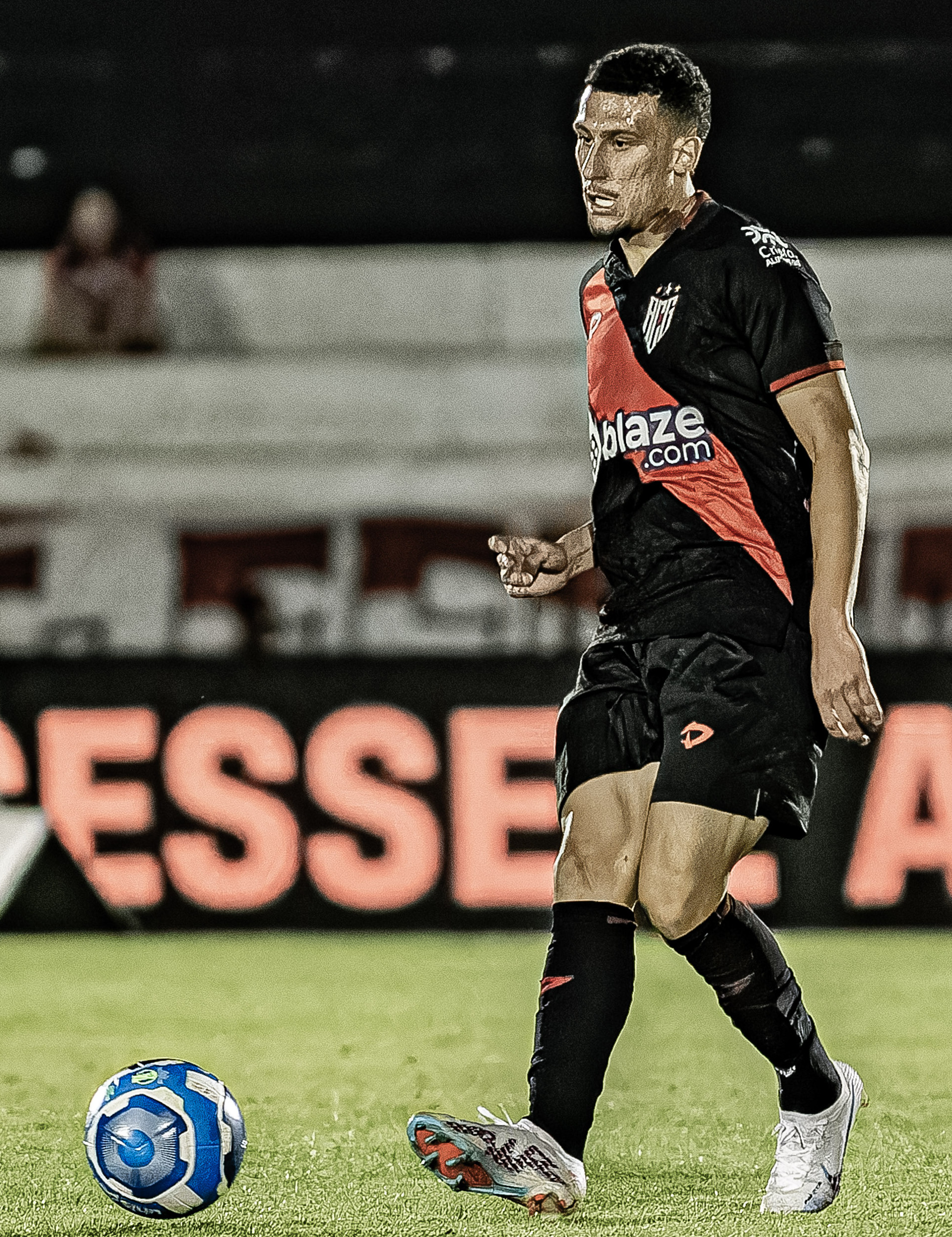
- Baralhas with Atlético Goianiense in 2023

Personal information
- Full name: Gabriel Baralhas dos Santos
- Date of birth: 10 October 1998 (age 28)
- Place of birth: Botucatu, Brazil
- Height: 1.78 m (5 ft 10 in)
- Position: Central midfielder

Team information
- Current team: Vitória

Youth career
- 2013–2017: Ituano

Senior career*
Years	Team	Apps	(Gls)
2017–2021	Ituano	50	(3)
2017	→ Guarani de Palhoça (loan)	13	(1)
2018	→ Atlético Paranaense (loan)	0	(0)
2019	→ Bragantino (loan)	3	(0)
2020–2021	→ Atlético Goianiense (loan)	55	(5)
2022–2023	Atlético Goianiense	58	(6)
2023–2024	Internacional	13	(0)
2023–2024	→ Atlético Goianiense (loan)	65	(8)
2025	Atlético Goianiense	0	(0)
2025	→ Vitória (loan)	35	(2)
2026–	Vitória	14	(3)
- * Club domestic league appearances and goals as of 8 April 2026

Gabriel Baralhas dos Santos (born 10 October 1998), known as Gabriel Baralhas, is a Brazilian footballer who plays as a central midfielder for Vitória.

== Career statistics ==
As of 13 October 2021

Club	Season	League			State League		Cup		Conmebol		Other		Total	
Club	Season	Division	Apps	Goals	Apps	Goals	Apps	Goals	Apps	Goals	Apps	Goals	Apps	Goals
Ituano	2017	Série D	0	0	2	0	—		—		—		2	0
Ituano	2018	Paulista	—		14	2	—		—		—		14	2
Ituano	2019	Série D	—		13	0	—		—		—		13	0
Ituano	2020	Série C	9	1	12	0	—		—		—		21	1
Ituano	Total		9	1	41	2	—		—		—		50	3
Guarani de Palhoça (loan)	2017	Catarinense Série B	—		11	1	—		—		—		11	1
Atlético Paranaense (loan)	2018	Série A	0	0	—		0	0	—		—		0	0
Bragantino (loan)	2019	Série B	3	0	—		—		—		—		3	0
Atlético Goianiense (loan)	2020	Série A	4	0	1	0	1	0	—		3 (Note: Appearance(s) in Copa Verde)	0	9	0
Atlético Goianiense (loan)	2021	Série A	23	3	11	1	3	0	1 (Note: Appearance(s) in Copa Sudamericana)	0	—		38	4
Atlético Goianiense (loan)	Total		27	3	12	1	4	0	1	0	3	0	47	4
Career total			39	4	64	4	4	0	1	0	3	0	111	8

== Honours ==
Atlético Goianiense

- Campeonato Goiano: 2020, 2022
