= Jamerson Bahia =

Brazilian footballer

Personal information
- Full name: Jamerson Santos de Jesus
- Date of birth: 9 September 1998 (age 28)
- Place of birth: Salvador, Brazil
- Height: 1.77 m (5 ft 10 in)
- Position: Left back

Team information
- Current team: Vitória (on loan from Coritiba)
- Number: 83

Youth career
- 2017–2018: Marília

Senior career*
Years	Team	Apps	(Gls)
2018	Marília	18	(0)
2018–2019	Portimonense	0	(0)
2019–2021	União Almeirim	35	(3)
2021–2022	Sertanense	14	(2)
2022	Azuriz	19	(1)
2022	→ Guarani (loan)	19	(0)
2023	Guarani	13	(1)
2023–	Coritiba	62	(2)
2025–	→ Vitória (loan)	23	(1)
- * Club domestic league appearances and goals as of 8 April 2026

Jamerson Santos de Jesus (born 9 September 1998), known as Jamerson Bahia or just Jamerson, is a Brazilian professional footballer who plays as a left back for Vitória, on loan from Coritiba.

== Personal life ==
Jamerson was born in Salvador, Bahia, and lived with his mother Luciana, his younger brother Leonardo, his grandmother Conceição and his uncle Lionel. He lost his mother and his uncle when travelling to seek an opportunity, with his grandmother and his brother also passing away later on.

== Club career ==
Jamerson had a failed trial at Avaí at the age of 15 before moving to Brasília, where he was also unable to join a club. His first club was Marília in 2017, as he played for the under-20s before being promoted to the first team in the following year.

After being a regular starter in the 2018 Campeonato Paulista Série A3, Jamerson moved abroad and joined Portimonense in Portugal, being initially assigned to the under-23 team. On 31 July 2019, he signed for União Almeirim, and helped in their promotion to the Campeonato de Portugal in his first season.

Jamerson started the 2021–22 season at Sertanense, before returning to his home country in February 2022 with Azuriz. On 20 July, he moved to Série B side Guarani on loan until the end of the year.

On 10 November 2022, after being the assist leader of the 2022 Série B, Jamerson signed a permanent deal with Bugre, as the club bought 50% of his economic rights for a rumoured fee of R$ 400,000. On 10 April 2023, he was announced at Série A side Coritiba on a contract until the end of 2025.

== Career statistics ==
As of 20 June 2023

Club	Season	League			State League		Cup		Continental		Other		Total	
Club	Season	Division	Apps	Goals	Apps	Goals	Apps	Goals	Apps	Goals	Apps	Goals	Apps	Goals
Marília	2018	Paulista A3	—		18	0	—		—		—		18	0
Portimonense	2018–19	Primeira Liga	0	0	—		0	0	—		0	0	0	0
União Almeirim	2019–20	AF Santarém 1ª Divisão	19	2	—		1	0	—		3 (Note: Appearance(s) in AF Santarém Taça Ribatejo)	0	23	2
União Almeirim	2020–21	Campeonato de Portugal	16	1	—		1	0	—		—		17	1
União Almeirim	Subtotal		35	3	—		2	0	—		3	0	40	3
Sertanense	2021–22	Campeonato de Portugal	14	2	—		2	0	—		—		16	2
Azuriz	2022	Série D	12	1	7	0	4	0	—		—		23	1
Guarani	2022	Série B	19	0	—		—		—		—		19	0
Guarani	2023	Série B	0	0	13	1	0	0	—		—		13	1
Guarani	Subtotal		19	0	13	1	0	0	—		—		32	1
Coritiba	2023	Série A	9	0	—		9	0	—		—		11	0
Career total			89	6	38	1	10	0	0	0	3	0	140	7
