= Barradão =

Football stadium in Salvador, Brazil

Coordinates: 12°55′09″S 38°25′38″W

Estádio Manoel Barradas
- Barradão
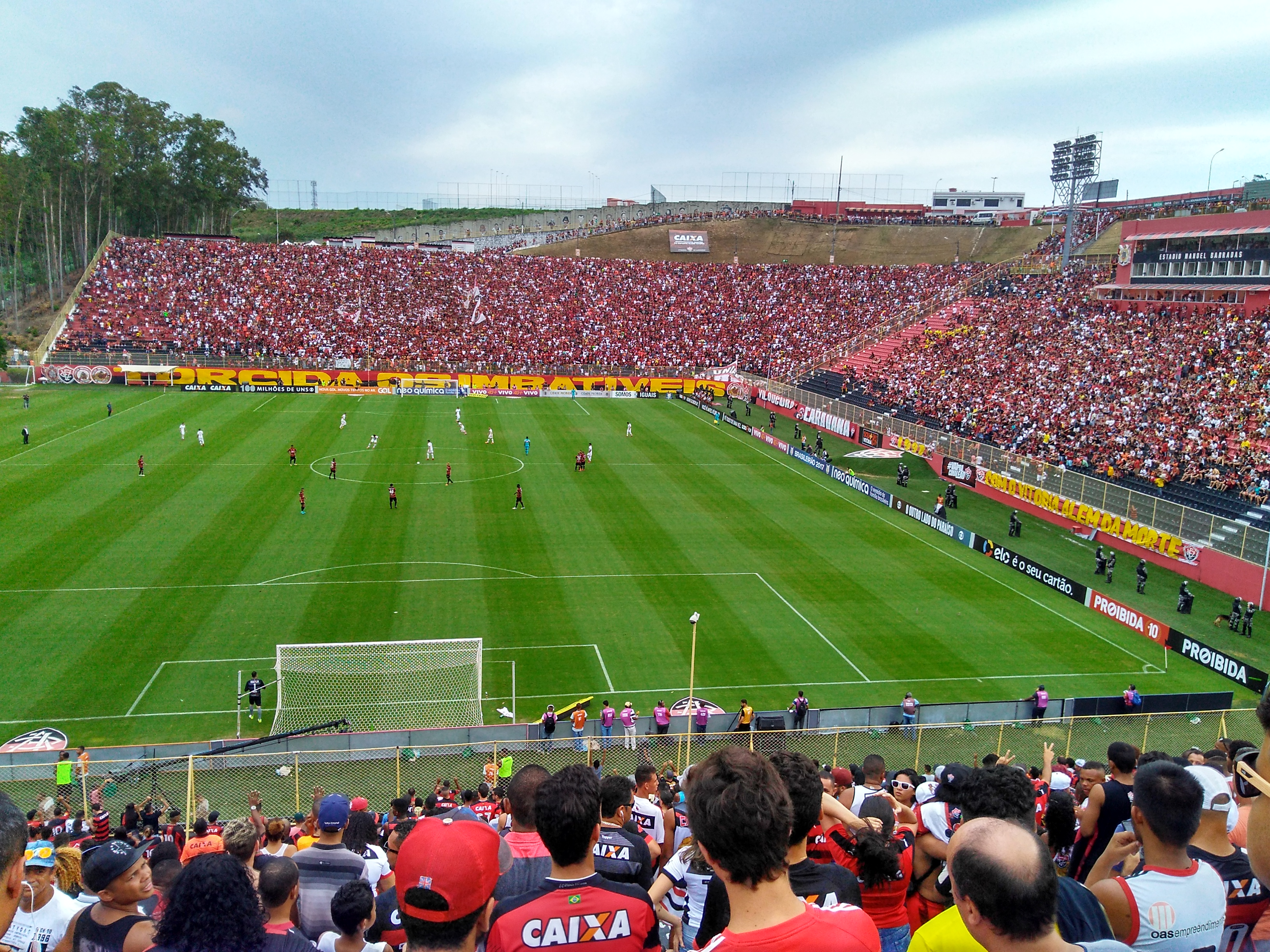
- Sisbrace
- Interactive map of Estádio Manoel Barradas
- Full name: Estádio de Futebol Manoel Barradas Carneiro “Barradão”
- Location: Salvador, Bahia, Brazil
- Owner: Vitória
- Operator: Vitória
- Capacity: 34,535
- Field size: 105 x 68m

Construction
- Built: 1986
- Renovated: 1991
- Cost: Cz$ 46.137.229,00 (in 2011, R$33.563.820,75)

Tenant
- Vitória

The Estádio de Futebol Manoel Barradas Carneiro “Barradão”, commonly known as the Estádio Manoel Barradas or Barradão, is a multi-purpose stadium in Salvador, Brazil. It is currently used mostly for football matches. The stadium has a current maximum capacity of 34,535 spectators. The stadium was built in 1986 and reinaugurated in 1991.

The Barradão is owned by Esporte Clube Vitória. The stadium is named after Manoel Barradas, who was a Vitória's counselor.

== History ==
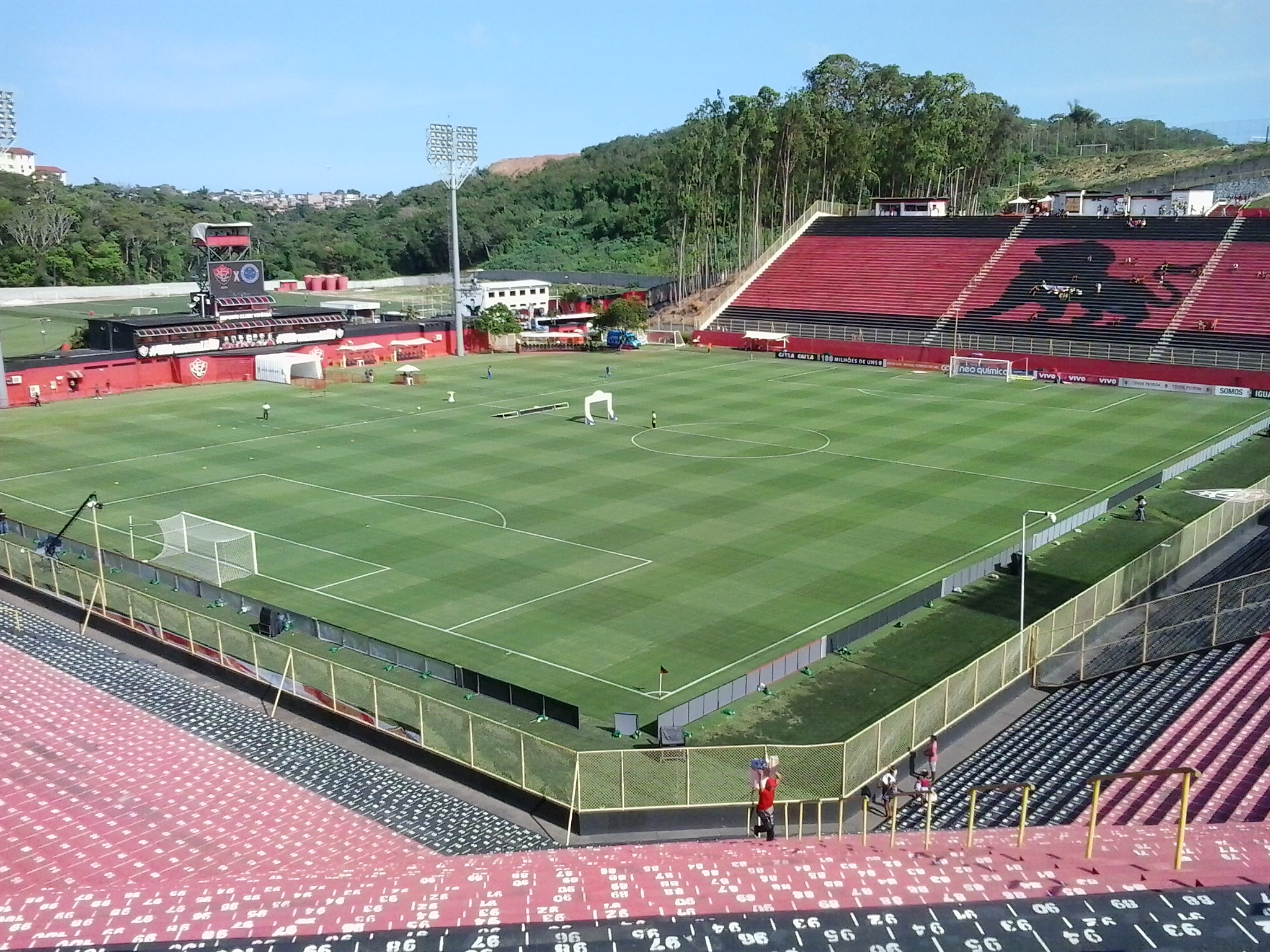
Panoramic view of the stadium in 2017

In 1986, the works on Barradão were completed. The inaugural match was played on November 9 of that year, when Vitória and Santos drew 1-1. The first goal of the stadium was scored by Santos' Dino.

In 1991, the stadium was reformed. The reinaugural match was played on August 25 of that year, when Vitória and Olimpia of Paraguay drew 1-1. The first goal of the stadium after the reinauguration was scored by Olimpia's Jorge Campos.

The stadium's attendance record currently stands at 51,756, set in 1999 when Vitória beat Atlético Mineiro 2–1.
