= Matheuzinho (footballer, born 1997) =

Brazilian footballer

Personal information
- Full name: Matheus Martins Fogaça de Paula
- Date of birth: 18 October 1997 (age 29)
- Place of birth: Capivari de Baixo, Brazil
- Height: 1.65 m (5 ft 5 in)
- Positions: Attacking midfielder; forward

Team information
- Current team: Vitória
- Number: 10

Youth career
- 2013–2017: Figueirense

Senior career*
Years	Team	Apps	(Gls)
2015–2020	Figueirense	27	(2)
2018	→ Hercílio Luz (loan)	12	(1)
2020–2022	Caxias	54	(4)
2023	Ypiranga-RS	12	(1)
2023–	Vitória	119	(15)
- * Club domestic league appearances and goals as of 8 April 2026

Matheus Martins Fogaça de Paula (born 18 October 1997), commonly known as Matheuzinho or Matheusinho, is a Brazilian footballer who plays as either an attacking midfielder or a forward for Vitória.

== Career ==
Matheuzinho was born in Capivari de Baixo, Santa Catarina, and represented Figueirense as a youth. He made his first team debut on 4 March 2015, coming on as a late substitute for Rafael Bastos in a 2–1 Campeonato Catarinense home win over Metropolitano.

Matheuzinho scored his first senior goal on 15 March 2015, netting Figueira's fourth in a 4–0 away routing of the same opponent. After being mainly used in the under-20 sides, he made his Série A debut on 3 July 2016, replacing Jocinei in a 1–1 home draw against Atlético Mineiro.

Matheuzinho was loaned to Hercílio Luz for the 2018 Catarinense, but only featured for the under-23 team of Figueirense after returning. He again featured rarely before signing for Caxias on 18 September 2020.

On 20 October 2022, Matheuzinho signed for Ypiranga-RS for the upcoming season. The following 7 April, he moved to Vitória as the club paid his release clause, and was regularly used as the club achieved promotion from the Série B as champions.

== Career statistics ==
As of 17 February 2024

Club	Season	League			State League		Cup		Continental		Other		Total	
Club	Season	Division	Apps	Goals	Apps	Goals	Apps	Goals	Apps	Goals	Apps	Goals	Apps	Goals
Figueirense	2015	Série A	0	0	4	1	1	0	—		—		5	1
Figueirense	2016	Série A	5	0	0	0	0	0	—		—		5	0
Figueirense	2017	Série B	0	0	0	0	1	0	—		1 (Note: Appearance(s) in Primeira Liga)	0	2	0
Figueirense	2018	Série B	0	0	—		—		—		—		0	0
Figueirense	2019	Série B	4	0	9	1	2	0	—		—		15	1
Figueirense	Total		9	0	13	2	4	0	—		1	0	27	2
Hercílio Luz (loan)	2018	Catarinense	—		12	1	—		—		—		12	1
Caxias	2020	Série D	11	0	—		—		—		—		11	0
Caxias	2021	Série D	9	0	6	0	0	0	—		—		15	0
Caxias	2022	Série D	17	3	11	1	—		—		—		28	4
Caxias	Total		37	3	17	1	0	0	—		—		54	4
Ypiranga-RS	2023	Série C	0	0	12	1	2	0	—		—		14	1
Vitória	2023	Série B	27	2	—		—		—		—		27	2
Vitória	2024	Série A	0	0	5	0	0	0	—		2 (Note: Appearance(s) in Copa do Nordeste)	0	7	0
Vitória	Total		27	2	5	0	0	0	—		2	0	34	2
Career total			73	5	59	5	6	0	0	0	3	0	141	10

== Honours ==
Figueirense

- Campeonato Catarinense: 2015

Vitória

- Campeonato Brasileiro Série B: 2023
