= Itabuna Esporte Clube =

Brazilian football team

Itabuna
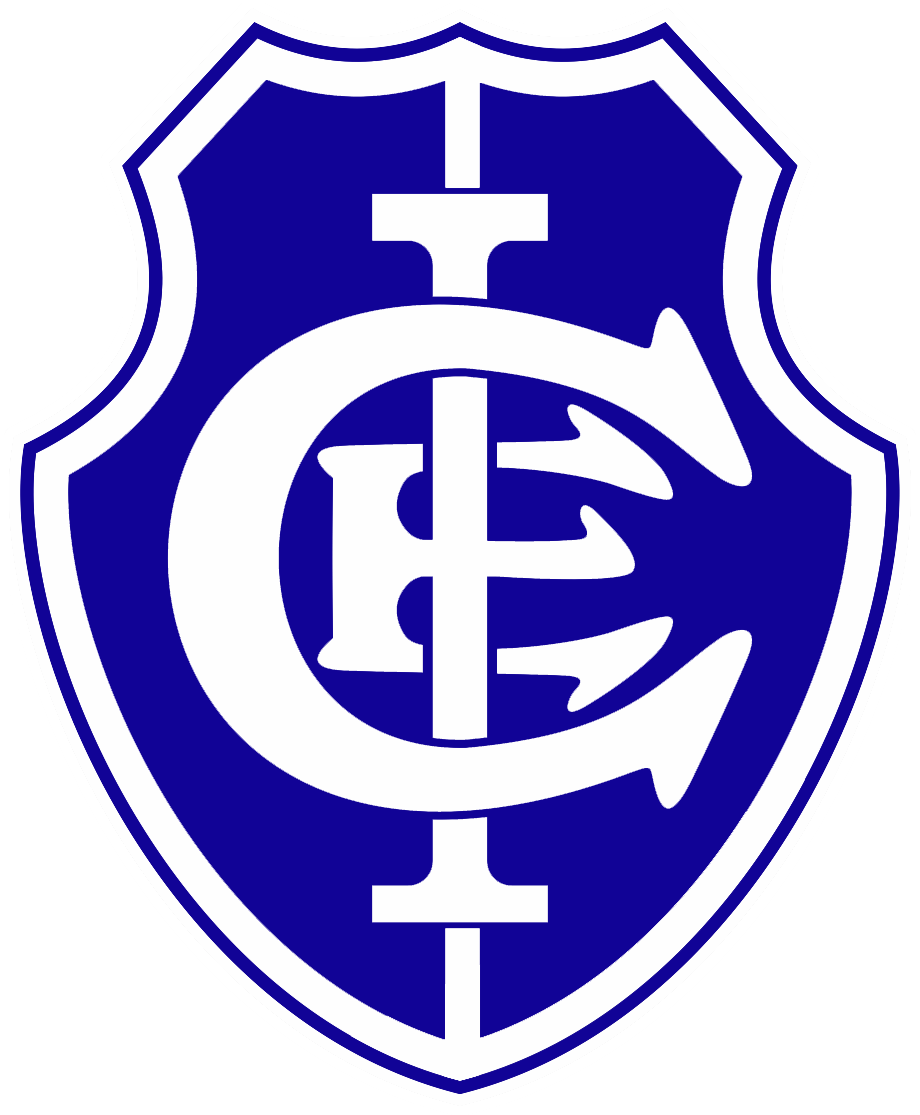
- Full name: Itabuna Esporte Clube
- Nickname: Dragão do Sul
- Founded: 23 May 1967; 58 years ago
- Ground: Estádio Luiz Viana Filho, Itabuna, Bahia state, Brazil
- Capacity: 11,745
- President: Ricardo Xavier
- Head Coach: Hugo Aparecido
- League: Campeonato Baiano Segunda Divisão
- 2025: Baiano Segunda Divisão, 3rd of 10
Home colours	Away colours

Itabuna Esporte Clube, commonly known as Itabuna, is a Brazilian football team based in Itabuna, Bahia state. They competed in the Série A twice.

== History ==
The club was founded on 23 May 1967. Itabuna competed in the Série A in 1978, when they reached the Second Stage of the competition, and in 1979, when they were eliminated in the First Stage of the competition. They won the Campeonato Baiano Second Level in 2002 and 2022.

== Honours ==
- Campeonato Baiano
  - Runners-up (1): 1970
- Campeonato Baiano Second Division
  - Winners (2): 2002, 2022

== Stadium ==
Itabuna Esporte Clube play their home games at Estádio Luiz Viana Filho, nicknamed Itabunão. The stadium has a maximum capacity of 11,745 people.
