= Esporte Clube Vitória =

Brazilian association football club based in Salvador, Bahia

Vitória
- Full name: Esporte Clube Vitória
- Nicknames: Leão da Barra (Barra's Lion); Nêgo; Rubro-negro (Red and Black); Colossal
- Founded: 13 May 1899; 127 years ago
- Ground: Barradão
- Capacity: 35,618
- President: Fábio Rios Mota
- Manager: Rafael Lacerda
- League: Campeonato Brasileiro Série A Campeonato Baiano
- 2025 2025: Série A, 15th of 20; Baiano, 2nd of 10
- Website: ecvitoria.com.br
Home colors	Away colors

Esporte Clube Vitória (Brazilian Portuguese: [isˈpɔʁtʃi ˈklubi viˈtɔɾi.ɐ]) is a Brazilian professional club based in Salvador, Bahia founded on 13 May 1899. It competes in the Campeonato Brasileiro Série A, the top flight of Brazilian football, as well as in the Campeonato Baiano, the top flight of the Bahia state football league.

Vitória's home games are played at the club's own stadium, Manoel Barradas, which has a capacity of 35,632. The team plays in red and black horizontal striped shirts, black shorts and black socks. The stripes have changed over time: they have been sometimes vertical, horizontal, wide and narrow.

The youth system of the club is one of the most successful of the world, holding, between 1995 and 2000, at its peak, at least 21 international titles.

Notable players who started their careers at the club include Bebeto, Vampeta, Dida, Júnior, Hulk, David Luiz, Dudu Cearense, Marcelo Moreno, Gabriel Paulista and others.

Vitória's main rivals are Esporte Clube Bahia. Their matches are known as Ba–Vi ("Ba" from Esporte Clube Bahia and "Vi" from Esporte Clube Vitória). It is one of the most intense rivalries, consistently ranked among the world's most bitter.

== History ==
The club was founded on 13 May 1899, by the brothers Artur and Artêmio Valente, along with seventeen other young fellows. They were from an old Bahia family, and discovered football during their studies in the United Kingdom. Initially Vitória was a cricket club, named Club de Cricket Victoria, because all of them lived at the Vitória neighborhood, in Salvador.

On 22 May 1901, Vitória played its first football match, at Campo da Pólvora, against International Sport Club, a team whose players were English seamen. Vitória beat International 3–2. Two months after that match, Vitória changed its original colors, which were black and white, to red and black, which are still in use.

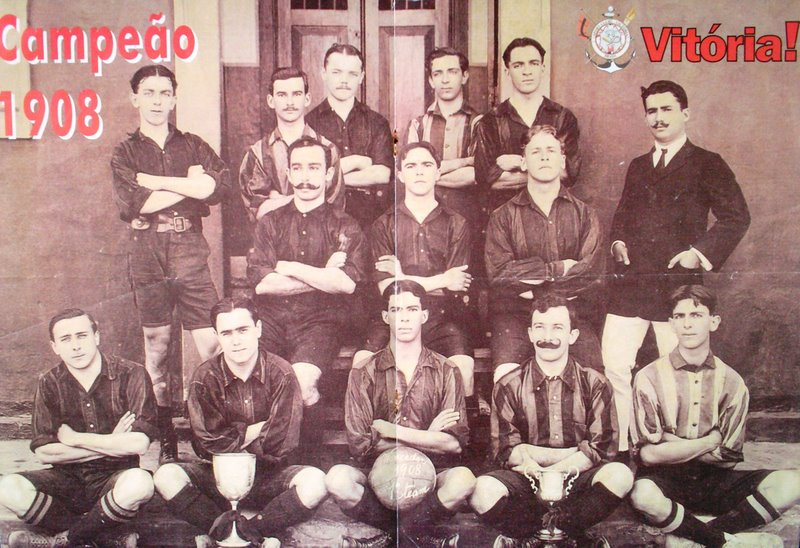
1908 Bahia State Champions – Milzen, Álvaro Tarquinio e Mario Pereira; A. C. Martins, Adriano Porto e Noé Nunes; Armando Gordilho, Oscar Alves, Fernando Alves, C. Muller, R. Mc. Nair, Oscar Luz, A. Galeão e Alfredo Seixas.

On 13 September 1903, Vitória beat a club formed by people from São Paulo state, São Paulo Bahia Football Club 2–0 in the club's first official match. In 1908, Vitória won its first title ever, the Campeonato Baiano. They won the next year as well.

From 1910 to 1952, they didn't win any titles because they were still an amateur club. In 1953, the club turned professional, and won its third Baiano honor. Bahia was dominating the state championship, and Vitória only won titles in 1955, 1957, 1964, 1965, 1972, 1980, 1985 and 1989.

The club was runner-up in the 1993 Campeonato Brasileiro Série A to Palmeiras, with an extremely small payroll. Vitória was champion of Bahia in 1990, 1992, 1995, 1996, 1997, 1999 and 2000, becoming the top club of the state for the first time. In the 1999 Campeonato Brasileiro Série A, Vitória reached the semi-finals.

In the 2000s, the Campeonato Baiano trophy was won by Vitória eight out of ten years.

In 2004 Vitória, after a poor campaign, was relegated to the Brazilian Second Division. In 2005, the club competed in the Brazilian second division, finishing 17th, and so was relegated to the Third Division for the first time in its history.

In 2006, Vitória was runner-up of the third division, and was promoted to the second division. In 2007, the club was promoted back to the first division after finishing in fourth place. This meant the club had managed to return from the third to the first division in only two years. The team was also relegated in 2010, promoted back in 2012, relegated again in 2014, but this time they were promoted back after one season in 2015.

In February 2018 the intense rivalry between Vitória and Esporte Clube Bahia drew international attention when nine players (four from Bahia and five from Vitória) were shown the red card in a State Championship match. The team was relegated back to the second division of the Brazilian league later that year.

In 2021, Vitória was relegated to the third division for a second time. However this was followed by back to back promotions, in 2022 to the second tier and as champions of the second division in 2023, the first national title of the club.

== Mascot ==
The club's mascot is a lion named Lelê Leão (Lion), and according to Vitória's official site, his objective is to stimulate the club's supporters and players on match days.

In 2017 the mascot was updated to a new version with dreadlocks. The braids reference the Afro-Brazilian roots of the city of Salvador, and the fact that the team has the highest percentage of black fans in the country.

== Competitions record ==
This is the competition record of Vitória's last few seasons:

Champion.
Runner-up.
Classified for Sudamericana.
Promoted.
Relegated.

Year	Campeonato Baiano					Campeonato Brasileiro							Copa do Brasil					Copa do Nordeste					Copa Sudamericana
Year	Pos	Pld	W	D	L	Division	Pos	Pts	Pld	W	D	L	Pos	Pld	W	D	L	Pos	Pld	W	D	L	Pos	Pld	W	D	L
2020	5th	13	3	4	2	Série B	14th	48	38	11	15	12	27th	4	1	1	2	9th	8	4	2	2	-	-	-	-	-
2021	5th	9	2	5	2	Série B	18th	40	38	8	16	14	14th	6	3	0	3	4th	9	4	4	1	-	-	-	-	-
2022	5th	9	3	4	2	Série C	4th	59	25	10	8	7	52th+	3	1	1	1	-	-	-	-	-	-	-	-	-	-
2023	6th	12	3	3	3	Série B	1st	72	38	22	6	10	52º+	1	0	0	1	14th	8	1	3	4	-	-	-	-	-
2024	1st	13	9	2	2	Série A	11th	47	38	13	8	17	31st	2	0	0	2	9th	8	4	2	2	-	-	-	-	-
2025	2nd	13	8	4	1	Série A	15th	45	38	11	12	15	second-stage					quarter-finals					group stage
2026	2nd	11	4	5	2	Série A												1st	10	8	1	1	-	-	-	-	-

== Colours ==
Its colours are red and black, which made it to be called "Rubro-Negro" ("red-black", in portuguese). In the early years, the club's colours would be green and yellow, but due to difficulty in find the proper materials in these colours, it was chosen to be white and black. That was the colours worn in the inaugural match facing the International Sport Club. The current red-black colours were adopted 3 years later, in 1902.

Many kinds of shirts have been worn by Vitória's players over the years.

1993	1997	2000	2003	2007	2008	2009	2012	2022	2023

=== 2023 kit ===
home	away	alternative

=== 2024 kit ===
home	away	third	Nordeste

=== 2025 kit ===
home	away	third	Nordeste

=== 2026 kit ===
In 2026, Volt Sport only released the home kit and a World Cup commemorative kit. The day after the Northeast title, the club's president declared they would rescind the contract with Volt

home

== Current squad ==
As of 22 September 2026

Note: Flags indicate national team as defined under FIFA eligibility rules; some limited exceptions apply. Players may hold more than one non-FIFA nationality.

No.	Pos.	Nation	Player
1	GK	BRA	Lucas Arcanjo (vice-captain)
2	DF	ARG	Emanuel Brítez
3	DF	BRA	Darlan (on loan from Grêmio Anápolis)
4	DF	BRA	Camutanga
6	MF	ARG	Emmanuel Martínez
7	FW	BRA	Marinho
8	MF	ARG	Tomás Pochettino (on loan from Fortaleza)
9	FW	BRA	Alex Bruno (on loan from ASA)
10	MF	BRA	Matheuzinho
11	FW	BRA	Osvaldo
12	FW	ARG	Diego Tarzia
13	DF	BRA	Ramon (on loan from Internacional)
15	MF	BRA	Walace (on loan from Cruzeiro)
16	MF	POR	Rúben Ismael
18	DF	BRA	Kauan Coutinho
20	FW	BRA	Lucas Silva (on loan from Seoul)
21	MF	BRA	Dudu
23	FW	BRA	Fabrí
25	DF	BRA	Cacá (on loan from Corinthians)

No.	Pos.	Nation	Player
26	DF	BRA	Edenilson
28	FW	BRA	Anderson Pato
33	FW	BRA	Erick
35	GK	BRA	Fintelman
36	DF	BRA	Luan Cândido (on loan from Red Bull Bragantino)
41	MF	BRA	Wendell Santos
43	DF	BRA	Edu Ribeiro
44	MF	BRA	Gabriel Baralhas (captain)
45	DF	BRA	Nathan Mendes (on loan from Red Bull Bragantino)
70	DF	BRA	Fabiano (on loan from Moreirense)
71	GK	BRA	Yuri Sena
77	FW	URU	Ignacio Laquintana (on loan from Red Bull Bragantino)
79	FW	BRA	Renato Kayzer
83	DF	BRA	Jamerson (on loan from Coritiba)
88	MF	BRA	Zé Vitor (on loan from Maringá)
91	FW	BRA	Renê
95	MF	BRA	Caíque Gonçalves
98	DF	BRA	Mateus Silva

=== Youth team ===
Note: Flags indicate national team as defined under FIFA eligibility rules; some limited exceptions apply. Players may hold more than one non-FIFA nationality.

No.	Pos.	Nation	Player
42	GK	BRA	Davi Barbosa
46	MF	ARG	Alejandro Almaraz
48	DF	BRA	Ivan
49	FW	BRA	Marquinhos
53	DF	BRA	Andrei
58	FW	BRA	Emanoel

No.	Pos.	Nation	Player
59	DF	BRA	Gean
65	MF	COL	Nicolás Celis
67	DF	BRA	Guilherme Inácio
69	DF	BRA	Wanderson
70	MF	BRA	Cauan Farias

=== Other players under contract ===
Note: Flags indicate national team as defined under FIFA eligibility rules; some limited exceptions apply. Players may hold more than one non-FIFA nationality.

No.	Pos.	Nation	Player
—	DF	BRA	Zé Marcos

=== Out on loan ===
Note: Flags indicate national team as defined under FIFA eligibility rules; some limited exceptions apply. Players may hold more than one non-FIFA nationality.

No.	Pos.	Nation	Player
—	DF	BRA	Claudinho (at Sport Recife until 30 November 2026)
—	DF	BRA	Paulo Roberto (at Cianorte until 30 September 2026)
—	DF	BRA	Willean Lepo (at Criciúma until 30 November 2026)
—	MF	BRA	Dudu Miraíma (at São Bernardo until 30 November 2026)
—	MF	BRA	Filipe Machado (at Goiás until 30 November 2026)
—	MF	BRA	Léo Naldi (at Novorizontino until 30 November 2026)
—	MF	BRA	Luis Aucélio (at Londrina until 30 November 2026)
—	MF	BRA	Lucas Lohan (at Audax Rio until 30 November 2026)

No.	Pos.	Nation	Player
—	MF	BRA	Pablo Baianinho (at Paysandu until 30 November 2026)
—	MF	BRA	Pepê (at Cuiabá until 30 November 2026)
—	MF	BRA	Ronald (at Criciúma until 30 November 2026)
—	MF	BRA	Zé Breno (at Torreense until 30 June 2027)
—	FW	BRA	Lawan (at Botafogo-PB until 30 November 2026)
—	FW	BRA	Luis Miguel (at Caxias until 30 November 2026)
—	FW	BRA	Ruan Gabriel (at Göztepe until 30 June 2027)
—	FW	BRA	Wellington Rato (at Goiás until 30 November 2026)

== Honours ==
=== Official tournaments ===
National
Competitions	Titles	Seasons
Campeonato Brasileiro Série B	1	2023
Regional
Competitions	Titles	Seasons
Copa do Nordeste	5^{s}	1997, 1999, 2003, 2010, 2026
State
Competitions	Titles	Seasons
Campeonato Baiano	30	1908, 1909, 1953, 1955, 1957, 1964, 1965, 1972, 1980, 1985, 1989, 1990, 1992, 1995, 1996, 1997, 1999, 2000, 2002, 2003, 2004, 2005, 2007, 2008, 2009, 2010, 2013, 2016, 2017, 2024
Taça Estado da Bahia	3^{s}	2004, 2005, 2006

- record
- ^{s} shared record

=== Others tournaments ===
==== International ====
- International Soccer League (1): 1900
- Dakar Tournament (1): 1992
- Trofeo Ciudad de Valladolid (1): 1997

==== National ====
- Torneio Quadrangular de Salvador (2): 1954-Ii, 1967-II
- Torneio Maria Quitéria (1): 1996

==== Regional ====
- Torneio José Américo de Almeida Filho (1): 1976

==== State ====
- Torneio Início da Bahia (11): 1926, 1941, 1942, 1943, 1944, 1949, 1953, 1955, 1958, 1961, 1980

=== Runners-up ===
- Campeonato Brasileiro Série A (1): 1993
- Copa do Brasil (1): 2010
- Campeonato Brasileiro Série B (1): 1992
- Campeonato Brasileiro Série C (1): 2006
- Copa do Nordeste (3): 1998, 2000, 2002
- Campeonato Baiano (30): 1906, 1907, 1911, 1912, 1942, 1947, 1950, 1951, 1958, 1959, 1962, 1966, 1971, 1974, 1975, 1976, 1977, 1979, 1981, 1988, 1993, 1994, 1998, 2006, 2011, 2012, 2014, 2018, 2025, 2026
- Taça Estado da Bahia (2): 2001, 2002

=== Youth team ===
- Copa do Brasil Sub-20 (1): 2012
- Taça Belo Horizonte de Juniores (1): 1994
- Copa Votorantim Sub-15 (1): 2000

=== Women's Football ===
- Campeonato Baiano de Futebol Feminino (2): 2016–17, 2018

== See also ==
- Esporte Clube Vitória (basketball)
