= 2023 Campeonato Baiano =

Campeonato Baiano
- Season: 2023
- Dates: 10 January – 2 April
- Champions: Bahia (50th title)
- Relegated: Doce Mel; Jacobinense
- Copa do Brasil: Bahia; Itabuna; Jacuipense
- Série D: Itabuna; Jacuipense
- Copa do Nordeste: Bahia
- Matches: 51
- Goals: 113 (2.22 per match)
- Top goalscorer: Cesinha (6 goals)

The 2023 Campeonato Baiano (officially the Campeonato Baiano de Futebol Profissional Série “A” – Edição 2023) was the 119th edition of Bahia's top professional football league organized by FBF. The competition began on 10 January and ended on 2 April 2023. Atlético de Alagoinhas were the defending champions but they were eliminated in the group stage.

Bahia defeated Jacuipense 4–1 on aggregate obtaining their 50th title. As champions, Bahia qualified for the 2024 Copa do Brasil and the 2024 Copa do Nordeste.

== Format ==
In the first stage, each team played the other nine teams in a single round-robin tournament. Top four teams advanced to the semi-finals. The bottom two teams were relegated to the 2024 Campeonato Baiano Série B.

The final stage was played on a home-and-away two-legged basis with the best overall performance team hosting the second leg. If tied on aggregate, the penalty shoot-out would be used to determine the winners.

Champions qualified for the 2024 Copa do Brasil and 2024 Copa do Nordeste, while runners-up and third place qualified for the 2024 Copa do Brasil. Top two teams not already qualified for 2024 Série A, Série B or Série C qualified for 2024 Campeonato Brasileiro Série D. The champions of the 2023 Copa Governador will earn the third Série D berth.

== Teams ==
Club	Home City	Manager	2022 Result
Alagoinhas Atlético Clube (Atlético de Alagoinhas)	Alagoinhas	Rodrigo Chagas	1st
Esporte Clube Bahia	Salvador	Renato Paiva	6th
Associação Desportiva Bahia de Feira	Feira de Santana	João Carlos Ângelo	3rd
Barcelona Futebol Clube (Barcelona de Ilhéus)	Ilhéus	Gelson Conte	4th
Doce Mel Esporte Clube	Ipiaú	Eduardo Bahia	8th
Itabuna Esporte Clube	Itabuna	Sérgio Araújo	1st (Second Division)
Jacobinense Esporte Clube	Jacobina	Agnaldo Liz	2nd (Second Division)
Esporte Clube Jacuipense	Riachão do Jacuípe	Jonilson Veloso	2nd
Sociedade Desportiva Juazeirense	Juazeiro	Carlos Rabello	7th
Esporte Clube Vitória	Salvador	Léo Condé	5th

== First stage ==
=== Group 1 ===
Pos	Team	Pld	W	D	L	GF	GA	GD	Pts	Qualification or relegation
1	Bahia	9	7	0	2	12	9	+3	21	Advance to Semi-finals
2	Jacuipense	9	5	2	2	13	9	+4	17	Advance to Semi-finals
3	Juazeirense	9	5	1	3	12	8	+4	16	Advance to Semi-finals
4	Itabuna	9	4	3	2	13	9	+4	15	Advance to Semi-finals
5	Bahia de Feira	9	3	4	2	13	10	+3	13	
6	Vitória	9	3	3	3	11	11	0	12	
7	Barcelona de Ilhéus	9	2	4	3	8	8	0	10	
8	Atlético de Alagoinhas	9	2	3	4	8	8	0	9	
9	Jacobinense (R)	9	2	1	6	5	13	−8	7	Relegation to 2024 Campeonato Baiano Série B
10	Doce Mel (R)	9	0	3	6	3	13	−10	3	Relegation to 2024 Campeonato Baiano Série B

Source: FBF
Rules for classification: 1) Points; 2) Wins; 3) Goal difference; 4) Goals scored; 5) Head-to-head result; 6) Fewest red cards; 7) Fewest yellow cards; 8) Draw.
(R) Relegated

== Final stage ==
=== Bracket ===
Semi-finals
3	Juazeirense	0	0	0
2	Jacuipense	1	3	4
4	Itabuna	1	1	2
1	Bahia	0	4	4

Finals
Jacuipense	1	0	1
Bahia	1	3	4

=== Semi-finals ===
Team 1	Agg.	Team 2	1st leg	2nd leg
Itabuna	2–4	Bahia	1–0	1–4
Juazeirense	0–4	Jacuipense	0–1	0–3

==== Group 2 ====
11 March 2023
16:00

Itabuna	1–0	Bahia
Jan Pieter 73'	Report

Estádio Antônio Elias Ribeiro, Camacan
Referee: Diego Pombo Lopez

18 March 2023
16:00

Bahia	4–1	Itabuna
Everaldo 13' (pen.), 54'; Cauly 51', 85'	Report	Cesinha 76' (pen.)

Arena Fonte Nova, Salvador
Referee: Bruno Pereira Vasconcelos

Bahia qualified for the finals.

==== Group 3 ====
12 March 2023
16:00

Juazeirense	0–1	Jacuipense
	Report	Robinho 90'

Estádio Adauto Moraes, Juazeiro
Referee: Marielson Alves Silva

19 March 2023
16:00

Jacuipense	3–0	Juazeirense
Thiaguinho 24'; Welder 82'; Raphinha 90+2'	Report

Estádio Eliel Martins, Riachão do Jacuípe
Referee: Diego Pombo Lopez

Jacuipense qualified for the finals.

=== Finals ===
Team 1	Agg.	Team 2	1st leg	2nd leg
Jacuipense	1–4	Bahia	1–1	0–3

==== Group 4 ====
26 March 2023
16:00

Jacuipense	1–1	Bahia
Welder 28'	Report	Everaldo 54'

Estádio Eliel Martins, Riachão do Jacuípe
Attendance: 3,435
Referee: Marielson Alves Silva

Jacuipense	Bahia

GK	12	(Brazil) Jean
RB	2	(Brazil) Raphinha
CB	25	(Brazil) Kanu (c)
CB	4	(Brazil) Weverton
LB	6	(Brazil) Radar		(substituted off) 75'
DM	5	(Brazil) Fábio Bahia
DM	15	(Brazil) Amaral	(yellow card) 57'	(substituted off) 67'
AM	16	(Brazil) Eudair		(substituted off) 46'
AM	17	(Brazil) Thiaguinho		(substituted off) 75'
FW	10	(Brazil) Welder		(substituted off) 90+1'
FW	9	(Brazil) Jeam
Substitutes:
GK	1	(Brazil) Marcelo
DF	3	(Brazil) Vítor Salvador
DF	18	(Brazil) Caíque Sá
DF	21	(Brazil) Matheus Castelo
MF	7	(Brazil) Paulo Miranda
MF	8	(Brazil) Flávio		(substituted on) 46'
MF	13	(Brazil) Jadiel	(yellow card) 26'
MF	14	(Brazil) Eric		(substituted on) 75'
MF	20	(Brazil) Fábio Matos		(substituted on) 67'
FW	11	(Brazil) William		(substituted on) 90+1'
FW	19	(Brazil) Robinho		(substituted on) 75'
FW	22	(Brazil) Popó
Coach:
(Brazil) Jonilson Veloso

GK	22	(Brazil) Marcos Felipe
CB	3	(Brazil) Gabriel Xavier
CB	4	(Brazil) Kanu (c)
CB	44	(Brazil) Marcos Victor
RWB	29	(Brazil) Vítor Jacaré
DM	26	(Uruguay) Nicolás Acevedo		(substituted off) 82'
DM	5	(Brazil) Rezende		(substituted off) 88'
LWB	79	(Brazil) Matheus Bahia	(yellow card) 86'	(substituted off) 88'
AM	8	(Brazil) Cauly
FW	9	(Brazil) Everaldo		(substituted off) 82'
FW	11	(Brazil) Biel		(substituted off) 75'
Substitutes:
GK	77	(Brazil) Mateus Claus
DF	6	(Ecuador) Jhoanner Chávez		(substituted on) 88'
DF	13	(Brazil) André	(yellow card) 55'
DF	33	(Brazil) David Duarte
DF	40	(Bulgaria) Cicinho
DF	66	(Brazil) Ryan
MF	17	(Brazil) Diego Rosa		(substituted on) 88'
MF	19	(Argentina) Lucas Mugni		(substituted on) 82'
MF	23	(Brazil) Patrick Verhon
MF	42	(Brazil) Miquéias
FW	16	(China) Ricardo Goulart		(substituted on) 82'
FW	37	(Brazil) Kayky		(substituted on) 75'
Coach:
(Portugal) Renato Paiva

Assistant referees:
Alessandro Alvaro Rocha de Matos
Elicarlos Franco de Oliveira
Fourth official:
Ricarle Gustavo Gonçalves Batista
Fifth official:
Jucimar dos Santos Dias
Video assistant referee:
Rodrigo Nunes de Sá (Rio de Janeiro)
Assistant video assistant referees:
Emerson Ricardo de Almeida Andrade
Paulo de Tarso Bregalda Gussen

2 April 2023
16:00

Bahia	3–0	Jacuipense
Everaldo 66'; Cauly 68'; Vítor Jacaré 90+5' (pen.)	Report

Arena Fonte Nova, Salvador
Attendance: 48,085
Referee: Diego Pombo Lopez

Bahia	Jacuipense

GK	22	(Brazil) Marcos Felipe		(substituted off) 87'
CB	44	(Brazil) Marcos Victor		(substituted off) 46'
CB	4	(Brazil) Kanu
CB	5	(Brazil) Rezende
RWB	29	(Brazil) Vítor Jacaré	(yellow card) 42'
DM	26	(Uruguay) Nicolás Acevedo
DM	10	(Brazil) Daniel (c)		(substituted off) 79'
LWB	6	(Ecuador) Jhoanner Chávez		(substituted off) 79'
AM	8	(Brazil) Cauly
FW	9	(Brazil) Everaldo		(substituted off) 81'
FW	11	(Brazil) Biel
Substitutes:
GK	77	(Brazil) Mateus Claus		(substituted on) 87'
DF	3	(Brazil) Gabriel Xavier		(substituted on) 46'
DF	33	(Brazil) David Duarte
DF	40	(Bulgaria) Cicinho
DF	66	(Brazil) Ryan
DF	79	(Brazil) Matheus Bahia		(substituted on) 79'
MF	17	(Brazil) Diego Rosa
MF	19	(Argentina) Lucas Mugni		(substituted on) 79'
MF	23	(Brazil) Patrick Verhon
FW	16	(China) Ricardo Goulart		(substituted on) 81'
FW	18	(Brazil) Everton Moraes
FW	37	(Brazil) Kayky
Coach:
(Portugal) Renato Paiva

GK	12	(Brazil) Jean
RB	2	(Brazil) Raphinha
CB	25	(Brazil) Kanu (c)
CB	4	(Brazil) Weverton
LB	6	(Brazil) Radar		(substituted off) 46'
DM	5	(Brazil) Fábio Bahia
DM	15	(Brazil) Amaral	(yellow card) 5'	(substituted off) 63'
AM	16	(Brazil) Eudair		(substituted off) 72'
AM	17	(Brazil) Thiaguinho		(substituted off) 81'
FW	10	(Brazil) Welder	(yellow card) 53'	(substituted off) 81'
FW	9	(Brazil) Jeam
Substitutes:
GK	1	(Brazil) Marcelo
DF	3	(Brazil) Vítor Salvador
DF	18	(Brazil) Caíque Sá
DF	21	(Brazil) Matheus Castelo
MF	7	(Brazil) Paulo Miranda
MF	8	(Brazil) Flávio		(substituted on) 63'
MF	13	(Brazil) Jadiel
MF	14	(Brazil) Eric	(yellow card) 79'	(substituted on) 46'
MF	20	(Brazil) Fábio Matos		(substituted on) 72'
FW	11	(Brazil) William		(substituted on) 81'
FW	19	(Brazil) Robinho		(substituted on) 81'
FW	22	(Brazil) Popó
Coach:
(Brazil) Jonilson Veloso

Assistant referees:
Luanderson Lima dos Santos
Paulo de Tarso Bregalda Gussen
Fourth official:
Eziquiel Souza Costa
Fifth official:
Daniella Coutinho Pinto
Video assistant referee:
Rodrigo Nunes de Sá (Rio de Janeiro)
Assistant video assistant referees:
Emerson Ricardo de Almeida Andrade
Edevan de Oliveira Pereira
