= 2024 Ceará Sporting Club season =

Ceará Sporting Club
2024 season
- Manager: Vagner Mancini (until 26 June); Anderson Batatais (caretaker)
- Stadium: Castelão
- Série B: 4th (promoted)
- Campeonato Cearense: Winners
- Copa do Brasil: Third round
- Copa do Nordeste: Quarter-finals
- Top goalscorer: League: Facundo Barceló (4); All: Facundo Barceló (6)
- Average home league attendance: 28,120

The 2024 Ceará Sporting Club season was the club's 110th season in existence and the second consecutive season in the second division of Brazilian football. In addition to the domestic league, Ceará participated in this season's editions of the Campeonato Cearense and the Copa do Brasil.

== Transfers ==
=== In ===
Pos.	Player	Transferred from	Fee	Date	Source
DF	(Brazil) Ramon	(Brazil) Atlético Goianiense	Loan	1 January 2024	
MF	(Argentina) Lucas Mugni	(Brazil) Bahia	Free	11 January 2024	
FW	(Uruguay) Facundo Barceló	(Paraguay) Guaraní	Free	11 January 2024	
FW	(Brazil) Zé Roberto	(Brazil) Sport	Loan return	6 March 2024	
MF	(Brazil) Geovane	(Brazil) Santo André	Loan return	4 April 2024	
GK	(Brazil) Maycon Cleiton	(Brazil) Red Bull Bragantino	Loan	19 April 2024	
MF	(Brazil) Patrick de Lucca	(Brazil) Vasco da Gama	Loan	19 April 2024	

=== Out ===
Pos.	Player	Transferred to	Fee	Date	Source
FW	(Brazil) Zé Roberto	(Brazil) Sport	Loan	10 January 2024	
MF	(Brazil) Geovane	(Brazil) Santo André	Loan	17 January 2024	
MF	(Brazil) Chrystian Barletta	(Brazil) Sport	Undisclosed	21 February 2024	
FW	(Brazil) Zé Roberto	(Brazil) Sport	Free	7 March 2024	
DF	(Brazil) Lucas Ribeiro	(Brazil) Goiás	Undisclosed	10 April 2024	
MF	(Brazil) Geovane	(Brazil) Vila Nova	Loan	18 April 2024	
DF	(Brazil) Jonathan Jesus	(Brazil) Cruzeiro	Undisclosed	14 June 2024	

== Pre-season and friendlies ==
Win Draw Loss

== Competitions ==
=== Overall record ===
Competition	First match	Last match	Starting round	Final position	Record							
Competition	First match	Last match	Starting round	Final position	Pld	W	D	L	GF	GA	GD	Win %
Série B	20 April 2024	26 November 2024	Matchday 1		12	4	4	4	16	15	+1	33.33
Campeonato Cearense	17 February 2024	6 April 2024	First phase	Winners	5	3	2	0	16	4	+12	60.00
Copa do Brasil	3 May 2024	24 May 2024	Third round	Third round	2	0	0	2	0	2	−2	0.00
Copa do Nordeste	4 February 2024	11 April 2024	Group stage	Quarter-finals	9	4	3	2	10	7	+3	44.44
Total					28	11	9	8	42	28	+14	39.29

Last updated: 26 June 2024
Source: Soccerway

=== Campeonato Brasileiro Série B ===
==== League table ====
Pos	Team	Pld	W	D	L	GF	GA	GD	Pts	Promotion or relegation
2	Mirassol (P)	38	19	10	9	42	26	+16	67	Promotion to 2025 Campeonato Brasileiro Série A
3	Sport (P)	38	19	9	10	57	37	+20	66	Promotion to 2025 Campeonato Brasileiro Série A
4	Ceará (P)	38	19	7	12	59	41	+18	64	Promotion to 2025 Campeonato Brasileiro Série A
5	Novorizontino	38	18	10	10	43	31	+12	64	
6	Goiás	38	18	9	11	56	32	+24	63	

Source: CBF
Rules for classification: 1) points; 2) wins; 3) goal difference; 4) goals scored; 5) head-to-head results (only between 2 teams); 6) fewest red cards; 7) fewest yellow cards; 8) drawing of lots.
(P) Promoted

==== Results summary ====
Overall								Home						Away					
Pld	W	D	L	GF	GA	GD	Pts	W	D	L	GF	GA	GD	W	D	L	GF	GA	GD
38	19	7	12	59	41	+18	64	14	3	2	34	14	+20	5	4	10	25	27	−2

Last updated: 24 November 2024.
Source: soccerway

==== Results by round ====
Round	1	2	3	4	5	6	7	8	9	10	11	12	13	14	15	16	17	18	19	20	21	22	23	24	25	26	27	28	29	30	31	32	33	34	35	36	37	38
Ground	H	A	H	A	H	A	H	H	A	A	H	A	H	H	A	A	H	A	H	A	H	A	H	A	H	A	A	H	H	A	H	A	A	H	H	A	H	A
Result	D	L	D	W	W	D	W	W	L	L	D	L	W	L	L	W	W	D	W	L	L	W	W	D	W	L	L	W	W	L	W	W	L	W	W	W	W	D
Position	10	13	14	10	6	8	6	4	7	9	10	12	9	11	14	12	9	9	8	9	10	9	6	7	5	7	9	7	6	7	6	5	6	5	5	4	4	4

Updated to match(es) played on 24 November 2024. Source: worldfootball
A = Away; H = Home; W = Win; D = Draw; L = Loss

==== Matches ====
20 April 2024	Ceará	1–1	Goiás	Fortaleza
				Stadium: Castelão

30 April 2024	Mirassol	3–2	Ceará	Mirassol
				Stadium: Estádio José Maria de Campos Maia

7 May 2024	Ceará	2–2	CRB	Fortaleza
				Stadium: Castelão

11 May 2024	Novorizontino	0–3	Ceará	Novo Horizonte
				Stadium: Estádio Doutor Jorge Ismael de Biasi

16 May 2024	Ceará	2–1	Amazonas	Fortaleza
				Stadium: Castelão

19 May 2024	Operário Ferroviário	0–0	Ceará

26 May 2024	Ceará	2–1	Chapecoense	Fortaleza
				Stadium: Castelão

1 June 2024	Ceará	1–0	Coritiba	Fortaleza
				Stadium: Castelão

11 June 2024	Vila Nova	3–2	Ceará

16 June 2024	Brusque	1–0	Ceará

21 June 2024	Ceará	0–0	Sport	Fortaleza
				Stadium: Castelão

26 June 2024 12	Ponte Preta	3–1	Ceará	Campinas
22:00 BRT	Castro 10'; Jeh 34'; Dodô 60' (pen.); Luiz Felipe Oliveira de Paula (yellow card) 66'; Mateus Silva (yellow card) 72'	Report	David Ricardo (yellow card) 13'; Matheus Felipe (yellow card) 15'; Kaique Barbosa 69'	Stadium: Estádio Moisés Lucarelli; Attendance: 3,538; Referee: (Brazil) André Skettino Policarpo Bento

29 June 2024 13	Ceará	4–2	Ituano	Fortaleza
22:00 BRT	Saulo Mineiro 21' 30' 72'; Lourenço 39'; Richard (yellow card) 63'; Jean (yellow card) 90'	Report	Vinícius Paiva 7'; Léo Oliveira (yellow card) 10'; Claudinho (yellow card) 58'; Bruno Alves (yellow card) 75'; Kauan Richard 78'	Stadium: Castelão; Attendance: 7,981; Referee: (Brazil) Anderson Ribeiro Gonçalves

5 July 2024 14	Ceará	0–1	Santos FC	Fortaleza
	Lourenço (yellow card) 84'; Saulo Mineiro (yellow card) 90+17'	Report	Aderlan (yellow card) 15'; Otero 24'; Jair Cunha (yellow card) 45+1'; Pedrinho (yellow card) 45+4'; Sandry (yellow card) 55'; Rodrigo Ferreira (red card) 61'; Gabriel Brazão (yellow card) 88'	Stadium: Castelão; Attendance: 30,171; Referee: (Brazil) Emerson de Almeida Andrade

12 July 2024 15	Paysandu	2–1	Ceará	Belém
22:30 BRT	Nicolas 2'; Jean Dias (yellow card) 54'; Kevyn Lucas (yellow card) 61'; Val 86'; Carlão (yellow card) 90'	Report	Rafael Ramos 36'; Saulo Mineiro (yellow card) 40'; Eric (yellow card) 45+1'; Jean (yellow card) 76'; Recalde (red card) 90+7'	Stadium: Estádio da Curuzu; Attendance: 14,653; Referee: (Brazil) Paulo Belence Alves dos Prazeres Filho

19 July 2024 16	Avaí	0–1	Ceará	Florianópolis
	Judson (yellow card) 45+4'; Marcos Vinícius (yellow card) 62'; Vilar (yellow card) 81'	Report	David Ricardo 69'; Raí Ramos (yellow card) 83'; Lourenço (yellow card) 90+6'	Stadium: Estádio Aderbal Ramos da Silva; Attendance: 6,609; Referee: (Brazil) Wagner do Nascimento Magalhães

25 July 2024 17	Ceará	4–1	Botafogo-SP	Fortaleza
22:30 BRT	Erick Pulga 22'; Saulo Mineiro 24'; Aylon 32'; Mugni (yellow card) 35'; Rafael Ramos (yellow card) 52'; Lourenço 55'; Jean (yellow card) 74'	Report	Alexandre Jesus 43'; Lucas Vinicius Dias Costa (yellow card) 45+5'; Carlos Manuel (yellow card) 90+4'	Stadium: Castelão; Attendance: 18,262; Referee: (Brazil) Bruno Mota Correia

28 July 2024 18	América Mineiro	2–2	Ceará	Belo Horizonte
19:30 BRT	Felipe Amaral (yellow card) 4'; Alê 7' (yellow card) 63'; Juninho 18'	Report	Aylon 5'; David Ricardo (yellow card) 28'; Erick Pulga 44'	Stadium: Estádio Raimundo Sampaio; Attendance: 2,293; Referee: (Brazil) Denis da Silva Ribeiro Serafim

6 August 2024 19	Ceará	3–1	Guarani	Fortaleza
22:00 BRT	Erick Pulga 26' 90+2'; Saulo Mineiro (yellow card) 46'; Lourenço 79'; Matheus Felipe (yellow card) 86'; Jean (yellow card) 90+4'	Report	Caio Dantas 44' (pen.); Douglas (yellow card) 68'; Gabriel Bispo (yellow card) 77'; Jefferson (yellow card) 84'	Stadium: Castelão; Attendance: 30,946; Referee: (Brazil) Kleber Gonçalves

12 August 2024 20	Goiás	2–1	Ceará	Goiânia
22:00 BRT	Reynaldo (yellow card) 26'; Tadeu 34' (pen.) 90+11' (pen.); Luiz Henrique (yellow card) 54'; Thiago Rodrigues (yellow card) 90+9'	Report	Aylon 13' (yellow card) 28'; Patrick de Lucca (yellow card) 35'; David Ricardo (yellow card) 90+4'; Lourenço (yellow card) 90+9'; Paulo Victor (yellow card) 90+9'	Stadium: Estádio Hailé Pinheiro; Attendance: 4,071; Referee: (Brazil) Wagner do Nascimento Magalhães

=== Copa do Brasil ===
==== Third round ====
3 May 2024 First leg	v	Ceará

24 May 2024 Second leg	Ceará	v
