= Raniele =

Brazilian footballer (born 1996)

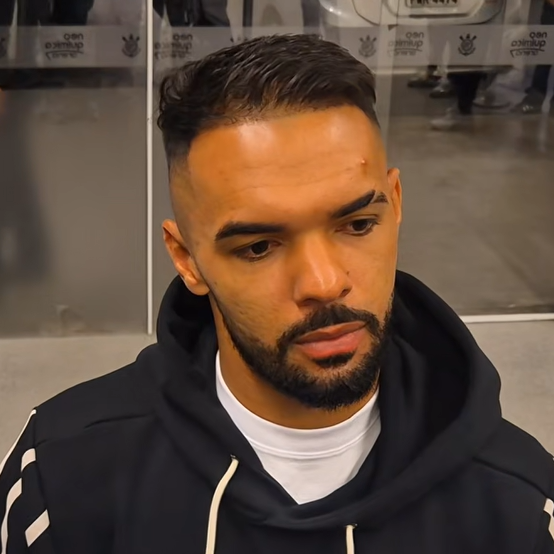
- Raniele in 2026

Personal information
- Full name: Raniele Almeida Melo
- Date of birth: 31 December 1996 (age 29)
- Place of birth: Baixa Grande, Brazil
- Height: 1.84 m (6 ft 0 in)
- Position: Defensive midfielder

Team information
- Current team: Corinthians
- Number: 14

Youth career
- Fernandópolis
- 2016: Ferroviária

Senior career*
Years	Team	Apps	(Gls)
2016–2020	Ferroviária	6	(1)
2018	→ Taubaté (loan)	15	(0)
2019	→ Penapolense (loan)	13	(1)
2020	→ Portuguesa (loan)	12	(0)
2020–2022	Jacuipense	17	(1)
2020–2021	→ Botafogo-SP (loan)	11	(0)
2021	→ Bahia (loan)	19	(0)
2022	→ Avaí (loan)	41	(2)
2023	Avaí	9	(0)
2023	Cuiabá	35	(3)
2024–	Corinthians	114	(3)
- * Club domestic league appearances and goals as of 18 November 2026 (UTC)

Raniele Almeida Melo (born 31 December 1996), simply known as Raniele, is a Brazilian footballer who plays for Corinthians. Mainly a defensive midfielder, he can also play as a central defender.

== Club career ==
=== Early career ===
Born in Baixa Grande, Bahia, Raniele played for Fernandópolis' under-20 squad before finishing his formation with Ferroviária. He made his senior debut with the latter on 10 July 2016, starting in a 0–0 Copa Paulista away draw against Rio Claro.

Raniele helped AFE to win the 2017 Copa Paulista, but was loaned to Taubaté on 4 December 2017. He again reached the finals of the Copa Paulista with Ferroviária in 2018, before moving to Penapolense on loan for the 2019 Campeonato Paulista Série A2.

Back at Ferroviária for the 2019 Série D, Raniele renewed his contract until 2022 with the club but moved to Portuguesa on loan on 25 November 2019. He was a starter at Lusa before moving to Jacuipense of the Série C on 16 July 2020.

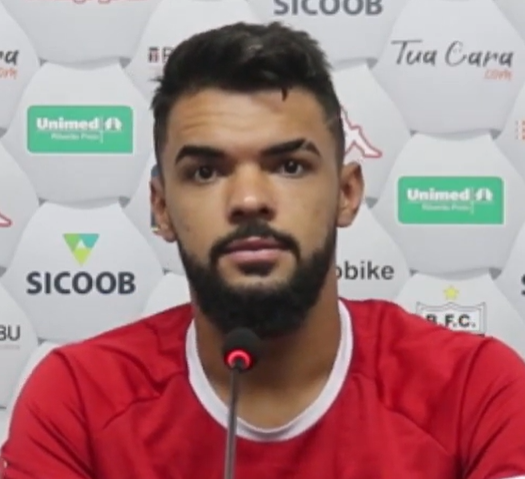
Raniele as a Botafogo-SP player in 2020

On 7 December 2020, while owned by Jacuipense, Raniele signed for Botafogo-SP for the remainder of the 2020 Série B. The following 10 February, he moved to Série A side Bahia, initially for the under-23 squad.

Raniele made his top tier debut on 25 July 2021, coming on as a late substitute for Jonas in a 3–0 away loss against Atlético Mineiro. He featured in another ten league matches during the year, as Bahia suffered relegation.

=== Avaí ===
On 28 January 2022, Raniele was presented at Avaí, also in the first division. He scored his first goal in the category on 10 April, netting the winner in a 1–0 home success over América Mineiro, and was an ever-present figure to the side before again suffering relegation; on 16 December, he signed a permanent three-year contract with the club.

=== Cuiabá ===
On 31 March 2023, Raniele joined Cuiabá back in the top tier on a four-year deal; the club paid R$ 3.65 million for 65% of his economic rights.

=== Corinthians ===
On 2 January 2024, it was announced that Corinthians signed Raniele on a five-year deal after paying € 2.5 million for 60% of his economic rights, with the other 40% remaining with Cuiabá. Should he play in at least 60% of the club's games during the first season, Corinthians will be obliged to pay another €500,000 to acquire other 10% of his economic rights.

== Career statistics ==
As of match played 18 November 2026

Club	Season	League			State league (Note: Includes Campeonato Paulista, Campeonato Baiano, Campeonato Catarinense)		National Cup (Note: IncludesCopa do Brasil)		Continental		Other		Total	
Club	Season	Division	Apps	Goals	Apps	Goals	Apps	Goals	Apps	Goals	Apps	Goals	Apps	Goals
Ferroviária	2016	Paulista	—		0	0	0	0	—		18 (Note: Appearances in Copa Paulista)	2	18	2
Ferroviária	2017	Paulista	—		2	1	0	0	—		18	0	20	1
Ferroviária	2018	Série D	0	0	0	0	—		—		15	0	15	0
Ferroviária	2019	Série D	5	0	0	0	—		—		17	0	22	0
Ferroviária	Total		5	0	2	1	0	0	—		68	2	75	3
Taubaté (loan)	2018	Paulista A2	—		15	0	—		—		—		15	0
Penapolense (loan)	2019	Paulista A2	—		13	1	—		—		—		13	1
Portuguesa (loan)	2020	Paulista A2	—		12	0	—		—		—		12	0
Jacuipense	2020	Série C	14	0	3	1	—		—		—		17	1
Botafogo-SP (loan)	2020	Série B	11	0	—		—		—		—		11	0
Bahia (loan)	2021	Série A	11	0	8	0	0	0	0	0	2 (Note: Appearances in Copa do Nordeste)	0	21	0
Avaí	2022	Série A	33	2	8	0	0	0	—		0	0	41	2
Avaí	2023	Série B	0	0	9	0	1	0	—		—		10	0
Avaí	Total		33	2	17	0	1	0	—		0	0	51	2
Cuiabá	2023	Série A	35	3	—		—		—		—		35	3
Corinthians	2024	Série A	33	0	11	0	7	0	6 (Note: Appearances in Copa Sudamericana)	0	—		57	0
Corinthians	2025	Série A	30	2	10	0	7	0	5 (Note: Two appearances in Copa Libertadores, three appearances and one goal in Copa Sudamericana)	1	—		52	3
Corinthians	2026	Série A	23	2	7	0	3	0	7 (Note: Appearances in Copa Libertadores)	1	1 (Note: Appearance in Supercopa do Brasil)	0	41	3
Corinthians	Total		86	4	27	0	17	0	18	2	1 (Note: Appearance in Supercopa do Brasil)	0	150	6
Career total			195	9	97	3	18	0	18	2	71	2	400	16

== Personal life ==
Raniele is brother of the also footballer Eric.

== Honours ==
Ferroviária

- Copa Paulista: 2017

Bahia

- Copa do Nordeste: 2021

Corinthians

- Copa do Brasil: 2025
- Campeonato Paulista: 2025
- Supercopa do Brasil: 2026
