= Matheus Teixeira =

Brazilian footballer

Personal information
- Full name: Matheus Henrique Teixeira
- Date of birth: 8 March 1999 (age 27)
- Place of birth: José Bonifácio, Brazil
- Height: 1.87 m (6 ft 2 in)
- Position: Goalkeeper

Team information
- Current team: Capivariano
- Number: 1

Youth career
- 2013–2019: Palmeiras
- 2019–2020: Bahia

Senior career*
| Years | Team | Apps | (Gls) |
| 2020–2025 | Bahia | 34 | (0) |
| 2023 | → Oita Trinita (loan) | 5 | (0) |
| 2024 | → Criciúma (loan) | 0 | (0) |
| 2025 | Rio Ave | 1 | (0) |
| 2025– | Capivariano | 0 | (0) |
- * Club domestic league appearances and goals as of 3 November 2025

Matheus Henrique Teixeira (born 8 March 1999), known as Matheus Teixeira, is a Brazilian footballer who plays as a goalkeeper for Capivariano.

== Club career ==
Born in José Bonifácio, São Paulo, Matheus Teixeira joined Palmeiras' youth setup in 2013, aged 14. In July 2019, he left the club and joined fellow Série A club Bahia.

Promoted to the first team in 2020, Matheus Teixeira was initially a fourth-choice behind Douglas Friedrich, Anderson and Mateus Claus. He made his senior debut on 3 March 2021, starting in a 0–1 Campeonato Baiano home loss against UNIRB.

In April 2021, after Douglas tested positive for COVID-19 and Mateus Claus was injured, Matheus Teixeira became the first-choice, and helped their side to reach the finals of the 2021 Copa do Nordeste after saving two penalties.

== Career statistics ==
As of 25 October 2021

| Club | Season | League | | | State League | | Cup | | Continental | | Other | | Total | |
| Club | Season | Division | Apps | Goals | Apps | Goals | Apps | Goals | Apps | Goals | Apps | Goals | Apps | Goals |
|---|---|---|---|---|---|---|---|---|---|---|---|---|---|---|
| Bahia | 2020 | Série A | 0 | 0 | 0 | 0 | 0 | 0 | — | | 0 | 0 | 0 | 0 |
| Bahia | 2021 | Série A | 16 | 0 | 4 | 0 | 2 | 0 | 3 (Note: Appearance(s) in Copa Sudamericana) | 0 | 4 (Note: Appearance(s) in Copa do Nordeste) | 0 | 29 | 0 |
| Career total | | | 16 | 0 | 4 | 0 | 2 | 0 | 3 | 0 | 4 | 0 | 29 | 0 |

== Honours ==
Bahia

- Campeonato Baiano: 2020
- Copa do Nordeste: 2021
