= Danilo (footballer, born 2001) =

Brazilian footballer

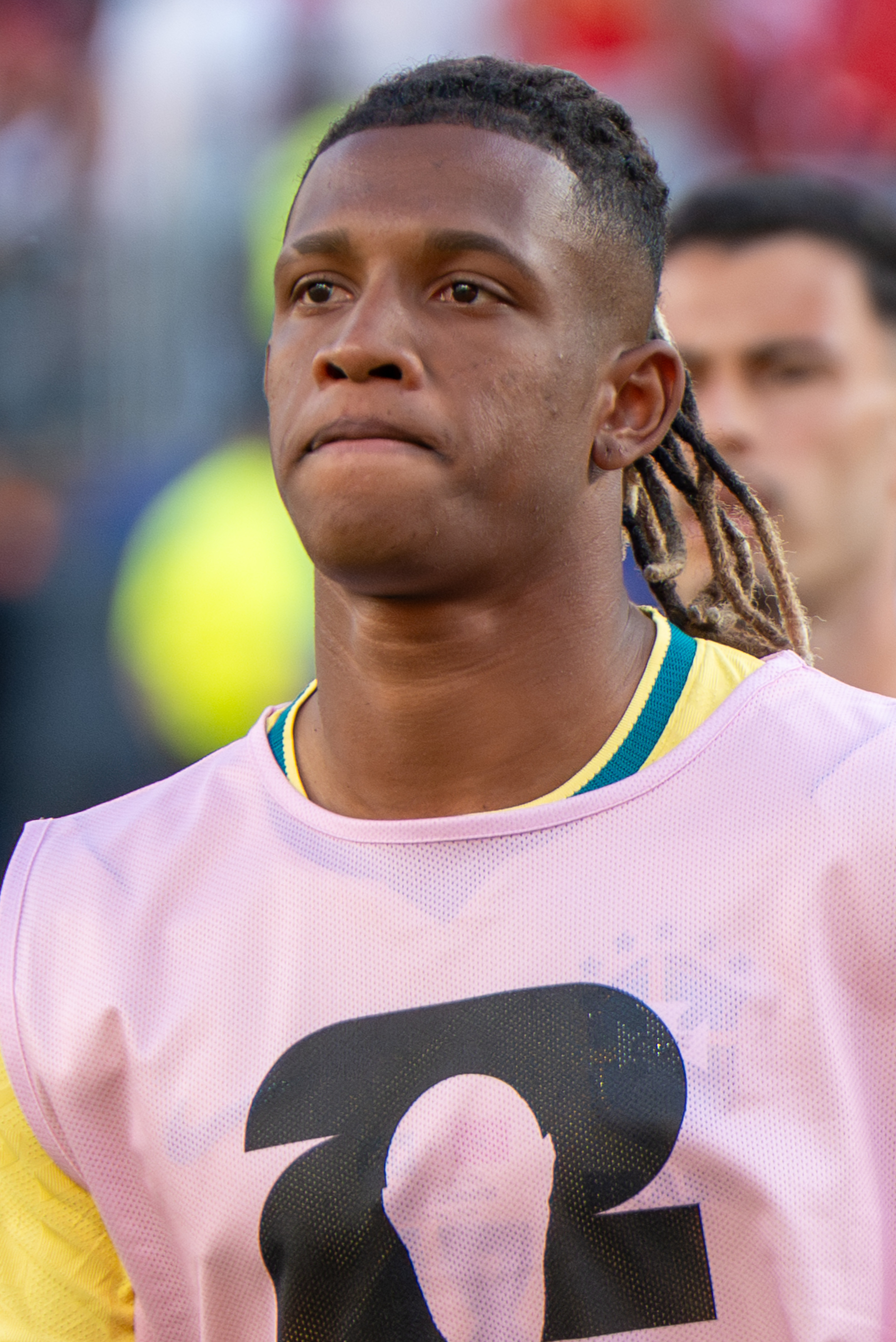
- Danilo with Brazil in 2026

Personal information
- Full name: Danilo dos Santos de Oliveira
- Date of birth: 29 April 2001 (age 25)
- Place of birth: Salvador, Brazil
- Height: 1.76 m (5 ft 9 in)
- Position: Midfielder

Team information
- Current team: Botafogo
- Number: 8

Youth career
- 2008–2015: Bahia
- 2016–2017: Jacuipense
- 2017–2020: Cajazeiras
- 2018–2020: → Palmeiras (loan)

Senior career*
| Years | Team | Apps | (Gls) |
| 2018–2020 | Cajazeiras | 1 | (0) |
| 2020–2023 | Palmeiras | 91 | (6) |
| 2023–2025 | Nottingham Forest | 50 | (5) |
| 2025– | Botafogo | 38 | (10) |

International career^{‡}
| 2026– | Brazil | 11 | (2) |
- * Club domestic league appearances and goals as of 23:18, 19 September 2026 (UTC) ‡ National team caps and goals as of 3 October 2026

Danilo dos Santos de Oliveira (born 29 April 2001), known simply as Danilo, Danilo Oliveira or Danilo Santos, (Brazilian Portuguese pronunciation: [dɐˈnilu ˈsɐ̃tus]) is a Brazilian professional footballer who plays as a midfielder for Campeonato Brasileiro Série A club Botafogo and the Brazil national team.

Born in Salvador, Danilo was in the youth academy of Bahia, before stints at Jacuipense and PFC Cajazeiras, where he was spotted by Palmeiras in 2018. After progressing steadily in Palmeiras' youth ranks, he made his first team Série A debut in 2020 at the age of 19. He was part of the Palmeiras teams who won the Copa Libertadores consecutively in 2020 and 2021, solidifying himself as a stalwart in the middle of the park and becoming a consistent first-team starter.

== Club career ==
=== Early career ===
Born in Salvador, Bahia, Danilo represented Bahia as a youth before being released by the club. In 2017, at the age of 16, he joined PFC Cajazeiras through a social project, after a short stint at Jacuipense. He made his senior debut for Cajazeiras on 5 May 2018, aged 17, by coming on as a second-half substitute in a 4–0 Campeonato Baiano Segunda Divisão home routing of Conquista.

=== Palmeiras ===
In 2018, Danilo joined Palmeiras, initially for the under-17s. He progressed through the youth setup, being later a starter for the under-20s before making his first team – and Série A – debut on 6 September 2020, replacing fellow youth graduate Patrick de Paula in a 2–1 away win against Red Bull Bragantino.

On 10 September 2020, Danilo was bought outright by Verdão, signing a permanent five-year contract with the club. He scored his first professional goal on 2 December, netting his team's fifth in a 5–0 Copa Libertadores home routing of Delfín SC.

=== Nottingham Forest ===
In January 2023, Danilo joined Premier League side Nottingham Forest for an estimated £16 million fee, signing a six-and a-half-year deal with the English club in the process.

On the opening day of the 2024–25 season against Bournemouth, he suffered a broken leg in the 8th minute, which saw him miss most of the Premiership campaign.

=== Botafogo ===
On 18 July 2025, Danilo moved to Campeonato Brasileiro Série A side Botafogo on a four-year deal for a reported fee of $25,000,000.

== International career ==
In June 2022, Danilo was called up to the Brazil national team by head coach Tite for friendlies against South Korea and Japan. However, he did not feature in either of the matches and was left out of the final squad for the 2022 FIFA World Cup.

Danilo was recalled to the national side, now by coach Carlo Ancelotti, in March 2026, for a set of friendly matches against France and Croatia later that month. On 18 May 2026, Danilo was selected for Brazil's squad for the 2026 FIFA World Cup.

== Career statistics ==
=== Club ===
As of match played 19 September 2026

Appearances and goals by club, season and competition
| Club | Season | League | | | State league (Note: Includes Campeonato Baiano Second Division, Campeonato Paulista, Campeonato Carioca) | | National cup (Note: Includes Copa do Brasil, FA Cup) | | League cup (Note: Includes EFL Cup) | | Continental | | Other | | Total | |
| Club | Season | Division | Apps | Goals | Apps | Goals | Apps | Goals | Apps | Goals | Apps | Goals | Apps | Goals | Apps | Goals |
|---|---|---|---|---|---|---|---|---|---|---|---|---|---|---|---|---|
| PFC Cajazeiras | 2018 | Baiano 2ª Divisão | — | | 1 | 0 | — | | — | | — | | — | | 1 | 0 |
| Palmeiras | 2020 | Série A | 18 | 0 | 0 | 0 | 5 | 0 | — | | 11 (Note: Appearances in Copa Libertadores) | 1 | 2 (Note: Appearances in FIFA Club World Cup) | 0 | 36 | 1 |
| Palmeiras | 2021 | Série A | 22 | 2 | 9 | 1 | 0 | 0 | — | | 13 | 1 | 5 (Note: One appearance in Supercopa do Brasil, two appearances in Recopa Sudamericana, two appearances in FIFA Club World Cup) | 0 | 49 | 4 |
| Palmeiras | 2022 | Série A | 34 | 1 | 9 | 2 | 3 | 1 | — | | 8 | 2 | 2 (Note: Appearances in Recopa Sudamericana) | 1 | 56 | 7 |
| Palmeiras | Total | | 74 | 3 | 18 | 3 | 8 | 1 | – | | 32 | 4 | 9 | 1 | 141 | 12 |
| Nottingham Forest | 2022–23 | Premier League | 13 | 3 | — | | — | | 2 | 0 | — | | — | | 15 | 3 |
| Nottingham Forest | 2023–24 | Premier League | 29 | 2 | — | | 5 | 1 | 0 | 0 | — | | — | | 34 | 3 |
| Nottingham Forest | 2024–25 | Premier League | 8 | 0 | — | | 5 | 0 | 0 | 0 | — | | — | | 13 | 0 |
| Nottingham Forest | Total | | 50 | 5 | — | | 10 | 1 | 2 | 0 | — | | — | | 62 | 6 |
| Botafogo | 2025 | Série A | 13 | 1 | — | | 2 | 0 | — | | 2 | 0 | — | | 17 | 1 |
| Botafogo | 2026 | Série A | 21 | 9 | 4 | 0 | 2 | 0 | — | | 8 (Note: Three appearances and one goal in Copa Libertadores, five appearances and two goals in Copa Sudamericana) | 3 | — | | 35 | 12 |
| Botafogo | Total | | 34 | 10 | 4 | 0 | 4 | 0 | — | | 10 | 3 | — | | 52 | 13 |
| Career total | | | 158 | 18 | 23 | 3 | 22 | 2 | 2 | 0 | 42 | 7 | 9 | 1 | 256 | 31 |

=== International ===
As of match played 5 July 2026

Appearances and goals by national team and year
| National team | Year | Apps | Goals |
|---|---|---|---|
| Brazil | 2026 | 8 | 2 |
| Total | | 8 | 2 |

Scores and results list Brazil's goal tally first.

List of international goals scored by Danilo
| No. | Date | Venue | Cap | Opponent | Score | Result | Competition |
|---|---|---|---|---|---|---|---|
| 1 | 31 March 2026 | Camping World Stadium, Orlando, United States | 2 | Croatia | 1–0 | 3–1 | Friendly |
| 2 | 31 May 2026 | Estádio do Maracanã, Rio de Janeiro, Brazil | 3 | Panama | 6–1 | 6–2 | Friendly |

== Honours ==
Palmeiras

- Série A: 2022
- Copa do Brasil: 2020
- Copa Libertadores: 2020, 2021
- Recopa Sudamericana: 2022
- Campeonato Paulista: 2022
- FIFA Club World Cup runner-up: 2021

Individual

- FIFA Club World Cup Bronze Ball: 2021
- Campeonato Paulista Team of the Year: 2022
- Campeonato Carioca Team of the year: 2026
