= Wendell Santos =

Brazilian footballer

Personal information
- Full name: Wendell dos Santos Sacramento
- Date of birth: 31 August 2005 (age 21)
- Place of birth: Salvador, Brazil
- Height: 1.76 m (5 ft 9 in)
- Position: Midfielder

Team information
- Current team: Vitória
- Number: 41

Youth career
- Ypiranga-BA
- PFC Cajazeiras
- 2023–: Atlético Guaratinguetá
- 2023–2025: → Palmeiras (loan)
- 2025–: → Vitória (loan)

Senior career*
Years	Team	Apps	(Gls)
2025–	Atlético Guaratinguetá	0	(0)
2025–	→ Vitória (loan)	1	(0)
- * Club domestic league appearances and goals as of 21:36, 16 September 2025 (UTC)

Wendell dos Santos Sacramento (born 31 August 2005), known as Wendell Santos or just Wendell, is a Brazilian footballer who plays as a midfielder for Vitória, on loan from Atlético Guaratinguetá.

== Career ==
Born in Salvador, Bahia, Wendell played for Ypiranga-BA, PFC Cajazeiras and Atlético Guaratinguetá before joining Palmeiras on loan in June 2023. On 13 February 2025, he moved to Vitória also on loan from Atlético Guaratinguetá.

After playing in the under-20 team, Wendell made his professional – and Série A – debut on 25 August 2025, starting in a 8–0 heavy loss to Flamengo.

== Career statistics ==
As of 16 September 2025

Club	Season	League			State league		Cup		Continental		Other		Total	
Club	Season	Division	Apps	Goals	Apps	Goals	Apps	Goals	Apps	Goals	Apps	Goals	Apps	Goals
Vitória	2025	Série A	1	0	—		—		—		—		1	0
Career total			1	0	0	0	0	0	0	0	0	0	1	0
