= Mateus Claus =

Brazilian footballer

Personal information
- Full name: Mateus Eduardo Claus
- Date of birth: 3 August 1994 (age 32)
- Place of birth: Campo Bom, Brazil
- Height: 1.94 m (6 ft 4 in)
- Position: Goalkeeper

Team information
- Current team: Guarani
- Number: 77

Youth career
- 15 de Novembro
- Veranópolis
- 2013–2014: → Internacional (loan)

Senior career*
Years	Team	Apps	(Gls)
2015–2016	Veranópolis	0	(0)
2015	→ Caxias (loan)	0	(0)
2017–2020	Pelotas	4	(0)
2018	→ Marcílio Dias (loan)	1	(0)
2019	→ Glória (loan)	1	(0)
2020	→ Bahia (loan)	3	(0)
2020–2023	Bahia	31	(0)
2024–2025	Juventude	6	(0)
2026–	Guarani	2	(0)
- * Club domestic league appearances and goals as of 10 November 2026

Mateus Eduardo Claus (born 3 August 1994) is a Brazilian footballer who plays as a goalkeeper for Guarani.

== Club career ==
Born in Campo Bom, Rio Grande do Sul, Claus was a Veranópolis youth graduate. He was promoted to the main squad for the 2015 season, also serving a loan at Caxias, but did not play for either side in the campaign.

Claus joined Pelotas in 2016, being initially a backup and subsequently serving loans at Marcílio Dias and Glória. He was only a first-choice in the club's Copa FGF campaigns in 2018 and 2019, lifting the trophy in the latter.

On 20 December 2019, Claus joined Bahia on loan for the 2020 Campeonato Baiano. The following 27 May, he signed a permanent deal with the club until the end of the season.

Claus made his Série A on 6 September 2020, starting in a 2–2 away draw against Internacional. On 17 December 2020, he signed a new deal with the Esquadrão until May 2021, and agreed to a three-year contract on 2 April 2021.

Mainly a backup option, Claus left Bahia in December 2023, as his contract was due to expire. On 30 January 2024, he signed for fellow top tier side Juventude, as a cover for injured Renan.

== Career statistics ==
As of 22 February 2024

Club	Season	League			State League		Cup		Continental		Other		Total	
Club	Season	Division	Apps	Goals	Apps	Goals	Apps	Goals	Apps	Goals	Apps	Goals	Apps	Goals
Veranópolis	2015	Gaúcho	—		0	0	—		—		—		0	0
Veranópolis	2016	Gaúcho	—		0	0	—		—		—		0	0
Veranópolis	Total		—		0	0	—		—		—		0	0
Caxias	2015	Série C	0	0	—		—		—		—		0	0
Pelotas	2016	Gaúcho Série A2	—		0	0	—		—		0	0	0	0
Pelotas	2017	Gaúcho Série A2	—		4	0	—		—		—		4	0
Pelotas	2018	Gaúcho Série A2	—		0	0	—		—		11 (Note: Appearance(s) in Copa FGF)	0	11	0
Pelotas	2019	Gaúcho	—		0	0	—		—		14	0	14	0
Pelotas	Total		—		4	0	—		—		25	0	29	0
Marcílio Dias (loan)	2017	Catarinense Série B	—		1	0	—		—		—		1	0
Glória (loan)	2019	Gaúcho Série A2	—		1	0	—		—		—		1	0
Bahia	2020	Série A	3	0	7	0	0	0	0	0	0	0	10	0
Bahia	2021	Série A	6	0	0	0	1	0	1 (Note: Appearance(s) in Copa Sudamericana)	0	0	0	8	0
Bahia	2022	Série B	14	0	1	0	0	0	—		1 (Note: Appearance(s) in Copa do Nordeste)	0	16	0
Bahia	2023	Série A	1	0	2	0	0	0	—		0	0	3	0
Bahia	Total		24	0	10	0	1	0	1	0	1	0	37	0
Juventude	2024	Série A	0	0	1	0	0	0	—		—		1	0
Career total			24	0	17	0	1	0	2	0	25	0	73	0

== Honours ==
Pelotas

- Campeonato Gaúcho Série A2: 2018
- Copa FGF: 2019

Bahia

- Campeonato Baiano: 2020, 2023
- Copa do Nordeste: 2021
