= Vítor Jacaré =

Brazilian footballer (born 1999)

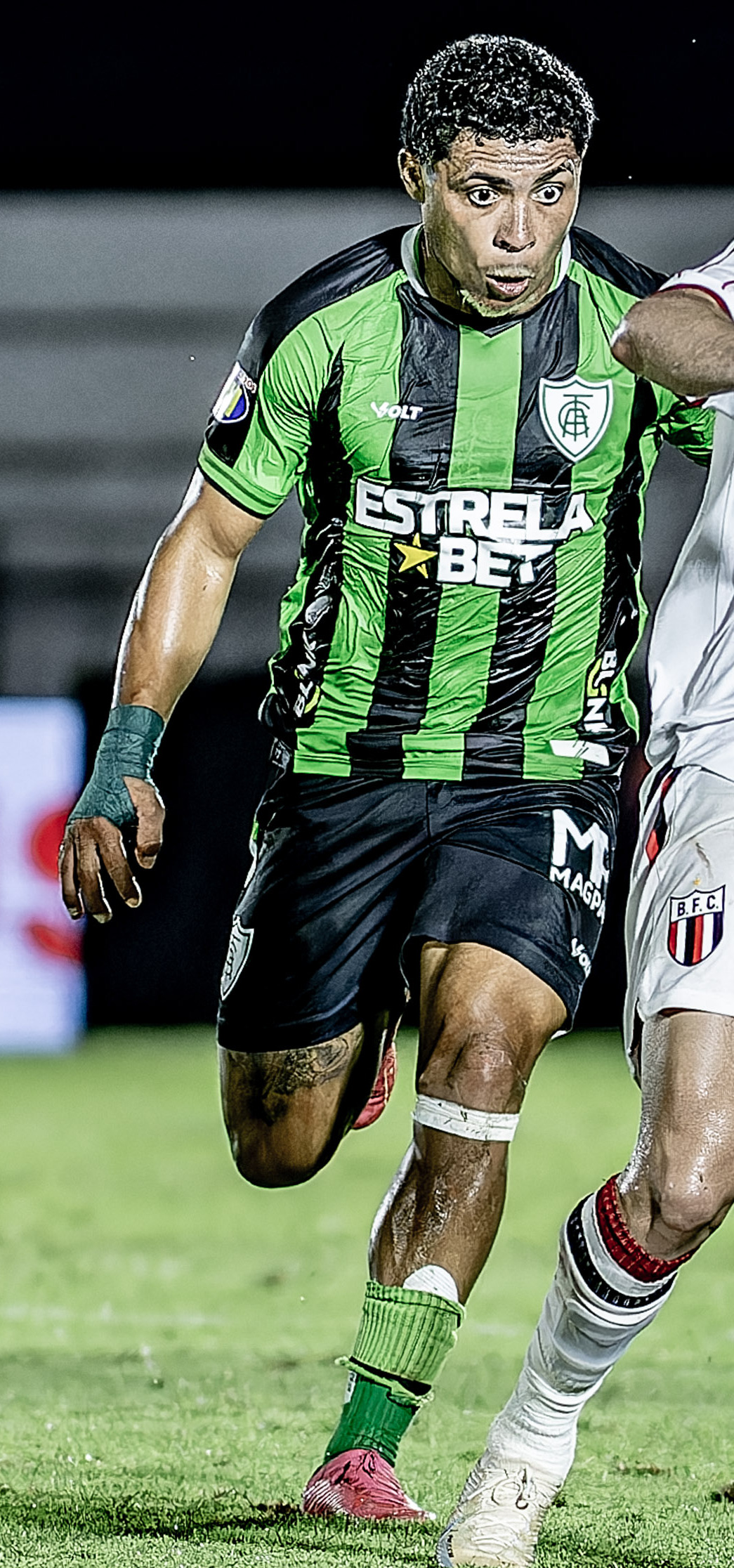

Personal information
- Full name: Francisco Vítor Silva Costa
- Date of birth: 24 October 1999 (age 27)
- Place of birth: Caririaçu, Brazil
- Height: 1.68 m (5 ft 6 in)
- Position: Forward

Team information
- Current team: [Londrina]

Senior career*
Years	Team	Apps	(Gls)
2017–2019	Icasa	0	(0)
2018–2019	→ Fortaleza (loan)	1	(0)
2019–2020	Caucaia	11	(5)
2020–2022	Ceará	12	(2)
2022–2023	Bahia	62	(12)
2024–2025	América Mineiro	0	(0)
2026-	Londrina	0	(0)
- * Club domestic league appearances and goals as of 00:15, April 28, 2023 (UTC)

Francisco Vítor Silva Costa (born 24 October 1999), known as Vítor Jacaré or just Jacaré, is a Brazilian footballer who plays as a forward for América Mineiro.

== Club career ==
Born in Caririaçu, Ceará, Jacaré never played in any youth setup until 2017, when he impressed while playing for an amateur side and subsequently joined Icasa. He made his senior debut with the side on 20 August of that year, starting in a 0–0 home draw against Caucaia, for the 2017 Copa Fares Lopes.

After only one further match, Jacaré was loaned to Fortaleza, where he featured mainly for the under-20 side and played one first team match in the Campeonato Cearense. In April 2019, after returning from loan, he rescinded with his parent club after alleging unpaid wages, and signed for Caucaia in the following month.

On 27 February 2020, after helping Caucaia win the Campeonato Cearense Série B and the Copa Fares Lopes, Jacaré signed a pre-contract with Ceará. He was officially announced on 3 June, agreeing to a deal until December 2022.

Jacaré made his Série A debut on 8 August 2020, coming on as a half-time substitute for Rafael Sóbis in a 2–3 away loss against Sport Recife, also scoring his team's second goal of the match. In March of the following year, he suffered a knee injury which kept him out for eight months.

After returning from injury, Jacaré played in four matches in the 2022 season before rescinding his contract on 16 March, and joined Bahia.

== Career statistics ==
As of 13 March 2023

Club	Season	League			State League		Cup		Continental		Other		Total	
Club	Season	Division	Apps	Goals	Apps	Goals	Apps	Goals	Apps	Goals	Apps	Goals	Apps	Goals
Icasa	2017	Cearense Série B	—		0	0	—		—		2 (Note: Appearance(s) in Copa Fares Lopes)	0	2	0
Fortaleza	2018	Série B	0	0	1	0	—		—		0	0	1	0
Caucaia	2019	Cearense Série B	—		6	2	—		—		10	2	16	4
Caucaia	2020	Cearense	—		11	5	1	1	—		—		12	6
Caucaia	Total		—		17	7	1	1	—		10	2	28	10
Ceará	2020	Série A	10	1	—		—		—		1 (Note: Appearance(s) in Copa do Nordeste)	0	11	1
Ceará	2021	Série A	0	0	1	1	0	0	—		3	1	4	2
Ceará	2022	Série A	0	0	1	0	0	0	—		3	0	4	0
Ceará	Total		10	1	2	1	0	0	—		6	1	19	3
Bahia	2022	Série B	36	6	—		4	0	—		—		40	6
Bahia	2023	Série A	0	0	7	0	2	1	—		5	2	14	3
Bahia	Total		36	6	7	0	2	1	—		5	2	54	9
Career total			46	7	27	8	7	2	0	0	23	5	103	22

== Honours ==
Caucaia

- Campeonato Cearense Série B: 2019
- Copa Fares Lopes: 2019

Bahia

- Campeonato Baiano: 2023
