= João Leonardo =

João Leonardo may refer to:

- João Leonardo (footballer, born 1985), João Leonardo de Paula Reginato, Brazilian football centre-back
- João Leonardo (footballer, born 1994), João Leonardo Risuenho do Rosário, Brazilian football striker
