= Caíque Sá =

Brazilian footballer (born 1992)

Personal information
- Full name: Caíque Silva Sá
- Date of birth: 23 May 1992 (age 34)
- Place of birth: Riachão do Jacuípe, Brazil
- Height: 1.72 m (5 ft 7 1/2 in)
- Position: Defender

Senior career*
Years	Team	Apps	(Gls)
2011–2015	Jacuipense	28	(0)
2013	→ Sampaio Corrêa (loan)	1	(0)
2015	→ Confiança (loan)	1	(0)
2016	Confiança	33	(3)
2016–2017	Joinville	18	(0)
2017	→ Vitória (loan)	18	(0)
2018–2019	Goiás	30	(1)
2019	→ Chapecoense (loan)	4	(0)
2020	Botafogo-SP	13	(0)
2020–2022	Confiança	26	(3)
2022–2023	Jacuipense	3	(0)
- * Club domestic league appearances and goals as of 2 April 2023

Caíque Silva Sá (born 23 May 1992), known as Caíque Sá, is a Brazilian footballer who plays as a right back.

== Career statistics ==
As of 29 November 2019

Club	Season	League			State League		Cup		Continental		Other		Total	
Club	Season	Division	Apps	Goals	Apps	Goals	Apps	Goals	Apps	Goals	Apps	Goals	Apps	Goals
Jacuipense	2013	Baiano	—		6	0	—		—		—		6	0
Jacuipense	2014	Série D	11	0	11	0	—		—		—		22	0
Jacuipense	Subtotal		11	0	17	0	—		—		—		28	0
Sampaio Corrêa	2013	Série C	—		—		1	0	—		—		1	0
Confiança	2015	Série C	1	0	—		—		—		—		1	0
Confiança	2016	Série C	13	1	14	1	1	0	—		5 (Note: Appearance(s) in Copa do Nordeste)	1	33	3
Confiança	Subtotal		14	1	14	1	1	0	—		5	1	34	3
Joinville	2017	Série C	0	0	13	0	4	0	—		1 (Note: Appearance(s) in Primeira Liga)	0	18	0
Vitória	2017	Série A	18	0	—		—		—		—		18	0
Goiás	2018	Série B	9	1	8	0	5	0	—		—		22	1
Goiás	2019	Série A	0	0	8	0	0	0	—		—		8	0
Goiás	Subtotal		9	1	16	0	5	0	—		—		30	1
Chapecoense	2019	Série A	2	0	—		—		—		—		2	0
Career total			54	2	60	1	11	0	0	0	6	1	131	4
