= Danilo Fernandes =

Brazilian footballer (born 1988)

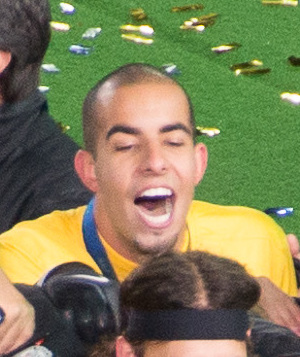
- Danilo Fernandes celebrate with Corinthians after winning the 2012 FIFA Club World Cup Final

Personal information
- Full name: Danilo Fernandes Batista
- Date of birth: 3 April 1988 (age 38)
- Place of birth: Guarulhos, Brazil
- Height: 1.89 m (6 ft 2 in)
- Position: Goalkeeper

Team information
- Current team: Bahia
- Number: 1

Youth career
- 2007–2010: Corinthians

Senior career*
Years	Team	Apps	(Gls)
2011–2014	Corinthians	23	(0)
2015–2016	Sport Recife	53	(0)
2016–2021	Internacional	104	(0)
2021	→ Bahia (loan)	16	(0)
2022–	Bahia	34	(0)
- * Club domestic league appearances and goals as of 14:25, 28 July 2025 (UTC)

Danilo Fernandes Batista (born 3 April 1988) is a Brazilian professional footballer who plays as a goalkeeper for Bahia.

== Club career ==
Danilo Fernandes Batista, born in Guarulhos-SP, was revealed in the youth categories of Corinthians. He moved to Sport in 2015. In 2016 he signed contract with Internacional. Danilo and fellow player Matheus Bahia were injured in the 2022 EC Bahia bus attack.

== International career ==
In January 2017, he called to Brazilian team by coach Tite for a friendly game against Colombia. Only footballers playing for Brazilian clubs were called up.
