= Geovane (footballer, born March 1999) =

Brazilian footballer

Personal information
- Full name: Geovane da Silva de Souza
- Date of birth: 2 March 1999 (age 27)
- Place of birth: Salvador, Brazil
- Height: 1.70 m (5 ft 7 in)
- Position: Midfielder

Team information
- Current team: CRB (on loan from Epitsentr Kamianets-Podilskyi)
- Number: 18

Youth career
- 2014–2016: Grêmio
- 2017: Palmeiras
- 2017–2018: Atlântico
- 2018: Jacuipense
- 2018–2020: Ituano
- 2020–2021: Ceará

Senior career*
Years	Team	Apps	(Gls)
2021–2024	Ceará	29	(0)
2023	→ Paysandu (loan)	20	(0)
2024	→ Santo André (loan)	10	(0)
2024	Vila Nova	12	(0)
2024–2025	Portimonense	25	(0)
2025–	Epitsentr Kamianets-Podilskyi	9	(1)
2026–	→ CRB (loan)	22	(1)
- * Club domestic league appearances and goals as of 16 November 2026

Geovane da Silva de Souza (born 2 March 1999), simply known as Geovane, is a Brazilian footballer who plays as a midfielder for CRB, on loan from Ukrainian Premier League club Epitsentr Kamianets-Podilskyi.

== Club career ==
Geovane was born in Salvador, Bahia, Geovane played for Grêmio, Palmeiras, Atlântico, Jacuipense and Ituano as a youth, before joining Ceará in 2020, initially for the under-23 squad. He made his first team debut on 1 March 2021, coming on as a second-half substitute for William Oliveira in a 1–1 away draw against ABC, for the year's Copa do Nordeste.

On 3 September 2021, Geovane renewed his contract until 2023. He made his Série A debut fifteen days later, starting in a 0–0 home draw against Santos.

On 31 March 2023, Ceará agreed to loan Geovane to Série C side Paysandu for the remainder of the year.

On 9 September 2025, Geovane signed with Epitsentr Kamianets-Podilskyi in Ukraine.

== Career statistics ==
As of 13 April 2023

Club	Season	League			State League		Cup		Continental		Other		Total	
Club	Season	Division	Apps	Goals	Apps	Goals	Apps	Goals	Apps	Goals	Apps	Goals	Apps	Goals
Ceará	2021	Série A	3	0	5	0	1	0	1 (Note: Appearance(s) in Copa Sudamericana)	0	2 (Note: One appearance in Copa do Nordeste, one appearance and one goal in Copa Fares Lopes)	1	12	1
Ceará	2022	Série A	17	0	1	0	2	0	4	0	1 (Note: Appearance(s) in Copa do Nordeste)	0	25	0
Ceará	2023	Série B	0	0	3	0	0	0	—		5	0	8	0
Ceará	Total		20	0	9	0	3	0	5	0	8	1	45	1
Paysandu (loan)	2023	Série C	0	0	1	0	1	0	—		—		2	0
Career total			20	0	10	0	4	0	5	0	8	1	47	1
