= Danielzinho (footballer, born 1996) =

Brazilian footballer

Personal information
- Full name: Daniel Sampaio Simões
- Date of birth: 11 January 1996 (age 30)
- Place of birth: Rio de Janeiro, Brazil
- Height: 1.73 m (5 ft 8 in)
- Position: Midfielder

Team information
- Current team: CRB
- Number: 10

Youth career
- 2003–2016: Fluminense

Senior career*
Years	Team	Apps	(Gls)
2016–2019	Fluminense	53	(1)
2016	→ Oeste (loan)	13	(0)
2017	→ Oeste (loan)	33	(1)
2018	→ Botafogo-SP (loan)	13	(0)
2018	→ Oeste (loan)	16	(1)
2020–2023	Bahia	120	(9)
2023–	Fluminense	13	(0)
2024	→ Atlético Goianiense (loan)	10	(1)
2024	Dibba Al-Hisn	1	(0)
2025-	CRB	88	(10)
- * Club domestic league appearances and goals as of 16 November 2026

Daniel Sampaio Simões (born 11 January 1996), known as Danielzinho or simply Daniel, is a Brazilian footballer who plays as midfielder for CRB.

== Club career ==
=== Fluminense ===
Born in Rio de Janeiro, Daniel joined Fluminense's youth setup in 2003, aged seven. He made his first team debut on 27 January 2016, starting in a 0–1 Primeira Liga loss against Atlético Paranaense.

After being rarely used, Daniel was loaned to Série B side Oeste on 19 July 2016. He returned to Flu for the 2017 season, but was again loaned to Oeste after featuring rarely.

Daniel started the 2018 campaign on loan at Botafogo-SP, and returned to Oeste for the 2018 Série B before being recalled by Fluminense on 2 August 2018. He made his Série A debut late in the month, coming on as a late substitute for Junior Sornoza in a 1–2 away loss against Cruzeiro.

Daniel became a regular starter for Fluminense in the 2019 season, but did not reach an agreement to renew his contract with the club.

=== Bahia ===
On 12 December 2019, Daniel signed a two-year contract with fellow top tier side Bahia.

== Career statistics ==
As of 10 March 2023.

Club	Season	League			State League		Cup		Continental		Other		Total	
Club	Season	Division	Apps	Goals	Apps	Goals	Apps	Goals	Apps	Goals	Apps	Goals	Apps	Goals
Fluminense	2016	Série A	0	0	5	0	0	0	—		2 (Note: Appearance(s) in Primeira Liga)	0	7	0
Fluminense	2017	Série A	0	0	1	0	0	0	—		2	1	3	1
Fluminense	2018	Série A	5	0	0	0	0	0	1 (Note: Appearance(s) in Copa Sudamericana)	0	—		6	0
Fluminense	2019	Série A	30	1	12	0	6	0	8	0	—		56	1
Fluminense	Total		35	1	18	0	6	0	9	0	4	1	72	2
Oeste (loan)	2016	Série B	13	0	—		0	0	—		—		13	0
Oeste (loan)	2017	Série B	33	1	—		0	0	—		—		33	1
Botafogo-SP (loan)	2018	Série C	0	0	13	0	0	0	—		—		13	0
Oeste (loan)	2018	Série B	16	1	—		0	0	—		—		16	1
Bahia	2020	Série A	29	3	5	1	1	0	5	0	7 (Note: Appearance(s) in Copa do Nordeste)	1	47	5
Bahia	2021	Série A	31	1	0	0	5	0	6	0	11	0	53	1
Bahia	2022	Série B	33	3	7	1	4	0	—		8	1	52	5
Bahia	2023	Série A	0	0	7	0	1	0	—		5	0	13	0
Bahia	Total		93	7	19	2	11	0	11	0	31	2	165	11
Career total			190	10	50	2	17	0	20	0	35	3	312	15

== Honours ==
Bahia

- Campeonato Baiano: 2020, 2023
- Copa do Nordeste: 2021

Fluminense

- Copa Libertadores: 2023
