= 2022 EC Bahia bus attack =

2022 association football bus attack in Brazil

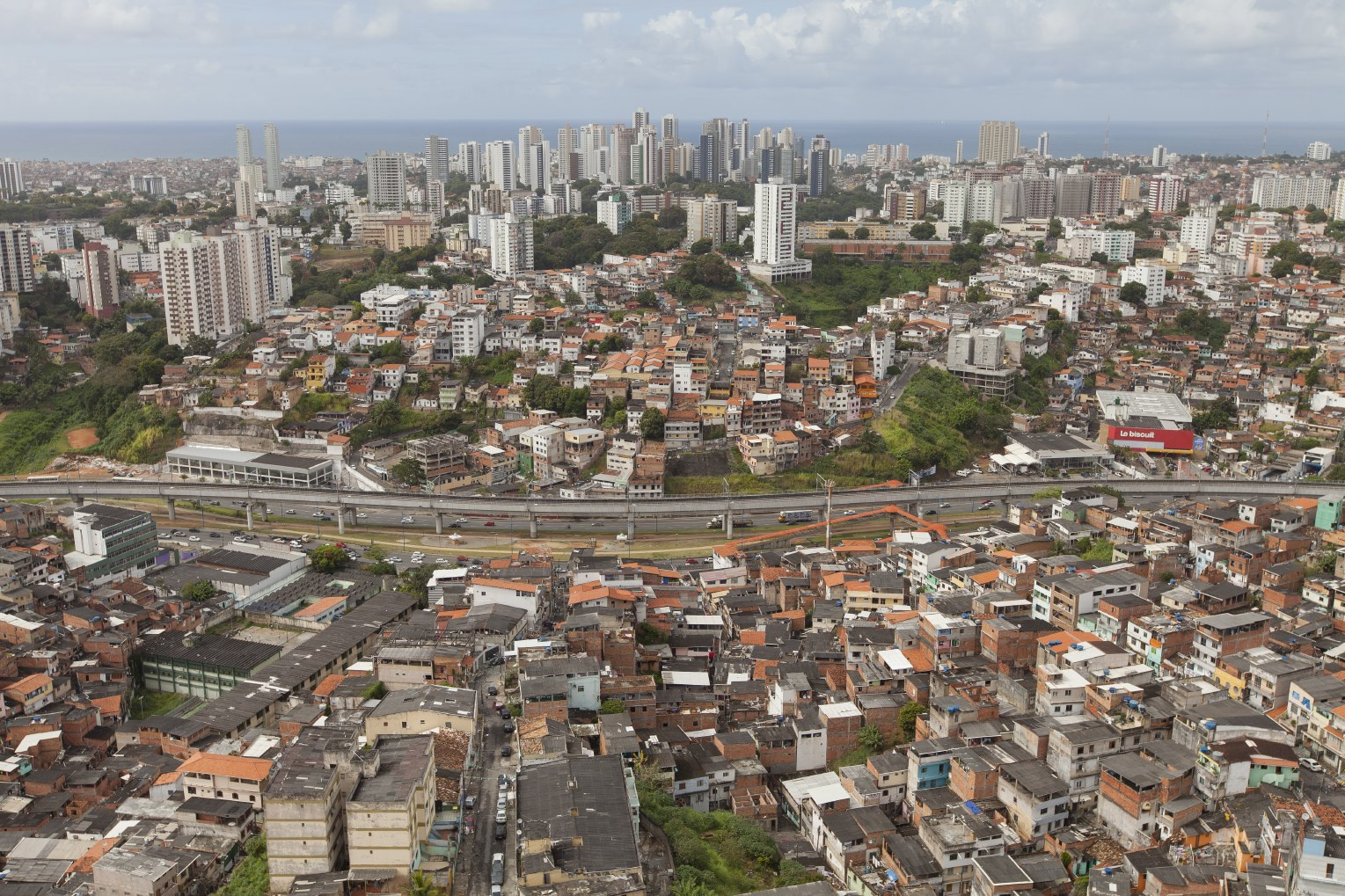
- Aerial view of Avenida Bonocô, where the attack took place, in 2012.
- Location: Salvador, Bahia, Brazil
- Date: February 24, 2022 c. 7:50 p.m. (GMT-3)
- Target: Esporte Clube Bahia players
- Weapon: Improvised explosive device
- Deaths: 0
- Injuries: 2
- No. of participants: 7
- Motive: Football hooliganism, possible dissatisfaction with the team's relegation and performance.
- Accused: 4
- Charges: Attempted murder

On February 24, 2022, an improvised explosive device was thrown at a bus transporting players of the Brazilian association football team Esporte Clube Bahia on their way to a match against Sampaio Corrêa Futebol Clube in the city of Salvador. Two players were wounded by shrapnel, and the bus as well as a nearby passing car and motorcycle were damaged by the blast. The case is under investigation by Bahia state's Civil Police and Public Prosecutor's Office, and the main suspects are members of EC Bahia's local torcida organizada (organized supporters), Bamor.

== Attack ==
At 5:40 p.m., a white Hyundai HB20 and a green Renault Duster Oroch arrived at Salvador's Avenida Bonocô avenue and pulled over. A total of six men exited the cars and stood on the road waiting for the team's bus, while one driver waited in one of the vehicles. As it drove by at around 7:50 p.m., the men attacked the bus with bombs, fireworks and other unidentified projectiles, and then fled the scene.

A passing civilian car was also caught by the blast, which shattered its rear-left window. The driver, a school teacher, was not injured. A motorcycle belonging to a police officer was also damaged.

== Aftermath ==
Two members of EC Bahia's squad were injured: goalkeeper Danilo Fernandes was hit on his face by shrapnel and shards of glass, and left-back Matheus Bahia had his arm cut by shrapnel; forward Marcelo Cirino was initially reported to have suffered unspecified injuries, however the club's physician later clarified that he had been simply startled by the explosion and was not hit by any fragments, though he did not participate in the match later that night.

Despite the apprehension following the attack, the team still decided to carry out its planned Copa do Nordeste match against Sampaio Corrêa, without Danilo, Matheus and Marcelo, ultimately winning with a score of 2–0.

Danilo was the most badly wounded among the victims, having shrapnel lodged in his neck and dangerously close to his eye, and was hospitalized for one day and sidelined from future matches while undergoing several ophthalmological appointments and treatments. Marcelo departed from the club one week after the attack, citing related "personal reasons."

== Investigation ==
On the next day, February 25, the police identified the vehicles used by the attackers as belonging to Half Silva, president of Torcida Organizada Bamor, EC Bahia's local organized supporter chapter. They were found in the organization's headquarters and confiscated. Silva was detained and questioned by the police, where he claimed that he was away in Feira de Santana at the moment of the attack. Two other suspects, also members of Bamor, were detained and spent a night in jail. On March 09, the chief of police in charge of the case, Francineide Moura, stated that the suspects, all of whom are members of Bamor, have been identified, that arrest warrants would soon be issued and that they will be charged with attempted murder. She also claimed that Bamor never cooperated with or assisted the investigations.

Bamor denies any allegations of involvement. On the same day of the attack, the organization issued a note repudiating the bombing, calling it an "act of vandalism," as well as criticizing the "unfounded position on the press's part" for accusing its members of taking part in the attack. The organization's attorney claimed that there was no attack and that "it could have been an accident" involving a reception with fireworks.

On February 24, 2024, the second anniversary of the attack, Globo Esporte reported that no arrests had been made thus far and that no trial is scheduled for the suspects. The report also mentioned supporter frustration with the team's relegation to the Série B league in 2021 and general dissatisfaction with the team's performance as possible motivations for the attack.

== Reactions ==
The bombing was met with widespread condemnation from Brazil's football community and authorities. Various football clubs issued notes expressing solidarity and support towards EC Bahia, including Flamengo, Fluminense, Santos, Cruzeiro, Vasco and Corinthians. Bahia state governor Rui Costa denounced the attack on his Twitter, stating "Nothing justifies the cowardly attack on Bahia's bus this Thursday night," saying "Players [...] are professionals and deserve respect." The same was done by Salvador mayor Bruno Soares Reis, who called the attack "regrettable". CONMEBOL also condemned the attack, stating "Conmebol condemns the attack perpetrated against the bus that transported members of the Bahia club [...] Football is synonymous of peace and tolerance. Violence destroys sport."

The attack was also noted in Brazil for having garnered international media attention, with many reports citing the unusual circumstances of the attack; although acts of vandalism against football team buses and intimidation towards players are not uncommon in the country, the use of explosives and coordinated assaults is quite rare. Spain's Diario AS and Argentina's Olé reported on the attack, the latter emphasizing in its report that Argentine EC Bahia player Lucas Mugni was unharmed.
