= Eric (footballer, born 2000) =

Brazilian footballer

Personal information
- Full name: Eric Almeida de Melo
- Date of birth: 7 August 2000 (age 26)
- Place of birth: Baixa Grande, Brazil
- Height: 1.80 m (5 ft 11 in)
- Position: Left-back

Team information
- Current team: Cuiabá
- Number: 14

Senior career*
Years	Team	Apps	(Gls)
2019	São-Carlense	7	(0)
2020–2021	Itapirense	9	(1)
2022	Tupynambás	16	(0)
2022	Nação	0	(0)
2023–2024	Jacuipense	19	(0)
2024	→ Vila Nova (loan)	16	(0)
2024–2026	Ceará	8	(0)
2025	→ Ferroviária (loan)	16	(0)
2026–	Cuiabá	18	(1)
- * Club domestic league appearances and goals as of 18 November 2026

Eric Almeida de Melo (born 7 August 2000), simply known as Eric, is a Brazilian professional footballer who plays as a left-back for Cuiabá.

== Career ==
Eric began his career playing for teams in the lower divisions of the state of São Paulo. He also defended Tupynambás and Nação, before arriving at Jacuipense, where he stood out in Série D in 2023. In 2024, he was announced as a reinforcement by Vila Nova.

In August 2024, Eric was acquired by Ceará. In February 2025, he was loaned to Ferroviária.

== Personal life ==
Eric is brother of fellow footballer Raniele.
