= 2020 Campeonato Baiano =

Campeonato Baiano
- Season: 2020
- Champions: Bahia
- Relegated: Jacobina
- Copa do Brasil: Atlético de Alagoinhas; Bahia; Juazeirense
- Série D: Atlético de Alagoinhas; Bahia de Feira; Juazeirense
- Copa do Nordeste: Bahia; Vitória (via RNC)
- Pré-Copa do Nordeste: Atlético de Alagoinhas
- Matches: 51
- Goals: 141 (2.76 per match)
- Top goalscorer: Marcelo Nicácio (8 goals)

The 2020 Campeonato Baiano (officially the Campeonato Baiano de Futebol Profissional Série “A” – Edição 2020) was the 116th edition of Bahia's top professional football league. The competition began on 22 January and ended on 8 August. On 17 March 2020, FBF suspended the Campeonato Baiano indefinitely due to the COVID-19 pandemic in Brazil. The tournament resumed behind closed doors on 23 July 2020.

The finals between Bahia, the defending champions, and Atlético de Alagoinhas finished in a 1–1 draw on aggregate, but Bahia clinched their 49th title by winning 7–6 on penalties.

== Format ==
In the first stage, each team played the other nine teams in a single round-robin tournament. Top four teams advanced to the semi-finals. The team with the lowest number of points was relegated to the Série B do Campeonato Baiano de 2021.

The final stage was played on a home-and-away two-legged basis with the higher-seeded team hosting the second leg. If tied on aggregate, the penalty shoot-out would be used to determine the winner.

Champions qualified for the 2021 Copa do Brasil and 2021 Copa do Nordeste, while runners-up and third place only qualified for the 2021 Copa do Brasil. Top three teams not already qualified for 2021 Série A, Série B or Série C qualified for 2021 Campeonato Brasileiro Série D.

== Participating teams ==
Club	Home city
Atlético de Alagoinhas	Alagoinhas
Bahia	Salvador
Bahia de Feira	Feira de Santana
Doce Mel	Ipiaú
Fluminense de Feira	Feira de Santana
Jacobina	Jacobina
Jacuipense	Riachão do Jacuípe
Juazeirense	Juazeiro
Vitória	Salvador
Vitória da Conquista	Vitória da Conquista

== First stage ==
Pos	Team	Pld	W	D	L	GF	GA	GD	Pts	Qualification or relegation
1	Bahia	9	5	3	1	12	5	+7	18	Advance to Semi-finals
2	Atlético de Alagoinhas	9	5	2	2	11	9	+2	17	Advance to Semi-finals
3	Juazeirense	9	4	4	1	19	12	+7	16	Advance to Semi-finals
4	Jacuipense	9	4	3	2	15	9	+6	15	Advance to Semi-finals
5	Vitória	9	3	4	2	13	12	+1	13	
6	Bahia de Feira	9	3	3	3	12	11	+1	12	
7	Vitória da Conquista	9	2	4	3	9	12	−3	10	
8	Fluminense de Feira	9	2	3	4	18	19	−1	9	
9	Doce Mel	9	1	5	3	14	18	−4	8	
10	Jacobina (R)	9	0	1	8	3	19	−16	1	Relegation to Campeonato Baiano Série B

Source: FBF
Rules for classification: 1) Points; 2) Wins; 3) Goal difference; 4) Goals scored; 5) Head-to-head result; 6) Fewest red cards; 7) Fewest yellow cards; 8) Draw.
(R) Relegated

== Final stage ==
=== Semi-finals ===
Team 1	Agg.	Team 2	1st leg	2nd leg
Jacuipense	2–4	Bahia	0–2	2–2
Juazeirense	3–4	Atlético de Alagoinhas	1–4	2–0

==== Group 2 ====
30 July 2020
17:30

Jacuipense	0–2	Bahia
	Report	Marco Antônio 37'; Alesson 63'

Estádio Eliel Martins, Riachão do Jacuípe
Attendance: 0
Referee: Marielson Alves Silva

2 August 2020
16:00

Bahia	2–2	Jacuipense
Jadson 35'; Jeferson Douglas 78'	Report	Rafael Bastos 68'; Raniele 79'

Estádio de Pituaçu, Salvador
Attendance: 0
Referee: Eziquiel Sousa Costa

Bahia qualified for the finals.

==== Group 3 ====
29 July 2020
21:30

Juazeirense	1–4	Atlético de Alagoinhas
Saulo 27' (o.g.)	Report	Magno Alves 32'; Edílson 34'; Lucas Alisson 81'; Dedeco 90'

Estádio Adauto Moraes, Juazeiro
Attendance: 0
Referee: Diego Pombo Lopez

2 August 2020
16:00

Atlético de Alagoinhas	0–2	Juazeirense
	Report	Jeam 4'; Nino Guerreiro 75'

Estádio Municipal Antônio de Figueiredo Carneiro, Alagoinhas
Attendance: 0
Referee: Edvalter Marinho dos Santos

Atlético de Alagoinhas qualified for the finals.

=== Finals ===
Team 1	Agg.	Team 2	1st leg	2nd leg
Atlético de Alagoinhas	1–1 (6–7 p)	Bahia	0–0	1–1

==== Group 4 ====
5 August 2020
21:30

Atlético de Alagoinhas	0–0	Bahia
	Report

Estádio de Pituaçu, Salvador
Attendance: 0
Referee: Diego Pombo Lopez

8 August 2020
16:30

Bahia	1–1	Atlético de Alagoinhas
Danielzinho 71'	Report	Magno Alves 59'
Penalties
Élber (penalty scored); Marco Antônio (penalty missed); Clayson (penalty scored); Juninho (penalty scored); Saldanha (penalty scored); Juninho Capixaba (penalty scored); Nino Paraíba (penalty scored); Gregore (penalty scored)	7–6	(penalty missed) Magno Alves; (penalty scored) Felipinho; (penalty scored) Edson; (penalty scored) Lucas Alisson; (penalty scored) Alex Sandre; (penalty scored) Eduardo; (penalty scored) Reninha; (penalty missed) Dedeco

Estádio de Pituaçu, Salvador
Attendance: 0
Referee: Marielson Alves Silva

== General table ==
Pos	Team	Pld	W	D	L	GF	GA	GD	Pts	Qualification or relegation
1	Bahia	13	6	6	1	17	8	+9	24	Champions and 2021 Copa do Brasil
2	Atlético de Alagoinhas	13	6	4	3	16	13	+3	22	Runners-up, 2021 Copa do Brasil and 2021 Série D
3	Juazeirense	11	5	4	2	22	16	+6	19	2021 Copa do Brasil and 2021 Série D
4	Jacuipense	11	4	4	3	17	13	+4	16	
5	Vitória	9	3	4	2	13	12	+1	13	
6	Bahia de Feira	9	3	3	3	12	11	+1	12	2021 Série D
7	Vitória da Conquista	9	2	4	3	9	12	−3	10	
8	Fluminense de Feira	9	2	3	4	18	19	−1	9	
9	Doce Mel	9	1	5	3	14	18	−4	8	
10	Jacobina	9	0	1	8	3	19	−16	1	Relegation to Campeonato Baiano Série B

Source: FBF
Rules for classification: 1) Points; 2) Wins; 3) Goal difference; 4) Goals scored; 5) Head-to-head result; 6) Fewest red cards; 7) Fewest yellow cards; 8) Draw.

== Top goalscorers ==
Rank	Player	Team	Goals
1	Marcelo Nicácio	Fluminense de Feira	8
2	Deon	Bahia de Feira	5
2	Maurício Garcez	Doce Mel	5
2	Nino Guerreiro	Juazeirense	5
5	Elias	Jacuipense	4
5	Eron	Vitória	4
5	Magno Alves	Atlético de Alagoinhas	4
5	Thiaguinho	Jacuipense	4
