= Jean Drosny =

Brazilian footballer

Personal information
- Full name: Jean Carlos Cordeiro Drosny
- Date of birth: 30 January 1994 (age 32)
- Place of birth: São Bento do Sul, Brazil
- Height: 1.92 m (6 ft 4 in)
- Position: Goalkeeper

Team information
- Current team: Paysandu

Youth career
- –2014: Figueirense

Senior career*
Years	Team	Apps	(Gls)
2014–2016	Figueirense		
2015	→ Inter de Lages (loan)		
2016	→ Brasil de Farroupilha (loan)		
2017	Castanhal		
2017	Rio Branco-AC		
2017	Foz do Iguaçu		
2018	Sergipe	22	(0)
2018–2020	Confiança	28	(0)
2021	Bahia de Feira	13	(0)
2021	Jacuipense	17	(0)
2022	Ferroviário	3	(0)
2022–2023	Jacuipense	16	(0)
2023–2025	Volta Redonda	80	(0)
2024	→ Santo André (loan)	0	(0)
2026–	Paysandu	6	(0)
- * Club domestic league appearances and goals as of 9 November 2026

Jean Carlos Cordeiro Drosny (born 30 January 1994), simply known as Jean Drosny, is a Brazilian professional footballer who plays as a goalkeeper for Paysandu.

== Career ==
Revealed by Figueirense FC, Jean Drosny was part of the state champion squads in 2014 and 2015. After loan spells for Inter de Lages and Brasil de Farroupilha, he played in football in the northern region, for Castanhal and Rio Branco. In 2018 he was state champion with Sergipe, and was subsequently hired by rival Confiança, where he repeated the feat in 2020. After longer spells at Jacuiense and Ferroviário, he arrived at Volta Redonda FC, where he became a great highlight. He was loaned to Santo André at the beginning of 2024, but due to the team's bad campaign, he ended up returning in April.

After 80 appearances for Volta Redonda, Drosny signed with Paysandu for the 2026 season.

== Honours ==
Figueirense

- Campeonato Catarinense: 2014, 2015

Sergipe

- Campeonato Sergipano: 2018

Confiança

- Campeonato Sergipano: 2020

Volta Redonda

- Campeonato Brasileiro Série C: 2024
