= Renato Paiva =

Portuguese football manager

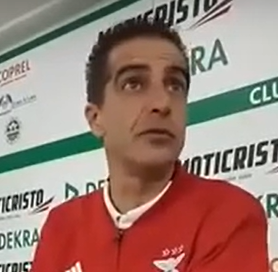
- Paiva in 2019

Personal information
- Full name: Renato Manuel Alves Paiva
- Date of birth: 22 March 1970 (age 56)
- Place of birth: Pedrógão Pequeno, Portugal

Team information
- Current team: Santos Laguna (manager)

Managerial career
- Years: Team
- 2004–2019: Benfica (youth)
- 2019–2020: Benfica B
- 2020–2022: Independiente del Valle
- 2022: León
- 2023: Bahia
- 2023–2024: Toluca
- 2025: Botafogo
- 2025: Fortaleza
- 2026–: Santos Laguna

Renato Manuel Alves Paiva (born 22 March 1970) is a Portuguese football manager, currently in charge of Mexican club Santos Laguna.

After beginning his career with Benfica's youth categories, Paiva moved to Ecuador in December 2020 to become the manager of Independiente del Valle, and won the Ecuadorian Serie A in his first year in charge. He subsequently worked in Mexico and Brazil, notably winning the Campeonato Baiano with Bahia.

== Career ==
=== Benfica ===
Born in Pedrógão Pequeno, Sertã, Castelo Branco, Paiva joined Benfica's youth setup in 2004, to be a part of the club's Development department while also working as an assistant manager of the Juvenil B squad. His first managerial experience occurred in 2006, after being named in charge of the under-14s.

Paiva subsequently continued to progress inside Benfica's structure, taking over the under-16s, under-17s and under-19s throughout the years. In January 2019, after Bruno Lage's appointment as manager of the first team, he was named manager of the reserves in the LigaPro. His first professional match in charge of the club occurred on the 16th, a 4–0 win over Académico de Viseu.

On 25 December 2020, Paiva left the Encarnados, stating a desire to "challenge for titles".

=== Independiente del Valle ===
On 25 December 2020, just hours after leaving Benfica, Paiva was announced as manager of Ecuadorian Serie A side Independiente del Valle, in the place of fellow European manager Miguel Ángel Ramírez. Despite being knocked out in the group stage of the 2021 Copa Libertadores and in the round of 32 of the 2021 Copa Sudamericana, he led the club to the Serie A title in December 2021, defeating Emelec by an aggregate score of 4–2.

=== León ===
On 25 May 2022, it was announced that Paiva would leave Independiente del Valle to take over Liga MX side León. On 28 November, he resigned.

=== Bahia ===
On 6 December 2022, Paiva was announced as the new head coach of Bahia for the 2023 season. He won the 2023 Campeonato Baiano with the club, but resigned and left the club on 6 September 2023.

=== Toluca ===
In December 2023, Paiva became the manager of Liga MX club Toluca, signing a reported two-year contract. On 4 December 2024, Toluca parted ways with Paiva following their second consecutive playoff elimination.

=== Botafogo ===
On 28 February 2025, Paiva returned to Brazil after being announced as head coach of Botafogo. On 30 June, the club relieved Paiva of his duties, shortly after their FIFA Club World Cup elimination.

=== Fortaleza ===
On 17 July 2025, Paiva was named head coach of fellow Brazilian top tier side Fortaleza, signing a contract until December 2026. On 2 September, after only one win in ten matches, he was sacked.

=== Santos Laguna ===
In May 2026, Paiva was appointed head coach of Santos Laguna in Mexico.

== Managerial statistics ==
As of 21 November 2026

Managerial record by team and tenure
Team	Nat.	From	To	Record								Ref
Team	Nat.	From	To	G	W	D	L	GF	GA	GD	Win %	Ref
Benfica B	(Portugal)	16 January 2019	25 December 2020	55	18	11	26	78	84	−6	32.73	
Independiente del Valle	(Ecuador)	25 December 2020	30 May 2022	65	33	16	16	106	69	+37	50.77	
León	(Mexico)	30 May 2022	28 November 2022	18	6	4	8	25	30	−5	33.33	
Bahia	(Brazil)	6 December 2022	6 September 2023	50	20	15	15	66	57	+9	40.00	
Toluca	(Mexico)	1 January 2024	4 December 2024	44	22	12	10	88	54	+34	50.00	
Botafogo	(Brazil)	27 February 2025	29 June 2025	23	12	3	8	29	16	+13	52.17	
Fortaleza	(Brazil)	17 July 2025	2 September 2025	10	1	3	6	8	17	−9	10.00	
Santos Laguna	(Mexico)	19 May 2026	Present	20	9	1	10	27	27	+0	45.00	
Career total				285	121	65	99	427	354	+73	42.46	—

== Honours ==
Independiente del Valle

- Ecuadorian Serie A: 2021

Bahia

- Campeonato Baiano: 2023
