= Jeferson Douglas =

Brazilian footballer

Personal information
- Full name: Jeferson Douglas dos Santos Souza
- Date of birth: 19 March 2001 (age 25)
- Place of birth: Salvador, Brazil
- Position: Midfielder

Youth career
- –2021: Bahia

Senior career*
Years	Team	Apps	(Gls)
2020–2021	Bahia	4	(1)
2022–2023	Al-Wasl	12	(2)
2023	Al Bataeh	3	(0)
2024	Dibba Al-Hisn		
- * Club domestic league appearances and goals as of 30 April 2021

Jeferson Douglas dos Santos Souza (born 19 March 2001), known as Jeferson Douglas, is a Brazilian professional footballer who plays as a midfielder.

== Career statistics ==
=== Club ===
As of 30 April 2021.

Club	Season	League			State League		Cup		Continental		Other		Total	
Club	Season	Division	Apps	Goals	Apps	Goals	Apps	Goals	Apps	Goals	Apps	Goals	Apps	Goals
Bahia	2020	Série A	0	0	3 (Note: Appearances in the Campeonato Baiano)	1	0	0	—		0	0	3	1
Bahia	2021	Série A	0	0	0	0	0	0	—		0	0	0	0
Career total			0	0	3	1	0	0	0	0	0	0	3	1

== Honours ==
Bahia

- Campeonato Baiano: 2020
