= Jonilson Veloso =

Brazilian football manager

Personal information
- Full name: Jonilson Veloso Santos
- Date of birth: 30 May 1975 (age 51)
- Place of birth: Salvador, Brazil

Team information
- Current team: Jequié (head coach)

Managerial career
- Years: Team
- 2015: Catuense U20
- 2015–2016: Jacuipense (assistant)
- 2017: Juazeirense (assistant)
- 2017: Juazeirense (interim)
- 2017: Jacuipense U17
- 2018–2021: Jacuipense
- 2021: Jacuipense
- 2022: Gama
- 2022: 1º de Maio
- 2023–2024: Jacuipense
- 2025: Ypiranga-BA
- 2025–: Jequié

Jonilson Veloso Santos (born 30 May 1975) is a Brazilian football coach, currently the head coach of Jequié.

He is the uncle of former international footballer Dante.
