= Samuel (footballer, born 2000) =

Brazilian footballer

Personal information
- Full name: Samuel Wanderlei da Silva
- Date of birth: 27 October 2000 (age 26)
- Place of birth: Duque de Caxias, Rio de Janeiro, Brazil
- Height: 1.84 m (6 ft 0 in)
- Position: Forward

Team information
- Current team: Oita Trinita
- Number: 9

Youth career
- –2020: Vitória

Senior career*
Years	Team	Apps	(Gls)
2020–2021	Vitória	35	(4)
2022–	Oita Trinita	44	(7)
- * Club domestic league appearances and goals as of 9 February 2022

Samuel Wanderlei da Silva (born 27 October 2000) is a Brazilian footballer who plays as a forward for Japanese side Oita Trinita.

== Career statistics ==
=== Club ===
As of 9 February 2022.

Club	Season	League			State League		Cup		Other		Total	
Club	Season	Division	Apps	Goals	Apps	Goals	Apps	Goals	Apps	Goals	Apps	Goals
Vitória	2020	Série B	5	1	0	0	0	0	0	0	5	1
Vitória	2021	Série B	23	2	7 (Note: Appearances in the Campeonato Baiano)	1	6 (Note: Appearances in the Copa do Brasil)	1	10 (Note: Appearances in the Copa do Nordeste)	5	22	1
Vitória	Total		28	3	7	1	6	1	10	5	51	10
Oita Trinita	2022	J2 League	0	0	–		0	0	0	0	0	0
Career total			28	3	7	1	6	1	10	5	51	10
