= Matheus Bahia =

Brazilian footballer (born 1999)

Personal information
- Full name: Matheus Bahia Santos
- Date of birth: 11 August 1999 (age 27)
- Place of birth: Salvador, Brazil
- Height: 5 ft 11 in (1.81 m)
- Position: Left back

Team information
- Current team: Internacional
- Number: 6

Youth career
- Bahia

Senior career*
| Years | Team | Apps | (Gls) |
| 2020–2026 | Bahia | 117 | (4) |
| 2024–2025 | → Ceará (loan) | 83 | (0) |
| 2026– | Internacional | 4 | (0) |
- * Club domestic league appearances and goals as of 8 April 2026

Matheus Bahia Santos (born 11 August 1999), known as Matheus Bahia, is a Brazilian professional footballer who plays as a left back for SC Internacional.

== Club career ==
Born in Salvador, Bahia, Matheus Bahia made his competitive debut for hometown club Bahia on 23 July 2020 in a Campeonato Baiano match against Atlético Alagoinhas. He came on as a 62nd minute substitute as Bahia lost 1–0. He then made his professional debut for the club in a Série A match on 11 September 2020, against Grêmio. He started and played the full match as Bahia were defeated 2–0.

== Career statistics ==
As of 13 March 2023

Appearances and goals by club, season and competition
| Club | Season | League | | | State League | | Cup | | Continental | | Other | | Total | |
| Club | Season | Division | Apps | Goals | Apps | Goals | Apps | Goals | Apps | Goals | Apps | Goals | Apps | Goals |
|---|---|---|---|---|---|---|---|---|---|---|---|---|---|---|
| Bahia | 2020 | Série A | 13 | 0 | 1 | 0 | 0 | 0 | 2 (Note: Appearance(s) in Copa Sudamericana) | 1 | 0 | 0 | 16 | 1 |
| Bahia | 2021 | Série A | 29 | 2 | 0 | 0 | 5 | 0 | 6 | 0 | 11 (Note: Appearance(s) in Copa do Nordeste) | 1 | 51 | 3 |
| Bahia | 2022 | Série B | 14 | 0 | 3 | 0 | 1 | 0 | — | | 4 | 0 | 22 | 0 |
| Bahia | 2023 | Série A | 0 | 0 | 3 | 0 | 1 | 0 | — | | 4 | 0 | 8 | 0 |
| Career total | | | 56 | 2 | 7 | 0 | 7 | 0 | 8 | 1 | 19 | 1 | 97 | 4 |

== Honours ==
Bahia

- Campeonato Baiano: 2020, 2023
- Copa do Nordeste: 2021

Ceará

- Campeonato Cearense: 2024, 2025
