= Caririaçu =

Municipality in Ceará, Brazil

Coordinates: 7°02′S 39°17′W

- Municipality
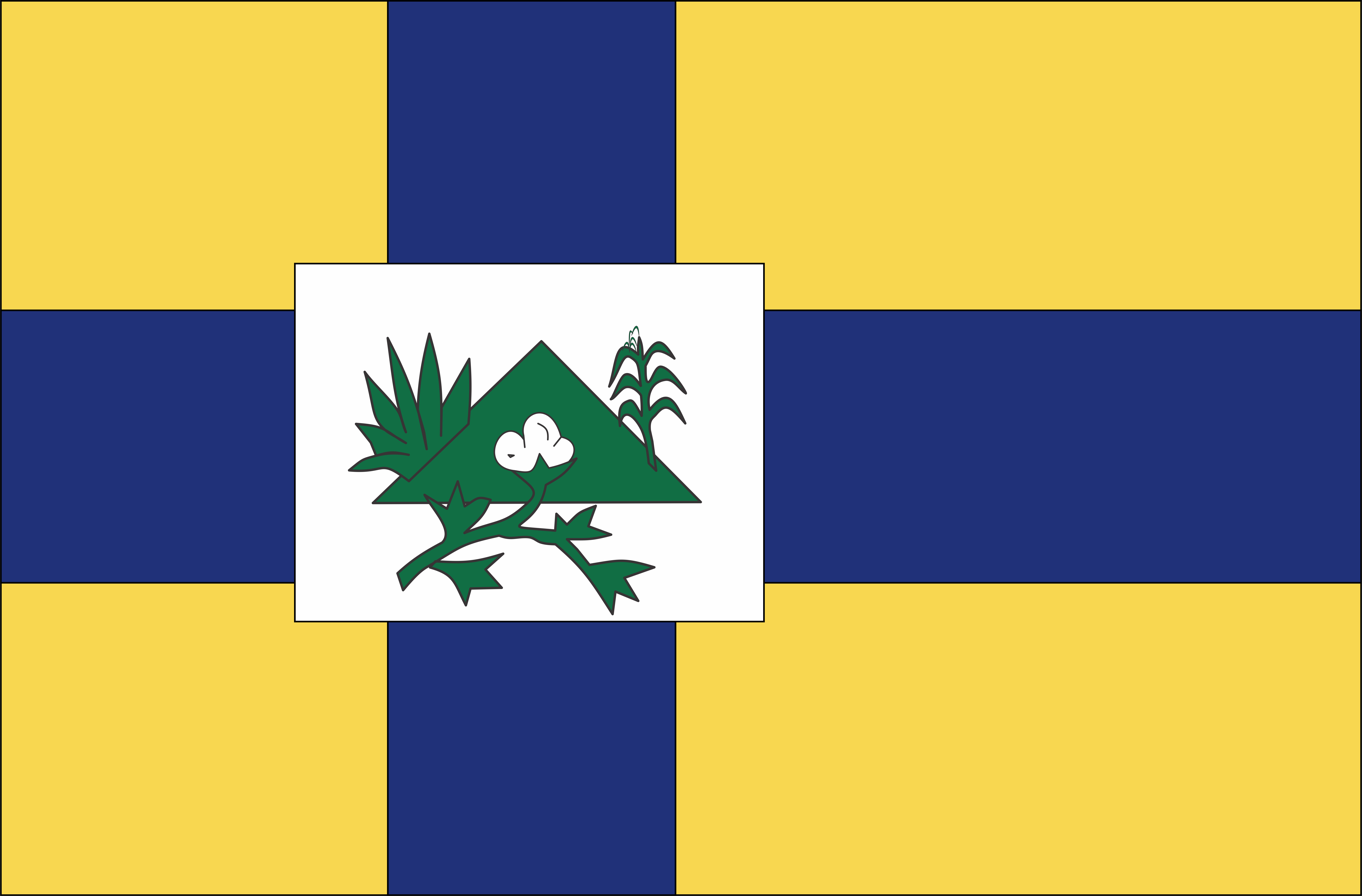
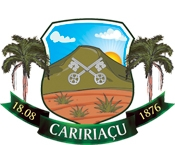
- Flag Coat of arms
- Interactive map of Caririaçu
- Country: Brazil
- Region: Nordeste
- State: Ceará
- Mesoregion: Sul Cearense

Population (2020)
  - Total: 26,987
- Time zone: UTC−3 (BRT)

Caririaçu is a municipality in the state of Ceará in the northeast region of Brazil. It is located in the Caririaçu Microregion, part of the Cariri Metropolitan Region, in the southern mesoregion of Ceará. According to the Brazilian Institute of Geography and Statistics, its estimated population for 2018 was 27,095 inhabitants.

== Etymology ==
The toponym Caririaçu comes from the Tupi Cariri or Kiriri (quiet, taciturn) and Assú or Açú or (augmentative suffix), a composition that means Caladão. Its original name was São José. In August 1876, it was elevated to the category of village with the name "Serra de São Pedro", then São Pedro do Crato (allusion to the mother city), São Pedro do Cariri, and since 1943, Caririassú and finally Caririaçu.

== History ==
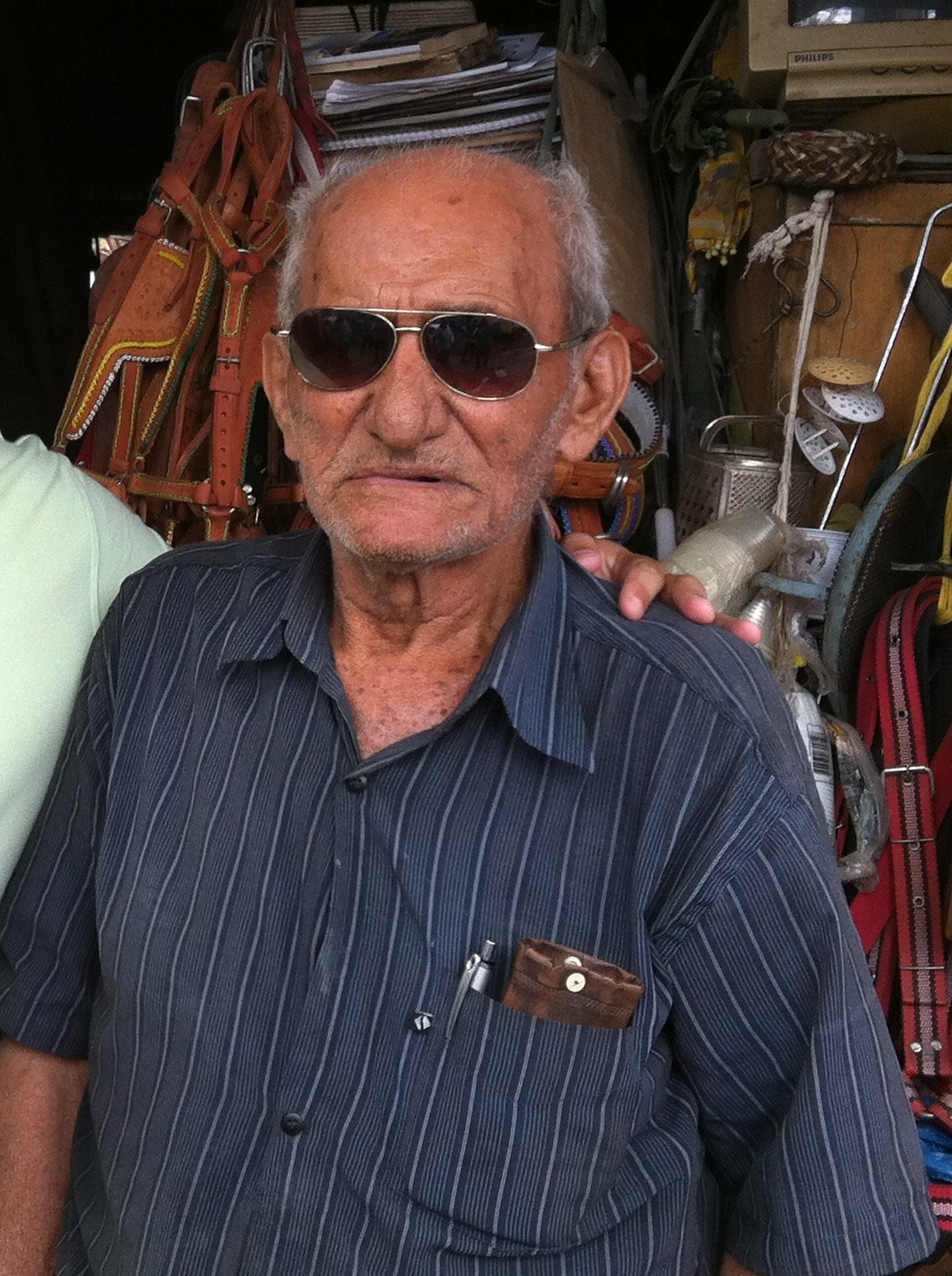
Seu Lunga.

The lands of the Serra de São Pedro were inhabited by the Kariri, Guari, Indians before the arrival of entries into the Brazilian interior during the 17th century. The members of the entrances, military and religious, maintained their first contacts with the natives, studied the entire region of the Cariai, catechized the indigenous people and grouped them into villages or missions. The results of these contacts and discoveries triggered news that the region had gold in abundance and then a real race was unleashed towards the Brazilian sertões, where families from Portugal, dreaming of the riches of unexplored lands and hoping to find the ore, which would lead them to increase their material patrimony, in addition to increasing their personal prestige with the Portuguese court.

The search for precious metal, on the banks of the Salgado River, brought colonization to the Sertão do Cariri region and, consequently, the donation of sesmarias, which allowed the emergence of villages and villages.

Around the chapels of: São Francisco, São Pedro and Nossa Senhora do Carmo, created in the 19th century, the urban nucleus that today is called Caririaçu emerged.

The first inhabitants of the mountains may have been José Joaquim de Santana or Miguel Cavalcante Campo, according to the testimony of historian Irineu Nogueira Pinheiro.

== Geography ==
=== Climate ===
Hot tropical from September to December, and relatively cooler from June to August. Semi-arid with average rainfall of 1,198 mm, concentrated from January to April. However, Caririaçu, being a mountain town, has a colder climate compared to other cities in the Cariri Metropolitan Region.

=== Hydrography and Water Resources ===
The main sources of water are part of the Salgado River basin, being the streams: Damião, do Jenipapeiro, do Jupari, dos Carneiros, Munlugu, Oitícica, Rosário, Samambaia, São Lourenço and many others. There are also several small reservoirs, the largest being the Manoel Balbino reservoir. Currently, the municipal seat is supplied with water from the Manoel Balbino Dam (sheep).

=== Relief and Soils ===
The main elevations are: Located on the north side of Chapada do Araripe, it has two main types of soil: latosol and sedimentary. The main elevations are the mountains: São Pedro, Boqueirão and Verde.

The sedimentary basin is characterized by forming aquifers; there are several sources of water scattered throughout the area of the plateau.

=== Vegetation ===
The vegetation is quite diversified, presenting domains of caatinga and cerrado.

== Subdivision ==
The municipality is divided into six districts: Caririaçu (headquarters), where the municipal administration is also located, Feitosa (Serrote), Valencia, Miragem, Primavera (São Lourenço) and Cachoeirinha.

The main neighborhoods of the city are: Pernambuquinho, Mestre Neco, Abílio Unias, Paraíso, José Agostinho, Centro, Nossa Senhora de Carmo, Bico de Arara, Palestina, Cedron, Umari and Padre Cícero.

== Economy ==
The basis of the local economy is the agriculture of sisal, tree and herbaceous cotton, bananas, sugar cane, corn and beans; livestock: cattle, swine and poultry; and a perfume, soap and candle industry.

The municipality of Caririaçu was also the largest producer of sisal (agavi) in the state of Ceará, with 90% of the state's production.

== Health ==
The average infant mortality rate in the municipality is 16.9 per 1,000 live births. Hospitalizations due to diarrhea are 0.8 per 1,000 inhabitants. Compared with all the municipalities in the state, it ranks 51 out of 184 and 110 out of 184, respectively. When compared to municipalities across Brazil, these positions are 1675 out of 5570 and 2710 out of 5570, respectively. Urgency and Emergency services are provided at the Hospital and Maternity Hospital Geraldo Lacerda Botelho.

== Education ==
Currently, the municipality of Caririaçu has three state schools, they are:

- E.E.M Plácido Aderaldo Castelo;
- E.E.F.M São Pedro.
- E.E.E.P Paulo Barbosa Leite

The municipality also has several municipal schools and day care centers in the headquarters, districts and rural areas. The municipal schools and day care centers at the headquarters are:

- E.E.F Julita Farias;
- E.I.F Frei Damião
- E.I.E.F Arara Azul;
- E.E.F Paulo Barbosa Leite;
- E.I.E.F Maria Floscoelli Machado Lacerda;
- E.I.E.F Raimundo Bezerra Lima;
- E.E.I Emília Militão;
- E.E.I Nossa Senhora do Carmo.
- E.E.I.Padre Augusto.
- E.E.I.Raimundo Gonçalo de Aquino.
- E.E.F.Raimundo Gomes

The private schools in the municipality are:

- Educandário Alegria de Saber;
- E.I.E.F Menino Jesus;
- E.I.E.F Vieira Rafael.

== Culture ==
The main cultural events are:

Feast of the Patron São Pedro (20th to 29 June)

Political Emancipation Feast (August 18)

Cavalcade (August 19)

== See also ==
- List of municipalities in Ceará
