= João Leonardo (footballer, born 1994) =

Brazilian footballer (born 1994)

Personal information
- Full name: João Leonardo Risuenho do Rosário
- Date of birth: 29 April 1994 (age 32)
- Place of birth: Bragança-Pará, Brazil
- Height: 1.92 m (6 ft 4 in)
- Position: Forward

Team information
- Current team: Suzhou Dongwu

Senior career*
Years	Team	Apps	(Gls)
2015–2016	Bahia	6	(1)
2015	→ Caldense (loan)	6	(4)
2016	→ Santa Rita (loan)	6	(3)
2016–2017	Alcanenense	6	(3)
2017	Dila Gori	4	(2)
2017–2018	Bragantino PA	14	(8)
2018	Independente Tucuruí	6	(3)
2019	Paysandu	0	(0)
2019	Bragantino PA	6	(4)
2020	Castanhal	8	(4)
2020	Jataiense	5	(2)
2021	Treze	15	(5)
2021–2022	Metapán	11	(0)
2022	CA Juventus	7	(1)
2022	Pérolas Negras	11	(1)
2022	Shijiazhuang Gongfu	16	(8)
2023	Gyeongju KHNP	11	(3)
2024	Audax Rio	1	(0)
2024	Jataiense	5	(0)
2024–	Suzhou Dongwu	9	(2)
- * Club domestic league appearances and goals as of 07:00, 3 March 2024 (UTC)

João Leonardo Risuenho do Rosário (born 29 April 1994), commonly known as João Leonardo, is a Brazilian professional footballer who plays as a forward for China League One club Suzhou Dongwu He represented Bahia in 2015 Campeonato Brasileiro Série B.

== Career ==
On 16 August 2022, João Leonardo joined China League One club Shijiazhuang Gongfu.

On 1 March 2024, João Leonardo returned to China and signed a with China League One club Suzhou Dongwu.

== Career statistics ==
As of match played 28 February 2021

Appearances and goals by club, season and competition
Club	Season	League			National Cup		League Cup		Continental		State League		Total	
Club	Season	Division	Apps	Goals	Apps	Goals	Apps	Goals	Apps	Goals	Apps	Goals	Apps	Goals
Bahia	2015	Série B	6	1	1	0	—		0	0	0	0	7	1
Bahia	2016	Série B	0	0	0	0	—		0	0	0	0	0	0
Bahia	Total		6	1	0	0	—		0	0	0	0	7	1
Caldense (loan)	2015	Campeonato Mineiro	—		0	0	—		—		5	1	5	1
Santa Rita (loan)	2016	Campeonato Alagoano	—		0	0	—		—		7	0	7	0
AC Alcanenense	2016–17	Campeonato de Portugal	6	1	2	0	—		—		—		8	1
Dila Gori	2017	Erovnuli Liga	4	0	0	0	—		—		—		4	0
Bragantino-PA	2017	Campeonato Paraense Second Division	—		—		—		—		5	2	5	2
Bragantino-PA	2018	Campeonato Paraense Second Division	—		—		—		—		9	0	9	0
Bragantino-PA	Total		—		—		—		—		14	2	14	2
Paysandu	2019	Campeonato Paraense	—		—		—		—		0	0	0	0
Bragantino-PA	2019	Série D	6	0	—		—		—		—		6	0
Castanhal	2020	Campeonato Paraense	—		—		—		—		8	4	8	4
Jataiense	2020	Campeonato Goiano Second Division	—		—		—		—		5	2	5	2
Treze	2021	Série D	0	0	0	0	1 (Note: Appearances in 2021 Copa do Nordeste)	1	—		0	0	1	0
Career total			22	2	2	0	1	1	0	0	39	9	64	12
