= Baixa Grande =

Municipality of Bahia, Brazil

Coordinates: 11°57′36″S 40°10′04″W

Baixa Grande Baixagrandense
- Municipality
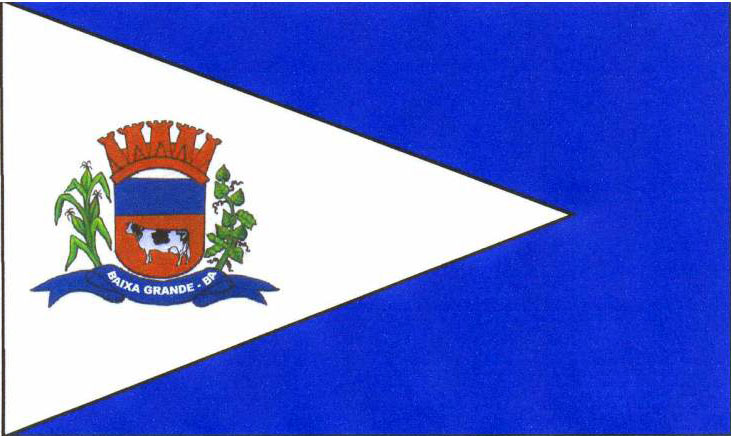
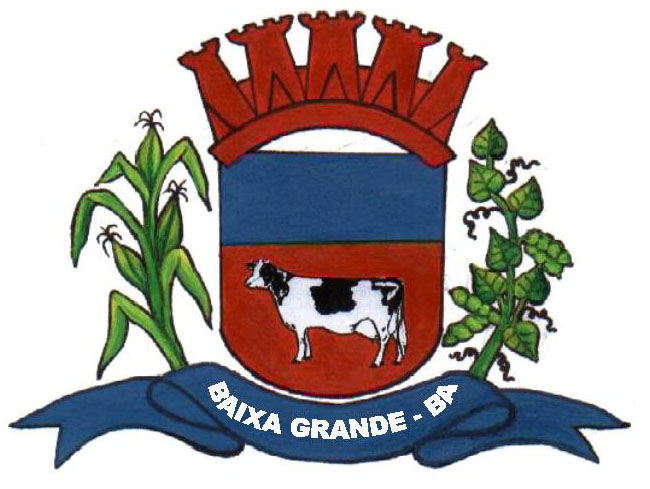
- Flag Coat of arms
- Interactive map of Baixa Grande
- Country: Brazil
- Region: Nordeste
- State: Bahia

Population (2020)
  - Total: 20,449
- Time zone: UTC−3 (BRT)
- Postal code: 44620-000
- Area code: (74)
- Website: www.acontecenabahia.com.br

Baixa Grande is a municipality in the state of Bahia in the North-East region of Brazil.

== See also ==
- List of municipalities in Bahia
