= 2021 Copa do Nordeste =

Tournament details
- Country: Brazil
- Dates: 27 February – 8 May
- Teams: 16

Final positions
- Champions: Bahia
- Runners-up: Ceará
- 2022 Copa do Brasil: Bahia

Tournament statistics
- Matches played: 72
- Goals scored: 153 (2.13 per match)
- Top goal scorer: Gilberto (8 goals)

Awards
- Best player: Gilberto

The 2021 Copa do Nordeste was the 18th edition of the main football tournament featuring teams from the Brazilian Northeast Region. The competition featured 16 clubs, with Bahia, Ceará and Pernambuco having two seeds each, and Rio Grande do Norte, Sergipe, Alagoas, Paraíba, Maranhão and Piauí with one seed each. Four teams were decided by a qualifying tournament (Pré-Copa do Nordeste). The Copa do Nordeste began on 27 February and ended on 8 May.

Tied on aggregate 2–2, Bahia defeated the defending champions Ceará on penalties in the finals to win their fourth title. As champions, Bahia qualified for the third round of the 2022 Copa do Brasil.

== Format ==
In this season, 12 teams (9 state league champions and best placed teams in the 2020 CBF ranking from Bahia, Ceará and Pernambuco) gained direct entries into the group stage while the other four berths were decided by the Pré-Copa do Nordeste.

For the group stage, the 16 teams were drawn into two groups. Each team played once against the eight clubs from the other group. Top four teams qualified for the final stages. Quarter-finals and semi-finals were played on a single-leg basis and finals were played on a home-and-away two-legged basis.

== Teams ==
=== 2021 Pré-Copa do Nordeste ===
The 2021 Pré-Copa do Nordeste was the qualifying tournament of 2021 Copa do Nordeste. It was played from 16 December 2020 to 2 February 2021. Eight teams competed to decide four places in the Copa do Nordeste. Teams from Alagoas, Maranhão, Paraíba, Pernambuco, Piauí, Rio Grande do Norte and Sergipe qualified as best placed teams in the 2020 CBF ranking not already qualified, while the team from Bahia qualified through the 2020 Campeonato Baiano (best placed team not already qualified, runners-up Atlético de Alagoinhas).

==== Draw ====
The draw was held on 4 November 2020, 10:00, at the CBF headquarters in Rio de Janeiro. Teams were seeded by their 2020 CBF ranking (shown in parentheses). The eight teams were drawn into four ties, with the Pot A teams hosting the second leg.

2021 Pré-Copa do Nordeste draw
Pot A	Pot B
(Alagoas) CSA (30); (Pernambuco) Santa Cruz (34); (Paraíba) Botafogo-PB (47); (Rio Grande do Norte) Globo (59)	(Maranhão) Moto Club (65); (Piauí) Altos^{[1]} (71); (Sergipe) Itabaiana (72); (Bahia) Atlético de Alagoinhas (no rank)

^{1} The identity of Piauí team was not known at the time of the draw.

Each tie was played on a home-and-away two-legged basis. If tied on aggregate, extra time would not be played and a penalty shoot-out would be used to determine the winner. The away goals rule would not be used (Regulations Pré-Copa do Nordeste Article 10).

==== Matches ====
Team 1	Agg.	Team 2	1st leg	2nd leg
Itabaiana (Sergipe)	2–4	(Pernambuco) Santa Cruz	2–2	0–2
Moto Club (Maranhão)	0–2	(Alagoas) CSA	0–0	0–2
Atlético de Alagoinhas (Bahia)	1–4	(Paraíba) Botafogo-PB	1–1	0–3
Altos (Piauí)	2–1	(Rio Grande do Norte) Globo	2–0	0–1

Santa Cruz, CSA, Botafogo-PB and Altos qualified for 2021 Copa do Nordeste.

=== Qualified teams ===
Association	Team	Qualification method
(Alagoas) Alagoas; 1 + 1 berths	CRB	2020 Campeonato Alagoano champions
(Alagoas) Alagoas; 1 + 1 berths	CSA	2021 Pré-Copa do Nordeste
(Bahia) Bahia; 2 berths	Bahia	2020 Campeonato Baiano champions
(Bahia) Bahia; 2 berths	Vitória	best placed team in the 2020 CBF ranking not already qualified
(Ceará) Ceará; 2 berths	Fortaleza	2020 Campeonato Cearense champions
(Ceará) Ceará; 2 berths	Ceará	best placed team in the 2020 CBF ranking not already qualified
(Maranhão) Maranhão; 1 berth	Sampaio Corrêa	2020 Campeonato Maranhense champions
(Paraíba) Paraíba; 1 + 1 berths	Treze	2020 Campeonato Paraibano champions
(Paraíba) Paraíba; 1 + 1 berths	Botafogo-PB	2021 Pré-Copa do Nordeste
(Pernambuco) Pernambuco; 2 +1 berths	Salgueiro	2020 Campeonato Pernambucano champions
(Pernambuco) Pernambuco; 2 +1 berths	Sport	best placed team in the 2020 CBF ranking not already qualified
(Pernambuco) Pernambuco; 2 +1 berths	Santa Cruz	2021 Pré-Copa do Nordeste
(Piauí) Piauí; 1 + 1 berths	4 de Julho	2020 Campeonato Piauiense champions
(Piauí) Piauí; 1 + 1 berths	Altos	2021 Pré-Copa do Nordeste
(Rio Grande do Norte) Rio Grande do Norte; 1 berth	ABC	2020 Campeonato Potiguar champions
(Sergipe) Sergipe; 1 berth	Confiança	2020 Campeonato Sergipano champions

== Schedule ==
The schedule of the competition was as follows.

Stage	First leg	Second leg
Group Stage	Round 1: 27 February–3 March	
Group Stage	Round 2: 6–7 March	
Group Stage	Round 3: 11–17 March	
Group Stage	Round 4: 20–21 March	
Group Stage	Round 5: 23 March–7 April	
Group Stage	Round 6: 27 March–1 April	
Group Stage	Round 7: 3–5 April	
Group Stage	Round 8: 10 April	
Quarter-finals	17–18 April	
Semi-finals	24 April	
Finals	1 May	8 May

== Draw ==
The draw for the group stage was held on 4 February 2021, 12:00, at the CBF headquarters in Rio de Janeiro. The 16 teams were drawn into two groups of eight containing two teams from each of the four pots with the restriction that teams from the same federation (except Salgueiro) could not be drawn into the same group. Teams were seeded by their 2020 CBF ranking (shown in parentheses).

Group stage draw
Pot 1	Pot 2	Pot 3	Pot 4
Bahia (10); (Pernambuco) Sport (16); (Bahia) Vitória (17); Ceará (19)	(Ceará) Fortaleza (23); (Alagoas) CSA (30); (Alagoas) CRB (32); (Pernambuco) Santa Cruz (34)	(Maranhão) Sampaio Corrêa (35); (Rio Grande do Norte) ABC (45); (Paraíba) Botafogo-PB (47); (Sergipe) Confiança (52)	(Pernambuco) Salgueiro (57); (Piauí) Altos (71); (Paraíba) Treze (73); (Piauí) 4 de Julho (176)

== Group stage ==
For the group stage, the 16 teams were drawn into two groups of eight teams each. Each team played on a single round-robin tournament against the eight clubs from the other group. The top four teams of each group advanced to the quarter-finals of the knockout stages. The teams were ranked according to points (3 points for a win, 1 point for a draw, and 0 points for a loss). If tied on points, the following criteria would be used to determine the ranking: 1. Wins; 2. Goal difference; 3. Goals scored; 4. Fewest red cards; 5. Fewest yellow cards; 6. Draw in the headquarters of the Brazilian Football Confederation (Regulations Article 12).

=== Group A ===
Pos	Team	Pld	W	D	L	GF	GA	GD	Pts	Qualification
1	Ceará	8	4	4	0	14	3	+11	16	Advance to Quarter-finals
2	Bahia	8	4	1	3	16	9	+7	13	Advance to Quarter-finals
3	(Alagoas) CRB	8	3	4	1	10	6	+4	13	Advance to Quarter-finals
4	(Maranhão) Sampaio Corrêa	8	2	5	1	8	8	0	11	Advance to Quarter-finals
5	(Paraíba) Treze	8	2	3	3	7	10	−3	9	
6	(Sergipe) Confiança	8	1	5	2	5	6	−1	8	
7	(Piauí) 4 de Julho	8	1	5	2	8	10	−2	8	
8	(Pernambuco) Santa Cruz	8	1	0	7	3	11	−8	3	

Source: CBF

=== Group B ===
Pos	Team	Pld	W	D	L	GF	GA	GD	Pts	Qualification
1	(Ceará) Fortaleza	8	5	2	1	9	4	+5	17	Advance to Quarter-finals
2	(Bahia) Vitória	8	3	4	1	10	7	+3	13	Advance to Quarter-finals
3	(Piauí) Altos	8	3	2	3	7	9	−2	11	Advance to Quarter-finals
4	(Alagoas) CSA	8	2	5	1	10	9	+1	11	Advance to Quarter-finals
5	(Rio Grande do Norte) ABC	8	2	4	2	9	9	0	10	
6	(Pernambuco) Salgueiro	8	2	2	4	7	11	−4	8	
7	(Paraíba) Botafogo-PB	8	1	5	2	5	6	−1	8	
8	(Pernambuco) Sport	8	1	3	4	6	16	−10	6	

Source: CBF

=== Results ===
Home \ Away	ABC	ALT	BOT	CSA	FOR	SAL	SPO	VIT
(Piauí) 4 de Julho		0–2			1–2	1–0		1–1
Bahia	2–1	5–0	1–1				4–0	
Ceará				2–0	0–0	3–0		3–1
(Sergipe) Confiança				2–2	0–1	0–0		0–0
(Alagoas) CRB	2–0	1–1	2–1				2–0	
(Maranhão) Sampaio Corrêa				0–0	0–2	3–2		1–1
(Pernambuco) Santa Cruz	0–1		0–1	1–2			1–2	
(Paraíba) Treze	0–2	1–0	1–0				2–2	

Home \ Away	4DE	BAH	CEA	CON	CRB	SAM	SAN	TRE
(Rio Grande do Norte) ABC	2–2		1–1	1–1		1–1		
(Piauí) Altos			0–0	2–1		0–1	2–0	
(Paraíba) Botafogo-PB	0–0		1–1	0–0		1–1		
(Alagoas) CSA	2–2	2–0			1–1			1–1
(Ceará) Fortaleza		2–1			1–0		0–1	1–1
(Pernambuco) Salgueiro		2–3			1–1		1–0	1–0
(Pernambuco) Sport	1–1		0–4	0–1		1–1		
(Bahia) Vitória		1–0			1–1		2–0	3–1

Source:CBF
Legend: Blue = home team win; Yellow = draw; Red = away team win.

== Final stages ==
Starting from the quarter-finals, the teams played a single-elimination tournament with the following rules:

- Quarter-finals and semi-finals were played on a single-leg basis, with the higher-seeded team hosting the leg.
  - If tied, the penalty shoot-out would be used to determine the winners (Regulations Article 10).
- Finals were played on a home-and-away two-legged basis, with the higher-seeded team hosting the second leg.
  - If tied on aggregate, the penalty shoot-out would be used to determine the winners (Regulations Article 16).
- Extra time would not be played and away goals rule would not be used in final stages.

Starting from the semi-finals, the teams were seeded according to their performance in the tournament. The teams were ranked according to overall points. If tied on overall points, the following criteria would be used to determine the ranking: 1. Overall wins; 2. Overall goal difference; 3. Overall goals scored; 4. Fewest red cards in the tournament; 5. Fewest yellow cards in the tournament; 6. Draw in the headquarters of the Brazilian Football Confederation (Regulations Article 17).

=== Bracket ===
Quarter-finals
(Ceará)	Fortaleza	2
(Alagoas)	CSA	1
(Bahia)	Bahia	4
(Alagoas)	CRB	0
(Ceará)	Ceará	3
(Maranhão)	Sampaio Corrêa	0
(Bahia)	Vitória	2
(Piauí)	Altos	1

Semi-finals
(Ceará)	Fortaleza	0 (2)
(Bahia)	Bahia (p)	0 (4)
(Ceará)	Ceará	2
(Bahia)	Vitória	0

Finals
(Bahia)	Bahia (p)	0	2	2 (4)
(Ceará)	Ceará	1	1	2 (2)

=== Quarter-finals ===
Team 1	Score	Team 2
Ceará	3–0	(Maranhão) Sampaio Corrêa
Bahia	4–0	(Alagoas) CRB
Fortaleza (Ceará)	2–1	(Alagoas) CSA
Vitória (Bahia)	2–1	(Piauí) Altos

==== Group C ====
18 April 2021
16:00

Ceará	3–0	(Maranhão) Sampaio Corrêa
Allan Godoi 72' (o.g.); Saulo Mineiro 75'; Felipe Vizeu 78'	Report

Castelão, Fortaleza
Attendance: 0
Referee: Marielson Alves Silva (Bahia)

==== Group D ====
17 April 2021
16:00

Bahia	4–0	(Alagoas) CRB
Matheus Bahia 13'; Thaciano 42'; Gilberto 57'; Rossi 69'	Report

Estádio de Pituaçu, Salvador
Attendance: 0
Referee: Antônio Dib Moraes de Sousa (Piauí)

==== Group E ====
17 April 2021
16:00

Fortaleza (Ceará)	2–1	(Alagoas) CSA
David 17'; Bruno Melo 65'	Report	Dellatorre 42' (pen.)

Castelão, Fortaleza
Attendance: 0
Referee: Leandro Bizzio Marinho (Paraíba)

==== Group F ====
17 April 2021
18:30

Vitória (Bahia)	2–1	(Piauí) Altos
Samuel 22'; Eduardo 89'	Report	Lucas Campos 26'

Barradão, Salvador
Attendance: 0
Referee: Léo Simão Holanda (Ceará)

=== Semi-finals ===
Pos	Team	Pld	W	D	L	GF	GA	GD	Pts	Host
2	Ceará	9	5	4	0	17	3	+14	19	Host
4	(Bahia) Vitória	9	4	4	1	12	8	+4	16	
1	(Ceará) Fortaleza	9	6	2	1	11	5	+6	20	Host
3	Bahia	9	5	1	3	20	9	+11	16	

Source: CBF

Team 1	Score	Team 2
Ceará	2–0	(Bahia) Vitória
Fortaleza (Ceará)	0–0 (2–4 p)	Bahia

==== Group G ====
24 April 2021
16:00

Ceará	2–0	(Bahia) Vitória
Vinícius 20'; Messias 41'	Report

Castelão, Fortaleza
Attendance: 0
Referee: Zandick Gondim Alves Júnior (Rio Grande do Norte)

==== Group H ====
24 April 2021
20:30

Fortaleza (Ceará)	0–0	Bahia
	Report
Penalties
Bruno Melo (penalty missed); Lucas Crispim (penalty scored); Éderson (penalty scored); Robson (penalty missed)	2–4	(penalty scored) Gilberto; (penalty scored) Matheus Galdezani; (penalty scored) Rodriguinho; (penalty missed) Juninho Capixaba; (penalty scored) Conti

Castelão, Fortaleza
Attendance: 0
Referee: Dênis da Silva Ribeiro Serafim (Alagoas)

=== Finals ===
Pos	Team	Pld	W	D	L	GF	GA	GD	Pts	Host
1	Ceará	10	6	4	0	19	3	+16	22	2nd leg
2	Bahia	10	5	2	3	20	9	+11	17	1st leg

Source: CBF

Team 1	Agg.	Team 2	1st leg	2nd leg
Bahia	2–2 (4–2 p)	Ceará	0–1	2–1

==== Group I ====
1 May 2021
16:00

Bahia	0–1	Ceará
	Report	Jael 90+3'

Estádio de Pituaçu, Salvador
Attendance: 0
Referee: Antônio Dib Moraes de Sousa (Piauí)

8 May 2021
16:00

Ceará	1–2	Bahia
Jael 83'	Report	Rodriguinho 63' (pen.); Gilberto 69'
Penalties
Lima (penalty scored); Jorginho (penalty missed); Marlon (penalty missed); Fernando Sobral (penalty scored)	2–4	(penalty scored) Rodriguinho; (penalty scored) Matheus Galdezani; (penalty missed) Thonny Anderson; (penalty scored) Lucas Araújo; (penalty scored) Conti

Castelão, Fortaleza
Attendance: 0
Referee: Dênis da Silva Ribeiro Serafim (Alagoas)

2021 Copa do Nordeste
Champions

Bahia
4th title

== Top goalscorers ==
Rank	Player	Team	Goals
1	(Brazil) Gilberto	Bahia	8
2	(Brazil) Dellatorre	(Alagoas) CSA	6
3	(Brazil) Samuel	(Bahia) Vitória	5
4	(Brazil) João Leonardo	(Paraíba) Treze	4
4	(Brazil) Lucão	(Alagoas) CRB	4
4	(Brazil) Saulo Mineiro	Ceará	4
4	(Brazil) Wallyson	(Rio Grande do Norte) ABC	4
8	(Brazil) Bruninho	(Sergipe) Confiança	3
8	(Brazil) Ciel	(Pernambuco) Salgueiro	3
8	(Brazil) Felipe Vizeu	Ceará	3
8	(Brazil) Jael	Ceará	3
8	(Brazil) Jefinho	(Maranhão) Sampaio Corrêa	3
8	(Brazil) Marco Túlio	(Alagoas) CSA	3
8	(Brazil) Rodriguinho	Bahia	3

Source:CBF

== 2021 Copa do Nordeste team ==
The 2021 Copa do Nordeste team was a squad consisting of the eleven most impressive players at the tournament.

Pos.	Player	Team
GK	(Brazil) Matheus Teixeira	Bahia
DF	(Brazil) Nino Paraíba	Bahia
DF	(Brazil) Messias	Ceará
DF	(Argentina) Germán Conti	Bahia
DF	(Brazil) Matheus Bahia	Bahia
MF	(Brazil) Charles	Ceará
MF	(Brazil) Patrick	Bahia
MF	(Brazil) Bruninho	(Sergipe) Confiança
MF	(Brazil) Rodriguinho	Bahia
FW	(Brazil) Gilberto ^{a}	Bahia
FW	(Brazil) Felipe Vizeu	Ceará
Head coach	(Brazil) Dado Cavalcanti	Bahia

a. Best player and Top scorer

Head coach
(Brazil) Dado Cavalcanti
