= Patrick de Lucca =

Brazilian association football player

Personal information
- Full name: Patrick de Lucca Chaves de Oliveira
- Date of birth: 2 March 2000 (age 26)
- Place of birth: São Paulo, Brazil
- Height: 1.80 m (5 ft 11 in)
- Position: Defensive midfielder

Team information
- Current team: CRB
- Number: 45

Youth career
- 2015–2020: Palmeiras
- 2020–2021: Bahia

Senior career*
| Years | Team | Apps | (Gls) |
| 2021–2022 | Bahia | 109 | (4) |
| 2023–2025 | Vasco da Gama | 10 | (0) |
| 2024 | → Ceará (loan) | 33 | (0) |
| 2025 | Cuiabá | 25 | (1) |
| 2026– | CRB | 24 | (0) |
- * Club domestic league appearances and goals as of 17 November 2026

Patrick de Lucca Chaves de Oliveira (born 2 March 2000), known as Patrick de Lucca or simply De Lucca, is a Brazilian professional footballer who plays for CRB. Mainly a defensive midfielder, he can also play as a centre back.

== Club career ==
Born in São Paulo, De Lucca started his career with Palmeiras, but announced his departure from the club in March 2020 after nearly five years in their youth setup. In August of that year, he signed for Bahia and was initially assigned to the under-20s.

After impressing in the under-20s and switching his position from central defender to defensive midfielder, Patrick made his first team – and Série A debut on 13 February 2021, starting in a 1–1 away draw against Atlético Mineiro. He was a starter in the subsequent two matches, as the club avoided relegation.

On 6 March 2021, now fully integrated to the main squad, De Lucca scored his first senior goal, netting a last-minute equalizer in a 1–1 Copa do Nordeste home draw against Botafogo da Paraíba. On the 25th, he renewed his contract until December 2022.

== Career statistics ==
As of 25 October 2021

Appearances and goals by club, season and competition
| Club | Season | League | | | State League | | Cup | | Continental | | Other | | Total | |
| Club | Season | Division | Apps | Goals | Apps | Goals | Apps | Goals | Apps | Goals | Apps | Goals | Apps | Goals |
|---|---|---|---|---|---|---|---|---|---|---|---|---|---|---|
| Bahia | 2020 | Série A | 3 | 0 | — | | 0 | 0 | — | | — | | 3 | 0 |
| Bahia | 2021 | Série A | 25 | 1 | 0 | 0 | 6 | 0 | 6 (Note: Appearance(s) in Copa Sudamericana) | 0 | 10 (Note: Appearance(s) in Copa do Nordeste) | 2 | 47 | 3 |
| Career total | | | 28 | 1 | 0 | 0 | 6 | 0 | 6 | 0 | 10 | 2 | 50 | 3 |
