= Jacobinense Esporte Clube =

Jacobinense
- Full name: Jacobinense Esporte Clube
- Nickname(s): Azulão do Sertão (Grosbeak of the hinterland)
- Founded: 4 November 2015; 9 years ago (as PFC Cajazeiras)
- Ground: José Rocha
- Capacity: 5,000
- President: Felipe Manassés
- Head coach: Paulo Foiani
- League: Campeonato Baiano Segunda Divisão
- 2024: Baiano, 10th of 10
Home colours	Away colours	colours

Jacobinense Esporte Clube, commonly known as Jacobinense, is a Brazilian football club based in Jacobina, Bahia state. The club was formerly known as Pituaçu Futebol Clube Cajazeiras.

== History ==
Founded on 4 November 2015 as Pituaçu Futebol Clube Cajazeiras in Salvador, the club played their first professional competition in the 2016 Copa Governador do Estado da Bahia. After finishing in the second position for two consecutive Campeonato Baiano Second Division editions (2017 and 2018), the club finished fourth in 2019 and did not play in the 2020 edition.

On 5 November 2021, PFC Cajazeiras' register was changed to Jacobinense Esporte Clube, as the club moved to Jacobina. After starting in the 2022 Second Division, the club finished second and achieved a first-ever promotion to the Campeonato Baiano.
