= Riachão do Jacuípe =

City of Riachão do Jacuípe
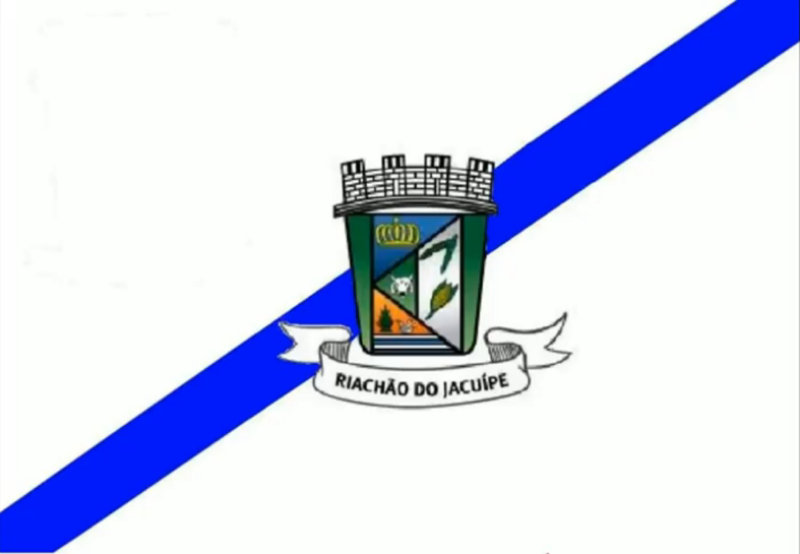
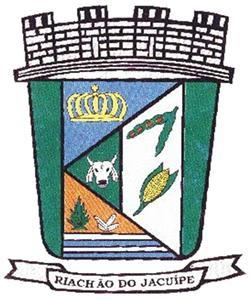
- Flag Coat of arms

- Lozalization of the city
- Coordinates: 11°48′36″S 39°22′55″W
- Country: Brazil
- Region: Northeast
- State: Bahia

Government
  - Mayor: Zé Filho (PMDB)

Area
  - Total: 1,199,201 km^{2} (463,014 sq mi)
- Elevation: 286 m (938 ft)

Population (2020)
  - Total: 33,468
  - Density: 22.7/km^{2} (59/sq mi)
- Time zone: UTC−3 (BRT)
- Website: www.riachao.com

Riachão do Jacuípe is a Brazilian municipality of Bahia state. It is a place in Sisaleira region, Microregion of Serrinha (Microrregião de Serrinha, in Portuguese).

== See also ==
- List of municipalities in Bahia
