= Esporte Clube Jacuipense =

Association football club based in Riachão do Jacuípe, Bahia, Brazil

Jacuipense
- Full name: Esporte Clube Jacuipense
- Nicknames: Leão do sisal (Sisal Lion); Leão grená (Garnet Lion)
- Founded: 21 April 1965; 61 years ago
- Ground: Valfredão
- Capacity: 5,000
- President: Gegê Magalhães
- Head coach: Jonilson Veloso
- League: Campeonato Brasileiro Série D Campeonato Baiano
- 2025: Baiano, 3rd of 10
- Website: www.ecjacuipense.com.br
Home colors	Away colors

Esporte Clube Jacuipense, commonly known as Jacuipense, is a Brazilian professional football club based in Riachão do Jacuípe, Bahia. They play in the Série D, the fourth tier of Brazilian football, as well as in the Baianão, the top flight of the Bahia state football league.

== History ==
The club was founded on 21 April 1965. Jacuipense finished in the second place in the Campeonato Baiano Second Level in 2012 and was champion of the same tournament in 1989.

== Honours ==
- Campeonato Baiano
  - Runners-up (2): 2022, 2023
- Campeonato Baiano Second Division
  - Winners (1): 1989

== Stadium ==
Esporte Clube Jacuipense play their home games at Estádio Eliel Martins, nicknamed Valfredão. The stadium has a maximum capacity of 5,000 people.
