= 2026–27 Thai League 1 =

Thai League 1
- Season: 2026–27
- Dates: 4 September 2026 – 30 May 2027
- Matches: 68
- Goals: 182 (2.68 per match)
- Top goalscorer: João Felipe (6 goals)
- Biggest home win: 6 goals total Ratchaburi 6–0 Sukhothai (9 October 2026)
- Biggest away win: 4 goals total Rayong 0–4 Lamphun Warriors (1 November 2026)
- Highest scoring: 7 goals total Sisaket United 2–5 Ratchaburi (30 October 2026)
- Longest winning run: 4 matches PT Prachuap
- Longest unbeaten run: 7 matches PT Prachuap
- Longest winless run: 9 matches Rasisalai United
- Longest losing run: 6 matches Rasisalai United
- Highest attendance: 21,898; Pattani 0–1 Buriram United (18 October 2026)
- Lowest attendance: 1,350; Rasisalai United 1–4 Ayutthaya United (25 October 2026)
- Total attendance: 368,116
- Average attendance: 5,937
- All statistics correct as of 22 November 2026.

The 2026–27 Thai League 1 will be the 10th season of Thai League 1 under its current name and the 30th season of top-flight Thai football professional league since its establishment in 1996. This league is also known as BYD Sealion 6 League I due to the sponsorship deal with BYD Auto. The season is scheduled to begin on 4 September 2026 and will conclude on 30 May 2027.

Buriram United entered the season as the five-time defending champions, having won their fifth consecutive league title and 12th overall Thai top-flight football title the previous season.

In this season, there is a change in the Thai League 1’s foreign player rules, as the ASEAN Quota is abolished.

== Overview ==
=== Promotion and relegation (pre-season) ===
16 teams will compete in the league – the thirteen teams from previous season and three teams promoted from Thai League 2.

==== Teams promoted from Thai League 2 ====
Rasisalai United and Sisaket United became the first two teams to be promoted on 18 April 2026 & 25 April 2026 after winning their respective matches. Pattani became the last team to be promoted after their win on penalties against Nongbua Pitchaya. It was 3–3 on aggregate in the promotion play-off.

Rasisalai & Pattani United secured back-to-back promotion and where promoted to the top tier for the first time in their histories while Sisaket United also secured promotion to the top tier for the first time in their history, thus all the 3 teams promoted are competing in top tier for the first time in their histories.

== Teams ==
=== Changes ===
The following teams have changed division since the 2024–25 season.

==== To Thai League 1 ====
Promoted from the Thai League 2

- Rasisalai United
- Sisaket United
- Pattani

==== From Thai League 1 ====
Relegated to the Thai League 2

- Muangthong United
- Nakhon Ratchasima
- Kanchanaburi Power

=== Teams by province ===
Number	Province	Team(s)
2	Pathum Thani	Bangkok United and BG Pathum United
2	Sisaket	Rasisalai United and Sisaket United
1	Bangkok	Port
1	Buriram	Buriram United
1	Chiang Rai	Chiangrai United
1	Chonburi	Chonburi
1	Lamphun	Lamphun Warriors
1	Pattani	Pattani
1	Phra Nakhon Si Ayutthaya	Ayutthaya United
1	Prachuap Khiri Khan	PT Prachuap
1	Ratchaburi	Ratchaburi
1	Rayong	Rayong
1	Sukhothai	Sukhothai
1	Uthai Thani	Uthai Thani

=== Stadiums and locations ===
Locations of teams in the 2026–27 Thai League 1
Locations of teams in the 2026–27 Thai League 1 from Bangkok Metropolitan Region

Team	Location	Stadium	Capacity
Ayutthaya United	Ayutthaya	Ayutthaya Province Stadium	5,000
Bangkok United	Thanyaburi	True BG Stadium	15,114
BG Pathum United	Thanyaburi	True BG Stadium	15,114
Buriram United	Buriram	Chang Arena	32,600
Chiangrai United	Ban Du	Singha Chiangrai Stadium	12,000
Chonburi	Chonburi	Chonburi Daikin Stadium	8,680
Lamphun Warriors	Lamphun	Lamphun Warriors Stadium	5,179
Pattani^{↑}	Pattani	Rainbow Stadium	12,000
Port	Khlong Toei	PAT Stadium	6,250
PT Prachuap	Prachuap Khiri Khan	Sam Ao Stadium	5,000
Rasisalai United^{↑}	Rasi Salai	Sisaket Provincial Stadium	15,000
Ratchaburi	Ratchaburi	Dragon Solar Park	10,000
Rayong	Rayong	Rayong Province Stadium	7,500
Sisaket United ^{↑}	Mueang Sisaket	Sri Nakhon Lamduan	11,200
Sukhothai	Sukhothai	Thalay Luang Stadium	8,020
Uthai Thani	Uthai Thani	Uthai Thani Province Stadium	5,500

^{↑}	Promoted from the Thai League 2

=== Personnel and kits ===
Note: Flags indicate national team as has been defined under FIFA eligibility rules. Players and coaches may hold more than one non-FIFA nationality.

Team	Manager	Captain	Kit manufacturer	Kit sponsor		
Team	Manager	Captain	Kit manufacturer	Domestic	Continental	Other kit sponsor(s)
Ayutthaya United	(Thailand national football team) Jugkrit Siriwattanasart	(Thailand national football team) Kitphom Bunsan	(England) Umbro	Chang		List: Front: Micron, IRC Tire, Muang Thai Insurance, PSD Road Solutions; Back: Anytime Fitness; Sleeves: Rojana Industrial, Supersports, Gulf; Shorts: None
Bangkok United	(Australia men's national soccer team) Danny Invincibile (caretaker)	(Brazil national football team) Everton	(Germany) Adidas	True		List: Front: CP, Stanley, Garmin, Euro Cake, 7-Eleven; Back: Daikin; Sleeves: Toyota Sure; Shorts: None
BG Pathum United	(Thailand national football team) Peerapong Pichitchotirat	(Thailand national football team) Sarach Yooyen	(United States) Nike	Leo	Singha Group	List: Front: Gomuc, Asset Wise, Euro Cake, Reparil Ice Spray; Back: Stiebel Eltron, Yanmar; Sleeves: Coca-Cola, Muang Thai Insurance, Daikin; Shorts: None
Buriram United	(Spain national football team) Raúl Caneda	(Thailand national football team) Narubadin Weerawatnodom	(Thailand) Made by club (Thailand) Ego Sport^{3}	Chang		List: Front: Yamaha, SAMART; Back: Coca-Cola; Sleeves: 7-Eleven, Muang Thai Life Assurance, True, Dunlopillo; Shorts: Toyo Tires
Chiangrai United	(Thailand national football team) Worawut Wangsawad (Thailand national football team) Miti Tiyapairat	(Thailand national football team) Sanukran Thinjom	(Thailand) 2S Sport	Singha Lemon Soda		List: Front: BG Sports, BYD Hornbill, Overbook Hospital; Back: Singha Park Chiangrai; Sleeves: Thai AirAsia, Toyota Chiangrai, Haier, Aroy-D; Shorts: None
Chonburi	(Thailand national football team) Therdsak Chaiman	(Thailand national football team) Channarong Promsrikaew	(Thailand) FBT	Chang		List: Front: Leapmotor, Panasonic, Euro Cake; Back: Daikin; Sleeves: AIA, WHA Group, Thai AirAsia; Shorts: None
Lamphun Warriors	(Germany national football team) Dennis Amato	(Thailand national football team) Akarapong Pumwisat	(Spain) Kelme	Chang		List: Front: Betagro, Jele; Back: Tanaka Precision, We Master Trade; Sleeves: Gassan Khuntan Golf Resort, Muang Thai Insurance; Shorts: None
Pattani	(Thailand national football team) Harnarong Chunhakunakorn	(Thailand national football team) Ninuruddin Nideha	(Thailand) Maisz	Ummah Pattani		List: Front: Nakee Phone, Dentsquare, CMG Engineering & Construction, Islamic Bank of Thailand, Martensite Corporation, Ibnu Affan; Back: Elrah Exclusive Thailand, UNiQUE, Yamaha; Sleeves: Subterra Construction, ISG, Regent, The View Beach Sakom, Dent Peace, BG Sports; Shorts: None
Port	(Montenegro national football team) Božidar Bandović	(Thailand national football team) Peeradol Chamrasamee	(Japan) Mizuno	Muang Thai Insurance		List: Front: Chang, Port Authority of Thailand, Thai AirAsia, Coca-Cola; Back: None; Sleeves: TQM Insurance Broker, Muang Thai Life Assurance; Shorts: None
PT Prachuap	(Thailand national football team) Sasom Pobprasert	(Thailand national football team) Jirapan Phasukihan	(Thailand) Ari	PTG Energy		List: Front: BG Sports, Chang; Back: None; Sleeves: Bendix, SSI; Shorts: None
Rasisalai United	(Thailand national football team) Surapong Kongthep	(Thailand national football team) Somyot Pongsuwan	(Thailand) Energy Sport	Muang Thai Insurance		List: Front: Leo; Back: Princ Hospital Sisaket; Sleeves: BG Sports, Nice Fitness; Shorts: None
Ratchaburi	(Thailand national football team) Worrawoot Srimaka (Thailand national football team) Somchai Maiwilai	(Thailand national football team) Jakkaphan Kaewprom	(Japan) Mizuno	Chang		List: Front: Euro Cake; Back: None; Sleeves: VAC, Master Vet; Shorts: None
Rayong	(Thailand national football team) Aktaporn Chalitaporn	(Brazil national football team) Stenio Junior	(Thailand) Ego Sport	WHA Group		List: Front: None; Back: WHA Group, VSK, IRPC, Gulf, Thai AirAsia, Origin; Sleeves: SNC, Muang Thai Insurance, M-Dear, May Flower; Shorts: None
Sisaket United	(Thailand national football team) Somchai Chuayboonchum	(Thailand national football team) Kittipong Wongma	(Thailand) Ego Sport	Chang		List: Front: Muang Thai Life Assurance, Thai Lion Air, ECHO; Back: None; Sleeves: BG Sports, Isuzu Sisaket; Shorts: None
Sukhothai	(Portugal national football team) Eduardo Almeida	(Thailand national football team) Tassanapong Muaddarak	(Thailand) Warrix	Chang		List: Front: CP; Back: None; Sleeves: Bangkok Airways, SC Group, Reparil Ice Spray, Zand Morada Pattaya; Shorts: None
Uthai Thani	(Brazil national football team) Alexandre Gama	(Thailand national football team) Wattana Playnum	(Denmark) Hummel	GRC		List: Front: Chang, G9 Gold, Princ Hospital Uthai Thani; Back: Cosmogold; Sleeves: None; Shorts: None

1. Interim.
2. Apparel made by club.
3. Apparel used on other competition.

=== Managerial changes ===
Team	Outgoing manager	Manner	Date of vacancy	Replaced by	Date of appointment
Rayong	(Thailand) Jukkapant Punpee	Signed by (Thailand) U20	6 May 2026	(Thailand) Aktaporn Chalitaporn	19 June 2026
Port	(Brazil) Alexandre Gama	Resigned	15 May 2026	(Thailand) Sarawut Treephan	16 May 2026
Rasisalai United	(Thailand) Arnon Bandasak	End of contract	16 May 2026	(Thailand) Sirisak Yodyardthai	12 July 2026
Uthai Thani	(Serbia) Miloš Joksić	End of contract	16 May 2026	(Brazil) Alexandre Gama	8 June 2026
Sukhothai	(Thailand) Ekalak Thong-am	Signed by Nakhon Si United	18 May 2026	(Thailand) Rattee Ueathanaphaisarn	6 June 2026
Chiangrai United	(Thailand) Sirisak Yodyardthai	Signed by Rasisalai United	22 May 2026	(Thailand) Worawut Wangsawad	12 July 2026
Buriram United	(England) Mark Jackson	Resigned	5 September 2026	(Brazil) Emerson (caretaker)	5 September 2026
Buriram United	(Brazil) Emerson (caretaker)	End of interim spell	8 September 2026	(Portugal) Mário Silva	8 September 2026
Port	(Thailand) Sarawut Treephan	Sacked	25 September 2026	(Montenegro) Božidar Bandović	25 September 2026
Chonburi	(Thailand) Rangsan Viwatchaichok	Sacked	13 October 2026	(Thailand) Withaya Laohakul (caretaker)	13 October 2026
BG Pathum United	(Montenegro) Vladimir Vujović	Sacked	16 October 2026	(Thailand) Peerapong Pichitchotirat	16 October 2026
Rasisalai United	(Thailand) Sirisak Yodyardthai	Resigned	17 October 2026	(Thailand) Surapong Kongthep	18 October 2026
Chonburi	(Thailand) Withaya Laohakul (caretaker)	End of interim spell	25 October 2026	(Thailand) Therdsak Chaiman	25 October 2026
Bangkok United	(Thailand) Totchtawan Sripan	Mutual Agreement	26 October 2026	(Australia) Danny Invincibile (Caretaker)	26 October 2026
Buriram United	(Portugal) Mário Silva	Resigned	30 October 2026	(Spain) Raúl Caneda	31 October 2026
Sukhothai	(Thailand) Rattee Ueathanaphaisarn	Sacked	9 November 2026	(Portugal) Eduardo Almeida	11 November 2026

== Foreign players ==
Each team can register a maximum of ten foreign players. However, only seven foreign players are allowed in the line-up for each match at any given time.

- Players named in **bold** indicates the player was registered during the mid-season transfer window.
- Former players named in italics are players that were out of squad or left the club within the season, after the pre-season transfer window, or in the mid-season transfer window, and at least had one appearance.
- Unregistered players refer to players who are not registered for the Thai League but still contracted to the team for other competitions.

Note: Flags indicate national team as has been defined under FIFA eligibility rules. Players may hold more than one non-FIFA nationality.

Club	Player 1	Player 2	Player 3	Player 4	Player 5	Player 6	Player 7	Player 8	Player 9	Player 10	Unregistered Player (s)	Former Player (s)
Ayutthaya United	(Brazil) Caíque	(Brazil) Ewerton	(Brazil) Lucas Dias	(Brazil) Willen	(Bosnia and Herzegovina) Kerim Palić	(Portugal) Diogo Brito	(Serbia) Dejan Kerkez	(Japan) Hirotaka Mita	(Japan) Yuki Kusano	(South Korea) Hwang Hyun-soo		
Bangkok United	(Brazil) Everton	(Brazil) Philipe Maia	(Brazil) Willian Popp	(Benin) Felipe Santos	(Spain) Marc Cardona	(Israel) Yonatan Cohen	(Australia) Anthony Caceres	(South Korea) Lee Ki-je	(Oman) Muhsen Al-Ghassani	(Philippines) John-Patrick Strauß		(Brazil) Arthur Moura (Brazil) Rivaldinho
BG Pathum United	(Brazil) João Magno	(Brazil) Matheus	(Brazil) Raniel	(Denmark) Lucas Andersen	(England) Ashley Coffey	(France) Anthony Belmonte	(Luxembourg) Edin Osmanović	(Serbia) Marko Nikolić	(Ukraine) Mykola Kovtalyuk	(Australia) Ryan Edwards	(Japan) Takahiro Yanagi (Uruguay) Yeferson Quintana (Bosnia and Herzegovina) Marin Jurina (Spain) Hugo Rama (Austria) Jonathan Scherzer	(Japan) Tomoyuki Doi
Buriram United	(Brazil) Caju	(Brazil) Darlan	(Brazil) Eduardo Mancha	(Brazil) Guilherme Bissoli	(Brazil) Nathan Pelae	(Brazil) Paulinho	(Germany) Stefan Schimmer	(Serbia) Goran Čaušić	(Ghana) Kingsley Schindler	(Philippines) Neil Etheridge	(Australia) Curtis Good (Montenegro) Vukan Savićević (Romania) Alexandru Tudorie (Serbia) Uroš Radaković (Spain) Marc Navarro (Spain) Toni Moya (Spain) Sebas Moyano (Spain) Lucas Ahijado (Iran) Reza Asadi	(Austria) Peter Žulj (Austria) Robert Žulj (Spain) Rubén Sánchez
Chiangrai United	(Brazil) Douglas	(Brazil) Dudu	(Brazil) Gustavo Schutz	(Brazil) Hélio	(Brazil) Robinho	(Brazil) Victor Cardozo	(Brazil) Wanderson	(Brazil) Wendell	(Cape Verde) Ricardo Gomes	(Singapore) Harhys Stewart	(South Korea) Kim Dong-kyu (South Korea) Oh Seung-jun	
Chonburi	(Brazil) Bruno Ritter	(Brazil) Dennis Murillo	(Brazil) Jorge Fellipe	(Brazil) Negueba	(Brazil) Stênio Júnior	(Brazil) Wellington Priori	(Japan) Ryoma Ito	(Japan) Tomoyuki Doi	(Philippines) Kevin Ray Mendoza	(Philippines) Kike Linares	(Ghana) Richmond Darko	
Lamphun Warriors	(Brazil) Anderson Chaves	(Brazil) Luís Felipe	(Brazil) Ralph	(Brazil) Rodrigo Maranhão	(Austria) Osarenren Okungbowa	(Croatia) Christian Ilić	(England) Charlie Clough	(Germany) Arnold Suew	(Germany) Dominik Schad	(Syria) Mohammed Osman		
Pattani	(Brazil) Carlos Neto	(Brazil) Clayton	(Brazil) Felipe Nunes	(Brazil) Igor Neves	(Brazil) Maicon Douglas	(Brazil) Marlon	(Brazil) Rodolfo Filemon	(Bulgaria) Damyan Damyanov	(France) Jean-Pierre Da Sylva	(Spain) Nacho Abeledo	(Germany) Arion Blakqori	
Port	(Brazil) Kaká Mendes	(Brazil) Lucas Tocantins	(Brazil) Marcel Scalese	(Brazil) Matheus Lins	(Brazil) Ruan Ribeiro	(Portugal) Rui Costa	(Indonesia) Asnawi Mangkualam	(Japan) Noboru Shimura	(Oman) Issam Al-Sabhi	(Philippines) Michael Falkesgaard	(Brazil) Bruno Moreira (Brazil) Jatobá	
PT Prachuap	(Brazil) Airton	(Brazil) Bernardo Vilar	(Brazil) Lucas Grossi	(Brazil) Tailson	(Brazil) Tauã	(England) Andros Townsend	(Japan) Rei Tachikawa	(Philippines) Jesper Nyholm	(South Korea) Lee Jeong-hyeop	(Spain) Édgar Méndez	(Cambodia) Nick Taylor	
Rasisalai United	(Argentina) Matias Panigazzi	(Brazil) Caio Rosa	(Brazil) Gabriel Bernard	(Brazil) Gabriel Davis	(Brazil) Gilberto Macena	(Brazil) Ramon Mesquita	(Nigeria) Nelson Orji	(São Tomé and Príncipe) Ricardo Cardoso	(Senegal) Sekou Gassama	(South Korea) Kim Ji-min	(Japan) Yuga Watanabe	
Ratchaburi	(Brazil) Gleyson	(Brazil) Rafael Bilú	(Brazil) Bruno Mendes	(Austria) Robert Žulj	(Madagascar) Njiva Rakotoharimalala	(Malaysia) Daniel Ting	(Philippines) Jesse Curran	(Spain) Jonathan Viera	(Spain) Roque Mesa	(Spain) Tana	(Algeria) Tarek Aggoun (Japan) Sai van Wermeskerken (Scotland) Scott Allardice (Spain) Pablo Insua	(France) Jordan Gele
Rayong	(Brazil) Antonio	(Brazil) Bruno Leite	(Brazil) João Afonso	(Brazil) João Felipe	(Brazil) João Vitor	(Brazil) Mayron	(Brazil) Renan Gorne	(Japan) Hiromichi Katano	(Romania) Cristian Măgerușan	(South Korea) Yeo Hong-gyu	(Bolivia) Leonardo Justiniano (Canada) Stefan Cebara	
Sisaket United	(Brazil) Anderson Nascimento	(Brazil) Deyvison Fernandes	(Brazil) Guilherme Borech	(Brazil) Jefinho	(Brazil) Patrick Valverde	(Cameroon) Alex Mermoz	(Ghana) Isaac Honny	(Japan) Hikaru Matsui	(Mali) Mahamadou Doucouré	(Netherlands) Steven van Dijk		
Sukhothai	(Brazil) Alberto Gouvea	(Brazil) Cláudio	(Brazil) Gustavo Apis	(Brazil) Jefferson Assis	(Brazil) Luan Gabriel	(Brazil) Lucas Barreto	(Brazil) Murilo Souza	(Brazil) Nathan Palafoz	(Brazil) Rhuan	(Brazil) Yan Victor		
Uthai Thani	(Brazil) Caíque	(Brazil) Julio Vitor	(Brazil) Kelvin	(Brazil) Pablo Dias	(Brazil) Robertinho	(Brazil) Willian Lira	(Colombia) Jaime Giraldo	(Japan) Itsuki Enomoto	(Malta) Trent Buhagiar	(South Korea) Jeong Tae-wook		

== League table ==
Pos	Team	Pld	W	D	L	GF	GA	GD	Pts	Qualification or relegation
1	Bangkok United	9	6	1	2	15	7	+8	19	Qualification to the 2027–28 AFC Champions League Elite League stage
2	PT Prachuap	8	6	1	1	11	4	+7	19	Qualification to the 2027–28 AFC Champions League Elite League stage
3	Port	7	5	1	1	15	8	+7	16	
4	Ayutthaya United	9	5	1	3	15	10	+5	16	
5	Buriram United	7	5	1	1	13	8	+5	16	
6	Uthai Thani	9	4	2	3	17	14	+3	14	
7	Ratchaburi	9	4	1	4	18	11	+7	13	
8	Sukhothai	9	4	1	4	15	17	−2	13	
9	BG Pathum United	8	3	3	2	12	8	+4	12	
10	Lamphun Warriors	9	3	2	4	12	15	−3	11	
11	Rayong	9	3	2	4	10	18	−8	11	
12	Sisaket United	8	3	1	4	11	15	−4	10	
13	Chiangrai United	8	2	2	4	11	10	+1	8	
14	Chonburi	9	2	1	6	9	13	−4	7	Relegation to Thai League 2
15	Pattani	9	2	1	6	9	19	−10	7	Relegation to Thai League 2
16	Rasisalai United	9	0	1	8	9	25	−16	1	Relegation to Thai League 2

Updated to match(es) played on 22 November 2026. Source: Thai League 1 2026–27
Rules for classification: 1) Points; 2) Goal difference; 3) Goals scored.

=== Positions by round ===
The table lists the positions of teams after each week of matches. In order to preserve chronological evolvements, any postponed matches are not included in the round at which they were originally scheduled, but added to the full round they were played immediately afterwards. For example, if a match is scheduled for matchday 13, but then postponed and played between days 16 and 17, it will be added to the standings for day 16.

Team ╲ Round	1	2	3	4	5	6	7	8	9	10	11	12	13	14	15	16	17	18	19	20	21	22	23	24	25	26	27	28	29	30
Port	5	1	6	5	3	1	1	1																						
Bangkok United	2	9	5	3	6	7	6	2																						
Ayutthaya United	4	3	7	8	8	6	3	3																						
PT Prachuap	13	11	4	4	2	2	4	4																						
Buriram United	3	4	1	1	1	3	5	5																						
Ratchaburi	11	10	10	6	4	4	2	6																						
BG Pathum United	8	5	8	10	10	9	10	7																						
Uthai Thani	1	8	3	2	5	5	7	8																						
Lamphun Warriors	16	16	15	15	13	12	8	9																						
Sisaket United	14	14	13	9	9	8	9	10																						
Sukhothai	15	15	12	13	11	10	11	11																						
Rayong	7	2	2	7	7	11	12	12																						
Chonburi	12	13	16	16	16	15	14	13																						
Pattani	9	7	11	12	14	14	13	14																						
Chiangrai United	6	6	9	11	12	13	15	15																						
Rasisalai United	10	12	14	14	15	16	16	16	16																					

Leader and qualification to the 2027–28 AFC Champions League Elite league stage
Qualification to the 2027–28 AFC Champions League Elite league stage
Relegation to the 2027–28 Thai League 2

Source: Thai League

=== Results by match played ===
Team ╲ Round	1	2	3	4	5	6	7	8	9	10	11	12	13	14	15	16	17	18	19	20	21	22	23	24	25	26	27	28	29	30
Ayutthaya United	W	W	L	D	L	W	W	W	L																					
Bangkok United	W	L	W	W	L	D	W	W	W																					
BG Pathum United	D	W	L	D	D	W	L	W																						
Buriram United	W	D	W	W	W	L	W																							
Chiangrai United	W	D	L	L	L	L	D	W																						
Chonburi	L	L	L	L	L	W	W	D	L																					
Lamphun Warriors	L	L	D	L	W	W	W	D	L																					
Pattani	D	W	L	L	L	L	W	L	L																					
Port	W	W	L	W	W	W	D																							
PT Prachuap	L	W	W	W	W	D	W	W																						
Rasisalai United	L	L	D	L	L	L	L	L	L																					
Ratchaburi	L	W	D	W	W	L	W	L	L																					
Rayong	W	W	D	L	D	L	L	L	W																					
Sisaket United	L	L	W	W	D	W	L	L																						
Sukhothai	L	L	W	L	W	W	L	D	W																					
Uthai Thani	W	L	W	W	D	L	L	D	W																					

Source: Thai League
W = Win; D = Draw; L = Lose

== Results ==
=== Results table ===
Home \ Away	AYU	BKU	BGP	BRU	CRU	CHO	LWR	PTN	POR	PTP	RSL	RBM	RAY	SKU	SUK	UTT
Ayutthaya United							0–2	2–1				2–1				1–2
Bangkok United	2–1		3–2						0–2					3–1		2–0
BG Pathum United	1–1				2–0						3–2		3–0			
Buriram United					1–1								3–2	2–3		
Chiangrai United						1–0	5–0					1–2		0–1		
Chonburi			1–0	0–1						1–2			2–3			1–2
Lamphun Warriors		0–2						3–1							0–0	1–4
Pattani			0–0	0–1						0–3	2–1				1–5	
Port						1–1	2–1	3–2					4–1			
PT Prachuap		0–0			2–1									2–1	1–0	
Rasisalai United	1–4	0–3					1–1		1–2							
Ratchaburi		1–0		1–2		1–2				0–1					6–0	
Rayong							0–4			1–0	1–0	1–1				1–1
Sisaket United	0–1		1–1			2–1						2–5				
Sukhothai	0–3			1–3					2–1		5–1					
Uthai Thani					2–2			1–2			4–2				1–2	

Updated to match(es) played on 22 November 2026. Source: Thai League 1 2026–27
Legend: Blue = home team win; Yellow = draw; Red = away team win.
For upcoming matches, an "a" indicates there is an article about the rivalry between the two participants.

== Season statistics ==
=== Top Goalscorers ===
As of 8 November 2026.

Rank	Player	Club	Goals
1	(Brazil) João Felipe	Rayong	6
2	(Brazil) Guilherme Bissoli	Buriram United	5
2	(Thailand) Peeradol Chamrasamee	Port	5
2	(Spain) Édgar Méndez	PT Prachuap	5
5	(Brazil) Willian Popp	Bangkok United	4
5	(Brazil) Ewerton	Ayutthaya United	4
5	(Brazil) Anderson Chaves	Lamphun Warriors	4
5	(Thailand) Teerasak Poeiphimai	Port	4
5	(Thailand) Ekanit Panya	Ratchaburi	4
5	(Thailand) Phongsakon Sangkasopha	Ratchaburi	4
5	(Brazil) Jefinho	Sisaket United	4
5	(Brazil) Nathan Palafoz	Sukhothai	4
5	(Brazil) Willian Lira	Uthai Thani	4

=== Hat-trick ===
Player	For	Against	Result	Date
(Brazil) Guilherme Bissoli	Buriram United	Sukhothai	3–1 (A)	6 September 2026
(Thailand) Phongsakon Sangkasopha^{4}	Ratchaburi	Sisaket United	5–2 (A)	30 October 2026

=== Clean sheets ===
As of 22 November 2026.

Rank	Player	Club	Clean sheets
1	(Thailand) Patiwat Khammai	Bangkok United	4
1	(Thailand) Wattanachai Srathongjan	PT Prachuap	4
3	(Thailand) Saranon Anuin	BG Pathum United	3
3	(Thailand) Nont Muangngam	Lamphun Warriors	3
5	(Philippines) Neil Etheridge	Buriram United	2
5	(Thailand) Apirak Worawong	Chiangrai United	2
5	(Thailand) Wichaya Ganthong	Rayong	2
5	(Thailand) Kampol Pathomakkakul	Ratchaburi	2
9	(Thailand) Warut Mekmusik	Ayutthaya United	1
9	(Philippines) Kevin Ray Mendoza	Chonburi	1
9	(Bulgaria) Damyan Damyanov	Pattani	1
9	(Philippines) Michael Falkesgaard	Port	1
9	(Netherlands) Steven van Dijk	Sisaket United	1
9	(Thailand) Kittipun Saensuk	Sukhothai	1

== Attendances ==
=== Overall ===
Pos	Team	Total	High	Low	Average	Change
1	Buriram United	59,600	21,203	18,012	19,867	+9.1%
2	Pattani	53,777	21,898	4,897	13,444	+111.1%^{†}
3	Sisaket United	37,499	11,029	8,100	9,375	+337.3%^{†}
4	Chiangrai United	24,233	8,435	7,378	8,078	+18.7%
5	BG Pathum United	28,366	8,501	6,162	7,092	−17.1%
6	Chonburi	27,504	8,463	5,921	6,876	+11.2%
7	Port	22,416	6,250	4,746	5,604	+12.1%
8	Ratchaburi	23,374	8,795	3,538	4,675	+3.3%
9	Rayong	16,433	6,484	2,240	4,108	+13.7%
10	PT Prachuap	14,567	4,088	3,395	3,642	+8.2%
11	Ayutthaya United	14,008	3,926	2,685	3,502	+7.5%
12	Bangkok United	13,930	4,761	2,067	3,483	+68.7%
13	Sukhothai	13,658	6,106	2,103	3,415	+1.7%
14	Uthai Thani	11,706	4,759	1,504	2,927	+16.0%
15	Rasisalai United	6,957	2,169	1,350	1,739	+4.1%^{†}
16	Lamphun Warriors	7,572	2,280	1,713	1,893	−24.6%
	League total	368,116	21,898	1,350	5,937	+14.1%

Updated to games played on 8 November 2026
Source: Thai League 1 2026–27
Notes:
^{†} Teams played previous season in Thai League 2

=== Home match played ===
As of 8 November 2026

Team \ Match played	1	2	3	4	5	6	7	8	9	10	11	12	13	14	15	Total
Ayutthaya United	2,685	3,926	3,860	3,537												14,008
Bangkok United	4,761	3,697	3,405	2,067												13,930
BG Pathum United	8,501	6,533	7,150	6,162												28,366
Buriram United	20,385	18,012	21,203													59,600
Chiangrai United	8,435	8,420	7,378													24,233
Chonburi	7,015	8,463	5,921	6,105												27,504
Lamphun Warriors	2,280	1,808	1,713	1,771												7,572
Pattani	17,300	9,682	21,898	4,897												53,777
Port	4,746	6,250	5,206	6,214												22,416
PT Prachuap	3,395	3,514	4,088	3,570												14,567
Rasisalai United	2,169	1,473	1,350	1,965												6,957
Ratchaburi	3,719	3,538	3,545	3,777	8,795											23,374
Rayong	6,484	4,236	3,473	2,240												16,433
Sisaket United	8,100	8,920	9,450	11,029												37,499
Sukhothai	6,106	2,850	2,103	2,599												13,658
Uthai Thani	4,759	3,538	1,905	1,504												11,706
League total																368,116

Source: Thai League 1 2026–27

== See also ==
- 2026–27 Thai League 2
- 2026–27 Thai League 3
- 2026 Thailand Semi-pro League
- 2027 Thailand Semi-pro League
- 2026 Thailand Amateur League
- 2026–27 Thai FA Cup
- 2026–27 Thai League Cup
- 2026 Thailand Champions Cup
