= 2025 Thai League Cup final =

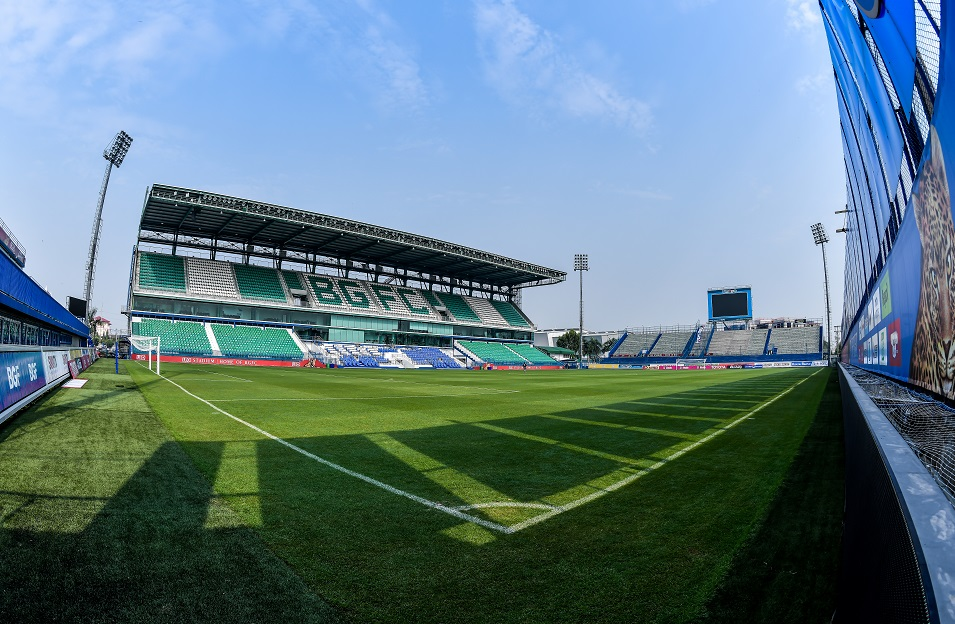
- The match took place at BG Stadium.
- Event: 2024–25 Thai League Cup
Lamphun Warriors	Buriram United
0	2
- Date: 31 May 2025
- Venue: BG Stadium, Thanyaburi, Pathum Thani
- Man of the Match: Guilherme Bissoli (Buriram United)
- Referee: Kim Woo-sung (South Korea)
- Attendance: 10,019
- Weather: Light rain 25 °C (77 °F) humidity 93%

The 2025 Thai League Cup final was the culmination of the 2024–25 Thai League Cup, the 15th season of Thailand's knockout football competition in its second era. The final was played on 31 May 2025 at BG Stadium in Pathum Thani, Thailand. It featured Lamphun Warriors, a club based in Lamphun in Northern Thailand, and Buriram United, a powerhouse from Buriram in the lower Isan. Starting from the semi-finals, the Football Association of Thailand has appointed foreign referees and assistant referees to officiate the matches, including the final, to ensure the highest standards of fairness and professionalism in critical knockout fixtures.

This final marked a historic milestone for Lamphun Warriors, who reached the competition's final for the first time in their club's history. In contrast, Buriram United, one of Thailand's most successful clubs in the modern era, made their 11th appearance in a Thai League Cup final since the competition's re-establishment in 2010. The club had previously lifted the trophy seven times, including a shared title in 2016 when the final was canceled following the passing of King Bhumibol Adulyadej, resulting in joint champions with Muangthong United.

In addition to domestic silverware, the winner of the final earned qualification for the 2025–26 ASEAN Club Championship. Both clubs represented distinct regions of Thailand and had significant supporter bases. The final was a compelling showcase of Thai football's growing stature in Southeast Asia.

== Route to the final ==
Lamphun Warriors (T1)			Round	Buriram United (T1)		
Opponent	Result		Knockout 1 leg	Opponent	Result	
Maraleina (T3)	3–1 (A)	Highlight	Round of 32	Lampang (T2)	2–1 (A)	Highlight
Muang Trang United (T3)	3–1 (a.e.t.) (A)	Highlight	Round of 16	BG Pathum United (T1)	3–1 (H)	Highlight
Port (T1)	2–0 (H)	Highlight	Quarter-finals	Bangkok United (T1)	2–1 (a.e.t.) (A)	Highlight
Ratchaburi (T1)	1–0 (a.e.t.) (N)	Highlight	Semi-finals	Nongbua Pitchaya (T1)	7–0 (N)	Highlight

Note: In all results above, the score of the finalist is given first (H: home; A: away; T1: Clubs from Thai League 1; T2: Clubs from Thai League 2; T3: Clubs from Thai League 3.

=== Lamphun Warriors ===
Lamphun Warriors began their campaign in the first round (Round of 32) with an away fixture against Maraleina, a Thai League 3 side. They advanced with a 3–1 victory, thanks to goals from Patcharapol Intanee, Tawan Khotrsupho, and Jefferson Assis, each contributing one goal. In the second round (Round of 16), Lamphun traveled south to face Muang Trang United, another Thai League 3 opponent. The match ended 1–1 in regular time, with Witthaya Moonwong scoring for Lamphun. In extra time, Fabio Teixeira da Silva and Anan Yodsangwal found the net, securing a 3–1 win and a spot in the quarter-finals. In the last eight, Lamphun hosted Port, a fellow Thai League 1 club. They produced a solid performance to earn a 2–0 victory, courtesy of goals from Negueba and Júnior Batista. The semi-final saw Lamphun Warriors take on Ratchaburi at a neutral venue. After a goalless 90 minutes, Júnior Batista once again delivered the decisive moment in extra time, sending Lamphun through to their first-ever League Cup final with a 1–0 win.

=== Buriram United ===
Buriram United's path to the final began in the first round with an away match against Lampang, a Thai League 2 side. Goals from Dion Cools and Supachai Chaided earned them a 2–1 victory. In the second round, they faced BG Pathum United, another top-flight club, at home. Buriram triumphed 3–1, with goals from Martin Boakye, Supachai Chaided, and Guilherme Bissoli, the latter converting a penalty. The quarter-final saw Buriram travel to face Bangkok United, one of their fiercest rivals in Thai League 1. The match was tied 1–1 after regulation time, with Peter Žulj scoring the equalizer. In extra time, Guilherme Bissoli struck the winner, securing a 2–1 win for the Thunder Castle. In the semi-final, Buriram delivered a commanding performance at a neutral venue against Nongbua Pitchaya, cruising to a 7–0 victory. The goals came from Ratthanakorn Maikami, Nathakorn Rattanasuwan (2), Martin Boakye (2), Seksan Ratree, and Guilherme Bissoli, sealing their place in yet another final.

== Match ==
=== Details ===
31 May 2025
18:45 UTC+7

Lamphun Warriors	0–2	Buriram United
	Report; Highlight	Guilherme Bissoli 90+8' (pen.); Dion Cools 90+14'

BG Stadium,
Thanyaburi, Pathum Thani
Attendance: 10,019
Referee: Kim Woo-sung (South Korea)

Lamphun Warriors	Buriram United

Lineups:
GK	40	(Thailand) Korraphat Nareechan	(yellow card) 66'
RB	27	(Thailand) Nuttee Noiwilai
CB	6	(Thailand) Todsapol Lated
CB	5	(Brazil) Victor Cardozo (c)	(yellow card) 90+7'
LB	30	(Thailand) Suriya Singmui		(substituted off) 79'
CM	55	(Philippines) Oskari Kekkonen
CM	8	(Thailand) Akarapong Pumwisat
AM	14	(Syria) Mohammed Osman
RF	7	(Brazil) Negueba	(yellow card) 2'	(substituted off) 84'
CF	99	(Brazil) Fabinho	(red card) 5'
LF	11	(Thailand) Anan Yodsangwal	(yellow card) 79'	(substituted off) 79'
Substitutes:
GK	20	(Thailand) Nont Muangngam
DF	2	(Thailand) Witthaya Moonwong	(yellow card) 80'	(substituted on) 79'
DF	3	(Thailand) Sarawut Inpaen
DF	4	(Philippines) Kike Linares		(substituted on) 79'
DF	21	(Thailand) Tossaporn Chuchin
DF	22	(Thailand) Noppol Kerdkeaw
DF	23	(Thailand) Witthawin Klorwuttiwat
MF	17	(Thailand) Patcharapol Intanee
MF	29	(Thailand) Tawan Khotrsupho
MF	32	(Thailand) Baworn Tapla
MF	89	(Thailand) Teerawut Churok
FW	93	(Brazil) Júnior Batista		(substituted on) 84'
Head Coach:
(Brazil) Alexandre Gama

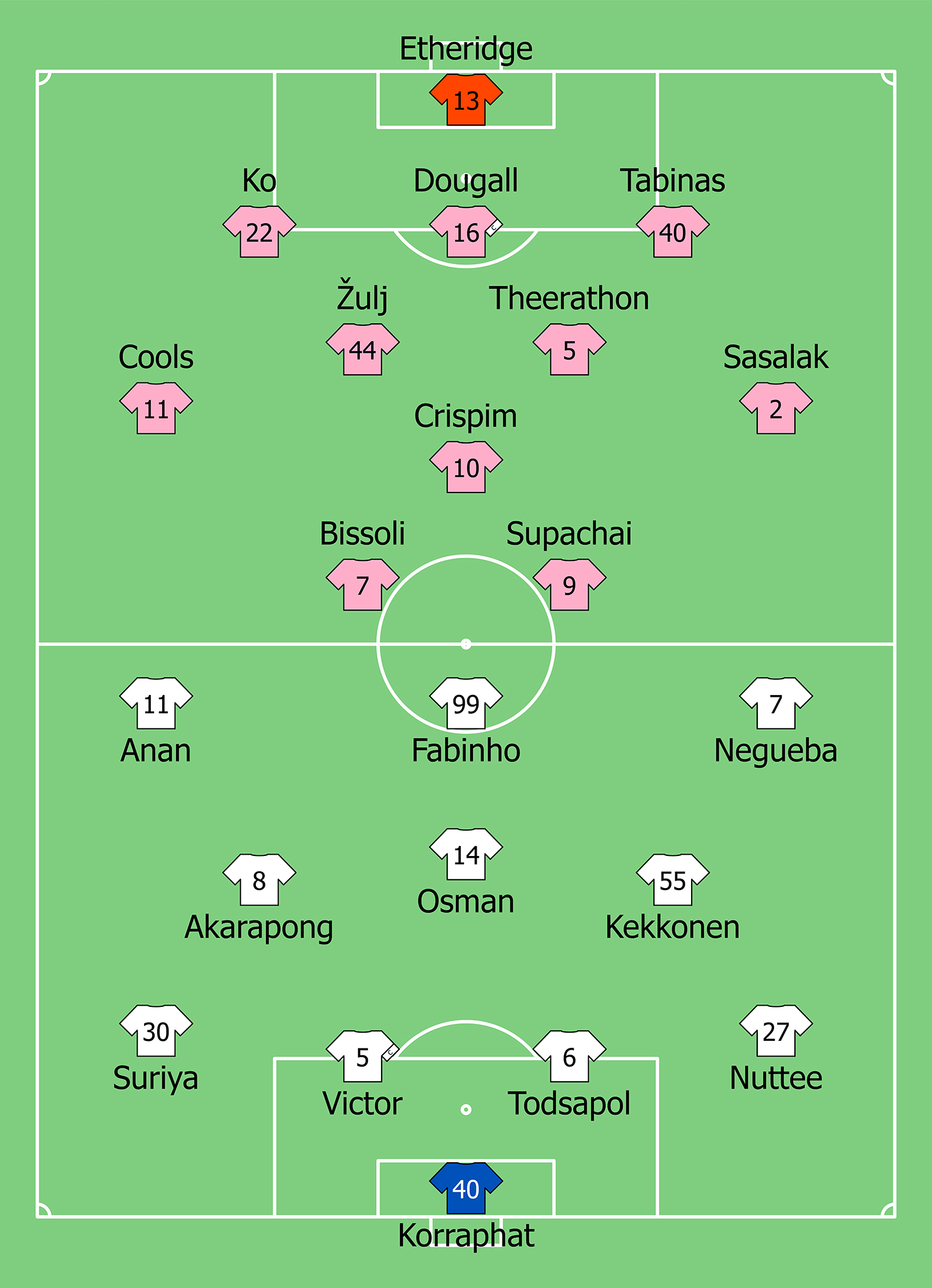

Lineups:
GK	13	(Philippines) Neil Etheridge		(yellow card) 90+5'
CB	22	(South Korea) Ko Myeong-seok
CB	16	(Thailand) Kenny Dougall (c)		(yellow card) 74'
CB	40	(Philippines) Jefferson Tabinas
RM	11	(Malaysia) Dion Cools	90+14'	(yellow card) 64'
DM	44	(Austria) Peter Žulj
DM	5	(Thailand) Theerathon Bunmathan
LM	2	(Thailand) Sasalak Haiprakhon			(substituted off) 82'
AM	10	(Brazil) Lucas Crispim			(substituted off) 69'
CF	7	(Brazil) Guilherme Bissoli	90+8' (pen.)	(yellow card) 80'	(substituted off) 90+12'
CF	9	(Thailand) Supachai Chaided
Substitutes:
GK	34	(Thailand) Chatchai Budprom
DF	6	(Australia) Curtis Good			(substituted on) 90+12'
DF	28	(Thailand) Maxx Creevey
MF	4	(Thailand) Leon James
MF	8	(Thailand) Ratthanakorn Maikami
MF	18	(Thailand) Athit Berg
MF	27	(Thailand) Phitiwat Sukjitthammakul			(substituted on) 82'
MF	88	(Thailand) Dutsadee Buranajutanon
MF	95	(Thailand) Seksan Ratree
FW	45	(Italy) Martin Boakye		(yellow card) 74'	(substituted on) 69'
FW	54	(Thailand) Nathakorn Rattanasuwan
Head Coach:
(Brazil) Osmar Loss

Assistant referees:
(South Korea) Yoon Jae-yeol
(South Korea) Park Sang-Jun
Fourth official:
(Thailand) Wiwat Jumpaoon
Assistant VAR:
(Thailand) Sivakorn Pu-udom
(Thailand) Pattarapong Kijsathit
Match Commissioner:
(Thailand) Chinnachot Anodas
Referee Assessor:
(Thailand) Adunyachart Khanthama
General Coordinator:
(Thailand) Kittipon Thongrat

MATCH RULES

- 90 minutes.
- 30 minutes extra-time if necessary.
- Penalty shoot-out if still necessary.
- Maximum of 5 substitutions.

=== Statistics ===
First half
Statistic	Lamphun Warriors	Buriram United
Goals scored	0	0
Total shots	3	4
Shots on target	0	1
Saves	1	0
Ball possession	26%	74%
Total passes	69	181
Corner kicks	1	0
Offsides	4	1
Yellow cards	1	0
Red cards	1	0

Second half
Statistic	Lamphun Warriors	Buriram United
Goals scored	0	2
Total shots	2	12
Shots on target	1	4
Saves	2	1
Ball possession	24%	76%
Total passes	61	192
Corner kicks	3	5
Offsides	1	1
Yellow cards	4	5
Red cards	0	0

Overall
Statistic	Lamphun Warriors	Buriram United
Goals scored	0	2
Total shots	5	16
Shots on target	1	5
Saves	3	1
Ball possession	25%	75%
Total passes	130	373
Corner kicks	4	5
Offsides	5	2
Yellow cards	5	5
Red cards	1	0

== Winner ==
2024–25 Thai League Cup
Winners
Buriram United
Eighth Title

=== Prizes for winner ===
- A champion trophy.
- 5,000,000 THB prize money.
- Qualification to 2025–26 ASEAN Club Championship Group stage.

=== Prizes for runners-up ===
- 1,000,000 THB prize money.

== See also ==
- 2024–25 Thai League 1
- 2024–25 Thai League 2
- 2024–25 Thai League 3
- 2024 Thai U23 League
- 2024–25 Thai FA Cup
- 2024–25 Thai League Cup
- 2024–25 Thai League 3 Cup
