= Wendell (footballer, born 2002) =

Brazilian footballer

Personal information
- Full name: Wendell Fernandes da Silva
- Date of birth: 14 December 2002 (age 23)
- Place of birth: Frei Inocêncio, Brazil
- Height: 1.78 m (5 ft 10 in)
- Position: Defensive midfielder

Team information
- Current team: Amazonas

Youth career
- Vila Nova-MG
- Rio Claro
- 2019–2021: Corinthians
- 2022: Ceará

Senior career*
Years	Team	Apps	(Gls)
2022	Ceará	1	(0)
2023	Sampaio Corrêa	0	(0)
2023	São Bento	0	(0)
2024–	Amazonas	5	(0)
- * Club domestic league appearances and goals as of 18:25, 1 March 2024 (UTC)

Wendell Fernandes da Silva (born 14 December 2002), simply known as Wendell, is a Brazilian footballer who plays as a defensive midfielder for Amazonas.

== Career ==
Born in Frei Inocêncio, Minas Gerais, Wendell began his career with hometown side EC Vila Nova, and subsequently represented Rio Claro, Corinthians and Ceará as a youth. He made his first team – and Série A – debut with the latter on 13 November 2022, coming on as a late substitute for Geovane in a 4–1 home routing of Juventude, as both sides were already relegated.

On 23 February 2023, Wendell was announced at Série B side Sampaio Corrêa. On 21 July, after featuring in just one match, he moved to São Bento.

On 1 January 2024, Wendell was announced at Amazonas.

== Career statistics ==
As of 1 March 2024

Club	Season	League			State League		Cup		Continental		Other		Total	
Club	Season	Division	Apps	Goals	Apps	Goals	Apps	Goals	Apps	Goals	Apps	Goals	Apps	Goals
Ceará	2022	Série A	1	0	—		—		—		—		1	0
Sampaio Corrêa	2023	Série B	0	0	0	0	0	0	—		1 (Note: Appearance(s) in Copa do Nordeste)	0	1	0
São Bento	2023	Paulista	—		—		—		—		2 (Note: Appearance(s) in Copa Paulista)	0	2	0
Amazonas	2024	Série B	0	0	5	0	1	0	—		—		6	0
Career total			1	0	5	0	1	0	0	0	3	0	10	0
