= João Felipe =

João Felipe may refer to:

- João Felipe Antunes, Brazilian football defender
- João Felipe Proscinski Giaccomoni, Brazilian football forward
- João Felipe Schmidt Urbano, Brazilian football midfielder
- João Felipe Silva Estevam Aguiar, Brazilian football forward
