= Jair Ventura =

Brazilian footballer

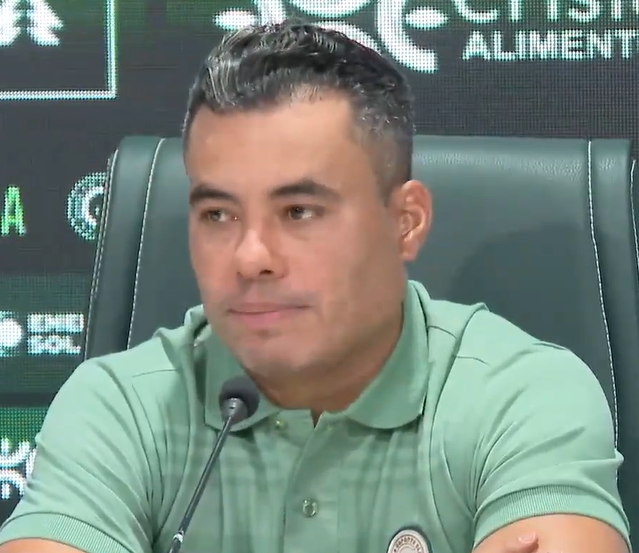
- Ventura in 2025

Personal information
- Full name: Jair Zaksauskas Ribeiro Ventura
- Date of birth: 14 March 1979 (age 47)
- Place of birth: Rio de Janeiro, Brazil
- Position: Forward

Senior career*
Years	Team	Apps	(Gls)
1999–2000	São Cristóvão		
2001	Bonsucesso		
2002	Bangu	0	(0)
2002–2003	Mulhouse		
2004	Mesquita	1	(0)
2004	Kalamata		
2005	TP Akwembe		
2005	America-RJ		
2006	Madureira		

Managerial career
- 2009–2012: Botafogo (assistant)
- 2010: Botafogo (interim)
- 2011: Brazil U17 (assistant)
- 2012–2013: Botafogo U20
- 2014: CSA (assistant)
- 2015–2016: Botafogo (assistant)
- 2015: Botafogo (interim)
- 2016–2017: Botafogo
- 2018: Santos
- 2018: Corinthians
- 2020–2021: Sport Recife
- 2021: Chapecoense
- 2021–2022: Juventude
- 2022: Goiás
- 2023–2024: Atlético Goianiense
- 2024: Juventude
- 2024–2025: Goiás
- 2025: Avaí
- 2025–2026: Vitória
- * Club domestic league appearances and goals

Jair Zaksauskas Ribeiro Ventura (born 14 March 1979), nicknamed "Jair Adventure" is a Brazilian professional football coach and former player who played as a forward.

Besides Brazil, Ventura has played in France, Greece, and Gabon.

== Playing career ==
Born in Rio de Janeiro, Ventura was a forward during his playing days, representing São Cristóvão, Bonsucesso, Bangu, Mulhouse and Mesquita, aside from teams in Greece and Gabon. He retired at the age of 26, and subsequently had spells at America-RJ and Madureira.

== Coaching career ==
=== Botafogo ===
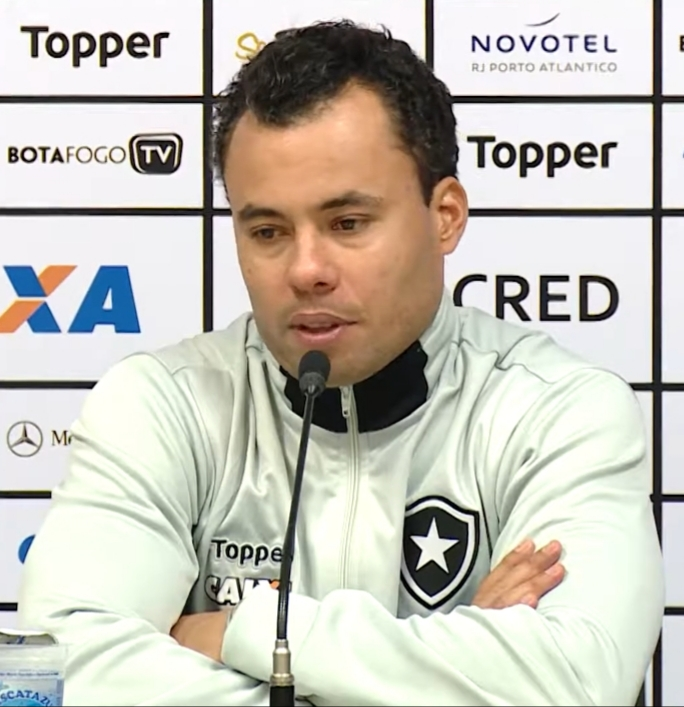
Ventura with Botafogo in 2017

Ventura joined Botafogo in 2008, also as a fitness trainer. The following year, he was appointed assistant coach by Ney Franco, and remained with the role in the following campaigns.

Ventura took over the first team as an interim on 27 January 2010, in a 2–1 Campeonato Carioca away win against Tigres do Brasil. He returned to his previous role as an assistant after the arrival of Joel Santana, and also managed the under-20 squad for two years before being dismissed by Bota in 2013.

Ventura returned to Botafogo in 2015, after a short spell at CSA. On 13 August 2016, he was definitely appointed as first team coach, replacing São Paulo-bound Ricardo Gomes.

On 19 December 2016, Ventura renewed his contract until the end of 2018, after qualifying Botafogo to the ensuing Copa Libertadores. In that tournament, he took the club to the quarterfinals, being knocked out by eventual champions Grêmio.

=== Santos ===
On 22 December 2017, Ventura announced to Botafogo's board that he accepted the offer of league rivals Santos. The following 3 January, he was officially announced by the club.

On 23 July 2018, after a 0–0 away draw against Chapecoense and with Peixe threatened with relegation, Ventura was relieved from his duties.

=== Corinthians ===
On 6 September 2018, Ventura was announced head coach of Santos' rivals Corinthians, replacing demoted Osmar Loss. He was sacked on 3 December, with the club only avoiding relegation.

=== Sport Recife ===
On 24 August 2020, after more than a year without a club, Ventura replaced Daniel Paulista at the helm of Sport Recife, still in the top tier. He managed to avoid relegation with the club, but was sacked on 5 April 2021 after being knocked out of the 2021 Copa do Brasil and 2021 Copa do Nordeste.

=== Chapecoense ===
On 31 May 2021, Ventura was named head coach of Chapecoense, replacing sacked Mozart. On 2 August, after 14 winless matches and with the club in the last place, he was himself dismissed.

=== Juventude ===
On 19 October 2021, Ventura replaced sacked Marquinhos Santos ahead of Juventude, his third Série A team in the year. He managed to avoid relegation with the club, but was sacked on 11 February 2022 after a poor start of the new season.

=== Goiás ===
On 14 April 2022, Ventura was named head coach of Goiás also in the top tier. On 13 November, after qualifying the club to the 2023 Copa Sudamericana, he left.

=== Atlético Goianiense ===
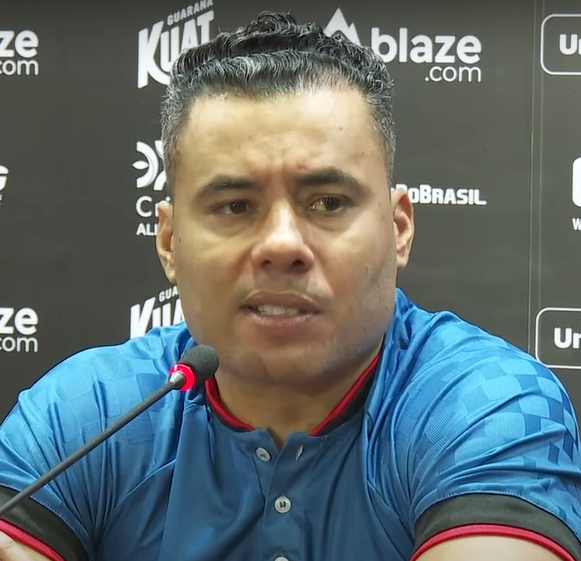
Ventura with Atlético Goianiense in 2023

On 24 July 2023, Ventura took over Atlético Goianiense in the Série B, and led the club to a promotion in the last round. He won the 2024 Campeonato Goiano, but was sacked on 21 June of that year.

=== Juventude return ===
On 17 July 2024, Ventura returned to Juventude in the place of departed Roger Machado. On 26 October, he was sacked after a five-game winless streak, dropping Juventude into the relegation zone.

=== Goiás return ===
On 23 November 2024, Ventura agreed to return to Goiás for the 2025 season. Despite qualifying the club to the 2025 Copa Verde finals, he was sacked on 25 March 2025.

=== Avaí ===
On 28 March 2025, Ventura was named head coach of Avaí also in the second division. On 23 September, he resigned from the club after receiving an offer from a Série A club.

=== Vitória ===
On 24 September 2025, Ventura was announced as head coach of Vitória in the top tier. He led the side to the 2026 Copa do Nordeste title, but was sacked on 2 November of that year, after only one win in the last seven matches.

== Personal life ==
Ventura is the son of Jairzinho, former Botafogo player and 1970 FIFA World Cup winner.

== Coaching statistics ==
As of 3 November 2026

Coaching record by team and tenure
Team	Nat	From	To	Record								Ref
Team	Nat	From	To	G	W	D	L	GF	GA	GD	Win %	Ref
Botafogo (interim)	(Brazil)	26 January 2010	27 January 2010	1	1	0	0	2	1	+1	100.00	
Botafogo (interim)	(Brazil)	17 July 2015	22 July 2015	3	1	2	0	1	0	+1	33.33	
Botafogo	(Brazil)	13 August 2016	22 December 2017	94	42	21	31	109	90	+19	44.68	
Santos	(Brazil)	3 January 2018	23 July 2018	39	14	10	15	46	40	+6	35.90	
Corinthians	(Brazil)	6 September 2018	3 December 2018	19	4	6	9	12	19	−7	21.05	
Sport Recife	(Brazil)	24 August 2020	5 April 2021	40	13	8	19	34	54	−20	32.50	
Chapecoense	(Brazil)	4 June 2021	2 August 2021	14	0	4	10	11	25	−14	0.00	
Juventude	(Brazil)	19 October 2021	11 February 2022	16	5	5	6	12	14	−2	31.25	
Goiás	(Brazil)	14 April 2022	13 November 2022	41	12	14	15	41	54	−13	29.27	
Atlético Goianiense	(Brazil)	24 July 2023	21 June 2024	50	31	7	12	95	46	+49	62.00	
Juventude	(Brazil)	17 July 2024	26 October 2024	20	5	6	9	27	36	−9	25.00	
Goiás	(Brazil)	23 November 2024	25 March 2025	19	7	8	4	24	12	+12	36.84	
Avaí	(Brazil)	28 March 2025	23 September 2025	27	9	10	8	35	30	+5	33.33	
Vitória	(Brazil)	24 September 2025	2 November 2026	69	30	12	27	82	65	+17	43.48	
Total				436	169	113	154	531	486	+45	38.76	—

== Honours ==
Atlético Goianiense

- Campeonato Goiano: 2024

Vitória

- Copa do Nordeste: 2026
