= Renê (footballer, born 2003) =

Brazilian footballer

Personal information
- Full name: Carlos Renê de Sousa Ferreira
- Date of birth: 7 October 2003 (age 23)
- Place of birth: Fortaleza, Brazil
- Height: 1.83 m (6 ft 0 in)
- Position: Forward

Team information
- Current team: Vitória
- Number: 91

Youth career
- Tirol

Senior career*
Years	Team	Apps	(Gls)
2022–2023	Tirol	7	(0)
2023–2025	São José-RS	61	(15)
2026–	Portuguesa	8	(3)
2026	→ Vitória (loan)	10	(5)
2026–	Vitória	13	(5)
- * Club domestic league appearances and goals as of 14:59, 2 June 2026 (UTC)

Carlos Renê de Sousa Ferreira (born 7 October 2003), known as Renê, is a Brazilian footballer who plays as a forward for Vitória.

== Career ==
=== Early career ===
Born in Fortaleza, Ceará, Renê began his career with local side Tirol, being a spotlight of the under-20 team in the 2022 season. In that season, he also played in the Campeonato Cearense Série B for the first team.

On 15 August 2023, Renê moved to São José-RS. Initially a backup option, he became a starter in the following year, helping the club to win the Copa FGF and also scoring the winner in the tournament's final.

=== Portuguesa ===
On 2 December 2025, Portuguesa announced the signing of Renê for the upcoming season. On 21 January, he scored a brace in a 3–2 away win over São Paulo to give Lusa their first derby win in nearly 13 years; in that match, he was also sent off, but was still chosen as man of the match.

=== Vitória ===
On 27 March 2026, Renê was loaned to Série A side Vitória until the end of the year. He made his top tier debut five days later, coming on as a half-time substitute for Renzo López in a 3–0 away loss to Cruzeiro.

After scoring three times in two Copa do Nordeste matches against Juazeirense and Piauí, Renê scored his first goal in the first division on 26 April 2026, but in a 3–1 loss at Athletico Paranaense. He subsequently established himself as a first-choice, scoring another brace in a 6–2 routing of ABC on 20 May.

On 5 June 2026, Vitória announced that Renê signed a permanent contract until December 2029, after the club activated his € 1 million buyout clause for 50% of his economic rights; Portuguesa also retained the remaining 50%.

== Career statistics ==
As of 7 June 2026

Club	Season	League			State League		Cup		Continental		Other		Total	
Club	Season	Division	Apps	Goals	Apps	Goals	Apps	Goals	Apps	Goals	Apps	Goals	Apps	Goals
Tirol	2022	Cearense Série B	—		7	0	—		—		—		7	0
São José-RS	2023	Série C	3	0	—		—		—		2 (Note: Appearance(s) in Copa FGF)	0	5	0
São José-RS	2024	Série C	17	1	12	4	—		—		12	6	41	11
São José-RS	2025	Série D	15	7	14	3	2	0	—		1 (Note: Appearance(s) in Recopa Gaúcha)	0	32	10
São José-RS	Total		35	8	26	7	2	0	—		15	6	78	21
Portuguesa	2026	Série D	0	0	8	3	3	4	—		—		11	7
Vitória	2026	Série A	10	5	—		2	0	—		7 (Note: Appearance(s) in Copa do Nordeste)	5	19	10
Career total			45	13	41	10	7	4	0	0	22	11	115	38

== Honours ==
São José-RS

- Copa FGF: 2024

Vitória

- Copa do Nordeste: 2026
