= Tossaporn Chuchin =

Thai footballer (born 1993)

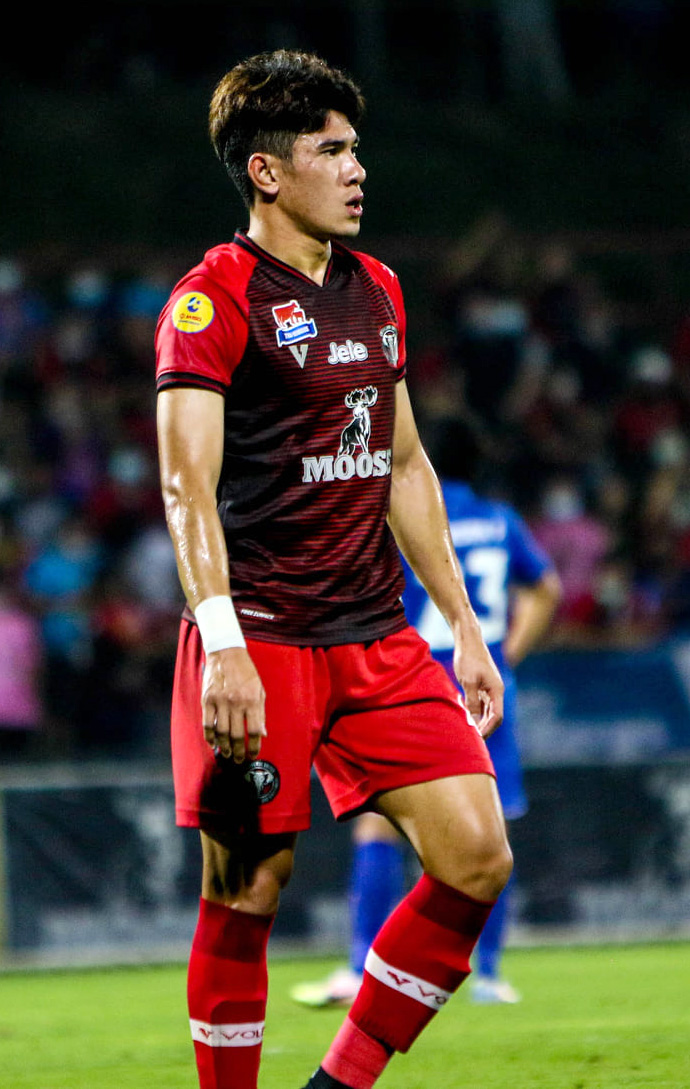

Personal information
- Full name: Tossaporn Chuchin
- Date of birth: 2 February 1993 (age 33)
- Place of birth: Bangkok, Thailand
- Height: 1.75 m (5 ft 9 in)
- Position: Right back

Team information
- Current team: Lamphun Warriors
- Number: 21

Senior career*
Years	Team	Apps	(Gls)
2012	Angthong		
2013–2015	Singhtarua		
2016	Air Force United		
2017	Super Power	21	(2)
2018	Pattaya United	1	(0)
2018	→ Phrae United (loan)		
2019–2024	Chiangmai United	60	(1)
2024–	Lamphun Warriors	30	(0)
- * Club domestic league appearances and goals as of 14 March 2025

Tossaporn Chuchin (Thai: ทศพร ชูชิน, born 2 February 1993) is a Thai professional footballer who plays for Lamphun Warriors in Thai League 1 as a right-back.
