= Lamphun Province Stadium =

Sports venue in Lamphun, Thailand

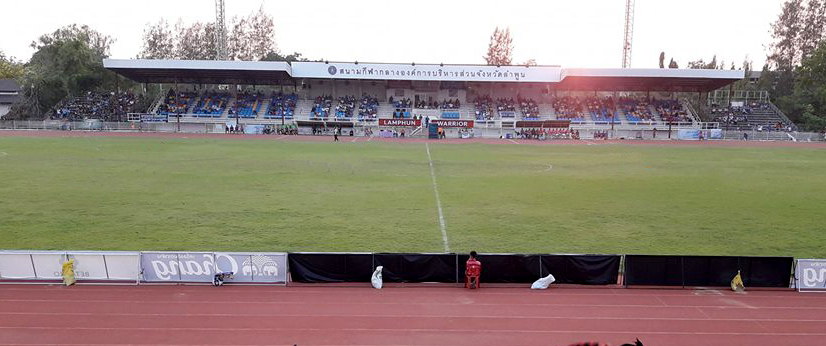
- Interactive map of Lamphun Province Stadium
- Location: Lamphun, Thailand
- Coordinates: 18°34′04″N 99°00′22″E
- Operator: Lamphun Warriors F.C.
- Capacity: 3,000
- Surface: Grass

Tenant
- Lamphun Warriors F.C. 2011

Lamphun Province Stadium or Lamphun PAO. Stadium or Mae-Guang Stadium (Thai: สนามกีฬาจังหวัดลำพูน หรือ สนามกีฬา อบจ. ลำพูน หรือ แม่กวงสเตเดี้ยม) is a multi-purpose stadium in Lamphun province, Thailand. It is currently used mostly for football matches and is the home stadium of Lamphun Warriors F.C.

== See also ==
- Lamphun Warriors Stadium
