= 2026 Copa do Nordeste =

Tournament details
- Country: Brazil
- Dates: 24 March – 6 June
- Teams: 20

Final positions
- Champions: Vitória (5th title)
- Runners-up: Fortaleza
- 2027 Copa do Brasil: Vitória

Tournament statistics
- Matches played: 60
- Goals scored: 169 (2.82 per match)

The 2026 Copa do Nordeste (officially the Copa do Nordeste Casas Bahia 2026 for sponsorship reasons) was the 23rd edition of the main football tournament featuring teams from the Brazilian Northeast Region. The competition featured 20 clubs. Bahia and Ceará had three berths each, while Alagoas, Maranhão, Paraíba, Pernambuco, Piauí, Rio Grande do Norte, and Sergipe had two each. The Copa do Nordeste began on 24 March and ended on 6 June 2026.

Due to the restructuring of Brazilian tournaments by the CBF, teams participating in the 2026 Copa Libertadores and 2026 Copa Sudamericana would not be allowed to participate in regional tournaments. Therefore, Bahia, the defending champions who qualified for the second stage of the 2026 Copa Libertadores, were excluded from the 2026 Copa do Nordeste, despite winning the 2025 Campeonato Baiano.

Vitória defeated Fortaleza 4–2 on aggregate in the finals to win their fifth title. As champions, they qualified for the 2027 Copa do Brasil.

== Format ==
In this season, 20 teams (9 state league champions and runners-up and best placed teams in the 2026 CBF ranking from Ceará and Bahia) gained entries into the group stage.

For the group stage, the 20 teams were drawn into four groups. Each team in Group A played each team in Group B once, and each team in Group C played each team in Group D once. The top two teams from each group advanced to the final stage. The quarterfinals were played on a single-leg basis, while the semifinals and finals were played on a two-legged, home-and-away basis.

== Teams ==
The qualified teams were

| Association | Team | Qualification method |
|---|---|---|
| (Alagoas) Alagoas; 2 berths | CRB | 2025 Campeonato Alagoano champions |
| (Alagoas) Alagoas; 2 berths | ASA | 2025 Campeonato Alagoano runners-up |
| (Bahia) Bahia; 3 berths | Vitória | 2025 Campeonato Baiano runners-up |
| (Bahia) Bahia; 3 berths | Jacuipense | 2025 Campeonato Baiano third place |
| (Bahia) Bahia; 3 berths | Juazeirense | best placed team in the 2026 CBF ranking not already qualified |
| (Ceará) Ceará; 3 berths | Ceará | 2025 Campeonato Cearense champions |
| (Ceará) Ceará; 3 berths | Fortaleza | 2025 Campeonato Cearense runners-up |
| (Ceará) Ceará; 3 berths | Ferroviário | best placed team in the 2026 CBF ranking not already qualified |
| (Maranhão) Maranhão; 2 berths | Maranhão | 2025 Campeonato Maranhense champions |
| (Maranhão) Maranhão; 2 berths | Imperatriz | 2025 Campeonato Maranhense runners-up |
| (Paraíba) Paraíba; 2 berths | Sousa | 2025 Campeonato Paraibano champions |
| (Paraíba) Paraíba; 2 berths | Botafogo-PB | 2025 Campeonato Paraibano runners-up |
| (Pernambuco) Pernambuco; 2 berths | Sport | 2025 Campeonato Pernambucano champions |
| (Pernambuco) Pernambuco; 2 berths | Retrô | 2025 Campeonato Pernambucano runners-up |
| (Piauí) Piauí; 2 berths | Piauí | 2025 Campeonato Piauiense champions |
| (Piauí) Piauí; 2 berths | Fluminense-PI | 2025 Campeonato Piauiense runners-up |
| (Rio Grande do Norte) Rio Grande do Norte; 2 berths | América de Natal | 2025 Campeonato Potiguar champions |
| (Rio Grande do Norte) Rio Grande do Norte; 2 berths | ABC | 2025 Campeonato Potiguar runners-up |
| (Sergipe) Sergipe; 2 berths | Confiança | 2025 Campeonato Sergipano champions |
| (Sergipe) Sergipe; 2 berths | Itabaiana | 2025 Campeonato Sergipano runners-up |

Bahia (2025 Campeonato Baiano champions) did not participate in the 2026 Copa do Nordeste due to their qualification for the second stage of the 2026 Copa Libertadores.

== Draw ==
The group stage draw was held on 3 March 2026, 14:00, at the CBF headquarters in Rio de Janeiro. Teams were seeded into five pots based on the 2026 CBF state ranking (shown in parentheses).

2026 CBF state ranking
State
- Ceará (6)
- Bahia (9)
- Pernambuco (10)
- Alagoas (11)
- Rio Grande do Norte (15)
- Paraíba (16)
- Maranhão (17)
- Sergipe (18)
- Piauí (20)

Teams from Ceará and Bahia with the worst 2026 CBF club ranking were allocated to Pot 5. All the clubs were drawn into four groups of five, with one team from each pot. There was one restriction: teams from the same federation should play each other in the group stage. For example, if a team was drawn in Group A, its rival from the same federation would be drawn in Group B. If the team was drawn in Group C, its rival would be drawn in Group D. The 2026 CBF club ranking is shown in parentheses.

Group stage draw
| Pot 1 | Pot 2 | Pot 3 | Pot 4 | Pot 5 |
|---|---|---|---|---|
| (Ceará) Fortaleza (13); Ceará (21); (Bahia) Vitória (20); (Bahia) Juazeirense (83) | (Pernambuco) Sport (25); (Pernambuco) Retrô (49); (Alagoas) CRB (26); (Alagoas) ASA (74) | (Rio Grande do Norte) ABC (46); (Rio Grande do Norte) América de Natal (62); (Paraíba) Botafogo-PB (52); (Paraíba) Sousa (70) | Maranhão (85); (Maranhão) Imperatriz (144); (Sergipe) Confiança (53); (Sergipe) Itabaiana (84) | (Piauí) Fluminense-PI (97); Piauí (no rank); (Ceará) Ferroviário (60); (Bahia) Jacuipense (94) |

== Group stage ==
In the group stage, the 20 teams were drawn into four groups of five teams each. Each team in Group A played each team in Group B once, and each team in Group C played each team in Group D once. The clubs drawn to form Groups A and C played three home games and two away games. The top two teams of each group advanced to the quarter-finals of the knockout stages. The teams were ranked according to points (3 points for a win, 1 point for a draw, and 0 points for a loss). If tied on points, the following criteria would be used to determine the ranking: 1. Wins; 2. Goal difference; 3. Goals scored; 4. Fewest red cards; 5. Fewest yellow cards; 6. Draw in the headquarters of the Brazilian Football Confederation (Regulations Article 13).

=== Group A ===
| Pos | Team | Pld | W | D | L | GF | GA | GD | Pts | Qualification |
|---|---|---|---|---|---|---|---|---|---|---|
| 1 | (Bahia) Vitória | 5 | 3 | 1 | 1 | 14 | 8 | +6 | 10 | Advance to Quarter-finals |
| 2 | (Alagoas) ASA | 5 | 2 | 3 | 0 | 7 | 4 | +3 | 9 | Advance to Quarter-finals |
| 3 | (Paraíba) Sousa | 5 | 2 | 1 | 2 | 8 | 7 | +1 | 7 | |
| 4 | (Piauí) Fluminense-PI | 5 | 1 | 3 | 1 | 4 | 4 | 0 | 6 | |
| 5 | (Sergipe) Itabaiana | 5 | 0 | 3 | 2 | 4 | 8 | −4 | 3 | |

Source: CBF

=== Group B ===
| Pos | Team | Pld | W | D | L | GF | GA | GD | Pts | Qualification |
|---|---|---|---|---|---|---|---|---|---|---|
| 1 | (Sergipe) Confiança | 5 | 2 | 2 | 1 | 7 | 7 | 0 | 8 | Advance to Quarter-finals |
| 2 | (Bahia) Juazeirense | 5 | 1 | 3 | 1 | 8 | 8 | 0 | 6 | Advance to Quarter-finals |
| 3 | (Paraíba) Botafogo-PB | 5 | 1 | 3 | 1 | 8 | 9 | −1 | 6 | |
| 4 | (Alagoas) CRB | 5 | 1 | 2 | 2 | 5 | 6 | −1 | 5 | |
| 5 | Piauí | 5 | 1 | 1 | 3 | 3 | 7 | −4 | 4 | |

Source: CBF

=== Results: Group A vs. Group B ===
| Home \ Away | BOT | CON | CRB | JUA | PIA |
|---|---|---|---|---|---|
| (Alagoas) ASA | | 1–1 | 2–0 | | 1–0 |
| (Piauí) Fluminense-PI | | | 0–0 | 1–1 | 2–0 |
| (Sergipe) Itabaiana | 3–3 | 0–1 | 0–0 | | |
| (Paraíba) Sousa | 2–0 | 4–1 | | 2–2 | |
| (Bahia) Vitória | 1–2 | | | 4–1 | 3–1 |

| Home \ Away | ASA | FLU | ITA | SOU | VIT |
|---|---|---|---|---|---|
| (Paraíba) Botafogo-PB | 2–2 | 1–1 | | | |
| (Sergipe) Confiança | | 2–0 | | | 2–2 |
| (Alagoas) CRB | | | | 3–0 | 2–4 |
| (Bahia) Juazeirense | 1–1 | | 3–0 | | |
| Piauí | | | 1–1 | 1–0 | |

Source:CBF
Legend: Blue = home team win; Yellow = draw; Red = away team win.

=== Group C ===
| Pos | Team | Pld | W | D | L | GF | GA | GD | Pts | Qualification |
|---|---|---|---|---|---|---|---|---|---|---|
| 1 | (Pernambuco) Sport | 5 | 4 | 0 | 1 | 11 | 3 | +8 | 12 | Advance to Quarter-finals |
| 2 | Ceará | 5 | 3 | 1 | 1 | 11 | 6 | +5 | 10 | Advance to Quarter-finals |
| 3 | (Ceará) Ferroviário | 5 | 2 | 1 | 2 | 6 | 8 | −2 | 7 | |
| 4 | (Rio Grande do Norte) América de Natal | 5 | 1 | 2 | 2 | 4 | 6 | −2 | 5 | |
| 5 | (Maranhão) Imperatriz | 5 | 1 | 1 | 3 | 4 | 7 | −3 | 4 | |

Source: CBF

=== Group D ===
| Pos | Team | Pld | W | D | L | GF | GA | GD | Pts | Qualification |
|---|---|---|---|---|---|---|---|---|---|---|
| 1 | (Rio Grande do Norte) ABC | 5 | 3 | 1 | 1 | 11 | 4 | +7 | 10 | Advance to Quarter-finals |
| 2 | (Ceará) Fortaleza | 5 | 3 | 1 | 1 | 6 | 4 | +2 | 10 | Advance to Quarter-finals |
| 3 | (Pernambuco) Retrô | 5 | 3 | 1 | 1 | 7 | 6 | +1 | 10 | |
| 4 | (Bahia) Jacuipense | 5 | 0 | 1 | 4 | 2 | 8 | −6 | 1 | |
| 5 | Maranhão | 5 | 0 | 1 | 4 | 4 | 14 | −10 | 1 | |

Source: CBF

=== Results: Group C vs. Group D ===
| Home \ Away | ABC | FOR | JAC | MAR | RET |
|---|---|---|---|---|---|
| (Rio Grande do Norte) América de Natal | 0–3 | 1–1 | | 2–0 | |
| Ceará | 1–1 | 2–0 | 4–1 | | |
| (Ceará) Ferroviário | | 0–1 | 1–0 | | 1–1 |
| (Maranhão) Imperatriz | 1–3 | | | 1–1 | 0–1 |
| (Pernambuco) Sport | | | 2–1 | 5–0 | 3–0 |

| Home \ Away | AME | CEA | FER | IMP | SPO |
|---|---|---|---|---|---|
| (Rio Grande do Norte) ABC | | | 4–1 | | 0–1 |
| (Ceará) Fortaleza | | | | 2–1 | 2–0 |
| (Bahia) Jacuipense | 0–0 | | | 0–1 | |
| Maranhão | | 1–3 | 2–3 | | |
| (Pernambuco) Retrô | 2–1 | 3–1 | | | |

Source:CBF
Legend: Blue = home team win; Yellow = draw; Red = away team win.

== Final stages ==
Starting from the quarter-finals, the teams played a single-elimination tournament with the following rules:

- Quarter-finals were played on a single-leg basis, with the higher-seeded team hosting the leg.
  - If tied, the penalty shoot-out would be used to determine the winners (Regulations Article 21).
- Semi-finals and Finals were played on a home-and-away two-legged basis, with the higher-seeded team hosting the second leg.
  - If tied on aggregate, the penalty shoot-out would be used to determine the winners (Regulations Article 21).
- Extra time would not be played and away goals rule would not be used in final stages.

Starting from the semi-finals, the teams were seeded according to their performance in the tournament. The teams were ranked according to overall points. If tied on overall points, the following criteria would be used to determine the ranking: 1. Overall wins; 2. Overall goal difference; 3. Overall goals scored; 4. Fewest red cards in the tournament; 5. Fewest yellow cards in the tournament; 6. Draw in the headquarters of the Brazilian Football Confederation (Regulations Article 19).

=== Bracket ===
Quarter-finals
(Sergipe) | Confiança | 1
(Ceará) | Fortaleza | 2
(Pernambuco) | Sport | 1
(Alagoas) | ASA | 0
(Bahia) | Vitória | 1
(Ceará) | Ceará | 0
(Rio Grande do Norte) | ABC | 4
(Bahia) | Juazeirense | 0

Semi-finals
(Ceará) | Fortaleza | 1 | 2 | 3
(Pernambuco) | Sport | 2 | 0 | 2
(Bahia) | Vitória | 6 | 4 | 10
(Rio Grande do Norte) | ABC | 2 | 3 | 5

Finals
(Ceará) | Fortaleza | 1 | 1 | 2
(Bahia) | Vitória | 2 | 2 | 4

=== Quarter-finals ===
| Team 1 | Score | Team 2 |
|---|---|---|
| Vitória (Bahia) | 1–0 | Ceará |
| Confiança (Sergipe) | 1–2 | (Ceará) Fortaleza |
| Sport (Pernambuco) | 1–0 | (Alagoas) ASA |
| ABC (Rio Grande do Norte) | 4–0 | (Bahia) Juazeirense |

==== Group E ====
6 May 2026
21:30

| Vitória (Bahia) | 1–0 | Ceará |
|---|---|---|
| Renato Kayzer 73' | Report |

Barradão, Salvador
Referee: Denis da Silva Ribeiro Serafim (Alagoas)

==== Group F ====
7 May 2026
19:30

| Confiança (Sergipe) | 1–2 | (Ceará) Fortaleza |
|---|---|---|
| Ícaro 88' (pen.) | Report | Vitinho 6'; Miritello 41' |

Batistão, Aracaju
Referee: Paulo José Souza Mourão (Maranhão)

==== Group G ====
6 May 2026
21:30

| Sport (Pernambuco) | 1–0 | (Alagoas) ASA |
|---|---|---|
| Felipinho 79' | Report |

Estádio Ilha do Retiro, Recife
Referee: Wagner Francisco Silva Souza (Bahia)

==== Group H ====
6 May 2026
19:00

| ABC (Rio Grande do Norte) | 4–0 | (Bahia) Juazeirense |
|---|---|---|
| Igor Bahia 4' (pen.), 39'; João Pedro 79'; Bruno Leite 90+1' | Report |

Arena das Dunas, Natal
Referee: Marcelo de Lima Henrique (Ceará)

=== Semi-finals ===
| Pos | Team | Pld | W | D | L | GF | GA | GD | Pts | Host |
|---|---|---|---|---|---|---|---|---|---|---|
| 2 | (Rio Grande do Norte) ABC | 6 | 4 | 1 | 1 | 15 | 4 | +11 | 13 | Second leg |
| 3 | (Bahia) Vitória | 6 | 4 | 1 | 1 | 15 | 8 | +7 | 13 | First leg |
| 1 | (Pernambuco) Sport | 6 | 5 | 0 | 1 | 12 | 3 | +9 | 15 | Second leg |
| 4 | (Ceará) Fortaleza | 6 | 4 | 1 | 1 | 8 | 5 | +3 | 13 | First leg |

Source: CBF

| Team 1 | Agg. | Team 2 | 1st leg | 2nd leg |
|---|---|---|---|---|
| Vitória (Bahia) | 10–5 | (Rio Grande do Norte) ABC | 6–2 | 4–3 |
| Fortaleza (Ceará) | 3–2 | (Pernambuco) Sport | 1–2 | 2–0 |

==== Group I ====
20 May 2023
21:00

| Vitória (Bahia) | 6–2 | (Rio Grande do Norte) ABC |
|---|---|---|
| Renato Kayzer 24', 45+11' (pen.); Renê 46', 58'; Osvaldo 82', 90+2' (pen.) | Report | Igor Bahia 7'; Wallyson 42' |

Barradão, Salvador
Referee: Léo Simão Holanda (Ceará)

27 May 2023
21:30

| ABC (Rio Grande do Norte) | 3–4 | (Bahia) Vitória |
|---|---|---|
| Luiz Fernando 15', 35'; Igor Bahia 87' | Report | Nathan Mendes 20'; Baralhas 72'; Fabri 88'; Erick 90+4' (pen.) |

Arena das Dunas, Natal
Referee: Antônio Dib Moraes de Sousa (Piauí)

==== Group J ====
20 May 2023
21:00

| Fortaleza (Ceará) | 1–2 | (Pernambuco) Sport |
|---|---|---|
| Luiz Fernando 72' | Report | Pedro Perotti 9', 46' |

Castelão, Fortaleza
Referee: Emerson Ricardo de Almeida Andrade (Bahia)

27 May 2023
21:30

| Sport (Pernambuco) | 0–2 | (Ceará) Fortaleza |
|---|---|---|
| | Report | Miritello 35'; Vitinho 56' |

Estádio Ilha do Retiro, Recife
Referee: Denis da Silva Ribeiro Serafim (Alagoas)

=== Finals ===
| Pos | Team | Pld | W | D | L | GF | GA | GD | Pts | Host |
|---|---|---|---|---|---|---|---|---|---|---|
| 1 | (Bahia) Vitória | 8 | 6 | 1 | 1 | 25 | 13 | +12 | 19 | 2nd leg |
| 2 | (Ceará) Fortaleza | 8 | 5 | 1 | 2 | 11 | 7 | +4 | 16 | 1st leg |

Source: CBF

| Team 1 | Agg. | Team 2 | 1st leg | 2nd leg |
|---|---|---|---|---|
| Fortaleza (Ceará) | 2–4 | (Bahia) Vitória | 1–2 | 1–2 |

==== Group K ====
2 June 2026
21:00

| Fortaleza (Ceará) | 1–2 | (Bahia) Vitória |
|---|---|---|
| Vitinho 54' | Report | Renato Kayzer 83' (pen.); Tarzia 90+2' |

Castelão, Fortaleza
Referee: Afro Rocha de Carvalho Filho (Paraíba)

6 June 2026
16:00

| Vitória (Bahia) | 2–1 | (Ceará) Fortaleza |
|---|---|---|
| Martínez 71'; Renato Kayzer 90' | Report | Luiz Fernando 27' |

Barradão, Salvador
Referee: Rodrigo José Pereira de Lima (Pernambuco)
