= Dominik Schad =

German footballer

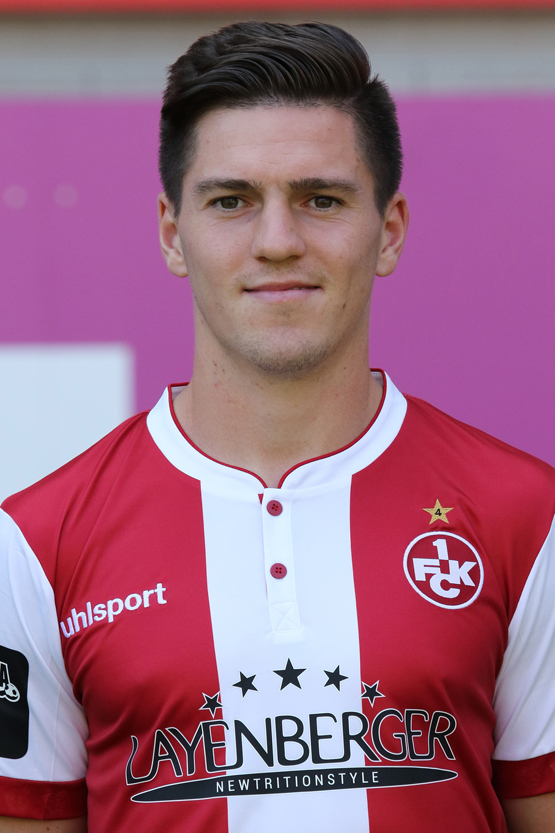
- Schad in 2018

Personal information
- Full name: Dominik Friedrich Schad
- Date of birth: 4 March 1997 (age 29)
- Place of birth: Aschaffenburg, Germany
- Height: 1.75 m (5 ft 9 in)
- Position: Defender

Team information
- Current team: Lamphun Warriors
- Number: 7

Youth career
- 2011–2016: Greuther Fürth

Senior career*
Years	Team	Apps	(Gls)
2016–2018	Greuther Fürth	11	(0)
2016–2018	→ Greuther Fürth II	46	(1)
2018–2023	1. FC Kaiserslautern	100	(1)
2023–2025	Preußen Münster	25	(0)
2026–	Lamphun Warriors	15	(0)

International career^{‡}
2015	Germany U19	3	(0)
2016–2017	Germany U20	5	(0)
- * Club domestic league appearances and goals as of 10 May 2026 ‡ National team caps and goals as of 02:59, 7 August 2016 (UTC)

Dominik Friedrich Schad (born 4 March 1997) is a German professional footballer who plays as a defender for Thai League 1 club Lamphun Warriors.
