= João Felipe (footballer, born 1998) =

Brazilian footballer

Personal information
- Full name: João Felipe Proscinski Giaccomoni
- Date of birth: 2 December 1998 (age 27)
- Place of birth: Erechim, Brazil
- Height: 1.80 m (5 ft 11 in)
- Position: Forward

Team information
- Current team: Inter de Limeira
- Number: 19

Youth career
- Ypiranga-RS
- 2018: → São José-RS (loan)

Senior career*
Years	Team	Apps	(Gls)
2018–2019	Ypiranga-RS	36	(3)
2019	Bagé	0	(0)
2020	Grêmio Anápolis	2	(0)
2020	Estrela do Norte	1	(0)
2021	VOCEM	15	(3)
2022	Matonense	8	(0)
2022	Esportivo	18	(5)
2022	Paraná	4	(0)
2022	São Luiz	0	(0)
2023	CSA	15	(1)
2023–	Inter de Limeira	19	(4)
2023	→ Concórdia (loan)	0	(0)
- * Club domestic league appearances and goals as of 14:29, 12 March 2024 (UTC)

João Felipe Proscinski Giaccomoni (born 2 December 1998), known as João Felipe or sometimes as Joãozinho, is a Brazilian professional footballer who plays for Inter de Limeira. Mainly a forward.

== Career ==
Born in Erechim, Rio Grande do Sul, João Felipe began his career with hometown side Ypiranga-RS. After being regularly used in the 2018 season, he lost his starting spot and moved to Bagé in 2019.

On 20 November 2019, João Felipe signed for Grêmio Anápolis. After being rarely used, he moved to Estrela do Norte before joining VOCEM on 19 February 2021.

On 29 November 2021, João Felipe agreed to a deal with Matonense. He signed for Esportivo the following 6 April, before moving to Paraná on 19 July.

On 5 September 2022, João Felipe was announced at São Luiz. After winning the Copa FGF, he moved to CSA on 27 December.

On 10 April 2023, João Felipe joined Inter de Limeira. After the club's elimination from the 2023 Série D, he was loaned to Concórdia on 31 August.

== Career statistics ==
As of 12 March 2024

Club	Season	League			State League		National Cup		Continental		Other		Total	
Club	Season	Division	Apps	Goals	Apps	Goals	Apps	Goals	Apps	Goals	Apps	Goals	Apps	Goals
Ypiranga-RS	2018	Série C	7	0	17	2	—		—		19 (Note: Appearance(s) in Copa FGF)	0	43	2
Ypiranga-RS	2019	Série C	4	1	8	0	1	0	—		—		13	1
Ypiranga-RS	Total		11	1	25	2	1	0	—		19	0	56	3
Bagé	2019	Gaúcho Série A2	—		—		—		—		5	1	5	1
Estrela do Norte	2020	Capixaba	—		1	0	—		—		—		1	0
VOCEM	2021	Paulista 2ª Divisão	—		15	3	—		—		—		15	3
Matonense	2022	Paulista A3	—		8	0	—		—		—		8	0
Esportivo	2022	Gaúcho Série A2	—		18	5	—		—		—		18	5
Paraná	2022	Série D	4	0	—		—		—		—		4	0
São Luiz	2022	Série D	—		—		—		—		11	6	11	6
CSA	2023	Série D	0	0	7	1	1	0	—		8 (Note: Appearance(s) in Copa do Nordeste)	0	16	1
Inter de Limeira	2023	Série D	12	4	—		—		—		—		12	4
Inter de Limeira	2024	Série D	0	0	7	0	—		—		—		7	0
Inter de Limeira	Total		12	4	7	0	—		—		—		19	4
Concórdia (loan)	2023	Série D	—		—		—		—		13 (Note: Appearance(s) in Copa Santa Catarina)	0	13	0
Career total			27	5	81	11	2	0	0	0	56	7	166	14

== Honours ==
Ypiranga-RS

- Campeonato Gaúcho Série A2: 2019

Esportivo

- Campeonato Gaúcho Série A2: 2022

São Luiz

- Copa FGF: 2022
