= Lamphun Warriors Stadium =

Coordinates: 18°28′48″N 98°59′00″E

Lamphun Warrior Stadium
- Interactive map of Lamphun Warrior Stadium
- Location: Lamphun, Thailand
- Operator: Lamphun Warriors F.C.
- Capacity: 5,400
- Surface: Grass

Tenant
- Lamphun Warriors F.C. 2024-

The Lamphun Warriors Stadium is a football-only stadium in Lamphun, Thailand. It is the home of Lamphun Warriors FC of the Thai League 1. It opened in 2024.

== See also ==
- Lamphun Province Stadium
