= Witthaya Moonwong =

Thai footballer (born 1993)

Personal information
- Date of birth: 9 October 1993 (age 33)
- Place of birth: Nan, Thailand
- Height: 1.75 m (5 ft 9 in)
- Positions: Left back; centre back

Team information
- Current team: Lamphun Warriors
- Number: 2

Youth career
- 2008–2010: Bangkok Sports School

Senior career*
Years	Team	Apps	(Gls)
2011	Bangkok Christian College	0	(0)
2011	Bangkok	0	(0)
2012–2014	BEC Tero Sasana	0	(0)
2012	→ RBAC (loan)	0	(0)
2013–2014	→ Songkhla United (loan)	16	(0)
2015	Songkhla United	22	(0)
2016	Prachuap	23	(0)
2017	Nakhon Pathom United	21	(0)
2017–2019	Nongbua Pitchaya	17	(0)
2020–2021	Trat	27	(0)
2021–2022	Uthai Thani	3	(0)
2022–2023	Police Tero	20	(0)
2023–	Lamphun Warriors	37	(1)

International career
2011–2012	Thailand U19	3	(0)
2014	Thailand U23	1	(0)
- * Club domestic league appearances and goals as of 14 March 2025

Witthaya Moonwong (Thai: วิทยา มูลวงศ์, born 9 October 1993) is a Thai professional footballer who currently plays for Lamphun Warriors in the Thai League 1.

== Honours ==
=== Club ===
Uthai Thani

- Thai League 3 (1): 2021–22
- Thai League 3 Northern Region (1): 2021–22

=== International ===
Thailand U-19

- AFF U-19 Youth Championship Champions (1): 2011
