= Frei Inocêncio =

Coordinates: 18°33′S 41°54′W

- Municipality
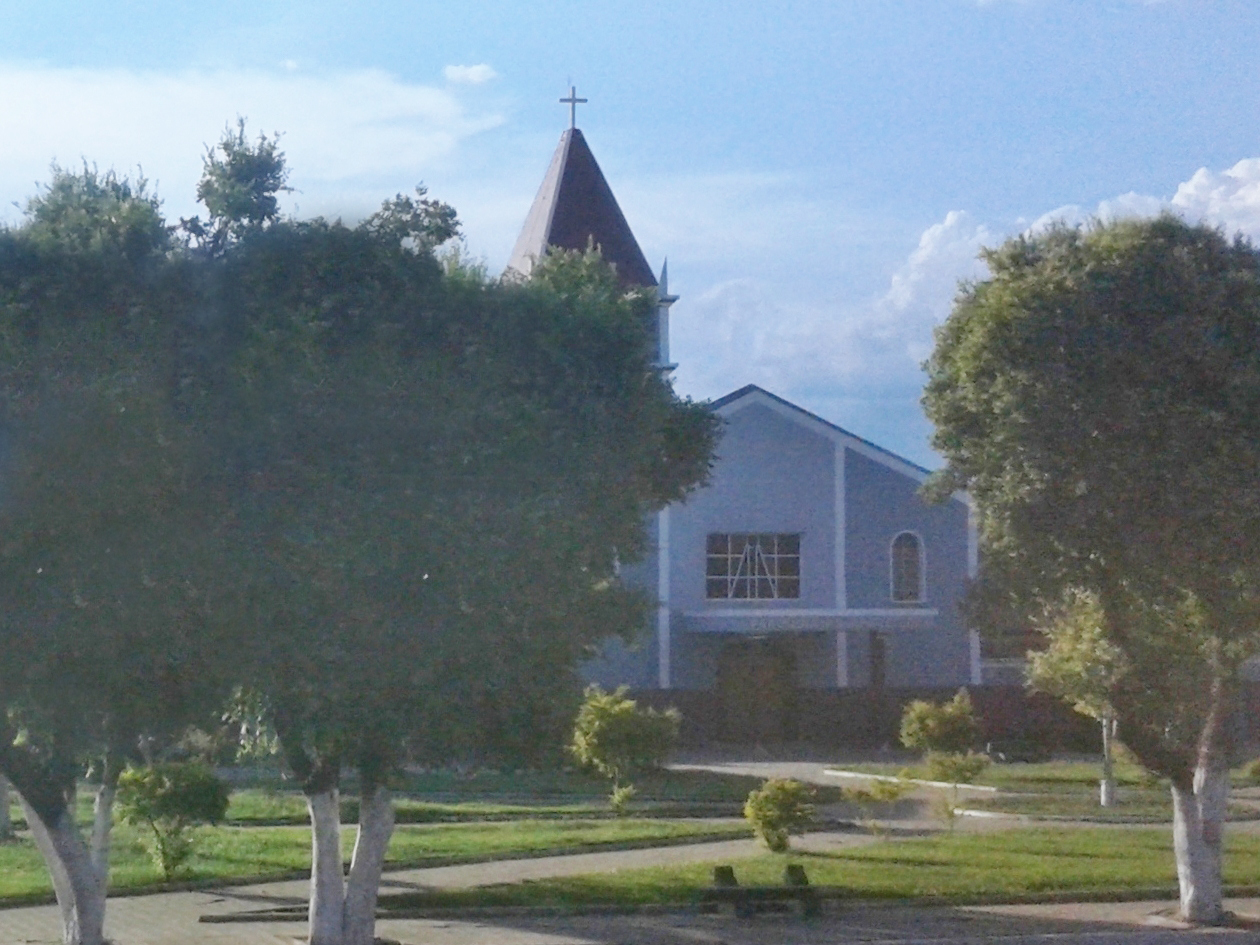

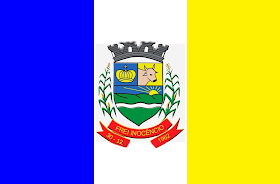
- Flag Coat of arms
- Interactive map of Frei Inocêncio
- Country: Brazil
- Region: Southeast
- State: Minas Gerais
- Mesoregion: Vale do Rio Doce

Government
  - Mayor: Lauro Franco (AVANTE)

Population (2022 Census)
  - Total: 8,226
  - Estimate (2025): 8,301
- Time zone: UTC−3 (BRT)

Frei Inocêncio is a municipality in the state of Minas Gerais in the Southeast region of Brazil.

== See also ==
- List of municipalities in Minas Gerais
