= Bruno Leite (footballer, born 2000) =

Brazilian footballer

Personal information
- Full name: Bruno da Silva Costa Leite
- Date of birth: 7 April 2000 (age 26)
- Place of birth: Maceió, Brazil
- Height: 1.80 m (5 ft 11 in)
- Position: Midfielder

Team information
- Current team: Botafogo-PB
- Number: 10

Youth career
- Athletico Paranaense

Senior career*
Years	Team	Apps	(Gls)
2019–2023	Athletico Paranaense	10	(1)
2022	→ Botafogo (loan)	0	(0)
2023	→ Joinville (loan)	6	(0)
2024–	Botafogo-PB	30	(2)
- * Club domestic league appearances and goals as of 18:15, 12 December 2023 (UTC)

Bruno da Silva Costa Leite (born 7 April 2000), known as Bruno Leite, is a Brazilian footballer who plays as a midfielder for Botafogo-PB.

== Career statistics ==
As of 29 March 2021.

Club	Season	League			State league		Cup		Continental		Other		Total	
Club	Season	Division	Apps	Goals	Apps	Goals	Apps	Goals	Apps	Goals	Apps	Goals	Apps	Goals
Athletico Paranaense	2019	Série A	0	0	2	1	0	0	—		—		2	1
Athletico Paranaense	2020	Série A	3	0	4	0	0	0	1 (Note: Appearance(s) in Copa Libertadores)	0	0	0	8	0
Athletico Paranaense	2021	Série A	0	0	0	0	0	0	0	0	—		0	0
Career total			3	0	6	1	0	0	1	0	0	0	10	1

== Honours ==
Athletico Paranaense

- Campeonato Paranaense: 2019, 2020
