= Lamphun Warriors F.C. =

Thai football club

Lamphun Warriors ลำพูน วอริเออร์
- Full name: Lamphun Warriors Football Club สโมสรฟุตบอลลำพูน วอริเออร์
- Nicknames: The White Cattles (ราชันโคขาว)
- Short name: LPWR
- Founded: 2011; 15 years ago
- Ground: Lamphun Warriors Stadium; Lamphun, Thailand
- Capacity: 5,000
- Owner: LC Marble
- Head coach: Dennis Amato
- League: Thai League 1
- 2025–26: Thai League 1, 12th of 16
- Website: https://lamphunwarriors.net/
| Home colours | Away colours |

Lamphun Warriors Football Club (Thai: สโมสรฟุตบอลลำพูน วอริเออร์) is a Thai professional association football club based in Lamphun province. Lamphun Warriors have played in the Thai League 1 after winning the Thai League 2 title in 2022.

== History ==
=== Formation and early years (2011–2018) ===
Lamphun Warriors were founded in 2011 to represent Lamphun province in the 2011 Thai Division 2 League Northern Region. The club was established with the aim of developing football in the northern region of Thailand and providing a pathway for local players to compete at the national level. Lamphun is one of the oldest cities in Thailand with deep Lanna cultural roots, and the club adopted the nickname “White Cattles” to symbolise the historical bravery and resilience associated with the region.The club initially played their matches mostly at the Mae Guang Stadium as their home ground.

The team initially competed in the Regional League Division 2 (the third tier of Thai football at the time), specifically in the Northern Region. During their early seasons, Lamphun Warriors focused on building a stable organisational structure, recruiting local talents, and establishing a loyal fanbase in the province. Although the club did not immediately challenge for promotion, it gradually improved its performances and became a competitive side within the northern regional league.

Throughout the 2010s, Lamphun Warriors developed a reputation as a well-organised provincial club. The team invested in youth development and strengthened its squad with experienced players from other Thai lower-division teams. Despite several mid-table finishes, the club remained committed to long-term growth rather than short-term success. With improved backing and a stronger squad, Lamphun Warriors became one of the leading clubs in the newly restructured Thai League 3. The club dominated the Northern Region during the 2020–21 season and qualified for the national championship stage.

=== Back-to-back promotion and league titles (2020–2023) ===
In 2021, Lamphun Warriors went on win the 2020–21 Thai League 3 title after staying in the third tier for four years which then see the team promoted to the 2021–22 Thai League 2 as champions where Brazilian player Natan Oliveira went on to win the 'Golden Boot award' with 12 goals in the season and goalkeeper, Adisak Duangsri who went on to win the league highest clean sheet with 10. The club’s momentum continued in the 2021–22 season where Lamphun Warriors built one of the strongest squads in the league, combining experienced Thai players with several foreign signings. In the club first season in the second tier, they won the league title becoming the first Thailand team to earn back-to-back promotion to the top flight.Lamphun Warriors then went on promote to the Thai League 1 ahead of the 2022–23 season. In their debut season in the top flight, Lamphun Warriors finished in 10th place in the league.

In the 2024–25 Thai League 1 season Lamphun Warriors finished 8th and lost the Thai League Cup final, losing 2–0 to Buriram United, which was the first time in the club's history that they reached the final.

== Team image ==
=== Crest and colours ===
The identity of Lamphun Warriors is closely connected to the cultural heritage of Lamphun Province. The club crest incorporates elements inspired by local history and the Lanna cultural tradition, symbolising pride, unity and the club’s strong connection to its community.

== Stadium ==
| Coordinates | Location | Stadium | Capacity | Year |
|---|---|---|---|---|
| 18°34′04″N 99°00′22″E | Lamphun | Mae Guang Stadium | 5,000 | 2011–2024 |
| 18°50′23″N 98°57′34″E | Chiang Mai | 700th Anniversary Stadium | 25,000 | 2022–2024 |
| 18°28′48″N 98°59′00″E | Lamphun | Lamphun Warriors Stadium | 5,400 | 2024–present |

== Season by season record ==
| Season | League | | | | | | | | | FA Cup | League Cup | Top goalscorer | |
| Season | Division | P | W | D | L | F | A | Pts | Pos | FA Cup | League Cup | Name | Goals |
|---|---|---|---|---|---|---|---|---|---|---|---|---|---|
| 2011 | North | 30 | 20 | 5 | 5 | 59 | 28 | 65 | 2nd | Opted out | Opted out | (Thailand) Pat Thongpenkul | 13 |
| 2012 | North | 34 | 13 | 8 | 13 | 45 | 38 | 47 | 9th | QR1 | R2 | (Thailand) Sarawut Wongchai | 13 |
| 2013 | North | 30 | 12 | 7 | 11 | 34 | 30 | 43 | 8th | Opted out | R2 | (Thailand) Pattawee Jeeraburanakit (Thailand) Sudnatee Na Chiangmai | 5 |
| 2014 | North | 26 | 7 | 12 | 7 | 29 | 27 | 33 | 8th | Opted out | QR2 | (Thailand) Pongsakorn Takum (Thailand) Saharat Kanyaroj (Thailand) Teerawut Wongtan | 4 |
| 2015 | North | 26 | 8 | 11 | 7 | 23 | 23 | 35 | 8th | Opted out | QF | (Thailand) Teerawut Wongtan | 4 |
| 2016 | North | 22 | 10 | 9 | 3 | 32 | 20 | 39 | 5th | Opted out | R2 | (Nigeria) Shola Jimmy Omotosho | 7 |
| 2017 | T3 Upper | 26 | 7 | 6 | 13 | 22 | 31 | 27 | 12th | Opted out | R1 | (Thailand) Panuwat Sripao (Thailand) Ekachai Pitsanu | 4 |
| 2018 | T3 Upper | 26 | 13 | 8 | 5 | 36 | 28 | 47 | 3rd | Opted out | QRP | (Thailand) Saran Sridech | 12 |
| 2019 | T3 Upper | 24 | 13 | 6 | 5 | 39 | 23 | 45 | 3rd | R1 | QRP | (Thailand) Ronnachai Pongputtha | 15 |
| 2020–21 | T3 North | 15 | 13 | 0 | 2 | 31 | 6 | 39 | 1st | R2 | cancelled | (Brazil) Natan Oliveira | 14 |
| 2021–22 | T2 | 34 | 22 | 8 | 4 | 66 | 30 | 74 | 1st | R3 | R1 | (Venezuela) Jeffrén Suárez | 12 |
| 2022–23 | T1 | 30 | 9 | 9 | 12 | 27 | 36 | 36 | 10th | R4 | QF | (Syria) Mohammed Osman | 5 |
| 2023–24 | T1 | 30 | 9 | 8 | 13 | 45 | 47 | 35 | 9th | QF | QF | (Thailand) Akarapong Pumwisat | 9 |
| 2024–25 | T1 | 30 | 9 | 10 | 11 | 36 | 39 | 37 | 8th | R2 | RU | (Thailand) Anan Yodsangwal | 8 |
| 2025–26 | T1 | 30 | 4 | 17 | 9 | 35 | 47 | 29 | 12th | | | | |

| Champions | Runners-up | Promoted | Relegated |

- P = Played
- W = Games won
- D = Games drawn
- L = Games lost
- F = Goals for
- A = Goals against
- Pts = Points
- Pos = Final position
- T1 = Thai League 1
- T2 = Thai League 2
- T3 = Thai League 3
- QR1 = First Qualifying Round
- QR2 = Second Qualifying Round
- QR3 = Third Qualifying Round
- QR4 = Fourth Qualifying Round
- RInt = Intermediate Round
- R1 = Round 1
- R2 = Round 2
- R3 = Round 3
- R4 = Round 4
- R5 = Round 5
- R6 = Round 6
- GS = Group stage
- QF = Quarter-finals
- SF = Semi-finals
- RU = Runners-up
- S = Shared
- W = Winners

== Players ==
=== Current squad ===
Note: Flags indicate national team as defined under FIFA eligibility rules; some limited exceptions apply. Players may hold more than one non-FIFA nationality.

| No. | Pos. | Nation | Player |
|---|---|---|---|
| 2 | DF | THA | Witthaya Moonwong |
| 4 | DF | THA | Jonas Schwabe (on loan from Uthai Thani) |
| 5 | MF | THA | Chatmongkol Thongkiri |
| 6 | DF | CRO | Christian Ilic |
| 7 | MF | GER | Dominik Schad |
| 8 | FW | THA | Athit Berg |
| 9 | FW | BRA | Anderson Chaves |
| 10 | FW | THA | Surat Susiyachai |
| 11 | FW | BRA | Luis Fellipe |
| 14 | MF | SYR | Mohammed Osman |
| 16 | DF | THA | Putthinan Wannasri |
| 17 | MF | BRA | Ralph |
| 18 | MF | THA | Purachet Thodsanit |
| 20 | GK | THA | Nont Muangngam |
| 21 | DF | THA | Nutee Noiwilai |

| No. | Pos. | Nation | Player |
|---|---|---|---|
| 23 | DF | ENG | Charlie Clough |
| 24 | DF | THA | Noppol Kerdkaew |
| 26 | GK | THA | Kwanchai Suklom |
| 27 | DF | THA | Ratthaphon Homala |
| 28 | FW | BRA | Rodrigo Maranhão |
| 29 | FW | THA | Tawan Khotrsupho |
| 30 | DF | THA | Suriya Singmui |
| 32 | MF | THA | Baworn Tapla |
| 33 | MF | AUT | Osarenren Okungbowa |
| 47 | DF | THA | Nuttasit Choosai |
| 75 | GK | THA | Phumworapol Wannabuta |
| 77 | FW | THA | Abdulahman Essadi |
| 82 | FW | GER | Arnold Suew |
| 96 | MF | THA | Natpakhan Promthongmee |
| 99 | GK | THA | Chawanvis Rattanaphansak |

=== Out on loan ===
Note: Flags indicate national team as defined under FIFA eligibility rules; some limited exceptions apply. Players may hold more than one non-FIFA nationality.

| No. | Pos. | Nation | Player |

== Honours ==
=== Domestic competitions ===
==== League ====
- Thai League 2
  - Winners: 2021–22
- Thai League 3
  - Winners: 2020–21
- Thai League 3 Northern Region
  - Winners: 2020–21
- Regional League Northern Division
  - Runners-up: 2011

==== Cup ====
- League Cup
  - Runners-up: 2024–25

== Managerial history ==
| Name | Period | Honours |
|---|---|---|
| (Thailand) Thongchai Sukkoki | 2 June 2017 – 14 November 2017 | |
| (Thailand) Jongsarit Wutchuay | 21 January 2019 - 8 November 2021 | – 2020–21 Thai League 3 |
| (Brazil) Wanderley Junior | 12 November 2021 – 20 May 2022 | – 2021–22 Thai League 2 |
| (Thailand) Dusit Chalermsang | 20 May 2022 – 7 November 2022 | |
| (Brazil) Alexandre Gama | 17 November 2022 – 27 April 2025 | – 2025 Thai League Cup runners-up |
| (Brazil) Wanderley Junior (2) | 12 June 2025 – 18 October 2025 | |
| (Serbia) Jongsarit Wutchuay (2) (interim) | 18 October 2025 – 15 December 2025 | |
| (Germany) Dennis Amato | 15 December 2025–present | |
