= Mohammed Osman =

Syrian footballer (born 1994)

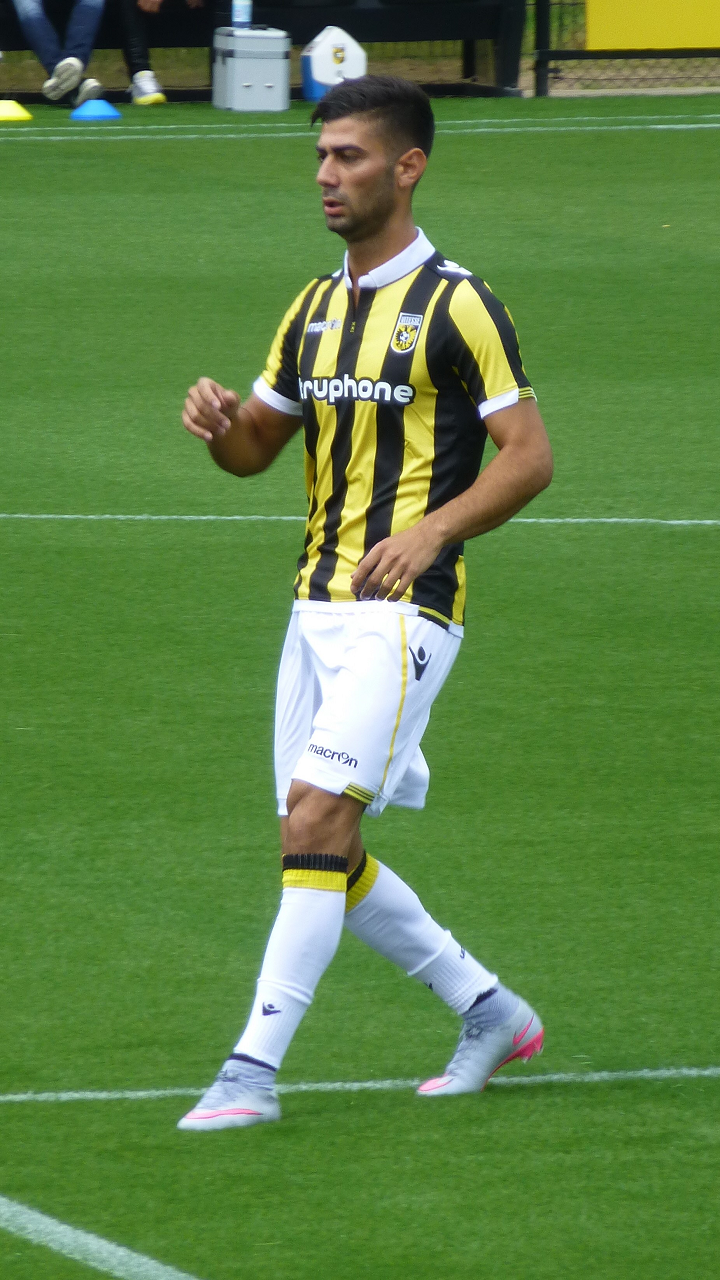
- Osman with Vitesse in 2015

Personal information
- Full name: Mohammed Osman
- Date of birth: 1 January 1994 (age 32)
- Place of birth: Qamishli, Syria
- Height: 1.84 m (6 ft 0 in)
- Position: Attacking midfielder

Team information
- Current team: Lamphun Warriors
- Number: 14

Youth career
- DVV
- 2008–2013: Vitesse

Senior career*
Years	Team	Apps	(Gls)
2013–2017	Vitesse II	80	(45)
2015–2017	Vitesse	4	(0)
2017–2018	Telstar	19	(7)
2018–2020	Heracles Almelo	51	(5)
2020–2021	Al-Kharaitiyat	21	(3)
2021–2022	Sparta Rotterdam	12	(0)
2022–	Lamphun Warriors	105	(26)

International career^{‡}
2009	Netherlands U16	3	(0)
2018–	Syria	35	(2)
- * Club domestic league appearances and goals as of 3 May 2026 ‡ National team caps and goals as of 17 November 2026

Mohammed Osman (Arabic: مُحَمَّد عُثمَان; born 1 January 1994) is a Syrian footballer who plays for a Thai League 1 club Lamphun Warriors as an attacking midfielder. He is known for his strong and precise outside of the box shots and his skillful playing style.

== Club career ==
Born in Qamishli, Syria, to a Kurdish family, Osman joined Vitesse's youth setup in 2008, aged 15, after starting it out at DVV. On 5 July 2013, he signed his first professional contract with the club. On 22 May 2015, Osman signed a new one-year contract with the club, being definitely promoted to the main squad. He made his first team – and Eredivisie – debut on 14 August, coming on as a late substitute in a 3–0 home win against Roda JC. On 6 September 2017, it was announced that Vitesse had terminated Osman's contract.

On 11 September 2017, Osman joined Eerste Divisie side Telstar following his release from Vitesse.

On 10 September 2021, he returned to the Netherlands and signed with Sparta Rotterdam. On 11 January 2022, Sparta and Osman agreed to terminate the contract. On 28 June 2022, he signed with Lamphun Warriors, after he agreed to terminate the contract with Sparta Rotterdam.

== International career ==
Osman was born in Syria, but raised in the Netherlands. He represented the Netherlands U16 in the 'Val de Mar Tournoi' in 2009.

He started his international career with Syria on the 6th of September 2018 in a friendly match against Uzbekistan, he played the whole 90 minutes.

=== International goals ===
Scores and results list Syria's goal totally first.

No.	Date	Venue	Opponent	Score	Result	Competition
1.	25 March 2021	Bahrain National Stadium, Riffa, Bahrain	Bahrain	1–1	1–3	Friendly
2.	11 October 2024	Tinsulanon Stadium, Songkhla, Thailand	Tajikistan	1–0	1–0	2024 King's Cup

== Career statistics ==
As of 29 February 2020.

Club	Season	League			KNVB Cup		Europe		Other		Total	
Club	Season	Division	Apps	Goals	Apps	Goals	Apps	Goals	Apps	Goals	Apps	Goals
Vitesse	2015–16	Eredivisie	1	0	0	0	0	0	—		1	0
Vitesse	2016–17	Eredivisie	3	0	2	0	—		—		5	0
Vitesse	Total		4	0	2	0	0	0	—		6	0
Jong Vitesse	2016–17	Tweede Divisie	27	8	0	0	–		–		27	8
Jong Vitesse	Total		27	8	0	0	–		–		27	8
Telstar	2017–18	Eerste Divisie	19	7	1	0	—		—		20	7
Telstar	Total		19	7	1	0	—		—		20	7
Heracles Almelo	2017–18	Eredivisie	5	0	0	0	—		—		5	0
Heracles Almelo	2018–19	Eredivisie	33	5	2	0	0	0	2	0	37	5
Heracles Almelo	2019–20	Eredivisie	13	0	1	0	—		—		14	0
Heracles Almelo	Total		51	5	3	0	0	0	2	0	56	5
Al Kharaitiyat	2020–21	Qatar Stars League	0	0	0	0	—		—		0	0
Al Kharaitiyat	Total		0	0	0	0	—		—		0	0
Career total			101	20	6	0	0	0	0	0	109	20

== Honours ==
Vitesse

- KNVB Cup: 2016–17
