= Nont Muangngam =

Thai footballer (born 1997)

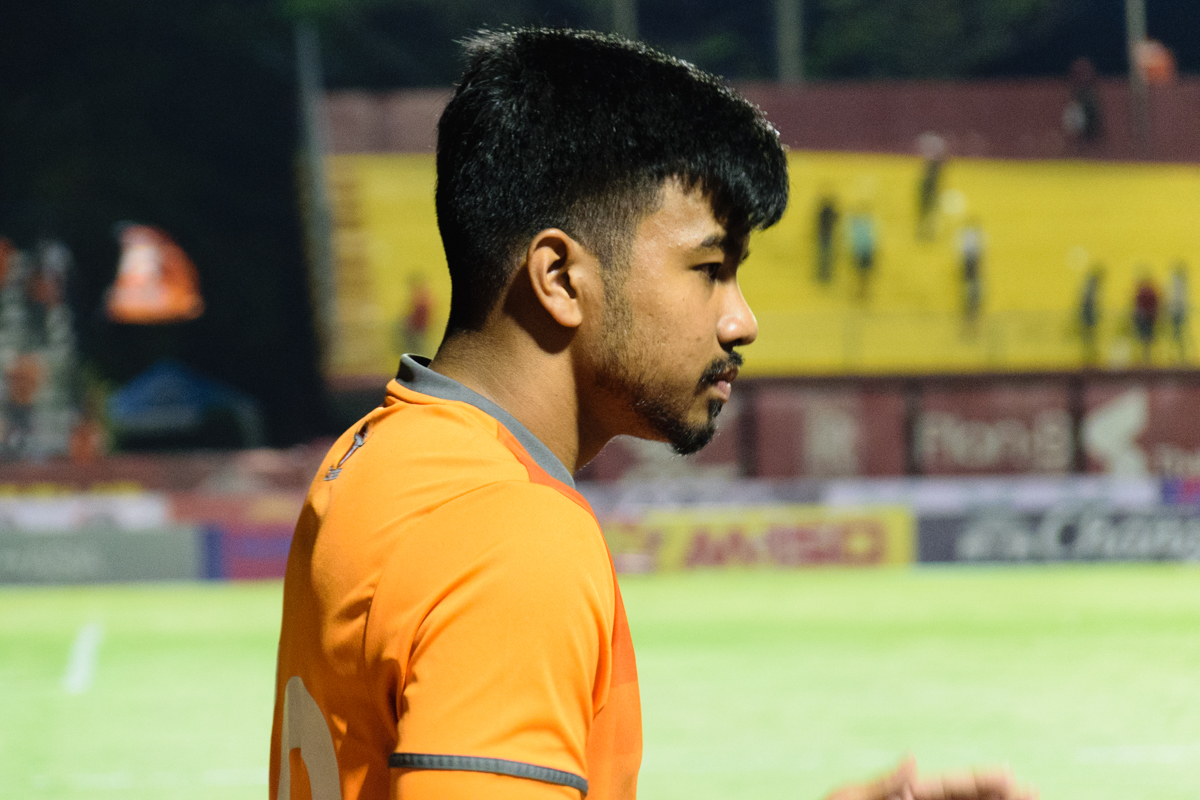
- Nont in March 2018

Personal information
- Full name: Nont Muangngam
- Date of birth: 20 April 1997 (age 29)
- Place of birth: Ang Thong, Thailand
- Height: 1.81 m (5 ft 11 in)
- Position: Goalkeeper

Team information
- Current team: Lamphun Warriors
- Number: 20

Youth career
- 2006–2008: FT Moselle Liverdun
- 2008–2016: Nancy

Senior career*
Years	Team	Apps	(Gls)
2016–2022	Chiangrai United	12	(0)
2018	→ Police Tero (loan)	30	(0)
2019	→ Chiangmai (loan)	15	(0)
2021–2022	→ Chiangmai United (loan)	19	(0)
2022–	Lamphun Warriors	64	(0)

International career^{‡}
2013	France U16	3	(0)
2018	Thailand U21	3	(0)
2017–2020	Thailand U23	26	(0)
Medal record
Thailand under-23
Sea Games
Gold medal – first place	Sea Games 2017	Football
- * Club domestic league appearances and goals as of 14 March 2025 ‡ National team caps and goals as of 5 December 2019

Nont Muangngam (Thai: นนท์ ม่วงงาม, born 20 April 1997), simply known as Nont (Thai: นนท์), is a Thai-French professional footballer who plays as a goalkeeper for Thai League 1 club Lamphun Warriors.

== International career ==
In August 2017, he won the Football at the 2017 Southeast Asian Games with Thailand U23.

== Honours ==
=== Club ===
Chiangrai United

- Thai FA Cup: 2017

=== International ===
Thailand U-23

- Sea Games Gold Medal; 2017
