= Copa do Nordeste =

- Organiser(s): Brazilian Football Confederation
- Founded: 1994; 32 years ago
- Region: Brazil's Northeast
- Teams: 20
- Qualifier for: Copa do Brasil (third stage)
- Current champions: (Bahia) Vitória (5th title)
- Most championships: Bahia and Vitória (5 titles each)
- Broadcaster(s): SBT; DAZN; Nosso Futebol
- Website: Official website
- 2026 Copa do Nordeste

Copa do Nordeste (English: Cup of the North-East), also known as Campeonato do Nordeste (English: Championship of the North-East) or Copa Nordeste (English: Northeastern Cup) is a Brazilian football competition among Northeastern region teams. It is sometimes informally referred to as Lampions League – in reference to the UEFA Champions League and bandit folk hero Lampião.

== History ==
The competition was first played in 1994. From 1997 to 1999, the Campeonato do Nordeste champions granted qualification to Copa Conmebol.

From 2000 to 2002, the Campeonato do Nordeste champions granted qualification to the Copa dos Campeões.

The competition returned in 2010, after being defunct since 2003. Copa do Nordeste returned again in 2013.

From 2014 to 2016, the winner got a spot in the Copa Sudamericana. The Copa do Nordeste champion now qualifies to the Copa do Brasil. After 2026 onwards, teams qualified for the Copa Libertadores and Copa Sudamericana will no longer participate in the competition due to the conflict of matches schedule.

== Competition format ==
Since 2018 a qualifying tournament called Pré-Copa do Nordeste has been played. In this tournament, eight teams compete in a single-elimination tournament where the four winners advance to the Copa do Nordeste.

The Copa do Nordeste has in its first stage two groups. 12 teams gain direct entries into the group stage while the other four berths are decided by the Pré-Copa do Nordeste.

In the group stage, each group is played on a single round-robin basis against the eight clubs from the other group. The top four teams of each group advance to the quarter-finals.

The quarter-finals, semi-finals and finals are played a single-elimination tournament. Only the finals are played on a home-and-away two-legged basis, with the best tournament team hosting the second leg, while quarter-finals and semi-finals are played on a single-leg basis, with the higher-seeded team hosting the leg.

== List of champions ==
Year	Champion	Final match	Runners-up	Third place	Fourth place
1994	Sport (1); PE	0 – 0 (3–2 pen.)	CRB; AL	Bahia; BA	Cruzeiro de Arapiraca; AL
1995–1996	Not held				
1997	Vitória (1); BA	3 – 0; 1 – 2 Aggregate; 4 – 2	Bahia; BA	Sport; PE	Ceará; CE
1998	América (1); RN	1 – 2; 3 – 1 Aggregate; 4 – 3	Vitória; BA	Bahia; BA	Santa Cruz; PE
1999	Vitória (2); BA	2 – 0; 0 – 1 Aggregate; 2 – 1	Bahia; BA	CSA; AL	Sport; PE
2000	Sport (2); PE	2 – 2; 2 – 2 Aggregate; 4 – 4	Vitória; BA	Poções; BA	Sergipe; SE
2001	Bahia (1); BA	3 – 1	Sport; PE	Náutico; PE	Fortaleza; CE
2002	Bahia (2); BA	3 – 1; 2 – 2 Aggregate; 5 – 3	Vitória; BA	Náutico; PE	Santa Cruz; PE
2003	Vitória (3); BA	1 – 1; 0 – 0 Aggregate; 1 – 1	Fluminense de Feira; BA	ABC; RN	América; RN
2004–2009	Not held				
2010	Vitória (4); BA	2 – 1	ABC; RN	CSA; AL	Treze; PB
2011–2012	Not held				
2013	Campinense (1); PB	2 – 1; 2 – 0 Aggregate; 4 – 1	ASA; AL	Ceará; CE	Fortaleza; CE
2014	Sport (3); PE	2 – 0; 1 – 1 Aggregate; 3 – 1	Ceará; CE	América; RN	Santa Cruz; PE
2015	Ceará (1); CE	1 – 0; 2 – 1 Aggregate; 3 – 1	Bahia; BA	Vitória; BA	Sport; PE
2016	Santa Cruz (1); PE	2 – 1; 1 – 1 Aggregate; 3 – 2	Campinense; PB	Bahia; BA	Sport; PE
2017	Bahia (3); BA	1 – 1; 1 – 0 Aggregate; 2 – 1	Sport; PE	Vitória; BA	Santa Cruz; PE
2018	Sampaio Corrêa (1); MA	1 – 0; 0 – 0 Aggregate; 1 – 0	Bahia; BA	ABC; RN	Ceará; CE
2019	Fortaleza (1); CE	1 – 0; 1 – 0 Aggregate; 2 – 0	Botafogo; PB	Náutico; PE	Santa Cruz; PE
2020	Ceará (2); CE	3 – 1; 1 – 0 Aggregate; 4 – 1	Bahia; BA	Fortaleza; CE	Confiança; SE
2021	Bahia (4); BA	0 – 1; 2 – 1 (4–2 pen.)	Ceará; CE	Fortaleza; CE	Vitória; BA
2022	Fortaleza (2); CE	1 – 1; 1 – 0 Aggregate; 2 – 1	Sport; PE	Náutico; PE	CRB; AL
2023	Ceará (3); CE	2 – 1; 0 – 1 (4–2 pen.)	Sport; PE	Fortaleza; CE	ABC; RN
2024	Fortaleza (3); CE	2 – 0; 0 – 2 (5–4 pen.)	CRB; AL	Bahia; BA	Sport; PE
2025	Bahia (5); BA	4 – 1; 5 – 0 Aggregate; 9 – 1	Confiança; SE	Ceará; CE	CSA; AL
2026	Vitória (5); BA	2 – 1; 2 – 1 Aggregate; 4 – 2	Fortaleza; CE	ABC; RN	Sport; PE

== Performances ==
=== By club ===
Performance in the Northeastern Cup by club
Club	Winners	Runners-up	Years winners	Years runners-up
Bahia	5	5	2001, 2002, 2017, 2021, 2025	1997, 1999, 2015, 2018, 2020
Vitória	5	3	1997, 1999, 2003, 2010, 2026	1998, 2000, 2002
Sport	3	4	1994, 2000, 2014	2001, 2017, 2022, 2023
Ceará	3	2	2015, 2020, 2023	2014, 2021
Fortaleza	3	1	2019, 2022, 2024	2026
Campinense	1	1	2013	2016
América	1	0	1998	—
Sampaio Corrêa	1	0	2018	—
Santa Cruz	1	0	2016	—
CRB	0	2	—	1994, 2024
ABC	0	1	—	2010
ASA	0	1	—	2013
Botafogo-PB	0	1	—	2019
Confiança	0	1	—	2025
Fluminense de Feira	0	1	—	2003

=== By state ===
Performance by state
State	Winners	Runners-up
Bahia	10	9
Ceará	6	3
Pernambuco	4	4
Paraíba	1	2
Rio Grande do Norte	1	1
Maranhão	1	0
Alagoas	0	3
Sergipe	0	1
Piauí	0	0

== Top scorers ==
Year	Player (team)	Goals
1994	Fábio (Sport)	5
1997	Nildo (Ceará)	6
1998	Paulinho Kobayashi (América de Natal)	9
1999	Ueslei (Bahia)	10
2000	Leonardo (ABC); Pedro Costa (Sergipe)	6
2001	Kuki (Náutico)	12
2002	Sérgio Alves (Bahia)	13
2003	Nádson (Vitória)	5
2010	Cristiano Alagoano (Confiança)	10
2013	Marcelo Nicácio (Vitória); Rodrigo Silva (ABC)	5
2014	Magno Alves (Ceará)	8
2015	Max (América de Natal)	6
2016	Rodrigão (Campinense)	9
2017	Régis (Bahia)	6
2018	Arthur Cabral (Ceará); Yago Felipe (Vitória)	5
2019	Gilberto (Bahia); Júnior Santos (Fortaleza)	8
2020	Vina (Ceará)	5
2021	Gilberto (Bahia)	8
2022	(Colombia) Hugo Rodallega (Bahia)	8
2023	(Argentina) Juan Martín Lucero (Fortaleza); Luciano Juba (Sport)	6
2024	Moisés (Fortaleza)	7
2025	Tiago (Bahia)	6
2026	Renato Kayzer (Vitória); Wallyson (ABC)	6

== Winning managers ==
Year	Manager	Club
1994	Givanildo Oliveira	Sport
1997	Arturzinho	Vitória
1998	Arturzinho	América de Natal
1999	Ricardo Gomes	Vitória
2000	Celso Roth	Sport
2001	Evaristo de Macedo	Bahia
2002	Bobô	Bahia
2003	Joel Santana	Vitória
2011	Ricardo Silva	Vitória
2013	Oliveira Canindé	Campinense
2014	Eduardo Baptista	Sport
2015	Silas	Ceará
2016	Milton Mendes	Santa Cruz
2017	Guto Ferreira	Bahia
2018	Roberto Fonseca	Sampaio Corrêa
2019	Rogério Ceni	Fortaleza
2020	Guto Ferreira	Ceará
2021	Dado Cavalcanti	Bahia
2022	(Argentina) Juan Pablo Vojvoda	Fortaleza
2023	Eduardo Barroca	Ceará
2024	(Argentina) Juan Pablo Vojvoda	Fortaleza
2025	Rogério Ceni	Bahia
2026	Jair Ventura	Vitória
