= 2021 Sport Club do Recife season =

Sport Recife
2021 season
- Chairman: Yuri Romão
- Manager: Ricardo Severo (c); Jair Ventura; Emílio Faro (c); Cesar Lucena (c); Umberto Louzer; Gustavo Florentín
- Stadium: Ilha do Retiro
- Série A: 19th
- Pernambucano: Runners-up
- Copa do Nordeste: Group stage
- Copa do Brasil: First stage
- Top goalscorer: League: Mikael (8); All: Mikael (15)
Home colours	Away colours	Third colours

The 2021 season was Sport Recife's 117th season in the club's history. Sport competed in the Campeonato Pernambucano, Copa do Nordeste, Série A and Copa do Brasil.

== Squad ==
Note: Flags indicate national team as defined under FIFA eligibility rules; some limited exceptions apply. Players may hold more than one non-FIFA nationality.

No.	Pos.	Nation	Player
1	GK	BRA	Mailson
2	DF	BRA	Hayner
5	MF	BRA	Ronaldo Henrique
7	FW	BRA	Neilton
8	MF	BRA	Hernanes
9	FW	COL	Santiago Tréllez
10	MF	BRA	Gustavo
11	FW	URU	Leandro Barcia
13	DF	BRA	Renzo
14	MF	BRA	Zé Welison
15	DF	BRA	Rafael Thyere
18	MF	BRA	Betinho
19	MF	BRA	Thiago Lopes
28	MF	BRA	João Igor
31	FW	BRA	Paulinho
32	GK	BRA	Denival
33	DF	BRA	Pedro Henrique
35	DF	BRA	Sabino
36	FW	BRA	Vander Vieira

No.	Pos.	Nation	Player
37	FW	BRA	Everaldo
43	DF	BRA	Marcelo
44	DF	BRA	Chico
46	DF	BRA	Luciano Juba
49	FW	BRA	Cristiano
50	MF	BRA	Ítalo
52	DF	BRA	Victor Gabriel
53	DF	BRA	Pedrão
56	DF	BRA	Sander (captain)
66	DF	BRA	Ewerthon
77	MF	BRA	Marcão
91	MF	BRA	Pedro Victor
92	GK	BRA	Carlos Eduardo
93	DF	BRA	Ryan
94	FW	BRA	Paulinho Moccelin
95	GK	BRA	Saulo
97	MF	BRA	Everton Felipe
99	FW	BRA	Mikael
—	MF	ARG	Nicolás Aguirre

== Statistics ==
=== Overall ===
Games played	59 (12 Pernambucano, 8 Copa do Nordeste, 1 Copa do Brasil, 38 Série A)
Games won	17 (7 Pernambucano, 1 Copa do Nordeste, 0 Copa do Brasil, 9 Série A)
Games drawn	18 (4 Pernambucano, 3 Copa do Nordeste, 0 Copa do Brasil, 11 Série A)
Games lost	24 (1 Pernambucano, 4 Copa do Nordeste, 1 Copa do Brasil, 18 Série A)
Goals scored	51
Goals conceded	62
Goal difference	–11
Best results (goal difference)	3–0 (H) v Vitória das Tabocas - Pernambucano - 2021.04.14; 3–0 (H) v Náutico - Pernambucano - 2021.05.02
Worst result (goal difference)	0–4 (A) v Bahia - Copa do Nordeste - 2021.03.20; 0–4 (H) v Ceará - Copa do Nordeste - 2021.04.03
Top scorer	Mikael (15)

Source: Sport Recife official website

=== Goalscorers ===
Place	Pos.	Nat.	No.	Name	Campeonato Pernambucano	Copa do Nordeste	Copa do Brasil	Série A	Total
1	FW	(Brazil)	99	Mikael	5	1	1	8	15
2	FW	(Brazil)	94	Paulinho Moccelin	0	0	0	3	3
3	DF	(Brazil)	34	Adryelson	2	0	0	0	2
=	FW	(Brazil)	90	André Felipe	0	0	0	2	2
=	MF	(Brazil)	10	Gustavo	0	0	0	2	2
=	MF	(Brazil)	88	Jonas Toró	1	1	0	0	2
=	FW	(Brazil)	7	Neilton	2	0	0	0	2
=	DF	(Brazil)	15	Rafael Thyere	0	2	0	0	2
=	MF	(Brazil)	19	Thiago Lopes	2	0	0	0	2
=	MF	(Brazil)	30	Thiago Neves	1	0	0	1	2
=	MF	(Brazil)	14	Zé Welison	0	0	0	2	2
4	DF	(Brazil)	44	Chico	0	0	0	1	1
=	FW	(Brazil)	37	Everaldo	1	0	0	0	1
=	DF	(Brazil)	66	Ewerthon	0	1	0	0	1
=	MF	(Brazil)	39	Ítalo	1	0	0	0	1
=	DF	(Brazil)	6	Iago Maidana	1	0	0	0	1
=	FW	(Uruguay)	11	Leandro Barcia	0	0	0	1	1
=	DF	(Brazil)	46	Luciano Juba	0	0	0	1	1
=	MF	(Brazil)	77	Marcão	0	0	0	1	1
=	FW	(Brazil)	53	Paulinho	1	0	0	0	1
=	FW	(Brazil)	5	Ronaldo	0	0	1	0	1
=	DF	(Brazil)	12	Sander	0	0	0	1	1
=	FW	(Colombia)	9	Santiago Tréllez	0	0	0	1	1
=	FW	(Brazil)	19	Vinícius Popó	1	0	0	0	1
				Own goals	1	1	0	0	2
				Total	19	6	2	24	51

=== Managers performance ===
Name	From	To	P	W	D	L	GF	GA	Avg%	Ref
(Brazil) Ricardo Severo (c)	24 February 2021	28 August 2021	3	1	1	1	3	3	44%	
(Brazil) Jair Ventura	28 February 2021	3 April 2021	9	2	3	4	9	16	33%	
(Brazil) Emílio Faro (c)	3 March 2021	3 March 2021	1	0	0	1	1	2	0%	
(Brazil) Cesar Lucena (c)	7 April 2021	6 November 2021	5	2	2	1	7	3	53%	
(Brazil) Umberto Louzer	24 April 2021	22 August 2021	22	6	8	8	15	16	39%	
(Paraguay) Gustavo Florentín	5 September 2021	9 December 2021	19	6	4	9	16	22	38%	

(c) Indicates the caretaker manager

=== Home record ===
Recife	São Lourenço da Mata
Ilha do Retiro	Arena Pernambuco
Capacity: 32,983	Capacity: 44,300
18 matches (4 wins 6 draws 8 losses)	11 matches (5 wins 4 draws 2 losses)

=== Overview ===
Competition	First match	Last match	Starting round	Final position	Record							
Competition	First match	Last match	Starting round	Final position	Pld	W	D	L	GF	GA	GD	Win %
Série A	30 May	9 December	Matchday 1	19th	38	9	11	18	24	37	−13	23.68
Campeonato Pernambucano	24 February	23 May	First stage	2nd	12	7	4	1	19	6	+13	58.33
Copa do Nordeste	28 February	10 April	Group stage	15th	8	1	3	4	6	16	−10	12.50
Copa do Brasil	10 March	10 March	First round	64th	1	0	0	1	2	3	−1	0.00
Total					59	17	18	24	51	62	−11	28.81

Source: Competitions

== Official Competitions ==
=== Campeonato Pernambucano ===
==== First stage ====
24 February 2021 1	Vera Cruz	1–3	Sport	São Lourenço da Mata
19:00 (UTC-3)	Pedrão 36' (o.g.)	Report	Ítalo 51'; Paulinho 55'; Vinícius Popó 72' (pen.)	Stadium: Estádio Governador Carlos Wilson Campos (Arena Pernambuco); Referee: Anderson Luis Marques

3 March 2021 2	Sport	1–2	Salgueiro	Recife
18:00 (UTC-3)	Mikael 13'	Report	Leozão 17'; Raimundinho 90+5'	Stadium: Estádio Adelmar da Costa Carvalho (Ilha do Retiro); Referee: Diego Fernando

14 March 2021 3	Santa Cruz	1–1	Sport	Recife
16:00 (UTC-3)	Pipico 84'	Report	Mikael 31'	Stadium: Estádio José do Rego Maciel (Arruda); Referee: Deborah Cecília

28 March 2021 4	Sport	2–0	Central	Recife
16:00 (UTC-3)	Thiago Neves 21'; Jonas Toró 85'	Report		Stadium: Estádio Adelmar da Costa Carvalho (Ilha do Retiro); Referee: Tiago Nascimento dos Santos

7 April 2021 5	Afogados da Ingazeira	0–0	Sport	Afogados da Ingazeira
20:00 (UTC-3)		Report		Stadium: Estádio Municipal Valdemar Viana de Araújo; Referee: Hugo Soares Dias Figueiredo

14 April 2021 6	Sport	3–0	Vitória das Tabocas	Recife
21:30 (UTC-3)	Adryelson 38'; Thiago Lopes 53'; Mikael 77'	Report		Stadium: Estádio Adelmar da Costa Carvalho (Ilha do Retiro); Referee: Nairon Pereira de Lira

18 April 2021 7	Sete de Setembro	0–2	Sport	Caruaru
18:00 (UTC-3)		Report	Thiago Lopes 28'; Mikael 73' (pen.)	Stadium: Estádio Luiz José de Lacerda; Referee: Michelangelo Martins de Almeida Júnior

24 April 2021 8	Retrô	0–1	Sport	São Lourenço da Mata
17:45 (UTC-3)		Report	Neilton 54'	Stadium: Estádio Governador Carlos Wilson Campos (Arena Pernambuco); Referee: Braulio da Silva Machado

2 May 2021 9	Sport	3–0	Náutico	Recife
16:00 (UTC-3)	Neilton 4'; Ronaldo Alves 45' (o.g.); Adryelson 54'	Report		Stadium: Estádio Adelmar da Costa Carvalho (Ilha do Retiro); Referee: Rodrigo Pereira

==== Semi-final ====
10 May 2021 Single match	Sport	1–0	Salgueiro	São Lourenço da Mata
20:00 (UTC-3)	Iago Maidana 82' (pen.)	Report		Stadium: Estádio Governador Carlos Wilson Campos (Arena Pernambuco); Referee: Anderson Daronco

==== Finals ====
16 May 2021 First leg	Sport	1–1	Náutico	São Lourenço da Mata
16:00 (UTC-3)	Everaldo 45+1'	Report	Wagner Leonardo 51'	Stadium: Estádio Governador Carlos Wilson Campos (Arena Pernambuco); Referee: Wagner do Nascimento Magalhães

23 May 2021 Second leg	Náutico	1–1 (5–3 p)	Sport	Recife
16:00 (UTC-3)	Kieza 78'	Report	Mikael 87'	Stadium: Estádio Eládio de Barros Carvalho (Aflitos); Referee: Rodolpho Toski Marques
	Penalties
	Jean Carlos (penalty scored); Vinícius (penalty scored); Hereda (penalty scored); Giovanny (penalty scored); Kieza (penalty scored)		(penalty scored) Igor Maidana; (penalty scored) Mikael; (penalty scored) Tréllez; (penalty missed) Marquinhos

==== Record ====
Final Position	Points	Matches	Wins	Draws	Losses	Goals For	Goals Away	Win%
2nd	25	12	7	4	1	19	6	58%

=== Copa do Nordeste ===
==== Group stage ====
28 February 2021 1	Sport	1–1	Sampaio Corrêa	Recife
20:00 (UTC-3)	Paulo Sérgio 59' (o.g.)	Report	Chico 72' (o.g.)	Stadium: Estádio Adelmar da Costa Carvalho (Ilha do Retiro); Referee: Antônio Magno Lima Cordeiro

6 March 2021 2	CRB	2–0	Sport	Maceió
16:00 (UTC-3)	Lucão do Break 45+3'; Wesley 90+3'	Report		Stadium: Estádio Rei Pelé; Referee: Tarcísio Flores Silva

17 March 2021 3	Sport	1–1	4 de Julho	Recife
18:00 (UTC-3)	Rafael Thyere 45+3'	Report	Diguinho 16'	Stadium: Estádio Adelmar da Costa Carvalho (Ilha do Retiro); Referee: Adriano Barros Carneiro

20 March 2021 4	Bahia	4–0	Sport	Salvador
16:00 (UTC-3)	Patrick de Lucca 28'; Gabriel Novaes 45+3', 79'; Rodriguinho 63'	Report		Stadium: Estádio Governador Roberto Santos (Pituaçu); Referee: Leo Simão Holanda

23 March 2021 5	Sport	0–1	Confiança	Recife
19:00 (UTC-3)		Report	Bruninho 23'	Stadium: Estádio Adelmar da Costa Carvalho (Ilha do Retiro); Referee: José Henrique de Azevedo Júnior

31 March 2021 6	Santa Cruz	1–2	Sport	Recife
21:30 (UTC-3)	Chiquinho 63' (pen.)	Report	Rafael Thyere 36'; Jonas Toró 90+6'	Stadium: Estádio José do Rego Maciel (Arruda); Referee: Wagner Reway

3 April 2021 7	Sport	0–4	Ceará	Recife
16:00 (UTC-3)		Report	Gabriel Dias 30'; Cléber 34'; Mendoza 77'; Pedro Naressi 90+2'	Stadium: Estádio Adelmar da Costa Carvalho (Ilha do Retiro); Referee: Diego Pombo Lopez

10 April 2021 8	Treze	2–2	Sport	Campina Grande
16:00 (UTC-3)	Kleiton 34'; João Leonardo 80'	Report	Mikael 7'; Ewerthon 14'	Stadium: Estádio Governador Ernani Sátyro (Amigão); Referee: Antonio Dib Moraes de Sousa

==== Record ====
Final Position	Points	Matches	Wins	Draws	Losses	Goals For	Goals Away	Win%
15th	6	8	1	3	4	6	16	12%

=== Copa do Brasil ===
==== First round ====
10 March 2021 Single match	Juazeirense	3–2	Sport	Juazeiro
19:15 (UTC-3)	Kesley 2'; Clebson 47'; Dedé 67'	Report	Ronaldo 12' (pen.); Mikael 21'	Stadium: Estádio Adauto Moraes; Referee: Ramon Abatti Abel

==== Record ====
Final Position	Points	Matches	Wins	Draws	Losses	Goals For	Goals Away	Win%
64th	0	1	0	0	1	2	3	0%

=== Série A ===
30 May 2021 1	Internacional	2–2	Sport	Porto Alegre
20:30 (UTC-3)	Edenílson 19' (pen.); Rodrigo Lindoso 44'	Report	Thiago Neves 62' (pen.); André Felipe 86'	Stadium: Estádio José Pinheiro Borda (Beira-Rio); Referee: Vinicius Gonçalves Dias Araujo

6 June 2021 2	Sport	0–1	Atlético Mineiro	Recife
20:30 (UTC-3)		Report	Hulk 14'	Stadium: Estádio Adelmar da Costa Carvalho (Ilha do Retiro); Referee: Raphael Claus

13 June 2021 3	Fortaleza	1–0	Sport	Fortaleza
20:30 (UTC-3)	Wellington Paulista 79' (pen.)	Report		Stadium: Estádio Governador Plácido Castelo (Castelão); Referee: Braulio da Silva Machado

17 June 2021 4	Sport	1–0	Grêmio	Recife
19:00 (UTC-3)	Sander 34'	Report		Stadium: Estádio Adelmar da Costa Carvalho (Ilha do Retiro); Referee: Denis da Silva Ribeiro Serafim

20 June 2021 5	Juventude	1–0	Sport	Caxias do Sul
20:30 (UTC-3)	Matheus Peixoto 83'	Report		Stadium: Estádio Alfredo Jaconi; Referee: Edina Alves Batista

24 June 2021 6	Corinthians	2–1	Sport	São Paulo
19:00 (UTC-3)	Iago Maidana 45+3' (o.g.); Jô 51'	Report	Tréllez 82'	Stadium: Neo Química Arena; Referee: Paulo Roberto Alves Junior

27 June 2021 7	Sport	0–0	Cuiabá	Recife
20:30 (UTC-3)		Report		Stadium: Estádio Adelmar da Costa Carvalho (Ilha do Retiro); Referee: Marielson Alves Silva

30 June 2021 8	Santos	0–0	Sport	Santos
20:30 (UTC-3)		Report		Stadium: Estádio Urbano Caldeira (Vila Belmiro); Referee: Douglas Schwengber da Silva

4 July 2021 9	Sport	0–1	Palmeiras	Recife
16:00 (UTC-3)		Report	Gustavo Scarpa 38'	Stadium: Estádio Adelmar da Costa Carvalho (Ilha do Retiro); Referee: Caio Max Augusto Vieira

7 July 2021 10	Atlético Goianiense	1–1	Sport	Goiânia
19:15 (UTC-3)	Arthur Gomes 51'	Report	Marcão 48'	Stadium: Estádio Antônio Accioly; Referee: Leo Simão Holanda

10 July 2021 11	Sport	1–2	Fluminense	Recife
19:00 (UTC-3)	André Felipe 42' (pen.)	Report	Lucca 66', 73'	Stadium: Estádio Adelmar da Costa Carvalho (Ilha do Retiro); Referee: Antonio Dib Moraes de Sousa

19 July 2021 12	América Mineiro	0–1	Sport	Belo Horizonte
20:00 (UTC-3)		Report	Paulinho Moccelin 86'	Stadium: Estádio Raimundo Sampaio (Independência); Referee: Vinicius Gomes do Amaral

25 July 2021 13	Sport	0–0	Ceará	Recife
20:30 (UTC-3)		Report		Stadium: Estádio Adelmar da Costa Carvalho (Ilha do Retiro); Referee: Vinicius Gonçalves Dias Araujo

1 August 2021 14	Bahia	0–1	Sport	Salvador
18:15 (UTC-3)		Report	Mikael 89'	Stadium: Estádio Governador Roberto Santos (Pituaçu); Referee: Jefferson Ferreira de Moraes

6 August 2021 15	Sport	0–0	Red Bull Bragantino	Recife
19:00 (UTC-3)		Report		Stadium: Estádio Adelmar da Costa Carvalho (Ilha do Retiro); Referee: Wagner do Nascimento Magalhaes

15 August 2021 16	Flamengo	2–0	Sport	Volta Redonda
16:00 (UTC-3)	Bruno Henrique 11'; Éverton Ribeiro 47' (o.g.)	Report		Stadium: Estádio Municipal General Sylvio Raulino de Oliveira; Referee: Raphael Claus

22 August 2021 17	Sport	0–1	São Paulo	Recife
20:30 (UTC-3)		Report	Pablo 4'	Stadium: Estádio Adelmar da Costa Carvalho (Ilha do Retiro); Referee: Paulo Roberto Alves Junior

28 August 2021 18	Sport	0–0	Chapecoense	Recife
17:00 (UTC-3)		Report		Stadium: Estádio Adelmar da Costa Carvalho (Ilha do Retiro); Referee: Jefferson Ferreira de Moraes

5 September 2021 19	Athletico Paranaense	0–0	Sport	Curitiba
18:15 (UTC-3)		Report		Stadium: Estádio Joaquim Américo Guimarães (Arena da Baixada); Referee: Denis da Silva Ribeiro Serafim

13 September 2021 20	Sport	0–1	Internacional	Recife
20:00 (UTC-3)		Report	Patrick 4'	Stadium: Estádio Adelmar da Costa Carvalho (Ilha do Retiro); Referee: Andre Luiz de Freitas Castro

18 September 2021 21	Atlético Mineiro	3–0	Sport	Belo Horizonte
19:00 (UTC-3)	Diego Costa 35'; Hulk 45+1'; Vargas 90+9' (pen.)	Report		Stadium: Estádio Governador Magalhães Pinto (Mineirão); Referee: Vinicius Gonçalves Dias Araujo

26 September 2021 22	Sport	0–1	Fortaleza	São Lourenço da Mata
18:15 (UTC-3)		Report	Marcelo Benevenuto 33'	Stadium: Estádio Governador Carlos Wilson Campos (Arena Pernambuco); Referee: Wagner do Nascimento Magalhães

3 October 2021 23	Grêmio	1–2	Sport	Porto Alegre
20:30 (UTC-3)	Douglas Costa 85'		Gustavo 53'; Mikael 70'	Stadium: Arena do Grêmio; Attendance: 7,147; Referee: Felipe Fernandes de Lima

6 October 2021 24	Sport	3–1	Juventude	São Lourenço da Mata
19:00 (UTC-3)	Zé Welison 36'; Mikael 49'; Chico 69'	Report	Paulinho Bóia 80' (pen.)	Stadium: Estádio Governador Carlos Wilson Campos (Arena Pernambuco); Referee: Bráulio da Silva Machado

9 October 2021 25	Sport	1–0	Corinthians	São Lourenço da Mata
16:30 (UTC-3)	Paulinho Moccelin 81'	Report		Stadium: Estádio Governador Carlos Wilson Campos (Arena Pernambuco); Referee: Savio Pereira Sampaio

14 October 2021 26	Cuiabá	1–0	Sport	Cuiabá
19:00 (UTC-3)	Élton 69' (pen.)	Report		Stadium: Arena Pantanal; Referee: Leandro Pedro Vuaden

17 October 2021 27	Sport	0–0	Santos	São Lourenço da Mata
20:30 (UTC-3)		Report		Stadium: Estádio Governador Carlos Wilson Campos (Arena Pernambuco); Attendance: 5,272; Referee: Anderson Daronco

25 October 2021 28	Palmeiras	2–1	Sport	São Paulo
21:30 (UTC-3)	Luiz Adriano 53'; Felipe Melo 81'	Report	Barcia 4'	Stadium: Allianz Parque; Attendance: 13,367; Referee: Wagner do Nascimento Magalhães

28 October 2021 29	Red Bull Bragantino	3–0	Sport	Bragança Paulista
19:00 (UTC-3)	Ytalo 3'; Chico 50' (o.g.); Cuello 87'	Report		Stadium: Estádio Nabi Abi Chedid; Referee: Bruno Arleu de Araújo

31 October 2021 30	Sport	2–0	Atlético Goianiense	São Lourenço da Mata
20:30 (UTC-3)	Mikael 76' (pen.)	Report		Stadium: Estádio Governador Carlos Wilson Campos (Arena Pernambuco); Referee: Luiz Flavio de Oliveira

6 November 2021 31	Fluminense	1–0	Sport	Rio de Janeiro
21:00 (UTC-3)	David Braz 90+6'	Report		Stadium: Estádio Jornalista Mário Filho (Maracanã); Referee: Jefferson Ferreira de Moraes

10 November 2021 32	Sport	2–3	América Mineiro	São Lourenço da Mata
21:30 (UTC-3)	Mikael 66'; Zé Welison 76'	Report	Alê 17'; Ademir 52'; Juninho Valoura 83'	Stadium: Estádio Governador Carlos Wilson Campos (Arena Pernambuco); Referee: Raphael Claus

14 November 2021 33	Ceará	2–1	Sport	Fortaleza
16:45 (UTC-3)	Vina 9'; Marlon 80'	Report	Mikael 61'	Stadium: Estádio Governador Plácido Castelo (Castelão); Attendance: 20,362; Referee: Marcelo de Lima Henrique

18 November 2021 34	Sport	1–0	Bahia	São Lourenço da Mata
21:00 (UTC-3)	Paulinho Moccelin 66'	Report		Stadium: Estádio Governador Carlos Wilson Campos (Arena Pernambuco); Referee: Flavio Rodrigues de Souza

27 November 2021 35	São Paulo	2–0	Sport	São Paulo
21:30 (UTC-3)	Calleri 50'; Gabriel Sara 80'	Report		Stadium: Estádio Cícero Pompeu de Toledo (Morumbi); Attendance: 35,679; Referee: Heber Roberto Lopes

3 December 2021 36	Sport	1–1	Flamengo	São Lourenço da Mata
20:00 (UTC-3)	Gustavo 50'	Report	Michael 39'	Stadium: Estádio Governador Carlos Wilson Campos (Arena Pernambuco); Referee: Leandro Pedro Vuaden

6 December 2021 37	Chapecoense	0–1	Sport	Chapecó
21:00 (UTC-3)		Report	Luciano Juba 87'	Stadium: Arena Condá; Referee: Paulo Cesar Zanovelli da Silva

9 December 2021 38	Sport	1–1	Athletico Paranaense	São Lourenço da Mata
21:30 (UTC-3)	Mikael 28'	Report	Khellven 42'	Stadium: Estádio Governador Carlos Wilson Campos (Arena Pernambuco); Referee: Ramon Abatti Abel

==== Record ====
Final Position	Points	Matches	Wins	Draws	Losses	Goals For	Goals Away	Win%
19th	38	38	9	11	18	24	37	23%
