= 2020 Sport Club do Recife season =

Sport Recife
2020 season
- Chairman: Milton Bivar
- Manager: Guto Ferreira; César Lucena (c); Daniel Paulista; Jair Ventura; Ricardo Pinto (c); Emilio Faro (c)
- Stadium: Ilha do Retiro
- Série A: 15th
- Pernambucano: 7th
- Copa do Nordeste: Quarter-final
- Copa do Brasil: First round
- Top goalscorer: League: Iago Maidana; Thiago Neves (6); All: Élton; Hernane; Iago Maidana; Leandro Barcia; Marquinhos (7)
Home colours	Away colours	Third colours

The 2020 season was Sport Recife's 116th season in the club's history. Sport competed in the Campeonato Pernambucano, Copa do Nordeste, Série A and Copa do Brasil.

== Final squad ==
=== First team ===
Note: Flags indicate national team as defined under FIFA eligibility rules; some limited exceptions apply. Players may hold more than one non-FIFA nationality.

No.	Pos.	Nation	Player
1	GK	BRA	Mailson
2	DF	BRA	Patric
3	DF	BRA	Júnior Tavares (on loan from São Paulo)
5	MF	BRA	Ronaldo Henrique
6	DF	BRA	Iago Maidana (on loan from Atlético Mineiro)
7	MF	BRA	Márcio Araújo
8	MF	BRA	Marcos Serrato
9	FW	BRA	Hernane
10	MF	ARG	Lucas Mugni
11	FW	URU	Leandro Barcia
12	DF	BRA	Sander (captain)
14	MF	BRA	Bruninho (on loan from Atlético Mineiro)
15	DF	BRA	Rafael Thyere (on loan from Grêmio)
16	MF	ARG	Jonathan Gómez
18	MF	BRA	Betinho (on loan from Tombense)
19	FW	BRA	Vinícius Popó (on loan from Cruzeiro)
20	MF	BRA	Ricardinho

No.	Pos.	Nation	Player
23	DF	BRA	Raul Prata
27	GK	BRA	Luan Polli
28	MF	BRA	João Igor
30	MF	BRA	Thiago Neves
33	FW	BRA	Marquinhos (on loan from Corinthians)
34	DF	BRA	Adryelson
40	FW	BRA	Maxwell (on loan from Corinthians)
44	DF	BRA	Chico
46	DF	BRA	Luciano Juba
48	MF	BRA	Alê Santos
49	GK	BRA	Túlio
77	MF	BRA	Marcão
92	GK	BRA	Carlos Eduardo
94	FW	BRA	Dalberto
95	FW	BRA	Lucas Venuto (on loan from Santos)
99	FW	BRA	Mikael

=== Reserve team ===
Note: Flags indicate national team as defined under FIFA eligibility rules; some limited exceptions apply. Players may hold more than one non-FIFA nationality.

No.	Pos.	Nation	Player
43	DF	BRA	Pedrão
50	MF	BRA	Italo
52	FW	BRA	Adson
53	FW	BRA	Danrlley

No.	Pos.	Nation	Player
55	FW	BRA	Douglas
56	GK	BRA	Antônio Adriano
66	DF	BRA	Ewerthon

== Statistics ==
=== Overall ===
Games played	60 (12 Pernambucano, 9 Copa do Nordeste, 1 Copa do Brasil, 38 Série A)
Games won	19 (5 Pernambucano, 2 Copa do Nordeste, 0 Copa do Brasil, 12 Série A)
Games drawn	16 (5 Pernambucano, 5 Copa do Nordeste, 0 Copa do Brasil, 6 Série A)
Games lost	25 (2 Pernambucano, 2 Copa do Nordeste, 1 Copa do Brasil, 20 Série A)
Goals scored	59
Goals conceded	68
Goal difference	–9
Best results (goal difference)	5–0 (H) v Petrolina - Pernambucano - 2020.08.05
Worst result (goal difference)	0–3 (A) v Flamengo - Série A - 2020.10.07; 0–3 (A) v Corinthians - Série A - 2021.01.21; 0–3 (H) v Flamengo - Série A - 2021.02.01
Top scorer	Élton, Hernane, Iago Maidana, Leandro Barcia and Marquinhos (7)

Source: Sport Recife official website

=== Goalscorers ===
Place	Pos.	Nat.	No.	Name	Campeonato Pernambucano	Copa do Nordeste	Copa do Brasil	Série A	Total
1	FW	(Brazil)	19	Élton	3	2	0	2	7
=	FW	(Brazil)	9	Hernane	4	1	0	2	7
=	DF	(Brazil)	6	Iago Maidana	1	0	0	6	7
=	FW	(Uruguay)	11	Leandro Barcia	2	1	1	3	7
=	MF	(Brazil)	33	Marquinhos	2	2	0	3	7
2	MF	(Brazil)	30	Thiago Neves	0	0	0	6	6
3	FW	(Brazil)	94	Dalberto	0	0	0	3	3
4	MF	(Argentina)	10	Lucas Mugni	0	1	0	1	2
=	MF	(Brazil)	77	Marcão	0	0	0	2	2
=	FW	(Brazil)	5	Ronaldo Henrique	2	0	0	0	2
5	MF	(Brazil)	18	Betinho	1	0	0	0	1
=	MF	(Brazil)	79	Ewandro	1	0	0	0	1
=	MF	(Brazil)	13	Jean Patrick	0	1	0	0	1
=	MF	(Argentina)	16	Jonathan Gómez	0	0	0	1	1
=	FW	(Brazil)	37	Juninho	1	0	0	0	1
=	FW	(Brazil)	99	Mikael	0	0	0	1	1
=	DF	(Brazil)	2	Patric	0	0	0	1	1
=	MF	(Brazil)	20	Yan Matheus	1	0	0	0	1
				Own goals	1	0	0	0	1
				Total	19	8	1	31	59

=== Managers performance ===
Name	From	To	P	W	D	L	GF	GA	Avg%	Ref
(Brazil) Guto Ferreira	19 January 2020	12 February 2020	9	2	6	1	9	8	44%	
(Brazil) César Lucena (c)	15 February 2020	28 November 2020	2	0	0	2	2	6	0%	
(Brazil) Daniel Paulista	22 February 2020	23 August 2020	17	6	5	6	23	15	45%	
(Brazil) Jair Ventura	30 August 2020	25 February 2021	30	11	4	15	25	38	41%	
(Brazil) Ricardo Pinto (c)	23 November 2020	23 November 2020	1	0	0	1	0	1	0%	
(Brazil) Emilio Faro (c)	15 February 2021	15 February 2021	1	0	1	0	0	0	0%	

(c) Indicates the caretaker manager

=== Home record ===
Recife	São Lourenço da Mata
Ilha do Retiro	Arena Pernambuco
Capacity: 32,983	Capacity: 44,300
26 matches (12 wins 4 draws 10 losses)	3 matches (1 win 2 draws)

=== Overview ===
Competition	First match	Last match	Starting round	Final position	Record							
Competition	First match	Last match	Starting round	Final position	Pld	W	D	L	GF	GA	GD	Win %
Série A	8 August	25 February 2021	Matchday 1	15th	38	12	6	20	31	50	−19	31.58
Pernambucano	19 January	5 August	First stage	7th	12	5	5	2	19	7	+12	41.67
Copa do Nordeste	25 January	25 July	Group stage	8th	9	2	5	2	8	9	−1	22.22
Copa do Brasil	12 February	12 February	First round	67th	1	0	0	1	1	2	−1	0.00
Total					60	19	16	25	59	68	−9	31.67

Source: Competitions

== Competitions ==
=== Campeonato Pernambucano ===
==== First stage ====
19 January 2020 1	Náutico	1–1	Sport	Recife
16:00 (UTC-3)	Chico 62' (o.g.)	Report	Salatiel 45' (o.g.)	Stadium: Estádio Eládio de Barros Carvalho (Aflitos); Attendance: 7,270; Referee: Michelangelo Almeida Júnior

22 January 2020 2	Sport	1–1	Vitória das Tabocas	São Lourenço da Mata
21:30 (UTC-3)	Juninho 12'	Report	Everson 74'	Stadium: Estádio Governador Carlos Wilson Campos (Arena Pernambuco); Attendance: 3,448; Referee: Tiago Nascimento dos Santos

28 January 2020 3	Sport	1–0	Central	São Lourenço da Mata
20:00 (UTC-3)	Ewandro 32'	Report		Stadium: Estádio Governador Carlos Wilson Campos (Arena Pernambuco); Referee: Diego Fernando Silva de Lima

4 February 2020 4	Sport	1–1	Retrô	Recife
19:15 (UTC-3)	Hernane 12'	Report	Héricles 38'	Stadium: Estádio Adelmar da Costa Carvalho (Ilha do Retiro); Referee: José Woshington da Silva

9 February 2020 5	Decisão	0–0	Sport	Caruaru
16:00 (UTC-3)		Report		Stadium: Estádio Luiz José de Lacerda; Referee: Nairon Pereira de Lira

26 February 2020 6	Salgueiro	2–1	Sport	Salgueiro
20:00 (UTC-3)	Muller 43' (pen.); Renato Henrique 79'	Report	Barcia 39'	Stadium: Estádio Cornélio de Barros; Attendance: 1,642; Referee: Tiago Nascimento dos Santos

29 February 2020 7	Sport	4–0	Afogados da Ingazeira	Recife
16:00 (UTC-3)	Hernane 12' (pen.), 63' (pen.); Marquinhos 23'; Yan Matheus 69'	Report		Stadium: Estádio Adelmar da Costa Carvalho (Ilha do Retiro); Referee: Cesar Pereira Leite

4 March 2020 8	Petrolina	0–0	Sport	Petrolina
20:00 (UTC-3)		Report		Stadium: Estádio Paulo de Souza Coelho; Referee: Rodrigo Jose Pereira de Lima

19 July 2020 9	Sport	1–2	Santa Cruz	Recife
16:00 (UTC-3)	Hernane 65'	Report	Pipico 41', 90+5'	Stadium: Estádio Adelmar da Costa Carvalho (Ilha do Retiro); Referee: Diego Fernando Silva de Lima

==== Relegation stage ====
29 July 2020 1	Sport	1–0	Vitória das Tabocas	Recife
16:00 (UTC-3)	Marquinhos 79'	Report		Stadium: Estádio Adelmar da Costa Carvalho (Ilha do Retiro); Referee: Tiago Nascimento dos Santos

1 August 2020 2	Decisão	0–3	Sport	Caruaru
16:00 (UTC-3)		Report	Barcia 9'; Betinho 15'; Élton 43'	Stadium: Estádio Antônio Inácio de Souza; Referee: Nairon Pereira de Lira

5 August 2020 3	Sport	5–0	Petrolina	Recife
16:00 (UTC-3)	Iago Maidana 34' (pen.); Élton 70' (pen.), 84'; Ronaldo Henrique 75', 87'	Report		Stadium: Estádio Adelmar da Costa Carvalho (Ilha do Retiro); Referee: Paulo Belence Alves dos Prazeres Filho

==== Record ====
Final Position	Points	Matches	Wins	Draws	Losses	Goals For	Goals Away	Win%
7th	20	12	5	5	2	19	7	41%

=== Copa do Nordeste ===
==== Group stage ====
25 January 2020 1	CSA	0–1	Sport	Maceió
18:00 (UTC-3)		Report	Barcia 49'	Stadium: Estádio Rei Pelé; Referee: Zandick Gondim Alves Junior

1 February 2020 2	Sport	1–1	Vitória	São Lourenço da Mata
16:00 (UTC-3)	Mugni 73'	Report	Guilherme Rend 56'	Stadium: Estádio Governador Carlos Wilson Campos (Arena Pernambuco); Referee: Marcelo Aparecido Ribeiro de Souza

6 February 2020 3	Sport	2–2	Imperatriz	Recife
20:00 (UTC-3)	Élton 16'; Jean Patrick 79'	Report	Cesinha 87', 89'	Stadium: Estádio Adelmar da Costa Carvalho (Ilha do Retiro); Referee: Diego da Silva Castro

15 February 2020 4	Náutico	2–0	Sport	Recife
18:00 (UTC-3)	Ronaldo Alves 8'; Jean Carlos 76'	Report		Stadium: Estádio Eládio de Barros Carvalho (Aflitos); Referee: Wagner Reway

22 February 2020 5	América–RN	1–1	Sport	Natal
18:00 (UTC-3)	Tiago Orobó 47'	Report	Hernane 90+1'	Stadium: Arena das Dunas; Referee: Denis da Silva Ribeiro Serafim

7 March 2020 6	Sport	1–0	Santa Cruz	Recife
16:00 (UTC-3)	Élton 78'	Report		Stadium: Estádio Adelmar da Costa Carvalho (Ilha do Retiro); Referee: Diego Pombo Lopez

15 March 2020 7	Ceará	2–1	Sport	Fortaleza
15:30 (UTC-3)	Felipe 58'; Ricardinho 85'	Report	Marquinhos 36'	Stadium: Estádio Governador Plácido Castelo (Castelão); Referee: Marcelo Aparecido Ribeiro de Souza

22 July 2020 8	Sport	1–1	Confiança	Feira de Santana
20:00 (UTC-3)	Marquinhos 74'	Report	Nirley 86'	Stadium: Estádio Jodilton Souza (Arena Cajueiro); Referee: Antonio Dib Moraes de Sousa

==== Quarter-final ====
25 July 2020	Fortaleza	0–0 (4–1 p)	Sport	Salvador
16:00 (UTC-3)		Report		Stadium: Estádio Manoel Barradas (Barradão); Referee: Diego Pombo Lopez
	Penalties
	Juninho (penalty scored); Bruno Melo (penalty scored); Marlon (penalty scored); Edson Cariús (penalty scored)		(penalty missed) Leandro Barcia; (penalty missed) Patric; (penalty scored) Iago Maidana

==== Record ====
Final Position	Points	Matches	Wins	Draws	Losses	Goals For	Goals Away	Win%
8th	11	9	2	5	2	8	9	22%

=== Copa do Brasil ===
==== First round ====
12 February 2020	Brusque	2–1	Sport	Brusque
19:15 (UTC-3)	Edu 23'; Ianson 82'	Report	Barcia 35'	Stadium: Estádio Augusto Bauer; Referee: Douglas Marques das Flores

==== Record ====
Final Position	Points	Matches	Wins	Draws	Losses	Goals For	Goals Away	Win%
67th	0	1	0	0	1	1	2	0%

=== Série A ===
8 August 2020 1	Sport	3–2	Ceará	Recife
21:00 (UTC-3)	Élton 20', 33'; Gómez 42'	Report	Cléber 35'; Vítor Jacaré 56'	Stadium: Estádio Adelmar da Costa Carvalho (Ilha do Retiro); Referee: Edina Alves Batista

13 August 2020 2	Vasco da Gama	2–0	Sport	Rio de Janeiro
20:00 (UTC-3)	Fellipe Bastos 8', 32'	Report		Stadium: Estádio Vasco da Gama (São Januário); Referee: Rodolpho Toski Marques

16 August 2020 3	Atlético Goianiense	1–1	Sport	Goiânia
19:00 (UTC-3)	Jorginho 13'	Report	Iago Maidana 90+3'	Stadium: Estádio Olímpico Pedro Ludovico; Referee: Grazianni Maciel Rocha

20 August 2020 4	Sport	0–1	Santos	Recife
19:15 (UTC-3)		Report	Marinho 75'	Stadium: Estádio Adelmar da Costa Carvalho (Ilha do Retiro); Referee: José Mendonça da Silva Junior

23 August 2020 5	Sport	0–1	São Paulo	Recife
19:00 (UTC-3)		Report	Pablo 5'	Stadium: Estádio Adelmar da Costa Carvalho (Ilha do Retiro); Referee: Rodrigo Dalonso Ferreira

30 August 2020 6	Coritiba	1–0	Sport	Curitiba
16:00 (UTC-3)	Sabino 90+4'	Report		Stadium: Estádio Major Antônio (Couto Pereira); Referee: Raphael Claus

3 September 2020 7	Grêmio	1–2	Sport	Porto Alegre
19:00 (UTC-3)	Pepê 77'	Report	Patric 5'; Iago Maidana 73'	Stadium: Arena do Grêmio; Referee: Dyorgines Jose Padovani de Andrade

6 September 2020 8	Sport	2–1	Goiás	Recife
20:30 (UTC-3)	Barcia 59'; Marquinhos 76'	Report	Élton 67' (o.g.)	Stadium: Estádio Adelmar da Costa Carvalho (Ilha do Retiro); Referee: Vinicius Gomes do Amaral

9 September 2020 9	Fortaleza	1–0	Sport	Fortaleza
18:00 (UTC-3)	Wellington Paulista 53'	Report		Stadium: Estádio Governador Plácido Castelo (Castelão); Referee: Felipe Fernandes de Lima

13 September 2020 10	Palmeiras	2–2	Sport	São Paulo
19:45 (UTC-3)	Willian 28'; Zé Rafael 41'	Report	Iago Maidana 12'; Mugni 18'	Stadium: Allianz Parque; Referee: Diego Pombo Lopez

20 September 2020 11	Sport	1–0	Fluminense	Recife
20:30 (UTC-3)	Hernane 12'	Report		Stadium: Estádio Adelmar da Costa Carvalho (Ilha do Retiro); Referee: Leandro Pedro Vuaden

23 September 2020 12	Sport	1–0	Corinthians	Recife
21:30 (UTC-3)	Iago Maidana 36'	Report		Stadium: Estádio Adelmar da Costa Carvalho (Ilha do Retiro); Referee: Wilton Pereira Sampaio

4 October 2020 13	Bahia	1–2	Sport	Salvador
18:15 (UTC-3)	Matheus Saldanha 76'	Report	Hernane 40'; Marcão 54'	Stadium: Estádio Governador Roberto Santos (Pituaçu); Referee: Rafael Traci

7 October 2020 14	Flamengo	3–0	Sport	Rio de Janeiro
19:15 (UTC-3)	Pedro 51', 60'; Gustavo Henrique 54'	Report		Stadium: Estádio Jornalista Mário Filho (Maracanã); Referee: Caio Max Augusto Vieira

11 October 2020 15	Sport	1–2	Botafogo	Recife
18:15 (UTC-3)	Thiago Neves 55'	Report	Honda 29'; Caio Alexandre 45'	Stadium: Estádio Adelmar da Costa Carvalho (Ilha do Retiro); Referee: Rodrigo Dalonso Ferreira

14 October 2020 16	Sport	3–5	Internacional	Recife
21:30 (UTC-3)	Marquinhos 43'; Barcia 55'; Mikael 90'	Report	Patrick 34', 75'; Adryelson 39' (o.g.); Rodrigo Moledo 52'; Yuri Alberto 80'	Stadium: Estádio Adelmar da Costa Carvalho (Ilha do Retiro); Referee: Wagner do Nascimento Magalhaes

18 October 2020 17	Red Bull Bragantino	2–0	Sport	Bragança Paulista
20:30 (UTC-3)	Ricardo 50'; Claudinho 60'	Report		Stadium: Estádio Nabi Abi Chedid; Referee: Ricardo Marques Ribeiro

24 October 2020 18	Atlético Mineiro	0–0	Sport	Belo Horizonte
21:00 (UTC-3)		Report		Stadium: Estádio Governador Magalhães Pinto (Mineirão); Referee: Paulo Roberto Alves Junior

1 November 2020 19	Sport	1–0	Athletico Paranaense	Recife
16:00 (UTC-3)	Thiago Neves 52'	Report		Stadium: Estádio Adelmar da Costa Carvalho (Ilha do Retiro); Referee: Jefferson Ferreira de Moraes

8 November 2020 20	Ceará	0–0	Sport	Fortaleza
20:30 (UTC-3)		Report		Stadium: Estádio Governador Plácido Castelo (Castelão); Referee: Ricardo Marques Ribeiro

14 November 2020 21	Sport	0–2	Vasco da Gama	Recife
16:30 (UTC-3)		Report	Cano 25', 51'	Stadium: Estádio Adelmar da Costa Carvalho (Ilha do Retiro); Referee: Heber Roberto Lopes

23 November 2020 22	Sport	0–1	Atlético Goianiense	Recife
20:00 (UTC-3)		Report	Janderson 60'	Stadium: Estádio Adelmar da Costa Carvalho (Ilha do Retiro); Referee: Edina Alves Batista

28 November 2020 23	Santos	4–2	Sport	Santos
17:00 (UTC-3)	Marinho 6'; Lucas Braga 12'; Bruno Marques 70'; Soteldo 81'	Report	Barcia 27'; Marquinhos 45'	Stadium: Estádio Urbano Caldeira (Vila Belmiro); Referee: Wilton Pereira Sampaio

6 December 2020 24	São Paulo	1–0	Sport	São Paulo
16:00 (UTC-3)	Luciano 13'	Report		Stadium: Estádio Cícero Pompeu de Toledo (Morumbi); Referee: Felipe Fernandes de Lima

13 December 2020 25	Sport	1–0	Coritiba	Recife
18:15 (UTC-3)	Thiago Neves 37'	Report		Stadium: Estádio Adelmar da Costa Carvalho (Ilha do Retiro); Referee: Marcelo de Lima Henrique

19 December 2020 26	Sport	1–1	Grêmio	Recife
19:00 (UTC-3)	Dalberto 9'	Report	Pepê 72'	Stadium: Estádio Adelmar da Costa Carvalho (Ilha do Retiro); Referee: José Mendonça da Silva Junior

26 December 2020 27	Goiás	1–0	Sport	Goiânia
19:00 (UTC-3)	Fernandão 4'	Report		Stadium: Estádio Hailé Pinheiro (Serrinha); Referee: Braulio da Silva Machado

6 January 2021 28	Sport	1–0	Fortaleza	Recife
20:30 (UTC-3)	Thiago Neves 9'	Report		Stadium: Estádio Adelmar da Costa Carvalho (Ilha do Retiro); Referee: Raphael Claus

9 January 2021 29	Sport	0–1	Palmeiras	Recife
19:00 (UTC-3)		Report	Willian 27'	Stadium: Estádio Adelmar da Costa Carvalho (Ilha do Retiro); Referee: Dyorgines Jose Padovani de Andrade

16 January 2021 30	Fluminense	1–0	Sport	Rio de Janeiro
19:00 (UTC-3)	Patric 4' (o.g.)	Report		Stadium: Estádio Olímpico Nilton Santos (Engenhão); Referee: Heber Roberto Lopes

21 January 2021 31	Corinthians	3–0	Sport	São Paulo
21:00 (UTC-3)	Gustavo Mosquito 33'; Mateus Vital 47'; Jô 79'	Report		Stadium: Neo Química Arena; Referee: Anderson Daronco

24 January 2021 32	Sport	2–0	Bahia	Recife
18:15 (UTC-3)	Thiago Neves 72'; Iago Maidana 85'	Report		Stadium: Estádio Adelmar da Costa Carvalho (Ilha do Retiro); Referee: Raphael Claus

1 February 2021 33	Sport	0–3	Flamengo	Recife
20:00 (UTC-3)		Report	Gabriel Barbosa 3'; Bruno Henrique 18'; Pedro 90+5'	Stadium: Estádio Adelmar da Costa Carvalho (Ilha do Retiro); Referee: Rafael Traci

5 February 2021 34	Botafogo	0–1	Sport	Rio de Janeiro
20:00 (UTC-3)		Report	Iago Maidana 24'	Stadium: Estádio Olímpico Nilton Santos (Engenhão); Referee: Luiz Flavio de Oliveira

10 February 2021 35	Internacional	1–2	Sport	Porto Alegre
19:00 (UTC-3)	Patrick 40'	Report	Marcão 36'; Dalberto 45+4'	Stadium: Estádio José Pinheiro Borda (Beira-Rio); Referee: Rodolpho Toski Marques

15 February 2021 36	Sport	0–0	Red Bull Bragantino	Recife
20:00 (UTC-3)		Report		Stadium: Estádio Adelmar da Costa Carvalho (Ilha do Retiro); Referee: Leandro Pedro Vuaden

21 February 2021 37	Sport	2–3	Atlético Mineiro	Recife
16:00 (UTC-3)	Dalberto 32'; Thiago Neves 86'	Report	Jair 6'; Rafael Thyere 49' (o.g.); Marrony 90+8'	Stadium: Estádio Adelmar da Costa Carvalho (Ilha do Retiro); Referee: Rodolpho Toski Marques

25 February 2021 38	Athletico Paranaense	2–0	Sport	Curitiba
21:30 (UTC-3)	Nikão 7'; Léo Cittadini 85'	Report		Stadium: Estádio Joaquim Américo Guimarães (Arena da Baixada); Referee: Flavio Rodrigues de Souza

==== Record ====
Final Position	Points	Matches	Wins	Draws	Losses	Goals For	Goals Away	Win%
15th	42	38	12	6	20	31	50	31%
