= 2026 Campeonato Alagoano =

Campeonato Alagoano
- Season: 2026
- Dates: 10 January – 7 March
- Champions: CRB
- Relegated: CSE
- Copa do Brasil: ASA; CRB; CSA; CSE (via Copa Alagoas)
- Série D: ASA; CSA
- Copa do Nordeste: ASA; CRB
- Matches: 34
- Goals: 70 (2.06 per match)

The 2026 Campeonato Alagoano (officially the Alagoano SportyBet 2026 for sponsorship reasons) was the 96th edition of the top football league in Alagoas organized by FAF. It began on 10 January and ended on 7 March 2026. CRB were the defending champions.

== Format ==
In the first stage, each team played the other seven teams in a single round-robin tournament. Top four teams advanced to the semi-finals, while the bottom team was relegated to the 2027 Campeonato Alagoano Série B. Semi-finals and finals will be played on a home-and-away two-legged basis with the best overall performance team hosting the second leg. If tied on aggregate, the penalty shoot-out will be used to determine the winners.

Champions and runners-up will qualify for the 2027 Copa do Brasil and 2027 Copa do Nordeste. The third-place team will also qualify for the 2027 Copa do Brasil. The two best teams not already qualified for the 2027 Série A, Série B or Série C will qualify for the 2027 Campeonato Brasileiro Série D.

== Teams ==
Club	Home city	Manager
ASA	Arapiraca	Dico Woolley
Coruripe	Coruripe	Júnior Amorim
CRB	Maceió	Eduardo Barroca
Cruzeiro de Arapiraca	Arapiraca	Luiz Gustavo
CSA	Maceió	Itamar Schülle
CSE	Palmeira dos Índios	Leandro Campos
Murici SC	Murici	Gabriel Teixeira
Penedense	Penedo	Bebeto Moraes

Murici FC declined to participate in the 2026 Campeonato Alagoano. The 2025 Série B runners-up, Esporte Clube Guarany Alagoano, replaced them and changed their name to Murici Sport Clube. They played their home matches in Murici.

== First stage ==
Pos	Team	Pld	W	D	L	GF	GA	GD	Pts	Qualification or relegation
1	ASA	7	5	2	0	13	3	+10	17	Advance to semi-finals
2	CSA	7	5	2	0	10	1	+9	17	Advance to semi-finals
3	CRB	7	4	1	2	8	8	0	13	Advance to semi-finals
4	Murici SC	7	3	2	2	8	5	+3	11	Advance to semi-finals
5	Cruzeiro de Arapiraca	7	2	0	5	6	12	−6	6	
6	Coruripe	7	1	2	4	5	11	−6	5	
7	Penedense	7	1	2	4	2	8	−6	5	
8	CSE	7	1	1	5	6	10	−4	4	Relegated to 2027 Campeonato Alagoano Série B

Source: FAF
Rules for classification: 1) Points; 2) Wins; 3) Goal difference; 4) Goals scored; 5) Head-to-head result (only between 2 teams); 6) Fewest red cards; 7) Fewest yellow cards; 8) Draw.

== Final stages ==
=== Bracket ===
Semi-finals
CRB	2	2	4
CSA	0	0	0
Murici SC	0	0	0
ASA	0	3	3

Finals
CRB	3	1	4
ASA	0	1	1

=== Semi-finals ===
Team 1	Agg.	Team 2	1st leg	2nd leg
Murici SC	0–3	ASA	0–0	0–3
CRB	4–0	CSA	2–0	2–0

==== Matches ====
14 February 2026
16:00

Murici SC	0–0	ASA

Estádio José Gomes da Costa, Murici
Referee: Rodrigo José Pereira de Lima (Pernambuco)

22 February 2026
16:00

ASA	3–0	Murici SC
Alex Bruno 6'; Higor Leite 26'; Jailson 58'

Estádio Municipal Coaracy da Mata Fonseca, Arapiraca
Referee: Bruno Arleu de Araújo (Rio de Janeiro)

ASA qualified for the 2027 Copa do Brasil and the 2027 Copa do Nordeste

18 February 2026
20:00

CRB	2–0	CSA
Mikael 51'; Crystopher Ribeiro 90'

Estádio Rei Pelé, Maceió
Referee: Ramon Abatti (Santa Catarina)

21 February 2026
16:00

CSA	0–2	CRB
		Douglas Baggio 21' (pen.); Vinícius Barata 67'

Estádio Rei Pelé, Maceió
Referee: Wilton Sampaio (Goiás)

CRB qualified for the 2027 Copa do Brasil and the 2027 Copa do Nordeste

=== Finals ===
28 February 2026
16:00

CRB	3–0	ASA
Mikael 27', 65'; Douglas Baggio 58' (pen.)

Estádio Rei Pelé, Maceió
Referee: Raphael Claus (São Paulo)

CRB	ASA

GK	12	(Brazil) Matheus Albino
DF	32	(Brazil) Hereda		(substituted off) 83'
DF	22	(Brazil) Bressan
DF	27	(Brazil) Fábio Alemão (c)
DF	36	(Brazil) Lucas Lovat
MF	8	(Brazil) Crystopher Ribeiro
MF	21	(Brazil) Pedro Castro		(substituted off) 71'
MF	10	(Brazil) Daniel		(substituted off) 87'
FW	7	(Brazil) Douglas Baggio		(substituted off) 71'
FW	97	(Brazil) Dadá Belmonte	(yellow card) 90+4'
FW	28	(Brazil) Mikael		(substituted off) 83'
Substitutes:
GK	1	(Brazil) Vitor Caetano
DF	14	(Brazil) Lyncon
DF	42	(Brazil) Weverton
DF	77	(Brazil) Léo Campos
DF	82	(Brazil) Wallace		(substituted on) 83'
MF	16	(Brazil) David Braw
MF	18	(Brazil) Geovane		(substituted on) 87'
MF	50	(Brazil) Luizão		(substituted on) 71'
FW	9	(Brazil) João Neto		(substituted on) 83'
FW	11	(Brazil) Guilherme Pato
FW	19	(Brazil) Luiz Phellype
FW	20	(Brazil) Vinícius Barata		(substituted on) 71'
Coach:
(Brazil) Eduardo Barroca

GK	12	(Brazil) Cris
DF	22	(Brazil) Paulinho		(substituted off) 60'
DF	4	(Brazil) Cristian Lucca (c)	(yellow card) 51'
DF	14	(Brazil) Flávio Nunes		(substituted off) 67'
DF	5	(Brazil) Fábio Aguiar
DF	16	(Brazil) Arthurzinho		(substituted off) 83'
MF	19	(Brazil) Léo Carvalho		(substituted off) 68'
MF	8	(Brazil) Allef
MF	26	(Brazil) Sammuel
FW	29	(Brazil) Gustavo Ramos		(substituted off) 60'
FW	9	(Brazil) Alex Bruno
Substitutes:
GK	1	(Brazil) Dida
DF	2	(Brazil) Léo Príncipe		(substituted on) 60'
DF	6	(Brazil) Ailton Silva
DF	15	(Brazil) Roni Lobo
DF	18	(Brazil) Filipe Ramon		(substituted on) 83'
MF	10	(Brazil) Higor Leite
MF	20	(Brazil) Léo Bahia	(red card) 56'
MF	27	(Brazil) Jailson		(substituted on) 67'
MF	28	(Brazil) Vini Locatelli
FW	7	(Brazil) Keliton		(substituted on) 68'
FW	11	(Brazil) Wandson		(substituted on) 60'
FW	21	(Brazil) Iago
Coach:
(Brazil) Dico Woolley

Assistant referees:
Guilherme Dias Camilo (Minas Gerais)
Márcia Bezerra Lopes Caetano (Rondônia)
Fourth official:
Denis da Silva Ribeiro Serafim
Video assistant referee:
Pablo Ramon Gonçalves Pinheiro (Rio Grande do Norte)
Assistant video assistant referees:
Brígida Cirilo Ferreira

7 March 2026
16:00

ASA	1–1	CRB
Fábio Aguiar 44'		Mikael 28'

Estádio Municipal Coaracy da Mata Fonseca, Arapiraca
Referee: Davi de Oliveira Lacerda (Espírito Santo)

ASA	CRB

GK	12	(Brazil) Cris
DF	22	(Brazil) Paulinho
DF	4	(Brazil) Cristian Lucca (c)
DF	5	(Brazil) Fábio Aguiar
DF	16	(Brazil) Arthurzinho		(substituted off) 76'
MF	19	(Brazil) Léo Carvalho		(substituted off) 46'
MF	8	(Brazil) Allef		(substituted off) 65'
MF	10	(Brazil) Higor Leite		(substituted off) 46'
MF	26	(Brazil) Sammuel	(yellow card) 31'
FW	29	(Brazil) Gustavo Ramos		(substituted off) 67'
FW	9	(Brazil) Alex Bruno
Substitutes:
GK	1	(Brazil) Dida
DF	2	(Brazil) Léo Príncipe
DF	6	(Brazil) Ailton Silva
DF	14	(Brazil) Flávio Nunes
DF	15	(Brazil) Roni Lobo
DF	18	(Brazil) Filipe Ramon		(substituted on) 76'
MF	27	(Brazil) Jailson		(substituted on) 46'
MF	28	(Brazil) Vini Locatelli		(substituted on) 65'
FW	7	(Brazil) Keliton		(substituted on) 46'
FW	11	(Brazil) Wandson		(substituted on) 67'
FW	17	(Brazil) Dudu
FW	21	(Brazil) Iago
Coach:
(Brazil) Itamar Schülle

GK	12	(Brazil) Matheus Albino
DF	32	(Brazil) Hereda
DF	22	(Brazil) Bressan
DF	27	(Brazil) Fábio Alemão (c)
DF	36	(Brazil) Lucas Lovat	(yellow card) 14' (yellow-red card) 57'
MF	8	(Brazil) Crystopher Ribeiro
MF	21	(Brazil) Pedro Castro		(substituted off) 78'
MF	10	(Brazil) Daniel		(substituted off) 67'
FW	7	(Brazil) Douglas Baggio		(substituted off) 56'
FW	97	(Brazil) Dadá Belmonte		(substituted off) 79'
FW	28	(Brazil) Mikael		(substituted off) 66'
Substitutes:
GK	1	(Brazil) Vitor Caetano
DF	14	(Brazil) Lyncon
DF	42	(Brazil) Weverton
DF	82	(Brazil) Wallace		(substituted on) 78'
DF	77	(Brazil) Léo Campos		(substituted on) 79'
MF	18	(Brazil) Geovane
MF	50	(Brazil) Luizão		(substituted on) 67'
FW	9	(Brazil) João Neto		(substituted on) 66'
FW	11	(Brazil) Guilherme Pato
FW	17	(Brazil) Thiaguinho
FW	19	(Brazil) Luiz Phellype
FW	20	(Brazil) Vinícius Barata		(substituted on) 56'
Coach:
(Brazil) Eduardo Barroca

Assistant referees:
Alessandro Alvaro Rocha de Matos (Bahia)
Thiago Henrique Neto Corrêa Farinha (Rio de Janeiro)
Fourth official:
Wiomar Santana de Oliveira
Video assistant referee:
Daniel Nobre Bins (Rio Grande do Sul)
Assistant video assistant referees:
Ruan Luiz de Barros

== Overall table ==
Pos	Team	Pld	W	D	L	GF	GA	GD	Pts	Qualification or relegation
1	CRB	11	7	2	2	16	9	+7	23	Champions and 2027 Copa do Brasil
2	ASA	11	6	4	1	17	7	+10	22	Runners-up, 2027 Copa do Brasil and 2027 Série D
3	CSA	9	5	2	2	10	5	+5	17	2027 Copa do Brasil and 2027 Série D
4	Murici SC	9	3	3	3	8	8	0	12	
5	Cruzeiro de Arapiraca	7	2	0	5	6	12	−6	6	
6	Coruripe	7	1	2	4	5	11	−6	5	
7	Penedense	7	1	2	4	2	8	−6	5	
8	CSE	7	1	1	5	6	10	−4	4	Relegation to the 2027 Campeonato Alagoano Série B (Note: CSE qualified for the 2027 Copa do Brasil by securing third place in the 2026 Copa Alagoas.)

Source: FAF
Rules for classification: 1) Points; 2) Wins; 3) Goal difference; 4) Goals scored; 5) Head-to-head result (only between 2 teams); 6) Fewest red cards; 7) Fewest yellow cards; 8) Draw.
