= List of Sport Club do Recife managers =

The following is a list of Sport Club do Recife managers.

- (Uruguay) Ricardo Diéz (1941)
- (Brazil) Cilinho (1973–74)
- (Brazil) Duque (1975)
- (Brazil) Ênio Andrade (1978)
- (Brazil) Barbatana (1981)
- (Brazil) Givanildo Oliveira (1983–84)
- (Brazil) Mário Juliato (1984)
- (Brazil) Carlos Alberto Silva (1985–86)
- (Brazil) Ênio Andrade (1986)
- (Brazil) Jair Picerni (1987)
- (Brazil) Émerson Leão (1987–88)
- (Brazil) Antônio Lopes (1988)
- (Brazil) Givanildo Oliveira (1991–92)
- (Brazil) Gílson Nunes (1993)
- (Brazil) Givanildo Oliveira (1994–95)
- (Brazil) Hélio dos Anjos (1996–97)
- (Brazil) Mauro Fernandes (1998)
- (Brazil) Ricardo Gomes (Jan 1, 1999 – June 30, 1999)
- (Brazil) Júlio César Leal (Feb 1, 1999 – June 30, 1999)
- (Brazil) Émerson Leão (2000)
- (Brazil) Jair Pereira (2001)
- (Brazil) Hélio dos Anjos (2003–04)
- (Brazil) Heriberto da Cunha (June 23, 2004 – Feb 1, 2005)
- (Brazil) Adilson Batista (Feb 5, 2005 – April 4, 2005)
- (Brazil) Edinho (July 25, 2005 – Aug 21, 2005)
- (Brazil) Dorival Júnior (Nov 7, 2005 – Sept 4, 2006)
- (Brazil) Givanildo Oliveira (Aug 1, 2006 – Dec 6, 2006)
- (Brazil) Alexandre Gallo (Dec 7, 2006 – April 24, 2007)
- (Brazil) Giba (May 3, 2007 – June 11, 2007)
- (Brazil) Edson Leivinha (interim) (June 15, 2007 – June 18, 2007)
- (Brazil) Geninho (June 19, 2007 – Dec 31, 2007)

== Managers performance (since 2008) ==
Name	Nation	From	To	P	W	D	L	GF	GA	Avg%
Nelsinho Baptista	BRA	12 Jan 2008	24 May 2009	105	60	22	23	189	98	64%
Levi Gomes (c)	BRA	30 May 2009		1	0	1	0	2	2	33%
Émerson Leão	BRA	7 June 2009	26 Jul 2009	10	3	2	5	17	18	36%
Levi Gomes (c)	BRA	29 Jul 2009	6 Aug 2009	3	0	0	3	1	7	0%
Péricles Chamusca	BRA	10 Aug 2009	7 Nov 2009	17	4	5	8	22	28	33%
Levi Gomes (c)	BRA	11 Nov 2009	6 Dec 2009	4	0	1	3	3	10	8%
Givanildo Oliveira	BRA	13 Jan 2010	25 May 2010	35	20	8	7	64	36	64%
Toninho Cerezo	BRA	29 May 2010	7 Aug 2010	8	3	2	3	13	9	45%
Geninho	BRA	10 Aug 2010	6 Feb 2011	35	16	10	9	45	31	55%
Gustavo Bueno (c)	BRA	9 Feb 2011		1	0	0	1	0	1	0%
Hélio dos Anjos	BRA	13 Feb 2011	18 Jun 2011	24	11	7	6	35	24	55%
Mazola Júnior (c)	BRA	24 Jun 2011	20 Aug 2011	12	5	2	5	21	18	47%
PC Gusmão	BRA	23 Aug 2011	29 Oct 2011	15	6	4	5	22	18	48%
Mazola Júnior	BRA	4 Nov 2011	13 May 2012	34	21	8	5	66	35	69%
Gustavo Bueno (c)	BRA	19 May 2012		1	0	1	0	1	1	33%
Vagner Mancini	BRA	26 May 2012	11 Aug 2012	15	3	4	8	12	22	28%
Gustavo Bueno (c)	BRA	15 Aug 2012	18 Aug 2012	2	0	0	2	0	3	0%
Waldemar Lemos	BRA	26 Aug 2012	4 Oct 2012	10	3	4	3	11	17	43%
Sérgio Guedes	BRA	11 Oct 2012	2 Dec 2012	10	4	2	4	15	13	46%
Vadão	BRA	20 Jan 2013	6 Mar 2013	12	5	6	1	21	10	58%
Gustavo Bueno (c)	BRA	10 Mar 2013		1	1	0	0	2	0	100%
Sérgio Guedes	BRA	13 Mar 2013	21 May 2013	14	7	3	4	30	17	57%
Gustavo Bueno (c)	BRA	25 May 2013		1	0	0	1	1	2	0%
Marcelo Martelotte	BRA	28 May 2013	7 Sep 2013	21	11	1	9	34	33	54%
Neco (c)	BRA	10 Sep 2013		1	0	0	1	2	4	0%
Geninho	BRA	14 Sep 2013	29 Jan 2014	23	10	4	9	31	26	49%
Eduardo Baptista	BRA	2 Feb 2014	7 Dec 2014	64	30	13	21	76	65	53%
Pedro Gama (c)	BRA	15 May 2014		1	0	0	1	1	2	0%
Eduardo Baptista	BRA	24 Jan 2015	16 Sep 2015	59	27	18	14	91	56	56%
Daniel Paulista (c)	BRA	20 Sep 2015		1	0	0	1	1	2	0%
Paulo Roberto Falcão	BRA	23 Sep 2015	17 Apr 2016	34	18	6	10	51	31	58%
Thiago Gomes (c)	BRA	6 Apr 2016	28 Apr 2016	4	1	0	3	2	5	25%
Oswaldo de Oliveira	BRA	4 May 2016	12 Oct 2016	32	9	9	14	38	44	37%
Luiz Alberto Da Silva (c)	BRA	4 Jul 2016	8 Sep 2016	2	0	0	2	1	6	0%
Daniel Paulista	BRA	16 Oct 2016	26 Mar 2017	25	15	5	5	41	17	66%
Thiago Duarte (c)	BRA	1 Mar 2017		1	0	1	0	1	1	33%
Ney Franco	BRA	30 Mar 2017	21 May 2017	17	6	4	7	25	31	43%
Junior Camara (c)	BRA	3 Apr 2017		1	0	1	0	2	2	33%
Daniel Paulista (c)	BRA	28 May 2017		1	1	0	0	4	3	100%
Vanderlei Luxemburgo	BRA	31 May 2017	26 Oct 2017	33	10	8	15	37	42	38%
Júnior Lopes (c)	BRA	6 Jul 2017		1	1	0	0	2	0	100%
Daniel Paulista	BRA	29 Oct 2017	3 Dec 2017	9	3	2	4	10	15	40%
Nelsinho Baptista	BRA	14 Jan 2018	23 Apr 2018	18	8	7	3	27	15	57%
Claudinei Oliveira	BRA	29 Apr 2018	12 Aug 2018	16	5	4	7	18	23	39%
Eduardo Baptista	BRA	18 Aug 2018	23 Sep 2018	8	1	1	6	2	12	16%
Milton Mendes	BRA	30 Sep 2018	2 Dec 2018	12	5	3	4	14	18	50%
Milton Cruz	BRA	19 Jan 2019	17 Feb 2019	7	4	0	3	12	8	57%
Guto Ferreira	BRA	28 Feb 2019	12 Feb 2020	56	26	24	6	81	45	60%
Cesar Lucena (c)	BRA	15 Feb 2020		1	0	0	1	0	2	0%
Daniel Paulista	BRA	22 Feb 2020	23 Aug 2020	17	6	5	6	23	15	45%
Jair Ventura	BRA	30 Aug 2020	3 Apr 2021	39	13	7	19	34	54	39%
Ricardo Pinto (c)	BRA	23 Nov 2020		1	0	0	1	0	1	0%
Cesar Lucena (c)	BRA	28 Nov 2020		1	0	0	1	2	4	0%
Emilio Faro (c)	BRA	15 Feb 2021		1	0	1	0	0	0	0%
Ricardo Severo (c)	BRA	24 Feb 2021		1	1	0	0	3	1	100%
Emílio Faro (c)	BRA	3 Mar 2021		1	0	0	1	1	2	0%
Ricardo Severo (c)	BRA	6 Mar 2021		1	0	0	1	0	2	0%
Cesar Lucena (c)	BRA	7 Apr 2021	18 Apr 2021	4	2	2	0	7	2	66%
Umberto Louzer	BRA	24 Apr 2021	22 Aug 2021	22	6	8	8	15	16	39%
Ricardo Severo (c)	BRA	28 Aug 2021		1	0	1	0	0	0	33%
Gustavo Florentín	PAR	5 Sep 2021	3 Mar 2022	31	10	8	13	33	32	40%
Cesar Lucena (c)	BRA	6 Nov 2021		1	0	0	1	0	1	0%
Cesar Lucena (c)	BRA	19 Feb 2022		1	0	1	0	2	2	33%
Cesar Lucena (c)	BRA	5 Mar 2022	12 Mar 2022	3	2	1	0	6	4	77%
Gilmar Dal Pozzo	BRA	16 Mar 2022	25 Jun 2022	21	8	9	4	22	11	52%
Cesar Lucena (c)	BRA	28 Jun 2022		1	0	0	1	1	2	0%
Lisca	BRA	3 Jul 2022	19 Jul 2022	4	1	3	0	2	0	50%
Cesar Lucena (c)	BRA	22 Jul 2022		1	0	0	1	1	4	0%
Claudinei Oliveira	BRA	28 Jul 2022	6 Nov 2022	18	9	3	6	24	19	55%
Enderson Moreira	BRA	11 Jan 2023	18 Nov 2023	68	39	17	12	124	59	65%
César Lucena (c)	BRA	25 Nov 2023		1	1	0	0	4	1	100%
Mariano Soso	ARG	13 Jan 2024	23 Jul 2024	42	23	10	9	62	38	62%
César Lucena (c)	BRA	27 Jul 2024	2 Sep 2024	2	2	0	0	6	3	100%
Guto Ferreira	BRA	2 Aug 2024	27 Aug 2024	5	1	1	3	4	7	26%
Pepa	POR	7 Sep 2024	3 May 2025	42	21	7	14	68	39	55%
César Lucena (c)	BRA	11 Jan 2025	18 Jan 2025	3	0	3	0	3	3	33%

(c) Indicates the caretaker manager
