= Alex Bruno =

Alex Bruno is a name. People with that name include:

- Alex Bruno (footballer, born 1982), Brazilian center-back
- Alex Bruno (footballer, born 1993), Brazilian winger
- Alex Bruno (footballer, born 1999), Brazilian forward
