= Eduardo Barroca =

Brazilian football manager

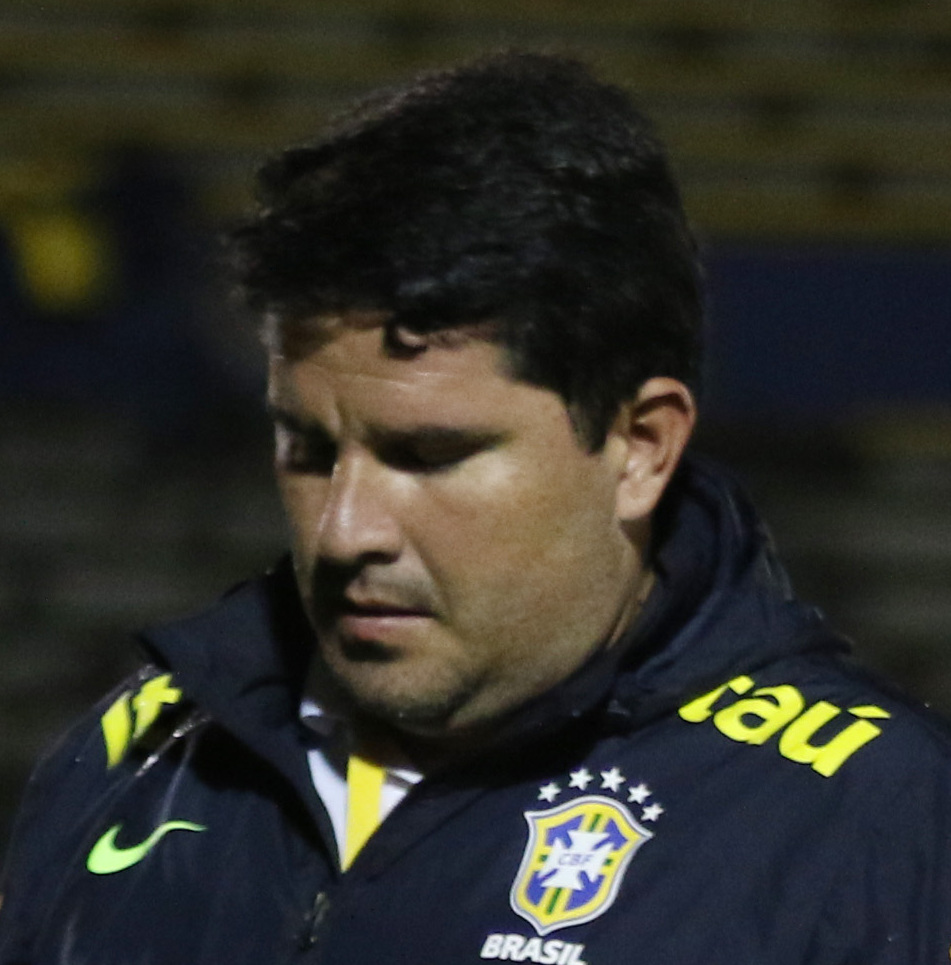
- Barroca as the assistant of the Brazil national under-20 team in 2017

Personal information
- Full name: Eduardo de Souza Barroca
- Date of birth: 22 April 1982 (age 44)
- Place of birth: Rio de Janeiro, Brazil

Managerial career
- Years: Team
- 2003–2007: Madureira (assistant)
- 2007: Sendas U17
- 2008: Sendas
- 2009–2010: PAEC (assistant)
- 2010: Corinthians U17
- 2011–2013: Bahia (assistant)
- 2011: Bahia (interim)
- 2012: Bahia (interim)
- 2012: Bahia (interim)
- 2013: Bahia (interim)
- 2013: Bahia (interim)
- 2013: Audax Rio U20 (assistant)
- 2014: Botafogo (assistant)
- 2015: Vasco da Gama (assistant)
- 2016–2018: Botafogo U20
- 2017: Brazil U20 (assistant)
- 2018–2019: Corinthians U20
- 2019: Botafogo
- 2019: Atlético Goianiense
- 2020: Coritiba
- 2020: Vitória
- 2020–2021: Botafogo
- 2021: Atlético Goianiense
- 2022: Avaí
- 2022: Bahia
- 2023: Ceará
- 2023–2024: Avaí
- 2025: Mirassol
- 2025–2026: CRB

Eduardo de Souza Ney Barroca (born 22 April 1982) is a Brazilian professional football coach.

== Career ==
Born in Rio de Janeiro, Barroca started his career at Flamengo in 2000, working as a fitness coach of the under-13 squad. In 2003 he moved to Madureira, being appointed assistant coach.

Barroca's first coaching experience occurred with Sendas in 2007, as he was in charge of the under-17s; the following year, he was named first team coach. In 2009, he joined Pão de Açúcar EC as an assistant.

In January 2011, after a short stint as Corinthians' under-17 head coach, Barroca joined Bahia, working as Rogério Lourenço's assistant. On 9 February 2011, he was the club's interim coach during a 2–0 Campeonato Baiano defeat of Camaçari, as Lourenço was sacked.

Barroca acted as an interim for Bahia in a further eight occasions, being also the youngest head coach to win a Série A match after defeating Flamengo on 4 September 2011, aged only 29. On 18 May 2013, he left the club, and subsequently returned to Sendas (now named Audax Rio) to work as an assistant coach of the under-20s. The following January, he joined Botafogo as a permanent assistant coach of the first team.

On 2 June 2014, Barroca signed for Fluminense to work as a coordinator. The following 5 January, he was named Doriva's assistant at Vasco da Gama.

On 1 March 2016, Barroca returned to Botafogo, being named head coach of the under-20 squad. On 29 May 2018, he moved back to Corinthians, also as an under-20 coach.

On 14 April 2019, Barroca was announced as head coach of Botafogo, replacing fired Zé Ricardo. On 6 October, however, he was himself sacked after a poor run of results, and took over Atlético Goianiense eight days later.

In December 2019, after taking Atlético to the top tier, Barroca left the club, and was appointed head coach of another newly promoted side, Coritiba, on 20 December. He was sacked the following 20 August, as the club was ranked last in the league.

Barroca took over Vitória in the second division on 7 October 2020. He left the club on 27 November to return to his former side Botafogo, in the place of Ramón Díaz, but was himself dismissed the following 6 February, after the club's relegation.

On 27 May 2021, Barroca returned to Atlético Goianiense, in the place of Jorginho. He left on a mutual agreement on 27 September, after only one win in the last ten matches.

On 13 February 2022, Barroca was named head coach of Avaí, also in the top tier. On 12 September, with the club in the relegation zone, he was sacked, and returned to Bahia in the second division on 2 October.

On 6 November 2022, after achieving promotion to the top tier, Barroca left Bahia. The following 24 April, he replaced Gustavo Morínigo at the helm of Ceará, but was himself dismissed on 28 June.

On 3 July 2023, Barroca returned to Avaí, also replacing Morínigo. He was dismissed on 26 April of the following year, after a poor start in the 2024 Série B.

On 17 December 2024, Barroca was appointed head coach of first division newcomers Mirassol. The following 21 February, he left the club by mutual consent, and took over CRB on 27 March.

Barroca won the 2026 Campeonato Alagoano with CRB, but was sacked on 4 July 2026, after a 5–0 loss to Londrina.

== Coaching statistics ==
As of 7 July 2026

Coaching record by team and tenure
Team	Nat	From	To	Record								Ref
Team	Nat	From	To	G	W	D	L	GF	GA	GD	Win %	Ref
Bahia (interim)	(Brazil)	7 February 2011	9 February 2011	1	1	0	0	2	0	+2	100.00	
Bahia (interim)	(Brazil)	2 September 2011	6 September 2011	1	1	0	0	3	1	+2	100.00	
Bahia (interim)	(Brazil)	2 February 2012	7 February 2012	2	2	0	0	6	3	+3	100.00	
Bahia (interim)	(Brazil)	20 July 2012	22 July 2012	1	0	1	0	2	2	+0	0.00	
Bahia (interim)	(Brazil)	28 August 2012	29 August 2012	1	1	0	0	3	1	+2	100.00	
Bahia (interim)	(Brazil)	7 April 2013	11 April 2013	1	1	0	0	2	0	+2	100.00	
Bahia (interim)	(Brazil)	7 May 2013	15 May 2013	1	1	0	0	1	0	+1	100.00	
Botafogo	(Brazil)	16 April 2019	6 October 2019	27	10	3	14	24	28	−4	37.04	
Atlético Goianiense	(Brazil)	12 October 2019	30 November 2019	9	3	5	1	13	8	+5	33.33	
Coritiba	(Brazil)	20 December 2019	20 August 2020	22	11	3	8	34	23	+11	50.00	
Vitória	(Brazil)	7 October 2020	27 November 2020	9	1	5	3	8	8	+0	11.11	
Botafogo	(Brazil)	27 November 2020	6 February 2021	9	1	1	7	5	17	−12	11.11	
Atlético Goianiense	(Brazil)	27 May 2021	27 September 2021	25	7	11	7	22	24	−2	28.00	
Avaí	(Brazil)	13 February 2022	12 September 2022	34	8	10	16	34	49	−15	23.53	
Bahia	(Brazil)	2 October 2022	6 November 2022	6	2	4	0	7	5	+2	33.33	
Ceará	(Brazil)	27 April 2023	29 June 2023	13	6	3	4	16	13	+3	46.15	
Avaí	(Brazil)	7 July 2023	26 April 2024	43	16	14	13	52	53	−1	37.21	
Mirassol	(Brazil)	17 December 2024	21 February 2025	11	5	1	5	19	18	+1	45.45	
CRB	(Brazil)	27 March 2025	4 July 2026	78	32	19	27	101	89	+12	41.03	
Total				294	109	80	105	354	342	+12	37.07	—

== Honors ==
Ceará

- Copa do Nordeste: 2023

CRB

- Campeonato Alagoano: 2026
