= Murici Sport Clube =

Murici SC
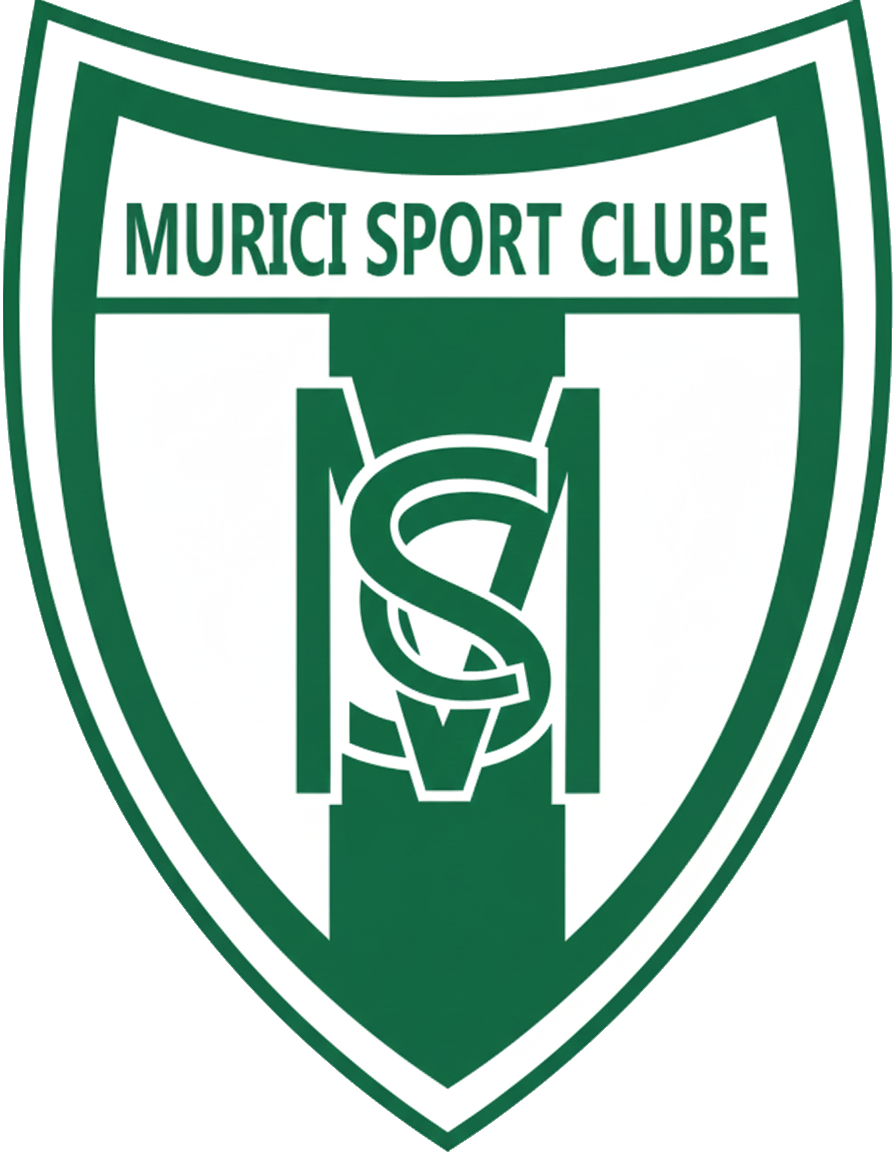
- Full name: Murici Sport Clube
- Nickname: Verdão das Matas (Big Green of the Matas)
- Founded: 29 July 2021; 4 years ago
- Ground: Estádio José Gomes da Costa
- Capacity: 6,000
- Owner: Jorge Gonzaga
- President: Francisco Artur de Souza
- Head coach: Gabriel Teixeira
- League: Campeonato Alagoano
Home colours	Away colours	Third colours

Murici Sport Clube is a Brazilian football club from Murici in the state of Alagoas. Founded in 2021, the club plays in the Campeonato Alagoano, the top division of football in the state.

== History ==
The club was founded in 2021 as Guarany Alagoano in Maceió. In 2024, the club finished third in the Campeonato Alagoano Second Division and was eliminated in the semi-finals; director Jorge Gonzaga said that the season had cost 150,000 Brazilian reais.

In October 2025, Guarany Alagoano lost 4–3 on aggregate to Cruzeiro de Arapiraca in the final of the second division, and missed out on promotion to the Campeonato Alagoano. On 18 November 2025, Murici FC withdrew from the Campeonato Alagoano for financial reasons, and was replaced by Guarany Alagoano, who relocated to the city of Murici and was renamed Murici Sport Clube. The new club came fourth in its first top-flight season in 2026, then lost the semi-final 3–0 on aggregate to ASA.
