= Gustavo (footballer, born 2002) =

Brazilian footballer

Personal information
- Full name: Gustavo Silva de Oliveira
- Date of birth: 11 September 2002 (age 24)
- Place of birth: Presidente Dutra, Brazil
- Position: Midfielder

Team information
- Current team: Coritiba
- Number: 39

Youth career
- –2018: Ceará
- 2019–2020: Sport Recife

Senior career*
Years	Team	Apps	(Gls)
2020–2022	Sport Recife	31	(2)
2022–2026	Shabab Al Ahli	20	(2)
2023–2024	→ Kalba (loan)	18	(1)
2024–2025	→ Kalba (loan)	12	(0)
2025–2026	→ Dubai United (loan)		
2026–	Coritiba	2	(0)

International career^{‡}
2020–	Brazil U20	1	(0)
- * Club domestic league appearances and goals as of 4 October 2021 ‡ National team caps and goals as of 15 March 2021

Gustavo Silva de Oliveira (born 11 September 2002), commonly known as Gustavo, is a Brazilian professional footballer who plays as a midfielder for Coritiba.

== Career statistics ==
=== Club ===
As of 25 July 2024

Club	Season	League			State League		National Cup		Continental		Other		Total	
Club	Season	Division	Apps	Goals	Apps	Goals	Apps	Goals	Apps	Goals	Apps	Goals	Apps	Goals
Sport Recife	2020	Série A	4	0	—		—		—		—		4	0
Sport Recife	2021	Série A	27	2	5 (Note: Appearance(s) in Campeonato Pernambucano)	0	1	0	—		7 (Note: Appearance(s) in Copa do Nordeste)	0	40	2
Sport Recife	2022	Série A	—		1	2	—		—		0	0	1	2
Sport Recife	Total		31	2	6	2	1	0	—		7	0	45	4
Shabab Al Ahli	2021-22	UAE Pro League	8	1	—		—		3 (Note: Appearance(s) in AFC Champions League)	0	2 (Note: Appearance(s) in UAE League Cup)	2	13	3
Shabab Al Ahli	2022-23	UAE Pro League	12	1	—		—		—		0	0	12	1
Shabab Al Ahli	Total		20	2	—		—		3	0	2	2	25	4
Kalba (loan)	2023-24	UAE Pro League	18	1	—		—		—		5	0	23	1
Career Total			69	5	6	2	1	0	3	0	14	2	93	9
