= Alex Bruno (footballer, born 1999) =

Brazilian footballer (born 1999)

Personal information
- Full name: Alex Bruno da Costa Lima
- Date of birth: 7 January 1999 (age 27)
- Place of birth: Recife, Brazil
- Height: 1.90 m (6 ft 3 in)
- Position: Forward

Team information
- Current team: Vitória (on loan from ASA)
- Number: 9

Youth career
- Vitória das Tabocas

Senior career*
Years	Team	Apps	(Gls)
2020	Vitória das Tabocas	4	(0)
2020–2022	Próspera	24	(2)
2021	→ Atlético Catarinense (loan)	17	(9)
2021	→ Noroeste (loan)	0	(0)
2022	→ Grêmio Anápolis (loan)	6	(1)
2022	→ Carlos Renaux (loan)	11	(5)
2023–2026	Plaza Colonia	74	(7)
2026	→ ASA (loan)	11	(6)
2026–	ASA	14	(9)
2026–	→ Vitória (loan)	1	(0)
- * Club domestic league appearances and goals as of 17:51, 10 September 2026 (UTC)

Alex Bruno da Costa Lima (born 7 January 1999), known as Alex Bruno, is a Brazilian professional footballer who plays as a forward for Vitória, on loan from ASA.

== Career ==
Born in Recife, Pernambuco, Alex Bruno finished his formation with Vitória das Tabocas, and made his first team debut in 2020. He subsequently joined Próspera, but served several loan stints at Atlético Catarinense, Noroeste, Grêmio Anápolis and Carlos Renaux.

On 4 February 2023, after being the top scorer of the 2022 Copa Santa Catarina, Alex Bruno moved abroad and signed for Uruguayan club Plaza Colonia. At the side, he only became a starter in the 2024 season, helping the club to win the Segunda División.

In December 2025, Alex Bruno returned to Brazil and joined ASA on loan. The following 21 March, after scoring six goals in the 2026 Campeonato Alagoano, he signed a permanent deal with the club until 2029.

On 18 August 2026, Alex Bruno moved straight to the Série A, after joining Vitória on loan with a buyout clause. He made his debut in the category eleven days later, starting in a 2–1 away loss to Atlético Mineiro.

== Career statistics ==
As of 10 September 2026.

Club	Season	League			State League		Cup		Continental		Other		Total	
Club	Season	Division	Apps	Goals	Apps	Goals	Apps	Goals	Apps	Goals	Apps	Goals	Apps	Goals
Vitória das Tabocas	2020	Pernambucano	—		4	0	—		—		—		4	0
Próspera	2020	Catarinense Série B	—		10	2	—		—		—		10	2
Próspera	2021	Catarinense	—		11	0	—		—		—		11	0
Próspera	2022	Série D	—		3	0	—		—		—		3	0
Próspera	Total		—		24	2	—		—		—		24	2
Atlético Catarinense (loan)	2021	Catarinense Série B	—		17	9	—		—		—		17	9
Noroeste (loan)	2021	Paulista A3	—		—		—		—		7 (Note: Appearance(s) in Copa Paulista)	1	7	1
Grêmio Anápolis (loan)	2022	Série D	2	0	4	1	1	0	—		—		7	1
Carlos Renaux (loan)	2022	Catarinense Série B	—		11	5	—		—		5 (Note: Appearance(s) in Copa Santa Catarina)	0	16	5
Plaza Colonia	2023	Primera División	21	1	—		1	0	—		—		22	1
Plaza Colonia	2024	Segunda División	26	5	—		1	0	—		—		27	5
Plaza Colonia	2025	Liga AUF Uruguaya	27	1	—		3	0	—		—		30	1
Plaza Colonia	Total		74	7	—		5	0	—		—		79	7
ASA	2026	Série D	14	9	11	6	1	1	—		8 (Note: Three appearances and five goals in Copa Alagoas, five appearances and three goals in Copa do Nordeste)	8	34	24
Vitória (loan)	2026	Série A	1	0	—		—		—		—		1	0
Career total			91	16	71	21	7	1	0	0	20	9	189	47

== Honours ==
Próspera

- Campeonato Catarinense Série B: 2020

Plaza Colonia

- Uruguayan Segunda División: 2024
