= Douglas Baggio =

Brazilian footballer (born 1995)

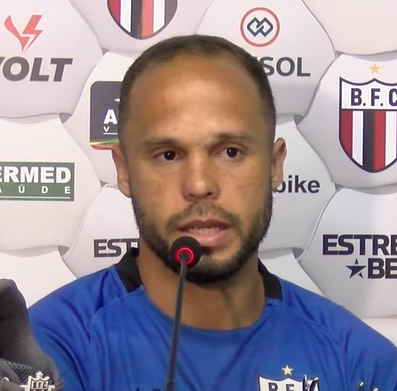
- Douglas Baggio in 2024

Personal information
- Full name: Douglas Baggio de Oliveira Costa
- Date of birth: 2 February 1995 (age 31)
- Place of birth: Jaboatão dos Guararapes, Brazil
- Height: 1.72 m (5 ft 7 1/2 in)
- Position: Striker

Team information
- Current team: CRB
- Number: 7

Youth career
- 2009: Santa Cruz
- 2010–2015: Flamengo

Senior career*
Years	Team	Apps	(Gls)
2014–2017	Flamengo	1	(0)
2016	→ Luverdense (loan)	30	(2)
2017	→ Ceará (loan)	5	(1)
2017	→ Luverdense (loan)	28	(2)
2018	Mirassol	12	(0)
2018	Boa Esporte	30	(3)
2019	Brasil de Pelotas	14	(0)
2020	Santo André	11	(2)
2020–2021	Goiás	25	(0)
2021–2023	Novorizontino	122	(19)
2024–2025	Botafogo-SP	58	(5)
2025–	CRB	66	(8)
- * Club domestic league appearances and goals as of 16 November 2026

Douglas Baggio de Oliveira Costa (born 2 February 1995) is a Brazilian footballer who plays as striker for CRB.

== Club career ==
=== Flamengo ===
Douglas Baggio began his career with Flamengo, joining the youth side in 2010. Following his promising performances for the club in tournaments at under-17 level, which saw him score an impressive 72 goals in 2012, he was subsequently promoted to the senior team, and was also linked with several major European clubs in the media. He made his debut for the senior team on 16 March 2014, in a 2–2 draw with Bangu. In 2015, he signed a new contract extension with the club, which would see him remain with the team until 2017.

==== Luverdense (First loan) ====
After struggling to find space in the Flamengo first team, in February 2016, Douglas Baggio was sent on loan to Série B side Luverdense in order to gain playing time.

==== Ceará (loan) ====
On 22 December 2016 Ceará signed Douglas for a one-year loan until the end of 2017.

==== Luverdense (second loan) ====
After a brief loan spell with Ceará, Douglas returned to Luverdense on loan for a second time in 2017.

=== Mirassol ===
In January 2018, after his contract with Flamengo had expired, Douglas Baggio was signed by Mirassol.

=== Boa Esporte ===
In April 2018 Douglas Baggio joined Boa Esporte to play in 2018 Campeonato Brasileiro Série B. He featured in thirty games, scoring three times.

=== Brasil de Pelotas ===
Douglas Baggio joined Grêmio Esportivo Brasil for the 2019 season.

== Style of play ==
As a striker, Douglas Baggio is known for his speed, technique, and eye for goal. His main influences as a footballer are Cristiano Ronaldo and Willian.

== Personal life ==
Douglas Baggio is named after Italian former footballer Roberto Baggio. In an interview, he explained the reason behind his name, commenting that his father, while watching the 1994 World Cup Final penalty shoot-out between Brazil and Italy, reportedly stated that if Italy's final penalty taker – Baggio – were to miss his kick, then he would name his son after him; Baggio kicked the ball over the bar, which resulted in Brazil winning the World Cup, and a year later, Douglas Baggio was born.

== Career statistics ==
=== Club ===
As of 7 February 2022.

Club	Season	League			State League		Cup		Continental		Other		Total	
Club	Season	Division	Apps	Goals	Apps	Goals	Apps	Goals	Apps	Goals	Apps	Goals	Apps	Goals
Flamengo	2014	Série A	0	0	1	0	—		—		—		1	0
Flamengo	2015	Série A	0	0	0	0	0	0	0	0	0	0	0	0
Flamengo	Total		0	0	1	0	0	0	0	0	0	0	1	0
Luverdense (loan)	2016	Série B	30	2	9	2	—		—		—		39	4
Ceará (loan)	2017	Série B	0	0	5	1	1	0	—		1 (Note: Appearances in 2017 Primeira Liga.)	0	7	1
Luverdense (loan)	2017	Série B	28	2	—		—		—		6 (Note: Appearances and goal in 2017 Copa Verde.)	1	34	3
Mirassol	2018	Série D	0	0	12	0	—		—		—		12	0
Boa Esporte	2018	Série B	30	3	—		—		—		—		30	3
Brasil de Pelotas	2019	Série B	6	0	8	0	1	0	—		—		15	0
Santo André	2020	Paulista	—		11	2	2	1	—		—		11	2
Goiás	2020	Série A	25	0	—		—		—		—		25	0
Novorizontino	2021	Série C	19	3	12	1	—		—		—		31	4
Novorizontino	2022	Série B	0	0	5	0	0	0	—		—		5	0
Novorizontino	Total		19	3	17	1	0	0	—		—		36	4
Career total			135	10	63	6	4	1	0	0	7	1	209	18

== Honours ==
Flamengo

- Campeonato Carioca: 2014

Ceará

- Campeonato Cearense: 2017

Luverdense

- Copa Verde: 2017
- Campeonato Mato-Grossense: 2016
