= Thiago Lopes =

Brazilian footballer

Personal information
- Full name: Thiago Ferreira Lopes
- Date of birth: 27 October 1996 (age 30)
- Place of birth: Belo Horizonte, Brazil
- Height: 1.78 m (5 ft 10 in)
- Position: Midfielder

Team information
- Current team: Ferroviária

Youth career
- 2011–2014: Coritiba

Senior career*
Years	Team	Apps	(Gls)
2015–2021	Coritiba	112	(7)
2017	→ Londrina (loan)	9	(0)
2020–2021	→ Vitória (loan)	18	(1)
2021–2024	Sport	46	(2)
2023	→ Vitória (loan)	16	(0)
2024	Náutico	6	(1)
2025–	Noroeste	12	(0)
2025–	→ Ferroviária (loan)	34	(4)
- * Club domestic league appearances and goals as of 19 December 2025

Thiago Ferreira Lopes (born 27 October 1996), known as Thiago Lopes, is a Brazilian professional footballer who plays for Ferroviária, on loan from Noroeste. Mainly a midfielder, he can also play as a right back.

== Career ==
Thiago Lopes was in the youth ranks at Coritiba since 2011, and was called-up to the first team after impressing coach Ney Franco in a friendly match between the youth and first teams in early 2015. He made his first team debut on 19 August 2015, in the 2015 Copa do Brasil Round of 16 match against Grêmio, coming on as a substitute in the second half. His national league debut came as a starter on 6 September against Avaí in 2015 Campeonato Brasileiro Série A. His first senior goal for the club came in a 2016 Campeonato Paranaense game against Athletico Paranaense on 20 March 2016.

In May 2017, having lost his place in the Coritiba team, he was loaned to state rivals Londrina to play in the latter stages of the 2017 Primeira Liga and the 2017 Campeonato Brasileiro Série B.

In 2018 his season was marred by a number of injuries, and he didn't play between September 2018 and March 2019.

He is currently contracted to the club until December 2021.

== Career statistics ==
As of match played 12 June 2019.

Appearances and goals by club, season and competition
Club	Season	League			State League		Copa do Brasil		Continental		Other		Total	
Club	Season	Division	Apps	Goals	Apps	Goals	Apps	Goals	Apps	Goals	Apps	Goals	Apps	Goals
Coritiba	2015	Série A	7	0	—		2	0	—		—		9	0
Coritiba	2016	Série A	8	0	13	2	2	0	1 (Note: Appearance in 2016 Copa Sudamericana.)	0	0	0	24	2
Coritiba	2017	Série A	0	0	7	0	1	0	—		2 (Note: Appearances in 2017 Primeira Liga.)	0	10	0
Coritiba	2018	Série B	6	0	12	1	4	0	—		—		22	1
Coritiba	2019	Série B	3	0	2	0	0	0	—		—		5	0
Coritiba	Total		24	0	34	3	9	0	1	0	2	0	70	3
Londrina (loan)	2017	Série B	9	0	—		—		—		0	0	9	0
Career Total			33	0	34	3	9	0	1	0	2	0	79	3
