= Ricardo Severo =

Brazilian football manager

Personal information
- Full name: Ricardo Alessandro Severo
- Date of birth: 1 March 1976 (age 50)
- Place of birth: Curitiba, Brazil

Team information
- Current team: Corinthians U17 (assistant)

Managerial career
- Years: Team
- 1997–1998: Atlético Paranaense (youth)
- 1998–2002: J. Malucelli (youth)
- 2002–2003: Metropolitano (youth)
- 2004–2005: Brusque (assistant)
- 2006: Marcílio Dias (assistant)
- 2007–2008: Grêmio Barueri (assistant)
- 2008: Criciúma (assistant)
- 2008: Gama (assistant)
- 2008–2009: Mogi Mirim (assistant)
- 2009: Joinville (assistant)
- 2010–2011: Santos U15
- 2011–2013: Palmeiras U15
- 2015–2016: Corinthians U15
- 2017: Ituano U15
- 2017–2018: Ituano U20
- 2019: Oeste U20
- 2020: Vilafranquense (youth)
- 2020–2021: Sport Recife U20
- 2021: Sport Recife (interim)
- 2022: URT
- 2024–: Corinthians U17 (assistant)

Ricardo Alessandro Severo (born 1 March 1976) is a Brazilian football coach. He is the current assistant coach of Corinthians' under-17 team.

== Career ==
Born in Curitiba, Paraná, Severo began his career with the youth categories of hometown side Atlético Paranaense. He subsequently worked at J. Malucelli and Metropolitano before being named Gelson Silva's assistant at Brusque in 2004.

Severo worked with Silva at Marcílio Dias, Grêmio Barueri, Criciúma, Gama, Mogi Mirim and Joinville before returning to youth coaching in 2010, with the under-15 squad of Santos. He then worked as an under-15 manager at Palmeiras, Corinthians and Ituano, being named at the helm of the latter's under-20s in 2017. He was also in charge of Oeste's under-20 team during most of the 2019 season, but was dismissed and subsequently moved abroad to Portuguese side Vilafranquense in the following year.

On 8 November 2020, Severo was appointed manager of Sport Recife's under-20 squad. He was also an interim manager of the main squad for the first match of the 2021 Campeonato Pernambucano, as the first team was still involved in the latter stages of the 2020 Campeonato Brasileiro Série A.

On 28 August 2021, Severo was again interim manager of the main squad in a 0–0 Série A home draw against Chapecoense, as new manager Gustavo Florentín was not in charge of the side.
