= Leandro Barcia =

Uruguayan footballer (born 1992)

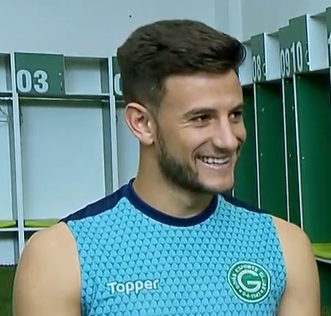
- Barcia in 2019

Personal information
- Full name: Leandro Barcia Montero
- Date of birth: 8 October 1992 (age 34)
- Place of birth: Florida, Uruguay
- Height: 1.73 m (5 ft 8 in)
- Position: Forward

Team information
- Current team: Boston River
- Number: 14

Senior career*
| Years | Team | Apps | (Gls) |
| 2014–2018 | Nacional | 86 | (15) |
| 2019–2022 | Rentistas | 0 | (0) |
| 2019 | → Goiás (loan) | 35 | (5) |
| 2020–2021 | → Sport Recife (loan) | 21 | (4) |
| 2022 | → Atlético Goianiense (loan) | 1 | (0) |
| 2022 | → Ponte Preta (loan) | 8 | (0) |
| 2023 | Defensor Sporting | 21 | (3) |
| 2024 | Náutico Capibaribe | 17 | (1) |
| 2024– | Boston River | 1 | (0) |
- * Club domestic league appearances and goals as of 4 September 2024

Leandro Barcia Montero (born 8 October 1992 in Florida, Uruguay) is a Uruguayan footballer who currently plays for Uruguayan Primera División club Boston River.

He previously played for Brazilian clubs Goiás, Sport Recife, Atlético Goianiense, Ponte Preta and Náutico Capibaribe, in addition to Uruguayan Primera División clubs Nacional and Defensor Sporting.

== Career ==
On 15 January 2019 Goiás signed Barcia on a one-year deal.

On 2 January 2020 signed with another Brazilian club Sport Recife, recently promoted to the Campeonato Brasileiro Série A.

On 4 January 2022 Atlético Goianiense signed Barcia from Rentistas on a one year loan deal until 31 December 2022.

== Career statistics ==
As of 24 August 2023.

| Club | Season | League | | | Cup | | Continental | | Other | | Total | |
| Club | Season | Division | Apps | Goals | Apps | Goals | Apps | Goals | Apps | Goals | Apps | Goals |
|---|---|---|---|---|---|---|---|---|---|---|---|---|
| Nacional | 2013–14 | Primera División | 4 | 3 | — | | — | | — | | 4 | 3 |
| Nacional | 2014–15 | Primera División | 19 | 6 | — | | — | | — | | 19 | 6 |
| Nacional | 2015–16 | Primera División | 25 | 2 | — | | 4 (Note: Appearance(s) in Copa Sudamericana.) | 1 | — | | 29 | 3 |
| Nacional | 2016 | Primera División | 4 | 0 | — | | 10 (Note: Appearance(s) in Copa Libertadores.) | 1 | — | | 14 | 1 |
| Nacional | 2017 | Primera División | 4 | 1 | — | | 1 | 0 | — | | 5 | 1 |
| Nacional | 2018 | Primera División | 30 | 3 | — | | 5 | 2 | 1 (Note: Appearance(s) in Supercopa Uruguaya.) | 0 | 36 | 5 |
| Nacional | Total | | 86 | 15 | 0 | 0 | 20 | 4 | 1 | 0 | 107 | 19 |
| Goiás (loan) | 2019 | Série A | 35 | 5 | 6 | 0 | — | | 11 (Note: Eight appearances and two goals in Campeonato Goiano, three appearances and two goals in Copa Verde.) | 4 | 52 | 9 |
| Sport Recife (loan) | 2020 | Série A | 16 | 3 | 1 | 1 | — | | 11 (Note: Five appearances and two goals in Campeonato Pernambucano, six appearances and one goal in Copa do Nordeste.) | 3 | 28 | 7 |
| Sport Recife (loan) | 2021 | Série A | 5 | 1 | — | | — | | — | | 5 | 1 |
| Sport Recife (loan) | Total | | 21 | 4 | 1 | 1 | 0 | 0 | 11 | 3 | 33 | 8 |
| Atlético Goianiense (loan) | 2022 | Série A | 1 | 0 | 3 | 0 | 2 | 0 | 9 (Note: Appearance(s) in Campeonato Goiano.) | 1 | 15 | 1 |
| Ponte Preta (loan) | 2022 | Série B | 8 | 0 | — | | — | | — | | 8 | 0 |
| Defensor Sporting | 2023 | Uruguayan Primera División | 14 | 3 | — | | — | | — | | 14 | 3 |
| Career total | | | 165 | 27 | 10 | 1 | 22 | 4 | 32 | 8 | 229 | 40 |

== Honours ==
Nacional

- Uruguayan Primera División: 2014–15, 2016

Atlético Goianiense

- Campeonato Goiano: 2022
