= Iago Maidana =

Brazilian footballer (born 1996)

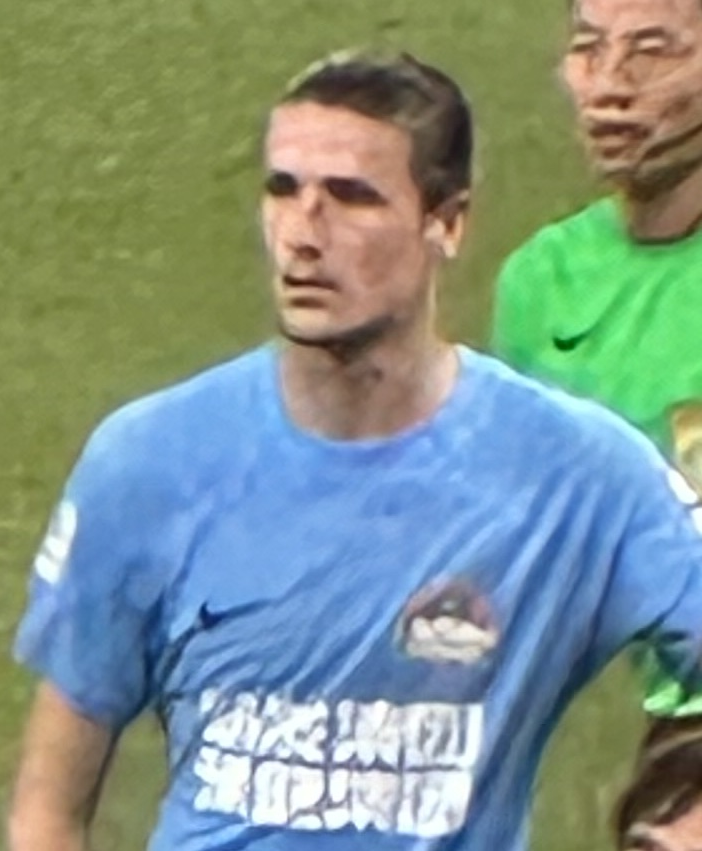
- Maidana in August 2024

Personal information
- Full name: Iago Justen Maidana Martins
- Date of birth: 6 February 1996 (age 30)
- Place of birth: Cruz Alta, Brazil
- Height: 1.96 m (6 ft 5 in)
- Position: Centre-back

Team information
- Current team: Henan FC
- Number: 2

Youth career
- 2010–2012: Cerâmica
- 2012: Gramadense
- 2012–2014: Criciúma
- 2015–2016: São Paulo

Senior career*
Years	Team	Apps	(Gls)
2014–2015	Criciúma	13	(0)
2016–2018	São Paulo	0	(0)
2017	→ São Bernardo (loan)	1	(0)
2017	→ Paraná (loan)	24	(5)
2018	→ Atlético Mineiro (loan)	25	(0)
2019–2022	Atlético Mineiro	15	(1)
2020–2021	→ Sport Recife (loan)	50	(8)
2021	→ Gil Vicente (loan)	0	(0)
2022–2024	América Mineiro	26	(3)
2024–	Henan FC	85	(10)

International career
2015	Brazil U20	2	(0)
- * Club domestic league appearances and goals as of 8 November 2026

Iago Justen Maidana Martins (born 6 February 1996), known as Iago Maidana, is a Brazilian footballer who plays as a central defender for Chinese Super League club Henan FC.

== Club career ==
Born in Cruz Alta, Rio Grande do Sul, Maidana finished his formation with Criciúma. He made his first team – and Série A – debut on 23 November 2014, starting in a 1–1 away draw against Flamengo.

On 7 September 2015 Maidana rescinded his contract with Criciúma, with the club still holding a percentage of his rights. Fifteen days later he joined São Paulo, who paid R$ 2 million for 60% of his rights to Monte Cristo EC.

On 5 January 2018, Maidana joined Atlético Mineiro on a season-long loan deal. A year later, he transferred on a permanent basis, signing a four-year contract with the club.

Maidana was sent on loan to Sport Recife for the 2020 season, in which he was the team's joint-top scorer with seven goals. On 9 March 2021, his loan was extended for an additional season. On 29 July, however, Sport released him from his contract due to financial difficulties.

On 23 August 2021, Maidana signed a season-long loan deal with Portuguese Primeira Liga side Gil Vicente. He made two Taça de Portugal appearances before leaving the club in December.

On 13 January 2022, Maidana joined América Mineiro on a two-year deal.

On 9 February 2024, Maidana joined Chinese Super League club Henan.

== International career ==
On 15 May 2015 Maidana was included in Brazil under-20s' final list ahead of that year's FIFA U-20 World Cup.

== Career statistics ==
As of match played 8 November 2026

Appearances and goals by club, season and competition
Club	Season	League			State League		Cup		League Cup		Continental		Other		Total	
Club	Season	Division	Apps	Goals	Apps	Goals	Apps	Goals	Apps	Goals	Apps	Goals	Apps	Goals	Apps	Goals
Criciúma	2014	Série A	3	0	—		—		—		—		—		3	0
Criciúma	2015	Série B	0	0	10	0	2	0	—		—		—		12	0
Criciúma	Total		3	0	10	0	2	0	—		—		—		15	0
São Paulo	2016	Série A	0	0	0	0	10	0	—		—		—		10	0
São Bernardo (loan)	2017	—			1	0	—		—		—		—		1	0
Paraná (loan)	2017	Série B	24	5	—		—		—		—		2	0	26	5
Atlético Mineiro (loan)	2018	Série A	22	0	3	0	1	0	—		1	0	—		27	0
Atlético Mineiro	2019	Série A	7	1	7	0	0	0	—		0	0	—		14	1
Atlético Mineiro	2020	Série A	—		1	0	1	0	—		1	0	—		3	0
Atlético Mineiro	Total		7	1	8	0	1	0	—		1	0	—		17	1
Sport Recife (loan)	2020	Série A	34	6	3	1	—		—		—		2	0	39	7
Sport Recife (loan)	2021	Série A	4	0	9	1	—		—		—		3	0	16	1
Sport Recife (loan)	Total		38	6	12	2	—		—		—		5	0	55	8
Gil Vicente (loan)	2021–22	Primeira Liga	0	0	—		2	0	0	0	—		—		2	0
América Mineiro	2022	Série A	17	3	5	0	3	0	—		10	1	—		35	4
América Mineiro	2023	Série A	30	0	9	0	6	0	—		5	0	—		50	0
América Mineiro	Total		47	3	14	0	9	0	—		15	1	—		85	4
Henan FC	2024	Chinese Super League	28	4	—		1	0	—		—		—		29	4
Henan FC	2025	Chinese Super League	28	4	—		4	0	—		—		—		32	4
Henan FC	2026	Chinese Super League	29	2	—		1	0	—		—		—		30	2
Henan FC	Total		85	10	—		6	0	—		—		—		91	10
Career total			226	25	48	2	31	0	0	0	17	1	7	0	329	28

== Honours ==
=== Club ===
São Paulo

- U-20 Copa Libertadores: 2016

Atlético Mineiro

- Campeonato Mineiro: 2022
