= Betinho (footballer, born 1992) =

Brazilian footballer

Personal information
- Full name: Roberto Pimenta Vinagre Filho
- Date of birth: 4 April 1992 (age 34)
- Place of birth: Castanhal, Brazil
- Height: 1.82 m (6 ft 0 in)
- Position: Defensive midfielder

Team information
- Current team: Arema
- Number: 18

Youth career
- Remo

Senior career*
Years	Team	Apps	(Gls)
2010–2012	Remo	19	(1)
2012–2020	Tombense	44	(6)
2013	→ Madureira (loan)	9	(1)
2014	→ América Mineiro (loan)	5	(0)
2015–2016	→ Mirasol (loan)	21	(1)
2017	→ Atlético Goianiense (loan)	10	(0)
2017	→ Guarani (loan)	16	(0)
2018–2019	→ Figueirense (loan)	67	(2)
2020	→ Sport Recife (loan)	32	(1)
2021	Sport Recife	12	(0)
2022	Chapecoense	21	(0)
2023–2024	Confiança	5	(0)
2024–2025	PSS Sleman	27	(1)
2025–	Arema	33	(0)
- * Club domestic league appearances and goals as of 6 November 2026

Roberto Pimenta Vinagre Filho (born 4 April 1992), commonly known as Betinho, is a Brazilian professional footballer who plays as a defensive midfielder for Super League club Arema.

== Club career ==
Born in Apeú, Castanhal, Pará, Betinho started his career with Remo in 2010. He only became a regular starter for the side during the 2012 Campeonato Paraense, but left the club in May of that year as his contract expired, and agreed to a deal with Tombense.

Betinho initially agreed to a loan deal with Série B side América de Natal in August 2012, but the deal later collapsed due to an injury, and he returned to Tombense for the 2013 Campeonato Mineiro. After being a regular starter for the club, loans to Madureira, América Mineiro, Mirassol, Atlético Goianiense, Guarani and Figueirense followed, where he was regularly used for most sides.

On 4 December 2019, still owned by Tombense, Betinho joined Série A side Sport Recife on loan for the campaign. He made his top tier debut at the age of 28 on 8 August 2020, starting in a 3–2 home win against Ceará.

== Career statistics ==
As of 25 November 2020

Club	Season	League			State League		Cup		Continental		Other		Total	
Club	Season	Division	Apps	Goals	Apps	Goals	Apps	Goals	Apps	Goals	Apps	Goals	Apps	Goals
Remo	2010	Série D	1	0	0	0	0	0	—		—		1	0
Remo	2011	Paraense	—		2	0	—		—		—		2	0
Remo	2012	Série D	0	0	16	1	1	0	—		—		17	1
Remo	Total		1	0	18	1	1	0	—		—		20	1
Tombense	2013	Mineiro	—		8	1	—		—		—		8	1
Tombense	2014	Série D	9	0	—		0	0	—		—		9	0
Tombense	2015	Série C	13	2	11	3	—		—		—		24	5
Tombense	2016	Série C	3	0	0	0	0	0	—		—		3	0
Tombense	Total		25	2	19	4	0	0	—		—		44	6
Madureira (loan)	2013	Série C	9	1	—		—		—		3 (Note: Appearance(s) in Copa Rio)	1	12	2
América Mineiro (loan)	2014	Série B	0	0	5	0	0	0	—		—		5	0
Mirassol (loan)	2015	Paulista A2	—		0	0	—		—		8 (Note: Appearance(s) in Copa Paulista)	3	8	3
Mirassol (loan)	2016	Paulista A2	—		21	1	—		—		—		21	1
Mirassol (loan)	Total		—		21	1	—		—		8	3	29	4
Atlético Goianiense (loan)	2017	Série A	0	0	10	0	1	0	—		—		11	0
Guarani (loan)	2017	Série B	16	0	—		—		—		—		16	0
Figueirense (loan)	2018	Série B	15	0	13	0	4	0	—		—		32	0
Figueirense (loan)	2019	Série B	26	1	13	1	2	0	—		—		41	2
Figueirense (loan)	Total		41	1	26	1	6	0	—		—		73	2
Sport Recife (loan)	2020	Série A	10	0	5	1	0	0	—		3 (Note: Appearance(s) in Copa do Nordeste)	0	18	1
Career total			102	4	104	8	8	0	0	0	14	4	228	16
