= Mikael (footballer, born 1999) =

Brazilian footballer

Personal information
- Full name: Mikael Filipe Viana de Sousa
- Date of birth: 28 May 1999 (age 27)
- Place of birth: Bacabal, Brazil
- Height: 1.84 m (6 ft 0 in)
- Position: Forward

Team information
- Current team: CRB
- Number: 28

Youth career
- 2017–2019: Sport Recife

Senior career*
Years	Team	Apps	(Gls)
2018–2022	Sport Recife	59	(16)
2019	→ América-PE (loan)	3	(0)
2020	→ Confiança (loan)	12	(4)
2022	→ Salernitana (loan)	7	(0)
2022–2024	Salernitana	6	(0)
2022	→ Internacional (loan)	1	(0)
2023	→ América Mineiro (loan)	7	(0)
2025–	CRB	78	(31)
- * Club domestic league appearances and goals as of 17 November 2026

Mikael Filipe Viana de Sousa (born 28 May 1999), simply known as Mikael, is a Brazilian footballer who plays as a forward for CRB.

== Club career ==
Born in Bacabal, Maranhão, Mikael joined Sport Recife's youth setup in 2017, after impressing on a trial at his hometown. After impressing with the under-20s, he made his first team debut on 4 February of the following year, coming on as a late substitute for fellow youth graduate Neto Moura in a 1–1 Campeonato Pernambucano away draw against Salgueiro.

On 18 February 2019, after being back with the under-20 side, Mikael was loaned to América-PE for the year's Pernambucano. Upon returning, he was again assigned to the under-20s while also featuring for the under-23s.

On 7 January 2020, Mikael joined Série B side Confiança also in a temporary deal. At the club he scored his first senior goal, netting his team's second in a 4–2 away win against Freipaulistano for the year's Copa do Nordeste on 8 February.

On 6 October 2020, Mikael was recalled by Sport. He made his Série A debut nine days later, replacing Marquinhos and scoring his team's third in a 3–5 home loss against Internacional.

On 31 January 2022, Mikael was loaned to Salernitana in Italy, with an option to buy and a conditional obligation to buy.

On 29 July 2022, Salernitana loaned Mikael to Internacional. On 2 February 2023, Mikael was loaned by América Mineiro. In August 2024, Salernitana terminated the contract with the player by mutual consent.

== Career statistics ==
As of 2 March 2023

Club	Season	League			State League		Cup		Continental		Other		Total	
Club	Season	Division	Apps	Goals	Apps	Goals	Apps	Goals	Apps	Goals	Apps	Goals	Apps	Goals
Sport Recife	2018	Série A	0	0	2	0	—		—		—		2	0
Sport Recife	2019	Série B	0	0	—		0	0	—		—		0	0
Sport Recife	2020	Série A	14	1	—		—		—		—		14	1
Sport Recife	2021	Série A	33	8	9	5	1	1	—		7 (Note: Appearance (s) in Copa do Nordeste)	1	50	15
Sport Recife	2022	Série B	0	0	1	2	0	0	—		2	3	3	5
Total			47	9	12	7	1	1	0	0	9	4	69	21
América-PE (loan)	2019	Pernambucano	—		3	0	—		—		—		3	0
Confiança (loan)	2020	Série B	4	0	8	4	0	0	—		6	3	18	7
Salernitana	2021–22	Serie A	7	0	—		—		—		—		7	0
Internacional (loan)	2022	Série A	0	0	—		—		1 (Note: Appearance (s) in Copa Sudamericana)	0	—		1	0
América Mineiro (loan)	2023	Série A	0	0	1	0	0	0	0	0	—		1	0
Career total			58	9	24	11	1	1	1	0	15	7	99	28
