= César Lucena =

Brazilian footballer (born 1980)

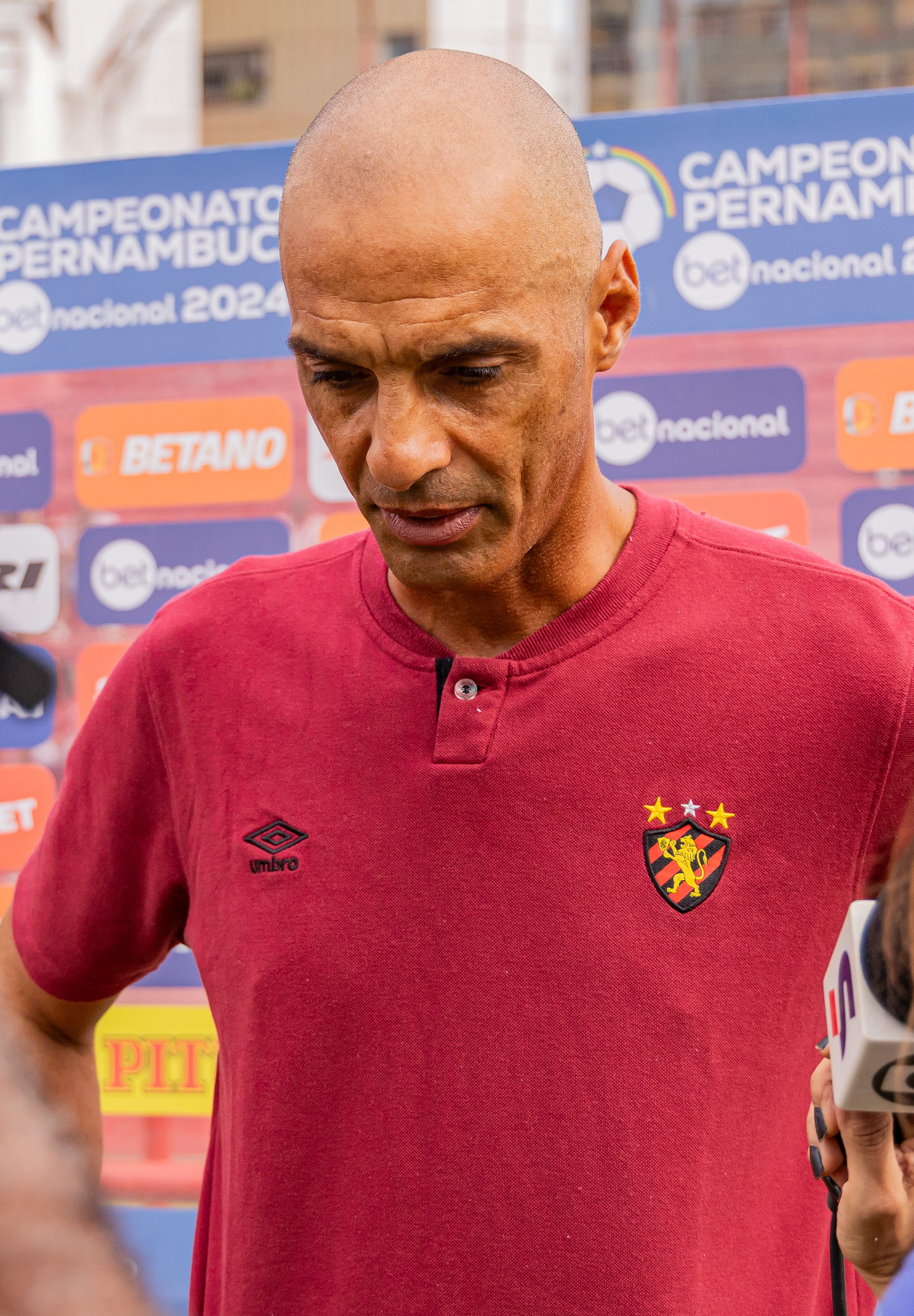
- Lucena in 2024

Personal information
- Full name: César Ricardo de Lucena
- Date of birth: 6 July 1980 (age 46)
- Place of birth: Guarulhos, Brazil
- Height: 1.88 m (6 ft 2 in)
- Position: Centre back

Team information
- Current team: Sport Recife (assistant)

Youth career
- Flamengo-SP

Senior career*
Years	Team	Apps	(Gls)
1999–2002	Flamengo-SP		
2002–2004	Portuguesa		
2003	→ Portuguesa Santista (loan)		
2005	Marília		
2005–2006	Guarani	35	(2)
2006	Asteras Tripolis	9	(0)
2007	Sport Recife	22	(2)
2008	Figueirense		
2008–2012	Sport Recife	130	(2)
2012–2013	Santa Cruz	9	(1)
2013–2014	América Mineiro	22	(1)
2015	Novo Hamburgo	6	(0)
2016	Aimoré	9	(0)

Managerial career
- 2018–2019: Sport Recife (assistant)
- 2019–2020: Sport Recife U20
- 2020–: Sport Recife (assistant)
- 2020: Sport Recife (interim)
- 2021: Sport Recife (interim)
- 2022: Sport Recife (interim)
- 2022: Sport Recife (interim)
- 2022: Sport Recife (interim)
- 2023: Sport Recife (interim)
- 2024: Sport Recife (interim)
- 2024: Sport Recife (interim)
- 2025: Sport Recife (interim)
- * Club domestic league appearances and goals

César Ricardo de Lucena (born 6 July 1980), known as César Lucena or simply César, is a Brazilian football coach and former player who played as a central defender. He is the current assistant coach of Sport Recife.

== Playing career ==
Born in Guarulhos, Lucena began his senior career with hometown side Flamengo-SP. In 2002, he moved to Portuguesa and also spent a short period at Portuguesa Santista.

In June 2005, Lucena joined Guarani from Marília, where he featured regularly. In 2006, he moved abroad for the first time in his career, joining Asteras Tripolis in the Football League Greece.

Lucena returned to Brazil in December 2006, after agreeing to a contract with Sport Recife. He left the club in the end of the following year after failing to agree new terms, and subsequently joined Figueirense; on 29 February 2008, however, he returned to Sport.

Lucena quickly established himself as a starter for the Leão, lifting the 2008 Copa do Brasil and three Campeonato Pernambucano titles in a row. He left the club in 2012, after struggling with injuries.

On 11 July 2012, after two months training to regain match fitness, Lucena signed a contract with Sport's rivals Santa Cruz. After failing to establish himself as a starter, he moved to América Mineiro on 1 April 2013.

Lucena left Coelho in the end of 2014, and subsequently represented clubs in the Rio Grande do Sul: Novo Hamburgo in 2015, and Aimoré in 2016.

== Managerial career ==
In April 2018, Lucena returned to Sport to work as one of Nelsinho Baptista's assistants. He remained at the club even after Nelsinho was fired, and was named interim manager in February 2019, after Milton Cruz was dismissed; however, he was not in charge of the first team in any matches, as Guto Ferreira was hired.

In August 2019, Lucena was named head coach of Sport's under-20 squad. He became an assistant of the main squad for the 2020 campaign, and in February 2020, after Ferreira was sacked, Lucena was named interim head coach of the main squad. After the appointment of Daniel Paulista as head coach, he returned to his previous role.

Lucena served as an interim head coach on seven further occasions, notably being in charge of Sport for the remaining nine matches of the club in the 2025 Série A.

== Honours ==
Sport

- Campeonato Pernambucano: 2007, 2008, 2009, 2010
- Copa do Brasil: 2008

Figueirense

- Campeonato Catarinense: 2008
