= 2013 Campeonato Paranaense =

Campeonato Paranaense - 1ª Divisão
- Season: 2013
- Champions: Coritiba
- Relegated: Paranavaí; Nacional
- Copa do Brasil: Coritiba; Atlético Paranaense; Londrina; Paraná
- Série D: Londrina; J. Malucelli
- Matches played: 136
- Goals scored: 351 (2.58 per match)
- Top goalscorer: Alex (Coritiba) (15 goals)

The 2013 Campeonato Paranaense de Futebol Profissional da 1ª Divisão was the 98th season of Paraná's top professional football league. The competition began on January 20 and ended on May 12. Coritiba won the championship for the 37th time, while Paranavaí and Nacional were relegated.

== Format ==
The tournament consists of a double round-robin format, in which all twelve teams play each other twice, with classification split in two stages. Each round counts as one stage.

The better-placed teams of each stage will face themselves in a two-legged tie, with the team with the most points in the overall classification playing the second leg home, the winning team will then be declared champion. In case of a tie in number of points and goal balance, the advantage is for the best campaign team. If the same team is best-placed on both stages, it will automatically be declared champion.

The best two-placed teams in the overall classification not advancing to the finals and not from Curitiba will face themselves in a two-legged tie competing for the Torneio do Interior. The team with the most points will play the second leg home. The bottom two teams on overall classification will be relegated.

== Participating teams ==
Club	Home city	2012 result
Arapongas	Arapongas	3rd
Atlético Paranaense	Curitiba	2nd
Cianorte	Cianorte	4th
Coritiba	Curitiba	1st
J. Malucelli	Curitiba	9th
Londrina	Londrina	5th
Nacional	Rolândia	2nd (2nd division)
Operário	Ponta Grossa	6th
Paranavaí	Paranavaí	10th
Paraná Clube	Curitiba	1st (2nd division)
Rio Branco	Paranaguá	8th
Toledo	Toledo	7th

== First round ==
Pos	Team	Pld	W	D	L	GF	GA	GD	Pts	Qualification
1	Coritiba (A)	11	8	3	0	23	4	+19	27	Advances to the Finals
2	Londrina	11	7	2	2	25	8	+17	23	
3	Paraná	11	5	5	1	15	8	+7	20	
4	J. Malucelli	11	5	2	4	14	13	+1	17	
5	Atlético Paranaense	11	3	5	3	13	11	+2	14	
6	Arapongas	11	2	8	1	11	8	+3	14	
7	Paranavaí	11	3	4	4	12	18	−6	13	
8	Toledo	11	2	6	3	13	12	+1	12	
9	Operário	11	2	6	3	11	14	−3	12	
10	Cianorte	11	3	2	6	11	16	−5	11	
11	Rio Branco-PR	11	2	4	5	9	23	−14	10	
12	Nacional-PR	11	0	1	10	6	28	−22	1	

Updated to match(es) played on 03 August 2013. Source: UOL Esporte
Rules for classification: 1st points; 2nd wins; 3rd goal difference; 4th goals scored; 5th red cards received; 6th yellow cards received; 7th public draw
(A) Advance to a further round

=== Results ===
Home \ Away	AEC	CAP	CIA	CTB	JMA	LON	NAC	OPE	ACP	PAR	RIB	TLD
Arapongas		1–1		1–1			3–0	1–1	0–0			0–0
Atlético Paranaense			2–1		3–1			3–0	0–0	0–1	1–1	
Cianorte	0–1			0–2		1–1				1–0	3–1	
Coritiba		2–1			1–0		2–0		4–1			3–1
J. Malucelli	2–1		1–0			0–2	2–0	3–2		2–2		
Londrina	1–1	2–0		0–1			4–0		3–1			4–2
Nacional-PR		1–1	1–3					0–1	3–4		1–2	
Operário			2–1	0–0		0–1				1–1		1–1
Paranavaí			1–1		1–0			1–1			0–3	2–1
Paraná	2–2			0–0		2–1	4–0		2–1		1–0	
Rio Branco-PR	0–0			0–7	0–2	0–6		2–2				0–0
Toledo		1–1	4–0		1–1		2–0			0–0		

Updated to match(es) played on 30 July 2013. Source:
Legend: Blue = home team win; Yellow = draw; Red = away team win.

== Second round ==
Pos	Team	Pld	W	D	L	GF	GA	GD	Pts	Qualification
1	Atlético Paranaense (A)	11	8	2	1	20	13	+7	26	Advances to the Finals
2	Londrina	11	8	1	2	19	7	+12	25	
3	Coritiba	11	6	3	2	26	13	+13	21	
4	Operário	11	6	3	2	21	10	+11	21	
5	Paraná	11	5	4	2	14	10	+4	19	
6	J. Malucelli	11	6	0	5	12	12	0	18	
7	Arapongas	11	4	1	6	15	19	−4	13	
8	Toledo	11	3	3	5	9	12	−3	12	
9	Rio Branco-PR	11	3	2	6	15	20	−5	11	
10	Cianorte	11	3	1	7	13	18	−5	10	
11	Nacional-PR	11	1	2	8	5	16	−11	5	
12	Paranavaí	11	1	2	8	5	24	−19	5	

Updated to match(es) played on 03 August 2013. Source: UOL Esporte
Rules for classification: 1st points; 2nd wins; 3rd goal difference; 4th goals scored; 5th red cards received; 6th yellow cards received; 7th public draw
(A) Advance to a further round

=== Results ===
Home \ Away	AEC	CAP	CIA	CTB	JMA	LON	NAC	OPE	ACP	PAR	RIB	TLD
Arapongas			1–3		0–3	2–3				0–0	2–1	
Atlético Paranaense	2–1			3–1		1–1	2–0					
Cianorte		1–2			0–1		2–2	0–3	3–0			0–1
Coritiba	3–2		2–0			3–1		1–1		2–3	6–0	
J. Malucelli		0–1		0–3					3–1		2–1	1–0
Londrina			2–0		3–0			0–1		1–0	1–0	
Nacional-PR	0–1			1–1	0–2	0–2				0–1		0–1
Operário	2–3	4–1			2–0		0–1		3–0		2–2	
Paranavaí	0–2	0–1		2–2		0–4	2–0			0–3		
Paraná		2–2	2–1		1–0			1–1				1–1
RIB		1–2	2–3				2–1		3–0	2–0		
Toledo	2–1			0–2		0–1		1–2	0–0		1–1	

Updated to match(es) played on 30 July 2013. Source:
Legend: Blue = home team win; Yellow = draw; Red = away team win.

== Finals ==
5 May 2013
15:30 UTC−03:00

Atlético Paranaense	2–2	Coritiba
Patric 12' (o.g.); Hernani 78'	Report	Deivid 4'; Geraldo 85'

Vila Olímpica, Curitiba
Attendance: 6,162
Referee: Edivaldo Elias da Silva

12 May 2012
15:50 UTC−03:00

Coritiba	3–1	Atlético Paranaense
Alex 29', 40'; Geraldo 90'	Report	Hernani 5'

Couto Pereira, Curitiba
Attendance: 24,872
Referee: Adriano Milczvski

== Torneio do Interior finals ==
5 May 2013
15:50 UTC−03:00

Operário	2–1	Londrina
Rone Dias 1'; Paulo Sergio 75'	Report	Weverton 59'

Germano Krüger, Ponta Grossa
Attendance: 1,683
Referee: Selmo Pedro dos Anjos Neto

12 May 2013
15:50 UTC−03:00

Londrina	2–1	Operário
Dirceu Wiggers 24'; Neilson Costa 66'	Report	Paulo Sérgio 39'

Estádio do Café, Londrina
Attendance: 16,667
Referee: Rodolpho Toski Marques
- Londrina was declared champion due to better results on the first and second round.
