= 2016 Campeonato Paranaense =

Campeonato Paranaense
- Season: 2016

The 2016 Campeonato Paranaense was the 101st season of Paraná's top professional football league. The competition began on January 30 and ends in May.

== Format ==
The tournament consists of a double round-robin format, in which all twelve teams play each other twice.

The top eight sides after all games have been played will advance to the final stages.

== Participating teams ==
Team	Stadium	Capacity
Atlético Paranaense	Arena da Baixada, Curitiba	42,372
Cascavel	Ninho das Cobras, Cascavel	28,125
Coritiba	Estádio Major Antônio Couto Pereira, Curitiba	40,310
Foz do Iguaçu	Estádio do ABC, Foz do Iguaçu	12,000
Grêmio Maringá	Estádio Willie Davids, Maringá	21,600
J. Malucelli	Eco-Estádio Janguito Malucelli, Curitiba	6,000
Londrina	Estádio do Café, Londrina	36,056
Operário	Estádio Vila Oficinas, Ponta Grossa	13,000
Paraná	Vila Capanema, Curitiba	20,000
PSTC	CT de Londrina, Londrina	1,000
Rio Branco	Estradinha, Paranaguá	8,000
Toledo	Estádio Municipal 14 de Dezembro, Toledo	15,280

== League table ==
Pos	Team	Pld	W	D	L	GF	GA	GD	Pts	Qualification or relegation
1	Paraná	6	5	0	1	12	5	+7	15	Qualification to the Play-offs
2	Londrina	6	4	1	1	8	3	+5	13	Qualification to the Play-offs
3	J. Malucelli	6	4	1	1	11	10	+1	13	Qualification to the Play-offs
4	Coritiba	6	3	2	1	17	7	+10	11	Qualification to the Play-offs
5	Atlético Paranaense	13	3	2	8	7	3	+4	11	Qualification to the Play-offs
6	Cascavel	6	2	1	3	10	13	−3	7	Qualification to the Play-offs
7	Foz do Iguaçu	5	2	0	3	8	13	−5	6	Qualification to the Play-offs
8	PSTC	6	1	2	3	7	8	−1	5	Qualification to the Play-offs
9	Grêmio Maringá	6	1	2	3	4	7	−3	5	
10	Rio Branco	6	1	1	4	8	12	−4	4	
11	Toledo	6	1	1	4	5	10	−5	4	Relegation to the 2017 Campeonato Paranaense (lower levels)
12	Operário	6	1	1	4	3	9	−6	4	Relegation to the 2017 Campeonato Paranaense (lower levels)

Updated to match(es) played on 26 February 2016. Source: Standings
Rules for classification: 1) points; 2) goal difference; 3) number of goals scored.
