= Bryam Gomes =

Brazilian footballer

Bryam
Personal information
- Full name: Bryam Gomes da Silva Nascimento
- Date of birth: 13 March 2001 (age 25)
- Place of birth: Guarujá, Brazil
- Height: 1.86 m (6 ft 1 in)
- Position: Forward

Team information
- Current team: Rio Branco-PR

Youth career
- 2018: Uberaba
- 2018–2019: Grêmio
- 2020–2022: Novorizontino

Senior career*
Years	Team	Apps	(Gls)
2020–2022	Novorizontino	3	(0)
2021	→ Catanduva (loan)	10	(1)
2022	→ PSTC (loan)	10	(0)
2022	→ Patriotas (loan)	0	(0)
2023	Bandeirante	13	(1)
2023	VOCEM	15	(1)
2023	ABECAT	11	(3)
2024	PSTC	11	(0)
2024–	Rio Branco-PR	13	(7)
2024–	→ Portuguesa (loan)	0	(0)
2024	→ Arapongas (loan)	4	(1)
- * Club domestic league appearances and goals as of 16:03, 19 August 2024 (UTC)

Bryam Gomes da Silva Nascimento (born 13 March 2001), known as Bryam Gomes or just Bryam, is a Brazilian footballer who plays as a forward for Rio Branco-PR.

== Career ==
Born in Guarujá, São Paulo, Bryam joined Grêmio's youth setup in 2018, from Uberaba. In 2020, he joined Novorizontino, making his first team debut in the year's Copa Paulista but being mainly used in the under-20 squad.

After being rarely used, Bryam served loans at Catanduva, PSTC and Patriotas, before moving to Bandeirante ahead of the 2023 season. In the remainder of that year, he also played for VOCEM and ABECAT, winning the Campeonato Goiano Terceira Divisão.

In March 2024, after another spell back at PSTC, Bryam was announced at Rio Branco-PR's squad for the year's Campeonato Paranaense Série Prata. After being the club's top scorer as they achieved promotion, he was loaned to Portuguesa on 8 August.

== Career statistics ==
As of 5 December 2024

Club	Season	League			State League		Cup		Continental		Other		Total	
Club	Season	Division	Apps	Goals	Apps	Goals	Apps	Goals	Apps	Goals	Apps	Goals	Apps	Goals
Novorizontino	2020	Série D	—		—		—		—		3 (Note: Appearance(s) in Copa Paulista)	0	3	0
Novorizontino	2021	Série C	3	0	—		—		—		—		3	0
Novorizontino	Total		3	0	—		—		—		3	0	6	0
Catanduva (loan)	2021	Paulista 2ª Divisão	—		10	1	—		—		—		10	1
PSTC (loan)	2022	Paranaense Série Prata	—		10	0	—		—		—		10	0
Patriotas (loan)	2022	Paranaense Série Bronze	—		0	0	—		—		—		0	0
Bandeirante	2023	Paulista A3	—		13	1	—		—		—		13	1
VOCEM	2023	Paulista 2ª Divisão	—		15	1	—		—		—		15	1
ABECAT	2023	Goiano 3ª Divisão	—		11	3	—		—		—		11	3
PSTC	2024	Paranaense	—		11	0	—		—		—		11	0
Rio Branco-PR	2024	Paranaense Série Prata	—		13	7	—		—		—		13	7
Portuguesa (loan)	2024	Paulista	—		—		—		—		5	0	5	0
Arapongas (loan)	2024	Paranaense Série Bronze	—		4	1	—		—		—		4	1
Career total			3	0	87	14	0	0	0	0	8	0	98	14
