= Kaito Kasuya =

Japanese footballer

Personal information
- Date of birth: 23 May 1998 (age 27)
- Place of birth: Tokyo, Japan
- Height: 1.72 m (5 ft 8 in)
- Position(s): Defender

Team information
- Current team: Toledo

Youth career
- 2014–2016: JP-Briobecca urayasu
- 2016–2019: Toledo
- –2018: Club Athletico Paranaense

Senior career*
Years	Team	Apps	(Gls)
2016	JP-Briobecca urayasu	1	(0)
2017–	Toledo	2	(0)
2019–	Toledo	3	(0)
2020–	Toledo	8	(0)
2021–	Toledo	3	(0)
2022–	Toledo	6	(0)
–2022	Nacional	5	(0)
2023–	Toledo	6	(0)
–2023	Clube Atlético Cambé	9	(0)
2023/24	Paraná Soccer Technical Center		(0)
–2024	JP-BrewKASHIMA	10	(0)
- *Club domestic league appearances and goals, correct as of 17:04, 14 March 2021 (UTC)

Kaito.K (カイト, Kaito Kasuya; 粕谷海土(海alternate))born 23 May 1998. He is a Japanese footballer currently playing as a defender for Toledo.

== Career statistics ==
=== Club ===
As of 14 March 2021.

Club	Season	League			State League		Cup		Other		Total	
Club	Season	Division	Apps	Goals	Apps	Goals	Apps	Goals	Apps	Goals	Apps	Goals
Toledo	2019	–			0	0	0	0	0	0	0	0
Toledo	2020	Série D	3	0	0	0	0	0	0	0	3	0
Toledo	2021	–			0	0	0	0	0	0	0	0
Career total			3	0	0	0	0	0	0	0	3	0
