= 2020 Campeonato Paranaense =

Campeonato Paranaense
- Season: 2020
- Dates: 18 January - 5 August
- Champions: Athletico Paranaense (26th title)
- Relegated: PSTC; União
- Copa do Brasil: Athletico Paranaense; Cianorte; Coritiba; FC Cascavel
- Série D: Cianorte; FC Cascavel; Rio Branco
- Matches: 80
- Goals: 200 (2.5 per match)
- Top goalscorer: Bissoli; Lucas Tocantins; Nikão; Pedrinho (6 goals each)

The 2020 Campeonato Paranaense (officially the Campeonato Paranaense de Futebol Profissional da 1ª Divisão - Temporada 2020) was the 106th edition of the top division of football in the state of Paraná organized by FPF. The competition started on 18 January and ended on 5 August.

On 16 March 2020, FPF suspended the Campeonato Paranaense indefinitely due to the COVID-19 pandemic in Brazil. Complying with the guidelines of the Governo do Estado do Paraná, the tournament resumed behind closed doors on 18 July 2020.

Athletico Paranaense, the defending champions, won their 26th title after defeating Coritiba 3–1 on aggregate.

== Format ==
In the first stage, each team played the other eleven teams in a single round-robin tournament. The teams were ranked according to points.

If tied on points, the following criteria would be used to determine the ranking: 1. Wins; 2. Goal difference; 3. Goals scored; 4. Head-to-head results; 5. Fewest red cards; 6. Fewest yellow cards; 7. Draw in the headquarters of the FPF.

Top eight teams advanced to the quarter-finals of the final stages. The bottom two teams were relegated to the second division. Top three teams not already qualified for 2021 Série A, Série B or Série C qualified for 2021 Série D.

Final stage was played on a home-and-away two-legged basis, with the best overall performance team hosting the second leg. If tied on aggregate, the penalty shoot-out would be used to determine the winner. Top four teams qualified for the 2021 Copa do Brasil.

== Participating teams ==
Club	Home city	2019 result	Titles (last)
Athletico Paranaense	Curitiba	1st	25 (2019)
Cascavel CR	Cascavel	9th	0
Cianorte	Cianorte	10th	0
Coritiba	Curitiba	3rd	38 (2017)
FC Cascavel	Cascavel	7th	0
Londrina	Londrina	4th	4 (2014)
Operário Ferroviário	Ponta Grossa	5th	1 (2015)
Paraná	Curitiba	6th	7 (2006)
PSTC	Cornélio Procópio	1st (Seg.)	0
Rio Branco	Paranaguá	8th	0
Toledo	Toledo	2nd	0
União	Francisco Beltrão	2nd (Seg.)	0

== First stage ==
Pos	Team	Pld	W	D	L	GF	GA	GD	Pts	Qualification or relegation
1	Coritiba	11	7	3	1	24	10	+14	24	Advance to Quarter-finals
2	FC Cascavel	11	7	2	2	20	12	+8	23	Advance to Quarter-finals
3	Athletico Paranaense	11	7	1	3	22	13	+9	22	Advance to Quarter-finals
4	Operário Ferroviário	11	6	2	3	12	10	+2	20	Advance to Quarter-finals
5	Cianorte	11	5	3	3	15	10	+5	18	Advance to Quarter-finals
6	Londrina	11	4	3	4	14	16	−2	15	Advance to Quarter-finals
7	Rio Branco	11	3	5	3	12	11	+1	14	Advance to Quarter-finals
8	Paraná	11	3	4	4	9	8	+1	13	Advance to Quarter-finals
9	Cascavel CR	11	3	2	6	10	20	−10	11	
10	Toledo	11	2	4	5	8	13	−5	10	
11	PSTC	11	1	3	7	7	15	−8	6	Relegation to 2021 Campeonato Paranaense - Segunda Divisão
12	União	11	1	2	8	8	23	−15	5	Relegation to 2021 Campeonato Paranaense - Segunda Divisão

Source: FPF

== Final stage ==
=== Bracket ===
Quarter-finals
6	Londrina	1	0	1
3	Athletico Paranaense	1	5	6
7	Rio Branco	0	0	0
2	FC Cascavel	3	5	8
5	Cianorte	0	2	2
4	Operário Ferroviário	1	0	1
8	Paraná	0	1	1
1	Coritiba	1	2	3

Semi-finals
3	Athletico Paranaense	5	0	5
2	FC Cascavel	1	0	1
5	Cianorte	2	0	2
1	Coritiba	3	2	5

Finals
3	Athletico Paranaense	1	2	3
1	Coritiba	0	1	1

=== Quarter-finals ===
Team 1	Agg.	Team 2	1st leg	2nd leg
Paraná	1–3	Coritiba	0–1	1–2
Rio Branco	0–8	FC Cascavel	0–3	0–5
Londrina	1–6	Athletico Paranaense	1–1	0–5
Cianorte	2–1	Operário Ferroviário	0–1	2–0

==== Group A ====
19 July 2020
16:00

Paraná	0–1	Coritiba
	Report	Robson 50'

Estádio Vila Capanema, Curitiba (Note: Originally scheduled to be played at Estádio Germano Krüger, Ponta Grossa, FPF moved the match to Estádio Vila Capanema, Curitiba prior authorization from the Prefeitura Municipal de Curitiba.)
Attendance: 0
Referee: Rodolpho Toski Marques

23 July 2020
21:00

Coritiba	2–1	Paraná
Patrick Vieira 8'; Igor Jesus 71'	Report	Fabrício 27' (pen.)

Estádio Couto Pereira, Curitiba
Attendance: 0
Referee: Paulo Roberto Alves Júnior

Coritiba qualified for the semi-finals.

==== Group B ====
18 July 2020
14:00

Rio Branco	0–3	FC Cascavel
	Report	Lucas Tocantins 1', 89'; Magno Ribeiro 72' (pen.)

Estádio Germano Krüger, Ponta Grossa (Note: As a measure to prevent the spread of COVID-19, the Governo do Estado do Paraná banned any professional football match in the coastal cities until 21 July 2020. Therefore, FPF moved the match from Estádio Nelson Medrado Dias, Paranaguá to Estádio Germano Krüger, Ponta Grossa.)
Attendance: 0
Referee: Leonardo Ferreira Lima

22 July 2020
18:00

FC Cascavel	5–0	Rio Branco
Adenilson 22'; Lucas Tocantins 35'; Henrique Santos 43'; Oberdan 53'; Sananduva 69'	Report

Estádio Olímpico Regional Arnaldo Busatto, Cascavel
Attendance: 0
Referee: Robson Babinski

FC Cascavel qualified for the semi-finals.

==== Group C ====
19 July 2020
18:00

Londrina	1–1	Athletico Paranaense
Júnior Pirambu 89'	Report	Léo Cittadini 47'

Estádio Municipal Ubirajara Medeiros, Cornélio Procópio (Note: As a measure to prevent the spread of COVID-19, the Prefeitura de Londrina banned indefinitely any professional football match in Londrina. Therefore, FPF moved the match from Estádio do Café, Londrina to Estádio Municipal Ubirajara Medeiros, Cornélio Procópio.)
Attendance: 0
Referee: Paulo Roberto Alves Júnior

23 July 2020
17:00

Athletico Paranaense	5–0	Londrina
Nikão 3', 20'; Marquinhos Gabriel 6'; Bissoli 39', 41'	Report

Arena da Baixada, Curitiba
Attendance: 0
Referee: Rodolpho Toski Marques

Athletico Paranaense qualified for the semi-finals.

==== Group D ====
18 July 2020
16:00

Cianorte	0–1	Operário Ferroviário
	Report	Douglas Coutinho 71'

Estádio Municipal Olímpico Albino Turbay, Cianorte
Attendance: 0
Referee: Leonardo Sígari Zanon

22 July 2020
20:00

Operário Ferroviário	0–2	Cianorte
	Report	Maurício Ribeiro 19'; Júnior Prego 73'

Estádio Germano Krüger, Ponta Grossa
Attendance: 0
Referee: Lucas Paulo Torezin

Cianorte qualified for the semi-finals.

=== Semi-finals ===
Team 1	Agg.	Team 2	1st leg	2nd leg
Cianorte	2–5	Coritiba	2–3	0–2
Athletico Paranaense	5–1	FC Cascavel	5–1	0–0

==== Group E ====
26 July 2020
16:00

Cianorte	2–3	Coritiba
Pelezinho 48'; França 83'	Report	William Matheus 19', 43'; Gabriel 22'

Estádio Municipal Olímpico Albino Turbay, Cianorte
Attendance: 0
Referee: Leonardo Ferreira Lima

29 July 2020
20:00

Coritiba	2–0	Cianorte
Rafinha 56'; Maurício Ribeiro 67' (o.g.)	Report

Estádio Couto Pereira, Curitiba
Attendance: 0
Referee: Adriano Milczvski

Coritiba qualified for the finals.

==== Group F ====
26 July 2020
18:00

Athletico Paranaense	5–1	FC Cascavel
Lucas Halter 23'; Bissoli 34', 70'; Nikão 46'; Marquinhos Gabriel 59'	Report	Henrique Santos 44'

Arena da Baixada, Curitiba
Attendance: 0
Referee: Leonardo Sígari Zanon

29 July 2020
18:00

FC Cascavel	0–0	Athletico Paranaense
	Report

Estádio Olímpico Regional Arnaldo Busatto, Cascavel
Attendance: 0
Referee: Lucas Paulo Torezin

Athletico Paranaense qualified for the finals.

=== Finals ===
Team 1	Agg.	Team 2	1st leg	2nd leg
Athletico Paranaense	3–1	Coritiba	1–0	2–1

==== Group G ====
2 August 2020
16:00

Athletico Paranaense	1–0	Coritiba
Léo Cittadini 89'	Report

Arena da Baixada, Curitiba
Attendance: 0
Referee: Paulo Roberto Alves Júnior

5 August 2020
20:00

Coritiba	1–2	Athletico Paranaense
Sabino 45+4' (pen.)	Report	Khellven 90+1'; Nikão 90+2'

Estádio Couto Pereira, Curitiba
Attendance: 0
Referee: Rodolpho Toski Marques

== Overall table ==
Pos	Team	Pld	W	D	L	GF	GA	GD	Pts	Qualification or relegation
1	Athletico Paranaense	17	11	3	3	36	16	+20	36	Champions and 2021 Copa do Brasil
2	Coritiba	17	11	3	3	33	16	+17	36	Runners-up and 2021 Copa do Brasil
3	FC Cascavel	15	9	3	3	29	17	+12	30	2021 Copa do Brasil and 2021 Série D
4	Cianorte	15	6	3	6	19	16	+3	21	2021 Copa do Brasil and 2021 Série D
5	Operário Ferroviário	13	7	2	4	13	12	+1	23	
6	Londrina	13	4	4	5	15	22	−7	16	
7	Rio Branco	13	3	5	5	12	19	−7	14	2021 Série D
8	Paraná	13	3	4	6	10	11	−1	13	
9	Cascavel CR	11	3	2	6	10	20	−10	11	
10	Toledo	11	2	4	5	8	13	−5	10	
11	PSTC	11	1	3	7	7	15	−8	6	Relegation to 2021 Campeonato Paranaense - Segunda Divisão
12	União	11	1	2	8	8	23	−15	5	Relegation to 2021 Campeonato Paranaense - Segunda Divisão

Source: FPF

== Top goalscorers ==
No.	Player	Club	Goals
1	Bissoli	Athletico Paranaense	6
1	Lucas Tocantins	FC Cascavel	6
1	Nikão	Athletico Paranaense	6
1	Pedrinho	Athletico Paranaense	6
5	Douglas Coutinho	Operário Ferroviário	5
5	Pelezinho	Cianorte	5
5	Rone	Cascavel CR	5
8	Magno Ribeiro	FC Cascavel	4
8	Paulo Sérgio	FC Cascavel	4
8	Rafinha	Coritiba	4
8	Robson	Coritiba	4
