= Lucas Sena =

Brazilian footballer

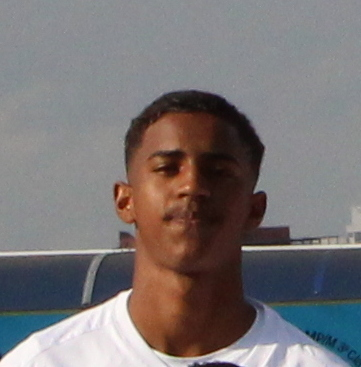
- Lucas Sena with Santos in 2019

Personal information
- Full name: Lucas Sena Silva
- Date of birth: 31 January 2001 (age 25)
- Place of birth: São Paulo, Brazil
- Height: 1.75 m (5 ft 9 in)
- Position: Left back

Team information
- Current team: St. Lucia
- Number: 11

Youth career
- 2012–2021: Santos

Senior career*
Years	Team	Apps	(Gls)
2022–2023	Santos	0	(0)
2022	→ Rio Branco-PR (loan)	8	(0)
2023	→ Atlético Catarinense (loan)	0	(0)
2023	→ Patriotas-PR (loan)	4	(1)
2023–	St. Lucia	15	(2)
- * Club domestic league appearances and goals as of 13 May 2024

Lucas Sena Silva (born 31 January 2001), known as Lucas Sena, is a Brazilian footballer who plays for Maltese Premier League side St. Lucia. Mainly a left back, he can also play as a forward.

== Club career ==
Born in São Paulo, Sena joined Santos' youth setup in 2011, aged ten. On 17 May 2018, he signed his first professional contract with the club, agreeing to a three-year deal.

On 14 February 2020, Sena agreed to a new contract with the club, running until 2023. On 21 July, he was registered for the year's Campeonato Paulista.

Sena subsequently played for Santos' B-team and moved out on loan to Rio Branco-PR for the 2022 Campeonato Paranaense on 30 November 2021. He made his professional debut on 27 January 2022, starting in a 1–2 away loss against Cianorte.

Sena returned to Peixe when his loan expired, but was not included in the first team squad. On 15 February 2023, he moved to Atlético Catarinense on loan until the end of the 2023 Campeonato Catarinense.

On 22 March 2023, after making no appearances for Atlético Catarinense, Sena moved to Patriotas-PR on loan until the end of the year's Campeonato Paranaense Série Prata. He scored his first senior goal on 1 July, netting the winner in a 3–2 away win over PSTC.

== Career statistics ==
As of 5 February 2024

Club	Season	League			State League		Cup		Continental		Other		Total	
Club	Season	Division	Apps	Goals	Apps	Goals	Apps	Goals	Apps	Goals	Apps	Goals	Apps	Goals
Santos	2022	Série A	0	0	—		0	0	—		—		0	0
Rio Branco-PR (loan)	2022	Paranaense	—		8	0	—		—		—		8	0
Atlético Catarinense (loan)	2023	Catarinense	—		0	0	—		—		—		0	0
Patriotas-PR (loan)	2023	Paranaense Série Prata	—		4	1	—		—		—		4	1
St. Lucia	2023–24	Maltese Premier League	9	1	—		—		—		—		9	1
Career total			9	1	12	1	0	0	0	0	0	0	21	2
