= Rogério Micale =

Brazilian football coach (born 1969)

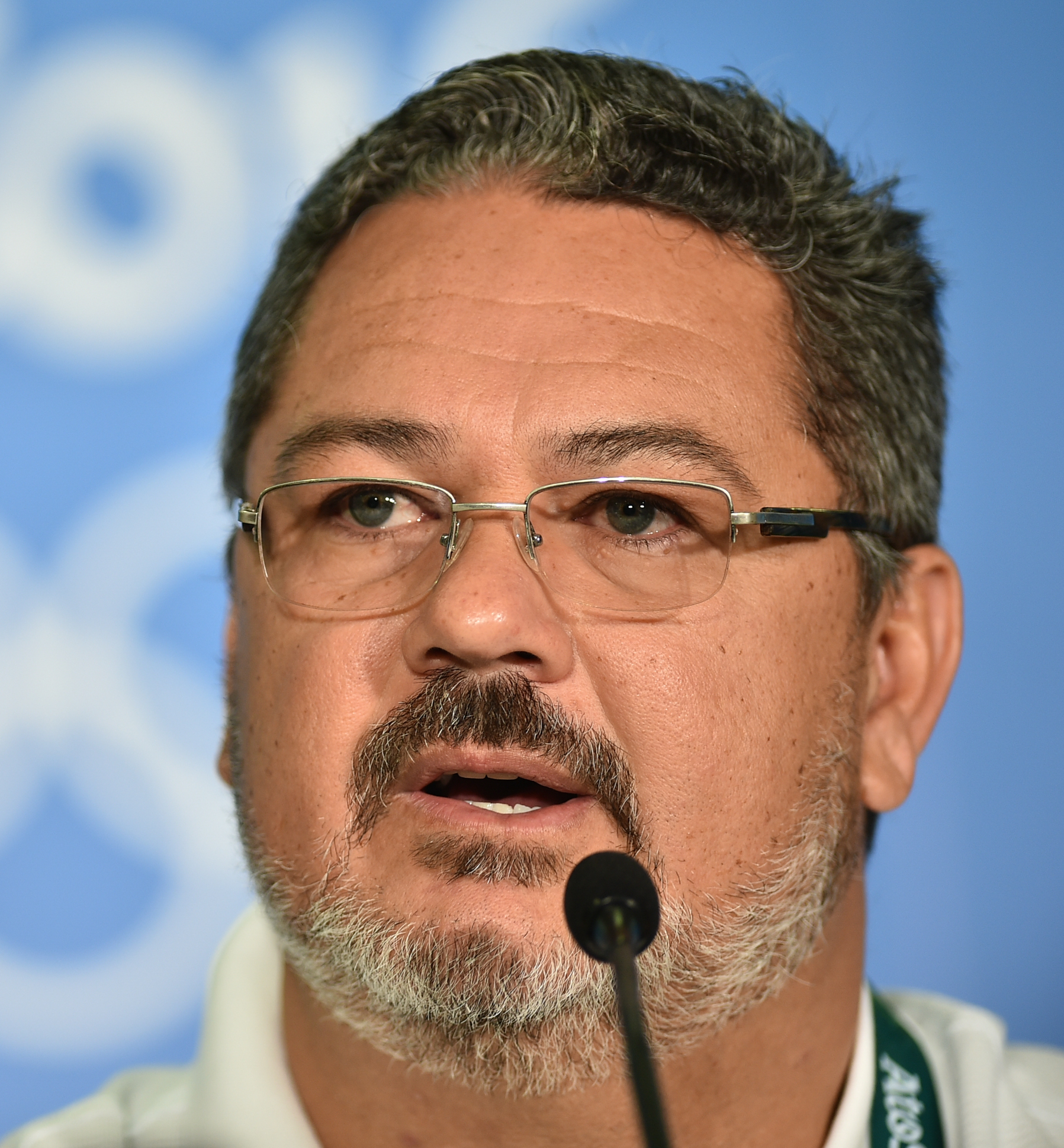
- Micale in 2016

Personal information
- Full name: Mário Rogério Reis Micale
- Date of birth: 28 March 1969 (age 57)
- Place of birth: Salvador, Brazil
- Position: Goalkeeper

Senior career*
Years	Team	Apps	(Gls)
1989	Portuguesa Londrinense		
1990–1991	Londrina		
1992	Apucarana		
1992	Operário Ferroviário		

Managerial career
- 1999–2001: Portuguesa Londrinense U20
- 2001: ADAP U20
- 2001–2002: Marcílio Dias U20
- 2002: ADAP U20
- 2002–2003: Londrina U20
- 2004: Portuguesa Londrinense U20
- 2004: Londrina U20
- 2005–2008: Figueirense U20
- 2007: Figueirense (interim)
- 2009–2010: Atlético Mineiro U20
- 2011: Grêmio Prudente
- 2011–2015: Atlético Mineiro U20
- 2015–2017: Brazil U20
- 2015–2016: Brazil U23
- 2017: Atlético Mineiro
- 2018: Paraná
- 2018: Figueirense
- 2020: Cruzeiro U20
- 2020: Paraná
- 2020–2021: Al Hilal U19
- 2021: Al Hilal
- 2021–2022: Al Dhafra
- 2022–2024: Egypt U23
- 2024: Egypt U20
- 2026: Londrina
Medal record
Men's football
Representing Brazil (as head coach)
Olympic Games
Gold medal – first place	2016 Rio de Janeiro	Team
Pan American Games
Bronze medal – third place	2015 Toronto	Team
- * Club domestic league appearances and goals

Mário Rogério Reis Micale (born 28 March 1969), known as Rogério Micale, is a Brazilian professional football coach and former player.

Micale played as a goalkeeper before starting his coaching career in 1999. He notably led the Brazil national under-23 team to their first-ever title of the Olympic Games in 2016, before being subsequently in charge of Série A sides Atlético Mineiro and Paraná.

== Playing career ==
Born in Salvador, Bahia, Micale moved to Londrina, Paraná on his teens, and began his career with Portuguesa Londrinense in 1989. Known as Aranha during his playing days, he also represented Londrina EC, Apucarana and Operário Ferroviário before retiring at the age of just 23, in 1992.

== Coaching career ==
=== Early career ===
Micale started his coaching career in 1999 with his first club Portuguesa, being a youth coach. He remained in the state of Paraná in the following years, always in charge of youth teams, before joining Figueirense in 2005 as a head coach of the under-20 team.

In February 2007, Micale was named interim head coach of Figueira, replacing sacked Heriberto da Cunha. He coached the side on three matches before returning to his previous role, after the appointment of Mário Sérgio; he was also in charge on one further match, as Mário Sérgio was recovering from an appendicitis. Back with the under-20s, he won the 2008 Copa São Paulo de Futebol Júnior, the club's first-ever title in the competition.

On 13 January 2009, Micale was named the under-20 coach of Atlético Mineiro. On 31 December 2010, he was appointed head coach of Grêmio Prudente, but his reign only lasted 21 days and two matches.

=== Brazil national team ===
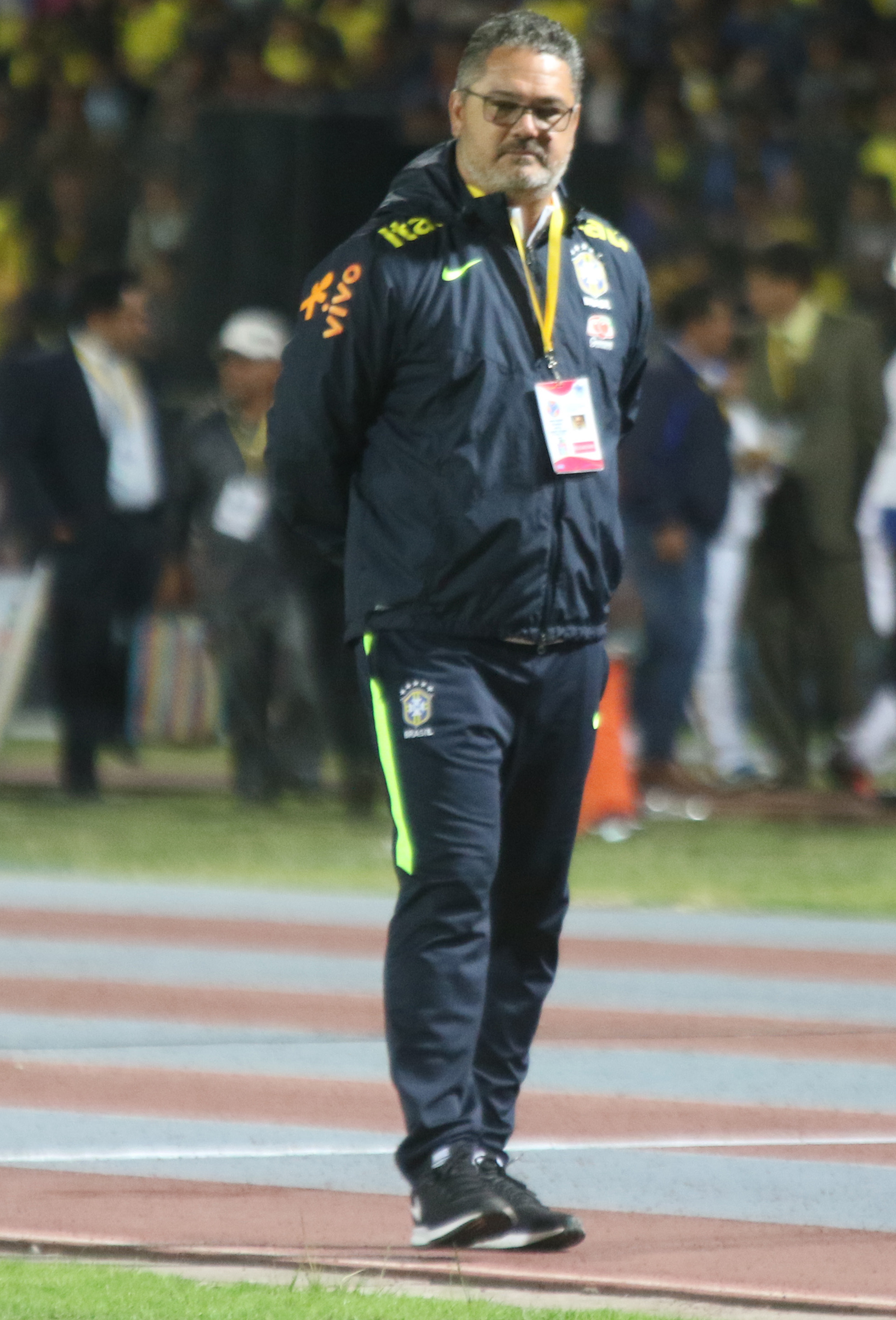
Micale coaching the Brazil national under-20 team in 2017

Micale subsequently returned to Atlético and their youth team, before being named head coach of the Brazil national under-20 team in the place Alexandre Gallo on 9 May 2015. He achieved a second place in the 2015 FIFA U-20 World Cup, and also was the head coach of the under-23s during the 2015 Pan American Games and the 2016 Summer Olympics, winning the latter for the first time in the country's history.

On 20 February 2017, Micale was dismissed by the CBF after failing to qualify the under-20s for the year's FIFA U-20 World Cup.

=== Atlético Mineiro ===
On 21 July 2017, Micale returned to Atlético, now appointed head coach of the first team. He was fired on 24 September, after a 3–1 home defeat to Vitória.

=== Paraná ===
On 24 February 2018, Micale replaced Wagner Lopes at the helm of Paraná. He sacked on 14 August, after ten losses in 18 matches.

=== Figueirense ===
On 10 September 2018, Micale returned to Figueirense after nearly ten years, being now a first team head coach; he replaced dismissed Milton Cruz. On 28 November, after just one win in 12 matches, he was himself relieved of his duties.

=== Paraná return ===
Micale then spent seven months in charge of Cruzeiro's under-20 team, and returned to Paraná on 3 November 2020. He was sacked on 2 December, less than one month after arriving, after six winless matches.

=== Al Hilal ===
Shortly after leaving Paraná, Micale joined Saudi club Al Hilal to take over the under-19 team. In February 2021, he replaced Răzvan Lucescu at the helm of the first team.

Despite being named Manager of the Month in March 2021, Micale was himself replaced by José Morais on 2 May.

=== Al Dhafra ===
On 2 October 2021, Micale was appointed manager of Emirati club Al Dhafra, with the club in the 11th place in the league. He was sacked the following 2 March, as the side was sitting in the 12th place and still under threat of relegation.

=== Egypt national team ===
In August 2022, Micale was appointed as head coach of the Egypt U23 national team. In October 2024, he became the head coach of Egypt U20 national team, a position he held until 31 December of the same year.

=== Londrina ===
On 8 May 2026, Micale returned to Brazil and took over a club he represented as a player, Londrina. He was sacked on 10 October, with the club seriously threatened with relegation.

== Honours ==
Figueirense

- Copa São Paulo de Futebol Júnior: 2008

Atlético Mineiro

- Taça Belo Horizonte de Juniores: 2009, 2011

Brazil Olympic

- Summer Olympics Gold medal: 2016

Brazil

- Pan American Games Bronze medal: 2015

Individual

- Saudi Professional League Manager of the Month: March 2021
