= Paulo Comelli (footballer) =

Brazilian football manager

Personal information
- Full name: Paulo Sérgio Comelli
- Date of birth: 5 June 1960 (age 66)
- Place of birth: Novo Horizonte, Brazil
- Position: Centre-back

Senior career*
Years	Team	Apps	(Gls)
1980–1985	Joinville		
1986–1987	Botafogo-SP		
1988	Brasília		
1989	Matsubara		

Managerial career
- 1990–1991: Grêmio Maringá
- 1992: Votuporanguense
- 1992: Real Beltronense
- 1993: Jaboticabal
- 1993: Coronel Vivida
- 1994: Mirassol
- 1995: Batel
- 1995: União Mogi
- 1996: União Bandeirante
- 1997: União Mogi
- 1997: Tuna Luso
- 1998: Ponta Grossa
- 1998: Gama
- 1998: Taubaté
- 1998: Vila Nova
- 1999: Londrina
- 2000: São Bento
- 2000: União São João
- 2001: São Bento
- 2001: XV de Piracicaba
- 2001: Sampaio Corrêa
- 2002: União Barbarense
- 2002: Criciúma
- 2002: Sampaio Corrêa
- 2003: União Barbarense
- 2003: Marília
- 2004: Ituano
- 2004: Portuguesa
- 2005: Figueirense
- 2005: Noroeste
- 2005: Ceilândia
- 2006–2007: Noroeste
- 2007: Marília
- 2007: São Caetano
- 2007: Marília
- 2007: Ponte Preta
- 2008: Bahia
- 2008–2009: Paraná
- 2009: Bahia
- 2010: Oeste
- 2010: Sertãozinho
- 2010: Vila Nova
- 2010–2011: Remo
- 2011–2012: CRB
- 2012–2013: Criciúma
- 2013: América Mineiro
- 2013–2016: Emirates
- 2016–2018: Dibba Al Fujairah
- 2019: Khor Fakkan
- 2023–2024: Al Dhafra
- 2025: Noroeste
- * Club domestic league appearances and goals

Paulo Sérgio Comelli (born 5 June 1960) is a Brazilian football coach and former player who played as a centre-back.

== Playing career ==
Born in Novo Horizonte, São Paulo, Comelli began his career with Joinville in 1980. He moved to Botafogo-SP for the 1986 season, and later played for Brasília and Matsubara before retiring at the end of the 1989 season, aged 29.

== Coaching career ==
Shortly after retiring Comelli took up coaching, being named Grêmio Maringá head coach in 1990. In 1992, he was in charge of Votuporanguense and later Real Beltronense, achieving a first-ever promotion to the Campeonato Paranaense with the latter (which was later replaced by Francisco Beltrão FC). He repeated the feat with Coronel Vivida in the following year, after a short stint at Jaboticabal.

Comelli would continue to coach in both São Paulo and Paraná states in the following years, being in charge of Mirassol, Batel, União Mogi (two stints) and União Bandeirante. In 1997, he was named head coach of Tuna Luso in the Série B, and led the club to the third stage of the competition.

In the 1998 campaign, Comelli coached Ponta Grossa in the Paranaense, was Gama's third coach of the season but only lasted three matches, led Taubaté to the finals of the Campeonato Paulista Série A3 (missing out promotion after losing the title to São Caetano), and ended the year at Vila Nova.

After spending the 1999 season at the helm of Londrina, Comelli coached São Bento for a short period in 2000 before joining União São João. Sacked on 4 September, he returned to São Bento in 2001, winning the year's Paulista A3. In the remainder of the year, he was also in charge of XV de Piracicaba and Sampaio Corrêa in the second division.

In 2002, Comelli became União Barbarense's third head coach during the 2002 Campeonato Paulista, and managed to avoid relegation. He was named Criciúma head coach in May of that year, but was sacked on 1 July.

Comelli subsequently returned to Sampaio, winning the 2002 Campeonato Maranhense but was later replaced by Arturzinho. He returned to Barbarense for the 2003 campaign, but resigned on 19 February to join Marília, where he was dismissed in October.

Comelli began the 2004 season in charge of Ituano, but was hired by Portuguesa on 29 March. Sacked on 12 August, he replaced Dorival Júnior at Figueirense on 21 December.

Sacked by Figueira in March 2005, Comelli led Noroeste to the finals (and promotion) of the Campeonato Paulista Série A2. He left for Ceilândia for the year's Série C, before returning to his previous club in December.

On 8 April 2007, Comelli returned to Marília, but left to join São Caetano on 3 July. Dismissed on 16 August, he returned to Marília four days later.

Comelli resigned from MAC on 18 September 2007, and replaced Nelsinho Baptista at the helm of Ponte Preta six days later. He was sacked from the latter on 20 November, and was announced as Bahia head coach on 4 December.

Sacked by Bahia on 3 June 2008, Comelli was named Paraná head coach on 7 August. He resigned from the club on 8 March 2009, and returned to Bahia on 8 July, but was again dismissed on 2 August.

After beginning the 2010 season in charge of Oeste, Comelli was dismissed on 3 February of that year, during the half-time of a match against Paulista. The following day, he was named Sertãozinho head coach, but was unable to avoid relegation from the 2010 Campeonato Paulista, and subsequently only lasted three matches in charge of Vila Nova.

On 1 December 2010, Comelli was named head coach of Remo, but was sacked the following 16 May. Named in charge of CRB on 19 September 2011, he left the club to return to Criciúma on 19 April of the following year.

Dismissed by Tigre on 3 March 2013, Comelli was appointed América Mineiro head coach nine days later, but was also sacked on 4 September. He then moved abroad for the first time in his career, joining UAE Pro League side Emirates Club in December.

After leaving Emirates in June 2016, Comelli agreed to become Dibba Al Fujairah manager on 12 December, being sacked on 26 October 2018. He later took over Khor Fakkan on 17 July, but was also dismissed on 30 October.

Comelli returned to Brazil in September 2020, and spent a period without a club before returning to the United Arab Emirates on 4 December 2023, to manage UAE Division 1 side Al Dhafra. On 8 November 2024, he was confirmed as Noroeste's head coach for the 2025 Campeonato Paulista, replacing Moisés Egert.

On 3 February 2025, Comelli was sacked by Norusca after six matches into the 2025 Campeonato Paulista.

== Honours ==
=== Player ===
Joinville

- Campeonato Catarinense: 1981, 1982, 1983, 1984

=== Manager ===
Gama

- Campeonato Brasiliense: 1998

Londrina

- Campeonato Paranaense Série Prata: 1999

São Bento

- Campeonato Paulista Série A3: 2001

Sampaio Corrêa

- Campeonato Maranhense: 2002

Figueirense

- Campeonato Catarinense: 2004

CRB

- Campeonato Alagoano: 2012
