= Nílton de Sordi =

Brazilian footballer (1931–2013)

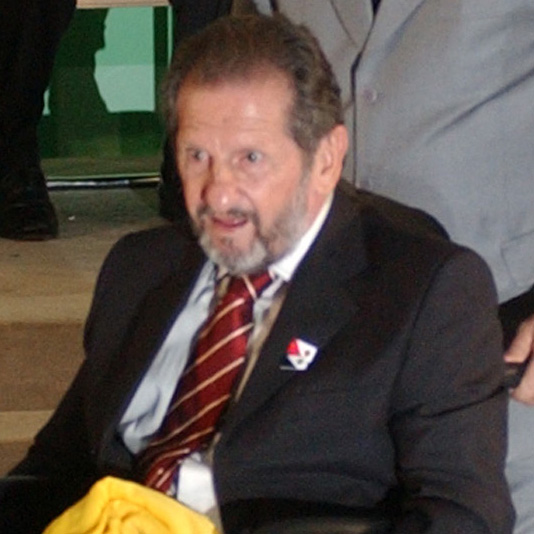
- De Sordi in 2008

Personal information
- Full name: Nílton de Sordi
- Date of birth: 14 February 1931
- Place of birth: Piracicaba, Brazil
- Date of death: 24 August 2013 (aged 82)
- Place of death: Bandeirantes, Brazil
- Position: Right-back

Senior career*
Years	Team	Apps	(Gls)
1949–1952	XV de Piracicaba	?	(?)
1952–1965	São Paulo	536	(12)
1965	União Bandeirante	?	(?)

International career
1954–1961	Brazil	22	(0)

Managerial career
- União Bandeirante
Medal record
Men's Football
Representing Brazil
FIFA World Cup
Winner	1958 Sweden
- * Club domestic league appearances and goals

Nílton de Sordi (14 February 1931 – 24 August 2013), sometimes known as just De Sordi, was a Brazilian footballer who played as a right-back.

== Career ==
De Sordi earned 22 caps for the Brazil national team. He was part of the 1958 FIFA World Cup winning squad, and played in all matches except the final. During his club career, he played for XV de Piracicaba-SP and São Paulo.

== Death ==
De Sordi died of multiple organ failure on 24 August 2013 in Bandeirantes, Brazil.

== Honours ==
São Paulo

- Campeonato Paulista: 1953, 1957

Brazil

- FIFA World Cup: 1958

Individual

- Torneio Octogonal Rivadavia Correa Meyer Team of the Tournament: 1953
- Campeonato Paulista Team of the Tournament: 1953, 1954
- Campeonato Paulista Player of the Tournament: 1954
- Torneio Rio-São Paulo Team of the Tournament: 1954
