= Adap Galo Maringá Futebol Clube =

Adap Galo Maringá
- Full name: Adap Galo Maringá Futebol Clube
- Nickname(s): Galo
- Founded: 21 March 2005
- Dissolved: 5 November 2008; 16 years ago
- Ground: Willie Davids
- Capacity: 23,000
- 2007: Eliminated in first stage (Série C)
Home colours	Away colours

Adap Galo Maringá Futebol Clube, commonly referred to as Adap Galo Maringá or simply Adap Galo, was a Brazilian football club from Maringá, Paraná state. The club competed in the Brazilian Championship Third Division in 2007, but it was dissolved after 2008 season.

== History ==
Founded on 21 March 2005, with the support of a businesspeople group, as Galo Maringá Futebol Clube already won the 2nd tier of Campeonato Paranaense in the same year.

After that, participated for the 1st time of the Campeonato Paranaense 1st tier in 2006.

On 25 November 2006, two Paraná state clubs, ADAP from Campo Mourão city, and Galo Maringá from Maringá city, fused, and the new club was named Adap Galo Maringá Futebol Clube. The club kept the same colors and kits of Galo Maringá and its new logo similar to Galo Maringá's, but including the words "ADAP" and "1999" to honor the defunct club.

On 14 January 2007, Adap Galo Maringá played its first official match, against Nacional of Rolândia, at Willie Davids Stadium, Maringá and won 3–1. This was also the club's first Campeonato Paranaense match. In the same year, the club competed in the Brazilian Championship Third Division, but was eliminated in the first stage. On 5 November 2008 the club sent a letter to the Paraná Federation quitting football competition and since then the club is dissolved.

== Stadium ==
Adap Galo Maringá's home stadium was Willie Davids stadium, inaugurated in 1957, with a maximum capacity of 23,000 people.

The club also owned a training ground, in Campo Mourão.

== Club colors ==
Adap Galo's colors were black and white, which were the colors of Galo Maringá.
