= Yohei Iwasaki =

Japanese footballer (born 1987)

Personal information
- Full name: Yohei Iwasaki
- Date of birth: March 24, 1987 (age 39)
- Place of birth: Tsu, Mie, Japan
- Height: 1.83 m (6 ft 0 in)
- Position: Defender

Team information
- Current team: Al Shabab Club
- Number: 34

Youth career
- 2005–2006: Chukyo University

Senior career*
Years	Team	Apps	(Gls)
2008	Camboriú		
2009	Paranavaí		
2009	Serrano		
2009	Pato Branco		
2010	Paraná		
2010–2011	Albirex Niigata	15	(0)
2012	FC Ganju Iwate	7	(6)
2012–2013	Independiente Campo Grande		
2013	Rangdajied United	18	(2)
2014	FC Gifu	2	(0)
2015	TC Sports Club	18	(1)
2016	Green Gully	21	(0)
2017	Kauno Žalgiris	12	(1)
2017	Al Shabab Club		
- * Club domestic league appearances and goals as of September 30, 2016

Yohei Iwasaki (岩﨑 陽平, Iwasaki Yohei; born March 24, 1987) is a Japanese footballer. As of 2017, he plays for Al Shabab Club.

== Career ==
Born in Tsu, Mie, Iwasaki is known in Brazil for having played in Paraná clubs.

In 2013, he moved to India for joining the I-League side Rangdajied United.

In February 2016, Iwasaki moved to Australia, joining National Premier Leagues Victoria side Green Gully SC, led by Arthur Papas, who discovered the player during his time in India.

On 5 April 2017, he joined Lithuanian A Lyga club Kauno Žalgiris.

On 1 October, he joined Oman premier league club Al Shabab Club

== Club statistics ==
Club performance			League		Cup		League Cup		Total	
Season	Club	League	Apps	Goals	Apps	Goals	Apps	Goals	Apps	Goals
Brazil			League		Copa do Brasil		League Cup		Total	
2008	Camboriú									
2009	Paranavaí									
2009	Serrano									
2009	Pato Branco									
2010	Paraná Clube	Série B								
Japan			League		Emperor's Cup		League Cup		Total	
2010	Albirex Niigata	J1 League	0	0	0	0	0	0	0	0
2011	Albirex Niigata	J1 League	0	0	0	0	0	0	0	0
2012	FC Ganju Iwate	Regional Leagues	7	6	0	0	0	0	7	6
Paraguay			League		Copa Libertadores		Copa Sudamericana		Total	
2012	Independiente	Primera División								
India			League		Cup		Federation Cup		Total	
2013-2014	Rangdajied United	I-League	18	2					18	2
Japan			League		Emperor's Cup		League Cup		Total	
2014	FC Gifu	J2 League	2	0	0	0	-		2	0
Total	Brazil									
Total	Paraguay									
Total	India		18	2					18	2
Total	Japan		9	6	0	0	0	0	9	6
Career total			27	8	0	0	0	0	27	8
