= Wilsinho (footballer, born 1999) =

Brazilian footballer

Personal information
- Full name: Wilson de Paula Cavalheiro Filho
- Date of birth: 20 January 1999 (age 27)
- Place of birth: Curitiba, Brazil
- Position: Forward

Team information
- Current team: União Beltrão

Youth career
- –2019: Paraná

Senior career*
Years	Team	Apps	(Gls)
2019	Paraná	0	(0)
2019	→ Azuriz (loan)		
2020	União Beltrão	4	(0)
2020–2021	Guarani-SC	23	(2)
2021	Cascavel		
2021	Iguaçu	6	(0)
2022–	Rio Branco-PR	0	(0)
- * Club domestic league appearances and goals as of 16:14, 24 November 2021 (UTC)

Wilson de Paula Cavalheiro Filho (born 20 January 1999), commonly known as Wilsinho, is a Brazilian footballer who currently plays as a forward for Rio Branco-PR.

== Career statistics ==
=== Club ===
As of 24 November 2021.

Club	Season	League			State League		Cup		Other		Total	
Club	Season	Division	Apps	Goals	Apps	Goals	Apps	Goals	Apps	Goals	Apps	Goals
Paraná	2019	Série B	0	0	0	0	0	0	0	0	0	0
União Beltrão	2020	–			4 (Note: Appearances in the Campeonato Paranaense)	0	0	0	0	0	4	0
Guarani-SC	2020	–			9 (Note: Appearances in the Campeonato Catarinense Série B)	1	0	0	0	0	9	1
Guarani-SC	2021	–			14	1	0	0	0	0	14	1
Guarani-SC	Total		0	0	23	2	0	0	0	0	23	2
Iguaçu	2021	–			6 (Note: Appearances in the Campeonato Paranaense Segunda Divisão)	0	0	0	0	0	6	0
Career total			0	0	33	2	0	0	0	0	33	2
