= Danielzinho (footballer, born 1983) =

Brazilian footballer

Personal information
- Full name: Daniel Ferreira Pereira
- Date of birth: 12 April 1983 (age 43)
- Place of birth: Guarujá, Brazil
- Height: 1.66 m (5 ft 5 1/2 in)
- Position: Forward

Senior career*
Years	Team	Apps	(Gls)
2006	Democrata-SL		
2006	Guarujá		
2007	Oeste		
2008	Londrina		
2008	XV de Piracicaba		
2008	Arapongas		
2009	Iguaçu	0	(0)
2009	Paraná Clube	1	(0)
2009	Arapongas		
2010	Paranavaí		
2010–2011	Roma Apucarana	0	(0)
2011	Rio Verde		
- * Club domestic league appearances and goals

Daniel Ferreira Pereira (born 12 April 1983), commonly known as Danielzinho, is a Brazilian former footballer.

== Career statistics ==
=== Club ===
Club	Season	League			State League		Cup		Continental		Other		Total	
Club	Season	Division	Apps	Goals	Apps	Goals	Apps	Goals	Apps	Goals	Apps	Goals	Apps	Goals
Iguaçu	2009	–			? (Note: Appearances in the Campeonato Paranaense)	5	0	0	–		0	0	?	5
Paraná Clube	2009	Série B	1	0	0	0	0	0	–		0	0	1	0
Roma Apucarana	2011	–			19	3	0	0	–		0	0	19	3
Career total			1	0	19	8	0	0	0	0	0	0	20	8
