= Wilsinho =

Wilsinho is the Portuguese diminutive of the name Wilson. Wilsinho may refer to:

- Wilsinho (footballer, born 1950), full name Wilson de Oliveira Riça, Brazilian football left winger and manager
- Wilsinho (footballer, born 1956), full name Wilson Costa de Mendonça, Brazilian football right winger
- Wilsinho (footballer, born 1982), full name Wilson Antônio de Resende Júnior, Brazilian football forward
- Wilsinho (footballer, born 1999), full name Wilson de Paula Cavalheiro Filho, Brazilian football forward
- Wilson Fittipaldi Júnior (1943–2024), Brazilian racing driver
