= Danielzinho =

Danielzinho may refer to the following people:

- Danielzinho (footballer, born 1983), Brazilian footballer Daniel Ferreira Pereira
- Danielzinho (footballer, born 1988), Brazilian footballer Daniel Tiago Duarte
- Danielzinho (footballer, born 1994), Brazilian footballer Daniel de Oliveira Sertanejo
- Danielzinho (footballer, born 1996), Brazilian footballer Daniel Sampaio Simões
