= Estádio Waldemiro Wagner =

Football stadium in Brazil

Estádio Municipal Doutor Waldemiro Wagner
- Felipão
- Interactive map of Estádio Municipal Doutor Waldemiro Wagner
- Location: Paranavaí, Paraná, Brazil
- Coordinates: 23°04′26″S 52°28′5″W
- Owner: Paranavaí City Hall
- Capacity: 25,000
- Surface: Grass

Construction
- Opened: September 23, 1992

Tenant
- Atlético Clube Paranavaí

Estádio Municipal Waldemiro Wagner, also known as Felipão, is a football stadium located in Paranavaí, Brazil. The stadium has a maximum capacity of 25,000 people, and it is located in the Avenida Tancredo Neves, s/n, Paranavaí, Paraná. It was inaugurated in 1992, and it is owned by Paranavaí City Hall.

== History ==
Its construction was between 1991 and 1992, and the opening on September 23, 1992. With natural grass field (105 x 73 m), the public record was paying 23,725 (April 29, 2007) in the final of the Campeonato Paranaense 2007, between the Paraná Clube and Atlético Clube Paranavaí. The coverage of the Stadium Waldemiro Wagner was recovered in 2008. The roof had been destroyed at the end of 2005 during the storm that brought havoc to the city.
