= Galo Maringá =

Brazilian football club

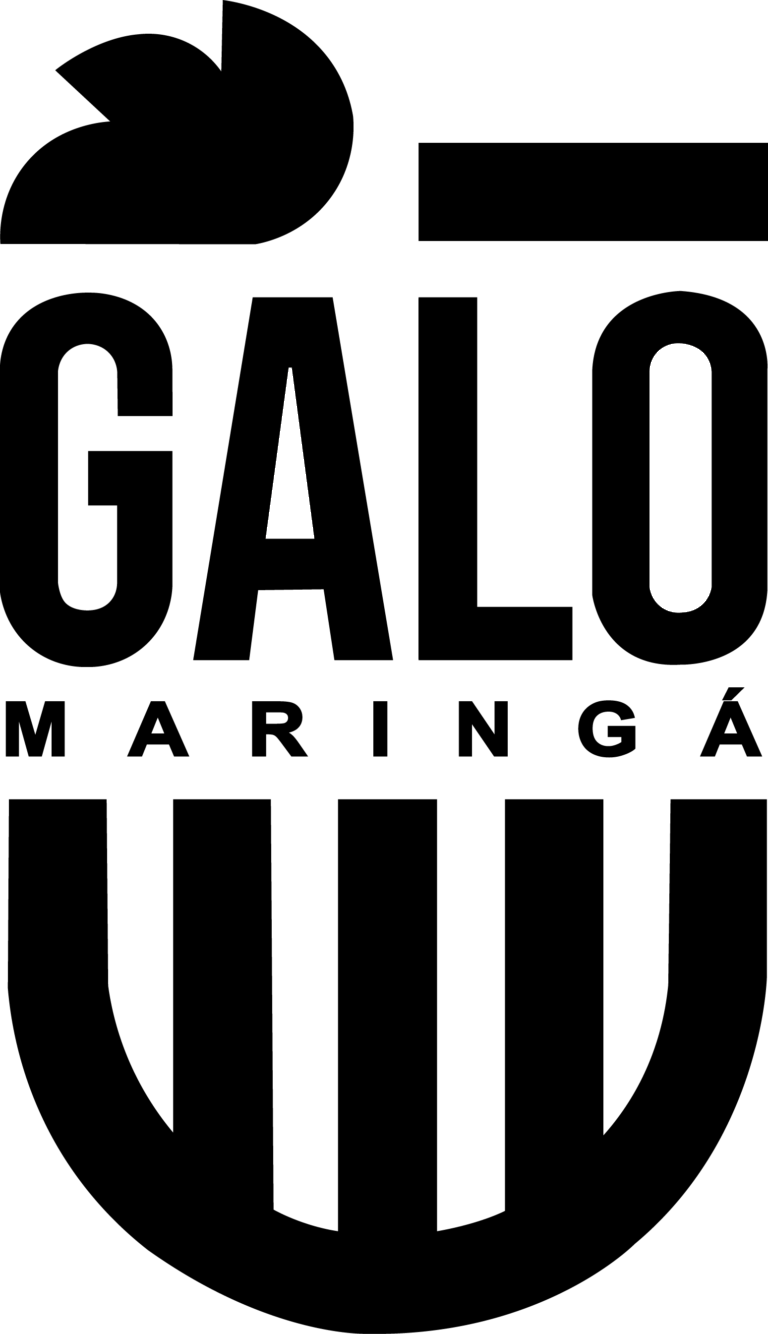
- Full name: Galo Maringá
- Nickname: Samurai rooster
- Founded: 18 December 2020; 5 years ago
- Ground: Estádio Willie Davids
- Capacity: 16,000
- President: João Batista Regini
- Head coach: Rafael Andrade
- League: Campeonato Paranaense
- 2025: Paranaense Série Prata, 1st of 10 (champions)
Home colours	Away colours

Galo Maringá, formerly known as Aruko Sports Brasil, is a Brazilian football club based in Maringá, Paraná. Founded in 2020, the club plays in the Campeonato Paranaense.

== History ==
Aruko's logo between 2020 and 2023

The club was founded on 18 December 2020, as a football branch of Aruko Group Japan and idealized by former footballer Alessandro Santos, a Maringá native who played for the Japan national football team. Aruko (which means "go hand in hand") played their first official match on 2 October 2021, a 2–0 Campeonato Paranaense Série Bronze win over Laranja Mecânica. The club ended the 2021 Série Bronze as champions, achieving promotion to the Campeonato Paranaense Série Prata.

In the 2022 Série Prata, Aruko reached the finals and achieved promotion to the 2023 Campeonato Paranaense, but lost the finals to Foz do Iguaçu.

Aruko finished the 2023 Paranaense in the seventh position, being eliminated in the quarterfinals of the competition. In September 2023, after owners Aruko Group Japan left the club, they changed name to Galo Maringá as an honour to the former club with the same name founded in 2005.

== Honours ==
- Campeonato Paranaense Série Prata
  - Winners (1): 2025
- Campeonato Paranaense Série Bronze
  - Winners (1): 2021
