= Campeonato Paranaense Third Division =

Football league in Paraná, Brazil

Campeonato Paranaense Série Bronze
- Organising body: FPF
- Founded: 1991; 35 years ago
- Country: Brazil
- State: (Paraná (state)) Paraná
- Level on pyramid: 3
- Promotion to: Second Division
- Current champions: Prudentópolis FC (2nd title) (2025)
- Most championships: Prudentópolis (3 titles)
- Website: FPF Official website

The Campeonato Paranaense Third Division (former Série Bronze) is the third tier of the professional state football league in the Brazilian state of Paraná. It is run by the Paraná Football Federation (FPF).

== List of champions ==
Season	Champions	Runners-up
1991	Ubiratã (1)	Caxias
1992–1996	Not held	
1997	Prudentópolis EC (1)	Caxias
1998	Nacional de Rolândia (1)	Cintos Mima
1999	Telêmaco Borba (1)	Ferroviário
2000	Nova Estrela (1)	Tamandaré
2001	Águia (1)	Arapongas
2002	Dois Vizinhos (1)	ADAP
2003	Sport Paraná (1)	Platinense
2004–2007	Not held	
2008	Serrano (1)	São José
2009	Pato Branco (1)	FC Cascavel
2010	Metropolitano (1)	Agex
2011	Junior Team (1)	Cincão
2012	Francisco Beltrão (1)	Colorado
2013	FC Cascavel (1)	São José
2014	Andraus (1)	Pato Branco
2015	Cascavel CR (1)	Cambé
2016	União (1)	Iraty
2017	Independente (1)	Rolândia
2018	Nacional de Rolândia (2)	Apucarana
2019	Andraus (2)	Arapongas
2020	AA Iguaçu (1)	Verê
2021	Aruko (1)	Foz do Iguaçu FC
2022	Grêmio Maringá (1)	Patriotas
2023	Paranavaí (1)	Nacional de Rolândia
2024	Batel (1)	Toledo
2025	Prudentópolis FC (2)	Verê

=== Notes ===
- Serrano is the currently Prudentópolis FC.
- Metropolitano is the currently Maringá FC.
- Aruko Sports is the currently Galo Maringá.

== Titles by team ==
Teams in bold still active.

Rank	Club	Winners	Winning years
2	**Andraus**	2	2014, 2019
2	**Nacional de Rolândia**	2	1998, 2018
2	**Prudentópolis FC**	2	2008, 2025
4	**AA Iguaçu**	1	2020
4	Águia	1	2001
4	**Aruko**	1	2021
4	**Batel**	1	2024
4	**Cascavel CR**	1	2015
4	Dois Vizinhos	1	2002
4	**FC Cascavel**	1	2013
4	**Francisco Beltrão**	1	2012
4	**Grêmio Maringá**	1	2022
4	**Independente**	1	2017
4	**Junior Team**	1	2012
4	**Maringá FC**	1	2010
4	Nova Estrela	1	2000
4	**Paranavaí**	1	2023
4	Pato Branco	1	2009
4	Prudentópolis EC	1	1997
4	Telêmaco Borba	1	1999
4	Sport Paraná	1	2003
4	Ubiratã	1	1991
4	**União Francisco Beltrão**	1	2016

=== By city ===
City	Championships	Clubs
Maringá	3	Grêmio Maringá (1), Maringá FC (1), Aruko (1)
Prudentópolis	3	Prudentópolis FC (2), Prudentópolis EC (1)
Campo Largo	2	Andraus (2)
Cascavel	2	Cascavel CR (1), FC Cascavel (1)
Francisco Beltrão	2	Francisco Beltrão (1), União Francisco Beltrão (1)
Rolândia	2	Nacional (2)
Dois Vizinhos	1	Dois Vizinhos (1)
Fazenda Rio Grande	1	Nova Estrela (1)
Formosa do Oeste	1	Sport Paraná (1)
Guarapuava	1	Batel (1)
Londrina	1	Junior Team (1)
Mandaguari	1	Águia (1)
Paranavaí	1	Paranavaí (1)
Pato Branco	1	Pato Branco (1)
São José dos Pinhais	1	Independente (1)
Telêmaco Borba	1	Telêmaco Borba (1)
Ubiratã	1	Ubiratã (1)
União da Vitória	1	AA Iguaçu (1)
