= 1994 Campeonato Brasileiro Série C =

Campeonato Brasileiro Série C
- Season: 1994
- Champions: Novorizontino
- Promoted: Novorizontino; Ferroviária
- Matches: 174
- Goals: 396 (2.28 per match)
- Biggest home win: Novorizontino 5-0 Atlético Sorocaba (October 2, 1994); Novorizontino 5-0 Ferroviária (December 9, 1994)
- Biggest away win: Sousa 0-4 CSA (October 23, 1994)
- Highest scoring: Matsubara 4-5 Novorizontino (October 9, 1995)

The Campeonato Brasileiro Série C 1994 was a football (soccer) series played from September 18 to December 9, 1994. It was the third level of the Brazilian National League. The competition had 42 clubs, and two of them were originally promoted to Série B.

== First phase ==
=== Group 1 ===
Pos	Team	Pld	W	D	L	GF	GA	GD	Pts	Qualification
1	(Rio Grande do Norte) ABC	4	2	0	2	6	4	+2	4	Qualified for the second phase
2	(Paraíba) Sousa	4	2	0	2	5	5	0	4	Qualified for the second phase
3	(Paraíba) América de Esperança	4	2	0	2	6	8	−2	4	Qualified for the second phase

Source: rsssfbrasil.com

=== Group 2 ===
Pos	Team	Pld	W	D	L	GF	GA	GD	Pts	Qualification
1	(Paraíba) Santa Cruz-PB	6	2	3	1	5	3	+2	7	Qualified for the second phase
2	(Paraíba) Botafogo-PB	6	1	5	0	7	6	+1	7	Qualified for the second phase
3	(Pernambuco) Vitória-PE	6	1	4	1	5	5	0	6	Qualified for the second phase
4	(Pernambuco) Porto	6	0	4	2	5	8	−3	4	

Source: rsssfbrasil.com

=== Group 3 ===
Pos	Team	Pld	W	D	L	GF	GA	GD	Pts	Qualification
1	(Sergipe) Itabaiana	6	4	1	1	8	4	+4	9	Qualified for the second phase
2	(Alagoas) CSA	6	3	0	3	8	6	+2	6	Qualified for the second phase
3	(Sergipe) Maruinense	6	2	1	3	6	9	−3	5	Qualified for the second phase
4	(Sergipe) Confiança	6	1	2	3	6	9	−3	4	

Source: rsssfbrasil.com

=== Group 4 ===
Pos	Team	Pld	W	D	L	GF	GA	GD	Pts	Qualification
1	(Espírito Santo) Vitória-ES	2	1	1	0	1	0	+1	3	Qualified for the second phase
2	(Bahia) Catuense	2	0	1	1	0	1	−1	1	Qualified for the second phase
–	(Bahia) Serrano (W)	0	–	–	–	–	–	—	0	

Source: rsssfbrasil.com
(W) Withdrew

=== Group 5 ===
Pos	Team	Pld	W	D	L	GF	GA	GD	Pts	Qualification
1	(Minas Gerais) Valeriodoce	6	2	4	0	6	3	+3	8	Qualified for the second phase
2	(Minas Gerais) Villa Nova	6	1	4	1	4	4	0	6	Qualified for the second phase
3	(Rio de Janeiro (state)) Campo Grande	6	1	3	2	5	6	−1	5	Qualified for the second phase
4	(Minas Gerais) Tupi	6	1	3	2	3	5	−2	5	

Source: rsssfbrasil.com

=== Group 6 ===
Pos	Team	Pld	W	D	L	GF	GA	GD	Pts	Qualification
1	(São Paulo (state)) Juventus	6	4	1	1	7	6	+1	9	Qualified for the second phase
2	(São Paulo (state)) Ituano	6	3	1	2	7	4	+3	7	Qualified for the second phase
3	(Rio de Janeiro (state)) América-RJ	6	3	0	3	6	5	+1	6	Qualified for the second phase
4	(São Paulo (state)) Santo André	6	0	2	4	3	8	−5	2	

Source: rsssfbrasil.com

=== Group 7 ===
Pos	Team	Pld	W	D	L	GF	GA	GD	Pts	Qualification
1	(Goiás) Vila Nova	6	4	0	2	8	5	+3	8	Qualified for the second phase
2	(Federal District (Brazil)) Taguatinga	6	3	1	2	6	5	+1	7	Qualified for the second phase
3	(Goiás) Atlético-GO	6	2	1	3	5	5	0	5	Qualified for the second phase
4	(Tocantins) União Araguainense	6	2	0	4	6	10	−4	4	

Source: rsssfbrasil.com

=== Group 8 ===
Pos	Team	Pld	W	D	L	GF	GA	GD	Pts	Qualification
1	(Minas Gerais) Uberlândia	6	5	1	0	9	4	+5	11	Qualified for the second phase
2	(Goiás) Caldas	6	2	2	2	8	7	+1	6	Qualified for the second phase
3	(Goiás) Itumbiara	6	2	0	4	9	11	−2	4	Qualified for the second phase
4	(Mato Grosso) Operário-MT	6	1	1	4	3	7	−4	3	

Source: rsssfbrasil.com

=== Group 9 ===
Pos	Team	Pld	W	D	L	GF	GA	GD	Pts	Qualification
1	(São Paulo (state)) Novorizontino	6	5	1	0	16	7	+9	11	Qualified for the second phase
2	(Paraná (state)) Matsubara	6	4	0	2	14	8	+6	8	Qualified for the second phase
3	(Minas Gerais) Esportivo de Passos	6	2	0	4	6	9	−3	4	Qualified for the second phase
4	(São Paulo (state)) Atlético Sorocaba	6	0	1	5	0	12	−12	1	

Source: rsssfbrasil.com

=== Group 10 ===
Pos	Team	Pld	W	D	L	GF	GA	GD	Pts	Qualification
1	(Paraná (state)) União Bandeirante	6	3	1	2	8	4	+4	7	Qualified for the second phase
2	(Mato Grosso do Sul) Operário-MS	6	2	2	2	6	7	−1	6	Qualified for the second phase
3	(São Paulo (state)) Ferroviária	6	2	2	2	4	5	−1	6	Qualified for the second phase
4	(São Paulo (state)) Rio Branco-SP	6	2	1	3	6	8	−2	5	

Source: rsssfbrasil.com

=== Group 11 ===
Pos	Team	Pld	W	D	L	GF	GA	GD	Pts	Qualification
1	(Santa Catarina (state)) Joinville	6	3	3	0	8	2	+6	9	Qualified for the second phase
2	(Santa Catarina (state)) Figueirense	6	3	1	2	8	8	0	7	Qualified for the second phase
3	(Paraná (state)) Batel	6	2	2	2	4	5	−1	6	Qualified for the second phase
4	(Santa Catarina (state)) Blumenau	6	0	2	4	3	8	−5	2	

Source: rsssfbrasil.com

== Second phase ==
Team 1	Agg.	Team 2	1st leg	2nd leg
Juventus	3-3(a)	Valeriodoce	2-2	1-1
Figueirense	0-2	Juventus	0-1	0-1
Caldas	0-3	Vila Nova	0-3	0-0
Ferroviária	3-0	Matsubara	3-0	0-0
ABC	6-5	Botafogo-PB	4-1	2-4
Vitória-PE	3-2	América de Esperança	0-2	3-0
Sousa	1-7	CSA	0-4	1-3
Catuense	5-0	Itabaiana	4-0	1-0
Itumbiara	2-2	Taguatinga	2-2	0-1
União Bandeirante	2-3	Novorizontino	0-0	2-3
Esportivo de Passsos	3-1	Campo Grande	2-0	1-1
Ituano	3-1	Joinville	1-0	2-1
Maruinense	4-3	Santa Cruz-PB	4-2	0-1
Villa Nova	2-2(a)	Vitória-ES	2-1	0-1
Atlético-GO	0-1	Uberlândia	0-0	0-1
Batel	0-1	Operário-MS	0-0	0-1

== Round of 16 ==
Team 1	Agg.	Team 2	1st leg	2nd leg
Valeriodoce	4-3	Juventus	3-1	1-2
Ferroviária	2-0	Vila Nova	2-0	0-0
Vitória-PE	2-6	ABC	2-3	0-3
Catuense	6-2	CSA	3-0	3-2
Taguatinga	2-4	Novorizontino	1-3	1-1
Esportivo de Passsos	0-0(p)	Ituano	0-0	0-0
Maruinense	0-0(p)	Vitória-ES	0-0	0-0
Operário-MS	1-3	Uberlândia	0-0	1-3

== Quarterfinals ==
Team 1	Agg.	Team 2	1st leg	2nd leg
Valeriodoce	3-4	Ferroviária	2-2	1-3
ABC	4-5	Catuense	4-2	0-3
Ituano	1-3	Novorizontino	1-0	0-3
Maruinense	2-5	Uberlândia	2-2	0-3

== Semifinals ==
Team 1	Agg.	Team 2	1st leg	2nd leg
Catuense	1-2	Ferroviária	1-0	0-2
Novorizontino	3-1	Uberlândia	2-0	1-1

== Final ==
December 4, 1994

Ferroviária	0–1	Novorizontino

December 9, 1994

Novorizontino	5–0	Ferroviária

Novorizontino declared as the Campeonato Brasileiro Série C champions by aggregate score of 6-0.

== Sources ==
- "Brazil Third Level 1994". rsssfbrasil.com. Archived from the original on 2020-01-04.
