= FC Cascavel =

Association football club based in Cascavel, Brazil

- Full name: Futebol Clube Cascavel
- Nickname: Auri Negro
- Founded: 16 January 2008 (18 years ago)
- Ground: Estádio Olímpico Regional Arnaldo Busatto
- Capacity: 28,125
- President: Valdinei António Da Silva
- League: Campeonato Brasileiro Série D Campeonato Paranaense
- 2025 2025: Série D, 30th of 64; Paranaense, 9th of 12
- Website: fccascavel.com.br
| Home colours | Away colours | Third colours |

Futebol Clube Cascavel, more commonly referred to as FC Cascavel, is a Brazilian professional association football club based in Cascavel, Paraná, that competes in the Série D, the fourth tier of Brazilian football, as well as in the Campeonato Paranaense, the top division of the Paraná state football league.

== History ==
The club was founded on 16 January 2008. by the footballer Juliano Haus Belletti. They finished in the second position in the Campeonato Paranaense Third Level in 2009, losing the competition to Pato Branco.

== Honours ==
=== State ===
- Campeonato Paranaense
  - Runners-up (2): 2021, 2023
- Copa Paraná
  - Runners-up (1): 2017
- Campeonato Paranaense Second Division
  - Winners (1): 2014
- Campeonato Paranaense Third Division
  - Runners-up (1): 2009
- Campeonato Paranaense do Interior
  - Winners (3): 2020, 2021, 2023

== Stadium ==
FC Cascavel play their home games at Estádio Olímpico Regional Arnaldo Busatto. The stadium has a maximum capacity of 28,125 people.
