= Campeonato Paranaense Second Division =

Football league in Paraná, Brazil

Campeonato Paranaense Série Prata
- Organising body: FPF
- Founded: 1915; 111 years ago
- Country: Brazil
- State: (Paraná (state)) Paraná
- Level on pyramid: 2
- Promotion to: Campeonato Paranaense
- Relegation to: Campeonato Paranaense Third Division
- Current champions: Paranavaí (4th title) (2026)
- Most championships: Paranavaí (4 titles)
- Website: FPF Official website

The Campeonato Paranaense Second Division (former Série Prata) is the second tier of the professional state football league in the Brazilian state of Paraná. It is run by the Paraná Football Federation (FPF).

== List of champions ==
Season	Champions	Runners-up
1915 (A)	Savóia (1)	Reco-Reco
1915 (B)	Britânia (1)	Torino
1916	Operário (1)	Água Verde FC
1917	Água Verde FC (1)	Guarani
1918–1920	Not held	
1921	Campo Alegre (1)	
1922	Paranaense FC (1)	Batel
1923	Not held	
1924	Paranaense FC (2)	
1925–1929	Not held	
1930	Guarany (1)	Ferroviário
1931–1965	Not held	
1966	Jandaia (1)	Operário
1967	Paranavaí (1)	Pindorama
1968 (North)	CAFE (1)	União Platinense
1968 (South)	Oeste (1)	Tuiuti
1969 (North)	Jandaia (2)	União Platinense
1969 (South)	Operário (2)	Caramuru
1970 (North)	União Platinense (1)	Nacional de Rolândia
1970 (South)	Cascavel FC (1)	Rio Branco
1971–1974	Not held	
1975	9 de Julho (1)	Arapongas
1976	Centenário (1)	Matsubara
1977	Apucarana (1)	Pato Branco
1978	Guarapuava (1)	Agroceres
1979	União Francisco Beltrão (1)	Cascavel EC
1980	Not held	
1981	Pato Branco (1)	União Francisco Beltrão
1982	Pinheiros (2)	União Francisco Beltrão
1983	Paranavaí (2)	AA Iguaçu
1984	Apucarana (2)	Operário
1985	Platinense (1)	Operário
1986	Pato Branco (2)	Umuarama
1987	AA Iguaçu (1)	Umuarama
1988	União Bandeirante (1)	Foz do Iguaçu EC
1989	Maringá AC (1)	Arapongas
1990	Goioerê (1)	União Operário
1991	AA Iguaçu (2)	Pato Branco
1992; Divisão Intermediária	União Bandeirante (2)	Batel
1992; Segunda Divisão	Paranavaí (3)	Real Beltronense
1993	Iraty (1)	Coronel Vivida
1994	Jandaia (3)	Ponta Grossa
1995	Maringá FC (1)	União da Vitória
1996	AA Iguaçu (3)	Platinense
1997	Not held	
1998	Malutron (1)	Batel
1999	Londrina (1)	Portuguesa
2000	Francisco Beltrão (1)	Iraty
2001	Grêmio Maringá (1)	Portuguesa
2002	Francisco Beltrão (2)	Paranavaí
2003	Nacional de Rolândia (1)	Cianorte
2004	Engenheiro Beltrão (1)	Império Toledo
2005	Galo Maringá (1)	Toledo
2006	Portuguesa (1)	Cascavel CR
2007	Toledo (1)	Real Brasil
2008	Nacional de Rolândia (2)	Foz do Iguaçu FC
2009	Serrano (1)	Operário
2010	Roma (1)	Arapongas
2011	Londrina (2)	Toledo
2012	Paraná (1)	Nacional de Rolândia
2013	Metropolitano (1)	Prudentópolis
2014	FC Cascavel (1)	Nacional de Rolândia
2015	PSTC (1)	Toledo
2016	Cianorte (1)	Prudentópolis
2017	Maringá FC (2)	União Francisco Beltrão
2018	Operário (3)	Cascavel CR
2019	PSTC (2)	União Francisco Beltrão
2020	Azuriz (1)	Maringá FC
2021	Independente (1)	União Francisco Beltrão
2022	Foz do Iguaçu FC (1)	Aruko
2023	Andraus (1)	PSTC
2024	Paraná (2)	Rio Branco
2025	Galo Maringá (1)	Foz do Iguaçu FC
2026	Paranavaí (4)	Paraná

=== Notes ===
- In 1971 Britânia, Ferroviário and Palestra Itália merged into the Colorado Esporte Clube.
- In 1989 Colorado and Pinheiros merged into the Paraná Clube.
- Maringá FC, winners of 1995 edition and Maringá FC, winners of 2017 edition are two different clubs.
- Galo Maringá, winners of 2005 edition and Galo Maringá, winners of 2025 edition are two different clubs.

Names change

- Malutron (Malucelli/Trombini) changed its name to J. Malucelli after the end of the partnership.
- Savoia changed its name to EC Água Verde and later to EC Pinheiros.
- Serrano is the currently Prudentópolis.
- Metropolitano is the currently Maringá FC.
- Aruko Sports is the currently Galo Maringá.

== Titles by team ==
Teams in bold still active.

Rank	Club	Winners	Winning years
1	**Paranavaí**	4	1967, 1983, 1992, 2026
2	**AA Iguaçu**	3	1987, 1991, 1996
2	**Operário Ferroviário**	3	1916, 1969 (S), 2018
2	Jandaia	3	1966, 1969 (N), 1994
5	Apucarana	2	1977, 1984
5	Francisco Beltrão	2	2000, 2002
5	**Londrina**	2	1999, 2011
5	**Maringá FC**	2	2013, 2017
5	**Nacional de Rolândia**	2	2003, 2008
5	**Paraná**	2	2012, 2024
5	Paranaense FC	2	1922, 1924
5	Pato Branco	2	1981, 1986
5	Pinheiros	2	1915 (A), 1982
5	**PSTC**	2	2015, 2019
5	União Bandeirante	2	1987, 1992
16	9 de Julho	1	1975
16	Água Verde FC	1	1917
16	**Andraus**	1	2023
16	**Azuriz**	1	2020
16	Britânia	1	1915 (B)
16	CAFE	1	1968 (N)
16	Campo Alegre	1	1921
16	Cascavel FC	1	1970 (S)
16	Centenário	1	1976
16	**Cianorte**	1	2016
16	Engenheiro Beltrão	1	2004
16	**FC Cascavel**	1	2014
16	**Foz do Iguaçu FC**	1	2022
16	Galo Maringá	1	2005
16	**Galo Maringá** (former Aruko Sports)	1	2025
16	Grêmio Goioerê	1	1990
16	**Grêmio Maringá**	1	2001
16	Guarany	1	1930
16	Guarapuava	1	1978
16	**Independente**	1	2021
16	**Iraty**	1	1993
16	J. Malucelli	1	1998
16	Maringá AC	1	1989
16	Maringá FC (1995)	1	1995
16	Grêmio Oeste	1	1968 (S)
16	Platinense	1	1985
16	**Portuguesa**	1	2006
16	**Prudentópolis**	1	2009
16	Roma	1	2010
16	**Toledo**	1	2007
16	**União**	1	1979
16	União Platinense	1	1970 (N)

=== By city ===
City	Championships	Clubs
Curitiba	9	Paranaense FC (2), Paraná (2), Pinheiros (2), Água Verde FC (1), Britânia (1), Guarany (1)
Maringá	7	Maringá FC (2), Galo Maringá (1), Galo Maringá (Aruko) (1), Grêmio Maringá (1), Maringá AC (1), Maringá FC (1995) (1)
Paranavaí	4	Paranavaí (4)
Apucarana	3	Apucarana (2), Roma (1)
Cornélio Procópio	3	PSTC (2), 9 de Julho (1)
Francisco Beltrão	3	Francisco Beltrão (2), União (1)
Jandaia do Sul	3	Jandaia (3)
Londrina	3	Londrina (2), Portuguesa (1)
Pato Branco	3	Pato Branco (2), Azuriz (1)
Ponta Grossa	3	Operário Ferroviário (3)
União da Vitória	3	AA Iguaçu (3)
Bandeirantes	2	União Bandeirante (2)
Cascavel	2	Cascavel FC (1), FC Cascavel (1)
Cianorte	2	CAFE (1), Cianorte (1)
Guarapuava	2	Guarapuava (1), Grêmio Oeste (1)
Rolândia	2	Nacional (2)
Santo Antônio da Platina	2	Platinense (1), União Platinense (1)
São José dos Pinhais	2	Independente (1), J. Malucelli (1)
Campo Largo	1	Andraus (1)
Centenário do Sul	1	Centenário (1)
Engenheiro Beltrão	1	Engenheiro Beltrão (1)
Foz do Iguaçu	1	Foz do Iguaçu FC (1)
Goioerê	1	Grêmio Goioerê (1)
Irati	1	Iraty (1)
Prudentópolis	1	Prudentópolis (1)
Toledo	1	Toledo (1)
