= Associação Portuguesa Londrinense =

Brazilian football club

Portuguesa Londrinense
- Full name: Associação Portuguesa Londrinense
- Nickname: Lusinha
- Founded: 14 May 1950
- Ground: Estádio do Café
- Capacity: 45,000
- League: Campeonato Paranaense Série Bronze
- 2025: Paranaense Série Bronze, 11th of 13
Home colours	Away colours

Portuguesa Londrinense, usually known simply as Portuguesa Londrinense, is a Brazilian football team from the city of Londrina, Paraná state, founded on May 14, 1950.

== History ==
On May 14, 1950, the club was founded as Associação Atlética Portuguesa de Desportos.

In 1997, the club was renamed to its current name, Associação Portuguesa Londrinense, after returning to compete in professional competitions.

== Honours ==
- Campeonato Paranaense Série Prata
  - Runners-up (2): 1999, 2001
