= Estádio Municipal 14 de Dezembro =

Stadium in Toledo, Brazil

Coordinates: 24°43′26″S 53°45′16″W

- Interactive map of Estádio Municipal 14 de Dezembro
- Full name: Estádio Municipal 14 de Dezembro
- Location: Toledo, Paraná, Brazil
- Capacity: 15,280
- Surface: Grass

Construction
- Opened: 1967

Tenant
- Toledo Colônia Work

The Estádio Municipal 14 de Dezembro is a stadium in Toledo, Brazil. It has a capacity of 15,280 spectators. It is the home of Toledo Colônia Work. The stadium is known as "The Cathedral of Football" by the home supporters.
