= Nacional Atlético Clube Sociedade Civil Ltda. =

Nacional
- Full name: Nacional Atlético Clube S/C Ltda.
- Nicknames: Alvi-Celeste; NAC; Gurreiro do Norte
- Founded: April 28, 1947; 79 years ago
- Ground: Estádio Erich George
- Capacity: 1,600
- League: Campeonato Paranaense Série Prata
- 2025: Paranaense Série Prata, 4th of 10
Home colors	Away colors

Nacional Atlético Clube, more commonly referred to as Nacional de Rolândia, is a Brazilian professional association football club in Rolândia, Paraná which currently plays in Série D, the fourth tier of Brazilian football, as well as in the Campeonato Paranaense Segunda Divisão, the second division of the Paraná state football league.

Founded on April 28, 1947, in 2004 the club competed in the Brazilian Championship Third Division.

== History ==
In 1998, Nacional won the Campeonato Paranaense Third Division, and in 2003 the club won the Campeonato Paranaense Second Division, finishing ahead of CIanorte, ADAP, Marechal, Dois Vizinhos and Foz do Iguaçu in the final stage.

In 2004, the club competed in the Brazilian Championship Third Division, but was eliminated in the first stage.

== Honours ==
- Copa Paraná
  - Winners (1): 2019
- Campeonato Paranaense Série Prata
  - Winners (1): 2003, 2008
  - Runners-up (3): 1970, 2012, 2014
- Campeonato Paranaense Série Bronze
  - Winners (2): 1998, 2018
