= Patriotas Futebol Clube =

Patriotas
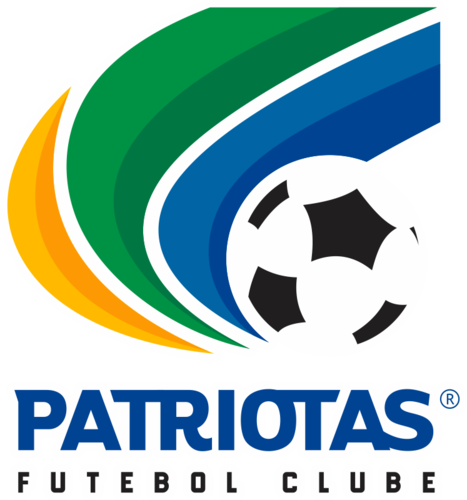
- Full name: Patriotas Futebol Clube
- Founded: 22 July 2020; 5 years ago
- Ground: Estádio Durival Britto
- Capacity: 20,000
- President: Olaídes Ferreira
- League: Campeonato Paranaense Série Prata
- 2025: Paranaense Série Prata, 5th of 10
Home colors	Away colors

Patriotas Futebol Clube, simply known as Patriotas, is a Brazilian football club based in Ganchinho, district of Curitiba, Paraná.

== History ==
The club was established in 2020, and disputed their first season in 2021, being promoted to the Campeonato Paranaense Série Prata in 2022.

== Honours ==
- Campeonato Paranaense Série Bronze
  - Runners-up: 2022

== Appearances ==
Following is the summary of Patriotas appearances in Campeonato Paranaense.

Season	Division	Final position
2021	3rd	7th
2022	3rd	2nd
2023	2nd	3rd
2024	2nd	3rd
2025	2nd	5th
