= Associação Atlética Batel =

Association football club in Brazil

Batel
- Full name: Associação Atlética Batel
- Founded: March 17, 1951; 75 years ago
- Ground: Estádio Waldomiro Gelinski
- Capacity: 7,000
- President: Alfredo Gelinski
- Head coach: Dudu Sales
| Home colours | Away colours |

Associação Atlética Batel, is a Brazilian football team based in Guarapuava, Paraná state. They competed in the Série C twice.

== History ==
The club was founded on March 17, 1951, in Batel neighborhood, Guarapuava. They competed in the Série C in 1994 and in 1995, being eliminated in the Second Stage in both editions of the competition.

Much of the local community is of Ukrainian descent and in 2023 the club adopted the name, colours and crest of the former FC Mariupol, whose facilities and ground were destroyed during the Russian invasion of Ukraine. But the change ended up never being completed.

== Honours ==
- Campeonato Paranaense Série Prata
  - Runners-up (1): 1992
- Campeonato Paranaense Série Bronze
  - Winners (1): 2024

== Stadium ==
Batel play their home games at Estádio Waldomiro Gelinski, nicknamed Estádio Lobo Solitário. The stadium has a maximum capacity of 7,000 people.
