= Prudentópolis Esporte Clube =

Prudentópolis
- Full name: Prudentópolis Esporte Clube
- Founded: May 25, 1968 (57 years ago)
- Ground: Estádio Newton Agibert, Prudentópolis, Paraná state, Brazil
- Capacity: 3,500
Home colors	Away colors

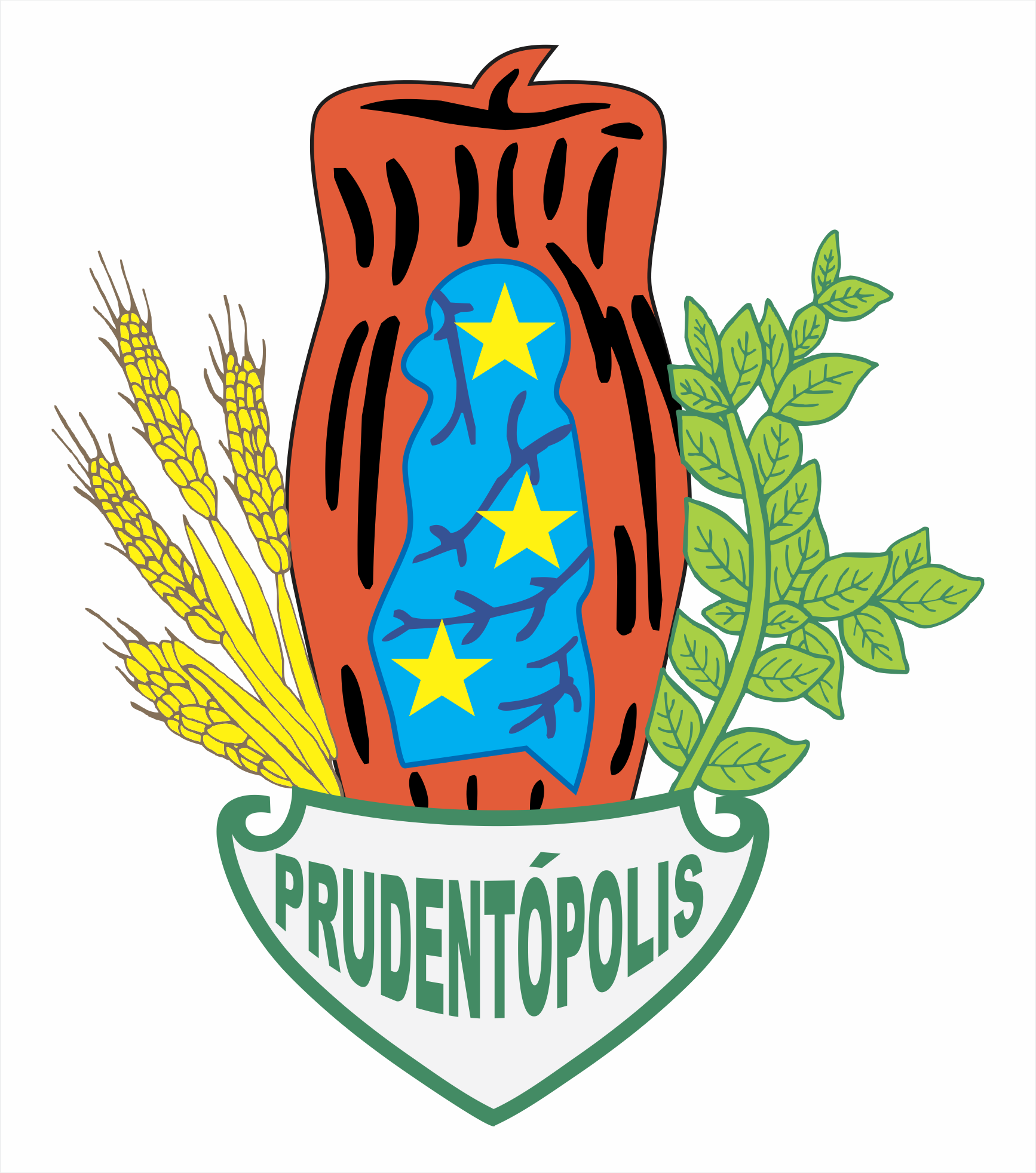
Team crest

Prudentópolis Esporte Clube, commonly known as Prudentópolis, is a Brazilian football club based in Prudentópolis, Paraná state. They competed in the Copa do Brasil once.

== History ==
The club was founded on May 25, 1968. Prudentópolis won the Campeonato Paranaense Third Level in 1997 and competed in the Copa do Brasil in 2004, when they were eliminated in the second stage by Internacional.

== Achievements ==
- Campeonato Paranaense Third Level:
  - Winners (1): 1997

== Stadium ==
Prudentópolis Esporte Clube play their home games at Estádio Newton Agibert. The stadium has a maximum capacity of 3,500 people.
