= União Bandeirante F.C. =

União Bandeirante
- Full name: União Bandeirante Futebol Clube
- Founded: 15 November 1964
- Dissolved: 4 August 2006
- Ground: Comendador Luís Serafim Meneghel
- Capacity: 8,000
Home colours	Away colours

União Bandeirante Futebol Clube, usually known as União Bandeirante, was a football team from the city of Bandeirantes, in the state of Paraná, Brazil.

== History ==
On 15 November 1964, União Bandeirante Futebol Clube was founded as Usina Bandeirante Futebol Clube. Then the club and another club form the same city, Guarani, fused, and the new club was named União Bandeirante Futebol Clube.

In 2006, the club was deactivated by its owners, who are the sons of Serafim Meneghel, who was the club's patron.

== Honours ==
- Campeonato Paranaense
  - Runners-up (4): 1966, 1971, 1989, 1992
- Campeonato Paranaense Série Prata
  - Winners (2): 1987, 1992

== Stadium ==
União Bandeirante Futebol Clube's home matches are usually played at Comendador Luís Serafim Meneghel stadium (also known as Estádio Vila Maria), which has a maximum capacity of 8,000 people.

== Mascots ==
There are three club mascots: the Caçula Milionário (Millionnaire Youngster), the Bêbado (Drunken Man) and the Caipira. The first mascot, the Caçula Milionário, was created in the 1960s.

== Club colors ==
The club colors are black and white
