= Cascavel Clube Recreativo =

Brazilian professional football club

Cascavel CR
- Full name: Cascavel Clube Recreativo
- Nicknames: Serpente (Snake); Tricolor do Oeste (West Tricolor); CCR
- Founded: December 17, 2001; 24 years ago
- Ground: Estádio Olímpico Regional Arnaldo Busatto
- Capacity: 28,125
- President: Tony Di Almeida
- League: Campeonato Paranaense
- 2020: Paranaense, 9th
Home colours	Away colours

Cascavel Clube Recreativo, more commonly referred to as Cascavel CR, is a Brazilian professional association football club in Cascavel, Paraná which currently plays in Campeonato Paranaense, the top division of the Paraná state football league.

== History ==
The club was founded on December 17, 2001, after Cascavel Esporte Clube, SOREC and Cascavel S/A merged.

== Stadium ==
Cascavel Clube Recreativo play their home games at Estádio Olímpico Regional Arnaldo Busatto. The stadium has a maximum capacity of 45,000 people.

== Honours ==
- Campeonato Paranaense Série Prata
  - Runners-up (2): 2006, 2018
- Campeonato Paranaense Série Bronze
  - Winners (1): 2015
