= Estádio Willie Davids =

Coordinates: 23°24′51″S 51°56′17″W

- Estádio Willie Davids
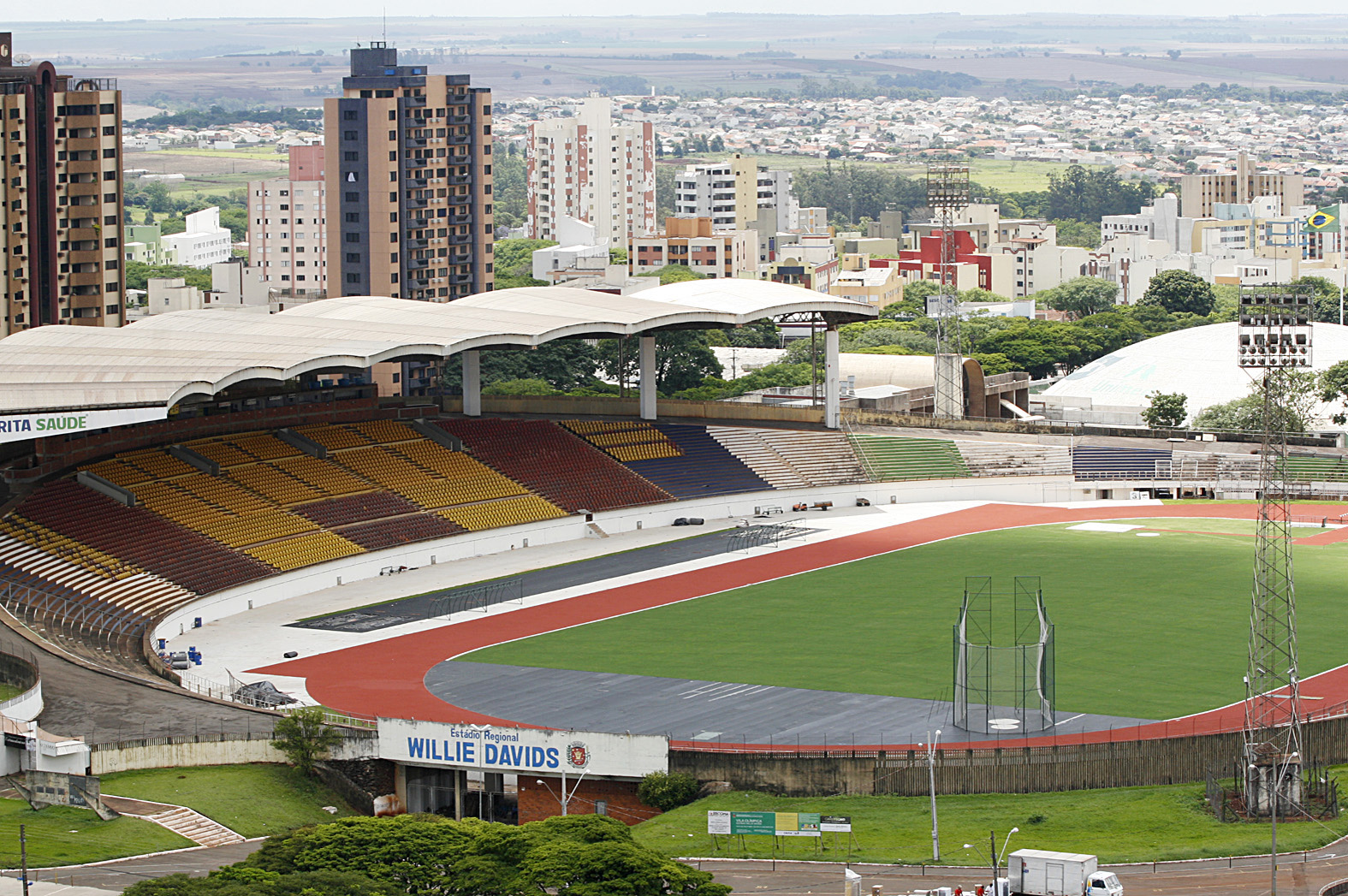
- Sisbrace
- Interactive map of Estádio Willie Davids
- Full name: Estádio Regional Willie Davids
- Location: Maringá, Paraná, Brazil
- Owner: Municipality of Maringá
- Operator: Municipality of Maringá
- Capacity: 16,226
- Surface: Grass

Construction
- Built: 1953
- Opened: May 12, 1957
- Renovated: October 12, 1976

Tenants
- Grêmio Maringá, Maringá FC and Galo Maringá

The Estádio Regional Willie Davids is a stadium in Maringá, Brazil. It has a capacity of 14,995 people. It is the home of Grêmio Maringá, Maringá FC and Galo Maringá.
