= Associação Atlética Iguaçu =

Brazilian football club

Iguaçu
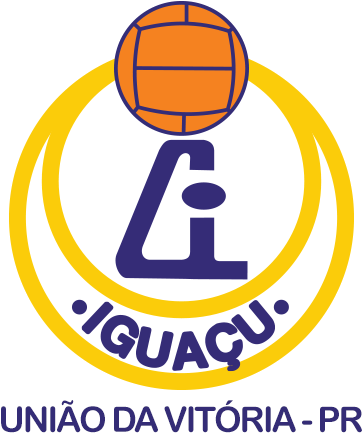
- Full name: Associação Atlética Iguaçu
- Nickname: Pantera do Vale
- Founded: August 15, 1971
- Ground: Estádio Municipal Antiocho Pereira
- Capacity: 12,000
Home colors	Away colors

Associação Atlética Iguaçu, usually known simply as Iguaçu, is a Brazilian football team from the city of União da Vitória, Paraná state, founded on August 15, 1971. The club won the Campeonato Paranaense Second Division twice, in 1987 and in 1991.

== Honours ==
State
Competitions	Titles	Seasons
Campeonato Paranaense Série Prata	3^{s}	1987, 1991, 2016
Campeonato Paranaense Série Bronze	1	2020

- record
- ^{s} shared record

=== Runners-Up ===
- Campeonato Paranaense Série Prata (1): 1983
