= Associação Desportiva Atlética do Paraná =

ADAP
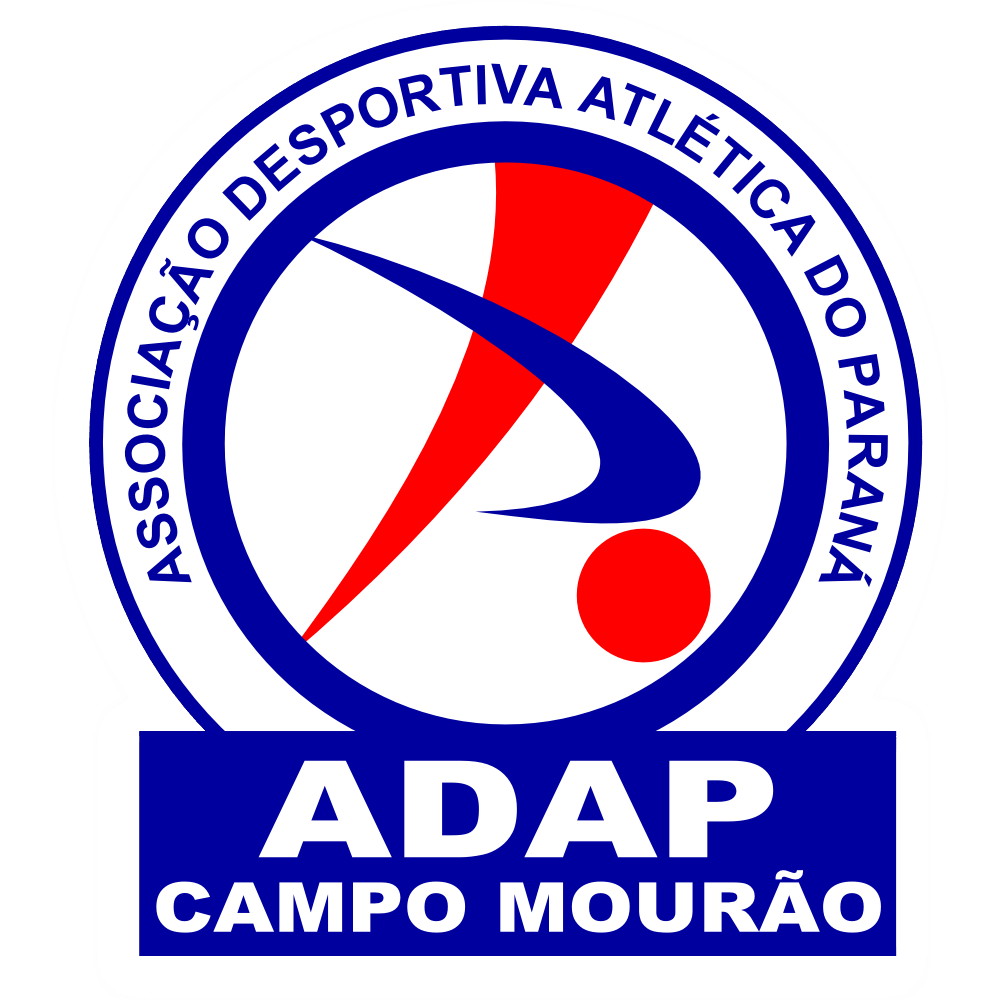
- Full name: Associação Desportiva Atlética do Paraná
- Founded: 1999
- Dissolved: 2006
- Ground: Roberto Brzezinski
- Capacity: 3,000
- League: –
- 2006: Campeonato Brasileiro Série C, eliminated in first stage
Home colours	Away colours

Associação Desportiva Atlética do Paraná, usually known as ADAP (or Adap) was a Brazilian football club, from Campo Mourão, Paraná state.

== History ==
On June 5, 1999, the club was founded by the Adilson and Avanilton Batista Prado brothers. The club was originally from Jacarezinho.

In January, 2002, ADAP moved to Campo Mourão city, after the initiative of the city's mayor, Tauilio Tezelli. In that year, the club was Campeonato Paranaense Série A-2 (Campeonato Paranaense Third Division) runner-up. ADAP was defeated by Dois Vizinhos in the final.

In 2003, due to Ponta Grossa's bad financial condition, their berth in the Campeonato Paranaense was sold to ADAP. ADAP disputed the competition representing Ponta Grossa, and finished in the 13th position in the competition. ADAP was christened Adap-Ponta Grossa in the competition. The club has also finished in the 3rd position in the Série A-2 (the Second Division).

In 2004, again ADAP replaced Ponta Grossa in the Campeonato Paranaense, and the club was eliminated in the second stage. However, ADAP was not representing Ponta Grossa at this time.

In 2005, ADAP was again eliminated in the Campeonato Paranaense second stage, which was the quarterfinals. The club was eliminated by Iraty in a penalty shootout.

In 2006, the club finished as Campeonato Paranaense runner-up. The club was defeated by Paraná in the final.

In November, 2006, the club and Galo Maringá Futebol Clube fused. The new club was named Adap Galo Maringá Futebol Clube.

== Honours ==
- Campeonato Paranaense
  - Runner-up (1): 2006
- Campeonato Paranaense Série Bronze
  - Runners-up (1): 2002

== Stadium ==
The club's home matches are usually played at Roberto Brzezinski stadium, which has a maximum capacity of 3,000 people.

== Idols ==
- Souza

== Colors ==
The club's colors are blue and red.
