= Pato Branco Esporte Clube =

Pato Branco
- Full name: Pato Branco Esporte Clube
- Nickname(s): Tricolor do Sudoeste
- Founded: November 5, 1979
- Ground: Estádio Os Pioneiros, Pato Branco, Paraná state, Brazil
- Capacity: 1,500
Home colours	Away colours

Pato Branco Esporte Clube, commonly known as Pato Branco, is a Brazilian football club based in Pato Branco, Paraná state.

== History ==
The club was founded on November 5, 1979 after a fusion inbetween Internacional Esporte Clube (Pato Branco) and Sociedade Esportiva Palmeiras (Pato Branco) . They won the Campeonato Paranaense Second Level in 1981 and in 1986, and the Campeonato Paranaense Third Level in 2007. In 2009, the club conquered the Third Level again, but after a relegation in the 2010 Second Level, it was only going to play again in the 2012 season, but the club didn't have good performance. In 2014, was the runners-up on the Third Level and in 2017 it dissolved.

== Honours ==
- Campeonato Paranaense Série Prata
  - Winners (2): 1981, 1986
  - Runners-up (2): 1977, 1991
- Campeonato Paranaense Série Bronze
  - Winners (1): 2009
  - Runners-up (1): 2014

== Stadium ==
Pato Branco Esporte Clube play their home games at Estádio Os Pioneiros. The stadium has a maximum capacity of 1,500 people.
