= Apucarana Atlético Clube =

Brazilian football club

Apucarana
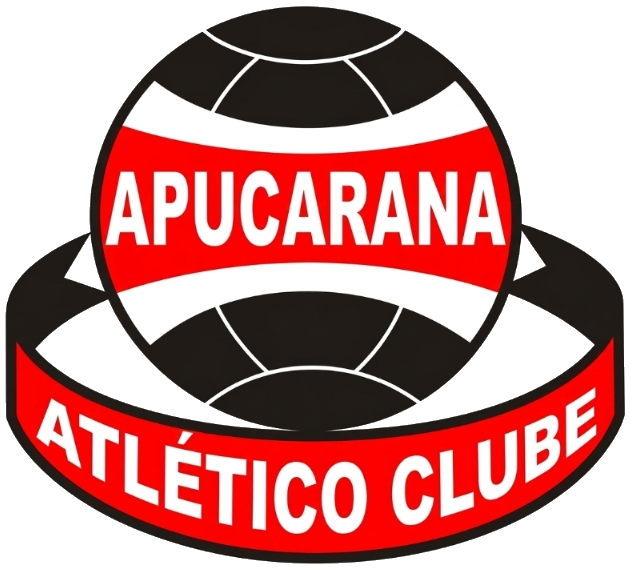
- Full name: Apucarana Atlético Clube
- Founded: 1975
- Dissolved: 1996; 30 years ago
Home colours	Away colours

Apucarana Atlético Clube, usually known simply as Apucarana, was a Brazilian football team from the city of Apucarana, Paraná state, founded in 1975.

Apucarana Atlético Clube played in the first division of the Campeonato Paranaense until 1996, when they were extinct due to financial problems.

== Honours ==
Campeonato Paranaense second division : 1977, 1984
