= Paraná Soccer Technical Center =

Brazilian football club based

PSTC
- Full name: Paraná Soccer Technical Center
- Founded: August 15, 1994 (32 years ago)
- Ground: Estádio Municipal Ubirajara Medeiros
- Capacity: 6,000
- President: Mário Sigueo Iramina
- Head coach: Reginaldo Vital
- League: Campeonato Paranaense
- 2020: Paranaense, 11th (relegated)
Home colors	Away colors

Paraná Soccer Technical Center, more commonly referred to as PSTC, is a Brazilian professional association football club in Cornélio Procópio, Paraná which currently plays in Campeonato Paranaense Third Division, the lowest division of the Paraná state football league.

== History ==
The club was founded on August 15, 1994. PSTC competed in the Campeonato Paranense Third Level in 2010, when they were eliminated in the First Stage of the competition. They reached the Second Stage of the Campeonato Paranense Third Level in 2011, finishing in the fifth position overall in the competition.

In 2013, they started a partnership with the Cornélio Procópio municipality changed their name to PSTC Procopense. They won the Campeonato Paranaense – Segunda Divisão twice (2015 and 2019). In 2017, it played the Copa do Brasil, defeating Ypiranga Futebol Clube in the first phase, but losing against São Paulo FC in the second.

In 2020, PSTC suddenly left the city of Cornélio Procópio for the city of Alvorada do Sul, taking the mayor of the city, Amin Hanouche, completely by surprise.

In 2024, they would return to the first division of the Campeonato Paranaense, being relegated again at the end of the season.

In 2025, the team ended the Campeonato Paranaense Second Division in 10th place, the last place in the competition, being relegated to Campeonato Paranaense Third Division.

== Youth Team ==
PSTC has a successful youth team, which plays the top divisions of the U-15 and U-17 Campeonato Paranaense leagues. Among the players revealed by the team are 2002 FIFA World Cup winner Kléberson, UEFA Champions League winners Fernandinho and Rafinha, and Campeonato Brasileiro Série A winners Jádson and Dagoberto (Brazilian footballer).

== Honours ==
- Campeonato Paranaense Série Prata
  - Champions: 2015, 2019
  - Runners-up (1): 2023

== Stadium ==
Paraná Soccer Technical Center played their home games at CT de Londrina. The stadium has a maximum capacity of 1,000 people. Now they play at Estádio Municipal Ubirajara Medeiros in Cornélio Procópio.
