= Atlético Clube Paranavaí =

Brazilian football club

Paranavaí
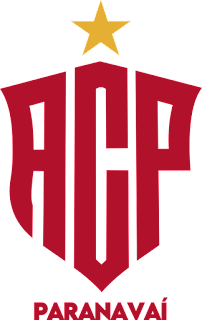
- Full name: Atlético Clube Paranavaí
- Nicknames: Vermelhinho do fim da linha ACP
- Founded: March 14, 1946
- Ground: Estádio Municipal Waldemiro Wagner
- Capacity: 25,000
Home colors	Away colors

Atlético Clube Paranavaí, usually known simply as Paranavaí, is a Brazilian football team from the city of Paranavaí, Paraná state, founded on March 14, 1946.

== History ==
On March 14, 1946, Atlético Clube Paranavaí was founded. In 1967, the club won its first title, which was the Campeonato Paranaense Second Level.

In 2007, Paranavaí won the state championship, after they beat Paraná in the final. In the same year, the club competed in Campeonato Brasileiro Série C, and was eliminated in the first stage of the competition.

== Honours ==
- Campeonato Paranaense
  - Winners (1): 2007
  - Runners-up (1): 2003
- Campeonato Paranaense Second Division
  - Winners (4): 1967, 1983, 1992, 2026
  - Runners-up (1): 2002
- Campeonato Paranaense Third Division
  - Winners (1): 2023
- Campeonato Paranaense do Interior
  - Winners (2): 2003, 2007
