= Bandeirantes, Paraná =

- Municipality
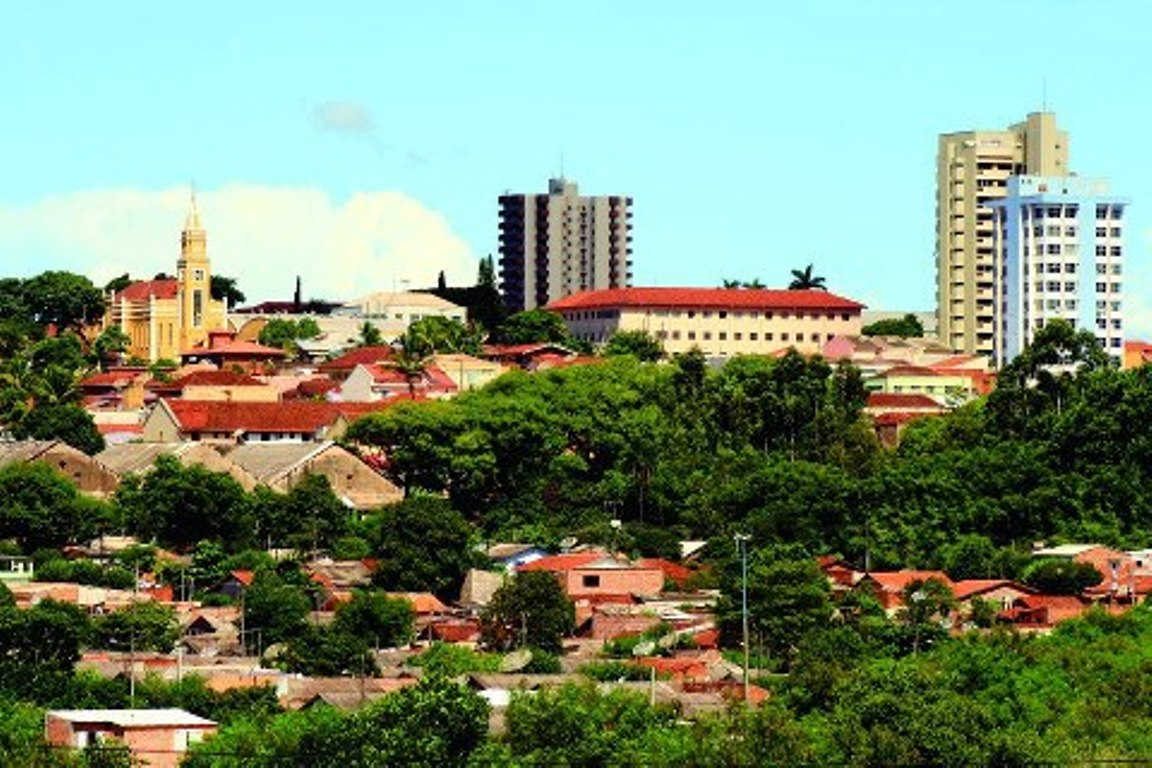

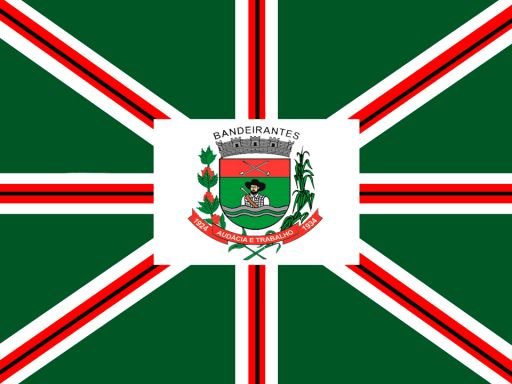
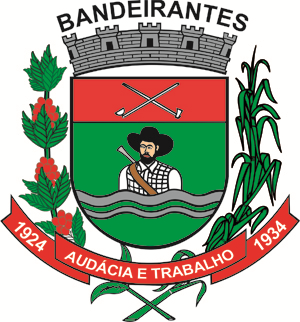
- Flag Coat of arms

- Location in Brazil
- Coordinates: 23°06′27″S 50°22′17″W
- Country: Brazil
- Region: Southern
- State: Paraná
- Mesoregion: Norte Pioneiro Paranaense

Population (2020)
  - Total: 31,211
- Time zone: UTC−3 (BRT)

Bandeirantes is a municipality in the state of Paraná in the Southern Region of Brazil.

== Notable people ==
- Nilmar, footballer, player of the Brazilian Football Team
- Édson Ribeiro, sprinter, Olympic medalist
- Rhodolfo, football player

== Climate ==
Climate data for Bandeirantes, elevation 440 m (1,440 ft), (1976–2019)
Month	Jan	Feb	Mar	Apr	May	Jun	Jul	Aug	Sep	Oct	Nov	Dec	Year
Record high °C (°F)	39.8 (103.6)	39.4 (102.9)	37.6 (99.7)	36.6 (97.9)	33.4 (92.1)	32.6 (90.7)	33.0 (91.4)	36.3 (97.3)	39.0 (102.2)	39.0 (102.2)	40.9 (105.6)	38.2 (100.8)	40.9 (105.6)
Mean daily maximum °C (°F)	30.9 (87.6)	31.3 (88.3)	30.9 (87.6)	29.3 (84.7)	25.9 (78.6)	24.7 (76.5)	25.3 (77.5)	27.6 (81.7)	28.4 (83.1)	30.1 (86.2)	30.6 (87.1)	30.9 (87.6)	28.8 (83.9)
Daily mean °C (°F)	24.8 (76.6)	24.8 (76.6)	24.3 (75.7)	22.5 (72.5)	19.2 (66.6)	17.8 (64.0)	17.9 (64.2)	19.6 (67.3)	21.1 (70.0)	23.1 (73.6)	23.9 (75.0)	24.7 (76.5)	22.0 (71.6)
Mean daily minimum °C (°F)	20.4 (68.7)	20.3 (68.5)	19.5 (67.1)	17.3 (63.1)	14.2 (57.6)	12.6 (54.7)	12.3 (54.1)	13.4 (56.1)	15.3 (59.5)	17.5 (63.5)	18.6 (65.5)	19.9 (67.8)	16.8 (62.2)
Record low °C (°F)	12.0 (53.6)	14.0 (57.2)	8.0 (46.4)	5.0 (41.0)	−1.1 (30.0)	−0.1 (31.8)	−1.9 (28.6)	0.0 (32.0)	2.8 (37.0)	8.5 (47.3)	11.0 (51.8)	13.2 (55.8)	−1.9 (28.6)
Average precipitation mm (inches)	201.1 (7.92)	165.5 (6.52)	129.7 (5.11)	91.0 (3.58)	106.3 (4.19)	78.9 (3.11)	58.7 (2.31)	43.4 (1.71)	102.9 (4.05)	136.8 (5.39)	138.4 (5.45)	173.4 (6.83)	1,426.1 (56.17)
Average precipitation days (≥ 1.0 mm)	14	13	10	7	7	6	5	4	8	10	10	13	107
Average relative humidity (%)	75	75	72	70	73	72	67	61	62	65	67	71	69
Mean monthly sunshine hours	206.2	194.3	221.4	227.2	211.0	202.4	228.5	239.7	204.3	220.9	225.8	215.5	2,597.2
Source: IDR-Paraná

== See also ==
- List of municipalities in Paraná
