= Estádio do Café =

Football stadium in Londrina, Brazil

Coordinates: 23°16′56″S 51°9′54″W

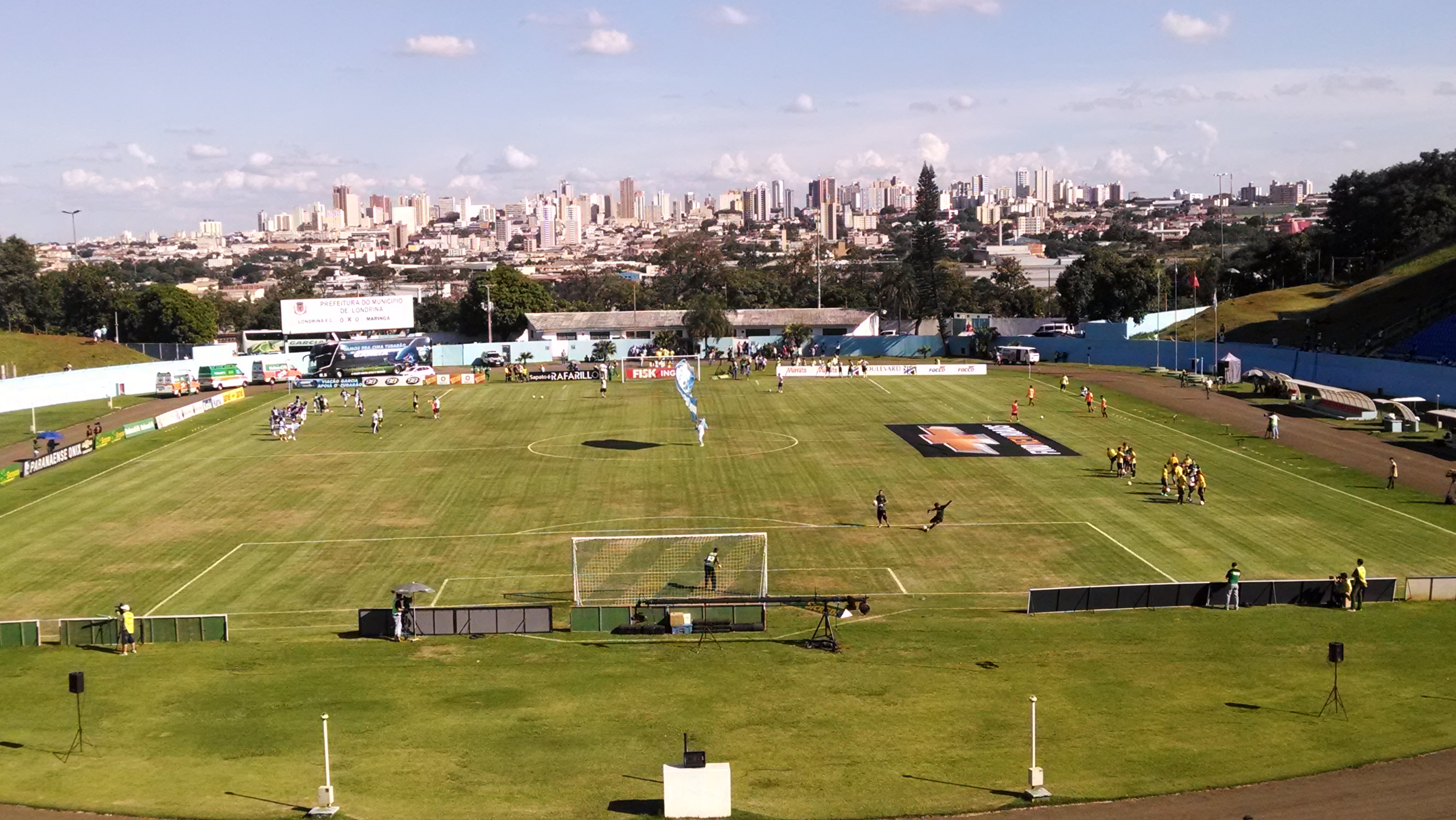
- Sisbrace
- Interactive map of Estádio do Café
- Full name: Estádio Municipal Jacy Scaff
- Location: Londrina, Paraná, Brazil
- Owner: City Hall of Londrina
- Capacity: 30,000
- Surface: Grass

Construction
- Opened: August 22, 1976

Tenants
- Londrina Esporte Clube; Associação Portuguesa Londrinense; Sociedade Esportiva Matsubara

The Estádio Jacy Scaff, usually known as Estádio do Café, is a football stadium inaugurated on August 22, 1976, in Londrina, Paraná, with a maximum capacity of 30,000 people. The stadium is owned by the City Hall of Londrina, and is the home ground of Londrina Esporte Clube and Associação Portuguesa Londrinense. Sociedade Esportiva Matsubara also plays at the stadium. Its formal name honors Jacy Scaff, who is a former president of Londrina Esporte Clube. Its nickname, Café, is due to coffee being one of the most important goods exported by Londrina city.

The stadium is located 4 km away from the city's downtown, close to the Autódromo Internacional Ayrton Senna (Ayrton Senna International Raceway).

Estádio do Café is horseshoe shaped.

== History ==
The stadium was quickly built due to Londrina Esporte Clube's invitation to dispute the 1976 Campeonato Brasileiro Série A.

The inaugural match was played on August 22, 1976, when Londrina and Flamengo drew 1-1. The first goal of the stadium was scored by Londrina's Paraná.

The stadium's attendance record currently stands at 54,178, set on February 15, 1978, when Londrina beat Corinthians 1–0.

In 2000, the stadium hosted matches of the South American Pre-Olympic Football Tournament.

In 2001, due to an electrical energy rationing in Brazil, the Brazilian Football Confederation transferred several matches to Estádio do Café, including Paulista derbies such as Santos-São Paulo and Palmeiras-Santos.
