= Arapongas Esporte Clube =

Arapongas
- Full name: Arapongas Esporte Clube
- Nickname(s): Arapongão
- Founded: June 6, 1974 (50 years ago)
- Ground: Estádio dos Pássaros, Arapongas, Paraná state, Brazil
- Capacity: 10,440
- Website: http://www.arapongasesporteclube.com.br/novosite/
Home colours	Away colours

Arapongas Esporte Clube, commonly known as Arapongas, is a Brazilian football club based in Arapongas, Paraná state.

== History ==
The club was founded on June 6, 1974. In 1978 won the right to the first division the federation inspect the stadium and denied the access to the first division. Arapongas came back again to the professional football division in 1989 in the second division Was champion having the right to play on the first division in 1990.

Was a very strong team with experienced players like Juary (ex santos, Brazil nacional team) Itamar, ze Davi and young players like Luizinho ( luiz Franca) first professional player own by the Arapongas EC in 1989, all other players was free agent players. The club's main investor since 2007 is Adir Leme da Silva. They gained promotion for the 2011 Campeonato Parananese after finishing as runners-up in the 2010 Campeonato Paranaense Second Level.

== Honours ==
- Campeonato Paranaense Série Prata
  - Runners-up (3): 1975, 1989, 2010
- Campeonato Paranaense Série Bronze
  - Runners-up (2): 2001, 2019
- Campeonato Paranaense do Interior
  - Winners (1): 2012

== Stadium ==
Arapongas Esporte Clube play their home games at Estádio Municipal José Luís Chiapin, nicknamed Estádio dos Pássaros. The stadium has a maximum capacity of 10,440 people.
