= Paranavaí =

- Municipality
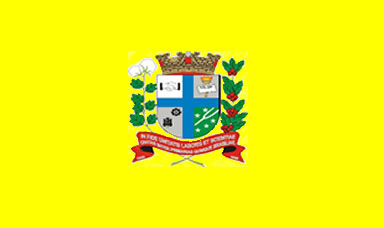
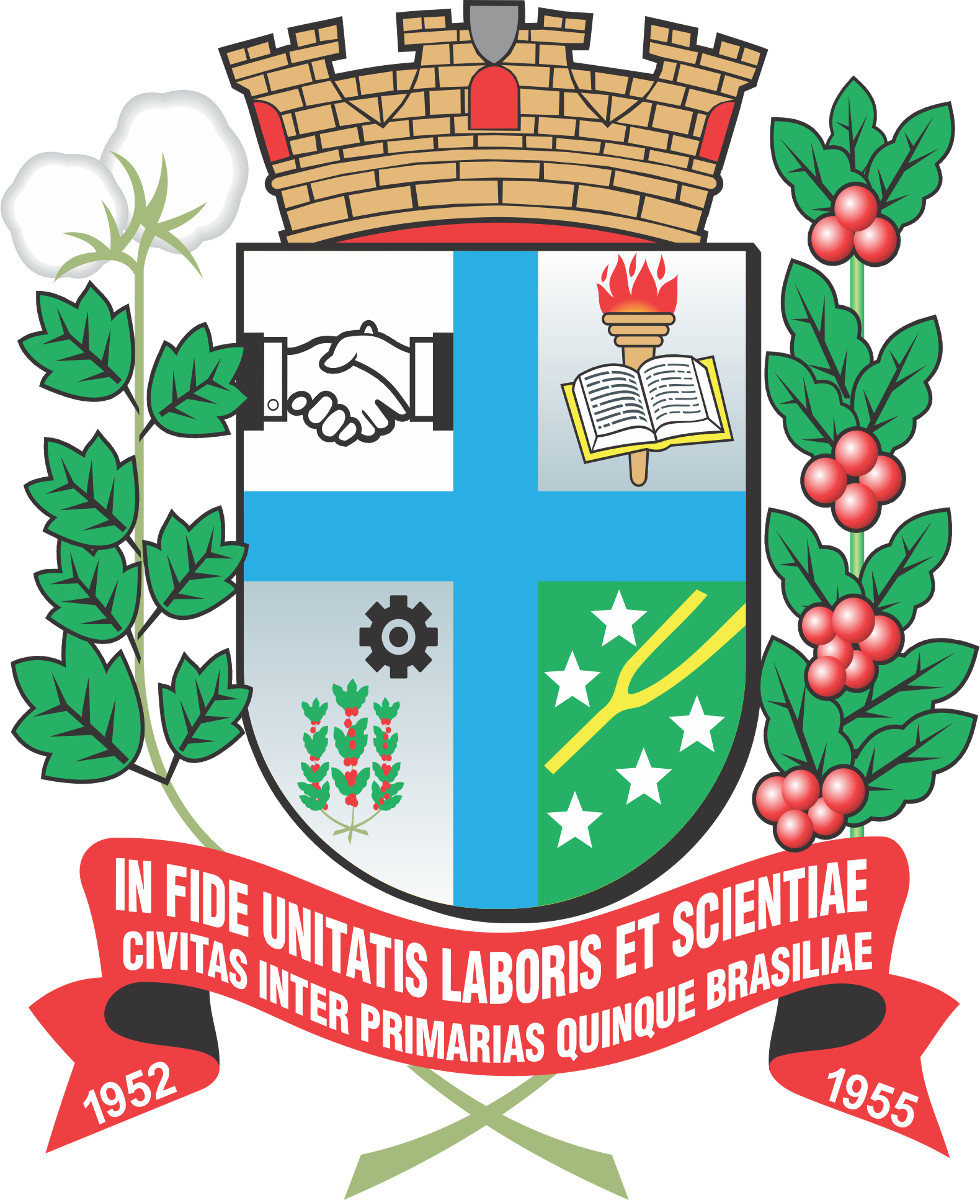
- Flag Coat of arms
- Nickname: Capital do Noroeste (The Capital of Northwest)

- Location in Brazil
- Founded: December 14, 1952

Government
  - Mayor: Carlos Henrique Rossato Gomes - PODE (2021–2024)

Area
  - Total: 1,202.266 km^{2} (464.197 sq mi)
- Elevation: 425 m (1,394 ft)

Population (2024)
  - Total: 95,525
  - Density: 67.86/km^{2} (175.8/sq mi)
- Time zone: UTC-3

Paranavaí is a municipality in the state of Paraná in Brazil that was founded on December 14, 1952. Paranavaí is located in the Northwest part of the state of Paraná, Paranavaí is also one of the richest cities in Paraná and has a population of 95,525 (IBGE, 2024). It constitutes a medium regional centre whose main activities include commerce, services, and agro-industries (cassava flour, chicken, orange). In addition, Paranavaí has some higher education institutions, which include the State College of Education, Science and Letters (FAFIPA-Unespar). Paranavaí is also known for its only professional soccer team, the Atlético Clube Paranavaí - ACP (Paraná State Championship runner-up in 2003 and champion in 2007), and for the Music and Poetry Festival, held every year, which attracts artistic talents from all parts of Brazil.

Paranavaí is served by Edu Chaves Airport.

== Notable people ==
- Miranda Football player

== Climate ==
Climate data for Paranavaí, elevation 480 m (1,570 ft), (1975–2020)
Month	Jan	Feb	Mar	Apr	May	Jun	Jul	Aug	Sep	Oct	Nov	Dec	Year
Record high °C (°F)	37.6 (99.7)	38.8 (101.8)	38.9 (102.0)	35.6 (96.1)	33.4 (92.1)	32.1 (89.8)	33.4 (92.1)	36.4 (97.5)	40.0 (104.0)	41.4 (106.5)	41.5 (106.7)	40.0 (104.0)	41.5 (106.7)
Mean daily maximum °C (°F)	31.1 (88.0)	31.1 (88.0)	30.7 (87.3)	28.9 (84.0)	25.4 (77.7)	24.4 (75.9)	24.9 (76.8)	27.0 (80.6)	27.9 (82.2)	29.7 (85.5)	30.5 (86.9)	30.9 (87.6)	28.5 (83.4)
Daily mean °C (°F)	25.2 (77.4)	25.0 (77.0)	24.6 (76.3)	22.7 (72.9)	19.4 (66.9)	18.3 (64.9)	18.4 (65.1)	20.2 (68.4)	21.4 (70.5)	23.4 (74.1)	24.2 (75.6)	25.0 (77.0)	22.3 (72.2)
Mean daily minimum °C (°F)	21.1 (70.0)	20.9 (69.6)	20.3 (68.5)	18.3 (64.9)	15.4 (59.7)	14.3 (57.7)	13.9 (57.0)	15.3 (59.5)	16.5 (61.7)	18.4 (65.1)	19.4 (66.9)	20.6 (69.1)	17.9 (64.1)
Record low °C (°F)	11.5 (52.7)	13.0 (55.4)	8.4 (47.1)	4.8 (40.6)	2.3 (36.1)	0.5 (32.9)	−3.0 (26.6)	0.0 (32.0)	1.8 (35.2)	8.6 (47.5)	10.0 (50.0)	12.4 (54.3)	−3.0 (26.6)
Average precipitation mm (inches)	186.5 (7.34)	168.3 (6.63)	129.7 (5.11)	97.6 (3.84)	113.5 (4.47)	96.9 (3.81)	65.5 (2.58)	59.8 (2.35)	120.8 (4.76)	156.5 (6.16)	136.7 (5.38)	175.4 (6.91)	1,507.2 (59.34)
Average precipitation days (≥ 1.0 mm)	14	13	10	7	8	7	6	5	8	10	10	13	111
Average relative humidity (%)	74	74	72	71	73	72	65	59	62	66	66	71	69
Mean monthly sunshine hours	218.6	199.5	231.2	226.0	210.4	200.0	228.2	234.9	198.7	223.7	234.4	222.5	2,628.1
Source: IDR-Paraná
