= Toledo Esporte Clube =

Association football club in Brazil

Toledo
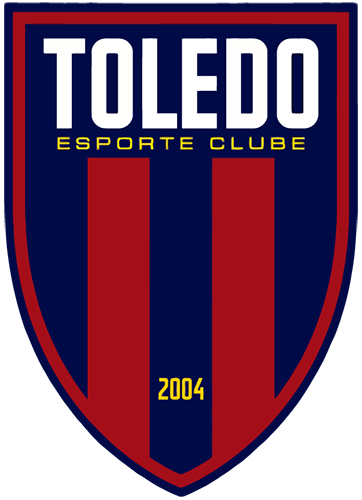
- Full name: Toledo Esporte Clube
- Founded: 10 February 2004; 22 years ago
- Ground: Estádio Municipal 14 de Dezembro
- Capacity: 15,280
- President: Carlos Dulaba
- Head coach: Paulo Baier
- League: Campeonato Paranaense Série Prata
- 2025: Paranaense Série Prata, 8th of 10
Home colours	Away colours

Toledo Esporte Clube, commonly known as Toledo, is a Brazilian professional association football club based in Toledo, Paraná, that competes in the Série D, the fourth tier of Brazilian football, as well as in the Campeonato Paranaense, the top division of the Paraná state football league.

== History ==
The club was founded on 10 February 2004. They won the Campeonato Paranaense Second Level in 2007, when they beat Real Brasil, Auritânia and Francisco Beltrão in the final stage of the competition. Toledo competed in the Série C in 2008, when they were eliminated in the Second Stage.

The club won the 2019 Taça Barcímio Sicupira, its first Campeonato Paranaense title.

== Honours ==
- Campeonato Paranaense
  - Runners-up (1): 2019
- Copa Paraná
  - Runners-up (1): 2015
- Campeonato Paranaense Série Prata
  - Winners (1): 2007
  - Runners-up (3): 2005, 2011, 2015
- Campeonato Paranaense do Interior
  - Winners (1): 2008
- Taça Barcímio Sucipira Júnior
  - Winners (1): 2019

== Stadium ==
Toledo Colônia Work play their home games at Estádio Municipal 14 de Dezembro. The stadium has a maximum capacity of 20,280 people.
