= Rolândia =

- Municipality
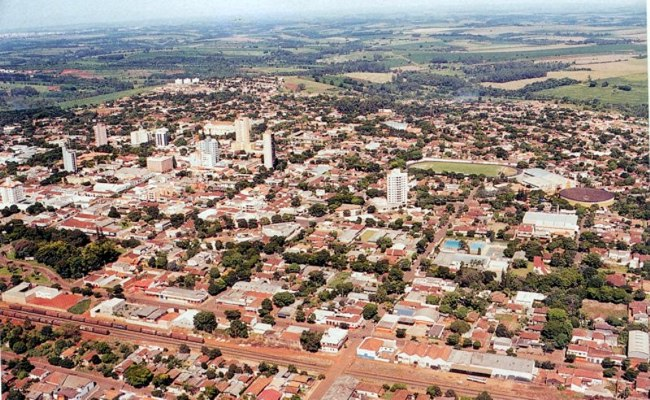

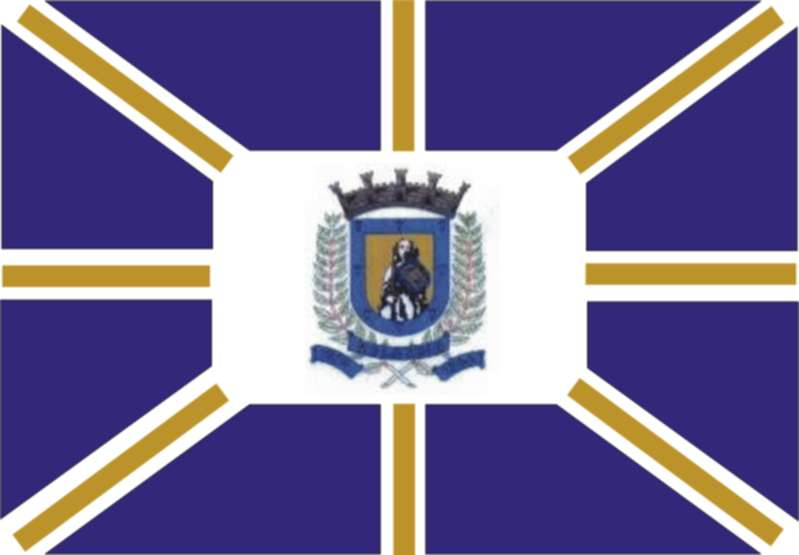
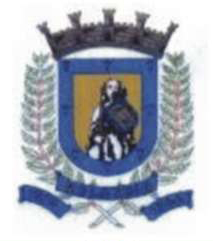
- Flag Coat of arms
- Interactive map of Rolândia
- Coordinates: 23°18′S 51°22′W
- Country: Brazil
- Region: Southern
- State: Paraná
- Mesoregion: Norte Central Paranaense

Population (2022 (Census))
  - Total: 71,670
  - Estimate (2025): 75,818
  - Density: 326.5/sq mi (126.05/km^{2})
- Time zone: UTC -3

Rolândia is a municipality in the state of Paraná in the Southern Region of Brazil. Rolândia was settled by German immigrants who named it after (and erected a statue to) the medieval hero Roland, a symbol of freedom in Germany.

== People ==
- Erich Koch-Weser (born 1875: died 1944), German politician, died in Rolandia

== See also ==
- List of municipalities in Paraná
