= Rio Branco Sport Club =

Brazilian professional football club

Rio Branco
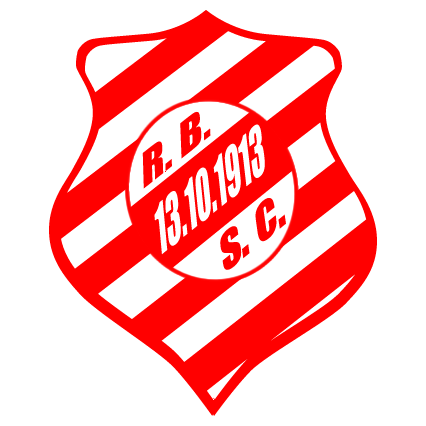
- Full name: Rio Branco Sport Club
- Nickname: Leão da Estradinha (Lion of the Estradinha)
- Founded: October 13, 1913; 112 years ago
- Ground: Estradinha
- Capacity: 8,000
- President: Thiago Campos
- Head coach: Tcheco
- League: Campeonato Paranaense Série Prata
- 2025: Paranaense, 11th of 12 (relegated)
Home colours	Away colours

Rio Branco Sport Club, more commonly referred to as Rio Branco do Paraná or simply Rio Branco, is a Brazilian professional association football club in Paranaguá, Paraná which currently plays in Campeonato Paranaense Série Prata, the second division of the Paraná state football league.

== History ==
On October 13, 1913, Rio Branco Sport Club was founded by Anibal José de Lima, Raul da Costa Pinto, Euclides de Oliveira, Manoel Victor da Costa, Antônio Gomes de Miranda, José de Oliveira, Antônio Ferrer da Rosa and Jarbas Nery Chichorro.

In 1915, Rio Branco disputed the first Campeonato Paranaense. The club finished in the last position of all the six participating teams.

In 1956, Rio Branco professionalized its football section, and disputed the Campeonato Paranaense Divisão Especial (which was the second division). Its first professional match was played against Água Verde. Rio Branco won 3–2.

In 1996, Rio Branco disputed the Campeonato Brasileiro Série C. The club was eliminated by Figueirense in the third stage.

In 2000, the club disputed the Copa João Havelange. The club was in the White module, which was the equivalent of a third level. Rio Branco was eliminated in the second stage.

In 2005, the club was administered by four entrepreneurs, Mário Roque, José Carlos Possas, José Manuel Chaves and Marquinhos Roque.

== Honours ==
- Campeonato Paranaense Série Prata
  - Winners (1): 1995
  - Runners-up (2): 1970, 2024
- Campeonato Paranaense do Interior
  - Winners (3): 1948, 1954, 2000
- Torneio Início do Paraná
  - Winners (3): 1962, 1963, 1964

== Stadium ==
Rio Branco's home stadium is Estádio da Estradinha (its official name is Estádio Nelson Medrado Dias), inaugurated in 1927, with a maximum capacity of 8,000 people.

== Mascot ==
The club's mascot is a lion.

== Nickname ==
Rio Branco is nicknamed Leão da Estradinha, meaning Lion of the Little Road. This nickname is due to the club's brave playstyle. Estradinha is the name of the club's neighborhood.

== Club colors ==
The club colors are red and white.

== Ultra groups ==
There are several ultra groups supporting the club:

- Mancha Vermelha
- Os Fanáticos do Leão
- Torcida Fiel do Leão

== Miscellaneous ==
- Rio Branco Sport Club is the third oldest Paraná state club, only behind Coritiba, founded in 1909, and Operário-PR, founded in 1912.
- Rio Branco and Coritiba are the only state clubs which did not change their names or colors.
