= 2026 Campeonato Paranaense =

Football competition in Brazil

Campeonato Paranaense
- Season: 2026
- Dates: 6 January - 7 March
- Champions: Operário Ferroviário
- Relegated: Andraus; Galo Maringá
- Copa do Brasil: Athletico Paranaense; Coritiba; Londrina; Operário Ferroviário
- Série D: Azuriz; Foz do Iguaçu; São Joseense
- Matches: 54
- Goals: 132 (2.44 per match)

The 2026 Campeonato Paranaense (officially the Campeonato Paranaense de Futebol Profissional da 1ª Divisão - Temporada 2026) was the 112th edition of the top division of football in the state of Paraná organized by FPF. The competition began on 6 January and ended on 7 March 2026. Operário Ferroviário were the defending champions.

== Format ==
In the first stage, the teams were divided into two groups of six, with each group playing a single round-robin tournament against the teams in the other group. The teams were ranked according to points. If tied on points, the following criteria would be used to determine the ranking: 1. Wins; 2. Goal difference; 3. Goals scored; 4. Head-to-head results (only between two teams); 5. Fewest red cards; 6. Fewest yellow cards; 7. Draw in the headquarters of the FPF. The top four teams in each group advanced to the final stages, while the bottom two will play in the relegation playoffs.

The relegation playoffs will be played on a home-and-away, two-legged basis, with the teams' performance in the first stage determining which leg they play in. If tied on aggregate, the penalty shoot-out will be used to determine the winners.

The Final stages will be played on a home-and-away two-legged basis, with the best overall performance team hosting the second leg. If tied on aggregate, the penalty shoot-out will be used to determine the winners.

The number of berths available for the 2027 Copa do Brasil and the 2027 Copa Sul-Sudeste will depend on whether the Taça FPF is held in the second half of 2026. These berths, along with those for the 2027 Série D, will be allocated based on the overall tournament standings.

== Participating teams ==
Club	Home city	Manager	2025 result	Titles (last)
Andraus	Campo Largo	Juba	10th	0
Athletico Paranaense	Curitiba	Odair Hellmann	4th	28 (2024)
Azuriz	Pato Branco	Alexandre Gallo	7th	0
Cianorte	Cianorte	Rafael Ferro	6th	0
Coritiba	Curitiba	Fernando Seabra	5th	39 (2022)
FC Cascavel	Cascavel	César Bueno	9th	0
Foz do Iguaçu	Foz do Iguaçu	Adriano Souza	2th (Seg.)	0
Galo Maringá	Maringá	Rafael Sundermann	1st (Seg.)	0
Londrina	Londrina	Allan Aal	3rd	5 (2021)
Maringá	Maringá	Rodrigo Chipp	2nd	0
Operário Ferroviário	Ponta Grossa	Luizinho Lopes	1st	2 (2025)
São Joseense	São José dos Pinhais	Ageu	8th	0

== First stage ==
=== Group A ===
Pos	Team	Pld	W	D	L	GF	GA	GD	Pts	Qualification
1	Londrina	6	4	2	0	14	3	+11	14	Advance to quarter-finals
2	Foz do Iguaçu	6	3	2	1	11	10	+1	11	Advance to quarter-finals
3	Athletico Paranaense	6	3	1	2	10	6	+4	10	Advance to quarter-finals
4	São Joseense	6	3	1	2	4	3	+1	10	Advance to quarter-finals
5	Maringá	6	2	2	2	9	7	+2	8	Advance to relegation playoffs
6	FC Cascavel	6	1	3	2	5	6	−1	6	Advance to relegation playoffs

Source: FPF

=== Group B ===
Pos	Team	Pld	W	D	L	GF	GA	GD	Pts	Qualification
1	Azuriz	6	3	2	1	5	4	+1	11	Advance to quarter-finals
2	Coritiba	6	2	2	2	7	7	0	8	Advance to quarter-finals
3	Cianorte	6	1	4	1	8	8	0	7	Advance to quarter-finals
4	Operário Ferroviário	6	1	2	3	4	8	−4	5	Advance to quarter-finals
5	Andraus	6	1	1	4	6	13	−7	4	Advance to relegation playoffs
6	Galo Maringá	6	1	0	5	5	13	−8	3	Advance to relegation playoffs

Source: FPF

== Relegation playoffs ==
=== Group 1 ===
1 February 2026
18:30

Galo Maringá	0–5	Maringá
	Report	Caíque Calito 1', 21', 29'; Edison Negueba 25'; Paulinho 81'

Estádio Willie Davids, Maringá
Attendance: 1,102
Referee: João Marcos dos Santos Velloso

7 February 2026
20:00

Maringá	2–0	Galo Maringá
Gabriel Souza 60', 67'

Estádio Willie Davids, Maringá
Referee: Marco Antônio dos Santos Travessolo

Galo Maringá were relegated to the 2027 Campeonato Paranaense da 2ª Divisão

=== Group 2 ===
4 February 2026
20:00

Andraus	0–1	FC Cascavel
	Report	Geovane Henrique 90'

Estádio Vila Capanema, Curitiba
Attendance: 120
Referee: Robson Babinski

11 February 2026
20:00

FC Cascavel	2–1	Andraus
Kauhe Galdino 57'; Borech 66'		Lucas Bueno 70'

Estádio Olímpico Regional Jacy Miguel Scanagatta, Cascavel
Referee: Matheus Bortolini

Andraus were relegated to the 2027 Campeonato Paranaense da 2ª Divisão

== Final stage ==
=== Bracket ===
Quarter-finals
Operário Ferroviário	2	2	4
Azuriz	0	0	0
Cianorte	0	0	0
Coritiba	1	2	3
São Joseense	1	1	2 (0)
Londrina (p)	1	1	2 (3)
Athletico Paranaense	5	3	8
Foz do Iguaçu	0	1	1

Semi-finals
Operário Ferroviário (p)	2	2	4 (6)
Coritiba	2	2	4 (5)
Londrina	2	1	3
Athletico Paranaense	2	0	2

Finals
Operário Ferroviário (p)	0	0	0 (4)
Londrina	0	0	0 (3)

=== Quarter-finals ===
Team 1	Agg.	Team 2	1st leg	2nd leg
São Joseense	2–2 (0–3 p)	Londrina	1–1	1–1
Athletico Paranaense	8–1	Foz do Iguaçu	5–0	3–1
Operário Ferroviário	4–0	Azuriz	2–0	2–0
Cianorte	0–3	Coritiba	0–1	0–2

==== Group C ====
1 February 2026
16:00

São Joseense	1–1	Londrina
Pedrinho 48'	Report	Vitinho 18'

Estádio Couto Pereira, Curitiba
Attendance: 3,507
Referee: Lucas Paulo Torezin

7 February 2026
18:30

Londrina	1–1	São Joseense
Bruno Santos 45+3'		Wellington Júnior 8'
Penalties
Iago Teles (penalty scored); Gilberto (penalty scored); Vítor Jacaré (penalty missed); Caio Maia (penalty scored)	3–0	(penalty missed) João Mafra; (penalty missed) Murillo Lima; (penalty missed) Rodolfo Filemon

Estádio do Café, Londrina
Referee: José Mendonça da Silva Júnior

Londrina qualified for the semi-finals.

==== Group D ====
3 February 2026
20:00

Athletico Paranaense	5–0	Foz do Iguaçu
Zapelli 26'; Viveros 28'; Esquivel 62'; Julimar 69'; Leozinho 89'	Report

Arena da Baixada, Curitiba
Attendance: 12,111
Referee: José Mendonça da Silva Júnior

7 February 2026
16:00

Foz do Iguaçu	1–3	Athletico Paranaense
Habraão 38' (o.g.)		Diogo Riquelme 7'; Raul 10'; Bruninho 45+1'

Estádio do ABC, Foz do Iguaçu
Referee: João Marcos dos Santos Velloso

Athletico Paranaense qualified for the semi-finals.

==== Group E ====
1 February 2026
18:30

Operário Ferroviário	2–0	Azuriz
Vinícius Diniz 17'; Moraes 39'	Report

Estádio Germano Krüger, Ponta Grossa
Attendance: 3,369
Referee: Kleber Ariel Gonçalves Silva

8 February 2026
18:30

Azuriz	0–2	Operário Ferroviário
		E. Torres 33'; Boschilia 77'

Estádio Os Pioneiros, Pato Branco
Referee: Lucas Paulo Torezin

Operário Ferroviário qualified for the semi-finals.

==== Group F ====
31 January 2026
16:00

Cianorte	0–1	Coritiba
	Report	Pedro Rangel 87'

Estádio Municipal Olímpico Albino Turbay, Cianorte
Attendance: 1,004
Referee: Lucas Casagrande

8 February 2026
18:30

Coritiba	2–0	Cianorte
Fabinho 8'; Josué 72'

Estádio Couto Pereira, Curitiba
Referee: Rodolpho Toski Marques

Coritiba qualified for the semi-finals.

=== Semi-finals ===
Team 1	Agg.	Team 2	1st leg	2nd leg
Londrina	3–2	Athletico Paranaense	2–2	1–0
Operário Ferroviário	4–4 (6–5 p)	Coritiba	2–2	2–2

==== Group G ====
15 February 2026
18:30

Londrina	2–2	Athletico Paranaense
André Luiz 6'; Lucas Marques 72'		Chiqueti 15', 21'

Estádio do Café, Londrina
Referee: Lucas Casagrande

22 February 2026
16:00

Athletico Paranaense	0–1	Londrina
		Bruno Santos 4'

Arena da Baixada, Curitiba
Referee: Rodolpho Toski Marques

Londrina qualified for the finals.

==== Group H ====
14 February 2026
16:00

Operário Ferroviário	2–2	Coritiba
Boschilia 68' (pen.); Gabriel Feliciano 76'		Pedro Rocha 13', 45+1'

Estádio Germano Krüger, Ponta Grossa
Referee: José Mendonça da Silva Júnior

21 February 2026
16:00

Coritiba	2–2	Operário Ferroviário
Maicon 47'; Lucas Ronier 60'		Léo Gaúcho 45+3'; Aylon 57'
Penalties
Bruno Melo (penalty scored); Lavega (penalty missed); Fernando Sobral (penalty scored); Keno (penalty scored); Josué (penalty scored); Tinga (penalty scored); Maicon (penalty missed)	5–6	(penalty scored) Boschilia; (penalty missed) Índio; (penalty scored) Gabriel Feliciano; (penalty scored) Neto Paraíba; (penalty scored) Aylon; (penalty scored) Mikael Doka; (penalty scored) E. Torres

Estádio Couto Pereira, Curitiba
Referee: Lucas Paulo Torezin

Operário Ferroviário qualified for the finals.

=== Finals ===
Team 1	Agg.	Team 2	1st leg	2nd leg
Operário Ferroviário	0–0 (4–3 p)	Londrina	0–0	0–0

==== Group I ====
28 February 2026
16:00

Operário Ferroviário	0–0	Londrina

Estádio Germano Krüger, Ponta Grossa
Referee: Lucas Casagrande

Operário Ferroviário	Londrina

GK	33	(Brazil) Vágner Silva
DF	2	(Brazil) Mikael Doka
DF	22	(Colombia) José Cuenú
DF	16	(Brazil) Miranda
DF	6	(Brazil) Moraes	(substituted off) 70'
MF	5	(Brazil) Índio	(substituted off) 76'
MF	20	(Brazil) Vinícius Diniz	(substituted off) 70'
MF	10	(Brazil) Boschilia (c)
FW	14	(Cape Verde) Hildeberto Pereira	(substituted off) 57'
FW	99	(Brazil) Léo Gaúcho
FW	11	(Brazil) Aylon	(substituted off) 76'
Substitutes:
GK	1	(Brazil) Elias Curzel
DF	3	(Brazil) Charles Raphael
DF	4	(Brazil) André
DF	18	(Colombia) Jhan Pool Torres
DF	23	(Brazil) João Gabriel
DF	27	(Brazil) Gabriel Feliciano	(substituted on) 57'
MF	8	(Colombia) Juan Pablo Zuluaga	(substituted on) 76'
MF	39	(Brazil) Matheus Trindade	(substituted on) 76'
MF	88	(Brazil) Neto Paraíba	(substituted on) 70'
FW	19	(Brazil) Kauã Gomes
FW	28	(Brazil) Dudu Mosconi
FW	29	(Colombia) Edwin Torres	(substituted on) 70'
Coach:
(Brazil) Luizinho Lopes

GK	30	(Brazil) Maurício Kozlinski
DF	6	(Brazil) Maurício Júnior	(yellow card) 83'	(substituted off) 86'
DF	3	(Brazil) Yago Lincoln
DF	4	(Brazil) Wallace (c)
DF	33	(Brazil) Kevyn
MF	5	(Brazil) André Luiz		(substituted off) 72'
MF	8	(Brazil) Lucas Marques
MF	32	(Brazil) João Tavares		(substituted off) 61'
FW	18	(Brazil) Paulinho Moccelin	(yellow card) 32'	(substituted off) 72'
FW	11	(Brazil) Iago Teles
FW	9	(Brazil) Bruno Santos		(substituted off) 86'
Substitutes:
GK	1	(Brazil) Luan Ribeiro
DF	13	(Brazil) André Dhominique		(substituted on) 86'
DF	15	(Brazil) Gabriel Lacerda
DF	34	(Brazil) Heron
DF	55	(Brazil) Rafael Monteiro
MF	17	(Brazil) André Cardoso
MF	20	(Brazil) Fabiano		(substituted on) 72'
MF	53	(Brazil) Chumbinho
FW	19	(Brazil) João Pedro
FW	29	(Brazil) Vítor Jacaré		(substituted on) 72'
FW	70	(Brazil) Gilberto		(substituted on) 86'
FW	77	(Brazil) Juninho		(substituted on) 61'
Coach:
(Brazil) Allan Aal

Assistant referees:
Victor Hugo Imazu dos Santos
Andrey Luiz de Freitas
Fourth official:
Maykon Brito de Freitas
Video assistant referee:
Rodolpho Toski Marques
Assistant video assistant referees:
Luciano Roggenbaum

7 March 2026
16:00

Londrina	0–0	Operário Ferroviário
Penalties
Iago Teles (penalty missed); Gilberto (penalty scored); Vítor Jacaré (penalty scored); André Luiz (penalty missed); Wallace (penalty scored)	3–4	(penalty scored) Boschilia; (penalty missed) Léo Gaúcho; (penalty scored) Neto Paraíba; (penalty scored) Matheus Trindade; (penalty scored) Gabriel Feliciano

Estádio do Café, Londrina
Referee: Lucas Paulo Torezin

Londrina	Operário Ferroviário

GK	30	(Brazil) Maurício Kozlinski
DF	13	(Brazil) André Dhominique		(substituted off) 87'
DF	3	(Brazil) Yago Lincoln
DF	4	(Brazil) Wallace (c)	Booked
DF	33	(Brazil) Kevyn
MF	5	(Brazil) André Luiz
MF	8	(Brazil) Lucas Marques		(substituted off) 59'
MF	7	(Brazil) Vitinho Mota		(substituted off) 59'
FW	18	(Brazil) Paulinho Moccelin		(substituted off) 80'
FW	11	(Brazil) Iago Teles
FW	9	(Brazil) Bruno Santos		(substituted off) 87'
Substitutes:
GK	1	(Brazil) Luan Ribeiro
DF	15	(Brazil) Gabriel Lacerda
DF	34	(Brazil) Heron
DF	55	(Brazil) Rafael Monteiro
MF	20	(Brazil) Fabiano		(substituted on) 59'
MF	32	(Brazil) João Tavares
MF	53	(Brazil) Chumbinho	(red card) 90+4'	(substituted on) 87'
FW	19	(Brazil) João Pedro
FW	28	(Brazil) Caio Maia
FW	29	(Brazil) Vítor Jacaré		(substituted on) 80'
FW	70	(Brazil) Gilberto		(substituted on) 59'
FW	77	(Brazil) Juninho		(substituted on) 87'
Coach:
(Brazil) Allan Aal

GK	33	(Brazil) Vágner Silva
DF	2	(Brazil) Mikael Doka		(substituted off) 81'
DF	22	(Colombia) José Cuenú	(yellow card) 71'
DF	16	(Brazil) Miranda	Booked
DF	6	(Brazil) Moraes		(substituted off) 67'
MF	5	(Brazil) Índio		(substituted off) 81'
MF	20	(Brazil) Vinícius Diniz	(yellow card) 66' (yellow-red card) 90+4'
MF	10	(Brazil) Boschilia (c)
FW	14	(Cape Verde) Hildeberto Pereira		(substituted off) 63'
FW	99	(Brazil) Léo Gaúcho
FW	11	(Brazil) Aylon		(substituted off) 68'
Substitutes:
GK	1	(Brazil) Elias Curzel
DF	3	(Brazil) Charles Raphael
DF	4	(Brazil) André
DF	18	(Colombia) Jhan Pool Torres
DF	23	(Brazil) João Gabriel
DF	27	(Brazil) Gabriel Feliciano		(substituted on) 67'
MF	8	(Colombia) Juan Pablo Zuluaga		(substituted on) 81'
MF	39	(Brazil) Matheus Trindade		(substituted on) 68'
MF	88	(Brazil) Neto Paraíba		(substituted on) 81'
FW	19	(Brazil) Kauã Gomes
FW	28	(Brazil) Dudu Mosconi
FW	29	(Colombia) Edwin Torres		(substituted on) 63'
Coach:
(Brazil) Luizinho Lopes

Assistant referees:
Bruno Boschilia
Rafael Trombeta
Fourth official:
Murilo Ugolini Klein
Video assistant referee:
Rodolpho Toski Marques
Assistant video assistant referees:
Sidmar Dos Santos Meurer

== Overall table ==
Pos	Team	Pld	W	D	L	GF	GA	GD	Pts	Qualification or relegation
1	Operário Ferroviário	12	3	6	3	12	12	0	15	Champions and 2027 Copa do Brasil
2	Londrina	12	5	7	0	19	7	+12	22	Runners-up and 2027 Copa do Brasil
3	Athletico Paranaense	10	5	2	3	20	10	+10	17	2027 Copa do Brasil
4	Coritiba	10	4	4	2	14	11	+3	16	2027 Copa do Brasil
5	São Joseense	8	3	3	2	6	5	+1	12	2027 Série D
6	Azuriz	8	3	2	3	5	8	−3	11	2027 Série D
7	Foz do Iguaçu	8	3	2	3	12	18	−6	11	2027 Série D
8	Cianorte	8	1	4	3	8	11	−3	7	
9	Maringá	8	4	2	2	16	7	+9	14	
10	FC Cascavel	8	3	3	2	8	7	+1	12	
11	Andraus	8	1	1	6	7	16	−9	4	Relegation to 2027 Campeonato Paranaense - Segunda Divisão
12	Galo Maringá	8	1	0	7	5	20	−15	3	Relegation to 2027 Campeonato Paranaense - Segunda Divisão

Source: FPF
