= 2025 Operário Ferroviário Esporte Clube season =

Brazilian football club season

Operário Ferroviário Esporte Clube
2025 season
- Manager: Bruno Pivetti
- Stadium: Estádio Germano Krüger
- Série B: 12th
- Top goalscorer: League: Gabriel Boschilia (9); All: Gabriel Boschilia (9)
- Average home league attendance: 3,502

The 2025 season was the 111th year of Operário Ferroviário Esporte Clube’s history. The team competed in the Campeonato Brasileiro Série B for the second consecutive season, the Campeonato Paranaense, and the Copa do Brasil.

== Squad ==
=== Transfers Out ===
Pos.	Player	Transferred to	Fee	Date	Source
MF	(Brazil) João Denoni	(Brazil) Villa Nova	Undisclosed	14 January 2025	

== Exhibition matches ==
5 January 2025	Operário Ferroviário	0–0	Marcílio Dias

== Competitions ==
=== Overall record ===
Competition	First match	Last match	Starting round	Final position	Record							
Competition	First match	Last match	Starting round	Final position	Pld	W	D	L	GF	GA	GD	Win %
Campeonato Brasileiro Série B	5 April 2025	23 November 2025	Matchday 1	12th	38	12	12	14	40	44	−4	31.58
Campeonato Paranaense	12 January 2025				3	2	1	0	4	1	+3	66.67
Copa do Brasil					0	0	0	0	0	0	+0	—
Total					41	14	13	14	44	45	−1	34.15

Source: Competitions

=== Série B ===
==== League table ====
Pos	Team	Pld	W	D	L	GF	GA	GD	Pts
10	Cuiabá	38	14	12	12	43	44	−1	54
11	Atlético Goianiense	38	13	13	12	39	38	+1	52
12	Operário Ferroviário	38	12	12	14	40	44	−4	48
13	Vila Nova	38	11	14	13	40	44	−4	47
14	América Mineiro	38	12	10	16	41	44	−3	46

Source: CBF
Rules for classification: 1) points; 2) wins; 3) goal difference; 4) goals scored; 5) head-to-head results (only between 2 teams); 6) fewest red cards; 7) fewest yellow cards; 8) drawing of lots.

==== Results summary ====
Overall								Home						Away					
Pld	W	D	L	GF	GA	GD	Pts	W	D	L	GF	GA	GD	W	D	L	GF	GA	GD
38	12	12	14	40	44	−4	48	9	6	4	26	18	+8	3	6	10	14	26	−12

==== Matches ====
14 September 2025 26	Operário Ferroviário	1–1	Cuiabá

18 September 2025 27	Botafogo-SP	1–1	Operário Ferroviário

24 September 2025 28	Operário Ferroviário	2–1	Amazonas

27 September 2025 29	Athletico Paranaense	1–0	Operário Ferroviário

5 October 2025 30	Operário Ferroviário	0–1	Remo

8 October 2025 31	Operário Ferroviário	1–4	Athletic

12 October 2025 32	Novorizontino	3–0	Operário Ferroviário

19 October 2025 33	Operário Ferroviário	2–1	Volta Redonda

27 October 2025 34	Chapecoense	2–0	Operário Ferroviário

2 November 2025 35	Operário Ferroviário	2–2	Vila Nova

9 November 2025 36	CRB	2–2	Operário Ferroviário

15 November 2025 37	Atlético Goianiense	0–0	Operário Ferroviário

23 November 2025 38	Operário Ferroviário	2–1	Ferroviária

=== Campeonato Paranaense ===
Pos	Team	Pld	W	D	L	GF	GA	GD	Pts	Qualification or relegation
1	Operário Ferroviário	11	6	4	1	18	7	+11	22	Advance to Final stage
2	Athletico Paranaense	11	6	4	1	19	9	+10	22	Advance to Final stage
3	Coritiba	11	6	2	3	19	8	+11	20	Advance to Final stage
4	Londrina	11	6	2	3	16	10	+6	20	Advance to Final stage
5	Cianorte	11	5	2	4	18	13	+5	17	Advance to Final stage

Source: FPF

==== Results by round ====
Round	1	2	3
Ground	H	A	H
Result	W	D	W
Position			

Updated to match(es) played on 19 January 2025. Source:
A = Away; H = Home; W = Win; D = Draw; L = Loss

12 January 2025 1	Operário Ferroviário	1–0	Andraus Brasil	Ponta Grossa
16:00 UTC−3	Boschilia 67'			Stadium: Estádio Germano Krüger

16 January 2025 2	Paraná	1–1	Operário Ferroviário	Curitiba
20:00 UTC−3	43'; (red card) 88'		Boschilia 90+7' (pen.)	Stadium: Vila Capanema

19 January 2025 3	Operário Ferroviário	2–0	Rio Branco	Ponta Grossa
18:30 UTC−3	57' (o.g.); 88'			Stadium: Estádio Germano Krüger

22 January 2025 4	Athletico Paranaense	v	Operário Ferroviário
20:00 UTC−3

=== Copa do Brasil ===
==== Third round ====
1 May 2025 First leg	Operário Ferroviário	1–1	Vasco da Gama	Ponta Grossa
16:00	Boschilia 71'	Report	Moreira 20'	Stadium: Germano Krüger; Referee: Anderson Daronco

20 May 2025 Second leg	Vasco da Gama	v	Operário Ferroviário	Rio de Janeiro
19:00 UTC−3		Report		Stadium: São Januário
