= 2026 Londrina Esporte Clube season =

Londrina Esporte Clube
2026 season
- Manager: Rogério Micale (14 May–10 October); Hugo Emanuel Barros Chacon (from 12 October)
- Stadium: Estádio do Café
- Campeonato Brasileiro Série B: 18th (relegated)

The 2026 season was the 70th in the history of Londrina Esporte Clube and their first back in the Campeonato Brasileiro Série B. The Paraná-based club finished the season in 18th place, returning to Série C after just one year.

== Transfers ==
=== In ===
Pos.	Player	Transferred from	Fee	Date	Source
DF	(Brazil) André Dhominique	(Brazil) Bahia	Undisclosed	1 January 2026	
MF	(Brazil) André Luiz	(Brazil) Volta Redonda	Undisclosed	1 January 2026	
FW	(Brazil) Bruno Santos	(Brazil) Univassouras Artsul	Free	1 January 2026	
GK	(Brazil) Maurício Kozlinski	Unattached		1 January 2026	
MF	(Brazil) Paulinho Moccelin	(Indonesia) Arema	Free	1 January 2026	
DF	(Brazil) Yago Lincoln	(Brazil) Ceará	Undisclosed	1 January 2026	
DF	(Brazil) Kevyn Lucas	(Brazil) Ponte Preta	Free	6 January 2026	
DF	(Brazil) Heron	(Brazil) Atlético Goianiense	Undisclosed	9 January 2026	
MF	(Brazil) Thalis	(Bulgaria) CSKA 1948 Sofia	Free	20 February 2026	
DF	(Brazil) Weverton	(Brazil) CRB	Undisclosed	24 March 2026	

=== Out ===
Pos.	Player	Transferred to	Fee	Date	Source
MF	(Brazil) Iago Teles	(Japan) Júbilo Iwata	Loan	9 July 2026	
FW	(Brazil) Bruno Santos	(Brazil) Mirassol	Undisclosed	12 July 2026	
MF	(Brazil) André Luiz	(Vietnam) Thể Công–Viettel FC	Undisclosed	12 August 2026	
DF	(Brazil) Yago Lincoln	(Belgium) Cercle Brugge	€500,000	2 September 2026	

== Competitions ==
=== Campeonato Brasileiro Série B ===
Pos	Team	Pld	W	D	L	GF	GA	GD	Pts	Promotion or relegation
16	Ceará	38	11	11	16	39	48	−9	44	
17	Avaí (R)	38	12	7	19	37	47	−10	43	Relegation to 2027 Campeonato Brasileiro Série C
18	Londrina (R)	38	9	8	21	47	59	−12	35	Relegation to 2027 Campeonato Brasileiro Série C
19	América Mineiro (R)	38	8	5	25	27	57	−30	29	Relegation to 2027 Campeonato Brasileiro Série C
20	Ponte Preta (R)	38	3	6	29	21	81	−60	15	Relegation to 2027 Campeonato Brasileiro Série C

Source: CBF
Rules for classification: 1) points; 2) wins; 3) goal difference; 4) goals scored; 5) head-to-head results (only between 2 teams); 6) fewest red cards; 7) fewest yellow cards; 8) drawing of lots.
(R) Relegated

Round	1	2	3	4	5	6	7	8	9	10	11	12	13	14	15	16	17	18	19	20	21	22	23	24	25	26	27	28	29	30	31	32	33	34	35	36	37	38
Ground	A	H	H	A	H	A	A	H	A	A	H	A	H	H	A	H	A	H	A	H	A	A	H	A	H	H	A	H	H	A	H	A	A	H	A	H	A	H
Result	W	D	L	L	D	L	L	L	W	L	L	L	W	W	D	W	D	D	L	L	L	L	D	L	D	L	W	W	L	L	L	L	D	W	L	L	L	W
Position	2	4	10	13	16	18	19	19	18	18	18	18	17	17	17	16	16	16	16	17	17	18	18	18	18	18	18	18	18	18	18	18	18	18	18	18	18	18

A = Away; H = Home; W = Win; D = Draw; L = Loss

==== Matches ====
22 March 2026 1	Novorizontino	1–3	Londrina
20:00

1 April 2026 2	Londrina	2–2	Goiás
19:00

4 April 2026 3	Londrina	1–2	Sport
20:30

12 April 2026 4	Atlético Goianiense	2–1	Londrina
20:30

19 April 2026 5	Londrina	0–0	Ceará
16:00

25 April 2026 6	Juventude	1–0	Londrina
21:00

3 May 2026 7	Operário Ferroviário	3–0	Londrina
16:00

12 May 2026 8	Londrina	1–3	São Bernardo
19:30

18 May 2026 9	Ponte Preta	1–4	Londrina
19:00

23 May 2026 10	Fortaleza	3–0	Londrina
18:30

31 May 2026 11	Londrina	0–1	Vila Nova
11:00

6 June 2026 12	Criciúma	1–0	Londrina
11:00 UTC−3

15 June 2026 13	Londrina	3–2	Avaí
21:00 UTC−3

20 June 2026 14	Londrina	2–0	Athletic
11:00

25 June 2026 15	Cuiabá	2–2	Londrina
20:30

4 July 2026 16	Londrina	5–0	CRB
16:00

13 July 2026 17	América Mineiro	1–1	Londrina
19:00

17 July 2026 18	Londrina	0–0	Botafogo-SP
21:00

22 July 2026 19	Náutico	2–1	Londrina
21:30

26 July 2026 20	Londrina	1–4	Novorizontino
21:00

10 August 2026 21	Goiás	1–0	Londrina
19:30

14 August 2026 22	Sport	2–1	Londrina
20:30

18 August 2026 23	Londrina	0–0	Atlético Goianiense
19:30

22 August 2026 24	Ceará	2–1	Londrina
18:00

1 September 2026 25	Londrina	0–0	Juventude
19:30

6 September 2026 26	Londrina	1–2	Operário Ferroviário
11:00

10 September 2026 27	São Bernardo	1–2	Londrina
20:50

15 September 2026 28	Londrina	6–0	Ponte Preta
19:30

20 September 2026 29	Londrina	1–2	Fortaleza
18:30

25 September 2026 30	Vila Nova	2–0	Londrina
20:30

2 October 2026 31	Londrina	0–2	Criciúma
20:30

7 October 2026 32	Avaí	2–1	Londrina
19:30

13 October 2026 33	Athletic	2–2	Londrina
19:30

20 October 2026 34	Londrina	1–0	Cuiabá
19:30

24 October 2026 35	CRB	2–1	Londrina
18:30

1 November 2026 36	Londrina	1–3	América Mineiro
16:00

5 November 2026 37	Botafogo-SP	4–0	Londrina
19:30

11 November 2026 38	Londrina	2–1	Náutico
19:00
