= 2026 Vila Nova Futebol Clube season =

Vila Nova
2026 season
- Manager: Umberto Louzer (until 18 March); Guto Ferreira (from 27 March)
- Stadium: Estádio Onésio Brasileiro Alvarenga
- Campeonato Brasileiro Série B: 4th
- Campeonato Goiano: Semi-finals
- Copa do Brasil: Fourth round
- Copa Verde: Quarter-finals
- Top goalscorer: League: Rafael Silva; Ryan Lima (3 each); All: Dellatorre (10)

In its 83rd season, Vila Nova Futebol Clube plays its sixth consecutive season in the Campeonato Brasileiro Série B, alongside its participation in the Campeonato Goiano, Copa do Brasil, and Copa Verde.

== Transfers ==
=== In ===
Pos.	Player	Transferred from	Fee	Date	Source
MF	(Brazil) Ryan Lima	(Brazil) Maranhão		26 December 2025	
MF	(Brazil) Janderson	(Brazil) Ceará		1 January 2026	
MF	(Brazil) Marquinhos Gabriel	(Brazil) Avaí		1 January 2026	
MF	(Brazil) Willian Maranhão	(Vietnam) Hanoi FC		1 January 2026	
DF	(Brazil) Pedro Romano	(Brazil) Capital		1 January 2026	
FW	(Brazil) Rafael Silva	(Brazil) Mirassol		1 January 2026	
GK	(Brazil) Helton Leite	(Brazil) Fortaleza		4 March 2026	
DF	(Brazil) Caio Marcelo			13 March 2026	

== Competitions ==
=== Campeonato Brasileiro Série B ===
Pos	Team	Pld	W	D	L	GF	GA	GD	Pts	Promotion or relegation
1	Juventude	32	17	8	7	37	19	+18	59	Promotion to 2027 Campeonato Brasileiro Série A
2	Vila Nova	32	17	7	8	44	31	+13	58	Promotion to 2027 Campeonato Brasileiro Série A
3	Novorizontino	32	16	9	7	54	27	+27	57	Advance to the promotion play-offs
4	Fortaleza	32	15	11	6	37	27	+10	56	Advance to the promotion play-offs
5	Criciúma	32	15	8	9	33	28	+5	53	Advance to the promotion play-offs

Updated to match(es) played on 8 October 2026. Source: CBF
Rules for classification: 1) points; 2) wins; 3) goal difference; 4) goals scored; 5) head-to-head results (only between 2 teams); 6) fewest red cards; 7) fewest yellow cards; 8) drawing of lots.

==== Results summary ====
Overall								Home						Away					
Pld	W	D	L	GF	GA	GD	Pts	W	D	L	GF	GA	GD	W	D	L	GF	GA	GD
10	5	4	1	16	11	+5	19	3	2	0	9	5	+4	2	2	1	7	6	+1

Last updated: 24 May 2026.

==== Results by round ====
Round	1	2	3	4	5	6	7	8	9
Ground	H	A	H	A	H	A	A	H	A
Result	D	D	W	W	W	D	L	W	W
Position	-	-	-	-	-	4			

Updated to match(es) played on 24 May 2026. Source:
A = Away; H = Home; W = Win; D = Draw; L = Loss

==== Matches ====
The match schedule was issued on 6 February 2026.

21 March 2026 1	Vila Nova	2–2	CRB	Goiânia
17:00 UTC−3				Stadium: Estádio Onésio Brasileiro Alvarenga

1 April 2026 2	Sport	1–1	Vila Nova	Recife
19:00 UTC−3				Stadium: Estádio Ilha do Retiro

4 April 2026 3	Vila Nova	2–1	Atlético Goianiense	Goiânia
20:00 UTC−3	Marquinhos Gabriel 65' (pen.); Gustavo Puskas 88'		Marrony 33'	Stadium: Estádio Onésio Brasileiro Alvarenga

11 April 2026 4	Ponte Preta	0–1	Vila Nova	Campinas
18:00 UTC−3			Ryan Lima 38'	Stadium: Estádio Moisés Lucarelli

18 April 2026 5	Vila Nova	2–1	Operário Ferroviário	Goiânia
18:30 UTC−3	Rafael Silva 19'; Ryan Lima 50'		Vinícius Diniz 43'	Stadium: Estádio Onésio Brasileiro Alvarenga

26 April 2026 6	Ceará	3–3	Vila Nova	Fortaleza
18:00	Lucas Lima 15'; Matheus Araújo 44', 45+3'		Rafael Silva 13', 67'; João Vieira 63' (pen.)	Stadium: Castelão; Referee: Yuri Elino Ferreira da Cruz

4 May 2026 7	Vila Nova	1–1	Athletic	Goiânia
19:00	Hayner (yellow card) 45+1'; Dellatorre 70'; Janderson (yellow card) 80'		Douglas (yellow card) 23'; Ian Luccas (red card) 53'; F. Vieira (yellow card) 79'; Bruninho 87', (yellow card) 88'	Stadium: Estádio Onésio Brasileiro Alvarenga; Referee: Marcelo de Lima Henrique

9 May 2026 8	Goiás	1–0	Vila Nova	Goiânia
16:00	Anselmo Ramon 79'			Stadium: Estádio da Serrinha; Referee: Flávio Rodrigues de Souza

17 May 2026 9	Vila Nova	2–0	Avaí	Goiânia
18:00	Bruno Xavier 33'; Dudu 45+1'; Maranhão (yellow card) 57'; Anderson (yellow card) 80'; Pedro Romano (yellow card) 82'; Elias (yellow card) 90+2'		Daniel Penha (yellow card) 43'; Douglas Teixeira (yellow card) 45'; Guilherme Vargas (yellow card) 90+3'	Stadium: Estádio Onésio Brasileiro Alvarenga; Referee: André Luiz Skettino Policarpo Bento

24 May 2026 10	América Mineiro	1–2	Vila Nova	Belo Horizonte
18:30	Nathan 22', (yellow card) 35'; Val (yellow card) 58'; Léo Alaba (yellow card) 90+2'		Anderson (yellow card) 66'; Ryan Lima 67'; Janderson 76'; André Luis (yellow card) 90+2'; Elias (yellow card) 90+3'	Stadium: Arena Independência; Referee: Matheus Delgado Candançan

31 May 2026 11	Londrina	0–1	Vila Nova	Londrina
11:00	Lucas Marques (yellow card) 6'; Iago Teles (yellow card) 12' (red card) 17'; Paulinho Moccelin (yellow card) 39'; André Dhominique (yellow card) 63' (yellow-red card) 68'; Fabiano Henrique (yellow card) 81'	Report	Gustavo Puskas (yellow card) 5'; Willian Maranhão (yellow card) 12'; Pedro Romano (yellow card) 45+1' (yellow-red card) 62'; Dudu (yellow card) 59'; André Luis 65'; Caio Marcelo (yellow card) 88'	Stadium: Estádio do Café; Attendance: 3,306; Referee: (Brazil) Bruno Pereira

8 June 2026 12	Vila Nova	1–0	Botafogo-SP	Goiânia
20:00	André Luis 21' (yellow card) 48'	Report	Patrick Brey (yellow card) 32'; Felipe Vieira Augusto (yellow card) 90'; Thiago Henrique Moraes (yellow card) 90+8'; Wallace (yellow card) 90+13'	Stadium: Estádio Onésio Brasileiro Alvarenga; Attendance: 7,572; Referee: (Brazil) Maguielson Lima Barbosa

14 June 2026 13	Cuiabá	1–0	Vila Nova	Cuiabá
17:00	Calebe 90+2'; Marcos Júnior (yellow card) 90+8'	Report	João Vieira (yellow card) 84'	Stadium: Arena Pantanal; Attendance: 1,735; Referee: (Brazil) Denis da Silva Ribeiro Serafim

=== Campeonato Goiano ===
==== Results by round ====
Round	1	2	3	4	5	6	7	8
Ground	A	H	A	H	H	A	A	H
Result	W	W	W	W	L	W	L	W
Position								

A = Away; H = Home; W = Win; D = Draw; L = Loss

10 January 2026 1	ABECAT	1–2	Vila Nova
16:00 UTC−3

14 January 2026 2	Vila Nova	3–2	Anapolina
20:40 UTC−3

17 January 2026 3	Anápolis	1–3	Vila Nova
16:00 UTC−3

22 January 2026 4	Vila Nova	3–0	Aparecidense
20:40 UTC−3

25 January 2026 5	Vila Nova	1–2	Atlético Goianiense
17:00 UTC−3

29 January 2026 6	Centro Oeste	0–2	Vila Nova
15:30 UTC−3

1 February 2026 7	Goiás	1–0	Vila Nova
18:30 UTC−3

8 February 2026 8	Vila Nova	4–1	Jataiense
16:00 UTC−3

==== Quarter-finals ====
12 February 2026 First leg	Anápolis	0–2	Vila Nova
21:00 UTC−3

16 February 2026 First leg	Vila Nova	2–2 (4–2 agg.)	Anápolis
19:30 UTC−3

==== Semi-finals ====
22 February 2026 First leg	Atlético Goianiense	2–0	Vila Nova
17:00 UTC−3

1 March 2026 Second leg	Vila Nova	0–0 (0–2 agg.)	Atlético Goianiense
17:00 UTC−3

=== Copa do Brasil ===
4 March 2026 Second round	Velo Clube	0–0 (2–3 p)	Vila Nova
19:00 UTC−3

12 March 2026 Third round	Vila Nova	1–1 (5–4 p)	Operário-MS
19:00 UTC−3

18 March 2026 Fourth round	Vila Nova	0–0 (3–5 p)	Confiança
19:00 UTC−3

=== Copa Verde ===
24 March 2026 1	Rio Branco	1–0	Vila Nova
19:00 UTC−3

28 March 2026 2	Vila Nova	6–0	Operário-MS	Goiânia
20:30 UTC−3				Stadium: Estádio Onésio Brasileiro Alvarenga

8 April 2026 3	Primavera	2–2	Vila Nova	Primavera do Leste
19:00 UTC−3				Stadium: Estádio Antônio Santo Renosto

15 April 2026 4	Vila Nova	0–0	Capital	Goiânia
21:30 UTC−3				Stadium: Estádio Onésio Brasileiro Alvarenga

29 April 2026 5	Araguaína	1–2	Vila Nova	Araguaína
19:00 UTC−3				Stadium: Estádio Mirandão; Referee: Djonaltan Costa de Araújo

==== Knockout stage ====
13 May 2026 Quarter-finals	Vila Nova	1–1 (3–4 p)	Anápolis	Goiânia
19:00				Stadium: Estádio Onésio Brasileiro Alvarenga; Referee: Dewson Fernando Freitas

== Statistics ==
=== Goalscorers ===
Rank.	Pos.	Player	Série B	Campeonato Goiano	Copa do Brasil	Copa Verde	Total
1	FW	(Brazil) Dellatorre	2	7	1	0	10
2	MF	(Brazil) João Vieira	1	5	0	1	7
3	FW	(Brazil) Rafael Silva	3	2	0	0	5
4	MF	(Brazil) Emerson Urso	0	2	0	1	3
4	MF	(Brazil) Enzo	0	1	0	2	3
4	MF	(Brazil) Janderson	2	1	0	0	3
4	FW	(Brazil) Ryan Lima	3	0	0	0	3
8	MF	(Brazil) Dudu	2	0	0	0	2
8	DF	(Brazil) Willian Formiga	0	2	0	0	2
8	MF	(Brazil) Marquinhos Gabriel	1	1	0	0	2
8	FW	(Brazil) Gustavo Puskas	1	0	0	1	2
12	FW	(Brazil) André Luis	0	1	0	0	1
12	DF	(Brazil) Elias	0	0	0	1	1
12	MF	(Brazil) Dodô	0	0	0	1	1
12	FW	(Brazil) Jackson Filho	0	0	0	1	1
12	FW	(Brazil) Ruan Ribeiro	0	0	0	1	1
12	MF	(Brazil) Bruno Xavier	1	0	0	0	1
