= Ageu =

Brazilian footballer (born 1972)

Personal information
- Full name: Ageu Gonçalves de Siqueira
- Date of birth: 6 April 1972 (age 54)
- Place of birth: Curitiba, Brazil
- Height: 1.79 m (5 ft 10 in)
- Position: Centre-back

Team information
- Current team: São Joseense (head coach)

Senior career*
Years	Team	Apps	(Gls)
1993–1994	Iraty		
1994–2001	Paraná		
1999	→ Coritiba (loan)		
2002	Portuguesa		
2003–2004	Paraná		
2004	Criciúma		
2004–2005	Juventude		
2005–2006	Iraty		
2006	Operário Ferroviário		
2006	Cianorte		
2007	15 de Novembro		

Managerial career
- 2008–2011: Paraná (assistant)
- 2009: Paraná (interim)
- 2011: Paraná (interim)
- 2011: Paraná (interim)
- 2012: Grecal
- 2013–2014: Cruzeiro (assistant)
- 2015: Palmeiras (assistant)
- 2017–2018: São Joseense
- 2020: Cascavel CR
- 2020: São Joseense
- 2021: Paraná (assistant)
- 2022: Águia Negra
- 2022: Araucária
- 2023: Vitória da Conquista U20
- 2023: AA Iguaçu
- 2023: Batel
- 2024: São Joseense
- 2024: Patriotas U20
- 2025: São Joseense
- 2025: Araucária
- 2026–: São Joseense
- * Club domestic league appearances and goals

Ageu Gonçalves de Siqueira (born 6 April 1972), simply known as Ageu, is a Brazilian football coach and former player who played as a centre-back. He is the current head coach of São Joseense.

== Playing career ==
Ageu made history at Paraná Clube, a team where he has made more than 350 appearances. He also played for some other teams, but without being able to establish himself.

== Managerial career ==
Ageu began his career as a permanent assistant at Paraná Clube, then worked with Marcelo Oliveira at Cruzeiro and Palmeiras. He managed some other teams in the state of Paraná.

== Honours ==
Paraná

- Copa João Havelange Group Yellow: 2000
- Campeonato Paranaense: 1995, 1996, 1997

Iraty

- Campeonato Paranaense Série Prata: 1993
