= Eduardo dos Santos =

Eduardo dos Santos may refer to:

- José Eduardo dos Santos (born 1942), former President of Angola
- Eduardo dos Santos, nicknamed Dudu (born 2001), Brazilian football midfielder
- Eduardo dos Santos (footballer, born 1980), Brazilian football striker
- Eduardo dos Santos (footballer, born 1983), Argentine football forward
- Eduardo dos Santos Haesler (born 1999), German football goalkeeper
