= Bruninho (footballer, born 2008) =

Brazilian footballer (born 2008)

Personal information
- Full name: Bruno Braga Ramos
- Date of birth: 16 August 2008 (age 18)
- Place of birth: São Paulo, Brazil
- Height: 1.75 m (5 ft 9 in)
- Position: Winger

Team information
- Current team: Shakhtar Donetsk
- Number: 99

Youth career
- 2021–2026: Athletico Paranaense

Senior career*
Years	Team	Apps	(Gls)
2026	Athletico Paranaense	19	(4)
2026–	Shakhtar Donetsk	3	(0)

International career^{‡}
2026–	Brazil U20	7	(6)
- * Club domestic league appearances and goals as of 18:30, 30 October 2026 (UTC) ‡ National team caps and goals as of 22:18, 3 October 2026 (UTC)

Bruno Braga Ramos (born 16 August 2008), commonly known as Bruninho, is a Brazilian footballer who plays for Shakhtar Donetsk. Mainly a right winger, he can also play as an attacking midfielder.

== Club career ==
=== Athletico Paranaense ===
Born in São Paulo, Bruninho was an Athletico Paranaense youth graduate, having joined the side in 2021. After progressing through the youth setup, he renewed his contract until 2028 on 24 September 2025.

Promoted to the first team to play in the 2026 Campeonato Paranaense, Bruninho made his senior debut on 8 January of that year, starting and scoring Athletico's second in a 2–1 away win over Andraus.

On 26 January 2026, Athletico increased Bruninho's wages, but still kept his deal until March 2028. He made his Série A debut on 12 February, coming on as a late substitute for Stiven Mendoza in a 2–1 home win over Santos.

=== Shakhtar Donetsk ===
On 18 April 2026, Ukrainian side Shakhtar Donetsk announced the signing of Bruninho on a three-year contract, for a rumoured fee of € 14 million. He will join the club in August, after his 18th birthday.

== Career statistics ==
As of 30 October 2026

Club	Season	League			State League		Cup		Continental		Other		Total	
Club	Season	Division	Apps	Goals	Apps	Goals	Apps	Goals	Apps	Goals	Apps	Goals	Apps	Goals
Athletico Paranaense	2026	Série A	9	0	10	4	1	0	—		0	0	20	4
Shakhtar Donetsk	2026–27	Ukrainian Premier League	3	0	—		1	0	1 (Note: Appearances in UEFA Champions League)	0	—		5	0
Career total			12	0	10	4	2	0	1	0	0	0	25	4
