= Netinho (footballer, born 1968) =

Brazilian footballer

Personal information
- Full name: Erwin Walter Aal Neto
- Date of birth: 11 September 1968 (age 58)
- Place of birth: Curitiba, Brazil
- Position: Right back

Youth career
- Coritiba

Senior career*
Years	Team	Apps	(Gls)
1985–1987	Coritiba		
1988	Avaí		
1988–1989	São Paulo	27	(0)
1990–1992	Atlético Mineiro		
1992–1993	Avaí		
1995–1996	Rio Branco-PR		
1996	Avaí		
1997	Rio Branco-PR		

International career
1985	Brazil U17		

Managerial career
- 2007: AA Iguaçu
- 2008: Rio Branco-PR
- 2009: Sinop
- * Club domestic league appearances and goals as of 22 November 2023

Erwin Walter Aal Neto (born 11 September 1968), better known as Netinho, is a Brazilian former professional footballer who played as a right back.

== Career ==
Formed in the youth categories of Curitiba, Netinho also had spells at Avaí, São Paulo, Atlético Mineiro and Rio Branco-PR.

He represented Brazil in the 1985 FIFA U-16 World Championship.

After retiring Netinho had some experiences as a head coach, but currently works as a youth coordinator at Londrina EC.

== Personal life ==
Netinho is son of the also footballer Vivi, and brother of Allan Aal, former footballer and currently manager.

== Honours ==
Coritiba

- Campeonato Paranaense: 1986

Avaí

- Campeonato Catarinense: 1988

São Paulo

- Campeonato Paulista: 1989

Atlético Mineiro

- Campeonato Mineiro: 1991
