= 2025 Campeonato Paranaense =

Football competition in Brazil

Campeonato Paranaense
- Season: 2025
- Dates: 11 January - 8 April
- Champions: Operário Ferroviário (2nd title)

The 2025 Campeonato Paranaense is the 111th edition of the top division of football in the state of Paraná organized by FPF. The competition began on 11 January and is scheduled to conclude on 8 April 2025. Athletico Paranaense were the defending champions.

== Format ==
In the first stage, each team played the other eleven teams in a single round-robin tournament. The teams were ranked according to points. If tied on points, the following criteria would be used to determine the ranking: 1. Wins; 2. Goal difference; 3. Goals scored; 4. Head-to-head results (only between two teams); 5. Fewest red cards; 6. Fewest yellow cards; 7. Draw in the headquarters of the FPF.

Top eight teams advance to the quarter-finals of the final stages. The bottom two teams are relegated to the Campeonato Paranaense Série Prata. Top three teams not already qualified for 2026 Série A, Série B or Série C will qualified for 2024 Série D.

Final stage will be played on a home-and-away two-legged basis, with the best overall performance team hosting the second leg. If tied on aggregate, the penalty shoot-out will be used to determine the winners. Top four teams will qualify for the 2026 Copa do Brasil.

== Participating teams ==
Club	Home city	Manager	2024 result	Titles (last)
Andraus	Campo Largo		9th	0
Athletico Paranaense	Curitiba	Maurício Barbieri	1st	28 (2024)
Azuriz	Marmeleiro	Gilson Kleina	5th	0
Cascavel	Cascavel		6th	0
Cianorte	Cianorte	Bolívar	7th	0
Coritiba	Curitiba	Mozart	2nd	39 (2022)
Independente São Joseense	São José dos Pinhais	Marcão	10th	0
Londrina	Londrina	Eduardo Souza	8th	5 (2021)
Maringá	Maringá	Jorge Castilho	3rd	0
Operário Ferroviário	Rafael Guanaes	Rafael Guanaes	4th	1 (2015)
Paraná	Curitiba	Marcão	1st (Seg.)	7 (2006)
Rio Branco	Paranaguá	Tcheco	2nd (Seg.)	0

== First stage ==
Pos	Team	Pld	W	D	L	GF	GA	GD	Pts	Qualification or relegation
1	Operário Ferroviário	11	6	4	1	18	7	+11	22	Advance to Final stage
2	Athletico Paranaense	11	6	4	1	19	9	+10	22	Advance to Final stage
3	Coritiba	11	6	2	3	19	8	+11	20	Advance to Final stage
4	Londrina	11	6	2	3	16	10	+6	20	Advance to Final stage
5	Cianorte	11	5	2	4	18	13	+5	17	Advance to Final stage
6	Maringá	11	5	1	5	18	15	+3	16	Advance to Final stage
7	Azuriz	11	5	0	6	8	13	−5	15	Advance to Final stage
8	Independente Futebol São Joseense	11	4	1	6	13	21	−8	13	Advance to Final stage
9	Cascavel	11	3	4	4	7	10	−3	13	
10	Andraus	11	3	1	7	9	19	−10	10	
11	Rio Branco	11	3	1	7	11	22	−11	10	Relegation to 2026 Campeonato Paranaense Série Prata
12	Paraná	11	1	4	6	4	13	−9	7	Relegation to 2026 Campeonato Paranaense Série Prata

Source: FPF

== Final stage ==
=== Bracket ===
Quarter-finals
6	Maringá	2	1	3
3	Coritiba	0	1	1
7	Azuriz	0	0	0
2	Athletico Paranaense	0	3	3
8	Independente FSJ	1	1	2(5)
1	Operário PR	1	1	2(6)
5	Cianorte	0	0	0
4	Londrina	2	2	4

Semi-finals
Maringá	1	3	4
Athletico Paranaense	1	0	1
Operário PR	0	2	2 (4)
Londrina	1	1	2 (1)

Finals
Maringá	2	1	3 (4)
Operário PR	2	1	3 (5)

=== Quarter-finals ===
Team 1	Agg.	Team 2	1st leg	2nd leg
Independente FSJ	2–2 (5–6 p)	Operário PR	1–1	1–1
Azuriz	0–3	Athletico Paranaense	0–0	0–3
Maringá	3–1	Coritiba	2–0	1–1
Cianorte	0–4	Londrina	0–2	0–2

22 February 2025
15:30

Independente FSJ	1–1	Operário PR
João Maranhão 36'		Jacy 56'

Estádio do Pinhão, São José dos Pinhais
Referee: Lucas Paulo Torezin
9 March 2025
16:00

Operário PR	1–1	Independente FSJ
Gabriel Feliciano 53'		Miguel Bianconi 65' (pen.)
Penalties
	6–5

Estádio Germano Krüger, Ponta Grossa

21 February 2025
20:00

Azuriz	0–0	Athletico Paranaense

Os Pioneiros, Pato Branco
Referee: Robson Babinski
8 March 2025
16:00

Athletico Paranaense	3–0	Azuriz
Lucas Adell 15' (o.g.); Luiz Fernando 58', 64'

Arena da Baixada, Curitiba

22 February 2025
16:00

Maringá	2–0	Coritiba
Miller 47', 84'

Estádio Willie Davids, Maringá
Referee: Rodolpho Toski Marques
9 March 2025
18:30

Coritiba	1–1	Maringá
Gustavo Coutinho 12'		Maranhão 72'

Estádio Couto Pereira, Curitiba

23 February 2025
16:00

Cianorte	0–2	Londrina
		Kaique 72'; Iago Teles 90+14' (pen.)

Estádio Olimpico Albino Turbay, Cianorte
Referee: Paulo Roberto Alves Júnior
1 March 2025
16:00

Londrina	2–0	Cianorte
Pablo Ruan 35', 49'

Estádio do Café, Londrina
Referee: Robson Babinski
