= Allan Aal =

Brazilian footballer (born 1979)

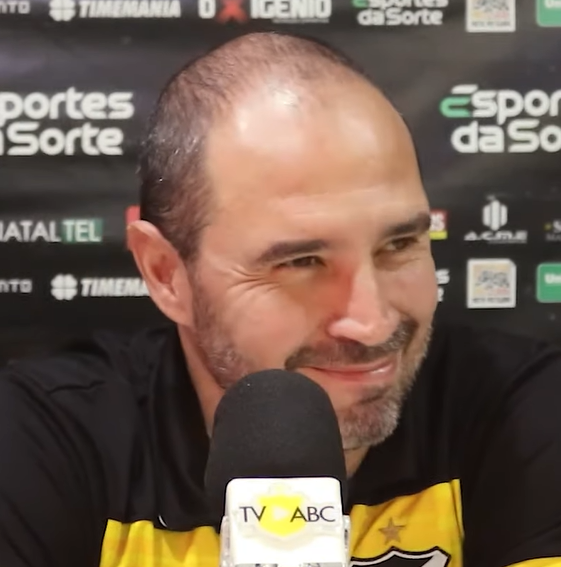
- Allan Aal in 2023

Personal information
- Full name: Allan Rodrigo Aal
- Date of birth: 17 March 1979 (age 47)
- Place of birth: Paranaguá, Brazil
- Height: 1.85 m (6 ft 1 in)
- Position: Centre-back

Youth career
- 1989–1999: Coritiba

Senior career*
Years	Team	Apps	(Gls)
2000–2002	Coritiba	51	(2)
2002–2003	Botafogo	14	(0)
2004	Daejeon Citizen	4	(0)
2004–2005	Coritiba	9	(0)
2006	Triestina	0	(0)
2006	Londrina	0	(0)
2007	Rio Branco-PR	17	(0)
2007	PAOK	0	(0)
2008	Rio Branco-PR	5	(0)
2009	Sinop	0	(0)

Managerial career
- 2011: Rio Branco-PR U18
- 2012: Rio Branco-PR (assistant)
- 2012–2015: Coritiba U17
- 2016: Rio Branco-PR
- 2017–2018: Foz do Iguaçu
- 2018: Portuguesa
- 2019: Nacional-SP
- 2019: Cascavel
- 2019: Paraná (assistant)
- 2020: Paraná
- 2020–2021: Cuiabá
- 2021: Guarani
- 2021–2022: CRB
- 2022: Novorizontino
- 2022: Vila Nova
- 2023: ABC
- 2024: Náutico
- 2024: Guarani
- 2025: Noroeste
- 2025: Botafogo-SP
- 2026: Londrina
- 2026: Avaí
- * Club domestic league appearances and goals

Allan Rodrigo Aal (born 17 March 1979), known as Allan Aal, is a Brazilian football manager and former player who played as a centre-back.

== Playing career ==
Born in Paranaguá, Paraná, Aal was known as just Allan as a player, and joined Coritiba's youth setup at the age of ten. He made his first team debut in 2000, aged 19, before moving to Botafogo in August 2002.

After representing Daejeon Citizen in South Korea, Allan returned to Coritiba in September 2004. He moved abroad again in 2006, with Italian side Triestina, but returned to Brazil in September of that year after signing for Londrina.

Allan moved to his hometown side Rio Branco-PR for the 2007 Campeonato Paranaense. After being a regular starter, he moved to PAOK in June 2007, but terminated his contract six months later due to the club's financial problems, and returned to his former club Rio Branco.

In 2009, after playing for Sinop, Allan retired at the age of just 30.

== Managerial career ==
After retiring, Aal started working with his former side Rio Branco, before being named manager of Coritiba's under-17 team on 22 May 2012. On 1 October 2015, he returned to Rio Branco, now as the first-team manager.

On 15 February 2016, after four defeats in the first four matches of the campaign, Aal was sacked. He took over Foz do Iguaçu for the 2017 season, and left the club on 15 February 2018 to manage Portuguesa.

Dismissed by Lusa on 6 November 2018, Aal managed Nacional-SP for a short period before being appointed at the helm of Cascavel, a club he was already linked with during the pre-season but had left to take over Nacional.

Still in 2019, after leaving Cascavel, Aal moved to Paraná as an assistant manager, but was named manager ahead of the 2020 season. He was relieved of his duties on 1 November 2020, and took over fellow Série B side Cuiabá fifteen days later.

Despite leading Cuiabá to a first-ever promotion, Aal left the club by mutual agreement on 1 February 2021. He took over Guarani in the second division three days later, but was sacked on 18 May.

Aal was announced as CRB manager on 24 May 2021. He was dismissed the following 10 February, after a poor start to the new campaign, and took over fellow second division side Novorizontino two days later.

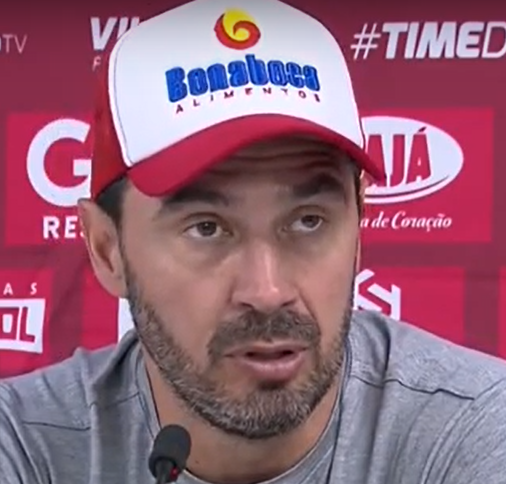
Aal as head coach of Vila Nova in 2022

On 19 June 2022, after suffering relegation in the 2022 Campeonato Paulista and a six-match winless run, Aal was sacked by Novorizontino. On 2 July, he replaced Dado Cavalcanti at the helm of fellow second division side Vila Nova.

On 23 November 2022, despite saving Vila Nova from relegation, Aal was sacked by the club. The following 18 May, he was named in charge of ABC also in the second division.

On 2 September 2023, Aal left ABC, with the club in the last position of the 2023 Série B. He was appointed in charge of Náutico for the 2024 season on 15 November, but was dismissed on 30 March 2024, despite reaching the finals of the Campeonato Pernambucano.

On 29 July 2024, Aal was announced back at Guarani in the second division. He left by mutual consent on 25 November, after suffering relegation.

On 4 February 2025, Aal replaced sacked Paulo Comelli at the helm of Noroeste. After managing to avoid relegation, he was appointed in charge of second division Botafogo-SP on 19 May.

On 4 October 2025, Aal was sacked by Botafogo after a run of six winless matches. On 30 December, he was named head coach of Londrina also in division two.

Aal led the side to the 2026 Campeonato Paranaense finals, losing on penalties to Operário Ferroviário, and was sacked on 4 May of that year, after a poor start in the 2026 Série B. On 9 July of that year, he was appointed in charge of Avaí of the same division, but was dismissed on 27 September.

== Personal life ==
Aal comes from a family of footballers. His grandfather, his father Vivi and his brother Netinho were also footballers and defenders.
