= Matheus Gonçalves (disambiguation) =

Matheus Gonçalves is a Brazilian footballer who plays as a midfielder for Flamengo.

The name may also refer to:

- Matheus Trindade - a Brazilian footballer, whose full name is Matheus Trindade Gonçalves.
- Matheus Sávio - a Brazilian footballer, whose full name is Matheus Gonçalves Savio.
