= Matheus Lu =

Brazilian footballer

Personal information
- Full name: Matheus Augusto Pinheiro Lu
- Date of birth: 15 December 1997 (age 28)
- Place of birth: Americana, Brazil
- Height: 1.76 m (5 ft 9 in)
- Position: Forward

Youth career
- 2011–2015: Guarani
- 2015–2017: São Paulo

Senior career*
Years	Team	Apps	(Gls)
2017	São Paulo	8	(0)
2018	Primavera	23	(5)
2019–2020	Nacional-SP	28	(3)
2020	→ Rio Claro (loan)	13	(0)
2020	Treze	1	(0)
2020	Rio Branco-SP	8	(1)
2021	EC São Bernardo	6	(0)
2021	São Joseense-PR	4	(0)
2022	Bandeirante	12	(1)
2022	Juventus-SP	4	(0)
2023	São Joseense-PR	0	(0)
2024	União São João	6	(0)
2024	São Caetano	7	(1)
2025–	União São João		
- * Club domestic league appearances and goals as of 16 January 2025

Matheus Augusto Pinheiro Lu (born 15 December 1997), simply known as Matheus Lu, is a Brazilian professional footballer who plays as a forward.

== Career ==
Matheus Lu played at youth level for Guarani and São Paulo. In 2017 he was part of the São Paulo B team that competed in the Copa Paulista. Afterwards, he had stints at Primavera, Rio Claro, Nacional, Treze Rio Branco, and EC São Bernardo. For the 2025 season, Matheus Lu signed with União São João.

== Honours ==
Independente São Joseense

- Campeonato Paranaense Série Prata: 2021
