= Dudu (footballer, born 2001) =

Brazilian footballer

Personal information
- Full name: Eduardo dos Santos
- Date of birth: 3 December 2001 (age 24)
- Place of birth: Viçosa do Ceará, Brazil
- Height: 1.84 m (6 ft 0 in)
- Position: Midfielder

Team information
- Current team: Vila Nova
- Number: 15

Youth career
- Floresta

Senior career*
Years	Team	Apps	(Gls)
2020–2024	Floresta	45	(1)
2024	Iguatu	14	(0)
2024–2025	Tirol	3	(1)
2025	Maranhão	31	(2)
2026	Anapolina	12	(0)
2026	→ Vila Nova (loan)	22	(4)
2026–	Vila Nova	10	(1)
- * Club domestic league appearances and goals as of 21:16, 8 November 2026 (UTC)

Eduardo dos Santos (born 3 December 2001), commonly known as Dudu, is a Brazilian professional footballer who plays as a midfielder for Vila Nova.

== Career ==
Born in Viçosa do Ceará, Ceará, Dudu began his career with local side Floresta, making his first team debut in 2020. He never established himself as an undisputed starter in the following years, and moved to Iguatu in May 2024.

In February 2025, after a period at Tirol, Dudu was announced at Maranhão. He helped the latter side to achieve promotion from the Série D in that year, before joining Anapolina on 7 October.

An undisputed starter at Xata, Dudu was loaned to Série B side Vila Nova on 4 March 2026, until the end of the year. On 25 August, after establishing himself as a first-choice, he signed a permanent contract until November 2029.

== Career statistics ==
As of 8 November 2026

Appearances and goals by club, season and competition
Club	Season	League			State league		Cup		Continental		Other		Total	
Club	Season	Division	Apps	Goals	Apps	Goals	Apps	Goals	Apps	Goals	Apps	Goals	Apps	Goals
Floresta	2020	Série D	4	0	—		—		—		4 (Note: Appearance(s) in Taça Fares Lopes)	0	8	0
Floresta	2021	Série C	0	0	5	0	—		—		7 (Note: Four appearances in Copa do Nordeste, three appearances in Taça Fares Lopes)	0	12	0
Floresta	2022	Série C	8	0	—		—		—		12 (Note: Eight appearances in Copa do Nordeste, eight appearances in Taça Fares Lopes)	0	20	0
Floresta	2023	Série C	10	0	13	1	—		—		—		23	1
Floresta	2024	Série C	—		5	0	—		—		—		5	0
Floresta	Total		22	0	23	1	—		—		23	0	68	1
Iguatu	2024	Série D	14	0	—		—		—		—		14	0
Tirol	2024	Cearense Série B	—		—		—		—		1	0	1	0
Tirol	2025	Cearense	—		3	1	—		—		—		3	1
Tirol	Total		—		3	1	—		—		1	0	4	1
Maranhão	2025	Série D	19	1	12	1	1	0	—		—		32	2
Anapolina	2026	Goiano	—		12	0	—		—		—		12	0
Vila Nova	2026	Série B	32	5	—		1	0	—		2 (Note: Appearance(s) in Copa Centro-Oeste)	0	35	5
Career total			87	6	50	3	2	0	0	0	26	0	165	9

== Honours ==
Maranhão

- Campeonato Maranhense: 2025
