= Chumbinho =

Chumbinho may refer to:

- Chumbinho (footballer, born 1986), Marinaldo Cícero da Silva, Brazilian former football attacking midfielder
- Chumbinho (surfer) (born 2000), João Vítor de Azeredo Chianca, Brazilian surfer
- Chumbinho (footballer, born 2003), Willian da Silva Santos, Brazilian football midfielder for Londrina
