= Geovane (footballer, born 1996) =

Brazilian footballer

Personal information
- Full name: Geovane Henrique Pereira de Souza
- Date of birth: 17 October 1996 (age 30)
- Place of birth: Curitiba, Brazil
- Height: 1.80 m (5 ft 11 in)
- Position: Right back

Team information
- Current team: ABC

Youth career
- –2016: Coritiba

Senior career*
Years	Team	Apps	(Gls)
2016–2020	Coritiba	10	(0)
2020	→ São Luiz (loan)	9	(0)
2021	Maringá	0	(0)
2022	Bandeirante	10	(0)
2023	Azuriz	5	(0)
2023	Paraná		
2023–	ABC	8	(0)
- * Club domestic league appearances and goals as of 14 November 2023

Geovane Henrique Pereira de Souza (born 17 October 1996), known as Geovane, is a Brazilian professional footballer who plays as a right back for ABC.
