= Elias (footballer, born 1995) =

Brazilian footballer

Personal information
- Full name: Elias Martello Curzel
- Date of birth: 12 July 1995 (age 31)
- Place of birth: Vacaria, Brazil
- Height: 1.86 m (6 ft 1 in)
- Position: Goalkeeper

Team information
- Current team: Operário Ferroviário
- Number: 1

Youth career
- Glória
- Juventude
- Nova Prata
- Juventude
- Glória
- Porto Alegre
- 2012–2015: Juventude

Senior career*
| Years | Team | Apps | (Gls) |
| 2014–2017 | Juventude | 48 | (0) |
| 2017 | → Chapecoense (loan) | 6 | (0) |
| 2018–2021 | Chapecoense | 2 | (0) |
| 2018–2019 | → Vitória (loan) | 8 | (0) |
| 2021 | → Azuriz (loan) | 0 | (0) |
| 2021 | → Paysandu (loan) | 1 | (0) |
| 2022 | Paysandu | 15 | (0) |
| 2023 | Botafogo-PB | 8 | (0) |
| 2023 | Sampaio Corrêa | 0 | (0) |
| 2024–2025 | Itabirito | 8 | (0) |
| 2024 | → América Mineiro (loan) | 22 | (0) |
| 2025 | → Operário Ferroviário (loan) | 50 | (0) |
| 2026– | Operário Ferroviário | 12 | (0) |
- * Club domestic league appearances and goals as of 18 November 2026

Elias Martello Curzel (born 12 July 1995), simply known as Elias, is a Brazilian professional footballer who plays as a goalkeeper for Operário Ferroviário.

== Club career ==
=== Juventude ===
He joined Juventude's professional team in 2015, starting as the third goalkeeper, but with the departure of the starting goalkeeper, Airton Moraes, he took over as the starter. His debut took place on June 27 against Madureira at Aniceto Moscoso stadium, with the final result being 4–3 for the Gaúcha team. He played 14 games, all in Serie C, with 7 wins, 4 draws, and 3 losses, conceding 19 goals and keeping 6 clean sheets.

In 2016, he was the absolute starter throughout the season and a key player in the team's good campaign in all competitions. He was a champion of the Longevity quadrangular tournament at the beginning of the year. In the Gauchão, he was one of the team's standouts as they finished runners-up against Internacional. In Serie C, Juventude finished 4th in the overall standings, securing promotion to Serie B in 2017. In the decisive second leg of the quarter-finals against Fortaleza, the goalkeeper was the decisive player, making several saves to save the team in a 1–1 draw. In the Copa do Brasil, the team had an excellent campaign, eliminating teams such as Coritiba, Paysandu, and São Paulo, until being eliminated in the quarter-finals in a controversial game against Atlético-MG, winning the second leg 1–0 in regular time and losing 4–2 on penalties, receiving praise from the great goalkeeper Victor.

Throughout the season, he played a total of 42 games, including 17 in Serie C, 8 in the Copa do Brasil, and 17 in the Gauchão, conceding 43 goals and keeping 12 clean sheets.

His tenure at the club was marked by great saves and affection from the fans, participating in a total of 56 games, conceding 62 goals and keeping 18 clean sheets.

=== Chapecoense ===
On 20 December 2016, Elias was loaned to Série A club Chapecoense for one year, mainly a replacement to deceased Danilo. A backup to Jandrei, he only appeared rarely but was still bought outright by the club in January 2018.

On 10 May 2018, Elias was loaned to fellow top tier club Vitória for 18 months. The following 29 January, however, after suffering relegation, he terminated his contract and returned to his parent club.

== Career statistics ==
As of 26 October 2021.

| Club | Season | League | | | State League | | Cup | | Continental | | Other | | Total | |
| Club | Season | Division | Apps | Goals | Apps | Goals | Apps | Goals | Apps | Goals | Apps | Goals | Apps | Goals |
|---|---|---|---|---|---|---|---|---|---|---|---|---|---|---|
| Juventude | 2014 | Série C | 0 | 0 | 0 | 0 | — | | — | | 1 (Note: Appearance(s) in Copa FGF) | 0 | 6 | 0 |
| Juventude | 2015 | Série C | 14 | 0 | 0 | 0 | — | | — | | — | | 14 | 0 |
| Juventude | 2016 | Série C | 17 | 0 | 17 | 0 | 8 | 0 | — | | — | | 42 | 0 |
| Juventude | Total | | 31 | 0 | 17 | 0 | 8 | 0 | — | | 1 | 0 | 57 | 0 |
| Chapecoense (loan) | 2017 | Série A | 0 | 0 | 6 | 0 | 1 | 0 | 0 | 0 | 1 (Note: Appearance(s) in Primeira Liga) | 0 | 8 | 0 |
| Chapecoense | 2018 | Série A | 0 | 0 | 2 | 0 | 0 | 0 | — | | — | | 2 | 0 |
| Chapecoense | 2019 | Série A | 0 | 0 | — | | 0 | 0 | — | | — | | 0 | 0 |
| Chapecoense | 2020 | Série B | 0 | 0 | 0 | 0 | 1 | 0 | — | | — | | 1 | 0 |
| Chapecoense | Total | | 0 | 0 | 8 | 0 | 2 | 0 | 0 | 0 | 1 | 0 | 11 | 0 |
| Vitória (loan) | 2018 | Série A | 8 | 0 | — | | — | | — | | — | | 8 | 0 |
| Azuriz (loan) | 2021 | Paranaense | — | | 0 | 0 | — | | — | | — | | 0 | 0 |
| Paysandu (loan) | 2021 | Série C | 0 | 0 | — | | — | | — | | 1 (Note: Appearance(s) in Copa Verde) | 0 | 1 | 0 |
| Career total | | | 39 | 0 | 25 | 0 | 10 | 0 | 0 | 0 | 3 | 0 | 77 | 0 |

== Honours ==
Chapecoense

- Campeonato Catarinense: 2017, 2020
- Campeonato Brasileiro Série B: 2020

Operário Ferroviário

- Campeonato Paranaense: 2025
