= Luizinho Lopes =

Brazilian football manager

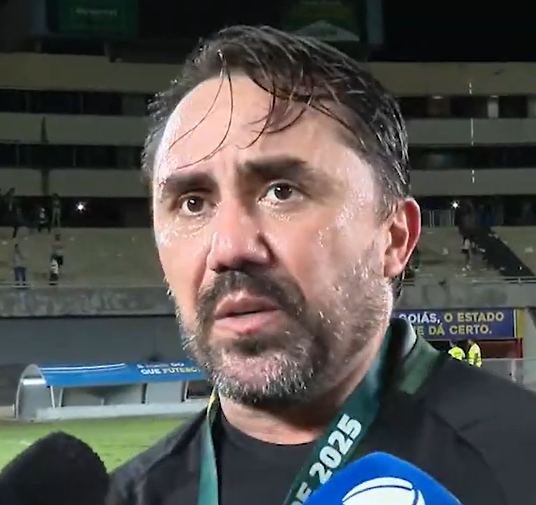
- Lopes in 2025

Personal information
- Full name: Luiz Júnior de Souza Lopes
- Date of birth: 8 October 1981 (age 45)
- Place of birth: Pau dos Ferros, Brazil
- Position: Midfielder

Youth career
- América de Natal

Senior career*
Years	Team	Apps	(Gls)
2001–2003	América de Natal		
2005	Santa Cruz de Natal		
- Paulista
- Chapecoense

Managerial career
- 2013: América de Natal U20
- 2014: Treze (assistant)
- 2014: Remo (assistant)
- 2015: América de Natal (assistant)
- 2016–2018: Globo
- 2018: Confiança
- 2019: América de Natal
- 2019: Treze
- 2020: Uberlândia
- 2020: Manaus
- 2021: Manaus
- 2021: Jacuipense
- 2021–2022: Confiança
- 2023–2024: Brusque
- 2024: Vila Nova
- 2025: Paysandu
- 2025: Vila Nova
- 2026: Operário Ferroviário
- * Club domestic league appearances and goals

Luiz Júnior de Souza Lopes (born 8 October 1981), known as Luizinho Lopes, is a Brazilian football coach and former player who played as a midfielder.

== Career ==
Born in Pau dos Ferros, Rio Grande do Norte, Lopes was an América de Natal youth graduate, and went on to feature in the first team squad for three years before leaving. He subsequently represented Santa Cruz de Natal, Paulista and Chapecoense before retiring in 2008 at the age of 27, due to injuries.

After retiring, Lopes was an under-20 coach at his first club América, and later worked as an assistant of Leandro Sena at Treze and Roberto Fernandes at Remo in the 2014 season. He returned to América in 2015, now as an assistant, before being named head coach of Globo FC on 30 March 2016.

Lopes led Globo to a first-ever promotion to the Série C in 2017, but asked to leave the club on 9 February 2018. Eleven days later, he took over fellow third division side Confiança, but was sacked on 24 July.

Lopes returned to América on 20 September 2018, after being presented as head coach of the club for the 2019 season. Dismissed the following 1 February, he was named at the helm of Treze on 26 June 2019, but was relieved from his duties on 18 July.

On 17 February 2020, Lopes was named head coach of Uberlândia, but left the club on 12 August to take over Manaus FC in the third tier. He left the club on 1 December, but returned on 11 March 2021, replacing Luizinho Vieira.

Despite winning the 2021 Campeonato Amazonense, Lopes resigned from Manaus on 24 May of that year, and was named Jacuipense head coach on 2 August. He also resigned from the latter 21 days later, after just two matches, and returned to Confiança just hours later, with the side now in the Série B.

On 24 November 2021, despite the club's relegation, Lopes renewed his contract with Confiança for a further year, but was sacked on 13 April 2022. On 11 November, he was appointed at the helm of Brusque for the upcoming campaign.

Lopes won the 2023 Recopa Catarinense with Brusque, also reaching the 2023 Campeonato Catarinense finals and achieving promotion from the 2023 Série C. On 30 October of that year, he signed a new one-year deal.

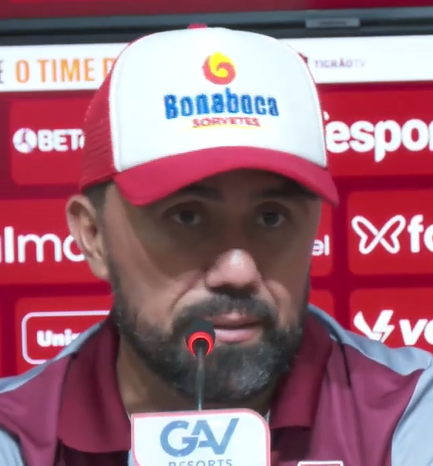
Lopes as head coach of Vila Nova in 2024

Lopes was sacked by the Quadricolor on 20 May 2024, following a 4–0 loss to Santos. Three days later, he replaced Márcio Fernandes at the helm of fellow second division side Vila Nova, but was also dismissed on 20 October.

On 10 February 2025, Lopes was announced as head coach of Paysandu, again replacing Fernandes. He won the 2025 Copa Verde on penalties, but was sacked on 2 June, and returned to Vila nine days later.

On 1 August 2025, Lopes was dismissed from Vila. On 20 January 2026, he was announced as head coach of Operário Ferroviário also in the second division.

Lopes won the 2026 Campeonato Paranaense with the Fantasma, but was sacked on 7 October 2026, after a poor run of form.

== Honours ==
=== Coach ===
Manaus

- Campeonato Amazonense: 2021

Brusque

- Recopa Catarinense: 2023

Paysandu

- Copa Verde: 2025

Operário Ferroviário

- Campeonato Paranaense: 2026
