= Pedro Müller =

Brazilian footballer

Personal information
- Full name: Pedro Henrique Müller Zin
- Date of birth: 12 April 2002 (age 24)
- Position: Defender

Team information
- Current team: Rio Branco-PR

Youth career
- –2020: Rio Branco-PR

Senior career*
Years	Team	Apps	(Gls)
2020–	Rio Branco-PR	2	(0)
- * Club domestic league appearances and goals as of 16:14, 4 August 2020 (UTC)

Pedro Henrique Müller Zin (born 12 April 2002), commonly known as Pedro Müller, is a Brazilian footballer who currently plays as a forward for Rio Branco-PR.

== Career statistics ==
=== Club ===
As of 4 August 2020.

Club	Season	League			State League		Cup		Continental		Other		Total	
Club	Season	Division	Apps	Goals	Apps	Goals	Apps	Goals	Apps	Goals	Apps	Goals	Apps	Goals
Rio Branco-PR	2020	Série B	0	0	2 (Note: Appearances in the Campeonato Paranaense)	0	0	0	0	0	0	0	2	0
Career total			0	0	2	0	0	0	0	0	0	0	2	0
