= Jhan Pool Torres =

Colombian footballer

Personal information
- Full name: Jhan Pool Torres Cañete
- Date of birth: 15 April 2001 (age 25)
- Place of birth: Barranquilla, Colombia
- Height: 1.86 m (6 ft 1 in)
- Position: Centre-back

Team information
- Current team: Athletic (on loan from Operário Ferroviário )

Youth career
- –2019: Barranquilla FC

Senior career*
Years	Team	Apps	(Gls)
2019–2025	Barranquilla FC	104	(5)
2024–2025	→ Brusque (loan)	50	(0)
2026–	Operário Ferroviário	11	(0)
2026–	→ Athletic (loan)	14	(1)
- * Club domestic league appearances and goals as of 18 November 2026

Jhan Pool Torres Cañete (born 15 April 2001), also spelled as Jhanpol Torres, is a Colombian professional footballer who plays as centre-back for the Brazilian club Athletic, on loan from Operário Ferroviário.

== Career ==
Having started his career with Barranquilla FC, he played for the club until 2023, playing for four seasons in Colombia's Primera B category. In August 2024, he was announced on loan to Brusque for the Série B dispute, remaining for the following year. After considering his move to Junior Barranquilla, the loan was extended until the end of 2025.

For 2026 season, Torres signed with Operário Ferroviário.
