= Gabriel Boschilia =

Brazilian footballer (born 1996)

Personal information
- Full name: Gabriel Boschilia
- Date of birth: 5 March 1996 (age 30)
- Place of birth: Piracicaba, Brazil
- Height: 1.72 m (5 ft 8 in)
- Position: Midfielder

Team information
- Current team: Operário Ferroviário
- Number: 10

Youth career
- 2009–2012: Guarani
- 2012–2014: São Paulo

Senior career*
| Years | Team | Apps | (Gls) |
| 2014–2015 | São Paulo | 36 | (4) |
| 2015–2020 | Monaco | 26 | (6) |
| 2016 | → Standard Liège (loan) | 10 | (2) |
| 2018–2019 | → Nantes (loan) | 29 | (4) |
| 2020–2022 | Internacional | 35 | (2) |
| 2022–2023 | Coritiba | 20 | (1) |
| 2023–2024 | Győri ETO | 15 | (1) |
| 2024– | Operário Ferroviário | 107 | (33) |

International career^{‡}
| 2013 | Brazil U17 | 10 | (8) |
| 2014–2015 | Brazil U20 | 7 | (2) |
- * Club domestic league appearances and goals as of 18 November 2026 ‡ National team caps and goals as of 16 July 2015

Gabriel Boschilia (born 5 March 1996) is a Brazilian professional footballer who plays as a midfielder for Operário Ferroviário.

== Club career ==
=== São Paulo ===
Born in Piracicaba and raised in Santa Bárbara d'Oeste, Boschilia began his youth career at neighbouring Guarani. In November 2012 he signed a three-year deal with São Paulo, from an undisclosed fee (later revealed as R$600,000) and a €10 million clause. was initially assigned to the youth side.

On 22 January 2014 Boschilia made his first-team debut, coming on as a second-half substitute and also assisting Douglas in the last of a 4–0 home routing over Mogi Mirim. On 6 March he signed a new deal with Tricolor, running until March 2019.

Boschilia made his Série A debut on 20 April, starting in a 3–0 home success over Botafogo. His first goal in the category came on 23 November, the game's only in an away win against Santos.

=== Monaco ===
On 10 August 2015, Boschilia signed a five-year contract with Ligue 1 side AS Monaco FC, for a rumoured €9 million fee. On 11 January 2016, Boschilia was loaned to Standard Liège for the remainder of the season.

=== FC Nantes ===
Boschilia joined FC Nantes on a season-long loan deal on 7 August 2018.

=== Internacional ===
On 28 January 2020, Brazilian club Internacional announced the signing of Boschilia, on a three-year contract.

== International career ==
On 9 July 2013, Boschilia was called up for Brazil under-17s ahead of the World Cup. He finished the tournament as Brazil's top goalscorer, netting six times (only one goal behind overall top scorer Valmir Berisha) but his side was defeated in the quarterfinals.

== Career statistics ==
As of 29 November 2021

Appearances and goals by club, season and competition
| Club | Season | League | | | State league (Note: Including Campeonato Paulista and Campeonato Gaúcho.) | | National cup | | League cup | | Continental (Note: Including Copa Sudamericana and Copa Libertadores.) | | Other | | Total | |
| Club | Season | Division | Apps | Goals | Apps | Goals | Apps | Goals | Apps | Goals | Apps | Goals | Apps | Goals | Apps | Goals |
|---|---|---|---|---|---|---|---|---|---|---|---|---|---|---|---|---|
| São Paulo | 2014 | Série A | 18 | 1 | 4 | 0 | 3 | 0 | — | | 3 | 1 | — | | 28 | 2 |
| São Paulo | 2015 | Série A | 6 | 1 | 8 | 2 | 0 | 0 | — | | 2 | 0 | — | | 16 | 3 |
| São Paulo | Total | | 24 | 2 | 12 | 2 | 3 | 0 | — | | 5 | 1 | — | | 44 | 5 |
| Monaco | 2015–16 | Ligue 1 | 5 | 0 | — | | 0 | 0 | 1 | 0 | 0 | 0 | — | | 6 | 0 |
| Monaco | 2016–17 | Ligue 1 | 11 | 6 | — | | 2 | 0 | 1 | 2 | 2 | 0 | — | | 16 | 8 |
| Monaco | 2017–18 | Ligue 1 | 5 | 0 | — | | 0 | 0 | 1 | 0 | 1 | 0 | — | | 7 | 0 |
| Monaco | 2019–20 | Ligue 1 | 5 | 0 | — | | 1 | 0 | 0 | 0 | 0 | 0 | — | | 6 | 0 |
| Monaco | Total | | 26 | 6 | — | | 3 | 0 | 3 | 2 | 3 | 0 | — | | 35 | 8 |
| Standard Liège (loan) | 2015–16 | Jupiler Pro League | 10 | 2 | — | | 2 | 0 | — | | 0 | 0 | — | | 12 | 2 |
| Nantes (loan) | 2018–19 | Ligue 1 | 29 | 4 | — | | 2 | 1 | 1 | 0 | 0 | 0 | — | | 32 | 5 |
| Internacional | 2020 | Série A | 13 | 1 | 7 | 1 | 0 | 0 | — | | 9 | 3 | — | | 29 | 5 |
| Internacional | 2021 | Série A | 15 | 0 | 0 | 0 | 2 | 0 | — | | 2 | 0 | — | | 19 | 0 |
| Internacional | Total | | 28 | 1 | 7 | 1 | 2 | 0 | — | | 11 | 3 | — | | 48 | 5 |
| Career total | | | 117 | 15 | 19 | 3 | 12 | 1 | 4 | 2 | 19 | 4 | 0 | 0 | 171 | 25 |

== Honours ==
=== Club ===
Monaco

- Ligue 1: 2016–17

Operário Ferroviário

- Campeonato Paranaense: 2025, 2026
