= Copa Paraná =

Brazilian football tournament

The Copa Paraná (formerly Taça FPF) is a Brazilian football tournament played in the second half of the year. A spot in the Copa do Brasil and in the Campeonato Brasileiro Série D is granted for the winner of the competition. The winner of the cup also competes in the Recopa Sul-Brasileira. The competition is organized by the Paraná State Football Federation.

== History ==
With its first edition in 1998, the competition was named Copa Paraná and had two editions before going into a hiatus. An edition occurred in 2003 under the name of Copa Sesquicentenário, before returning to its previous name in 2006, after another year of hiatus.

Another period of inactivity occurred between 2009 and 2014, and the competition returned in 2015 under the name of Taça FPF, having four editions in the following five years. In 2025, after five years without dispute, the competition returned, now giving a spot in the Copa do Brasil for the winners.

For the 2026 season, the tournament returned to the original name of Copa Paraná.

== Titles in chronological order ==
Season	Champion	Runner-up
1998	Atlético Paranaense	Grêmio Maringá
1999	Grêmio Maringá	Londrina
2000–2002	Not held
2003	Atlético Paranaense	Coritiba
2004–2005	Not held
2006	Roma	Iraty
2007	J. Malucelli	Londrina
2008	Londrina	Cianorte
2009–2010	Not held
2015	Maringá	Toledo
2016	Operário Ferroviário	Andraus
2017	Maringá	FC Cascavel
2018	Not held
2019	Nacional de Rolândia	Independente
2020–2024	Not held
2025	Cianorte	Azuriz
2026	Athletico Paranaense	Paraná

== Titles by team ==
- 3 titles
  - Athletico Paranaense
- 2 titles
  - Maringá
- 1 title
  - Grêmio Maringá
  - Operário Ferroviário
  - J. Malucelli
  - Londrina
  - Roma de Apucarana
  - Nacional de Rolândia
  - Cianorte
