= Caio Maia =

Brazilian footballer

Personal information
- Full name: Caio da Silva Maia
- Date of birth: 1 April 2005 (age 21)
- Place of birth: Paulo de Faria, Brazil
- Height: 1.77 m (5 ft 10 in)
- Position: Forward

Team information
- Current team: Londrina (on loan from Atlético Mineiro)

Youth career
- 2018–2022: Ponte Preta
- 2022: → Atlético Mineiro (loan)
- 2023–2024: Atlético Mineiro

Senior career*
Years	Team	Apps	(Gls)
2024–	Atlético Mineiro	2	(0)
2026–	→ Londrina (loan)	4	(0)
- * Club domestic league appearances and goals as of 18 November 2026

Caio da Silva Maia (born 1 April 2005), known as Caio Maia, is a Brazilian footballer who plays as a forward for Londrina, on loan from Atlético Mineiro.

== Career ==
Born in Paulo de Faria, São Paulo, Caio Maia joined Atlético Mineiro's youth sides in 2022; initially on loan from Ponte Preta, the club later activated his buyout clause and he signed a permanent contract until 2027. He made his first team – and Série A – debut on 16 October 2024, coming on as a second-half substitute for Brahian Palacios in a 1–1 away draw against Fortaleza.

On 5 February 2026, Caio Maia joined Londrina on a one-year loan deal.

== Career statistics ==
As of 12 January 2026

Club	Season	League			State League		Cup		Continental		Other		Total	
Club	Season	Division	Apps	Goals	Apps	Goals	Apps	Goals	Apps	Goals	Apps	Goals	Apps	Goals
Atlético Mineiro	2024	Série A	2	0	—		0	0	0	0	—		2	0
Atlético Mineiro	2025	Série A	0	0	0	0	0	0	0	0	—		0	0
Career total			2	0	0	0	0	0	0	0	0	0	2	0

== Honours ==
Atlético Mineiro

- Campeonato Mineiro: 2025
