= Estádio Onésio Brasileiro Alvarenga =

Football stadium in Goiânia

Onésio Brasileiro Alvarenga
- Estádio Vila Nova, OBA
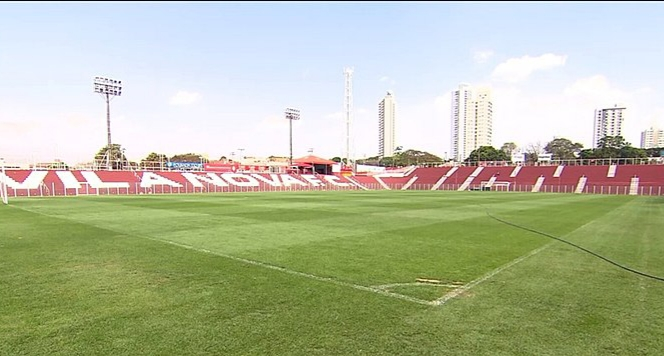
- Interactive map of Onésio Brasileiro Alvarenga
- Full name: Estádio Onésio Brasileiro Alvarenga
- Location: Goiânia, GO, Brazil
- Coordinates: 16°40′24.81″S 49°14′15.81″W
- Owner: Vila Nova
- Operator: Vila Nova
- Capacity: 11,788
- Surface: Natural grass
- Field size: 105 × 68 m

Construction
- Opened: 1980

Tenant
- Vila Nova

Estádio Onésio Brasileiro Alvarenga, also known as Estádio Vila Nova, or Estádio OBA, is a multi-use stadium located in Centro neighborhood, Goiânia, Brazil. It is used mostly for football matches and hosts the home matches of Vila Nova Futebol Clube. The stadium has a maximum capacity of 11,788 people.

It is named after Onésio Brasileiro Alvarenga, a Vila Nova's former player and former director, who was responsible for the club's professionalization.
