= Vitinho Mota =

Brazilian footballer

Personal information
- Full name: Victor Hugo de Faria Mota
- Date of birth: 27 July 2003 (age 23)
- Place of birth: Marília, Brazil
- Height: 1.74 m (5 ft 9 in)
- Position: Forward

Team information
- Current team: Londrina (on loan from Red Bull Bragantino)
- Number: 7

Youth career
- 2018–2023: Desportivo Brasil

Senior career*
Years	Team	Apps	(Gls)
2022–2024	Desportivo Brasil	3	(0)
2023–2024	→ Red Bull Bragantino II (loan)	18	(2)
2024	→ Red Bull Bragantino (loan)	2	(0)
2025–	Red Bull Bragantino	5	(0)
2025–	→ Londrina (loan)	63	(6)
- * Club domestic league appearances and goals as of 18 November 2026

Victor Hugo de Faria Mota (born 27 July 2003), known as Vitinho Mota or just Vitinho, is a Brazilian footballer who plays as a forward for Londrina, on loan from Red Bull Bragantino.

== Career ==
Vitinho began his career with Desportivo Brasil, and was promoted to the main squad ahead of the 2022 season. He made his first team debut on 16 March 2022, coming on as a second-half substitute in a 2–1 Campeonato Paulista Série A3 away loss to Votuporanguense.

In January 2023, after a further four appearances with the main squad, Vitinho was loaned to Red Bull Bragantino and was initially assigned to the reserves. He made his first team – and Série A – debut with Braga on 2 November 2024, replacing Vitinho in a 0–0 home draw against Cuiabá.

On 13 January 2025, Bragantino exercised Vitinho's buyout clause, with the player signing a permanent deal until the end of 2029.

== Career statistics ==
As of 29 January 2025.

Club	Season	League			State League		Cup		Continental		Other		Total	
Club	Season	Division	Apps	Goals	Apps	Goals	Apps	Goals	Apps	Goals	Apps	Goals	Apps	Goals
Desportivo Brasil	2022	Paulista A3	—		3	0	—		—		2 (Note: Appearance(s) in Copa Paulista)	0	5	0
Red Bull Bragantino II	2023	Paulista A3	—		5	1	—		—		10	3	15	4
Red Bull Bragantino II	2024	Paulista A3	—		13	1	—		—		7	1	20	2
Red Bull Bragantino II	Total		—		18	2	—		—		17	4	35	6
Red Bull Bragantino	2024	Série A	2	0	—		0	0	0	0	—		2	0
Red Bull Bragantino	2025	Série A	0	0	3	0	0	0	—		—		3	0
Red Bull Bragantino	Total		2	0	3	0	0	0	0	0	—		5	0
Career total			2	0	24	2	0	0	0	0	19	4	45	6
