= Weverton (footballer, born 1999) =

Brazilian footballer

Personal information
- Full name: Weverton Guilherme da Silva Souza
- Date of birth: 15 June 1999 (age 27)
- Place of birth: Maceió, Brazil
- Height: 1.81 m (5 ft 11 in)
- Position: Right back

Team information
- Current team: Londrina

Youth career
- 2014: CRB
- 2015–2019: Santa Cruz de Taquarana
- 2016: → Internacional (loan)
- 2018: → Internacional (loan)
- 2018–2019: → Figueirense (loan)

Senior career*
Years	Team	Apps	(Gls)
2019	Santa Cruz de Taquarana	0	(0)
2019	→ Figueirense (loan)	1	(0)
2019	Cruzeiro	5	(0)
2020–	Red Bull Bragantino	34	(1)
2022	→ Vasco da Gama (loan)	24	(0)
2022	→ Internacional (loan)	1	(0)
2023	→ Ponte Preta (loan)	20	(0)
2024	→ Goiás (loan)	11	(0)
2024–2025	Ferroviária	13	(1)
2025	CRB	21	(0)
2026–	Londrina	8	(0)
- * Club domestic league appearances and goals as of 18 November 2026

Weverton Guilherme da Silva Souza (born 15 June 1999), simply known as Weverton, is a Brazilian footballer who plays as a right back for Londrina.

== Club career ==
Weverton signed for Cruzeiro in early 2019.

== International career ==
Weverton was called up to the Brazil squad in May 2019 to gain experience. A video of him nutmegging compatriot Neymar went viral online later that month.

== Career statistics ==
As of 13 December 2021.

Club	Season	League			State League		Cup		Continental		Other		Total	
Club	Season	Division	Apps	Goals	Apps	Goals	Apps	Goals	Apps	Goals	Apps	Goals	Apps	Goals
Figueirense	2019	Série B	0	0	1 (Note: Appearance(s) in Campeonato Catarinense)	0	0	0	—		—		1	0
Cruzeiro	2019	Série A	5	0	—		0	0	—		—		5	0
Red Bull Bragantino	2020	Série A	10	0	5 (Note: Appearance(s) in Campeonato Paulista)	0	0	0	—		—		15	0
Red Bull Bragantino	2021	Série A	11	1	8	0	0	0	0	0	—		19	1
Red Bull Bragantino	Total		21	1	13	0	0	0	0	0	—		34	1
Career total			26	1	14	0	0	0	0	0	0	0	40	1
