= Maurício Kozlinski =

Brazilian footballer

Kozlinski
Personal information
- Full name: Maurício Kozlinski
- Date of birth: 18 June 1991 (age 35)
- Place of birth: Antônio Olinto, Brazil
- Height: 1.90 m (6 ft 3 in)
- Position: Goalkeeper

Team information
- Current team: Londrina
- Number: 30

Youth career
- Iraty

Senior career*
| Years | Team | Apps | (Gls) |
| 2010 | Iraty | | |
| 2011 | Veranópolis | 0 | (0) |
| 2012 | Santa Cruz-RS | 0 | (0) |
| 2012–2014 | Juventus-SC | 15 | (0) |
| 2015 | Metropolitano | 15 | (0) |
| 2015 | Operário Ferroviário | 1 | (0) |
| 2016–2018 | Avaí | 49 | (0) |
| 2019–2022 | Atlético Goianiense | 71 | (0) |
| 2022–2023 | Guarani | 51 | (0) |
| 2023–2024 | Fortaleza | 2 | (0) |
| 2025 | Vila Nova | 11 | (0) |
| 2026– | Londrina | 42 | (0) |
- * Club domestic league appearances and goals as of 18 November 2026

Maurício Kozlinski (born 18 June 1991), commonly known as Kozlinski, is a Brazilian professional footballer who plays as goalkeeper for Londrina.

== Honours ==
Atlético Goianiense

- Campeonato Goiano: 2019, 2020

Fortaleza

- Copa do Nordeste: 2024
