= Marcão (footballer, born 1975) =

Brazilian footballer

Personal information
- Full name: Marcos Alberto Skavinski
- Date of birth: 28 March 1975 (age 51)
- Place of birth: Curitiba, Brazil
- Height: 1.86 m (6 ft 1 in)
- Positions: Central defender; left back

Youth career
- 1991–1992: Coritiba

Senior career*
Years	Team	Apps	(Gls)
1996	Coritiba	0	(0)
1998–1999	São Caetano	0	(0)
1999	Atlético Mineiro	9	(0)
2000–2001	São Caetano	0	(0)
2000	→ Matonense (loan)	1	(0)
2001	Santo André	0	(0)
2002	Marília	0	(0)
2002–2003	Santo André	0	(0)
2003	Juventude	26	(1)
2004–2007	Atlético Paranaense	72	(1)
2006	→ Kawasaki Frontale (loan)	28	(2)
2007–2008	Internacional	19	(0)
2009–2010	Palmeiras	27	(1)
2010–2011	Goiás	23	(1)
Total		205	(6)

Managerial career
- 2015–2016: Atlético Paranaense U19
- 2018–2019: Athletico Paranaense U19
- 2020: Chapecoense
- 2021–2022: São Joseense
- 2023: Paraná
- * Club domestic league appearances and goals

Marcos Alberto Skavinski, commonly known as Marcão (born 28 March 1975 in Curitiba), is a Brazilian football coach and former player who played as a central defender.

== Club statistics ==
Club performance			League		Cup		League Cup		Total	
Season	Club	League	Apps	Goals	Apps	Goals	Apps	Goals	Apps	Goals
Japan			League		Emperor's Cup		J.League Cup		Total	
2006	Kawasaki Frontale	J1 League	28	2	2	0	9	1	39	3
Country	Japan		28	2	2	0	9	1	39	3
Total			28	2	2	0	9	1	39	3

== Honours ==
- São Paulo State League (2nd division): 2000
- Paraná State League: 2005
- Sul-Americana Cup: 2008
- Dubai Cup: 2008
- Rio Grande Do Sul State League: 2008

== Contract ==
- 5 January 2010 to 31 December 2010
