= Aylon =

Brazilian footballer (born 1992)

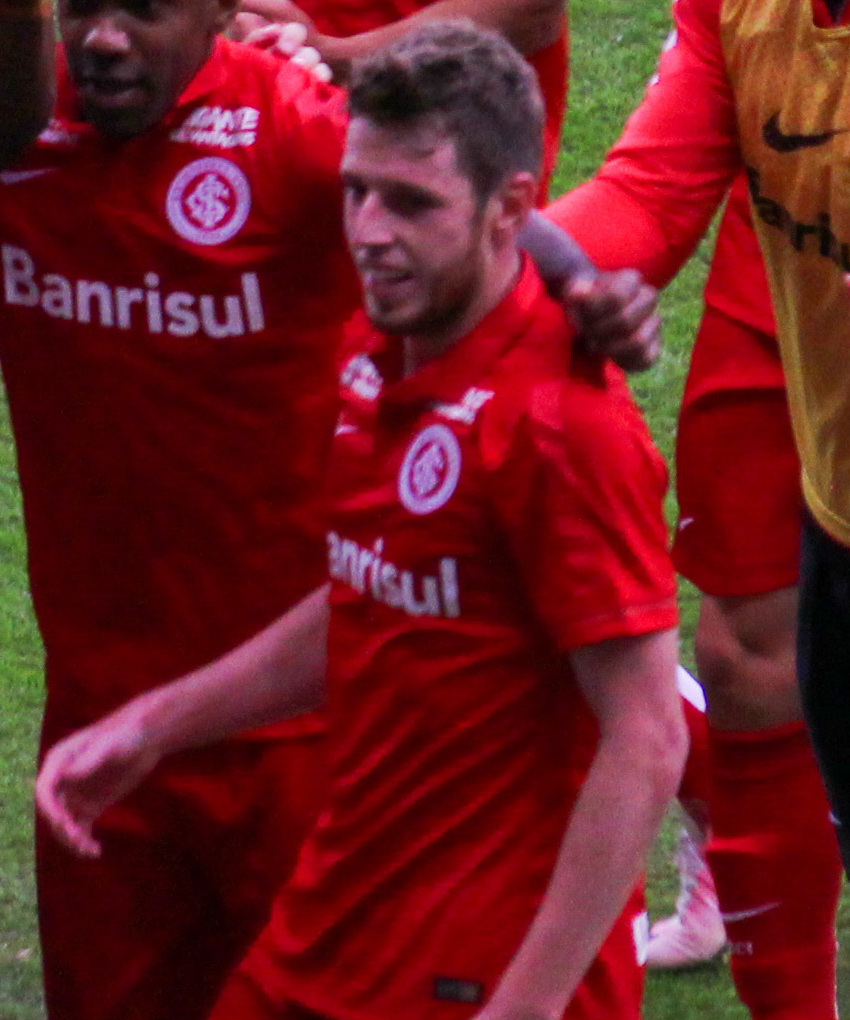
- Aylon playing at Inter in 2016

Personal information
- Full name: Aylon Darwin Tavella
- Date of birth: 7 April 1992 (age 34)
- Place of birth: Esteio, Brazil
- Height: 1.80 m (5 ft 11 in)
- Position: Forward

Team information
- Current team: Operário Ferroviário
- Number: 11

Youth career
- 2009–2010: Rio Grande
- 2010–2011: Caxias
- 2012: Rio Grande

Senior career*
Years	Team	Apps	(Gls)
2012–2013	São Paulo-RS	?	(10)
2013–2018	Internacional	23	(4)
2015	→ Paysandu (loan)	28	(4)
2017	→ Goiás (loan)	25	(4)
2018	→ América Mineiro (loan)	14	(0)
2019–2021	Chapecoense	70	(9)
2019	→ Atlético Goianiense (loan)	12	(1)
2021	CSA	21	(0)
2022–2023	Ituano	44	(10)
2023	Novorizontino	56	(14)
2024–2025	Ceará	76	(17)
2026–	Operário Ferroviário	43	(4)
- * Club domestic league appearances and goals as of 18 November 2026

Aylon Darwin Tavella (born 7 April 1992), known as Aylon, is a Brazilian footballer who plays as a forward for Operário Ferroviário.

== Career ==
Born in Esteio, Rio Grande do Sul, Aylon began his career at Sport Club Internacional. He had his first senior call-up on 14 November 2013, remaining an unused substitute as they lost 2–1 at Clube Atlético Mineiro in that year's Campeonato Brasileiro Série A, and repeated the feat three days later in a 3–1 loss at Goiás Esporte Clube.

The following 18 January, he scored on his senior debut in a 2–0 home win over Esporte Clube São Luiz in the first game of that year's Campeonato Gaúcho. Eight days later, in the first minute of the game, he scored in a 2–1 win at Esporte Clube Passo Fundo. He totalled two goals in six games as Inter won the title.

On 25 May 2014, Aylon made his national league debut, replacing Valdívia for the final 12 minutes of a 3–1 home loss to Esporte Clube Cruzeiro; his only other appearance of the season was on 7 September, when he came on in added time at the end of a 3–2 loss to Figueirense FC at the Estádio Beira-Rio.

On 16 January 2015, Aylon was loaned to Paysandu Sport Club for the year. He made his debut for the team from Belém on 21 February, playing the full 90 minutes of a 2–0 home win over Santos Futebol Clube (AP) in the first round of the 2015 Copa Verde (3–1 aggregate). He scored his first goal for the team on 7 March in the next round, opening a 4–1 win over Nacional-AM at the Estadio Leonidas Sodre de Castro. Aylon also represented the Papão in that year's Série B, scoring four goals in 28 games, including two on 13 November in a 3–2 home win over Luverdense Esporte Clube.

Chapecoense signed Aylon for the 2019 season.

== Honours ==
Internacional

- Campeonato Gaúcho: 2014, 2016

Goiás

- Campeonato Goiano: 2017

Chapecoense

- Campeonato Catarinense: 2020
- Campeonato Brasileiro Série B: 2020

CSA

- Campeonato Alagoano: 2021

Ceará

- Campeonato Cearense: 2024, 2025
