= Kevyn Lucas =

Brazilian footballer

Kevyn
Personal information
- Full name: Kevyn Lucas Ramos da Costa
- Date of birth: 28 December 1997 (age 28)
- Place of birth: São Gonçalo, Brazil
- Height: 1.78 m (5 ft 10 in)
- Position: Left-back

Team information
- Current team: Londrina
- Number: 33

Youth career
- Botafogo
- Resende
- 2017: → Náutico (loan)

Senior career*
Years	Team	Apps	(Gls)
2018–2020	Resende	10	(0)
2018	→ Náutico (loan)	11	(0)
2019	→ Salgueiro (loan)	5	(0)
2020–2021	Náutico	20	(0)
2021	CSA	14	(0)
2022–2023	Azuriz	5	(0)
2023	→ Resende (loan)	4	(0)
2023	Retrô	7	(0)
2023	→ Paysandu (loan)	12	(2)
2024–2025	Paysandu	47	(2)
2025	Ponte Preta	8	(0)
2026–	Londrina	30	(1)
- * Club domestic league appearances and goals as of 18 November 2026

Kevyn Lucas Ramos da Costa (born 28 December 1997), known as Kevyn Lucas or just Kevyn, is a Brazilian footballer who plays as a left-back for Londrina.

== Career ==
Kevyn was born in São Gonçalo, Rio de Janeiro, and represented Botafogo and Resende as a youth before moving on loan to Náutico in 2017. He made his first team debut with the latter on 19 January 2018, starting in a 3–2 Campeonato Pernambucano home win over América-PE.

Kevyn was regularly used by the Timbu until suffering a knee injury in May 2018. Upon returning in August, he was not used and left in October, after failing to agree terms on a new contract.

Kevyn moved to Salgueiro on loan ahead of the 2019 season, but featured rarely and subsequently returned to his parent club Resende. On 10 August 2020, he returned to Náutico, now in a permanent deal.

Kevyn went to Court against Náutico in February 2021, alleging unpaid wages, and despite having his contract rescinded in May, he was later ordered to pay a compensation to the club due to abandonment of employment. He then signed for CSA on 2 June.

On 15 December 2021, Kevyn agreed to a deal with Azuriz for the upcoming campaign. He subsequently returned to Resende on loan, and joined Retrô on 28 April 2023.

On 12 July 2023, Kevyn was announced at Paysandu. He rescinded his loan link on 26 October, but returned to the club the following 23 January, now in a permanent deal.

== Career statistics ==
As of 19 November 2024.

Club	Season	League			State League		Cup		Continental		Other		Total	
Club	Season	Division	Apps	Goals	Apps	Goals	Apps	Goals	Apps	Goals	Apps	Goals	Apps	Goals
Náutico	2018	Série C	2	0	9	0	6	0	—		3 (Note: Appearance(s) in Copa do Nordeste)	0	20	0
Salgueiro	2019	Série D	1	0	4	0	—		—		6	0	11	0
Resende	2020	Carioca	—		10	0	—		—		—		10	0
Náutico	2020	Série B	20	0	—		—		—		—		20	0
CSA	2021	Série B	14	0	—		—		—		—		14	0
Azuriz	2022	Série D	2	0	3	0	0	0	—		—		5	0
Resende	2023	Série D	0	0	4	0	—		—		—		4	0
Retrô	2023	Série D	7	0	—		—		—		—		7	0
Paysandu	2023	Série C	12	2	—		—		—		—		12	2
Paysandu	2024	Série B	31	2	9	0	2	0	—		6 (Note: Appearance(s) in Copa Verde)	0	48	2
Paysandu	Total		43	4	9	0	2	0	—		6	0	60	4
Career total			89	4	39	0	8	0	0	0	15	0	151	4

== Honours ==
Náutico

- Campeonato Pernambucano: 2018

Paysandu

- Copa Verde: 2024
- Campeonato Paraense: 2024
- Supercopa Grão-Pará: 2025
