= Viçosa do Ceará =

Municipality in Ceará, Brazil

- Municipality
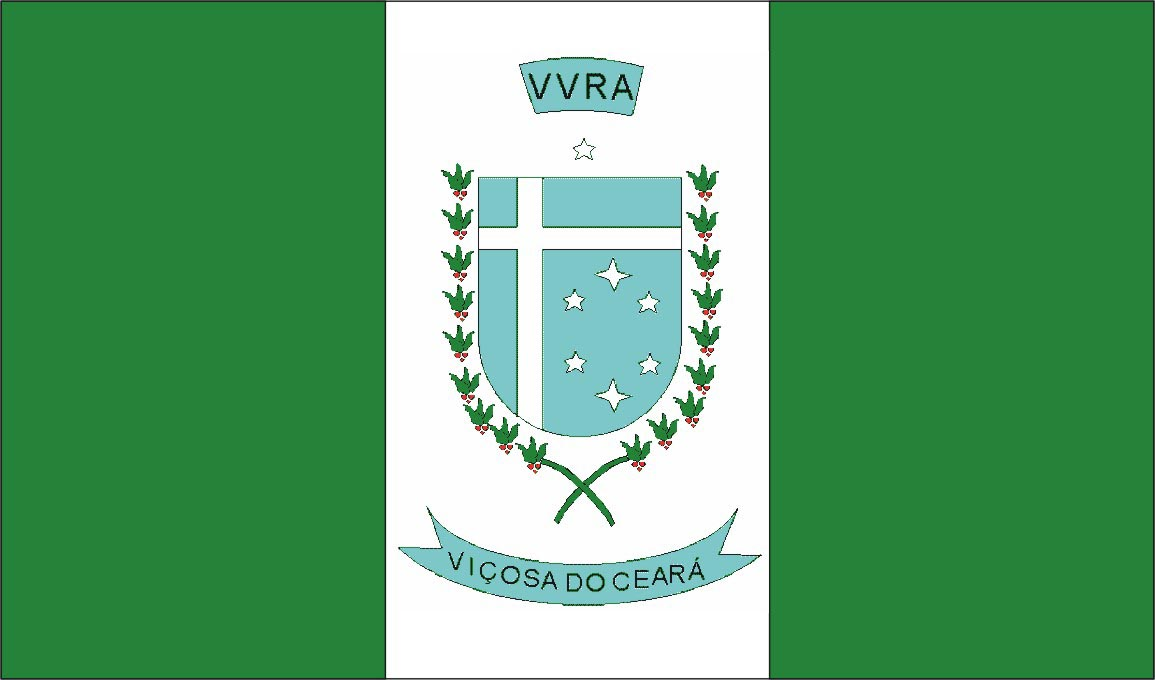
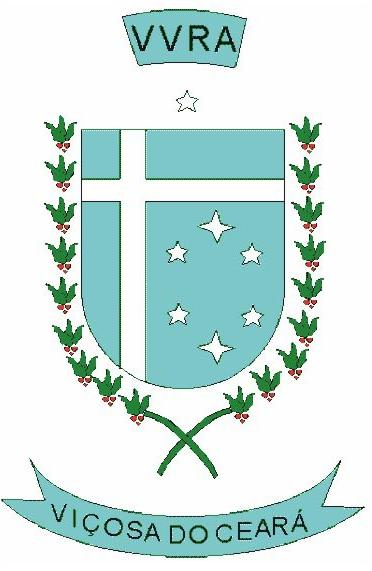
- Flag Coat of arms

- Location in Brazil
- Coordinates: 3°34′S 41°05′W
- Country: Brazil
- Region: Nordeste
- State: Ceará
- Mesoregion: Noroeste Cearense

Population (2020)
  - Total: 61,410
- Time zone: UTC−3 (BRT)

Viçosa do Ceará is a municipality in the state of Ceará in the Northeast region of Brazil.

The municipality contains part of the 1,592,550 hectares (3,935,300 acres) Serra da Ibiapaba Environmental Protection Area, created in 1996.

== See also ==
- List of municipalities in Ceará
