= Chumbinho (footballer, born 2003) =

Brazilian footballer

Personal information
- Full name: Willian da Silva Santos
- Date of birth: 22 September 2003 (age 23)
- Place of birth: Barra Mansa, Brazil
- Position: Midfielder

Team information
- Current team: Londrina
- Number: 55

Youth career
- Volta Redonda
- 2021–2022: → Red Bull Bragantino (loan)
- 2022–2023: Red Bull Bragantino
- 2025: Torreense U23

Senior career*
Years	Team	Apps	(Gls)
2023–2025	Red Bull Bragantino II	19	(1)
2024–2025	Red Bull Bragantino	2	(0)
2026–	Londrina	11	(0)
- * Club domestic league appearances and goals as of 18 November 2026

Willian da Silva Santos (born 22 September 2003), commonly known as Chumbinho, is a Brazilian footballer who plays as a midfielder for Londrina.

== Club career ==
Born in Barra Mansa, Rio de Janeiro, Chumbinho was a youth product of Volta Redonda. On 14 June 2021, he signed his first professional contract with the club, but was loaned to Red Bull Bragantino.

On 8 August 2022, Chumbinho signed a permanent deal with Braga until 2025. After playing for the reserve team Red Bull Bragantino II, he made his professional – and Série A – debut on 17 August 2024, coming on as a late substitute for Lincoln in a 2–1 home loss to Fortaleza.

On 1 July 2025, Chumbinho signed with Portuguese club Torreense. He was assigned to the Under-23 squad.

== Career statistics ==
As of 29 January 2025

Appearances and goals by club, season and competition
Club	Season	League			State league		Copa do Brasil		Continental		Other		Total	
Club	Season	Division	Apps	Goals	Apps	Goals	Apps	Goals	Apps	Goals	Apps	Goals	Apps	Goals
Red Bull Bragantino II	2023	Paulista A3	—		9	1	—		—		6 (Note: Appearances in Copa Paulista)	0	15	1
Red Bull Bragantino II	2024	Paulista A3	—		10	0	—		—		6	0	16	0
Red Bull Bragantino II	Total		—		19	1	—		—		12	0	31	1
Red Bull Bragantino	2024	Série A	2	0	—		0	0	0	0	—		2	0
Red Bull Bragantino	2025	Série A	0	0	0	0	0	0	—		—		0	0
Red Bull Bragantino	Total		2	0	0	0	0	0	0	0	—		2	0
Career total			2	0	19	1	0	0	0	0	12	0	33	1
