= Matheus Trindade =

Brazilian footballer

Personal information
- Full name: Matheus Trindade Gonçalves
- Date of birth: 6 March 1996 (age 30)
- Place of birth: Rio de Janeiro, Brazil
- Height: 1.81 m (5 ft 11 1/2 in)
- Position: Midfielder

Team information
- Current team: Operário Ferroviário
- Number: 39

Youth career
- 2008–2010: Fluminense
- 2011–2012: Audax Rio
- 2013–2016: Flamengo

Senior career*
Years	Team	Apps	(Gls)
2016–2018	Flamengo	0	(0)
2016	→ Goa (loan)	13	(0)
2017	→ Ceará (loan)	3	(0)
2017	→ Audax Osasco (loan)	9	(0)
2017–2018	→ Jamshedpur FC (loan)	15	(4)
2018	→ Atlético Goianiense (loan)	1	(0)
2019–2023	Tombense	15	(0)
2019–2020	→ Joinville (loan)	18	(3)
2020	→ Náutico (loan)	19	(0)
2021	→ Náutico (loan)	38	(0)
2022	→ Brusque (loan)	38	(0)
2023–2024	Vitória	12	(1)
2024	Suwon FC	3	(0)
2024	Paysandu	12	(0)
2025	Criciúma	45	(2)
2026–	Operário Ferroviário	41	(1)
- * Club domestic league appearances and goals as of 18 November 2026

Matheus Trindade Gonçalves (born 6 March 1996) is a Brazilian professional footballer who plays as a midfielder for Operário Ferroviário.

== Career ==
=== Flamengo ===
Born in Rio de Janeiro, Matheus started his career in the youth academy of Flamengo, although he never played an official match for the club, being loaned to several clubs before being released in the end of 2018.

==== FC Goa (loan) ====
In August 2016, Matheus signed with Indian Super League side Goa on loan until January. Gonçalves made his professional debut for Goa on 4 October 2016 in their opening match against NorthEast United.

=== Tombense ===
In January 2019, Gonçalves joined Tombense.

== Career statistics ==
As of 25 November 2019.

Club	Season	League			Cup		Continental		Other		Total	
Club	Season	Division	Apps	Goals	Apps	Goals	Apps	Goals	Apps	Goals	Apps	Goals
Goa (loan)	2016	ISL	13	0	0	0	—	—	—	—	13	0
Ceará (loan)	2017	Série B	0	0	0	0	—	—	3	0	3	0
Audax Osasco (loan)	2017	Série D	3	0	—	—	—	—	6	0	9	0
Jamshedpur FC (loan)	2017–18	ISL	15	4	0	0	—	—	—	—	15	4
Atlético Goianiense (loan)	2018	Série B	1	0	—	—	—	—	—	—	1	0
Tombense	2019	Série C	1	0	1	0	—	—	5	0	7	0
Joinville (loan)	2019	Série D	0	0	–	–	—	—	7	0	7	0
Career total			13	4	1	0	0	0	21	0	55	4

== Honours ==
Ceará

- Campeonato Cearense: 2017

Náutico

- Campeonato Pernambucano: 2021
