= Lucas Marques (footballer, born 1995) =

Brazilian footballer

Personal information
- Full name: Lucas Marques de Oliveira
- Date of birth: 24 May 1995 (age 31)
- Place of birth: Osasco, Brazil
- Height: 1.78 m (5 ft 10 in)
- Position: Midfielder

Team information
- Current team: Londrina
- Number: 8

Youth career
- Internacional

Senior career*
Years	Team	Apps	(Gls)
2015–2016	Internacional	1	(0)
2016	→ Lajeadense (loan)	7	(0)
2017	Chapecoense	16	(3)
2018	Vitória	9	(0)
2018	→ Figueirense (loan)	3	(0)
2019–2021	Santa Clara	5	(0)
2020	→ Estoril (loan)	3	(0)
2021–2022	Mafra	23	(0)
2022–2023	Vitória de Setúbal	15	(1)
2023–2024	Ypiranga	21	(2)
2025–	Londrina	74	(9)
- * Club domestic league appearances and goals as of 18 November 2026

Lucas Marques de Oliveira (born 24 May 1995), known as Lucas Marques, is a Brazilian professional footballer who plays as a midfielder for Londrina.

== Club career ==
Born in Osasco, São Paulo, Lucas Marques finished his formation with Internacional. On 23 May 2015 he made his first team – and Série A – debut, starting in a 1–1 away draw against Vasco da Gama.

In 2016, Lucas Marques was loaned to Lajeadense until the end of the year's Campeonato Gaúcho. Upon returning, he was assigned to the B-team, and opted to not renew his contract in December; he subsequently signed a one-year deal with Chapecoense on 4 January 2017.

On 30 December 2018, Santa Clara announced that they had signed Lucas Marques on a 2.5-year contract. Playing only five games during the first six months of the 2020–21 season, Marques was loaned out in January 2020 to Estoril for the rest of the season alongside his teammate Denis Pineda.

On 16 June 2021, he moved to the Liga Portugal 2 club Mafra.

In July 2022, Marques joined Liga 3 club Vitória de Setúbal.

On 6 November 2023, Marques returned to Brazil, signing for Série C side Ypiranga.

== Honours ==
Chapecoense

- Campeonato Catarinense: 2017
