= Estádio Germano Krüger =

Multi-Purpose Stadium in Brazil

Coordinates: 25°06′58.21″S 50°09′24.75″W

Germano Krüger
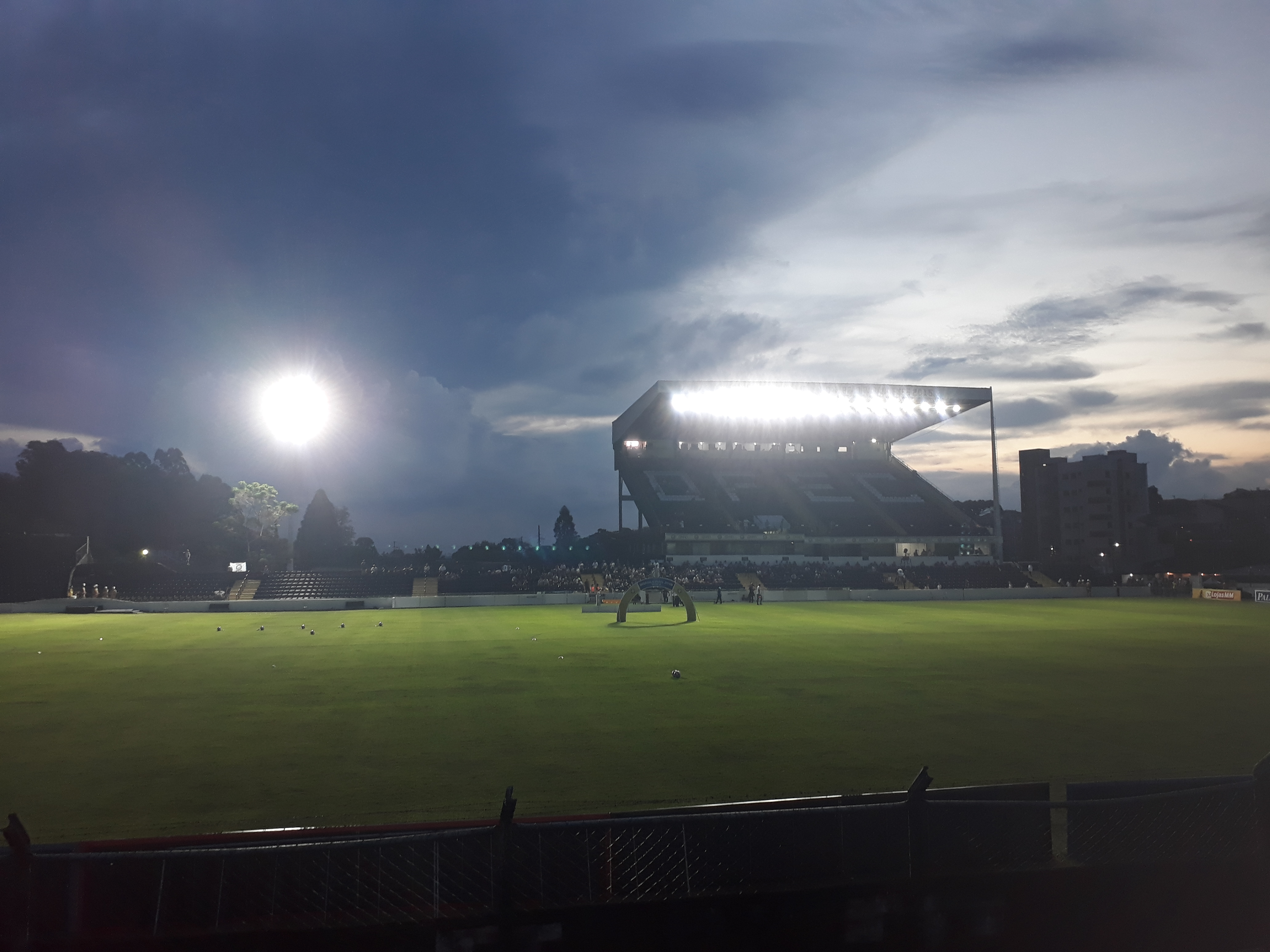
- Interactive map of Germano Krüger
- Full name: Estádio Germano Krüger
- Location: Ponta Grossa, Paraná, Brazil
- Owner: Operário Ferroviário
- Capacity: 10,632
- Surface: Grass

Construction
- Built: 1941
- Opened: 12 October 1941

Tenant
- Operário Ferroviário

Estádio Germano Krüger is a multi-purpose stadium in Ponta Grossa, Paraná, Brazil. Owned by Operário Ferroviário, it is currently used mostly for football matches. The stadium, which has a capacity of 10,632 people, is named after Germano Krüger, a German engineer who was Operário's president and designed the stadium.

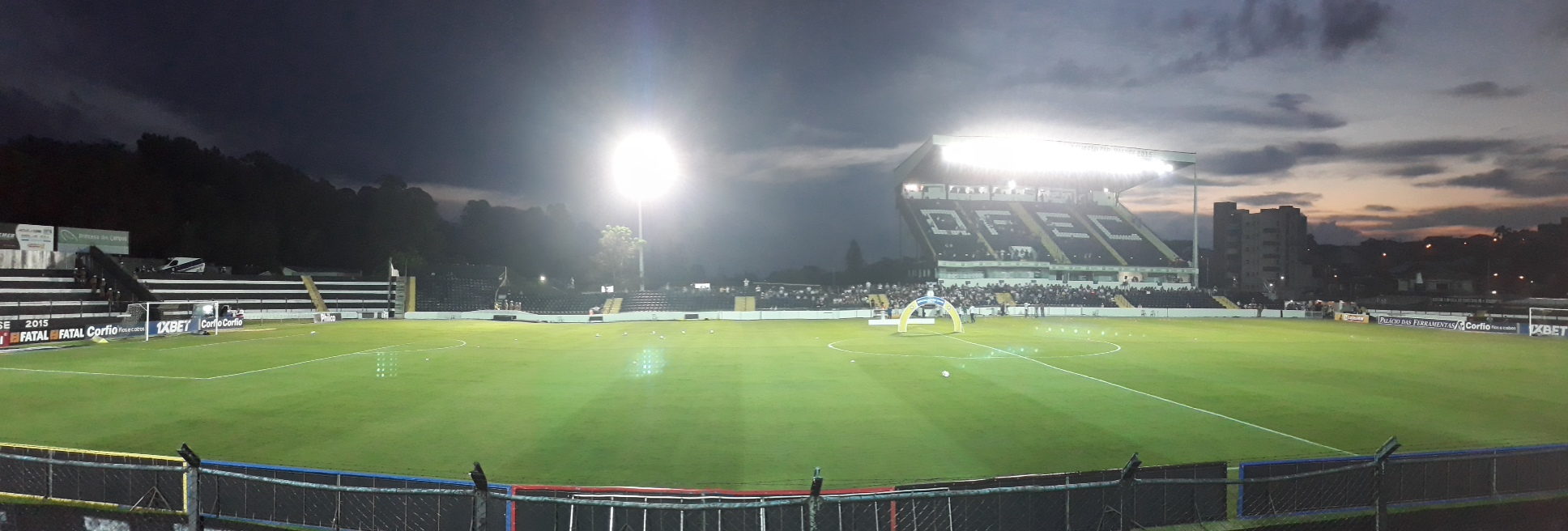
Germano Krüger before a night match in 2019
