= Clube Andraus Brasil =

Andraus
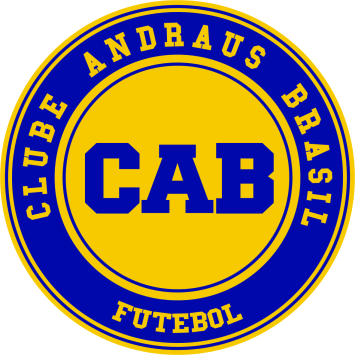
- Full name: Clube Andraus Brasil
- Nickname: Gigante da Pedreira
- Founded: 22 May 2003; 23 years ago
- Ground: Estádio Durival Britto
- Capacity: 20,000
- President: Nadim Andraus
- League: Campeonato Paranaense
- 2025: Paranaense, 10th of 12
Home colors	Away colors

Clube Andraus Brasil, simply known as Andraus, is a Brazilian football club based in Campo Largo, Paraná.

== History ==
The club was established in 2003, by the entrepreneur Nadim Andraus, owner of a quarry. Entered professional football in 2010, reaching the first division of Campeonato Paranaense for the 2024 season.

== Honours ==
- Copa Paraná
  - Runners-up: 2016
- Campeonato Paranaense Série Prata
  - Winners (1): 2023
- Campeonato Paranaense Série Bronze
  - Winners (2): 2014, 2019

== Appearances ==
Following is the summary of Andraus appearances in Campeonato Paranaense, since the club becomes professional in 2010:

Season	Division	Final position
2010	3rd	4th
2011	3rd	Not played
2012	3rd	Not played
2013	3rd	Not played
2014	3rd	1st
2015	2nd	8th
2016	2nd	5th
2017	2nd	7h
2018	2nd	9th (Relegated)
2019	3rd	1st
2020	2nd	6th
2021	2nd	6th
2022	2nd	3rd
2023	2nd	1st
2024	1st	9th
