= André Dhominique =

Brazilian footballer (born 2003)

Personal information
- Full name: André Dhominique Queiroz Santiago da Silva
- Date of birth: 7 October 2003 (age 23)
- Place of birth: Vera Cruz, Brazil
- Height: 1.78 m (5 ft 10 in)
- Position: Right-back

Team information
- Current team: Londrina
- Number: 13

Youth career
- 2016–2022: Bahia

Senior career*
Years	Team	Apps	(Gls)
2022–2025	Bahia	28	(0)
2024	→ Estrela Amadora (loan)	0	(0)
2026–	Londrina	12	(0)

International career^{‡}
2023–	Brazil U20	13	(0)
Medal record
Men's football
Representing Brazil
South American U-20 Championship
Winner	2023 Colombia
- * Club domestic league appearances and goals as of 18 November 2026 ‡ National team caps and goals as of 04:48, 25 February 2023 (UTC)

André Dhominique Queiroz Santiago da Silva (born 7 October 2003), known as André Dhominique or just André, is a Brazilian professional footballer who plays as a right-back for Londrina.

== Career ==
On 31 January 2024, Bahia loaned André to Portuguese Primeira Liga club Estrela da Amadora until the end of the 2023–24 season, with an option to extend the spell for a further year.

== Career statistics ==
As of 25 February 2023.

Appearances and goals by club, season and competition
Club	Season	League			State league (Note: Includes Campeonato Baiano.)		Cup (Note: Includes Copa do Brasil.)		Continental		Other (Note: Includes Copa do Nordeste.)		Total	
Club	Season	Division	Apps	Goals	Apps	Goals	Apps	Goals	Apps	Goals	Apps	Goals	Apps	Goals
Bahia	2022	Série B	20	0	2	0	2	0	—		4	0	28	0
Bahia	2023	Série A	0	0	0	0	2	0	—		1	0	3	0
Career total			20	0	2	0	4	0	0	0	5	0	31	0

== Honours ==
Bahia

- Campeonato Baiano: 2023

=== International ===
Brazil U20

- South American U-20 Championship: 2023
