= Iago Teles =

Brazilian footballer

Personal information
- Full name: Iago Teles da Silva
- Date of birth: 30 June 2000 (age 26)
- Place of birth: Barueri, Brazil
- Height: 1.77 m (5 ft 10 in)
- Position: Forward

Team information
- Current team: Londrina
- Number: 11

Youth career
- 2015–2019: Audax-SP
- 2019–2020: Red Bull Brasil
- 2020–2021: Red Bull Bragantino

Senior career*
Years	Team	Apps	(Gls)
2018–2019	Audax-SP	3	(0)
2019–2020	Red Bull Brasil	29	(4)
2020–2022	Red Bull Bragantino	0	(0)
2021–2022	→ Ituano (loan)	26	(2)
2022	→ Botafogo-PB (loan)	3	(1)
2023	Inter de Limeira	11	(1)
2023	CSA	21	(1)
2023–2024	Guarani	10	(1)
2024–	Londrina	68	(23)
- * Club domestic league appearances and goals as of 30 January 2026

Iago Teles da Silva (born 30 June 2000), simply known as Iago Teles, is a Brazilian professional footballer who plays as a forward for Londrina.

== Career ==
Trained in the youth sectors of Grêmio Audax-SP, Iago Teles also played for Red Bull Brasil and Red Bull Bragantino in the under-20 categories. In 2021 he stood out playing for Ituano, scoring one of the goals in the final of the 2021 Campeonato Brasileiro Série C. He later played for Botafogo-PB, Inter de Limeira, CSA and Guarani. Currently plays for Londrina EC.

== Personal life ==
Iago is the grandson of former player Barnabé, who played for Guarani FC in the 1970s.

== Honours ==
Grêmio Audax

- Campeonato Paulista Série A3: 2019

Ituano

- Campeonato Brasileiro Série C: 2021

Individual

- 2025 Campeonato Brasileiro Série C top scorer: 8 goals
