= Independente Futebol São Joseense =

Brazilian football club

São Joseense
- Full name: Independente Futebol São Joseense
- Nickname: Azulão
- Founded: 22 May 2015; 11 years ago
- Ground: Estádio do Pinhão
- Capacity: 4,047
- President: Kleiton Rodrigo Bacetto
- Head coach: Marcão
- League: Campeonato Brasileiro Série D Campeonato Paranaense
- 2025: Paranaense, 8th of 12
Home colours	Away colours	Third colours

Independente Futebol São Joseense, known as Independente or São Joseense, is a Brazilian football club based in São José dos Pinhais, Paraná. Founded in 2015, the club plays in the Campeonato Paranaense.

== History ==
Founded on 22 May 2015, São Joseense played their first competition in the 2016 Campeonato Paranaense Série Bronze, the third division of the state league. In 2017, the club won the third division, and played four seasons in the Campeonato Paranaense Série Prata before achieving promotion in 2021 as champions.

In March 2022, the club ensured their qualification in the 2023 Série D, after finishing in the top eight of the year's Campeonato Paranaense.

== Honours ==
- Copa Paraná
  - Runners-up (1): 2019
- Campeonato Paranaense Série Prata
  - Winners (1): 2021
- Campeonato Paranaense Série Bronze
  - Winners (1): 2017
