= Azuriz Futebol Clube =

Brazilian football club

Azuriz
- Full name: Azuriz Futebol Clube
- Nickname: Gralha-azul (Azure jay)
- Founded: February 2018; 8 years ago
- Ground: Estádio Os Pioneiros
- Capacity: 3,000
- President: Nelson Ramos
- Head coach: Gilson Kleina
- League: Campeonato Brasileiro Série D Campeonato Paranaense
- 2025 2025: Série D, 54th of 64; Paranaense, 7th of 12
Home colours	Away colours

Azuriz Futebol Clube, known as Azuriz, is a Brazilian football team based in Pato Branco in the state of Paraná. Founded in 2018, the club plays in the Campeonato Brasileiro Série D and the Campeonato Paranaense, holding home matches at the Estádio Os Pioneiros in Pato Branco, with a capacity of 3,000 people.

== History ==
Founded in February 2018 with focus on the youth categories, Azuriz had to register a first team in 2019 due to the Federação Paranaense de Futebol regulations. They finished fourth in the third division of the Campeonato Paranaense, but achieved promotion to the second division after Arapongas and Foz do Iguaçu decided not to play in the 2020 edition.

On 2 December 2020, Azuriz won the second division of the Paranaense after defeating Maringá.

In 2022, Azuriz made history in the Copa do Brasil, being eliminated undefeated by Bahia after two draws in the third phase of the competition. In the previous phases, Azuriz eliminated the teams of Botafogo-SP and Mirassol.

== Honours ==
- Copa Paraná
  - Runners-up (1): 2025
- Campeonato Paranaense Série Prata
  - Winners (1): 2020
