= Operário Ferroviário Esporte Clube =

Brazilian association football club based in Ponta Grossa, Paraná, Brazil

Operário Ferroviário
- Full name: Operário Ferroviário Esporte Clube
- Nicknames: OFEC; Alvinegro Paranaense (Paraná's Black & White); Fantasma da Vila (Ghost of the Town); Fantasma de Vila Oficinas (Ghost of the Oficinas' Village); Trem Fantasma (Ghost Train)
- Founded: 1 May 1912; 114 years ago
- Ground: Germano Krüger
- Capacity: 10,632
- President: Álvaro Goes
- Head coach: Luizinho Lopes
- League: Campeonato Brasileiro Série B Campeonato Paranaense
- 2025 2025: Série B, 12th of 20; Paranaense, 1st of 12 (champions)
- Website: www.operarioferroviario.com.br
| Home colors | Away colors | Third colors |

Operário Ferroviário Esporte Clube, more commonly referred to as Operário Ferroviário, Operário de Ponta Grossa or simply Operário-PR, is a Brazilian professional association football club in Ponta Grossa, Paraná which currently plays in Série B, the second tier of Brazilian football, as well as in the Campeonato Paranaense, the top division of the Paraná state football league.

They competed in Série A once.

== History ==
The team was founded on 1 May 1912, thus being the second oldest club in the state of Paraná. The club won the Southern Zone Campeonato Paranaense Second Level in 1969. Operário competed in the Série A in 1979 and in the Série B in 1980, 1989, 1990, 1991, 2019, 2020, 2021, 2022, 2024 and 2025.

== Stadium ==
They play their home games at the Germano Krüger stadium. The stadium has a maximum capacity of 10,632 people.

== Honours ==
=== Official tournaments ===
National
| Competitions | Titles | Seasons |
|---|---|---|
| Campeonato Brasileiro Série C | 1 | 2018 |
| Campeonato Brasileiro Série D | 1 | 2017 |
State
| Competitions | Titles | Seasons |
| Campeonato Paranaense | 3 | 2015, 2025, 2026 |
| Copa Paraná | 1 | 2016 |
| Campeonato Paranaense Série Prata | 3^{s} | 1916, 1969, 2018 |

- record
- ^{s} shared record

=== Others tournaments ===
==== State ====
- Campeonato Paranaense do Interior (16): 1923, 1924, 1925, 1926, 1929, 1930, 1932, 1934, 1936, 1937, 1938, 1940, 1957, 1958, 1990, 1991
- Torneio Início do Paraná (2): 1927, 1956

=== Runners-up ===
- Campeonato Paranaense (14): 1923, 1924, 1925, 1926, 1929, 1930, 1932, 1934, 1936, 1937, 1938, 1940, 1958, 1961
- Campeonato Paranaense Série Prata (5): 1915, 1966, 1984, 1985, 2009

== Current squad ==
As of 23 September 2026

Note: Flags indicate national team as defined under FIFA eligibility rules; some limited exceptions apply. Players may hold more than one non-FIFA nationality.

| No. | Pos. | Nation | Player |
|---|---|---|---|
| 1 | GK | BRA | Elias Curzel |
| 2 | DF | BRA | Mikael Doka (on loan from Central Coast Mariners) |
| 4 | DF | BRA | William Klaus |
| 5 | MF | BRA | Índio |
| 6 | DF | BRA | Moraes Júnior (on loan from Goiás) |
| 7 | FW | BRA | Ángel Torres (on loan from Dynamo Kyiv) |
| 8 | MF | COL | Juan Zuluaga |
| 9 | FW | BRA | Vinícius Mingotti |
| 10 | MF | BRA | Gabriel Boschilia (captain) |
| 11 | FW | BRA | Aylon |
| 12 | GK | BRA | Talles |
| 14 | FW | CPV | Berto |
| 16 | DF | BRA | Miranda |
| 20 | MF | BRA | Vinícius Diniz |
| 22 | DF | COL | José Cuenú |
| 23 | DF | BRA | João Gabriel |

| No. | Pos. | Nation | Player |
|---|---|---|---|
| 26 | DF | BRA | Maguinho |
| 27 | DF | BRA | Gabriel Feliciano |
| 28 | MF | BRA | Dudu Mosconi |
| 29 | FW | COL | Edwin Torres |
| 30 | MF | BRA | Pedro Vilhena |
| 32 | MF | BRA | Charles Raphael |
| 33 | GK | BRA | Vagner |
| 34 | DF | BRA | Renan Gustavo |
| 39 | MF | BRA | Matheus Trindade |
| 41 | GK | BRA | Diego Monteiro (on loan from São Joseense) |
| 43 | DF | BRA | Joseph |
| 77 | FW | BRA | Maxwell |
| 88 | MF | BRA | Neto Paraíba |
| 92 | FW | BRA | Pablo |
| 99 | FW | BRA | Caio Dantas |

=== Youth team ===
Note: Flags indicate national team as defined under FIFA eligibility rules; some limited exceptions apply. Players may hold more than one non-FIFA nationality.

| No. | Pos. | Nation | Player |

=== Out on loan ===
Note: Flags indicate national team as defined under FIFA eligibility rules; some limited exceptions apply. Players may hold more than one non-FIFA nationality.

| No. | Pos. | Nation | Player |
|---|---|---|---|
| — | DF | BRA | Diogo Mateus (at Botafogo PB until 30 November 2026) |
