= Londrina Esporte Clube =

Brazilian association football club based in Londrina, Paraná

Londrina
- Full name: Londrina Esporte Clube
- Nicknames: LEC; Alviceleste (The White and Sky Blue); Tubarão (Shark); Rama do Café (The Coffee Branch)
- Founded: 5 April 1956; 70 years ago
- Ground: Estádio do Café
- Capacity: 30,000
- President: Cláudio Canuto
- Head coach: Allan Aal
- League: Campeonato Brasileiro Série B Campeonato Paranaense
- 2025 2025: Série C, 2nd of 20 (promoted); Paranaense, 3rd of 12
- Website: www.londrinaesporteclube.com.br
Home colors	Away colors	Third colors

Londrina Esporte Clube, more commonly referred to as Londrina, is a Brazilian professional football club in Londrina, Paraná, which currently plays in Série B, the second tier of Brazilian football, after being promotion from Série C in 2025. They also play in the Campeonato Paranaense, the top division of the Paraná state football league.

The club was founded on April 5, 1956, and originally played at the Vitorino Gonçalves Dias stadium. Their current stadium, the Estádio do Café was built for Londrina's participation in the 1976 Brazilian league championship.

The most successful period for Londrina came between 1976 and 1982 when Londrina competed in Brazil's top league for 6 seasons. They were relegated for the 1980 season but claimed their only national league title by becoming champions of the second division. They have also won the state championship four times, as well as claiming 12 Campeonato do Interior Paranaense titles.

In 2013, Londrina finished in top place in the general classification of the Campeonato Paranaense. Although they did not qualify for the state championship final they won the Interior final and thereby qualified for a place in the Campeonato Brasileiro Série D, the fourth tier of the Brazilian league system and will also be placed in the draw for the first round of the Copa do Brasil.

== History ==
Londrina was founded by a group of sportsmen who, after watching a friendly match between Nacional and Vasco da Gama in Rolândia, decided that they did not want to go to Rolândia to watch football. Instead, they founded a club in Londrina, their own city. The club, named Londrina Futebol e Regatas, was founded on April 5, 1956. They chose blue and white to be Londrina's colors.

In 1969, Londrina Futebol e Regatas merged with Paraná Esporte Clube, founded in 1942, forming Londrina Esporte Clube. Red and white, the colors for the city of Londrina, became the new club's colors. In 1972, Carlos Antônio Franchello returned to the presidency of the club, and restored blue and white as the club's colors.

In 2008, Londrina won the Copa Paraná for the first time, after beating Cianorte in the final. The club also competed in the same season's Recopa Sul-Brasileira. Londrina was eliminated in the Recopa Sul-Brasileira in the semifinals after a penalty shootout by Brusque.

== Honours ==
=== Official tournaments ===
National
Competitions	Titles	Seasons
Campeonato Brasileiro Série B	1	1980
Inter-regional
Competitions	Titles	Seasons
Primeira Liga	1	2017
State
Competitions	Titles	Seasons
Campeonato Paranaense	5	1962, 1981, 1992, 2014, 2021
Copa Paraná	1	2008
Campeonato Paranaense Second Division	2	1999, 2015

=== Runners-up ===
- Campeonato Brasileiro Série C (2): 2015, 2025
- Campeonato Paranaense (5): 1959, 1980, 1993, 1994, 2026
- Copa Paraná (2): 1999, 2007

== Campeonato Brasileiro Série A participations ==
The club competed in the Campeonato Brasileiro Série A in 1976, 1977, 1978, 1979, 1981, 1982, and in 1986. Londrina's best campaign was in 1977, when the club finished in the fourth place.

== Stadium ==
Londrina's stadium is Estádio do Café, inaugurated in 1976, with a maximum capacity of 30,000 people. However, Vitorino Gonçalves Dias stadium, with a maximum capacity of 10,000 people is owned by Londrina, and sometimes is also used by the club.

== Players ==
=== First team squad ===
As of 15 August 2026

Note: Flags indicate national team as defined under FIFA eligibility rules; some limited exceptions apply. Players may hold more than one non-FIFA nationality.

No.	Pos.	Nation	Player
1	GK	BRA	Luan Ribeiro
2	DF	BRA	Nino Paraíba
3	MF	BRA	Victor Feitosa (on loan from Volta Redonda)
4	DF	BRA	Wallace (captain)
5	MF	BRA	Tárik
6	DF	BRA	Rafael Monteiro
7	FW	BRA	Vitinho Mota (on loan from Red Bull Bragantino)
8	MF	BRA	Lucas Marques
9	FW	BRA	Gilberto
11	FW	BRA	Pablo Dyego
12	GK	BRA	Zanella
13	DF	BRA	André Dhominique
15	DF	BRA	Gabriel Lacerda
17	MF	BRA	André Cardoso (on loan from Red Bull Bragantino)
18	MF	BRA	Juninho
20	MF	BRA	João Vitor (on loan from CSP)
21	FW	BRA	Fellipinho (on loan from Boavista)
22	DF	BRA	Artur
23	FW	BRA	William Pottker

No.	Pos.	Nation	Player
27	FW	BRA	Guilherme Cachoeira (on loan from Guarani)
28	FW	BRA	Caio Maia (on loan from Atletico Mineiro)
28	FW	BRA	Raí Nascimento
29	FW	BRA	Herbert
30	GK	BRA	Maurício Kozlinski
32	MF	BRA	João Tavares
33	DF	BRA	Kevyn Lucas
34	DF	BRA	Heron
38	MF	BRA	Geovane Meurer (on loan from Coritiba)
44	DF	BRA	Caio
55	MF	BRA	Chumbinho
57	MF	BRA	Cainã
77	FW	BRA	Guilherme Portuga (on loan from Portuguesa)
96	MF	BRA	Thalis
99	FW	BRA	Igor Bahia
—	DF	BRA	Weverton
—	MF	BRA	Fabiano
—	FW	BRA	João Andrade
—	FW	BRA	Herbert

=== Youth team ===
Note: Flags indicate national team as defined under FIFA eligibility rules; some limited exceptions apply. Players may hold more than one non-FIFA nationality.

No.	Pos.	Nation	Player
87	FW	BRA	Kauã Jonathan

=== Other players under contract ===
Note: Flags indicate national team as defined under FIFA eligibility rules; some limited exceptions apply. Players may hold more than one non-FIFA nationality.

No.	Pos.	Nation	Player
21	FW	BRA	Fabrício
—	MF	BRA	Murilo Sousa

=== Out on loan ===
Note: Flags indicate national team as defined under FIFA eligibility rules; some limited exceptions apply. Players may hold more than one non-FIFA nationality.

No.	Pos.	Nation	Player
—	DF	BRA	Guilherme Ferreira (at Ferroviária until 30 October 2026)
—	DF	BRA	Maurício Mucuri (at Fortaleza until 30 November 2026)
55	MF	BRA	Caio Rafael (at Paços de Ferreira until 30 June 2027)

No.	Pos.	Nation	Player
—	FW	BRA	Iago Teles (at Júbilo Iwata until 30 June 2027)
—	FW	BRA	Crysthyan Lucas (at Liepāja until 31 July 2027)
—	FW	BRA	João Pedro (at Paços de Ferreira until 30 June 2027)
