= 2022 Campeonato Paranaense =

Football competition in Brazil

Campeonato Paranaense
- Season: 2022
- Dates: 22 January - 3 April
- Champions: Coritiba (39th title)
- Relegated: Paraná; União
- Copa do Brasil: Coritiba; Londrina; Maringá; Operário Ferroviário; Athletico Paranaense (via 2022 Série A)
- Série D: FC Cascavel; Maringá; São Joseense
- Matches played: 80
- Goals scored: 187 (2.34 per match)
- Top goalscorer: Igor Paixão; Léo Gamalho (7 goals each)

The 2022 Campeonato Paranaense (officially the Campeonato Paranaense 1XBET 2022 for sponsorship reasons) was the 108th edition of the top division of football in the state of Paraná organized by FPF. The competition started on 22 January and ended on 3 April. Londrina were the defending champions but were eliminated in the quarter-finals.

Rio Branco could not inscribed all their players before their first match against FC Cascavel. Therefore the match, scheduled for 22 January (First stage, 1st round), was not played and FC Cascavel was awarded a 3–0 win by forfeit.

Coritiba won their 39th title after defeating Maringá 6–3 on aggregate in the finals.

== Format ==
In the first stage, each team played the other eleven teams in a single round-robin tournament. The teams were ranked according to points. If tied on points, the following criteria would be used to determine the ranking: 1. Wins; 2. Goal difference; 3. Goals scored; 4. Head-to-head results (only between two teams); 5. Fewest red cards; 6. Fewest yellow cards; 7. Draw in the headquarters of the FPF.

Top eight teams advanced to the quarter-finals of the final stages. The bottom two teams were relegated to the second division. Top three teams not already qualified for 2023 Série A, Série B or Série C qualified for 2023 Série D.

Final stage was played on a home-and-away two-legged basis, with the best overall performance team hosting the second leg. If tied on aggregate, the penalty shoot-out would be used to determine the winners. Top four teams qualified for the 2023 Copa do Brasil.

== Participating teams ==
| Club | Home city | Manager | 2020 result | Titles (last) |
|---|---|---|---|---|
| Athletico Paranaense | Curitiba | Alberto Valentim | 4th | 26 (2020) |
| Azuriz | Marmeleiro | Fabiano Daitx | 5th | 0 |
| Cianorte | Cianorte | João Burse | 6th | 0 |
| Coritiba | Curitiba | Gustavo Morínigo | 9th | 38 (2017) |
| FC Cascavel | Cascavel | Tcheco | 2nd | 0 |
| Londrina | Londrina | Adilson Batista | 1st | 5 (2021) |
| Maringá | Maringá | Jorge Castilho | 8th | 0 |
| Operário Ferroviário | Ponta Grossa | Claudinei Oliveira | 3rd | 1 (2015) |
| Paraná | Curitiba | Douglas Leite (caretaker) | 7th | 7 (2006) |
| Rio Branco | Paranaguá | Paulo Massaro | 10th | 0 |
| São Joseense | São José dos Pinhais | Marcão | 1st (Seg.) | 0 |
| União | Francisco Beltrão | Rafael Andrade | 2nd (Seg.) | 0 |

== First stage ==
| Pos | Team | Pld | W | D | L | GF | GA | GD | Pts | Qualification or relegation |
|---|---|---|---|---|---|---|---|---|---|---|
| 1 | Operário Ferroviário | 11 | 6 | 3 | 2 | 19 | 9 | +10 | 21 | Advance to Quarter-finals |
| 2 | Coritiba | 11 | 6 | 3 | 2 | 15 | 8 | +7 | 21 | Advance to Quarter-finals |
| 3 | Athletico Paranaense | 11 | 5 | 5 | 1 | 18 | 9 | +9 | 20 | Advance to Quarter-finals |
| 4 | Maringá | 11 | 6 | 1 | 4 | 12 | 10 | +2 | 19 | Advance to Quarter-finals |
| 5 | FC Cascavel | 11 | 5 | 3 | 3 | 14 | 12 | +2 | 18 | Advance to Quarter-finals |
| 6 | Londrina | 11 | 5 | 3 | 3 | 13 | 12 | +1 | 18 | Advance to Quarter-finals |
| 7 | Cianorte | 11 | 5 | 2 | 4 | 12 | 10 | +2 | 17 | Advance to Quarter-finals |
| 8 | São Joseense | 11 | 4 | 4 | 3 | 10 | 8 | +2 | 16 | Advance to Quarter-finals |
| 9 | Rio Branco | 11 | 4 | 0 | 7 | 14 | 19 | −5 | 12 | |
| 10 | Azuriz | 11 | 3 | 2 | 6 | 7 | 13 | −6 | 11 | |
| 11 | União (R) | 11 | 2 | 1 | 8 | 13 | 21 | −8 | 7 | Relegation to 2023 Campeonato Paranaense - Segunda Divisão |
| 12 | Paraná (R) | 11 | 1 | 1 | 9 | 5 | 21 | −16 | 4 | Relegation to 2023 Campeonato Paranaense - Segunda Divisão |

Source: FPF
(R) Relegated

== Final stage ==
=== Bracket ===
Quarter-finals
São Joseense | 2 | 0 | 2
Operário Ferroviário | 1 | 2 | 3
FC Cascavel | 0 | 0 | 0
Maringá | 1 | 5 | 6
Londrina | 1 | 1 | 2 (2)
Athletico Paranaense (p) | 0 | 2 | 2 (4)
Cianorte | 0 | 0 | 0
Coritiba | 1 | 3 | 4

Semi-finals
Operário Ferroviário | 1 | 0 | 1 (3)
Maringá (p) | 1 | 0 | 1 (5)
Athletico Paranaense | 1 | 1 | 2
Coritiba | 2 | 1 | 3

Finals
Maringá | 1 | 2 | 3
Coritiba | 2 | 4 | 6

=== Quarter-finals ===
| Team 1 | Agg. | Team 2 | 1st leg | 2nd leg |
|---|---|---|---|---|
| São Joseense | 2–3 | Operário Ferroviário | 2–1 | 0–2 |
| Cianorte | 0–4 | Coritiba | 0–1 | 0–3 |
| Londrina | 2–2 (2–4 p) | Athletico Paranaense | 1–0 | 1–2 |
| FC Cascavel | 0–6 | Maringá | 0–1 | 0–5 |

==== Group A ====
13 March 2022
15:30

| São Joseense | 2–1 | Operário Ferroviário |
|---|---|---|
| Alisson Taddei 17'; Bruno Oliveira 35' | Report | Lucas Mendes 87' |

Estádio do Pinhão, São José dos Pinhais
Attendance: 782
Referee: André Ricardo Martins

19 March 2022
18:30

| Operário Ferroviário | 2–0 | São Joseense |
|---|---|---|
| Leandro Vilela 45+1'; Rafael Chorão 74' | Report |

Estádio Germano Krüger, Ponta Grossa
Attendance: 2,479
Referee: José Mendonça da Silva Júnior

Operário Ferroviário qualified for the semi-finals.

==== Group B ====
13 March 2022
18:30

| Cianorte | 0–1 | Coritiba |
|---|---|---|
| | Report | Léo Gamalho 20' |

Estádio Municipal Olímpico Albino Turbay, Cianorte
Attendance: 753
Referee: Cristian Eduardo Gorski da Luz

19 March 2022
16:00

| Coritiba | 3–0 | Cianorte |
|---|---|---|
| Egídio 46'; Léo Gamalho 60', 77' | Report |

Estádio Couto Pereira, Curitiba
Attendance: 7,614
Referee: Robson Babinski

Coritiba qualified for the semi-finals.

==== Group C ====
13 March 2022
11:00

| Londrina | 1–0 | Athletico Paranaense |
|---|---|---|
| Eltinho 10' | Report |

Estádio do Café, Londrina
Attendance: 1,542
Referee: Leonardo Ferreira Lima

20 March 2022
16:00

| Athletico Paranaense | 2–1 | Londrina |
|---|---|---|
| Davi Araújo 33'; Terans 83' | Report | Augusto 85' |
Penalties
| Pablo (penalty scored); Bissoli (penalty scored); Terans (penalty scored); Rômulo (penalty scored) | 4–2 | (penalty scored) João Paulo; (penalty missed) Luan Marchiori; (penalty scored) Augusto; (penalty missed) Salatiel |

Arena da Baixada, Curitiba
Attendance: 13,487
Referee: Rodolpho Toski Marques

Athletico Paranaense qualified for the semi-finals.

==== Group D ====
12 March 2022
18:30

| FC Cascavel | 0–1 | Maringá |
|---|---|---|
| | Report | Mirandinha 71' |

Estádio Olímpico Regional Arnaldo Busatto, Cascavel
Attendance: 4,795
Referee: Luiz Alexandre Fernandes

20 March 2022
18:30

| Maringá | 5–0 | FC Cascavel |
|---|---|---|
| Felipe Saraiva 14' (pen.), 40'; Vilar 42'; Mirandinha 60'; Ronald 66' | Report |

Estádio Willie Davids, Maringá
Attendance: 8,904
Referee: Lucas Paulo Torezin

Maringá qualified for the semi-finals.

=== Semi-finals ===
| Team 1 | Agg. | Team 2 | 1st leg | 2nd leg |
|---|---|---|---|---|
| Operário Ferroviário | 1–1 (3–5 p) | Maringá | 1–1 | 0–0 |
| Athletico Paranaense | 2–3 | Coritiba | 1–2 | 1–1 |

==== Group E ====
24 March 2022
20:00

| Operário Ferroviário | 1–1 | Maringá |
|---|---|---|
| Rodrigo Pimpão 68' | Report | Ronald 61' |

Estádio Germano Krüger, Ponta Grossa
Attendance: 2,014
Referee: Luiz Alexandre Fernandes

27 March 2022
18:00

| Maringá | 0–0 | Operário Ferroviário |
|---|---|---|
| | Report |
Penalties
| Felipe Saraiva (penalty scored); Robertinho (penalty scored); Anderson Ceará (penalty scored); Brito (penalty scored); Ronald (penalty scored) | 5–3 | (penalty scored) Paulo Sérgio; (penalty scored) Thomaz; (penalty scored) Rafael Chorão; (penalty missed) Fernando Neto |

Estádio Willie Davids, Maringá
Attendance: 12,540
Referee: José Mendonça da Silva Júnior

Maringá qualified for the finals.

==== Group F ====
23 March 2022
20:00

| Athletico Paranaense | 1–2 | Coritiba |
|---|---|---|
| Terans 15' | Report | Alef Manga 10', 43' |

Arena da Baixada, Curitiba
Attendance: 21,373
Referee: Lucas Paulo Torezin

27 March 2022
16:00

| Coritiba | 1–1 | Athletico Paranaense |
|---|---|---|
| Alef Manga 35' | Report | Pablo 57' (pen.) |

Estádio Couto Pereira, Curitiba
Attendance: 20,934
Referee: Lucas Paulo Torezin

Coritiba qualified for the finals.

=== Finals ===
| Team 1 | Agg. | Team 2 | 1st leg | 2nd leg |
|---|---|---|---|---|
| Maringá | 3–6 | Coritiba | 1–2 | 2–4 |

==== Group G ====
30 March 2022
20:00

| Maringá | 1–2 | Coritiba |
|---|---|---|
| Alemão 30' | Report | Léo Gamalho 65'; Igor Paixão 70' |

Estádio Willie Davids, Maringá
Attendance: 11,752
Referee: Leonardo Ferreira Lima

| Maringá | Coritiba |

| GK | 1 | (Brazil) Dheimison |
| DF | 28 | (Brazil) Marcos Vinícius |
| DF | 14 | (Brazil) Ronald | (yellow card) 39' |
| DF | 4 | (Brazil) Vilar |
| DF | 16 | (Brazil) Raphinha |
| MF | 18 | (Brazil) Matheus Bianqui |
| MF | 15 | (Brazil) Parrudo (c) | | (substituted off) 82' |
| MF | 5 | (Brazil) João Denoni |
| FW | 7 | (Brazil) Mirandinha | | (substituted off) 87' |
| FW | 8 | (Brazil) Alemão | (yellow card) 45+1' | (substituted off) 74' |
| FW | 11 | (Brazil) Felipe Saraiva | | (substituted off) 87' |
Substitutes:
| GK | 12 | (Brazil) Guilherme Neto |
| DF | 2 | (Brazil) Matheus Rocha |
| DF | 3 | (Brazil) Felipe Macedo |
| DF | 13 | (Brazil) Áquila |
| MF | 21 | (Brazil) Guilherme Castro | | (substituted in) 82' |
| MF | 32 | (Brazil) Bruno Luiz |
| MF | 34 | (Brazil) Anderson Ceará |
| MF | 35 | (Brazil) Brito |
| FW | 10 | (Brazil) Robertinho | | (substituted in) 74' |
| FW | 17 | (Brazil) David Ribeiro | | (substituted in) 87' |
| FW | 27 | (Brazil) Lucão | | (substituted in) 87' |
| FW | 29 | (Brazil) Rian |
Coach:
(Brazil) Jorge Castilho

| GK | 23 | (Brazil) Alex Muralha |
| DF | 17 | (Brazil) Warley | | (substituted off) 82' |
| DF | 5 | (Uruguay) Guillermo de los Santos |
| DF | 4 | (Brazil) Luciano Castán |
| DF | 18 | (Brazil) Guilherme Biro | (yellow card) 33' |
| MF | 36 | (Brazil) Matheus Sales | | (substituted off) 69' |
| MF | 97 | (Brazil) Val | (yellow card) 55' | (substituted off) 82' |
| MF | 20 | (Brazil) Robinho (c) | | (substituted off) 69' |
| FW | 98 | (Brazil) Igor Paixão |
| FW | 11 | (Brazil) Alef Manga | | (substituted off) 87' |
| FW | 9 | (Brazil) Léo Gamalho |
Substitutes:
| GK | 21 | (Brazil) Rafael William |
| DF | 2 | (Brazil) Matheus Alexandre | | (substituted in) 82' |
| DF | 6 | (Brazil) Egídio | | (substituted in) 87' |
| DF | 14 | (Brazil) Thalisson Gabriel |
| DF | 44 | (Brazil) Márcio Silva |
| MF | 7 | (Brazil) Andrey | | (substituted in) 69' |
| MF | 19 | (Brazil) Thonny Anderson | | (substituted in) 69' |
| MF | 25 | (Brazil) Bernardo | | (substituted in) 82' |
| MF | 78 | (Brazil) Régis |
| MF | 88 | (Brazil) Gustavo Bochecha |
| FW | 70 | (Brazil) Neilton |
| FW | 99 | (Brazil) Clayton |
Coach:
(Paraguay) Gustavo Morínigo

Assistant referees:
Wagner Júnior Bonfim Ledo
Bruno Fernando Aparecido Rohling
Fourth official:
Murilo Ugolini Klein
Fifth official:
Ideidy Henrique Costa

3 April 2022
16:00

| Coritiba | 4–2 | Maringá |
|---|---|---|
| Alef Manga 46'; Igor Paixão 49', 53'; Léo Gamalho 85' | Report | Matheus Bianqui 15'; Gui Sales 77' |

Estádio Couto Pereira, Curitiba
Attendance: 27,655
Referee: Lucas Paulo Torezin

| Coritiba | Maringá |

| GK | 23 | (Brazil) Alex Muralha |
| DF | 17 | (Brazil) Warley |
| DF | 3 | (Brazil) Henrique |
| DF | 4 | (Brazil) Luciano Castán |
| DF | 6 | (Brazil) Egídio | (substituted off) 76' |
| MF | 8 | (Brazil) Willian Farias (c) | (substituted off) 76' |
| MF | 7 | (Brazil) Andrey |
| MF | 19 | (Brazil) Thonny Anderson | (substituted off) 71' |
| FW | 98 | (Brazil) Igor Paixão |
| FW | 9 | (Brazil) Léo Gamalho | (substituted off) 86' |
| FW | 11 | (Brazil) Alef Manga | (substituted off) 76' |
Substitutes:
| GK | 21 | (Brazil) Rafael William |
| DF | 2 | (Brazil) Matheus Alexandre |
| DF | 5 | (Uruguay) Guillermo de los Santos | (substituted in) 76' |
| DF | 18 | (Brazil) Guilherme Biro | (substituted in) 76' |
| DF | 44 | (Brazil) Márcio Silva |
| MF | 20 | (Brazil) Robinho | (substituted in) 71' |
| MF | 25 | (Brazil) Bernardo |
| MF | 36 | (Brazil) Matheus Sales |
| MF | 78 | (Brazil) Régis |
| MF | 97 | (Brazil) Val | (substituted in) 76' |
| FW | 70 | (Brazil) Neilton |
| FW | 99 | (Brazil) Clayton | (substituted in) 86' |
Coach:
(Paraguay) Gustavo Morínigo

| GK | 1 | (Brazil) Dheimison |
| DF | 28 | (Brazil) Marcos Vinícius | (yellow card) 53' |
| DF | 14 | (Brazil) Ronald | (yellow card) 21' |
| DF | 4 | (Brazil) Vilar |
| DF | 16 | (Brazil) Raphinha |
| MF | 18 | (Brazil) Matheus Bianqui |
| MF | 15 | (Brazil) Parrudo (c) | | (substituted off) 67' |
| MF | 5 | (Brazil) João Denoni | | (substituted off) 86' |
| FW | 7 | (Brazil) Mirandinha | | (substituted off) 75' |
| FW | 8 | (Brazil) Alemão | | (substituted off) 75' |
| FW | 11 | (Brazil) Felipe Saraiva | | (substituted off) 86' |
Substitutes:
| GK | 12 | (Brazil) Guilherme Neto |
| DF | 2 | (Brazil) Matheus Rocha |
| DF | 3 | (Brazil) Felipe Macedo |
| MF | 21 | (Brazil) Guilherme Castro | | (substituted in) 86' |
| MF | 32 | (Brazil) Bruno Luiz |
| MF | 34 | (Brazil) Anderson Ceará |
| MF | 35 | (Brazil) Brito | | (substituted in) 86' |
| FW | 10 | (Brazil) Robertinho | | (substituted in) 67' |
| FW | 17 | (Brazil) David Ribeiro | | (substituted in) 75' |
| FW | 19 | (Brazil) Gui Sales | | (substituted in) 75' |
| FW | 29 | (Brazil) Rian |
Coach:
(Brazil) Jorge Castilho

Assistant referees:
Ivan Carlos Bohn
Victor Hugo Imazu dos Santos
Fourth official:
Robson Babinski
Fifth official:
Denise Akemi Simões de Oliveira

== Overall table ==
| Pos | Team | Pld | W | D | L | GF | GA | GD | Pts | Qualification or relegation |
|---|---|---|---|---|---|---|---|---|---|---|
| 1 | Coritiba | 17 | 11 | 4 | 2 | 28 | 13 | +15 | 37 | Champions and 2023 Copa do Brasil |
| 2 | Maringá | 17 | 8 | 3 | 6 | 22 | 17 | +5 | 27 | Runners-up, 2023 Copa do Brasil and 2023 Série D |
| 3 | Operário Ferroviário | 15 | 7 | 5 | 3 | 23 | 12 | +11 | 26 | 2023 Copa do Brasil |
| 4 | Athletico Paranaense (Note: Athletico Paranaense qualified for the Copa do Brasil via 2022 Campeonato Brasileiro Série A.) | 15 | 6 | 6 | 3 | 22 | 14 | +8 | 24 | 2023 Copa do Brasil |
| 5 | Londrina | 13 | 6 | 3 | 4 | 15 | 14 | +1 | 21 | 2023 Copa do Brasil |
| 6 | São Joseense | 13 | 5 | 4 | 4 | 12 | 11 | +1 | 19 | 2023 Série D |
| 7 | FC Cascavel | 13 | 5 | 3 | 5 | 14 | 18 | −4 | 18 | 2023 Série D |
| 8 | Cianorte | 13 | 5 | 2 | 6 | 12 | 14 | −2 | 17 | |
| 9 | Rio Branco | 11 | 4 | 0 | 7 | 14 | 19 | −5 | 12 | |
| 10 | Azuriz | 11 | 3 | 2 | 6 | 7 | 13 | −6 | 11 | |
| 11 | União | 11 | 2 | 1 | 8 | 13 | 21 | −8 | 7 | Relegation to 2023 Campeonato Paranaense - Segunda Divisão |
| 12 | Paraná | 11 | 1 | 1 | 9 | 5 | 21 | −16 | 4 | Relegation to 2023 Campeonato Paranaense - Segunda Divisão |

Source: FPF

== Top goalscorers ==
| Rank | Player | Team | Goals |
|---|---|---|---|
| 1 | Igor Paixão | Coritiba | 7 |
| 1 | Léo Gamalho | Coritiba | 7 |
| 3 | Alef Manga | Coritiba | 6 |
| 3 | Rômulo | Athletico Paranaense | 6 |
| 5 | Marcelo | Operário Ferroviário | 5 |
| 6 | Alemão | Maringá | 4 |
| 6 | Caprini | Londrina | 4 |
| 6 | Douglas Coutinho | Londrina | 4 |
| 6 | Paulo Sérgio | Operário Ferroviário | 4 |
| 6 | Robinho | FC Cascavel | 4 |
