= 2021 Campeonato Paranaense =

Football division

Campeonato Paranaense
- Season: 2021
- Dates: 27 February - 13 October
- Champions: Londrina (5th title)
- Relegated: Cascavel CR; Toledo
- Copa do Brasil: Azuriz; FC Cascavel; Londrina; Operário Ferroviário; Athletico Paranaense (via Copa Sudamericana)
- Série D: Azuriz; Cianorte; FC Cascavel
- Matches: 80
- Goals: 178 (2.23 per match)
- Top goalscorer: Rodrigo Bassani (7 goals)

The 2021 Campeonato Paranaense (officially the Campeonato Paranaense de Futebol Profissional da 1ª Divisão - Temporada 2021) was the 107th edition of the top division of football in the state of Paraná organized by FPF. The competition started on 27 February and ended on 13 October.

FPF suspended the second and third rounds scheduled for the first two weeks of March due to the COVID-19 pandemic in Brazil. The tournament resumed on 11 March. Athletico Paranaense were the defending champions but were eliminated in the semi-finals.

On 14 March, FC Cascavel fielded, against Paraná, the goalkeeper João Pedro. As João Pedro had not a professional contract, he was an ineligible player. Due to this, FC Cascavel were deducted six points and sanctioned with a fine of R$1,000 after they were punished, on 26 April, by Tribunal de Justiça Desportiva do Paraná (TJD–PR).

On 22 April four players of Cascavel CR were stopped from playing against Athletico Paranaense because of suspicions they had attempted to falsify their COVID-19 tests. FPF started an investigation after a laboratory reported that the players had not taken their COVID-19 tests on the due dates. Originally, on 5 May, Cascavel CR were suspended for 180 days and sanctioned with a fine of R$20,000, however, after an appeal, TJD–PR increased the suspension to 720 days and the fine to R$200,000. Despite their suspension, Cascavel CR was cleared by Supremo Tribunal de Justiça Desportiva to play the last round of the first stage against Maringá.

Tied 2–2 on aggregate, Londrina won their 5th title after defeating FC Cascavel on penalties.

== Format ==
In the first stage, each team played the other eleven teams in a single round-robin tournament. The teams were ranked according to points. If tied on points, the following criteria would be used to determine the ranking: 1. Wins; 2. Goal difference; 3. Goals scored; 4. Head-to-head results (only between two teams); 5. Fewest red cards; 6. Fewest yellow cards; 7. Draw in the headquarters of the FPF.

Top eight teams advanced to the quarter-finals of the final stages. The bottom two teams were relegated to the second division. Top three teams not already qualified for 2022 Série A, Série B or Série C qualified for 2022 Série D.

Final stage was played on a home-and-away two-legged basis, with the best overall performance team hosting the second leg. If tied on aggregate, the penalty shoot-out would be used to determine the winners. Top four teams qualified for the 2022 Copa do Brasil.

== Participating teams ==
Club	Home city	2020 result	Titles (last)
Athletico Paranaense	Curitiba	1st	26 (2020)
Azuriz	Marmeleiro	1st (Seg.)	0
Cascavel CR	Cascavel	9th	0
Cianorte	Cianorte	4th	0
Coritiba	Curitiba	2nd	38 (2017)
FC Cascavel	Cascavel	3rd	0
Londrina	Londrina	6th	4 (2014)
Maringá	Maringá	2nd (Seg.)	0
Operário Ferroviário	Ponta Grossa	5th	1 (2015)
Paraná	Curitiba	8th	7 (2006)
Rio Branco	Paranaguá	7th	0
Toledo	Toledo	10th	0

== First stage ==
Pos	Team	Pld	W	D	L	GF	GA	GD	Pts	Qualification or relegation
1	Operário Ferroviário	11	7	2	2	21	3	+18	23	Advance to Quarter-finals
2	FC Cascavel (Note: FC Cascavel were deducted six points.)	11	6	5	0	16	9	+7	17	Advance to Quarter-finals
3	Athletico Paranaense	11	5	1	5	13	14	−1	16	Advance to Quarter-finals
4	Cianorte	11	4	4	3	10	10	0	16	Advance to Quarter-finals
5	Londrina	11	3	7	1	14	9	+5	16	Advance to Quarter-finals
6	Paraná	11	4	3	4	10	12	−2	15	Advance to Quarter-finals
7	Maringá	11	3	6	2	18	11	+7	15	Advance to Quarter-finals
8	Azuriz	11	3	6	2	9	6	+3	15	Advance to Quarter-finals
9	Coritiba	11	4	2	5	19	13	+6	14	
10	Rio Branco	11	2	5	4	6	11	−5	11	
11	Toledo (R)	11	2	2	7	5	16	−11	8	Relegation to 2022 Campeonato Paranaense - Segunda Divisão
12	Cascavel CR (Note: Cascavel CR were suspended two years and relegated to the third division.) (R)	11	1	1	9	11	38	−27	4	Relegation to 2023 Campeonato Paranaense - Terceira Divisão

Source: FPF
(R) Relegated

== Final stage ==
=== Bracket ===
Quarter-finals
5	Londrina	1	3	4
4	Cianorte	1	0	1
8	Azuriz	1	0	1 (3)
1	Operário Ferroviário (p)	0	1	1 (4)
6	Paraná	0	0	0
3	Athletico Paranaense	2	0	2
7	Maringá	1	1	2
2	FC Cascavel	2	1	3

Semi-finals
5	Londrina	1	1	2
1	Operário Ferroviário	0	1	1
3	Athletico Paranaense	1	1	2
2	FC Cascavel	1	2	3

Finals
5	Londrina	1	1	2 (6)
2	FC Cascavel	1	1	2 (5)

=== Quarter-finals ===
Team 1	Agg.	Team 2	1st leg	2nd leg
Azuriz	1–1 (3–4 p)	Operário Ferroviário	1–0	0–1
Maringá	2–3	FC Cascavel	1–2	1–1
Paraná	0–2	Athletico Paranaense	0–2	0–0
Londrina	4–1	Cianorte	1–1	3–0

==== Group A ====
17 May 2021
14:00

Azuriz	1–0	Operário Ferroviário
Ednei 26'	Report

Estádio Os Pioneiros, Pato Branco
Attendance: 0
Referee: Robson Babinski

20 May 2021
16:00

Operário Ferroviário	1–0	Azuriz
Djalma Silva 8'	Report
Penalties
Ricardo Bueno (penalty scored); Rodolfo Filemon (penalty scored); Djalma Silva (penalty scored); Rafael Oller (penalty scored); Tomas Bastos (penalty missed)	4–3	(penalty scored) Lucas Vieira; (penalty scored) Igor Bosel; (penalty scored) Vinícius Guarapuava; (penalty missed) Fábio; (penalty missed) Bedoya

Estádio Germano Krüger, Ponta Grossa
Attendance: 0
Referee: Leonardo Sígari Zanon

Operário Ferroviário qualified for the semi-finals.

==== Group B ====
17 May 2021
14:00

Maringá	1–2	FC Cascavel
Gustavo Vilar 15'	Report	Robinho 19'; Léo Itaperuna 78'

Estádio Willie Davids, Maringá
Attendance: 0
Referee: Rodolpho Toski Marques

20 May 2021
16:00

FC Cascavel	1–1	Maringá
Robinho 73' (pen.)	Report	Mirandinha 74'

Estádio Olímpico Regional Arnaldo Busatto, Cascavel
Attendance: 0
Referee: Adriano Milczvski

FC Cascavel qualified for the semi-finals.

==== Group C ====
24 May 2021
15:20

Paraná	0–2	Athletico Paranaense
	Report	Matheus Babi 54'; Léo Cittadini 66'

Estádio Vila Capanema, Curitiba
Attendance: 0
Referee: Paulo Roberto Alves Júnior

16 June 2021
15:20

Athletico Paranaense	0–0	Paraná
	Report

Arena da Baixada, Curitiba
Attendance: 0
Referee: Lucas Paulo Torezin

Athletico Paranaense qualified for the semi-finals.

==== Group D ====
17 May 2021
14:00

Londrina	1–1	Cianorte
Douglas Santos 28'	Report	Pachu 68'

Estádio do Café, Londrina
Attendance: 0
Referee: Luiz Alexandre Fernandes

20 May 2021
16:00

Cianorte	0–3	Londrina
	Report	Safira 11'; Salatiel 22'; Douglas Santos 24'

Estádio Municipal Olímpico Albino Turbay, Cianorte
Attendance: 0
Referee: Leonardo Ferreira Lima

Londrina qualified for the semi-finals.

=== Semi-finals ===
Team 1	Agg.	Team 2	1st leg	2nd leg
Londrina	2–1	Operário Ferroviário	1–0	1–1
Athletico Paranaense	2–3	FC Cascavel	1–1	1–2

==== Group E ====
9 June 2021
16:00

Londrina	1–0	Operário Ferroviário
Danilo 84'	Report

Estádio do Café, Londrina
Attendance: 0
Referee: Murilo Ugolini Klein

6 July 2021
15:20

Operário Ferroviário	1–1	Londrina
Felipe Garcia 87'	Report	Salatiel 62'

Estádio Germano Krüger, Ponta Grossa
Attendance: 0
Referee: Rodolpho Toski Marques

Londrina qualified for the finals.

==== Group F ====
1 September 2021
15:20

Athletico Paranaense	1–1	FC Cascavel
Erick 90+2'	Report	Robinho 90+5' (pen.)

Arena da Baixada, Curitiba
Attendance: 0
Referee: Leonardo Sígari Zanon

8 September 2021
15:20

FC Cascavel	2–1	Athletico Paranaense
Leichtweis 47'; Léo Itaperuna 64'	Report	Nikão 5'

Estádio Olímpico Regional Arnaldo Busatto, Cascavel
Attendance: 0
Referee: Leonardo Ferreira Lima

FC Cascavel qualified for the semi-finals.

=== Finals ===
Team 1	Agg.	Team 2	1st leg	2nd leg
Londrina	2–2 (6–5 p)	FC Cascavel	1–1	1–1

==== Group G ====
6 October 2021
15:20

Londrina	1–1	FC Cascavel
Victor Daniel 13'	Report	João Pedro 90+4'

Estádio do Café, Londrina
Attendance: 234
Referee: Murilo Ugolini Klein

13 October 2021
15:20

FC Cascavel	1–1	Londrina
Willian Gomes 45+4'	Report	Victor Daniel 70'
Penalties
João Pedro (penalty scored); Willian Gomes (penalty scored); Robinho (penalty scored); Wilian Simões (penalty missed); Ricardo Ernesto (penalty scored); Leichtweis (penalty scored); Carlinhos (penalty missed)	5–6	(penalty scored) Celsinho; (penalty scored) Danilo; (penalty scored) Jean Henrique; (penalty scored) Felipe Vieira; (penalty missed) Salatiel; (penalty scored) Dalton; (penalty scored) Augusto

Estádio Olímpico Regional Arnaldo Busatto, Cascavel
Attendance: 2,774
Referee: Lucas Paulo Torezin

== Overall table ==
Pos	Team	Pld	W	D	L	GF	GA	GD	Pts	Qualification or relegation
1	Londrina	17	5	11	1	22	13	+9	26	Champions and 2022 Copa do Brasil
2	FC Cascavel (Note: FC Cascavel were deducted six points.)	17	8	9	0	24	15	+9	27	Runners-up, 2022 Copa do Brasil and 2022 Série D
3	Operário Ferroviário	15	8	3	4	23	6	+17	27	2022 Copa do Brasil (Note: Athletico Paranaense qualified for the 2022 Copa do Brasil by winning the 2021 Copa Sudamericana.)
4	Athletico Paranaense	15	6	3	6	17	17	0	21	2022 Copa do Brasil
5	Azuriz	13	4	6	3	10	7	+3	18	2022 Copa do Brasil and 2022 Série D
6	Cianorte	13	4	5	4	11	14	−3	17	2022 Série D
7	Paraná	13	4	4	5	10	14	−4	16	
8	Maringá	13	3	7	3	20	14	+6	16	
9	Coritiba	11	4	2	5	19	13	+6	14	
10	Rio Branco	11	2	5	4	6	11	−5	11	
11	Toledo	11	2	2	7	5	16	−11	8	Relegation to 2022 Campeonato Paranaense - Segunda Divisão
12	Cascavel CR (Note: Cascavel CR were suspended two years and relegated to the third division.)	11	1	1	9	11	38	−27	4	Relegation to 2023 Campeonato Paranaense - Terceira Divisão

Source: FPF

== Top goalscorers ==
No.	Player	Club	Goals
1	Rodrigo Bassani	Maringá	7
2	Pachu	Cianorte	6
2	Robinho	FC Cascavel	6
4	Léo Itaperuna	FC Cascavel	5
4	Safira	Londrina	5
6	Felipe Garcia	Operário Ferroviário	4
6	Léo Gamalho	Coritiba	4
6	Lucas Vieira	Azuriz	4
