= 2024 Avaí FC season =

Avaí
2024 season
- Manager: Enderson Moreira
- Stadium: Ressacada
- Série B: 5th
- Campeonato Catarinense: Semi-finals
colours	Away colours	Third colours

The 2024 season is Avaí's 102nd in existence. They will play in the Série B and the Campeonato Catarinense.

== Players ==
=== First-team squad ===
As of 21 August 2024

Note: Flags indicate national team as defined under FIFA eligibility rules; some limited exceptions apply. Players may hold more than one non-FIFA nationality.

No.	Pos.	Nation	Player
1	GK	BRA	Igor Bohn
2	DF	BRA	Kevin (on loan from Tombense)
3	DF	BRA	Tiago Pagnussat
4	DF	BRA	Roberto
5	DF	BRA	Alan Costa
6	MF	BRA	Willian Maranhão
7	FW	BRA	Hygor
8	MF	BRA	Giovanni
9	FW	BRA	Vágner Love
10	FW	BRA	William Pottker
11	FW	BRA	Maurício Garcez
14	DF	BRA	Gustavo Vilar (on loan from Maringá)
19	MF	BRA	João Paulo
20	FW	BRA	Gaspar
21	MF	BRA	Pedro Castro
22	GK	BRA	Douglas Friedrich
23	DF	BRA	João Pedro

No.	Pos.	Nation	Player
25	DF	BRA	Natanael
27	FW	BRA	Pedrinho (on loan from Ceará)
28	MF	BRA	Ronaldo Henrique
29	MF	BRA	Jean Lucas
30	MF	BRA	Gabriel Dias
31	GK	BRA	César Augusto
33	DF	BRA	Mário Sérgio
63	DF	BRA	Marcos Vinícius (on loan from Maringá)
66	GK	BRA	Otávio
71	GK	BRA	Marcão
77	MF	BRA	Zé Ricardo
80	FW	BRA	Gabriel Barros (on loan from Internacional)
82	DF	BRA	Gustavo Talles (on loan from Portuguesa)
89	FW	BRA	Cassiano
93	MF	BRA	Judson
95	DF	BRA	Jonathan Costa
99	FW	BRA	Ademilson

=== Youth team ===
Note: Flags indicate national team as defined under FIFA eligibility rules; some limited exceptions apply. Players may hold more than one non-FIFA nationality.

No.	Pos.	Nation	Player
69	MF	BRA	Favero

=== Out on loan ===
Note: Flags indicate national team as defined under FIFA eligibility rules; some limited exceptions apply. Players may hold more than one non-FIFA nationality.

No.	Pos.	Nation	Player
—	GK	BRA	João Vitor (at Blumenau until 30 August 2024)
—	MF	BRA	Andrey (at Náutico until 30 November 2024)

No.	Pos.	Nation	Player
—	FW	BRA	Gustavo Simões (at Sampaio Corrêa until 30 November 2024)

== Competitions ==
=== Overall record ===
Competition	First match	Last match	Starting round	Final position	Record							
Competition	First match	Last match	Starting round	Final position	Pld	W	D	L	GF	GA	GD	Win %
Série B	19 April 2024	November 2024	Matchday 1		37	13	11	13	32	31	+1	35.14
Campeonato Catarinense	21 January 2024	23 March 2024		Quarter-finals	7	3	2	2	9	6	+3	42.86
Total					44	16	13	15	41	37	+4	36.36

Last updated: 31 August 2024
Source: [ Soccerway]

=== Série B ===
==== League table ====
Pos	Team	Pld	W	D	L	GF	GA	GD	Pts
8	América Mineiro	38	15	13	10	50	35	+15	58
9	Vila Nova	38	16	7	15	42	54	−12	55
10	Avaí	38	14	11	13	34	32	+2	53
11	Amazonas	38	14	10	14	31	37	−6	52
12	Coritiba	38	14	8	16	41	44	−3	50

Source: CBF
Rules for classification: 1) points; 2) wins; 3) goal difference; 4) goals scored; 5) head-to-head results (only between 2 teams); 6) fewest red cards; 7) fewest yellow cards; 8) drawing of lots.

==== Results summary ====
Overall								Home						Away					
Pld	W	D	L	GF	GA	GD	Pts	W	D	L	GF	GA	GD	W	D	L	GF	GA	GD
0	0	0	0	0	0	0	0	0	0	0	0	0	0	0	0	0	0	0	0

Last updated: 31 August 2024.

==== Results by round ====
Round	1
Ground	
Result	
Position	

Updated to match(es) played on 31 August 2024. Source:
A = Away; H = Home; W = Win; D = Draw; L = Loss

==== Matches ====
The match schedule was released on 6 March.

20 April 2024 1	Operário Ferroviário	1–0	Avaí
21:00 UTC−3

26 April 2024 2	Avaí	0–2	Santos
21:00 UTC−3

3 May 2024 3	Paysandu	0–0	Avaí
21:00 UTC−3

11 May 2024 4	Avaí	1–0	Coritiba
21:00 UTC−3

14 May 2024 5	Avaí	2–1	CRB
21:00 UTC−3

18 May 2024 6	Sport	1–2	Avaí
21:00 UTC−3

27 May 2024 7	Avaí	2–0	Goiás
21:00 UTC−3

2 June 2024 8	Ituano	0–1	Avaí
21:00 UTC−3

9 June 2024 9	Avaí	0–0	Chapecoense
21:00 UTC−3

14 June 2024 10	Avaí	3–2	Guarani
21:00 UTC−3

19 June 2024 11	Brusque	0–0	Avaí
21:00 UTC−3

25 June 2024 12	América Mineiro	1–1	Avaí
21:00 UTC−3

30 June 2024 13	Avaí	1–1	Amazonas
21:00 UTC−3

8 July 2024 14	Avaí	0–1	Novorizontino
21:00 UTC−3

14 July 2024 15	Vila Nova	2–1	Avaí
21:00 UTC−3

19 July 2024 16	Avaí	0–1	Ceará
21:00 UTC−3

23 July 2024 17	Mirassol	0–0	Avaí
21:00 UTC−3

30 July 2024 18	Avaí	1–1	Botafogo-SP
21:00 UTC−3

4 August 2024 19	Ponte Preta	1–0	Avaí
21:00 UTC−3

9 August 2024 20	Avaí	1–0	Operário Ferroviário
21:00 UTC−3

17 August 2024 21	Santos	0–1	Avaí
21:00 UTC−3

22 August 2024 22	Avaí	1–0	Paysandu
21:00 UTC−3

27 August 2024 23	Coritiba	1–0	Avaí
21:00 UTC−3

31 August 2024 24	CRB	1–2	Avaí
21:00 UTC−3

=== Campeonato Catarinense ===
24 February 2024	Avaí	0–1	Brusque	Florianópolis
16:30 UTC−3				Stadium: Estádio da Ressacada

28 February 2024	Avaí	1–0	Barra	Florianópolis
19:00 UTC−3				Stadium: Estádio da Ressacada

2 March 2024	Concórdia	0–1	Avaí
16:30 UTC−3

==== Quarter-finals ====
9 March 2024 First leg	Joinville	1–1	Avaí
16:30 UTC−3

16 March 2024 Second leg	Avaí	4–0 (5–1 agg.)	Joinville	Florianópolis
16:30 UTC−3				Stadium: Estádio da Ressacada

==== Semi-finals ====
20 March 2024 First leg	Brusque	2–0	Avaí
21:00 UTC−3

23 March 2024 Second leg	Avaí	2–2 (2–4 agg.)	Brusque	Brusque
21:00 UTC−3				Stadium: Estádio Augusto Bauer
