= Jorge Castilho =

Brazilian football coach and former player (born 1971)

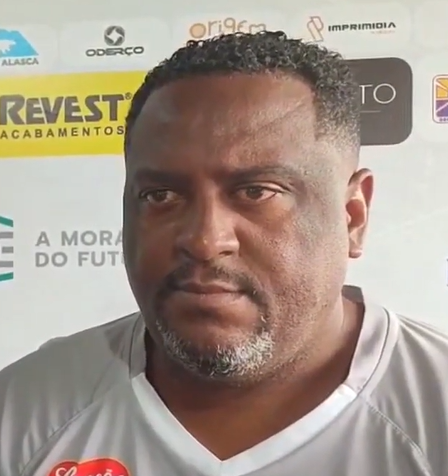
- Castilho in 2023

Personal information
- Full name: Jorge Luiz Fernandes Castilho
- Date of birth: 6 April 1982 (age 44)
- Place of birth: Guarujá, Brazil
- Position: Centre-back

Team information
- Current team: Água Santa (head coach)

Youth career
- 1992–1996: Santa Rosa-SP
- 1996: América Mineiro
- 1997–1999: Villa Nova
- 1999–2000: Guarujá
- 2000: Real de Caeté
- 2001: Guarujá

Senior career*
| Years | Team | Apps | (Gls) |
| 2001–2002 | VOCEM | | |

Managerial career
- 2011: Guarujá (youth)
- 2011: Guarujá (interim)
- 2012: Portuguesa Santista U17
- 2013: São Vicente U20 (assistant)
- 2014: Guarujá
- 2018: Guarujá (assistant)
- 2020: Maringá (assistant)
- 2020: Maringá
- 2021: Maringá (assistant)
- 2021–2022: Maringá
- 2022: Ipatinga
- 2023–2025: Maringá
- 2026: Uberlândia
- 2026: São José-SP
- 2026–: Água Santa
- * Club domestic league appearances and goals

Jorge Luiz Fernandes Castilho (born 6 April 1982), sometimes known as Buiú, is a Brazilian football coach and former player who played as a centre-back. He is the current head coach of Água Santa.

== Playing career ==
Born and raised in Santa Rosa, a neighborhood in Guarujá, São Paulo, Castilho began his career with local side EC Santa Rosa before moving to América Mineiro after a trial period. He later played for Villa Nova, AD Guarujá (two stints) and Real EC de Caeté before making his senior debut with VOCEM in 2001.

Castilho retired after playing for VOCEM, due to knee injuries.

== Coaching career ==
After retiring, Castilho worked as a vigilant while coaching in a football school in his hometown. In 2011, he became a youth coach at AD Guarujá, being also an interim during the club's last two matches of the Campeonato Paulista Segunda Divisão.

After leaving Guarujá, Castilho worked with the under-17 side of Portuguesa Santista and as an assistant of the under-20 team of São Vicente before returning to the club in 2014, now as head coach of the main squad. After the club was licensed, he worked as a youth coach in his hometown and also coached a team of the Order of Attorneys of Brazil in the city.

In 2020, Castilho moved to Maringá, initially as an assistant of Beto Portella. On 9 November of that year, he was named head coach of the squad, and led the club to a promotion from the Campeonato Paranaense Série Prata.

After starting the 2021 campaign again as an assistant, Castilho was again named head coach of Dogão on 6 April of that year, replacing sacked Marcos Soares. On 11 November, he renewed his contract for a further year, and led the club to the finals of the 2022 Campeonato Paranaense.

On 19 April 2022, Castilho took over Ipatinga for the year's Campeonato Mineiro Módulo II. He left in August, after also achieving promotion, and returned to Maringá for the upcoming season.

On 1 September 2023, Castilho further extended his link with Maringá until the end of 2024, and also led the side to another final in the 2024 Paranaense. He led the club to a promotion in the 2024 Série D, and also reached another final in the 2025 Campeonato Paranaense.

On 31 July 2025, Castilho was sacked from Dogão after an 11-match winless run. On 1 September, he agreed to become Uberlândia's head coach for the ensuing campaign, but only lasted three matches before being dismissed.

On 25 January 2026, Castillo replaced Marcelo Marelli at the helm of São José-SP. Knocked out in the second stage of the Campeonato Paulista Série A2, he renewed with the club for a further year on 18 April, but asked to leave on 10 June, after accepting an offer from Água Santa.

== Coaching statistics ==
As of 14 April 2026

Managerial record by team and tenure
| Team | Nat. | From | To | Record | | | | | | | | Ref |
| Team | Nat. | From | To | G | W | D | L | GF | GA | GD | Win % | Ref |
|---|---|---|---|---|---|---|---|---|---|---|---|---|
| Guarujá (interim) | (Brazil) | 21 August 2011 | 29 August 2011 | 2 | 1 | 0 | 1 | 4 | 8 | −4 | 50.00 | |
| Guarujá | (Brazil) | 1 March 2014 | 25 August 2014 | 16 | 4 | 3 | 9 | 21 | 32 | −11 | 25.00 | |
| Maringá | (Brazil) | 9 November 2020 | 31 December 2020 | 3 | 3 | 0 | 0 | 7 | 1 | +6 | 100.00 | |
| Maringá | (Brazil) | 6 April 2021 | 19 April 2022 | 26 | 11 | 8 | 7 | 41 | 26 | +15 | 42.31 | |
| Ipatinga | (Brazil) | 19 April 2022 | 2 August 2022 | 21 | 10 | 6 | 5 | 30 | 22 | +8 | 47.62 | |
| Maringá | (Brazil) | 27 November 2022 | 31 July 2025 | 108 | 50 | 33 | 25 | 158 | 111 | +47 | 46.30 | |
| Uberlândia | (Brazil) | 1 September 2025 | 18 January 2026 | 3 | 0 | 2 | 1 | 1 | 6 | −5 | 0.00 | |
| São José-SP | (Brazil) | 25 January 2026 | 10 June 2026 | 16 | 10 | 2 | 4 | 26 | 14 | +12 | 62.50 | |
| Água Santa | (Brazil) | 10 June 2026 | present | 0 | 0 | 0 | 0 | 0 | 0 | +0 | — | |
| Career total | | | | 195 | 89 | 54 | 52 | 288 | 220 | +68 | 45.64 | — |
