= Jonathan Costa =

Brazilian footballer

Personal information
- Full name: Jonathan Aparecido de Oliveira da Costa
- Date of birth: 19 April 1995 (age 31)
- Place of birth: Hortolândia, Brazil
- Height: 1.86 m (6 ft 1 in)
- Position: Centre-back

Team information
- Current team: Guarani

Senior career*
Years	Team	Apps	(Gls)
2013	SEV Hortolândia	13	(3)
2014	Penapolense	4	(0)
2015	Portimonense	4	(0)
2016–2017	Linense	1	(0)
2016	→ Bragantino (loan)	2	(0)
2017	Desportivo Brasil	0	(0)
2018–2019	Bragantino	16	(2)
2018	→ XV de Piracicaba (loan)	9	(0)
2019–2021	Grêmio Osasco	0	(0)
2020	→ Caldense (loan)	12	(0)
2020	→ Mirassol (loan)	4	(0)
2021–2022	Caldense	28	(2)
2021	→ Paraná (loan)	12	(1)
2022	Botafogo-PB	10	(0)
2023	Operário Ferroviário	19	(3)
2023–2025	Avaí	78	(4)
2026–	Guarani	5	(1)
- * Club domestic league appearances and goals as of 12:55, 29 January 2026 (UTC)

Jonathan Aparecido Oliveira da Costa (born 19 April 1995) is a Brazilian footballer who plays for Guarani. Mainly a centre-back, he can also play as a defensive midfielder.

== Career ==
Born in Hortolândia, São Paulo, Costa played for a social project before making his senior debut with hometown side SEV Hortolândia in 2013. On 13 January 2014, he signed for Penapolense, and was rarely used before moving abroad with Portuguese side Portimonense on 1 February 2015.

In December 2015, Costa returned to his home country and joined Linense. After just 16 minutes combined in two matches, he was loaned to Bragantino in May 2016, but mainly featured in the Copa Paulista.

After making no appearances for Linense in the 2017 season, Costa was announced at Desportivo Brasil on 26 May of that year. He agreed to a deal with XV de Piracicaba on 5 December, on loan from Bragantino, where he returned to play in the Série C on 11 April 2018.

Costa subsequently moved to Grêmio Osasco, and served loan stints at Caldense and Mirassol. On 29 January 2021, he returned to Caldense now in a permanent deal, before being loaned out to Paraná on 20 May; he returned to his parent club on 2 September, after rescinding his loan link.

On 8 April 2022, Costa signed for Botafogo-PB. He moved to Operário Ferroviário the following 20 January, but was transferred to Avaí on 26 July 2023.

On 25 November 2025, Guarani announced the signing of Costa for one year.

== Career statistics ==
As of 29 January 2026

Club	Season	League			State League		Cup		Continental		Other		Total	
Club	Season	Division	Apps	Goals	Apps	Goals	Apps	Goals	Apps	Goals	Apps	Goals	Apps	Goals
SEV Hortolândia	2013	Paulista 2ª Divisão	—		13	3	—		—		—		13	3
Penapolense	2014	Série D	3	0	1	0	—		—		—		4	0
Portimonense	2014–15	Segunda Liga	4	0	—		0	0	—		0	0	4	0
Portimonense	2015–16	Segunda Liga	0	0	—		1	0	—		0	0	1	0
Portimonense	Total		4	0	—		1	0	—		0	0	5	0
Linense	2016	Série D	—		1	0	1	0	—		—		2	0
Linense	2017	Paulista	—		0	0	—		—		—		0	0
Linense	Total		—		1	0	1	0	—		—		2	0
Bragantino (loan)	2016	Série B	2	0	—		—		—		12 (Note: Appearance(s) in Copa Paulista)	1	14	1
Desportivo Brasil	2017	Paulista A3	—		—		—		—		17	0	17	0
Bragantino	2018	Série C	12	1	—		—		—		6	0	18	1
Bragantino	2019	Série B	—		4	1	—		—		—		4	1
Bragantino	Total		12	1	4	1	—		—		6	0	22	2
XV de Piracicaba (loan)	2018	Paulista A2	—		9	0	—		—		—		9	0
Grêmio Osasco	2019	Paulista A3	—		—		—		—		4	0	4	0
Caldense (loan)	2020	Série D	—		12	0	—		—		—		12	0
Mirassol (loan)	2020	Série D	4	0	—		—		—		—		4	0
Caldense	2021	Série D	2	1	11	1	1	0	—		—		14	2
Caldense	2022	Série D	—		15	0	—		—		—		15	0
Caldense	Total		2	1	26	1	1	0	—		—		29	2
Paraná (loan)	2021	Série C	12	1	—		—		—		—		12	1
Botafogo-PB	2022	Série C	7	0	3	0	—		—		—		10	0
Operário Ferroviário	2023	Série C	9	1	10	2	—		—		—		19	3
Avaí	2023	Série B	11	0	—		—		—		2 (Note: Appearance(s) in Copa Santa Catarina)	1	13	1
Avaí	2024	Série B	13	1	11	1	—		—		—		24	2
Avaí	2025	Série B	30	1	13	1	—		—		—		43	2
Avaí	Total		54	2	24	2	—		—		2	1	80	5
Guarani	2026	Série C	0	0	5	1	0	0	—		—		5	1
Career total			109	6	108	10	3	0	0	0	41	2	261	18

== Honours ==
Mirassol

- Campeonato Brasileiro Série D: 2020

Avaí

- Campeonato Catarinense: 2025
