= Matheus Rocha =

Brazilian footballer

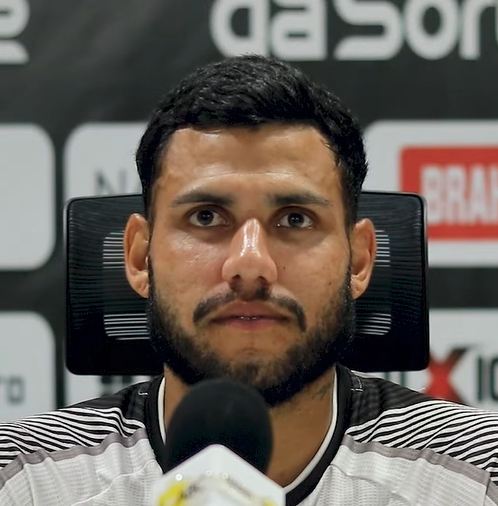
- Rocha in 2024

Personal information
- Full name: Matheus Victor de Araújo Rocha
- Date of birth: 27 December 1998 (age 27)
- Place of birth: Teresina, Brazil
- Height: 1.77 m (5 ft 10 in)
- Position: Right-back

Youth career
- Fluminense-PI
- 2014–2017: Sport Recife
- 2017–2018: Palmeiras

Senior career*
Years	Team	Apps	(Gls)
2019	Palmeiras	0	(0)
2019	→ Vitória (loan)	25	(1)
2020–2021	Mirassol	9	(1)
2020–2021	→ Oeste (loan)	28	(1)
2022	Maringá	6	(0)
2022	→ ABC (loan)	12	(0)
2023	Primavera	14	(0)
2023	Floresta	19	(0)
2024	Caxias	9	(0)
2024–2025	ABC	30	(2)
2026	São José-SP	21	(0)
- * Club domestic league appearances and goals as of 20:49, 29 April 2026 (UTC)

Matheus Victor de Araújo Rocha (born 27 December 1998), known as Matheus Rocha, is a Brazilian footballer who plays as a right-back.

== Career ==
Born in Teresina, Piauí, Rocha began his career with hometown side Fluminense-PI, and subsequently played for Sport Recife before joining Palmeiras in September 2017. After finishing his formation, he was loaned to Vitória on 29 January 2019.

Sparingly used, Rocha was presented at Mirassol on 20 December 2019. The following 7 August, after becoming a starter, he was loaned to Oeste until the end of the year, and remained at the club in the following year.

On 20 November 2021, Rocha was announced at Maringá for the upcoming season. On 14 April 2022, after finishing second in the 2022 Campeonato Paranaense, he was loaned to ABC, and despite helping the club in their promotion, his contract was not renewed and he left on 25 October.

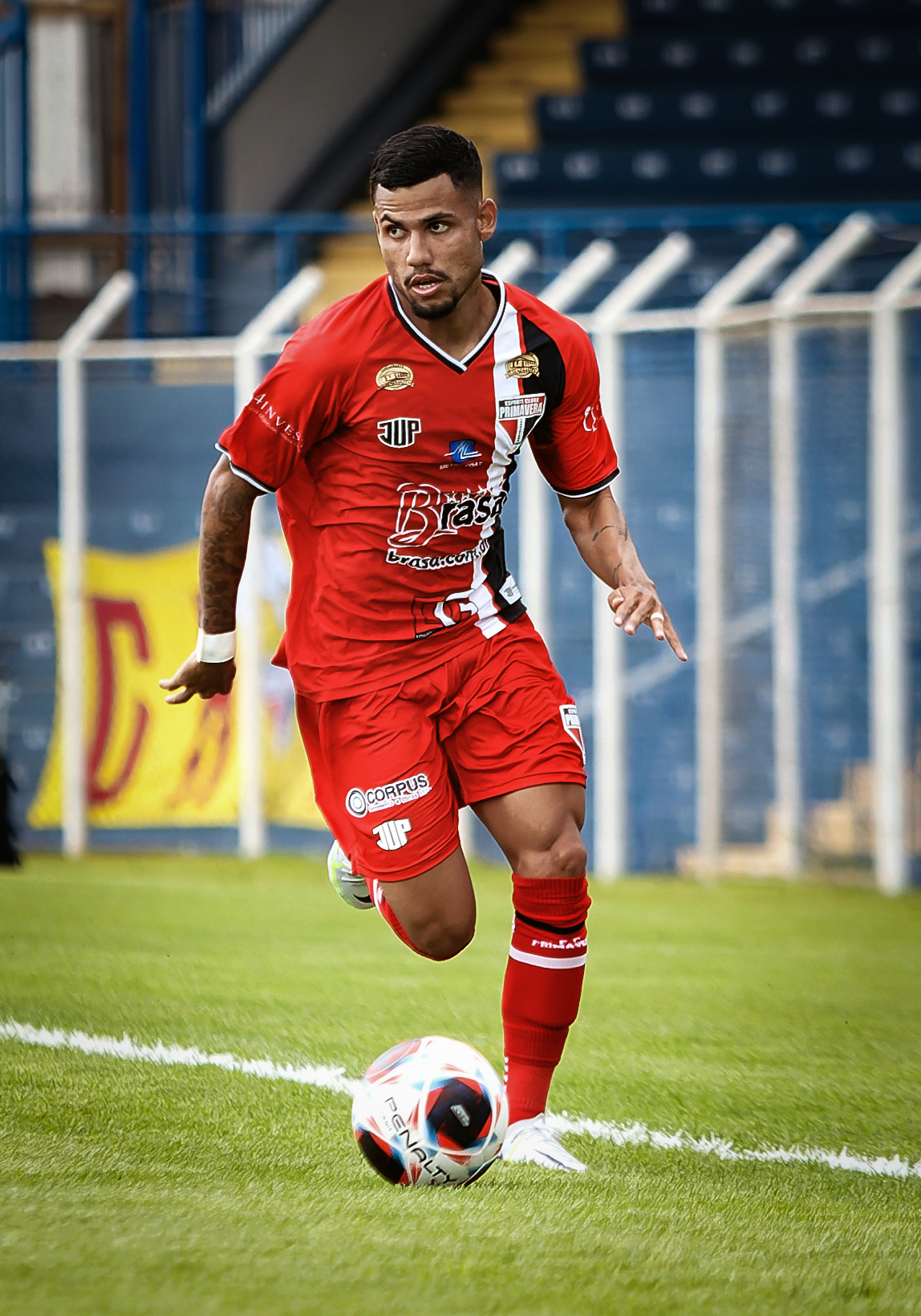
Rocha playing for Primavera in 2023

On 28 December 2022, Rocha was announced at Primavera. Regularly used, he ended the 2023 campaign at Floresta before signing for Caxias on 1 November of that year.

On 18 June 2024, Rocha returned to ABC, now in a permanent deal. On 18 November of the following year, he agreed to a deal with São José-SP.

== Career statistics ==
As of 29 April 2026.

Club	Season	League			State league (Note: Includes Campeonato Baiano, Campeonato Paulista, Campeonato Paulista Série A2, Campeonato Paranaense, Campeonato Gaúcho, Campeonato Potiguar)		Copa do Brasil		Continental		Other		Total	
Club	Season	Division	Apps	Goals	Apps	Goals	Apps	Goals	Apps	Goals	Apps	Goals	Apps	Goals
Vitória	2019	Série B	14	1	6	0	1	0	—		4 (Note: Appearances in the Copa do Nordeste)	1	25	2
Mirassol	2020	Série D	—		9	1	—		—		—		9	1
Oeste	2020	Série B	25	1	—		—		—		—		25	1
Oeste	2021	Série C	3	0	0	0	—		—		—		3	0
Oeste	Total		28	1	0	0	—		—		—		28	1
Maringá	2022	Paranaense	—		6	0	—		—		—		6	0
ABC (loan)	2022	Série C	12	0	—		—		—		—		12	0
Primavera	2023	Paulista A2	—		14	0	—		—		—		14	0
Floresta	2023	Série C	19	0	—		—		—		—		19	0
Caxias	2024	Série C	1	0	8	0	1	0	—		—		10	0
ABC	2024	Série C	9	1	—		—		—		—		9	1
ABC	2025	Série C	10	0	11	0	1	0	—		1	0	23	0
ABC	Total		19	1	11	0	1	0	—		1	0	32	1
São José-SP	2026	Paulista A2	—		21	0	—		—		—		21	0
Career total			93	3	75	1	3	0	0	0	5	1	176	5

== Honours ==
Palmeiras U20

- Campeonato Brasileiro Sub-20: 2018
- Campeonato Paulista Sub-20: 2018
