= Terra roxa =

Terra roxa (Portuguese pronunciation: [ˈtɛʁɐ ˈʁoʃɐ]) is a Portuguese phrase that may refer to:

- Terra roxa, a type of red soil common in southern and western Brazil
- Terra Roxa, Paraná
- Terra Roxa, São Paulo
