= Gustavo Santos =

Gustavo Santos may refer to:

- Gustavo dos Santos (born 1991), Brazilian sprinter
- Gustavo Santos (footballer, born 2002), Brazilian football forward
- Gustavo Santos (politician), Argentine politician
- Gustavo Almeida dos Santos (born 1996), Brazilian football forward
- Gustavo (footballer, born 1995) Brazilian football defender
- Gustavo Santos Costa (born 1996), Brazilian football forward
