= Marcos Vinícius (footballer, born 1997) =

Brazilian footballer

Personal information
- Full name: Marcos Vinícius da Silva Santos
- Date of birth: 26 March 1997 (age 29)
- Place of birth: Emilianópolis, Brazil
- Height: 1.76 m (5 ft 9 in)
- Position: Right back

Team information
- Current team: Goiás
- Number: 63

Youth career
- 2012–2014: São Paulo
- 2015: Grêmio
- 2016: Atlético Tubarão

Senior career*
Years	Team	Apps	(Gls)
2017–2018	Atlético Tubarão	25	(0)
2017	→ Brusque (loan)	6	(0)
2018–2020	Chapecoense	8	(0)
2019	→ Criciúma (loan)	11	(0)
2020–2021	Vilafranquense	23	(0)
2022–2024	Maringá	34	(0)
2022	→ ABC (loan)	22	(0)
2023	→ Coritiba (loan)	5	(0)
2024	→ Avaí (loan)	35	(1)
2025	Avaí	47	(2)
2026	Chapecoense	20	(0)
2026–	Goiás	7	(0)
- * Club domestic league appearances and goals as of 17 November 2026

Marcos Vinícius da Silva Santos (born 26 March 1997), known as Marcos Vinícius, is a Brazilian footballer who plays as a right back for Goiás.

== Club career ==
Marcos Vinícius was born in Emilianópolis, São Paulo, and represented São Paulo, Grêmio and Atlético Tubarão as a youth. He made his senior debut with the latter in the 2017 Campeonato Paranaense, being a regular starter during the competition.

In May 2017, Marcos Vinícius was included in Brusque's squad for the year's Série D, but returned to Tubarão for the 2018 season. On 16 May 2018, he was presented at Série A side Chapecoense.

Marcos Vinícius made his debut in the main category of Brazilian football on 14 October 2018, starting in a 1–0 home loss against Vitória. The following 15 April, after being rarely used, he moved to Criciúma on loan.

On 5 July 2020, after again being rarely used, Marcos Vinícius moved abroad for the first time in his career and signed for Liga Portugal 2 side Vilafranquense. He returned to Brazil in July 2021, and spent nearly six months unemployed before agreeing to a contract with Maringá on 9 December.

On 15 April 2022, Marcos Vinícius was loaned to ABC in the Série C, and helped the side to achieve promotion, as an undisputed starter. Back to Maringá for the 2023 season, he was again first-choice as the club reached the 2023 Campeonato Paranaense finals.

On 19 April 2023, Marcos Vinícius and teammates Matheus Bianqui and Vilar were loaned to top tier side Coritiba until the end of the year. The loan was terminated early on 7 July 2023.

== Career statistics ==
As of 17 November 2026.

Club	Season	League			State League		Cup		Continental		Other		Total	
Club	Season	Division	Apps	Goals	Apps	Goals	Apps	Goals	Apps	Goals	Apps	Goals	Apps	Goals
Atlético Tubarão	2017	Catarinense	—		12	0	—		—		—		12	0
Atlético Tubarão	2018	Série D	0	0	13	0	2	1	—		—		15	1
Atlético Tubarão	Total		0	0	25	0	2	1	—		—		27	1
Brusque (loan)	2017	Série D	6	0	—		—		—		3 (Note: Appearance(s) in Copa Santa Catarina)	0	9	0
Chapecoense	2018	Série A	1	0	—		—		—		—		1	0
Chapecoense	2019	Série A	0	0	5	0	0	0	1 (Note: Appearance(s) in Copa Sudamericana)	0	—		6	0
Chapecoense	2020	Série B	0	0	2	0	2	0	—		—		4	0
Chapecoense	Total		1	0	7	0	2	0	1	0	—		11	0
Criciúma (loan)	2019	Série B	11	0	—		—		—		—		11	0
Vilafranquense	2020–21	Liga Portugal 2	23	0	—		3	0	—		—		26	0
Maringá	2022	Paranaense	—		17	0	—		—		—		17	0
Maringá	2023	Série D	0	0	13	0	3	0	—		—		16	0
Maringá	2024	Paranaense	0	0	16	1	0	0	—		—		16	1
Maringá	Total		0	0	46	1	3	0	—		—		49	1
ABC (loan)	2022	Série C	22	0	—		—		—		—		22	0
Coritiba (loan)	2023	Série A	5	0	—		—		—		—		5	0
Avaí	2024	Série B	35	1	0	0	—		—		—		35	1
Avaí	2025	Série B	34	2	13	0	—		—		—		47	0
Avaí	Total		69	3	13	0	0	0	—		—		82	3
Chapecoense	2026	Série A	10	0	10	0	1	0	—		8 (Note: Appearances in Copa Sul-Sudeste)	0	29	0
Goiás	2026	Série B	7	0	0	0	—		—		—		7	0
Career total			154	3	101	1	11	1	1	0	11	0	278	5

== Honors ==
=== Clubs ===
Chapecoense

- Campeonato Catarinense: 2020

Avaí

- Campeonato Catarinense: 2025
