= Luciano Castán =

Brazilian footballer (born 1989)

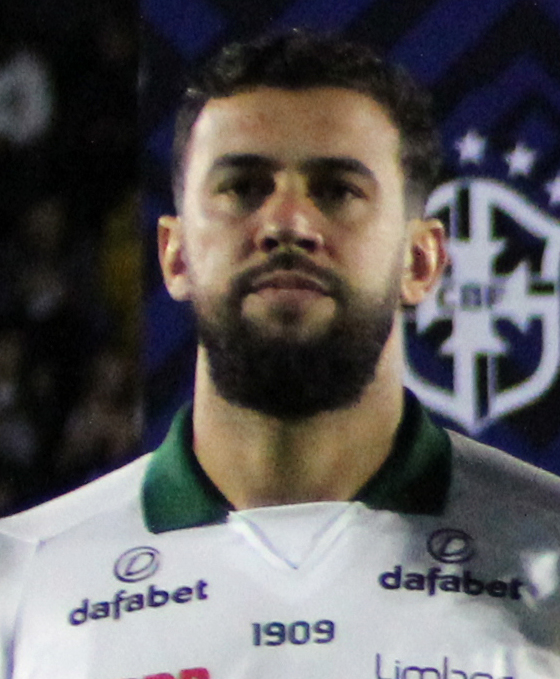

Personal information
- Full name: Luciano Castán da Silva
- Date of birth: 13 September 1989 (age 37)
- Place of birth: São Paulo, Brazil
- Height: 1.87 m (6 ft 1 1/2 in)
- Position: Centre back

Team information
- Current team: Criciúma
- Number: 4

Youth career
- União São João

Senior career*
Years	Team	Apps	(Gls)
2008–2011	União São João	26	(2)
2010	→ Santos (loan)	1	(0)
2011	→ Ponte Preta (loan)	2	(0)
2011	→ Paraná (loan)	28	(1)
2012	Bragantino	12	(0)
2013–2015	São Bernardo	54	(3)
2014	→ Portuguesa (loan)	23	(1)
2015	→ Paraná (loan)	28	(0)
2016–2017	Stade Brestois 29	32	(1)
2017–2018	Al-Khor	20	(0)
2019–2021	CSA	101	(3)
2021–2022	Coritiba	101	(11)
2023	Guarani	10	(0)
2023	Cruzeiro	36	(1)
2024	Sport	34	(1)
2025–	Criciúma	59	(0)
- * Club domestic league appearances and goals as of 15 April 2026

Luciano Castán da Silva (born September 13, 1989) is a Brazilian footballer who plays for Criciúma as a central defender.

== Club career ==
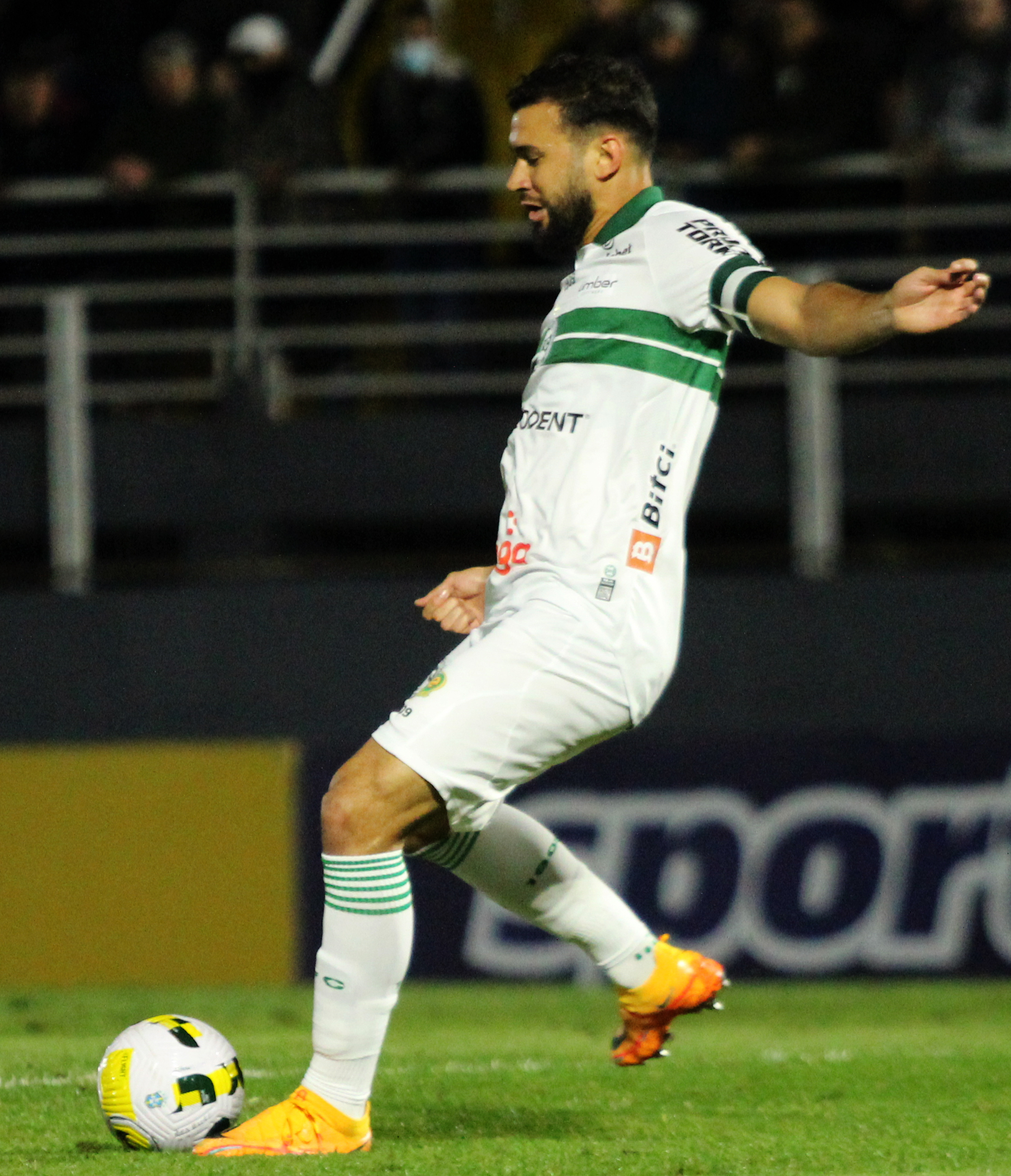
Castán with Coritiba in 2022

Castán started his professional career with União São João in 2007, before moving to Santos in January 2010. However, he appeared only once during his time in Peixe, starting and being sent off in a 4–2 home win against Sertãozinho, for the Paulista championship.

Castán moved to Ponte Preta on loan in December 2010. After again serving as a backup (only 180 minutes of action), he joined Paraná in February. On 27 January 2012 he moved to Bragantino, rescinding his link on 21 June.

On 19 November 2012 Castán moved to São Bernardo. After impressing during the club's 2013 Copa Paulista winning campaign and during 2014 Campeonato Paulista, he joined Portuguesa on 2 May 2014.

In July 2016, Castán signed with French side Stade Brestois 29. On 3 December 2018, he returned to Brazil and joined newly promoted club CSA.

== Personal life ==
His brother, Leandro, is a former football player who played at centre back.

== Honours ==
Coritiba

- Campeonato Paranaense: 2022

CSA

- Campeonato Alagoano: 2019

São Bernardo

- Copa Paulista: 2013

Santos

- Campeonato Paulista: 2010
