= Cascavel Esporte Clube =

Brazilian football club

Cascavel
- Full name: Cascavel Esporte Clube
- Nickname(s): Serpente; Cobra
- Founded: December 19, 1979
- Dissolved: December 17, 2001 merged with two other clubs to form Cascavel Clube Recreativo
- Ground: Estádio Olímpico Regional Arnaldo Busatto, Cascavel, Paraná state, Brazil
- Capacity: 45,000
- League: Campeonato Paranaense
- 2017: 7th
Home colors	Away colors

Cascavel Esporte Clube, commonly known as Cascavel, was a Brazilian football club based in Cascavel, Paraná state that competed in the Série B and in the Série C twice.

== History ==
The club was founded on December 19, 1979. Cascavel won the Campeonato Paranaense in 1980. The club competed in the Série B in 1981 and 1982 and was eliminated in the First Stage in both seasons. Cascavel competed in the Série C in 1995 and 1996 and was eliminated in the First Stage in both seasons. The club merged with SOREC and Cascavel S/A on December 17, 2001, to form Cascavel Clube Recreativo.

== Honours ==
- Campeonato Paranaense:
  - Winners (1): 1980
- Campeonato Paranaense Série Prata
  - Runners-up (1): 1979
- Campeonato Paranaense do Interior
  - Winners (3): 1980, 1987, 1988

== Stadium ==
Cascavel Esporte Clube played its home games at Estádio Olímpico Regional Arnaldo Busatto. The stadium has a maximum capacity of 45,000 people.
