= Dheimison =

Brazilian footballer (born 1989)

Personal information
- Full name: Dheimison Benavides Martins
- Date of birth: 1 August 1989 (age 37)
- Place of birth: São Paulo, Brazil
- Height: 1.84 m (6 ft 0 in)
- Position: Goalkeeper

Team information
- Current team: Floresta
- Number: 12

Youth career
- 2006–2010: Audax

Senior career*
Years	Team	Apps	(Gls)
2010–2013	Audax	1	(0)
2014–2016	Água Santa	11	(0)
2017	Maringá	2	(0)
2018–2020	Rio Claro	28	(0)
2019	→ Red Bull Brasil (loan)	0	(0)
2019	→ Red Bull Bragantino (loan)	0	(0)
2020–2021	Portuguesa	20	(0)
2022–2025	Maringá	96	(0)
2022	→ Oeste (loan)	10	(0)
2022	→ ABC (loan)	0	(0)
2025	→ Floresta (loan)	9	(0)
2025–2026	Primavera	0	(0)
2026–	Floresta	25	(0)
- * Club domestic league appearances and goals as of 9 November 2026

Dheimison Benavides Martins (born 1 August 1989), simply known as Dheimison, is a Brazilian professional footballer who plays as a goalkeeper for Floresta.

== Honours ==
Audax

- Campeonato Paulista Segunda Divisão: 2008

Maringá

- Campeonato Paranaense Série B: 2017

Red Bull Brasil

- Campeonato Paulista do Interior: 2019

Red Bull Bragantino

- Campeonato Brasileiro Série B: 2019

Portuguesa

- Copa Paulista: 2020
