= César (footballer, born 1995) =

Brazilian footballer (born 1995)

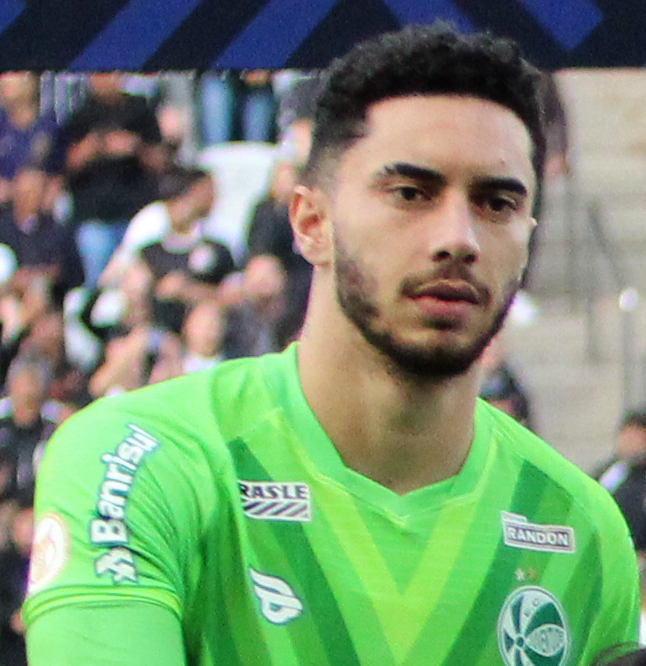

Personal information
- Full name: César Augusto Soares dos Reis Ribela
- Date of birth: 16 February 1995 (age 31)
- Place of birth: Uberaba, Brazil
- Height: 1.92 m (6 ft 4 in)
- Position: Goalkeeper

Team information
- Current team: Novorizontino
- Number: 31

Youth career
- Independente-MG
- Triângulo Mineiro
- 2012–2013: Londrina
- 2014–2015: Londrina

Senior career*
| Years | Team | Apps | (Gls) |
| 2015–2021 | Londrina | 100 | (0) |
| 2018–2019 | → Estoril (loan) | 3 | (0) |
| 2020 | → Coritiba (loan) | 0 | (0) |
| 2020–2021 | → Vitória (loan) | 10 | (0) |
| 2022 | Juventude | 33 | (0) |
| 2023–2024 | Mirassol | 7 | (0) |
| 2024–2025 | Avaí | 74 | (0) |
| 2026– | Novorizontino | 10 | (0) |
- * Club domestic league appearances and goals as of 17 November 2026

César Augusto Soares dos Reis Ribela (born 16 February 1995), simply known as César, is a Brazilian footballer who plays for Novorizontino as a goalkeeper.

== Club career ==
Born in Uberaba, Minas Gerais, César played for hometown sides Independente AC and Triângulo Mineiro FC before moving to the Paraná state in 2012, after agreeing to a contract with Junior Team. In 2014, he signed a professional deal with Londrina, being initially assigned to the youth setup.

Promoted to the first team in 2015, César made his senior debut on 26 March 2017, starting in a 0–0 Campeonato Paranaense away draw against J. Malucelli. He subsequently became a regular starter during the season, appearing in 36 Série B matches and winning the 2017 Primeira Liga.

On 12 June 2018, César moved abroad and joined Portuguese LigaPro side Estoril, on a one-year loan deal. He returned to his parent club in June 2019, after featuring rarely, and was again a regular starter.

On 10 January 2020, César joined Coritiba on loan until December. After being a third-choice behind Wilson and Alex Muralha, he left the club and moved to Vitória on 12 March, also in a temporary deal.

Back to Londrina for the 2021 campaign, César played his 100th match for the club on 5 November of that year, in a 0–1 home loss against Cruzeiro. He left the club in December, after narrowly avoiding relegation.

On 17 December 2021, César agreed to a two-year deal with Série A side Juventude.

== Career statistics ==
As of 16 January 2022

| Club | Season | League | | | State League | | Cup | | Continental | | Other | | Total | |
| Club | Season | Division | Apps | Goals | Apps | Goals | Apps | Goals | Apps | Goals | Apps | Goals | Apps | Goals |
|---|---|---|---|---|---|---|---|---|---|---|---|---|---|---|
| Londrina | 2015 | Série C | 0 | 0 | 0 | 0 | 0 | 0 | — | | — | | 0 | 0 |
| Londrina | 2016 | Série B | 0 | 0 | 0 | 0 | — | | — | | — | | 0 | 0 |
| Londrina | 2017 | Série B | 36 | 0 | 7 | 0 | 0 | 0 | — | | 3 (Note: Appearance(s) in Primeira Liga) | 0 | 46 | 0 |
| Londrina | 2018 | Série B | 0 | 0 | 8 | 0 | 2 | 0 | — | | — | | 10 | 0 |
| Londrina | 2019 | Série B | 17 | 0 | — | | — | | — | | — | | 17 | 0 |
| Londrina | 2021 | Série B | 29 | 0 | 3 | 0 | — | | — | | — | | 32 | 0 |
| Londrina | Total | | 82 | 0 | 18 | 0 | 2 | 0 | — | | — | | 102 | 0 |
| Estoril (loan) | 2018–19 | LigaPro | 3 | 0 | — | | 0 | 0 | — | | 0 | 0 | 3 | 0 |
| Coritiba (loan) | 2020 | Série A | 0 | 0 | 0 | 0 | 0 | 0 | — | | — | | 0 | 0 |
| Vitória (loan) | 2020 | Série B | 8 | 0 | 2 | 0 | 0 | 0 | — | | 0 | 0 | 10 | 0 |
| Juventude | 2022 | Série A | 0 | 0 | 0 | 0 | 0 | 0 | — | | — | | 0 | 0 |
| Career total | | | 93 | 0 | 20 | 0 | 2 | 0 | 0 | 0 | 3 | 0 | 118 | 0 |

== Honours ==
Londrina

- Primeira Liga: 2017
- Campeonato Paranaense: 2021

Avaí

- Campeonato Catarinense: 2025

Novorizontino

- Campeonato Brasileiro Série B: 2026
