= Marcos Soares (footballer) =

Brazilian football manager (born 1975)

Personal information
- Full name: Marcos Alexandre Souza Soares
- Date of birth: 30 July 1975 (age 51)
- Place of birth: Rio de Janeiro, Brazil
- Height: 1.84 m (6 ft 0 in)
- Position: Centre back

Team information
- Current team: Saudi Arabia U20 (manager)

Senior career*
| Years | Team | Apps | (Gls) |
| 1996 | America-RJ | | |
| 1997–1998 | Mesquita | | |
| 1999 | Serrano-RJ | | |
| 2000–2001 | Atlético Alagoinhas | | |
| 2001–2003 | Oliveirense | 32 | (4) |
| 2003–2004 | Espinho | 8 | (0) |
| 2004 | Oliveira do Bairro | 17 | (1) |
| 2005–2006 | Terengganu | | |
| 2006 | Guangzhou | | |
| 2006 | Brazlândia | ? | (1) |
| 2007 | Dom Pedro II | | |

Managerial career
- 2008–2009: Brasiliense (assistant)
- 2009–2010: Brasiliense U20
- 2010: Brasiliense (interim)
- 2010–2011: Santa Maria U20
- 2011: Atlético Ceilandense (interim)
- 2011: Brasiliense
- 2012: Sobradinho
- 2013–2014: Brasília
- 2014: Brasiliense
- 2015: Anápolis
- 2015–2017: Santos U20
- 2017–2018: Corinthians U17
- 2019–2020: Botafogo U20
- 2021: Maringá
- 2021–2022: Al-Hilal U17
- 2022–: Saudi Arabia U-20
- * Club domestic league appearances and goals

Marcos Alexandre Souza Soares (born 30 July 1975) is a Brazilian football manager and former player who played as a central defender. He is the current manager of the Saudi Arabia national U-20.

== Playing career ==
Known as Ditão during his playing days, Rio de Janeiro-born Soares began his senior career with hometown side America-RJ. After playing for Mesquita and Serrano in his native state, he moved to Atlético Alagoinhas in 2000.

In July 2001, Soares moved abroad and joined Segunda Liga side U.D. Oliveirense, but could not prevent the club's relegation in the campaign. After another campaign in the club, he subsequently represented S.C. Espinho and Oliveira do Bairro S.C. before switching to Thailand's Terengganu FC in 2005.

In 2006, after a short stint at Guangzhou FC, Soares returned to his home country after signing for Brazlândia. He agreed to a deal with Dom Pedro II for the 2007 season, and subsequently retired with the club due to injuries.

== Managerial career ==
Shortly after retiring, Soares became an assistant manager at Brasiliense. In 2009, he started to manage the club's under-20 squad, being also an interim in the 2010 campaign.

After being in charge of Santa Maria's under-20s in 2010, Soares left the club in February 2011 to become the interim manager of Atlético Ceilandense. In March, he returned to Brasiliense as a replacement to sacked Reinaldo Gueldini, and won the year's Campeonato Brasiliense. Confirmed as manager for the 2011 Série C, he was sacked in September and replaced by Argel Fucks.

Soares was named manager of Sobradinho on 13 January 2012. After leaving the club, he toured through some European clubs before returning to Brazil. In July 2013, he took over Brasília.

On 9 February 2014, despite being unbeaten in the season, Soares was sacked by Brasília. He subsequently returned to Brasiliense for a third spell, but was also dismissed on 23 October.

On 17 December 2014, Soares agreed to become Anápolis manager for the upcoming season. After leading the club in their promotion to the first division of Campeonato Goiano, he was named manager of Santos' under-20 squad.

Soares was relieved of his duties from Peixe in February 2017, and became Dyego Coelho's assistant at Corinthians' under-20 side the following month. On 14 December 2018, he was appointed manager of the under-20 team of Botafogo.

Soares was sacked by Bota on 10 October 2020, and took over Maringá the following 4 January.

== Honours ==
=== Manager ===
Brasiliense

- Campeonato Brasiliense Sub-20: 2010
- Campeonato Brasiliense: 2011

Saudi Arabia

- Arab Games
  - (gold) Gold medal (1): 2023
