= Guilherme Pira =

Brazilian footballer

Personal information
- Full name: Guilherme Henrique Silva Gonçalves
- Date of birth: 7 July 2000 (age 26)
- Place of birth: Piracicaba, Brazil
- Height: 1.77 m (5 ft 9 1/2 in)
- Position: Winger

Team information
- Current team: Maringá
- Number: 10

Youth career
- São Caetano

Senior career*
Years	Team	Apps	(Gls)
2020	São Caetano	11	(0)
2020-2022	Inter Limeira	22	(2)
2021	→ Manaus (loan)	9	(2)
2022	→ Manaus (loan)	10	(3)
2022–2023	Ponte Preta	6	(0)
2023	Operário Ferroviário	15	(1)
2023–2024	C.D. Nacional	7	(1)
2024	Operário Ferroviário	21	(0)
2024	Chadormalu	8	(1)
2025	Brusque	33	(9)
2026–	Maringá	28	(3)
- * Club domestic league appearances and goals as of 24 October 2026

Guilherme Henrique Silva Gonçalves (born 7 July 2000), commonly known as Guilherme Pira, is a Brazilian footballer who plays as a winger for Maringá.

== Honours ==
Ponte Preta

- Campeonato Paulista Série A2: 2023

Maringá

- Campeonato Brasileiro Série C: 2026
