= João Pedro (footballer, born 1997) =

Brazilian footballer

Personal information
- Full name: João Pedro Heinen Silva
- Date of birth: 20 January 1997 (age 29)
- Place of birth: Terra Roxa, Brazil
- Height: 1.70 m (5 ft 7 in)
- Position: Midfielder

Team information
- Current team: Ypiranga de Erechim

Senior career*
Years	Team	Apps	(Gls)
2015–2021	Athletico Paranaense	49	(6)
2015	→ Guaratinguetá (loan)	8	(3)
2017	→ Paraná (loan)	22	(4)
2018	→ Botafogo (loan)	8	(0)
2019	→ Paraná (loan)	29	(4)
2020	→ Atlético Goianiense (loan)	2	(0)
2021	→ FC Cascavel (loan)	25	(2)
2022	Ponte Preta	4	(0)
2022–	Ypiranga de Erechim	37	(5)
- * Club domestic league appearances and goals as of 14 August 2023

João Pedro Heinen Silva (born 20 January 1997), known as João Pedro, is a Brazilian ex-footballer who played as a midfielder.

== Career statistics ==
As of 10 March 2020

Club	Season	League			State League		Cup		Continental		Other		Total	
Club	Season	Division	Apps	Goals	Apps	Goals	Apps	Goals	Apps	Goals	Apps	Goals	Apps	Goals
Athletico Paranaense	2015	Série A	0	0	1	0	0	0	—		—		1	0
Athletico Paranaense	2016	Série A	9	0	—		3	0	—		—		12	0
Athletico Paranaense	2017	Série A	1	0	13	2	1	0	3 (Note: Appearance(s) in Copa Libertadores)	0	—		18	2
Athletico Paranaense	2018	Série A	0	0	16	4	0	0	—		—		16	4
Athletico Paranaense	2019	Série A	0	0	9	0	0	0	—		—		9	0
Athletico Paranaense	Subtotal		10	0	39	6	4	0	3	0	—		56	6
Guaratinguetá (loan)	2016	Série C	8	3	—		—		—		—		8	3
Paraná (loan)	2017	Série B	22	4	—		—		—		1 (Note: Appearance(s) in Primeira Liga)	0	23	4
Botafogo (loan)	2018	Série A	8	0	—		—		—		—		8	0
Paraná (loan)	2019	Série B	29	4	—		—		—		—		29	4
Atlético Goianiense (loan)	2020	Série A	0	0	2	0	0	0	—		—		2	0
Career total			77	11	41	6	4	0	3	0	0	0	126	17
