= Mirandinha (footballer, born 1999) =

Brazilian footballer

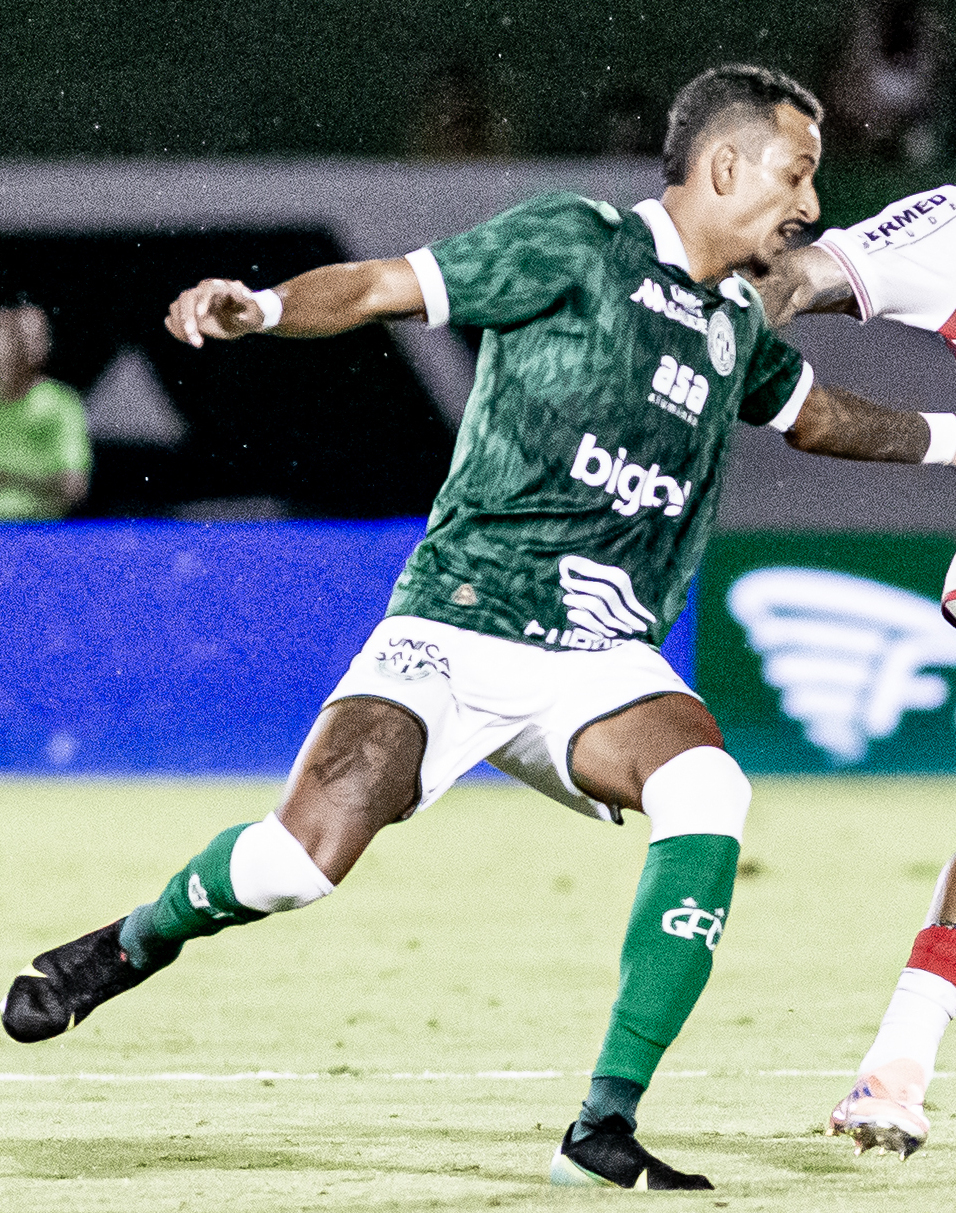
- Mirandinha with Guarani in 2026

Personal information
- Full name: Luiz Carlos Paulino de Carvalho
- Date of birth: 19 December 1999 (age 26)
- Place of birth: São João do Ivaí, Brazil
- Height: 1.79 m (5 ft 10 in)
- Position: Forward

Team information
- Current team: Jeonnam Dragons (on loan from Guarani)
- Number: 79

Youth career
- Rio Claro
- 2018–2019: Oeste

Senior career*
Years	Team	Apps	(Gls)
2019	Rolândia	13	(5)
2019–2020	Apucarana Sports	0	(0)
2020–2025	Maringá	70	(9)
2021	→ Figueirense (loan)	8	(1)
2022	→ Londrina (loan)	20	(1)
2023	→ Gyeongnam (loan)	10	(0)
2023	→ Paysandu (loan)	2	(0)
2024	→ Ypiranga-RS (loan)	20	(0)
2025	→ Volta Redonda (loan)	18	(2)
2025–	Guarani	31	(2)
2026–	→ Jeonnam Dragons (loan)	2	(0)
- * Club domestic league appearances and goals as of 8 August 2026

Luiz Carlos Paulino de Carvalho (born 19 December 1999), commonly known as Mirandinha, is a Brazilian footballer who plays as a forward for South Korean club Jeonnam Dragons, on loan from Guarani.

== Career ==
Born in São João do Ivaí, Paraná, Mirandinha played for Rio Claro and Oeste as a youth before making his senior debut with Rolândia in 2019. On 21 August 2020, after a period at Apucarana Sports, he was announced at Maringá.

On 9 June 2021, after impressing in the Campeonato Paranaense, Mirandinha was loaned to Série C side Figueirense until the end of the year. Back to his parent club ahead of the 2022 season, he was announced at Londrina also in a temporary deal on 12 April of that year.

Back to Maringá after his loan ended, Mirandinha again moved out on loan on 21 March 2023, now to K League 2 side Gyeongnam FC. He returned in July, and played a few matches for Dogão before being loaned out to Paysandu on 24 August.

In April 2024, after another short period back at Maringá, Mirandinha left for Ypiranga-RS, also on loan. On 8 January 2025, still owned by Maringá, he was announced at Volta Redonda.

On 10 June 2025, Mirandinha moved to Guarani on a permanent contract.

== Personal life ==
Mirandinha's father also nicknamed Mirandinha, was also a footballer and a forward.

== Career statistics ==
As of 21 January 2026

Club	Season	League			State League		Cup		Continental		Other		Total	
Club	Season	Division	Apps	Goals	Apps	Goals	Apps	Goals	Apps	Goals	Apps	Goals	Apps	Goals
Rolândia	2019	Paranaense Série Prata	—		13	5	—		—		—		13	5
Apucarana Sports	2019	Paranaense Série Prata	—		—		—		—		6 (Note: Appearance(s) in Taça FPF)	2	6	2
Maringá	2020	Paranaense Série Prata	—		12	1	—		—		—		12	1
Maringá	2021	Paranaense	—		12	1	—		—		—		12	1
Maringá	2022	Paranaense	—		17	3	—		—		—		17	3
Maringá	2023	Série D	5	1	8	1	2	0	—		—		15	2
Maringá	2024	Série D	—		16	2	2	1	—		—		18	3
Maringá	Total		5	1	65	8	4	1	—		—		74	10
Figueirense (loan)	2021	Série C	8	1	—		—		—		8 (Note: Appearance(s) in Copa Santa Catarina)	0	16	0
Londrina (loan)	2022	Série B	20	1	—		—		—		—		20	1
Gyeongnam (loan)	2023	K League 2	10	0	—		2	0	—		—		12	0
Paysandu (loan)	2023	Série C	2	0	—		—		—		—		2	0
Ypiranga-RS (loan)	2024	Série C	20	0	—		—		—		4 (Note: Appearance(s) in Copa FGF)	1	24	1
Volta Redonda (loan)	2025	Série B	8	0	10	2	—		—		—		18	2
Guarani	2025	Série C	15	2	—		—		—		—		15	2
Guarani	2026	Série C	0	0	3	0	0	0	—		—		3	0
Guarani	Total		15	2	3	0	0	0	—		—		18	2
Career total			88	5	91	15	6	1	0	0	18	3	203	24

== Honours ==
Figueirense

- Copa Santa Catarina: 2021
