= Felipe Saraiva =

Brazilian footballer (born 1998)

Personal information
- Full name: Felipe Saraiva de Souza Silva
- Date of birth: 9 March 1998 (age 28)
- Place of birth: Santa Isabel, Brazil
- Height: 1.72 m (5 ft 7 1/2 in)
- Position: Forward

Team information
- Current team: Inter de Limeira
- Number: 98

Youth career
- 2009: Portuguesa
- 2014–2016: Ponte Preta
- 2016: → São Paulo (loan)

Senior career*
Years	Team	Apps	(Gls)
2016–2020	Ponte Preta	55	(3)
2016	→ São Paulo (loan)	0	(0)
2019	→ Botafogo-SP (loan)	29	(0)
2020–2023	Maringá	22	(4)
2021	→ Inter de Limeira (loan)	13	(0)
2021	→ Avaí (loan)	1	(0)
2022	→ Operário Ferroviário (loan)	24	(1)
2023	→ Ituano (loan)	38	(3)
2024	Al-Muharraq		
2024	Gyeongnam FC	11	(2)
2025–2026	Ansan Greeners	31	(1)
2026	→ Náutico (loan)	16	(2)
2026–	Inter de Limeira	4	(0)
- * Club domestic league appearances and goals as of 9 November 2026

Felipe Saraiva de Souza Silva (born 9 March 1998), known as Felipe Saraiva, is a Brazilian footballer who plays for Inter de Limeira. Mainly a forward, he can also play as an attacking midfielder.

== Club career ==
=== Ponte Preta ===
Saraiva was born in Santa Isabel, São Paulo, and joined Ponte Preta's youth setup in 2014. On 12 February 2016, after impressing with their under-17 side, he was loaned to São Paulo for the season. Initially assigned to their under-20 squad, he also featured in the year's Copa Paulista.

Upon returning to Ponte in January 2017, Saraiva was assigned to the main squad and made his first team – and Série A – debut on 25 June 2017, coming on as a second-half substitute for Elton in a 1–2 home loss against Palmeiras. He scored his first senior goal on 13 September, netting his team's only in a 1–3 away loss against Sport Recife, for the year's Copa Sudamericana.

Saraiva lost his starting spot after being regularly used in the 2017 Série A (where his club suffered relegation) and in the 2018 Campeonato Paulista. On 29 January 2019, he was loaned to Botafogo-SP for the 2019 campaign.

Back at Ponte for the 2020 season, Saraiva featured sparingly before leaving the club in June 2020, after failing to agree to new terms.

=== Maringá ===
On 26 September 2020, free agent Saraiva was announced at Maringá for the second division of the Campeonato Paranaense. He helped the side in their promotion to the top tier of the state league after scoring twice in six matches.

On 23 January 2021, Saraiva was presented at Inter de Limeira, after joining the club on loan for the 2021 Campeonato Paulista.

== Career statistics ==
As of 17 March 2023

Club	Season	League			State League		Cup		Continental		Other		Total	
Club	Season	Division	Apps	Goals	Apps	Goals	Apps	Goals	Apps	Goals	Apps	Goals	Apps	Goals
Ponte Preta	2016	Série A	0	0	0	0	0	0	—		—		0	0
Ponte Preta	2017	Série A	21	0	0	0	0	0	2 (Note: Appearance(s) in Copa Sudamericana)	1	—		23	1
Ponte Preta	2018	Série B	13	1	14	2	8	1	—		—		35	4
Ponte Preta	2020	Série B	0	0	7	0	2	0	—		—		9	0
Ponte Preta	Total		34	1	21	2	10	1	2	1	—		67	5
São Paulo (loan)	2016	Série A	0	0	0	0	0	0	0	0	4 (Note: Appearance(s) in Copa Paulista)	0	4	0
Botafogo-SP (loan)	2019	Série B	21	0	8	0	—		—		—		29	0
Maringá	2020	Paranaense Série Prata	—		6	2	—		—		—		6	2
Maringá	2022	Paranaense	—		16	2	—		—		—		16	2
Maringá	Total		—		22	4	—		—		—		22	4
Inter de Limeira (loan)	2021	Série D	0	0	13	0	—		—		—		13	0
Avaí (loan)	2021	Série B	1	0	—		—		—		—		13	0
Operário Ferroviário (loan)	2022	Série B	24	1	—		—		—		—		24	1
Ituano (loan)	2023	Série B	0	0	9	1	0	0	—		—		9	1
Career total			80	2	73	7	10	1	2	1	4	0	169	11
