= Rafael William =

Brazilian footballer

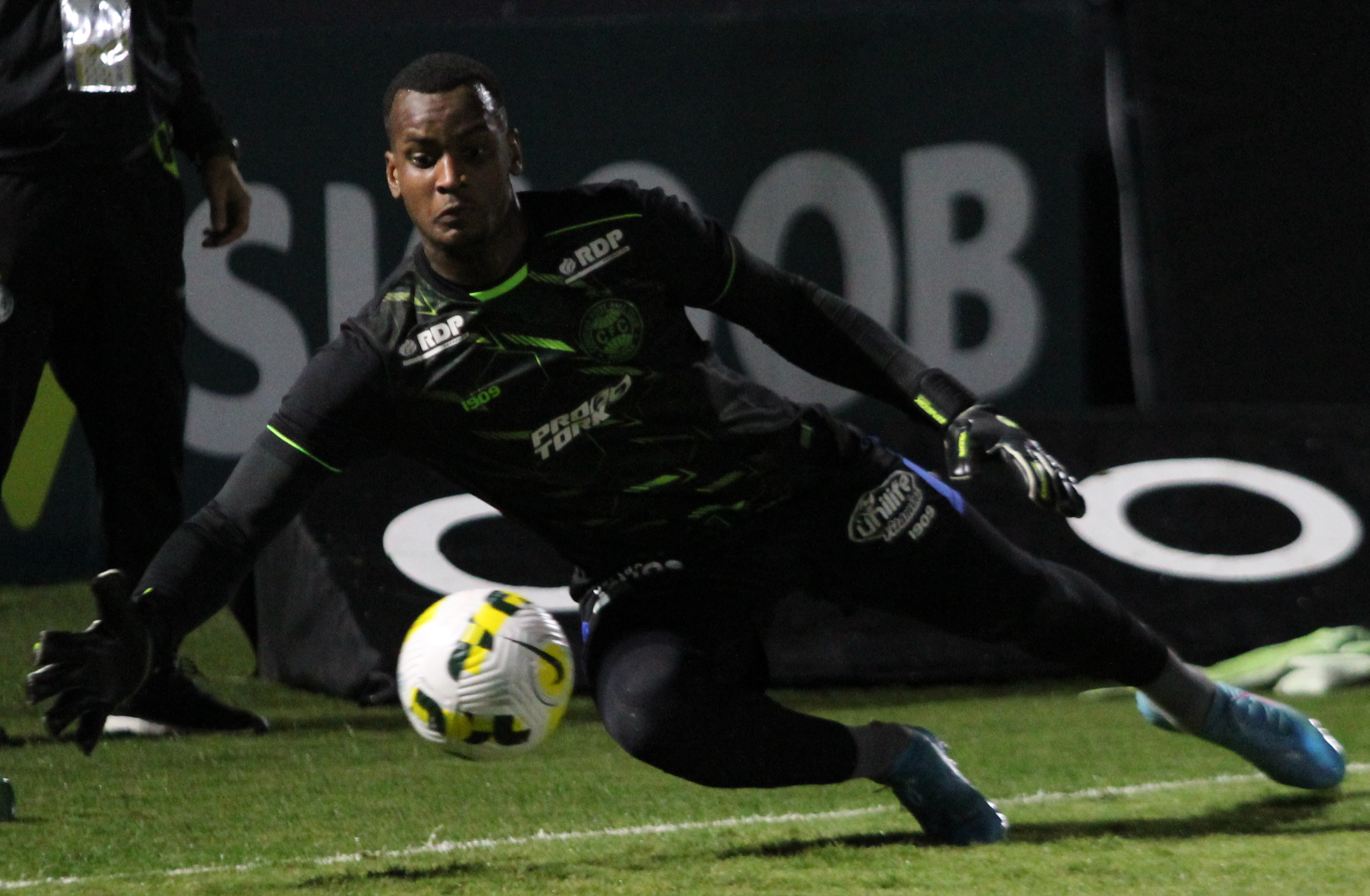

Personal information
- Full name: Rafael William Dias Pinheiro
- Date of birth: 30 September 2001 (age 25)
- Place of birth: Salto, Brazil
- Height: 1.98 m (6 ft 6 in)
- Position: Goalkeeper

Team information
- Current team: Maringá (on loan from Coritiba)

Youth career
- 2015–2016: Cruzeiro
- 2017–2021: Coritiba

Senior career*
Years	Team	Apps	(Gls)
2022–	Coritiba	8	(0)
2023	→ Sampaio Corrêa (loan)	0	(0)
2023–	→ Maringá (loan)	0	(0)
- * Club domestic league appearances and goals as of 6 August 2023

Rafael William Dias Pinheiro (born 30 September 2001), known as Rafael William, is a Brazilian footballer who plays as a goalkeeper for Maringá, on loan from Coritiba.

== Club career ==
Born in Salto, São Paulo, Rafael William joined Cruzeiro's youth setup at the age of 13. Released by the club in the end of 2016, he subsequently moved to Coritiba.

Promoted to the first team for the 2022 season, Rafael William made his debut with the main squad on 2 February of that year, starting in a 2–0 Campeonato Paranaense home win over Rio Branco-PR. A backup to Alex Muralha, he made his Série A debut on 12 June, starting in a 2–0 home loss to Palmeiras as Muralha was injured.

== Career statistics ==
As of 12 June 2022

Club	Season	League			State League		Cup		Continental		Other		Total	
Club	Season	Division	Apps	Goals	Apps	Goals	Apps	Goals	Apps	Goals	Apps	Goals	Apps	Goals
Coritiba	2022	Série A	1	0	2	0	0	0	—		—		3	0
Career total			1	0	2	0	0	0	0	0	0	0	3	0

== Honours ==
Coritiba

- Campeonato Paranaense: 2022
