= Matheus Bianqui =

Brazilian footballer

Personal information
- Full name: Matheus Henrique Bianqui
- Date of birth: 31 January 1998 (age 28)
- Place of birth: Ribeirão Claro, Brazil
- Height: 1.87 m (6 ft 2 in)
- Position: Midfielder

Team information
- Current team: Novorizontino (on loan from Coritiba)
- Number: 17

Youth career
- 2015–2017: Grêmio Ourinhos
- 2017–2018: Londrina

Senior career*
Years	Team	Apps	(Gls)
2019–2021	Londrina	85	(10)
2022–2023	Maringá	33	(3)
2022	→ Chapecoense (loan)	31	(4)
2023	→ Coritiba (loan)	27	(2)
2024–	Coritiba	38	(3)
2025	→ Mirassol (loan)	13	(0)
2026–	→ Novorizontino (loan)	40	(8)
- * Club domestic league appearances and goals as of 17 November 2026

Matheus Henrique Bianqui (born 31 January 1998) is a Brazilian footballer who plays as a midfielder for Novorizontino, on loan from Coritiba.

== Club career ==
Born in Ribeirão Claro, Paraná, Bianqui joined Londrina's youth setup in March 2017, from Grêmio Ourinhos, and signed a professional contract with the club in October of that year. He made his first team debut on 20 January 2019, coming on as a second-half substitute for Marcinho in a 0–0 Campeonato Paranaense away draw against Cianorte.

Bianqui scored his first senior goal on 24 January 2019, netting his team's third in a 3–0 away win over Cascavel CR. He became a regular starter during the 2020 season, as the club achieved promotion from the Série C.

On 17 December 2021, Bianqui signed a contract with Maringá until the end of 2025, after the club bought 50% of his economic rights. The following 8 April, he was announced at Chapecoense on loan for the remainder of the year.

Back to Maringá for the 2023 season, Bianqui was a regular starter as the club reached the 2023 Campeonato Paranaense finals. On 19 April, he and teammates Marcos Vinícius and Vilar were loaned to Série A side Coritiba until the end of the year.

At the end of 2023, Coritiba bought Matheus Bianqui, signing a 3-year contract. His first year of contract was below expectations, going 11 months without scoring goals, and he was a reserve for much of the season.

== Career statistics ==
As of 31 May 2023.

Club	Season	League			State League		Cup		Continental		Other		Total	
Club	Season	Division	Apps	Goals	Apps	Goals	Apps	Goals	Apps	Goals	Apps	Goals	Apps	Goals
Londrina	2019	Série B	10	1	8	2	1	0	—		—		19	3
Londrina	2020	Série C	18	2	8	2	1	0	—		—		27	4
Londrina	2021	Série B	30	2	17	3	—		—		—		47	5
Londrina	Total		58	5	33	7	2	0	—		—		93	12
Maringá	2022	Paranaense	—		16	1	—		—		—		16	1
Maringá	2023	Série D	0	0	14	2	3	0	—		—		17	2
Maringá	Total		0	0	30	3	3	0	—		—		33	3
Chapecoense (loan)	2022	Série B	31	4	—		—		—		—		31	4
Coritiba (loan)	2023	Série A	4	0	—		—		—		—		4	0
Career total			93	9	63	10	5	0	0	0	0	0	161	19
