= São João do Ivaí =

Coordinates: 23.98°S 51.8178°W

- Municipality
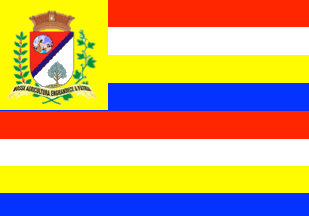
- Flag
- Interactive map of São João do Ivaí
- Country: Brazil
- Region: Southern
- State: Paraná
- Mesoregion: Norte Central Paranaense

Population (2020)
  - Total: 10,056
- Time zone: UTC−3 (BRT)

São João do Ivaí is a municipality in the state of Paraná in the Southern Region of Brazil.

== See also ==
- List of municipalities in Paraná
