= Igor Bohn =

Brazilian footballer

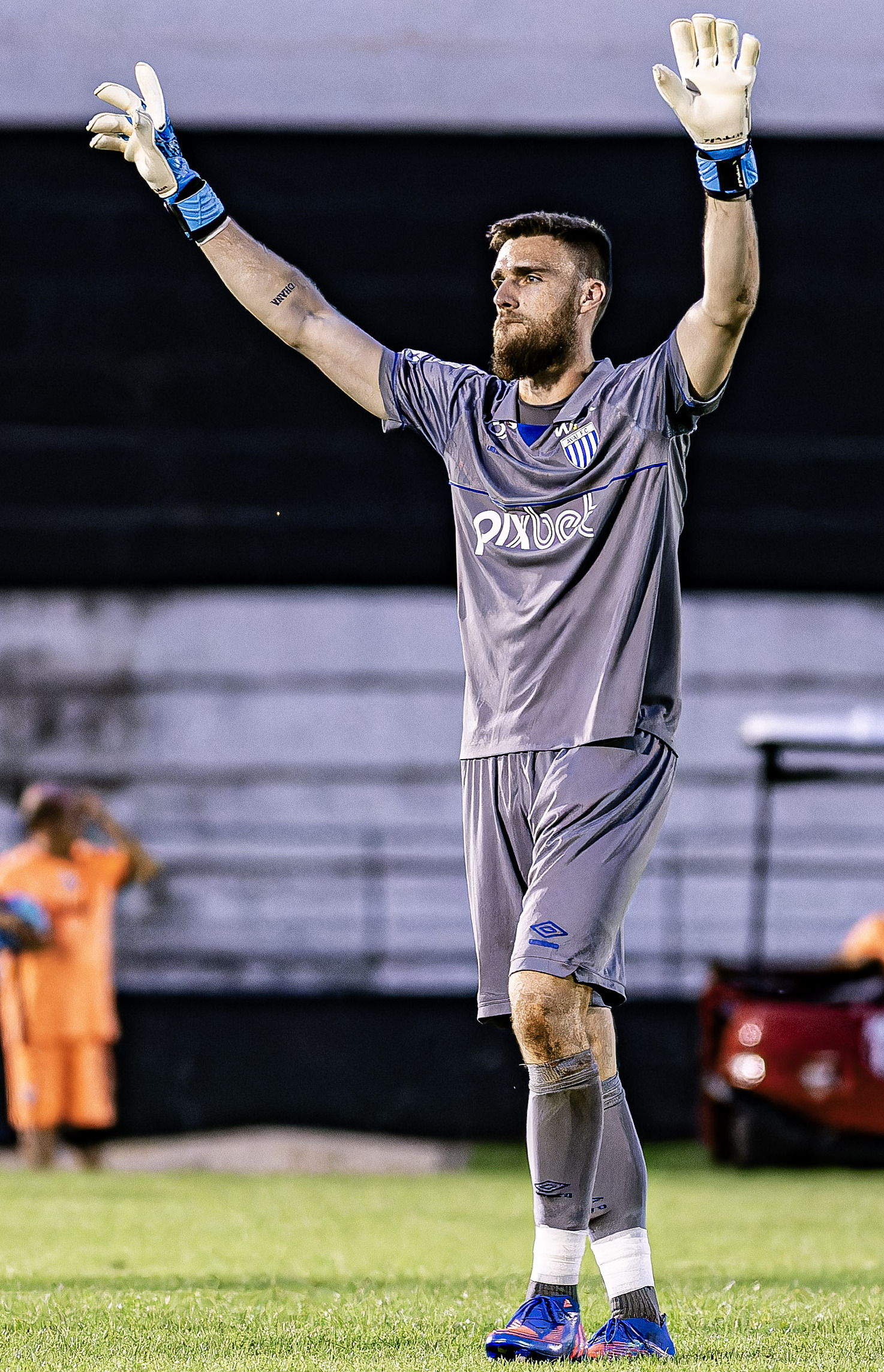
- Bohn playing for Avaí in 2023

Personal information
- Full name: Igor José Bohn
- Date of birth: 2 May 1996 (age 30)
- Place of birth: Panambi, Brazil
- Height: 1.93 m (6 ft 4 in)
- Position: Goalkeeper

Team information
- Current team: Avaí
- Number: 1

Youth career
- Internacional

Senior career*
Years	Team	Apps	(Gls)
2017–2019	Internacional	0	(0)
2018	→ ABC (loan)	3	(0)
2019	→ São José-RS (loan)	0	(0)
2020–2021	Botafogo-SP	37	(0)
2022	Chapecoense	3	(0)
2022–	Avaí	71	(0)
- * Club domestic league appearances and goals as of 18 November 2026

Igor José Bohn (born 2 May 1996) is a Brazilian footballer who plays as a goalkeeper for Avaí.

== Career ==
Born in Panambi, Rio Grande do Sul, Bohn was an Internacional youth graduate. On 9 April 20218, after winning the 2017 Campeonato Brasileiro de Aspirantes and playing in the Copa FGF, both with the under-23 team, he was loaned to Série C side ABC.

On 22 January 2019, Bohn joined fellow third division side São José-RS also in a temporary deal, but only featured in the Copa FGF. On 8 January 2020, he was presented at Botafogo-SP.

After spending the first year as a backup to Darley, Bohn became a starter during the 2021 season. On 2 January 2022, he agreed to a one-year deal with Chapecoense.

Despite being a second-choice to João Paulo during the entire 2022 Campeonato Catarinense, Bohn signed a contract until December 2023 with Série A side Avaí on 28 July 2022. On 11 August of the following year, he renewed his link until 2025.

== Career statistics ==
As of 29 February 2024

Club	Season	League			State League		Cup		Continental		Other		Total	
Club	Season	Division	Apps	Goals	Apps	Goals	Apps	Goals	Apps	Goals	Apps	Goals	Apps	Goals
Internacional	2017	Série B	0	0	—		0	0	—		5 (Note: Appearance(s) in Copa FGF)	0	5	0
Internacional	2018	Série A	—		—		—		—		3	0	3	0
Internacional	Total		0	0	—		0	0	—		8	0	8	0
ABC (loan)	2018	Série C	3	0	—		—		—		—		3	0
São José-RS (loan)	2019	Série C	0	0	0	0	0	0	—		5	0	5	0
Botafogo-SP	2020	Série B	8	0	0	0	—		—		2 (Note: Appearance(s) in Copa Paulista)	0	10	0
Botafogo-SP	2021	Série C	17	0	12	0	—		—		12	0	41	0
Botafogo-SP	Total		25	0	12	0	—		—		14	0	51	0
Chapecoense	2022	Série B	0	0	3	0	0	0	—		—		3	0
Avaí	2022	Série A	0	0	—		—		—		—		0	0
Avaí	2023	Série B	22	0	6	0	0	0	—		—		28	0
Avaí	2024	Série B	0	0	10	0	—		—		—		10	0
Avaí	Total		22	0	16	0	0	0	—		—		38	0
Career total			50	0	31	0	0	0	0	0	27	0	107	0

== Honours ==
Internacional

- Campeonato Brasileiro de Aspirantes: 2017

Avaí

- Campeonato Catarinense: 2025
