= Vinícius Guarapuava =

Brazilian footballer

Personal information
- Full name: Vinícius Szeuczuk Ribeiro
- Date of birth: 5 August 1997 (age 29)
- Place of birth: Guarapuava, Brazil
- Height: 1.91 m (6 ft 3 in)
- Position: Centre-back

Team information
- Current team: Aparecidense

Youth career
- Chapecoense

Senior career*
Years	Team	Apps	(Gls)
2017–2020	Chapecoense	1	(0)
2018	→Guarani Aires (loan)	10	(1)
2019	→São Gabriel (loan)	12	(0)
2019	→Concórdia (loan)	7	(0)
2020	Glória	3	(0)
2020–2021	Inter-SM	6	(0)
2021	Azuriz	13	(0)
2021–2022	Paraná	11	(2)
2022–	Azuriz	16	(1)
2022–2023	→Portimonense (loan)	0	(0)
2023–	→Aparecidense (loan)	0	(0)
- * Club domestic league appearances and goals as of 20:04, 20 February 2022 (UTC)

Vinícius Szeuczuk Ribeiro (born 5 August 1997), known as Vinícius Guarapuava, is a Brazilian professional footballer who plays as a centre-back for Aparecidense.

== Professional career ==
Vinícius Guarapuava is a youth product of Chapecoense, and began his senior career with them in 2017. He had loans with the sides Guarani Aires, São Gabriel, and Concórdia from 2018 to 2019. He moved to Glória on 11 January 2020. After a short stint with Inter-SM in 2020, he moved to Azuriz in 2021, and that same year moved to Paraná. He returned to Azuriz once more on 25 January 2021. On 12 June 2022, he signed a three-year contract with Primeira Liga side Portimonense.
