= Gustavo Vilar =

Brazilian footballer (born 2000)

Personal information
- Full name: Gustavo Vilar do Santos
- Date of birth: 18 April 2000 (age 26)
- Place of birth: Guarujá, Brazil
- Height: 1.89 m (6 ft 2 in)
- Position: Centre back

Team information
- Current team: Botafogo SP

Youth career
- 2019–2020: Santos

Senior career*
Years	Team	Apps	(Gls)
2020–2022	Maringá	35	(4)
2021	→ São Bernardo (loan)	0	(0)
2022	→ Londrina (loan)	15	(0)
2022	Londrina	17	(1)
2023–2025	Maringá	43	(3)
2023	→ Coritiba (loan)	1	(0)
2024	→ Avaí (loan)	27	(0)
2025–	Botafogo SP	55	(4)
- * Club domestic league appearances and goals as of 18 November 2026

Gustavo Vilar dos Santos (born 18 April 2000), known as Gustavo Vilar or just Vilar, is a Brazilian footballer who plays as a central defender for Botafogo SP.

== Club career ==
Born in Guarujá, São Paulo, Vilar played amateur tournaments in his hometown before joining Santos in September 2019, after a trial period. He signed a three-month contract with the club in December, being initially assigned to the under-20 team.

On 22 March 2020, Vilar left Peixe as his contract expired, and signed for Maringá on 8 September. He helped the club to achieve promotion from the Campeonato Paranaense Série Prata in that year, and became a regular starter afterwards.

On 27 August 2021, Vilar moved on loan to São Bernardo for the Copa Paulista, but did not play. He returned to his parent club on 6 December, and was again a starter as they reached the 2022 Campeonato Paranaense finals.

On 12 April 2022, Vilar was loaned to Série B side Londrina, with a buyout clause. On 2 August, after already establishing himself as a first-choice, he signed a permanent deal until 2025, after the club bought 50% of his economic rights.

On 13 January 2023, Vilar returned to Maringá on a four-year contract. On 19 April, he and teammates Marcos Vinícius and Matheus Bianqui were loaned to Série A side Coritiba until the end of the year.

== Career statistics ==
As of 4 May 2023.

Club	Season	League			State League		Cup		Continental		Other		Total	
Club	Season	Division	Apps	Goals	Apps	Goals	Apps	Goals	Apps	Goals	Apps	Goals	Apps	Goals
Maringá	2020	Paranaense Série Prata	—		8	1	—		—		—		8	1
Maringá	2021	Paranaense	—		11	1	—		—		—		11	1
Maringá	2022	Paranaense	—		16	2	—		—		—		16	2
Maringá	Total		—		35	4	—		—		—		35	4
Londrina	2022	Série B	32	1	—		—		—		—		32	1
Maringá	2023	Série D	0	0	13	0	3	1	—		—		16	1
Coritiba (loan)	2023	Série A	1	0	—		—		—		—		1	0
Career total			33	1	48	4	3	1	0	0	0	0	84	6
