= Bernardo Lemes =

Brazilian footballer (born 2002)

Bernardo
Personal information
- Full name: Bernardo Marcos Lemes
- Date of birth: 8 January 2002 (age 24)
- Place of birth: Curitiba, Brazil
- Height: 1.86 m (6 ft 1 in)
- Position: Defensive midfielder

Team information
- Current team: Brusque
- Number: 5

Youth career
- Coritiba

Senior career*
Years	Team	Apps	(Gls)
2021–2025	Coritiba	41	(0)
2023–2024	→ Guarani (loan)	12	(0)
2025	→ Inter de Limeira (loan)	7	(0)
2025	→ Brusque (loan)	10	(1)
2026–	Brusque	34	(1)
- * Club domestic league appearances and goals as of 9 November 2026

Bernardo Lemes (born 8 January 2002) is a Brazilian professional footballer who plays as a defensive midfielder for Brusque.
