= Felipe Macedo =

Brazilian footballer (born 1994)

Personal information
- Full name: Felipe Francisco Macedo
- Date of birth: 27 March 1994 (age 32)
- Place of birth: São Miguel do Araguaia, Brazil
- Height: 1.87 m (6 ft 2 in)
- Position: Centre back

Youth career
- Goiás

Senior career*
Years	Team	Apps	(Gls)
2012–2017	Goiás	76	(0)
2012	→ Aparecidense (loan)	5	(0)
2017–2021	Portimonense	19	(1)
2019–2020	→ Penafiel (loan)	22	(2)
2020–2021	→ Covilhã (loan)	6	(1)
2021–2022	PAEEK	1	(0)
- * Club domestic league appearances and goals as of 17 September 2021

Felipe Francisco Macedo (born 27 March 1994) is a Brazilian footballer who plays as a centre-back. He is a free agent.

== Club career ==
Born in São Miguel do Araguaia, Goiás, Felipe Macedo graduated with Goiás' youth setup and made his senior debuts while on loan at Aparecidense. On 3 October 2013, he made his first team – and Série A – debut for the latter, coming on as a first-half substitute in a 1–2 away loss against Vitória.

In 2014, Felipe Macedo was made a starter by manager Ricardo Drubscky. On 26 February 2015, he renewed his link with the club, signing until 2019.
