= Márcio Silva (footballer) =

Brazilian footballer (born 2001)

Personal information
- Full name: Márcio Gleyson Leite da Silva
- Date of birth: 7 July 2001 (age 25)
- Place of birth: Juru, Brazil
- Height: 1.92 m (6 ft 4 in)
- Position: Centre back

Team information
- Current team: Botafogo-SP

Youth career
- Audax
- 2018: Palmeiras
- 2019–2021: Coritiba

Senior career*
Years	Team	Apps	(Gls)
2021–	Coritiba	14	(0)
2023–	→ Botafogo-SP (loan)	31	(0)
- * Club domestic league appearances and goals as of 11 November 2023

Márcio Gleyson Leite da Silva (born 7 February 2001), known as Márcio Silva, is a Brazilian professional footballer who plays as a central defender for Botafogo-SP on loan from Coritiba.

== Honours ==
Coritiba

- Campeonato Paranaense: 2022
