= Marmeleiro =

Coordinates: 26°08′56″S 53°01′33″W

- Municipality
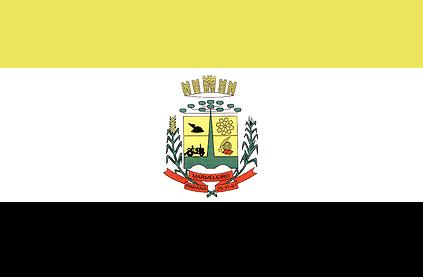
- Flag Coat of arms
- Interactive map of Marmeleiro
- Country: Brazil
- Region: Southern
- State: Paraná
- Mesoregion: Sudoeste Paranaense

Population (2020)
  - Total: 14,387
- Time zone: UTC−3 (BRT)

Marmeleiro is a municipality in the state of Paraná in the Southern Region of Brazil.

== See also ==
- List of municipalities in Paraná
