= Gustavo Santos (footballer, born 2002) =

Brazilian footballer (born 2002)

Gustavo
Personal information
- Full name: Gustavo Santos Simões da Silva
- Date of birth: 23 April 2002 (age 24)
- Place of birth: Praia Grande, Brazil
- Height: 1.83 m (6 ft 0 in)
- Position: Forward

Team information
- Current team: FC Osaka (on loan from Avaí)
- Number: 42

Youth career
- Matonense
- 2019: Vasco da Gama
- 2020–2022: Avaí

Senior career*
Years	Team	Apps	(Gls)
2021–	Avaí	13	(2)
2023–	→ FC Osaka (loan)	0	(0)
- * Club domestic league appearances and goals as of 18:45, 7 February 2023 (UTC)

Gustavo Santos Simões da Silva (born 23 April 2002), known as Gustavo Santos or just Gustavo, is a Brazilian footballer who plays as a forward for FC Osaka, on loan from Avaí.

== Club career ==
Born in Praia Grande, São Paulo, Gustavo represented Matonense and Vasco da Gama before joining Avaí's youth setup in 2020. He made his first team debut with the latter on 7 April 2021, coming on as a second-half substitute and scoring the winner in a 1–0 Campeonato Catarinense home success over Joinville.

After another two first team appearances, Gustavo subsequently returned to the under-20s, and was promoted back to the first team after the 2022 Copa São Paulo de Futebol Júnior. On 21 March 2022, he renewed his contract with the club until 2025.

Gustavo made his Série A debut on 3 July 2022, replacing Eduardo in a 2–1 home loss against Cuiabá.

== Career statistics ==
As of 7 February 2023

Club	Season	League			State League		Cup		Continental		Other		Total	
Club	Season	Division	Apps	Goals	Apps	Goals	Apps	Goals	Apps	Goals	Apps	Goals	Apps	Goals
Avaí	2021	Série B	0	0	3	1	0	0	—		—		3	1
Avaí	2022	Série A	1	0	6	0	1	0	—		—		8	0
Avaí	2023	Série B	0	0	3	1	0	0	—		—		3	1
Career total			1	0	12	2	1	0	0	0	0	0	14	2

== Honours ==
Avaí

- Campeonato Catarinense: 2021
