= Estádio Olímpico Regional Jacy Miguel Scanagatta =

Multi-use stadium in Cascavel, Brazil

Coordinates: 24.975015°S 53.502538°W

Olímpico Regional Jacy Miguel Scanagatta
- Olímpico Regional
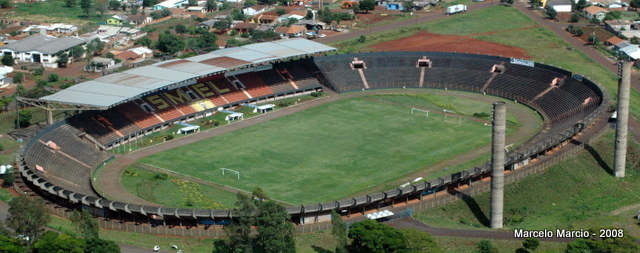
- Sisbrace
- Interactive map of Olímpico Regional Jacy Miguel Scanagatta
- Full name: Estádio Olímpico Regional Jacy Miguel Scanagatta
- Former names: Estádio Olímpico Regional Arnaldo Busatto
- Location: Cascavel, Paraná, Brazil
- Owner: Cascavel City Hall
- Capacity: 28,125
- Surface: Grass

Construction
- Opened: November 10, 1982

Tenants
- Cascavel Esporte Clube (1982-2001); Cascavel Clube Recreativo; Futebol Clube Cascavel

Estádio Olímpico Regional Jacy Miguel Scanagatta, sometimes nicknamed Olímpico is a multi-use stadium in Cascavel, Brazil. It is currently used mostly for football matches and hosts the home games of Cascavel Clube Recreativo and Futebol Clube Cascavel, and hosted the home games of Cascavel Esporte Clube. The stadium is able to hold 28,125 people, and was built in 1982.

The stadium is owned by the Cascavel City Hall. The stadium is named after Arnaldo Busatto, who was an alderman (vereador, in Portuguese language), state deputy and federal deputy. But in 2023, the official name was changed to Jacy Miguel Scanagatta, the mayor who built it.

== History ==
In 1982, the works on the stadium were completed. The inaugural match was played on November 10 of that year, when São Paulo beat Cascavel 1-0. The first goal of the stadium was scored by São Paulo's Paulo César. The stadium's attendance record currently stands at 35,000, set in the inaugural match.
