= Terra Roxa, Paraná =

Coordinates: 24°09′25″S 54°05′49″W

- Municipality
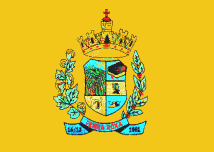
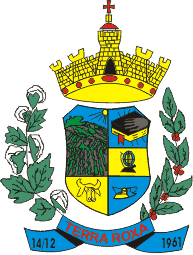
- Flag Coat of arms
- Interactive map of Terra Roxa, Paraná
- Country: Brazil
- Region: Southern
- State: Paraná
- Mesoregion: Oeste Paranaense

Population (2020)
  - Total: 17,522
- Time zone: UTC−3 (BRT)

Terra Roxa, Paraná is a municipality in the state of Paraná in the Southern Region of Brazil.

== See also ==
- List of municipalities in Paraná
