= Maringá Futebol Clube =

Brazilian football club

Maringá
- Full name: Maringá Futebol Clube
- Nicknames: Dogão (Big dog); Tricolor
- Founded: 7 July 2010; 16 years ago
- Ground: Estádio Willie Davids
- Capacity: 16,226
- President: João Victor Mazzer
- Head coach: Rodrigo Chipp
- League: Campeonato Brasileiro Série C Campeonato Paranaense
- 2025 2025: Série C, 11th of 20; Paranaense, 2nd of 12
Home colours	Away colours	Third colours

Maringá Futebol Clube, usually shortened to Maringá, is a Brazilian football team from Maringá in the southern state of Paraná. The club was founded on 7 July 2010 as Grêmio Metropolitano Maringá. Their stadium, the Estádio Willie Davids was built in 1957.

== History ==
Note: The name Maringá Futebol Clube was used previously by an unrelated club founded in 1995 that after winning the title of the Second Division in its first participation, participated in the Campeonato Paranaense from 1996 to 1998 and also participated in the Campeonato Brasileiro Série C in 1997.

In the same years of its foundation already won the 3rd Division State Championship and got promoted to 2nd Division, where the club played 3 consecutive seasons (2011 to 2013). When, finally, they won the championship and got promoted to 1st Division of the State.

In their 1st participation in 2014, the club reached the finals, eventually losing to Londrina. In 2015 they won Copa Paraná, a second level tournament, the state cup.

In 2016 they got relegated to Campeonato Paranaense Série Prata and won it in 2017. They also won Copa Paraná again that year.

After that, played 2 more years in State's 1st Division (2018 and 2019), then got relegated again to 2nd Division in 2019.

In 2020 Maringá FC won the Campeonato Paranaense 2nd tier again and got promoted to the 1st Division, where the club still since 2021.

In 2023, Maringá FC Participated in the Copa do Brasil Reaching the third phase of the championship, in the third round they faced a great team, Flamengo, and in the first leg at home they ended up winning 2-0, a great result for the club.

In 2024, Maringá FC has gained promotion to the Série C for getting to the Semi-Finals of the Campeonato Brasileiro Série D. In 2026 they were Série C champions, marking their first national title, and also got granted an spot in the Campeonato Brasileiro Série B for 2027.

== Rivalries ==
=== Derby Maringaense (Maringaense Derby) ===
The "Derby Maringaense" is far from the value and importance of the Coffee Derby, its played between Grêmio Maringá and Maringá FC, began to be disputed in 2010 and the record is as follows:

- Matches: 6
- Grêmio Maringá Wins: 2
- Draws: 1
- Maringá FC Wins: 3
- Grêmio Maringá Goals: 7
- Maringá FC Goals: 14

== Players ==
=== First team squad ===
As of 20 August 2026

Note: Flags indicate national team as defined under FIFA eligibility rules; some limited exceptions apply. Players may hold more than one non-FIFA nationality.

No.	Pos.	Nation	Player
1	GK	BRA	Gabriel Affonso (on loan from São José EC)
2	DF	BRA	Gabriel Souza (on loan from Cianorte)
3	DF	BRA	Gabriel Santos
4	DF	BRA	Wendel Lomar (on loan from Capivariano)
5	MF	BRA	Kelvi Gomes
6	DF	BRA	Thiago Rosa
7	FW	BRA	Edison Negueba
8	MF	BRA	Adeílson Maranhão
9	FW	BRA	Giovane Gomes
10	FW	BRA	Guilherme Pira
11	MF	BRA	Danielzinho
12	GK	BRA	Romário
13	DF	BRA	Keven
14	DF	BRA	Felipe
16	FW	BRA	Rian Patric

No.	Pos.	Nation	Player
17	FW	BRA	Iago Santana
18	DF	BRA	Jonathan
19	FW	BRA	Julio Rodrigues
20	MF	BRA	Bruno Cheron
21	FW	BRA	Ronald Camarão
23	MF	BRA	Paulinho
25	GK	BRA	Neto
28	MF	BRA	Lucas Bonifácio
29	FW	BRA	Raí Natalino
30	DF	BRA	Ronald Carvalho
35	FW	BRA	Pedrinho
37	MF	BRA	Serginho (on loan from Brasiliense)
44	DF	BRA	Jesiel
77	FW	BRA	Rafinha (on loan from Tombense)
99	FW	BRA	Caíque (on loan from Tombense)

== Honours ==
=== Official tournaments ===
National
Competitions	Titles	Seasons
Campeonato Brasileiro Série C	1	2026
State
Competitions	Titles	Seasons
Copa Paraná	2	2015, 2017
Campeonato Paranaense Série Prata	2	2013, 2017
Campeonato Paranaense Série Bronze	1	2010

=== Runners-up ===
- Campeonato Paranaense (4): 2014, 2022, 2024, 2025
- Campeonato Paranaense Série Prata (1): 2020
