= Nidal Asmar =

Lebanese-born Australian sport shooter

Personal information
- Full name: Nidal Asmar
- Nationality: Lebanese
- Born: 26 July 1969 (age 56) Beirut, Lebanon
- Height: 1.83 m (6 ft 0 in)
- Weight: 80 kg (176 lb)

Sport
- Sport: Shooting
- Event: Trap (TR125)
Medal record
Men's shooting
Representing Lebanon
Asian Championships
Bronze medal – third place	2012 Doha	Trap team

Nidal Asmar (Arabic: نضال الاسمر; born 26 July 1969 in Beirut) is a Lebanese-born Australian sport shooter. Holding his dual citizenship to compete internationally for his native homeland, Asmar placed fourteenth in trap shooting at the 2004 Summer Olympics, and eventually shot a perfect 125 to break his own world record at the 2007 Australian Cup in his current residence Melbourne, Australia.

Asmar qualified as a lone shooter for the Lebanese squad in the men's trap at the 2004 Summer Olympics in Athens, after having accepted a wild card invitation from the International Shooting Sport Federation. He fired 117 out of 125 targets to openly force a five-way tie with Brazil's Rodrigo Bastos, Germany's Karsten Bindrich, Kuwait's Naser Meqlad, and Finland's Petri Nummela for fourteenth place in the qualifying round, the highest ever rank for an athlete representing Lebanon.
