= Guarapuava =

- Municipality
- Municipality of Guarapuava
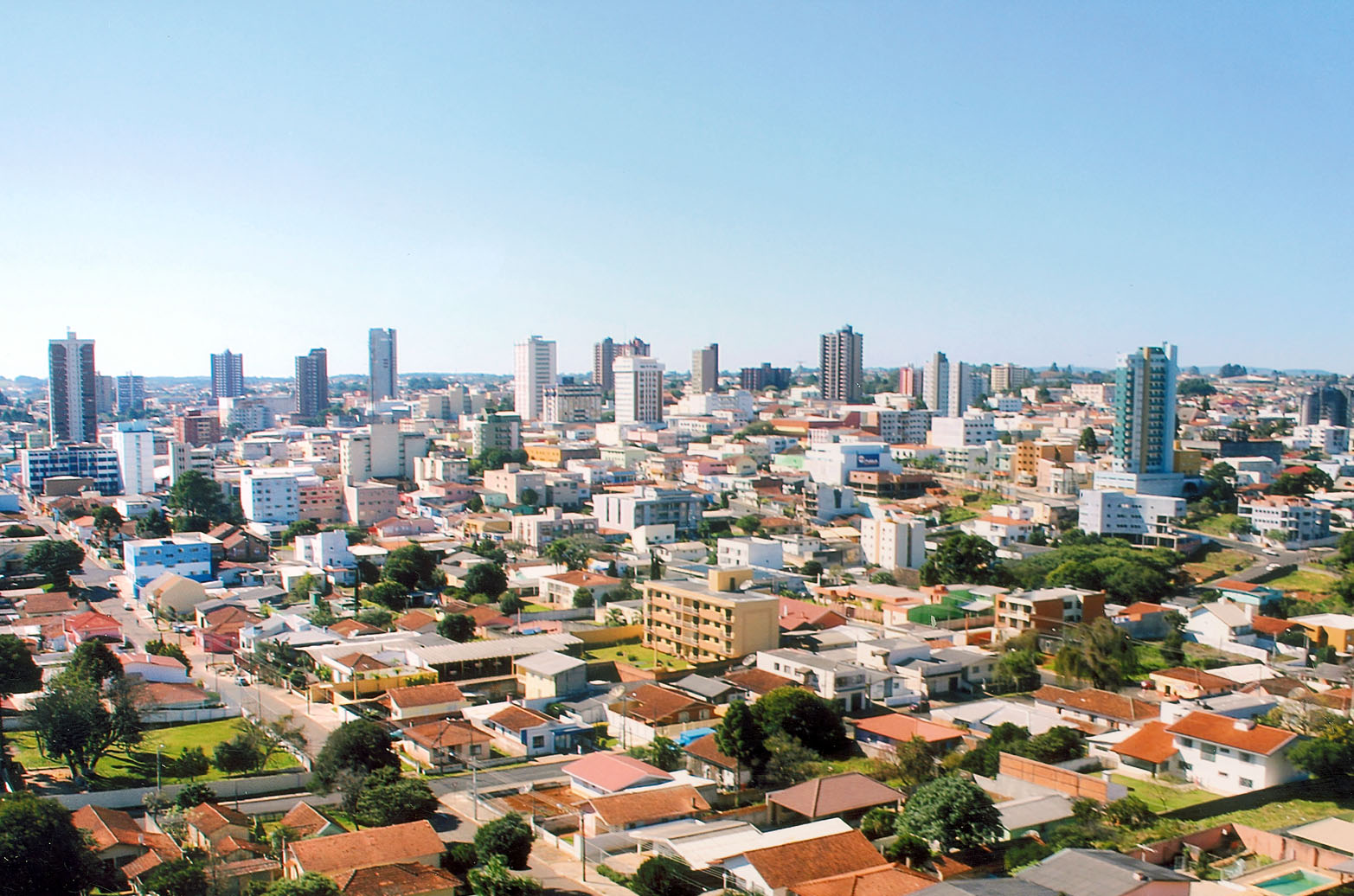
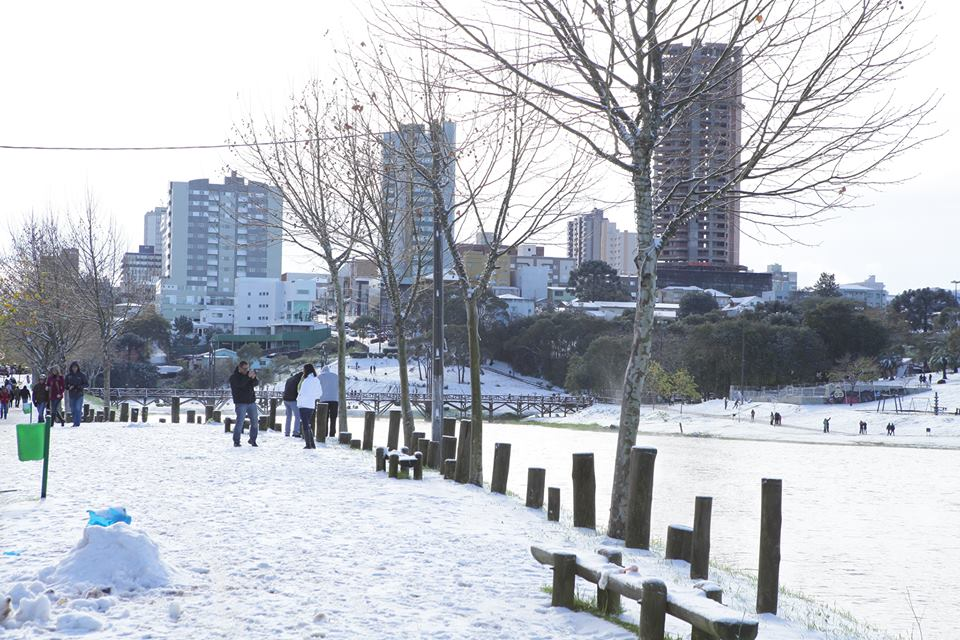
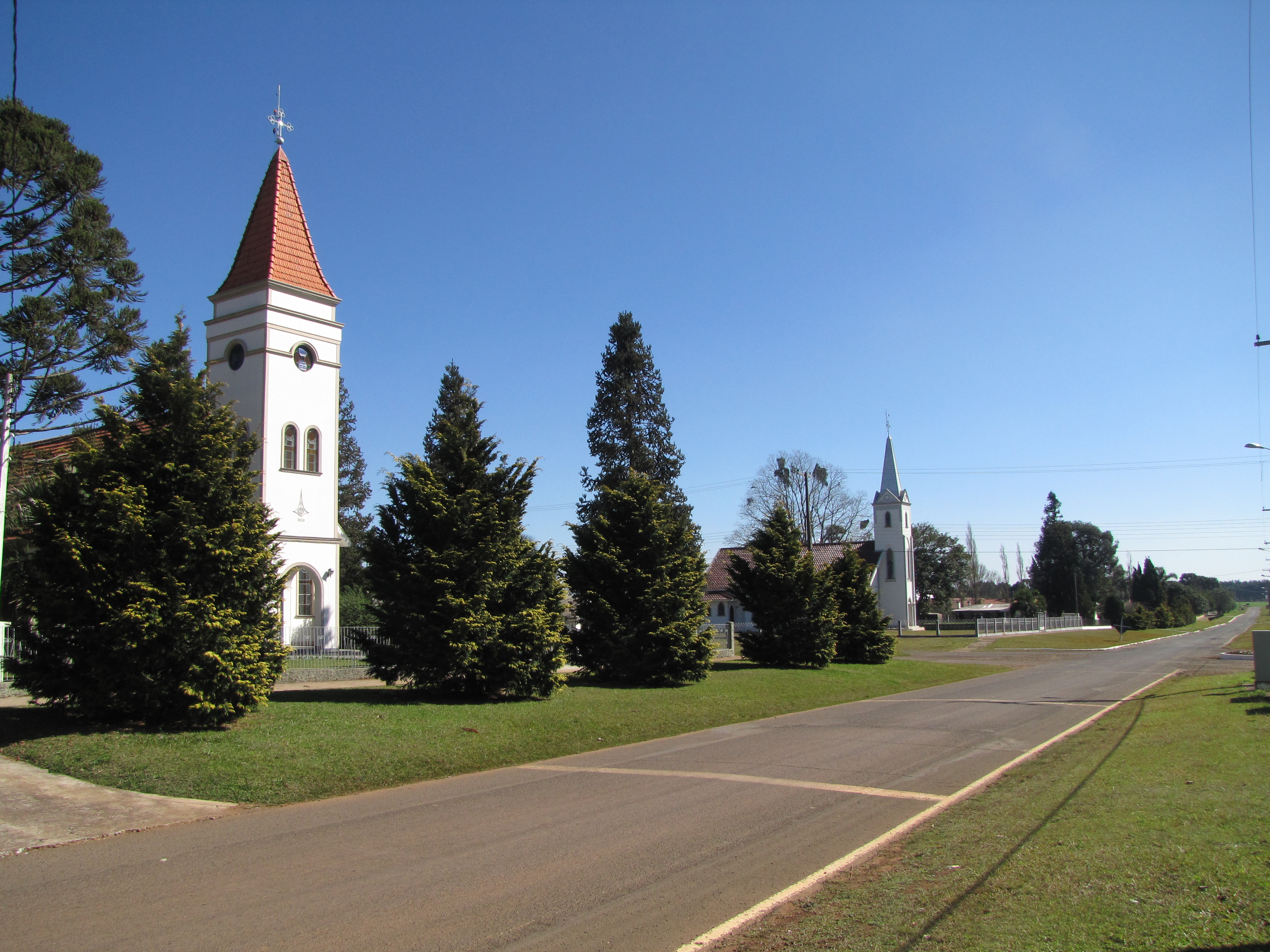
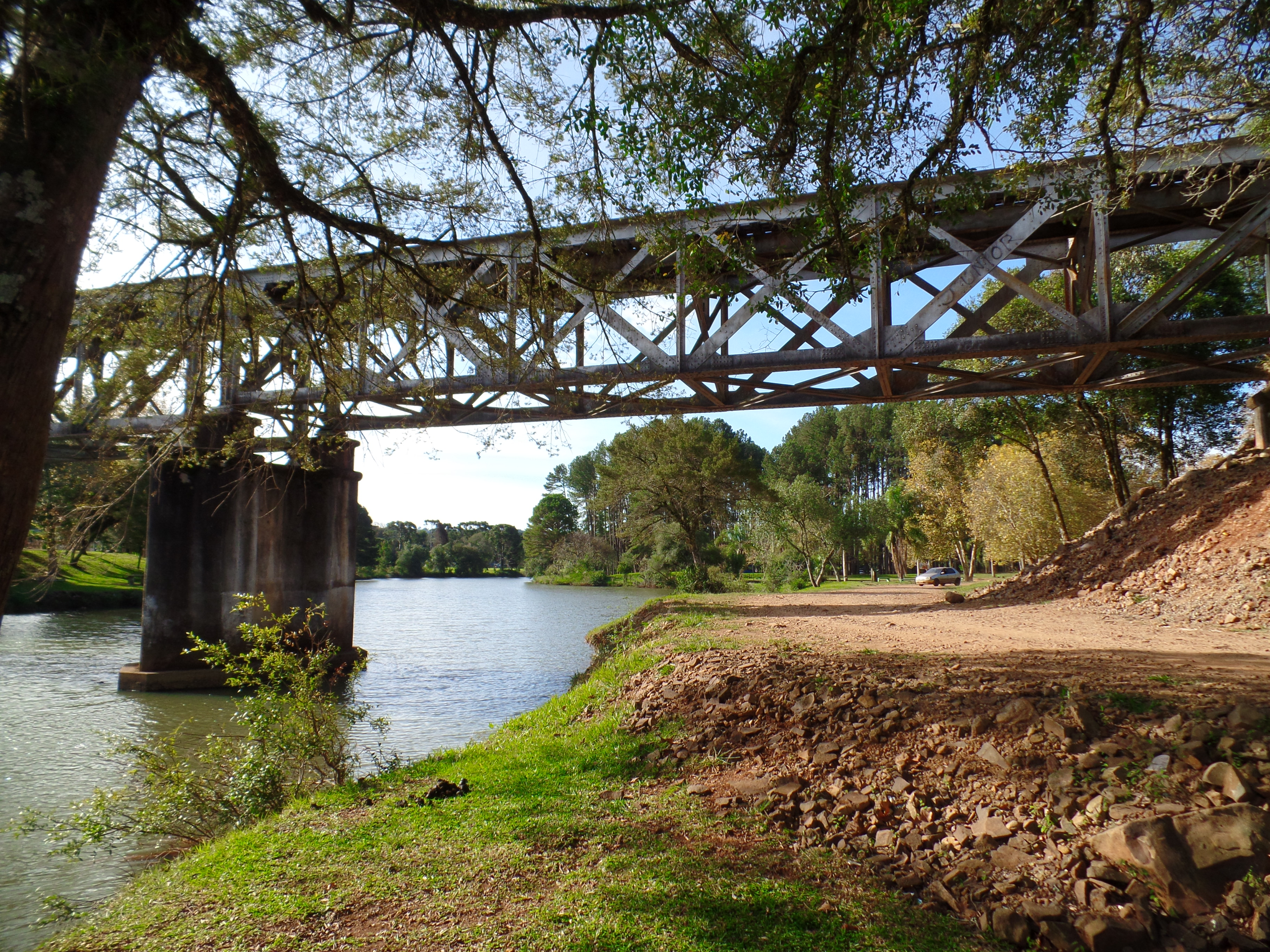
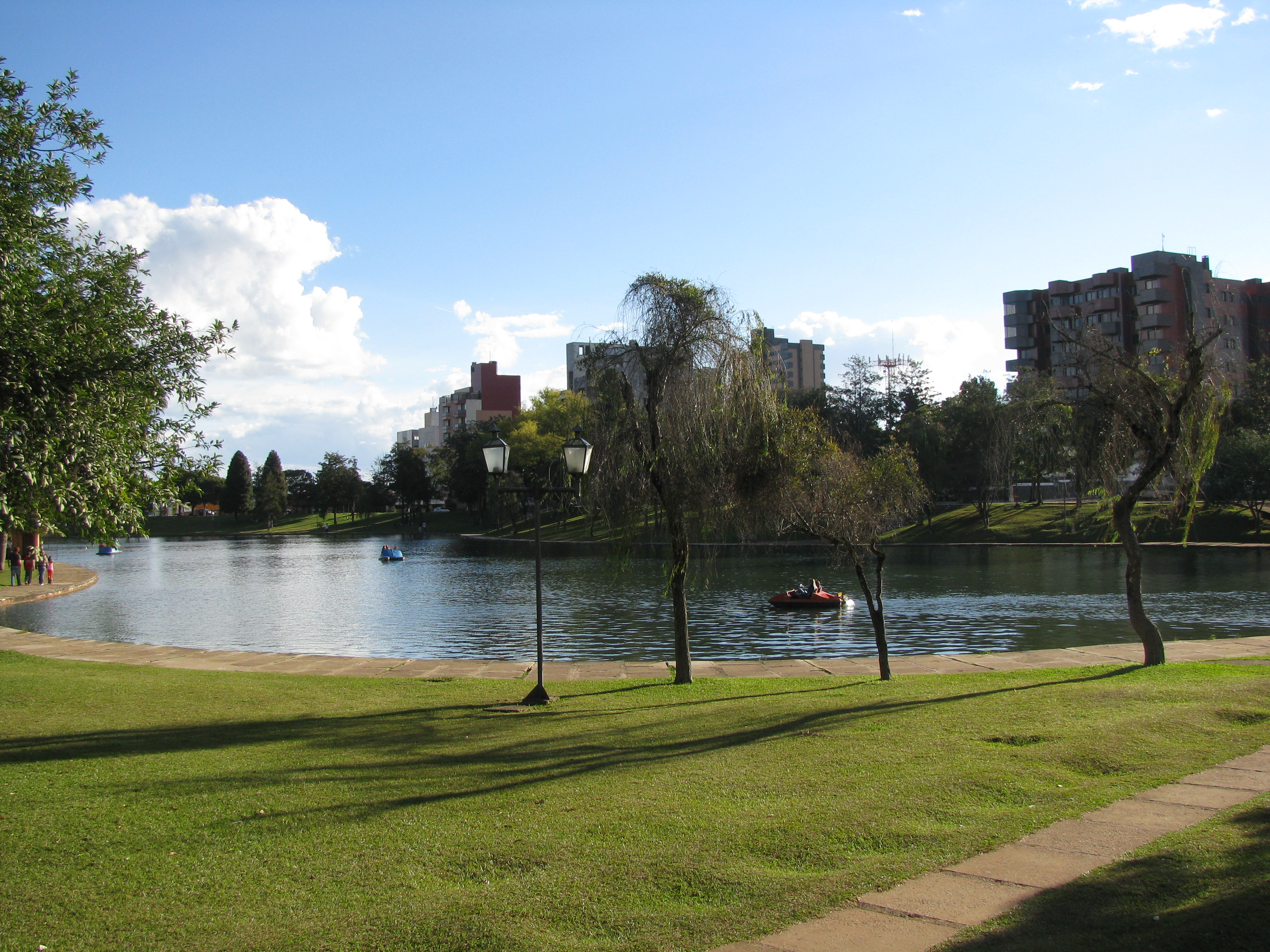
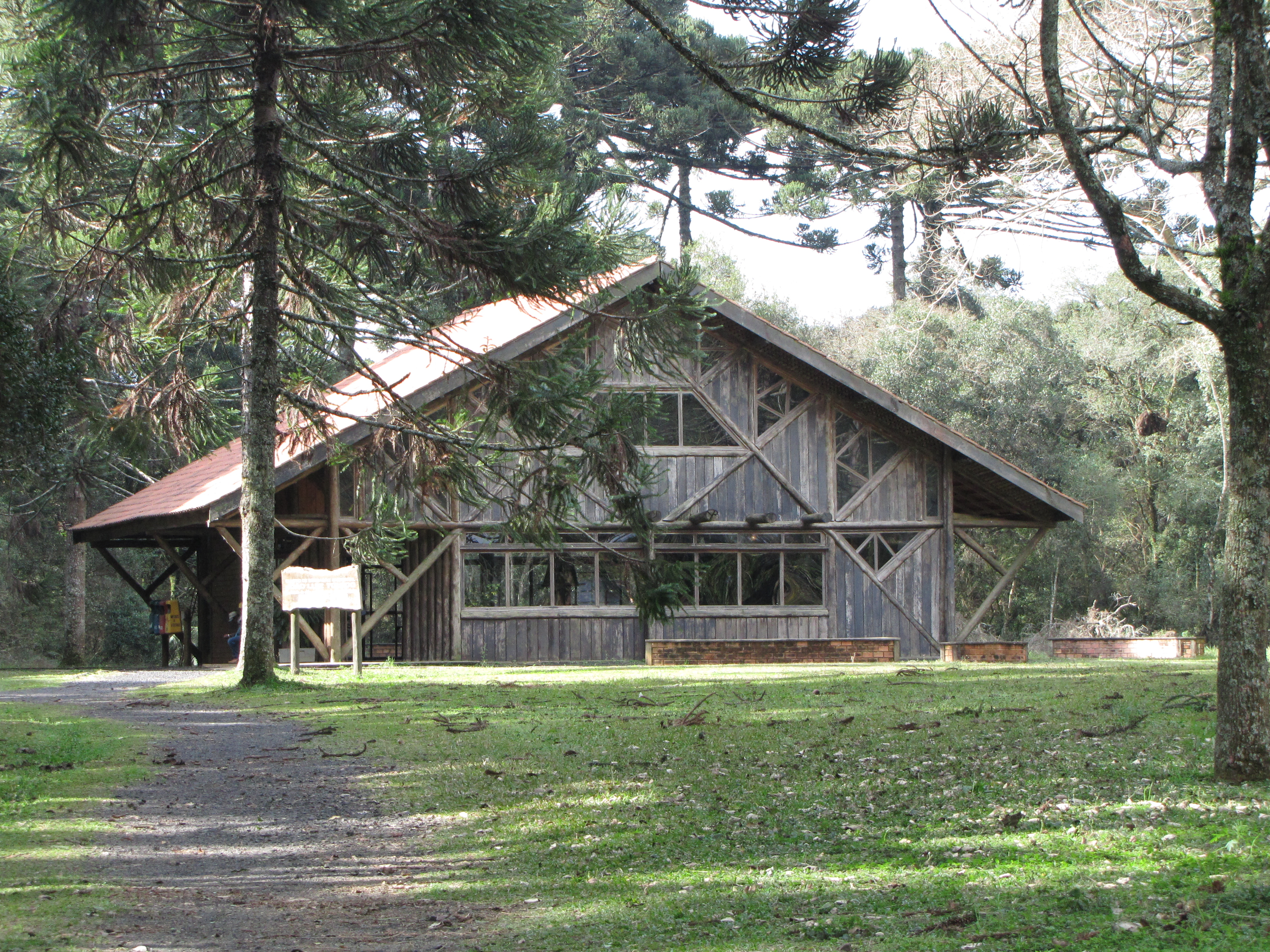
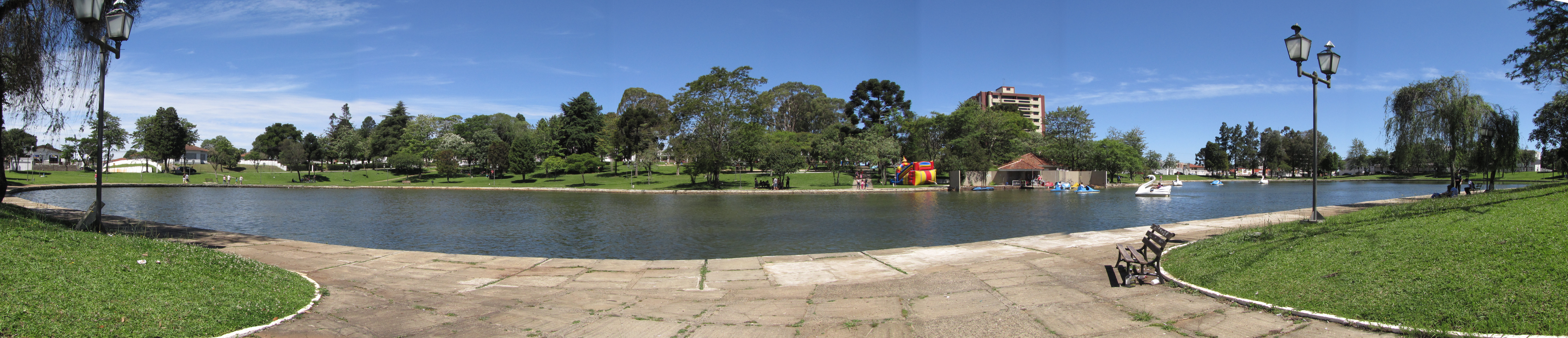

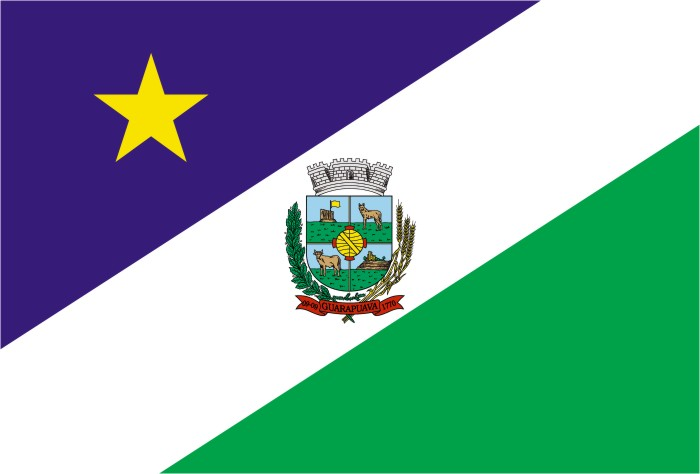
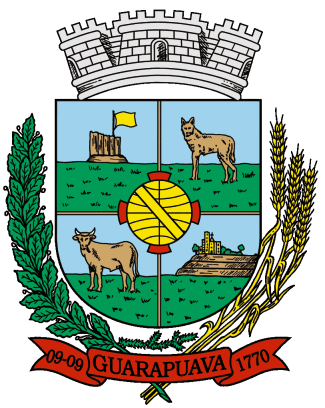
- Flag Coat of arms
- Nickname: Princesa dos Campos
- Motto(s): "Pérola do Oeste" (West Pearl) "Capital do Centro" (Capital of the Center)
- Location in Paraná

- Location within Brazil
- Coordinates: 25°23′42″S 51°27′28″W
- Country: Brazil
- Region: South
- State: Paraná
- Founded: December 9, 1810

Government
  - Mayor: Celso Fernando Góes (Cidadania)

Area
  - Total: 3,167,830 km^{2} (1,223,110 sq mi)
- Elevation: 1,120 m (3,670 ft)

Population (2022 Brazilian Census)
  - Total: 182,093
  - Estimate (2025): 189,630
  - Density: 0.0574819/km^{2} (0.148878/sq mi)
- Time zone: UTC-3 (UTC-3)
  - Summer (DST): UTC-2 (UTC-2)
- HDI (2010): 0.731 – high
- Website: guarapuava.pr.gov.br

Guarapuava is a municipality in the state of Paraná in Brazil. It is the largest municipality in that state by area. Considered a regional development hub with a strong influence on neighboring municipalities, it is also part of a railroad junction of national importance called the Mercosur corridor, between the municipalities of Foz do Iguaçu and Curitiba. It is the richest agribusiness municipality in the state of Paraná.

Guarapuava is located at 25°23'36" S and 51°27'19" W. The region is known as the centre of the state of Paraná, in the third plateau, also called the Plateau of Guarapuava. Discovered by the Portuguese in 1770, and founded in 1810, the city's name derives from tupi guarani, meaning place of Maned wolves sound (Maned wolves are called lobos-guará in Portuguese). Its elevation is 1120 m (3675 ft).

The first families to settle in the city were formed through the Tropeiros. The city also received immigrants with roots in Poland, Italy, and Germany. The city's birthday is celebrated on December 9, due to the beginning of colonization between Rio Coutinho and Rio Jordão, under the patronage of Nossa Senhora de Belém in 1819.

The city is the seat of the Roman Catholic Diocese of Guarapuava.

== History ==
Discovered by the Portuguese in 1770 and founded in 1810, the city name derives from the Língua Geral of São Paulo agûarápuaba, meaning 'place of maned wolf's sound' (gûará, Maned wolf + pu, sound/noise + aba, place). The city commemorates its anniversary on December 9, due to the onset of colonization between Rio Coutinho and the Rio Jordão in the parish of Our Lady of Bethlehem in 1819, with the demarcation of village and church.

The first villages started up near Jaguariaíva, Piraí, Furnas, Castro, and Iapó Pouso of Ponta Grossa. Cities formed along the long path south until you come near the region where it is today the City of Guarapuava.

Its urban area played an important role in its initial phase, with Chagas Father Francisco Lima starting the occupation based on aesthetic criteria, following the requirements contained in the charter of April 1, 1809, by the Count of Linhares, which determined the standards for the buildings to be constructed. As for the point-core, it refers to the Cathedral of Our Lady of Bethlehem, located at the top of the River Basin Cascavel, which was an important reference point for society of the time. The first mayor of Guarapuava was Colonel Pedro Lustosa de Siqueira.

In the year 1852, on July 17, the town of Our Lady of Bethlehem, was elevated to the category of town. On May 2, 1859, the district was created in Guarapuava, and José Antônio Araújo Vasconcelos became the first court of law. The Town of Our Lady of Bethlehem was granted city status on April 12, 1871, by Law No. 271, separating it from the municipality of Castro.

=== 2025 tornado ===
On November 7, 2025, a tornado hit Guarapuava leaving a trail of destruction, one confirmed death, and dozens injured. The Paraná Environmental Technology and Monitoring System preliminarily classified the tornado as an F3, with winds exceeding 250 km/h. Experts from PREVOTS and MetSul Meteorologia rated the tornado as an F4.

== Economy ==
The agricultural sector represents approximately 18% of the composition of GDP. The council has strong participation in agricultural production in the state. It is one of the largest producers of Maris Piper potatoes in Brazil and also a major producer of corn, soybeans, and barley. The industry has a 35% share of the GDP, and the timber industry is the industrial activity that employs the most. Manufacture of paper and cardboard, beverages, chemical byproducts, and agro-food industry also have strong participation. The service sector is growing gradually and now includes about 47% of Guarapuava's GDP.

== Education ==
In 2006, there were 68 state-run schools. Guarapuava has two public universities, the 'Universidade Estadual do Centro-Oeste' and the 'Universidade Tecnológica Federal do Paraná', and three private colleges, 'Faculdade Guarapuava', 'Centro Universitário Campo Real', and 'Faculdade Guairacá'.

== Twin town ==
Through Municipal Law 14/1988, Guarapuava has been declared a Twin Town, or Cidade Irmã, with Rastatt, a city in Germany.

== Transportation ==
The city is served by Tancredo Thomas de Farias Airport.

== Geography ==
- Altitude: 1,200 meters above sea level
- Area: 3,115.329 km^{2}
- Distance to Paranaguá: 361 km
- Distance to Curitiba: 258 km

=== Climate ===
In summer, the climate is pleasant. The highest temperature recorded is 33 °C in February 1984, and the lowest is -6.8 °C in December 1982; the precipitation is primarily caused by the warmth associated with humidity. In winter, the temperatures on some days are below 0 °C.

Climate data for Guarapuava, elevation 1,058 m (3,471 ft), (1976–2019)
Month	Jan	Feb	Mar	Apr	May	Jun	Jul	Aug	Sep	Oct	Nov	Dec	Year
Record high °C (°F)	32.0 (89.6)	33.6 (92.5)	33.0 (91.4)	31.6 (88.9)	28.8 (83.8)	25.6 (78.1)	27.4 (81.3)	31.0 (87.8)	32.8 (91.0)	33.6 (92.5)	36.0 (96.8)	33.4 (92.1)	36.0 (96.8)
Mean daily maximum °C (°F)	26.7 (80.1)	26.6 (79.9)	25.9 (78.6)	23.9 (75.0)	20.6 (69.1)	19.5 (67.1)	19.6 (67.3)	21.5 (70.7)	22.3 (72.1)	24.2 (75.6)	25.5 (77.9)	26.4 (79.5)	23.6 (74.4)
Daily mean °C (°F)	20.9 (69.6)	20.7 (69.3)	19.8 (67.6)	17.6 (63.7)	14.3 (57.7)	13.1 (55.6)	13.0 (55.4)	14.5 (58.1)	15.8 (60.4)	17.9 (64.2)	19.2 (66.6)	20.4 (68.7)	17.3 (63.1)
Mean daily minimum °C (°F)	16.8 (62.2)	16.8 (62.2)	15.7 (60.3)	13.4 (56.1)	10.2 (50.4)	8.9 (48.0)	8.4 (47.1)	9.6 (49.3)	11.1 (52.0)	13.4 (56.1)	14.5 (58.1)	15.9 (60.6)	12.9 (55.2)
Record low °C (°F)	9.0 (48.2)	7.8 (46.0)	1.0 (33.8)	−1.8 (28.8)	−3.2 (26.2)	−6.8 (19.8)	−6.0 (21.2)	−4.6 (23.7)	−4.4 (24.1)	0.8 (33.4)	3.6 (38.5)	5.8 (42.4)	−6.8 (19.8)
Average precipitation mm (inches)	204.7 (8.06)	168.9 (6.65)	142.3 (5.60)	142.0 (5.59)	162.8 (6.41)	151.7 (5.97)	125.5 (4.94)	94.9 (3.74)	166.5 (6.56)	203.6 (8.02)	163.3 (6.43)	193.4 (7.61)	1,919.6 (75.58)
Average precipitation days (≥ 1.0 mm)	16	15	13	10	11	10	10	8	11	13	12	15	144
Average relative humidity (%)	79	80	79	79	81	80	77	72	73	75	73	76	77
Mean monthly sunshine hours	195.3	173.9	202.6	193.6	182.9	173.3	200.4	216.3	184.6	191.3	200.5	200.5	2,315.2
Source: IDR-Paraná

=== Winter ===
The altitude, ranging between 1,000m and 1,200m, combined with the latitude of 25 °C, ensures a mild climate for Guarapuava most of the year. In winter there may be very cold days, the temperature may fall below the freezing point, often with frost and even snow, which guarantees the condition of the city one of the coldest cities in Brazil. The lowest temperature officially recorded in accordance with the INMET was -10.0 °C on 18 July 1975 record in the meteorological history of the city.

Note: In the same month (July 1975), according to INMET, the temperature reached -3.8 °C on the 6th, -4.0 °C on the 7th, -4.2 °C on the 17th, -6.0 °C on the 19th, and -1.2 °C on the 20th. The mean minimum temperature this month was only 3.1 °C.

Registrations of snow in the city are common, with occurrences of intense rainfall in certain years.

Snow in Guarapuava (1950–2013), according to INMET:

- July 4, 1953
- July 30, 1955
- July 20, 1957
- 19, 20 and 21 August 1965
- July 8, 1972
- 17 July 1975
- August 25, 1984
- 9 July 1994
- July 12, 2000
- July 22–23, 2013

=== Summer ===
The summer is mild, and the common temperature is below 15 °C with exceptional records of lows of 6.8 °C in December 1982 and 7.8 °C in February 1990. However, as is characteristic of summer in much of the country, the temperature can rise above 30 °C, reaching up to 33.6 °C, an absolute record registered in February 1984. In summer the rains are formed mainly by the heat associated with moisture, with the temporal order in the afternoon, sometimes with the cold fronts, dry with occasional rains from June to August.

== Statistics ==
In 2020 there were 182,644 inhabitants in Guarapuava, according to the Brazilian Institute of Geography and Statistics.

== Tourism ==
The main sights of Guarapuava are: the Cathedral of Our Lady of Bethlehem, the province of Entre Rios District, the Lake of Tears, the Park Lake, the Museum Entomological Hipólito Schneider, along with the Museum of Natural Science's collection of Prof. João José Bigarella, the Municipal Museum of Viscount Guarapuava, the Jordan Recreation Park, the Municipal Park of Araucárias, the San Francisco Municipal Park of Hope (Salto San Francisco), the Salto Curucacas, the Square of the Faith, the Teal Indian Reservation, and the Teal and Schoenstatt Shrine.

The city held a cultural event called the Cavalhadas of Guarapuava. The folklore of Cavalhadas remained alive in Guarapuava, with the participation of more than a thousand amateur actors from all social strata and age groups in the municipality. Several dramatisations were incorporated to the event, which has size of party themes, including food, games, dances, medieval circus, with the interaction of princes, sultans and medieval knights. Since 2003, it has not been performed.

== Sports ==
Guarapuava has high-level athletes, including national emphasis on sports such as shooting, cycling, football, and kickboxing. It also has significant stakes in state championships. In 2006, the Gymnasium Hall Mayor Joaquim Prestes was totally reformed and adapted to international standards, thus becoming an example for other cities of Paraná and Brazil. This reform made it possible to host various sporting events, which previously were restricted to gyms with less capacity and fewer facilities for athletes.

=== Football ===
Associação Atlética Batel, based in Batel neighborhood, is the city's football club. They competed twice in the Série C. Estádio Waldomiro Gelinski hosts the club's home games.

=== Futsal ===
The city has a representative in the Gold Cup of Futsal, the Deportivo Cellutel Tim. This championship is conducted with teams from the elite futsal paranaense. Last year the team was eliminated in the first phase. The team has a nice gym, Gym Municipal Mayor Joaquim Prestes, with more than 2,000 seats, all with chairs. The city also has a women's futsal team, which was the champion of Paranaense futsal in 2008.

=== Rugby ===
Among the various sports practiced in the city highlight the growing number of supporters of rugby. Guarapuava was the only municipality in the state that have reached, while three teams of the sport: Lobo Bravo Rugby, Guarapuava Rugby and Minotaurs Rugby Club (the two past already extinct).

Since the year 2006, the city hosted several friendly matches between local teams and teams from Curitiba, Cascavel, Londrina, Ponta Grossa and Ciudad del Este, and also promoted, in 2006, three major competitions:

- 1st. Step of First Rugby Championship of the state of Paraná - (rugby union);
- 1st. Tournament of Independence (Rugby Sevens);
- 1st. Guarapuava Cup of Rugby Seven-a-side, the last two with the participation of over one hundred athletes, not just Guarapuava, but also of Cascavel and Ponta Grossa.

Since its first edition, and traditionally, Guarapuava has hosted the 1st stage of the Rugby Championship of the state of Paraná. That tournament, growing every year, currently has the participation, besides the local team, the teams of Curitiba, Cascavel, Londrina, Ponta Grossa, Maringá and Cidade Gaúcha.

=== Kickboxing ===
Celio Rodrigues is one of the most successful athletes in the country category. He participated in several international events successfully representing his city. In May 2008 he won an international title in Croatia, and in 2009 won the world title in Guarapuava.

=== Shooting ===
Guarapuava has one of the most modern training centers for shooting sports in the country. Rodrigo Bastos, a city native, won the silver medal at the 2003 Pan American Games.

=== Chess ===
In 1991 and 1995, Guarapuava hosted the U-18 and U-16 World Chess Championships. In 1991, the events were held at the headquarters of the Guaíra Country Clube, and the U-18 section was won by Vladimir Kramnik.

== Notable people ==
- Larissa Manoela
- Marcelle Bittar
- Ana Paula Polegatch
- Welder Knaf
- Rodrigo Bastos
- Claudio Cantelli
- Sergio Rossetti Morosini
