= Hypostomus renestoi =

Scientific classification
- Domain: Eukaryota
- Kingdom: Animalia
- Phylum: Chordata
- Class: Actinopterygii
- Order: Siluriformes
- Family: Loricariidae
- Genus: Hypostomus
- Species: H. renestoi

Binomial name
- Hypostomus renestoi Zawadzki, da Silva & Troy, 2018

Species of catfish

Hypostomus renestoi is a species of catfish in the family Loricariidae. It is native to South America, where it occurs in the upper Paraguay River basin in Brazil. The species was described in 2018 by Cláudio Henrique Zawadzki, Hugmar Pains da Silva, and Waldo Pinheiro Troy alongside the redescription of Hypostomus latirostris. FishBase does not list this species.

== Etymology ==
The fish is named in honor of Brazilian ichthyologist Erasmo Renesto, of the Universidade Estadual de Maringá, because of his contributions to the genetics of neotropical fishes.
