= State University of Maringá =

University in Paraná, Brazil

- Universidade Estadual de Maringá
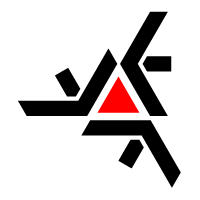
- Other name: UEM
- Type: Public university
- Established: 1969; 57 years ago
- Budget: R$ 588 million (2020)
- Rector: Leandro Vanalli
- Administrative staff: 2.248 (2019)
- Undergraduates: 21.785 (2019)
- Postgraduates: 8.404 (2019)
- Location: Maringá, PR, Brazil; 23°24′18.4″S 51°56′24.3″W
- Campus: Maringá, Goioere, Cianorte, Cidade Gaúcha and Umuarama
- Colors
- Nickname: UEM
- Website: uem.br

The State University of Maringá (Portuguese: Universidade Estadual de Maringá, UEM) is a public state university based in Maringá, in the southern Brazilian state of Paraná. Founded in 1969 and officially recognized in 1976, UEM serves as a leading institution in teaching, research, and extension throughout the region.

History

UEM was established by State Law No. 6.034, on November 6, 1969, through the integration of existing higher education institutions: the Faculties of Economic Sciences (1959), Law (1966), and Philosophy, Sciences and Letters (1966). It was organized as a public foundation by State Decree No. 18.109 on January 28, 1970, and later received federal recognition via Decree No. 77.583 on May 11, 1976. UEM transitioned into a public autarchy in 1991 under State Law No. 9.663.

From its earliest years, the university expanded its academic offerings and territorial reach. In 1986, regional campuses were established in Cianorte and Cidade Gaúcha (the Arenito campus), followed by additional campuses in Diamante do Norte (1989), Goioerê (1991), Umuarama (2002), and Vale do Ivaí in Ivaiporã (2010).

== Campus and Structure ==
The main campus covers approximately 1.24 million m² in Maringá and hosts administrative blocks, classrooms, laboratories, libraries, a music school, a sports complex, museums, a publishing house, research support facilities, a hospital, a veterinary clinic, and units such as the Universidade Aberta à Terceira Idade (UNATI). UEM has six regional campuses and maintains research and extension centers in Iguatemi (experimental farm), Porto Rico (Nupélia), and Floriano (Pisciculture Station).

UEM’s governance includes:

- The University Council (COU), the institution’s highest deliberative body, chaired by the rector and including representatives from faculty, staff, students, and the community.
- The Council of Teaching, Research and Extension (CEP), a key advisory and deliberative body for academic policies.

== Academics ==
Today, UEM offers:

- Approximately 69 in-person undergraduate programs and 7 distance-learning programs.
- Pós-graduação stricto sensu comprises around 70 programs, including 44 master’s and 26 doctoral courses.
- Lato sensu specialization offerings total about 56 courses.

Since the mid-1980s, UEM has offered graduate-level education, with its first master’s programs in Biological Sciences and Applied Chemistry (1986), and the first doctoral program starting in 1992 Universidade Estadual de Maringá. It also established an in-house academic publishing house and scientific journals, such as the Journal of Physical Education (Maringá), to disseminate its scholarly output.

== Research, Innovation, and Internationalization ==
UEM is recognized as the state university in southern Brazil with the highest volume of research activity and ranks fifth nationally by research output. Key research metrics include:

- 1,267 scientific initiation projects, with over 1,100 student participants.
- 624 faculty-led research projects and 238 research groups registered with CNPq.
- Infrastructure support through 442 laboratories, 146 faculty productivity grants, and a pipeline of patents and intellectual property, including 16 granted patents, 30 registered software, and applications for brands and patent filings.

International collaborations and outputs are significant, with 10,159 indexed international publications in leading databases (4,259 in Web of Science and 5,900 in Scopus) over the past five years. UEM maintains partnerships with 156 universities across 34 countries on five continents.

== Community Engagement and Cultural Outreach ==
UEM’s health complex, anchored by the Regional University Hospital of Maringá (HUM), provides extensive public healthcare services including pediatrics, surgery, obstetrics, and emergency care, benefiting over 60,700 individuals annually and managing extensive lab tests, donations, and patient admissions. Extension and cultural activities reach a broad audience:

- Over 663,000 individuals reached via extension projects.
- 63,948 beneficiaries across 332 extension events.
- 23,800 participants in 138 cultural initiatives involving theatre, music, visual arts, and more.
- Institutional arts groups include chorals, museums (like MUDI), dance and theater groups, orchestras, and visual arts collectives.

The Museu Dinâmico Interdisciplinar (MUDI) serves as an interdisciplinary, interactive educational museum, founded in the mid-1980s and gaining official status in 2016. MUDI addresses themes ranging from health and environmental awareness to scientific literacy and artistic engagement.

The Núcleo de Pesquisas em Limnologia, Ictiologia e Aquicultura (Nupélia), founded in 1983, conducts long-term ecological research on aquatic ecosystems, notably through monitoring riverine environments including the Paraná River floodplain.

== Rankings and Recognition ==
In the 2024 Folha University Ranking (RUF), UEM scored 83.35 points and was recognized as the top state university in southern Brazil and among the five best in the country. It ranked second among Paraná institutions—after UFPR—and led the state’s public university network.

== See also ==
- Brazil University Rankings
- List of state universities in Brazil
- Universities and Higher Education in Brazil
