= Hypostomus latirostris =

Scientific classification
- Domain: Eukaryota
- Kingdom: Animalia
- Phylum: Chordata
- Class: Actinopterygii
- Order: Siluriformes
- Family: Loricariidae
- Genus: Hypostomus
- Species: H. latirostris

Binomial name
- Hypostomus latirostris (Regan, 1904)

Synonyms
- Plecostomus latirostris

Species of catfish

Hypostomus latirostris is a species of catfish in the family Loricariidae. It is native to South America, where it occurs in the Paraguay River basin in Brazil and Paraguay. The species reaches 26 cm (10.2 inches) in total length and is believed to be a facultative air-breather. While initially described by Charles Tate Regan in 1904, it was redescribed in 2018 by Cláudio Henrique Zawadzki, Hugmar Pains da Silva, and Waldo Pinheiro Troy alongside the description of the species Hypostomus renestoi.
