= Nikolaos Antoniadis =

Greek sport shooter

Personal information
- Full name: Nikolaos Antoniadis
- Nickname: Nikos
- Nationality: Greece
- Born: 3 January 1971 (age 55) Xanthi, Greece
- Height: 1.72 m (5 ft 7 1/2 in)
- Weight: 80 kg (176 lb)

Sport
- Sport: Shooting
- Event: Trap (TR125)
- Club: Shooting Federation of Greece
- Coached by: Timur Matoian

Nikolaos Antoniadis (Greek: Νικόλαος Αντωνιάδης; born 3 January 1971) is a Greek sport shooter. He placed thirty-first in trap shooting at the 2004 Summer Olympics, representing the host nation Greece. Antoniadis also serves as a member of the Shooting Federation of Greece, where he trains full-time under head coach Timur Matoian.

Filling out one of Olympic places reserved to the host nation, Antoniadis was named as part of the Greek shooting team in the men's trap at the 2004 Summer Olympics in Athens. Less experienced to the sport, Antoniadis fired 110 out of 125 targets to end up in thirty-first from a field of thirty-five shooters, failing to advance to the final.
