= Leonardo Drugovich =

Brazilian footballer

Personal information
- Date of birth: 21 April 1989 (age 37)
- Place of birth: Maringá, Brazil
- Height: 1.88 m (6 ft 2 in)
- Position: Forward

Senior career*
Years	Team	Apps	(Gls)
2000–2001	Racing de Santander		
2001	Cerro Porteño		
2002	Joinville		
2003–2004	Marília		
2005–2007	Universidad de Concepción		
- * Club domestic league appearances and goals

Leonardo Drugovich (born 21 April 1989 in Maringá, Brazil) is a Brazilian former professional footballer who played as a midfielder for clubs in Brazil, Chile, Paraguay and Spain.

== Clubs ==
- Racing de Santander 2000–2001
- Cerro Porteño 2001
- Joinville 2002
- Marilia 2003–2004
- Universidad de Concepción 2005–2007
