= Lobo Bravo Rugby =

(Brazil) Lobo Bravo Rugby
- Full name: Associação Lobo Bravo Rugby Clube
- Union: Brazilian Rugby Association
- Nickname(s): Lobo Bravo, LBR, Lobos
- Founded: 2003
- Location: Guarapuava, Paraná, Brazil
- Chairman: (Brazil) Waldir F. Reccanello
- Coach: (Brazil) Aurélio Spegel
- Captain: (Brazil) Mario Cesar Iastrenski
1st kit	2nd kit

Official website
- lobobravorugby.blogspot.com

Lobo Bravo Rugby is a nonprofit civil association which has, as main goal, spread the rugby practice in central and southern Paraná, especially in the city of Guarapuava, its headquarters.

== History ==
Thanks to the transmission of the Rugby World Cup, on 20 October 2003 was the first training of Lobo Bravo Rugby, the principle in the Plaza of Ukraine, which local, being public, has enough visibility of the sport practice.

In 2005 the Bravo Lobo Rugby became an association duly registered with the competent bodies.

== Main Titles ==
Senior Male Team:

- 2011 - Rugby Championship of the state of Paraná - 2nd
- 2010 - Rugby Championship of the state of Paraná - 3rd
- 2009 - XV Ten-a-side del Mercosur CATARATAS (Puerto Iguazú, Argentina) - 6th
- 2009 - Rugby Championship of the state of Paraná - 3rd
- 2009 - Brazilian Rugby Sevens Circuit (Curitiba) - 6th
- 2008 - Rugby Championship of the state of Paraná - 2nd
- 2008 - Brazilian Rugby Sevens Circuit (Curitiba) - 6th
- 2008 - International Rugby Cup of Cascavel (rugby sevens) - 5th
- 2007 - Rugby Championship of the state of Paraná - 3rd
- 2007 - Brazilian Southern Rugby Championship - 4th
- 2006 - Rugby Championship of the state of Paraná - 3rd
- 2005 - Brazilian Rugby Sevens Circuit (Florianópolis) - 11th

Senior Female Team:

- 2006 - Brazilian Rugby Sevens Circuit (Florianópolis) - 5th

Junior Male Team:

- 2010 - Brazilian Rugby Sevens Circuit (Curitiba) - 6th
- 2006 - Rugby Sevens Cup of São Paulo Athletic Club - 5th

== Uniform ==
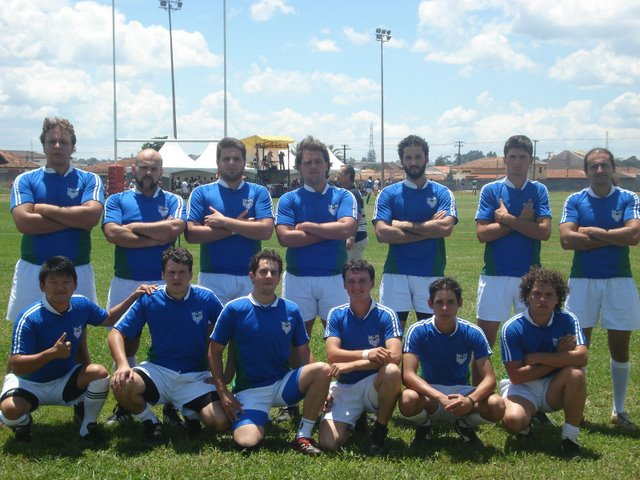

After a period using the entirely blue marine shirts, currently the Rugby Lobo Bravo has two uniforms:

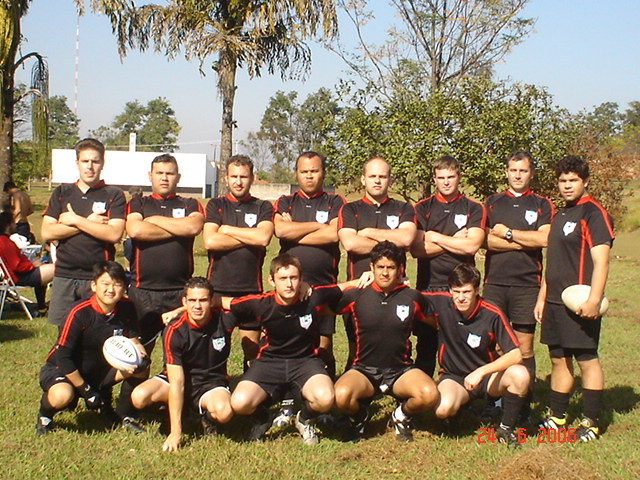

- Uniform 1: black with red stripes and necks (two stripes on the sides and shoulders), black shorts, black socks. There is at the chest on the left, the shield of the team, in the colors of the flag of Guarapuava.
- Uniforme 2: mostly blue with green side details, and two white stripes on the shoulders, white shorts, white socks. There is at the chest on the left, the shield of the team, in the colors of the flag of Guarapuava.

== Training places ==
Currently Lobo Bravo Rugby hold their training every Saturday at the Quarter of the 26th Artillery Group of the Campaign. During the week, the drills are conducted in Lake Park.
