= Petri Nummela =

Finnish sport shooter

Personal information
- Full name: Petri Nummela
- Nationality: Finland
- Born: 17 June 1971 (age 55) Hollola, Finland
- Height: 1.78 m (5 ft 10 in)
- Weight: 76 kg (168 lb)

Sport
- Sport: Shooting
- Event: Trap (TR125)
- Club: Lahden Ampumaseura
- Coached by: Matti Nummela

Petri Nummela (born 17 June 1971 in Hollola) is a Finnish sport shooter. He was selected to compete for Finland at the 2004 Summer Olympics, finishing fourteenth in trap shooting. Having pursued the sport since the age of fourteen, Nummela trained full-time for Lahti Shooting Club (Finnish: Lahden Ampumaseura) in Lahti under his personal coach and brother Matti Nummela.

Nummela qualified for the Finnish squad in the men's trap at the 2004 Summer Olympics in Athens. Few months before the Games, he finished third at the World Cup meet in Sydney to occupy the Olympic quota place won by his compatriot Tommi Andelin, who had attained a minimum qualifying score of 120, from the 2002 World Championships in Lahti. Nummela got off to a powerful start by firing 73 out of 75 targets to secure a top finish on the first day, but his final rounds of a perfect 25 and a dismal 19-clay pigeon hit on the following day left him out from the top of the leaderboard to share a fourteenth-place tie with four other shooters, tallying a total record of 117.
