= Maringá =

Municipality in Paraná, Brazil

- Municipality
- Municipality of Maringá
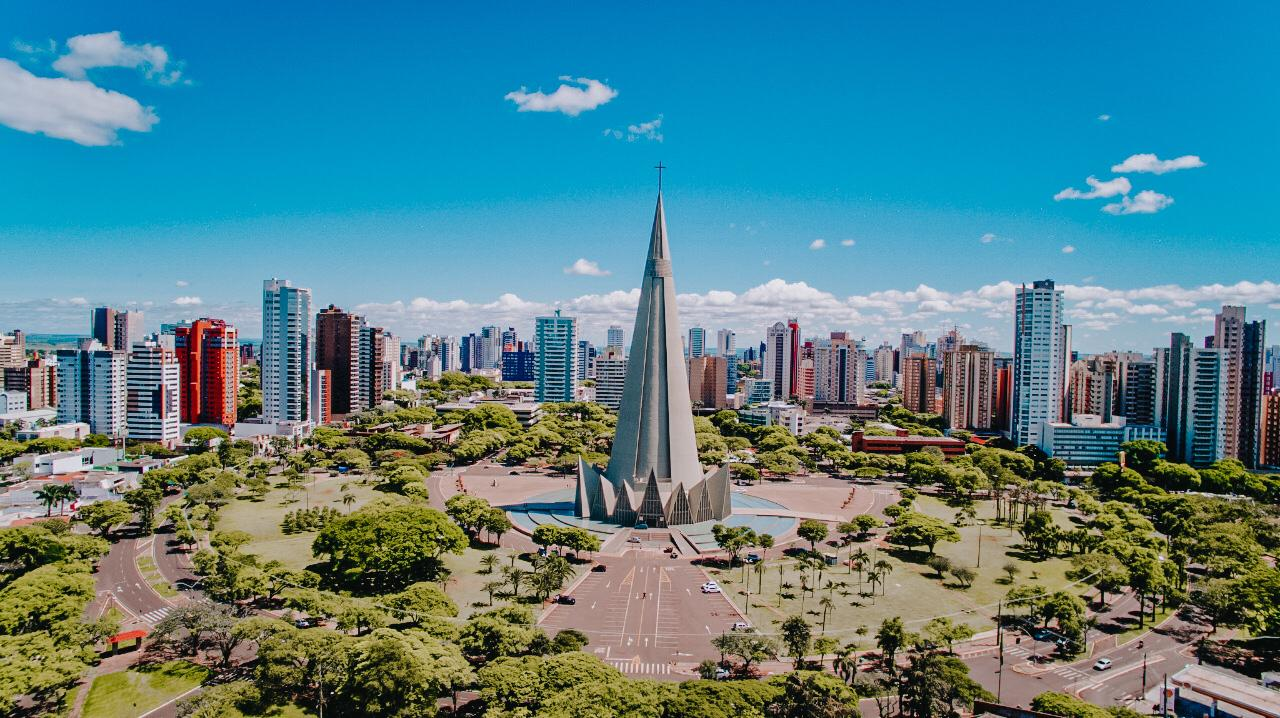
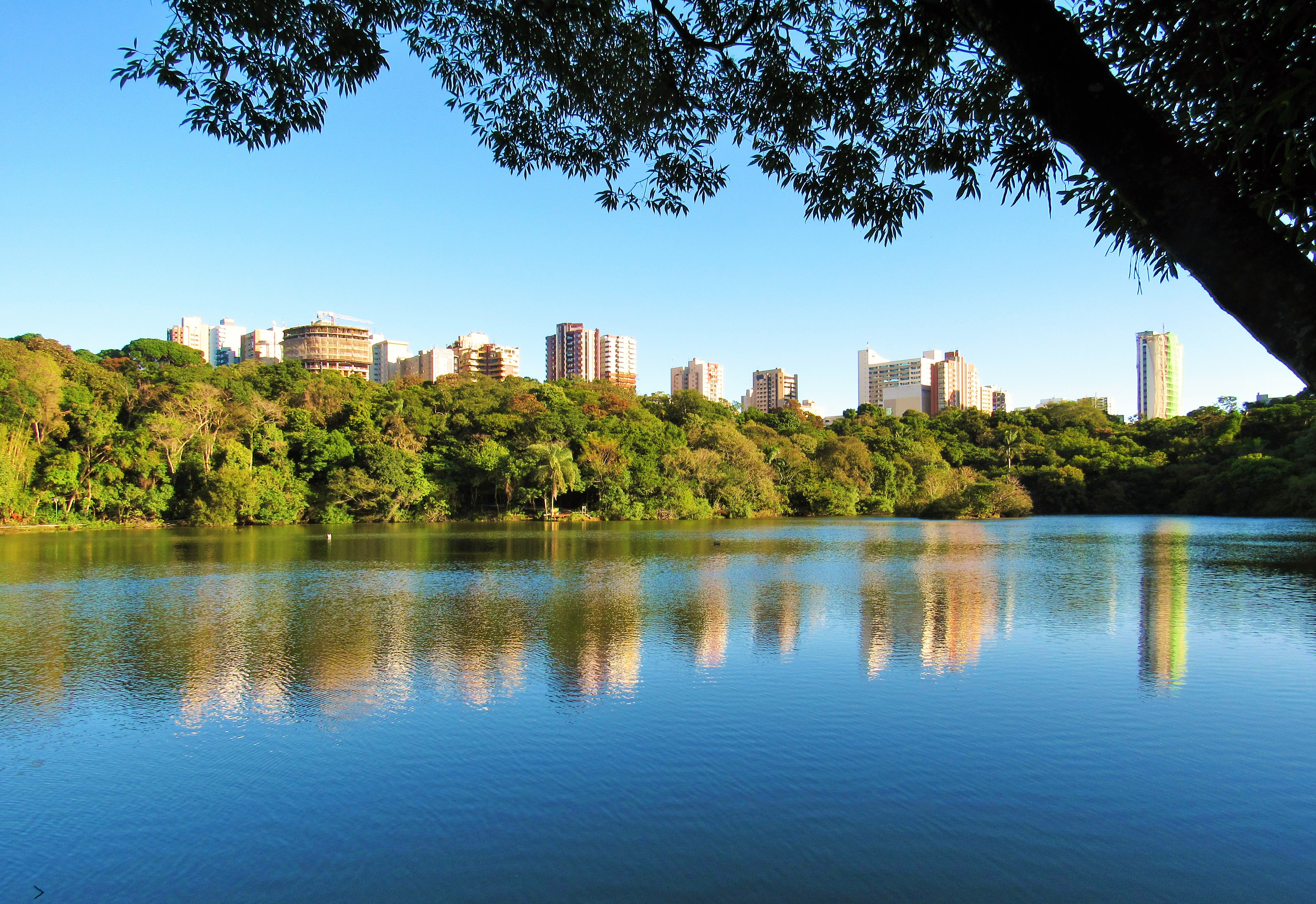
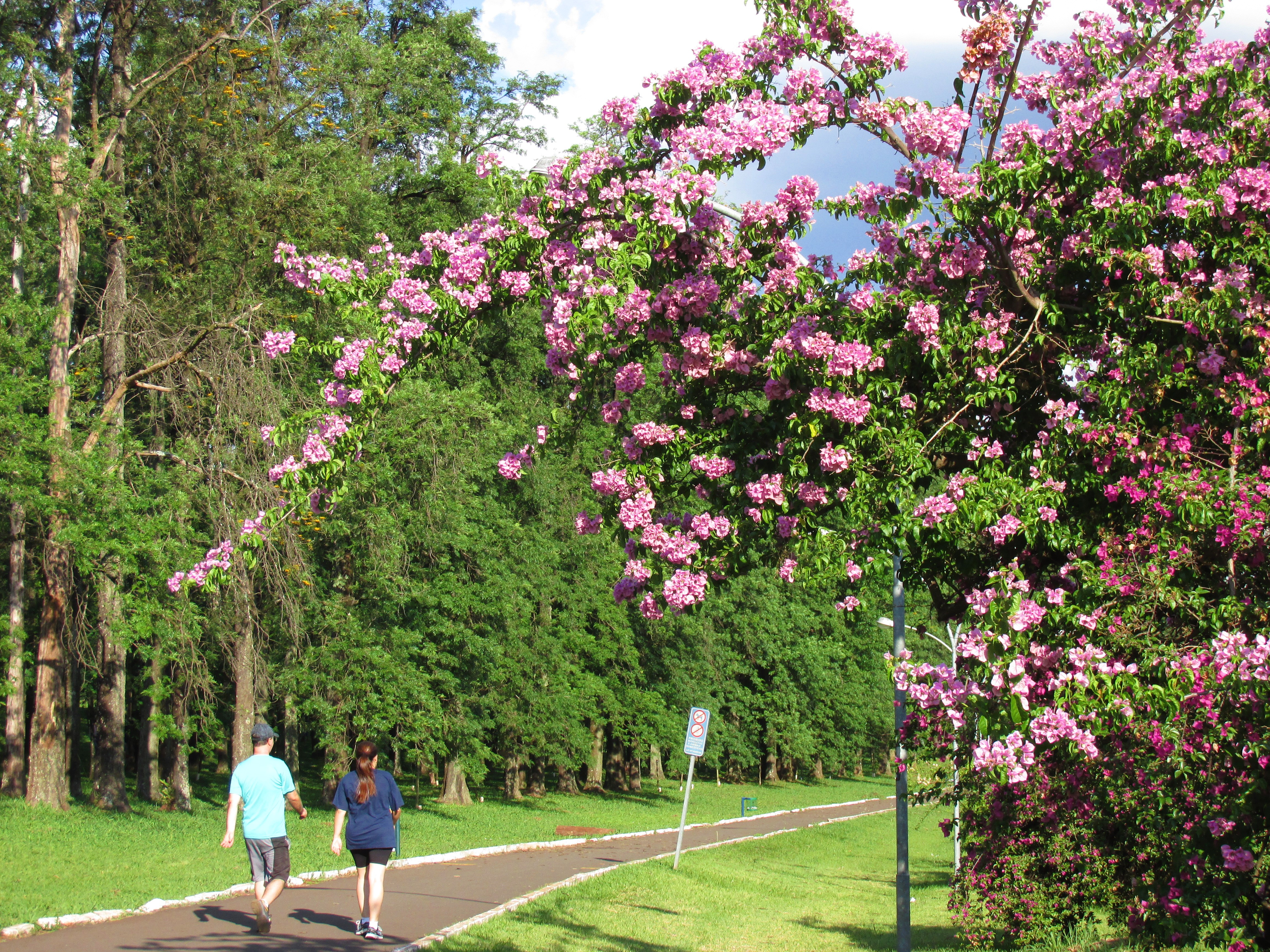
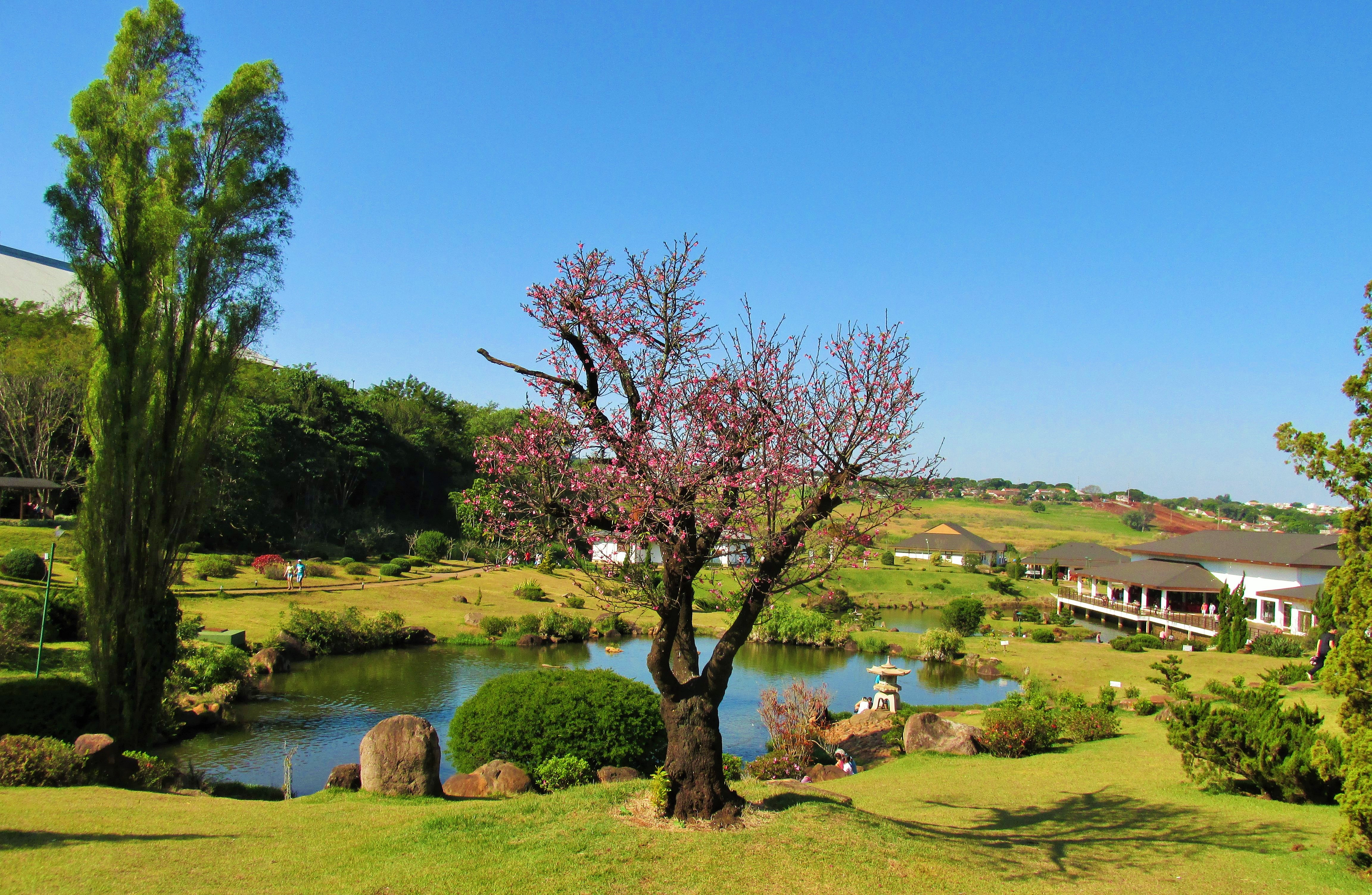
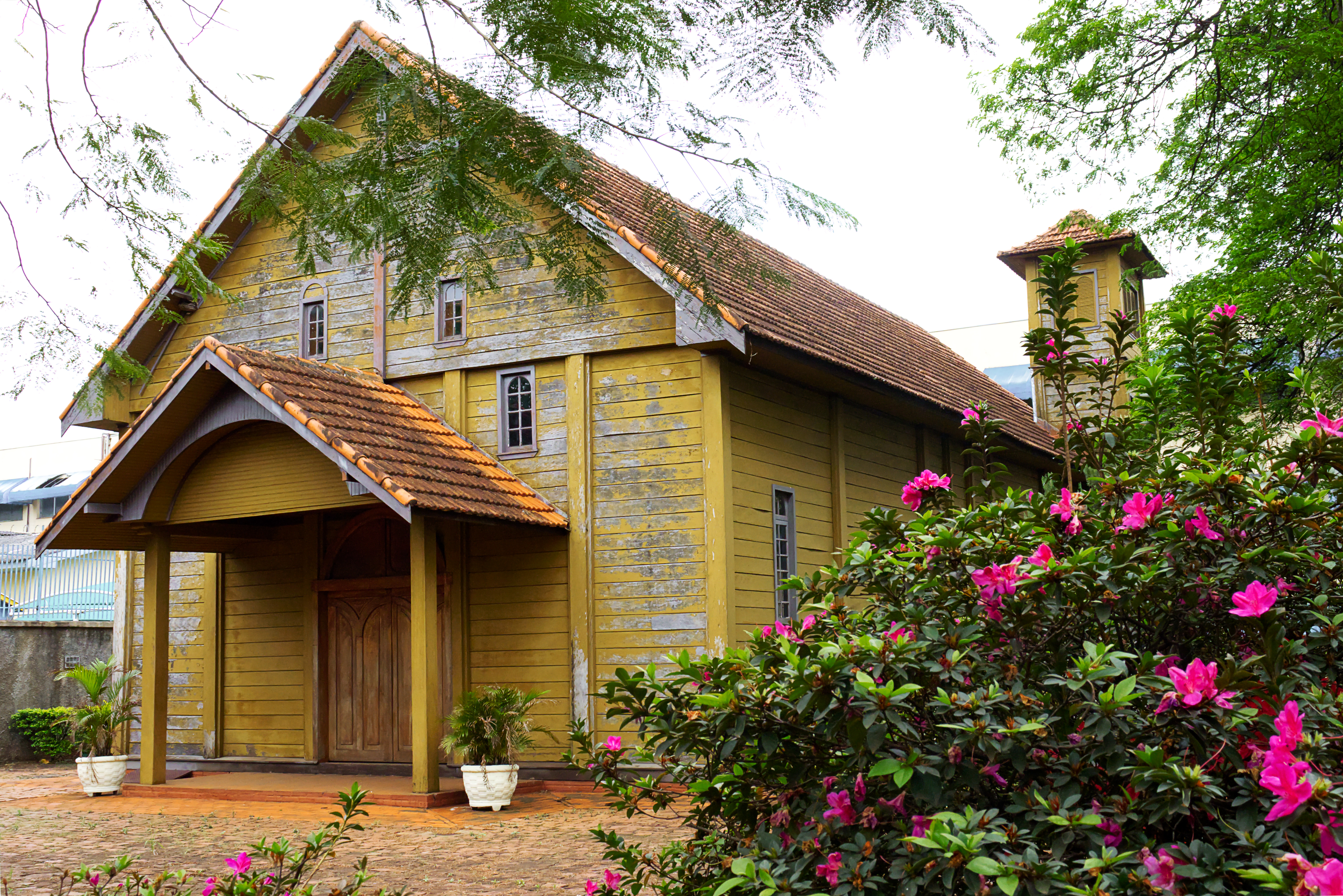
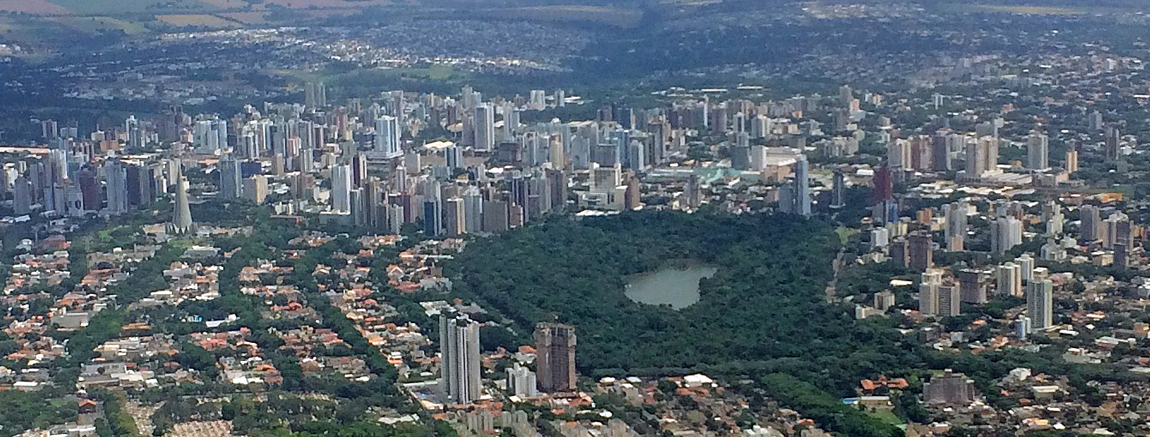
- From left to right and top to bottom: skyline of Maringá with the Cathedral of Maringá; the Ingá Park; Grevilea Woods; Park of Japan; Chapel of Santa Cruz de Maringá

- Flag Coat of arms
- Nicknames: Song City (Cidade Canção), Green City (Cidade Verde)
- Location in Paraná

- Location in Brazil
- Coordinates: 23°24′S 51°55′W
- Country: Brazil
- Region: South
- State: Paraná
- Founded: May 10, 1947

Government
  - Mayor: Silvio Barros

Area
  - Municipality: 487.93 km^{2} (188.39 sq mi)
  - Metro: 5,978.592 km^{2} (2,308.347 sq mi)
- Elevation: 515 m (1,690 ft)

Population (2022)
  - Municipality: 409,657
  - Estimate (2025): 429,660
  - Density: 731.9/km^{2} (1,896/sq mi)
  - Metro: 783,907
- Time zone: UTC-3 (UTC-3)
- Postal Code: 87000-000
- HDI (2010): 0.808 – very high
- Website: maringa.pr.gov.br

Maringá (Brazilian Portuguese pronunciation: [maɾĩˈɡa]) is a municipality in southern Brazil founded on 10 May 1947 as a planned urban area. It is the third largest city in the state of Paraná, with 429,660 inhabitants in the city proper (IBGE 2025). Located in northwestern Paraná, and crossed by the Tropic of Capricorn, it is a regional centre for commerce, services, agro-industries, and universities, including the State University of Maringá.

== History ==
=== Toponymy ===
Maringá takes its name from a song by Joubert de Carvalho, written about a woman named Maria do Ingá, a name later shortened to Maringá. When the settlement was established, the song was highly popular among the pioneers and planners, who adopted its title for the new city. As a result, Maringá became known as the "Cidade Canção", which translates to something along the lines of "Song City".

=== Settlement ===
In 1925, the Northern Paraná Land Company was established in London, England and was responsible for the management of more than 500,000 acres (2,000 km^{2}) in the northern part of the State, which today contains some of the largest cities in Paraná.

The region's fertile land encouraged São Paulo colonists to move in and acquire new areas for the production of coffee beans, an important product for export. The northern region of Paraná encloses nearly 100 thousand km2 and is watered by the Paranapanema, Paraná, Ivaí and Piquiri rivers. The urban project commissioned by the British company (Melhoramentos Co.) and designed by the city planner Jorge Macedo Vieira, defined the outlines of the new city. Maringá received the status of municipality on 14 November 1951.

Concerned about deforestation caused by the urban development layout, the company reserved three large forest areas within the urban limits: the Horto Florestal, the Ingá Park, and Bosque II. As a result, the city was planned as a "garden city" from the beginning.

== Demography ==
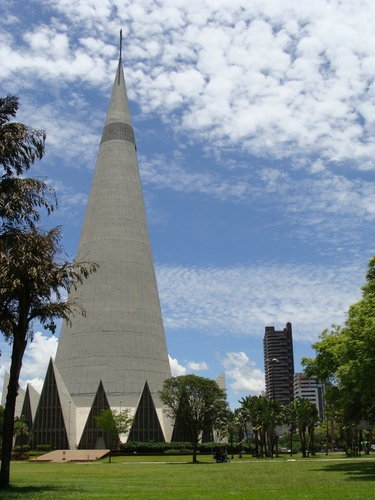
The Cathedral of Maringá, the city's most famous landmark, was completed in 1972. At 124 metres (407 ft), it is the tallest church building in South America.

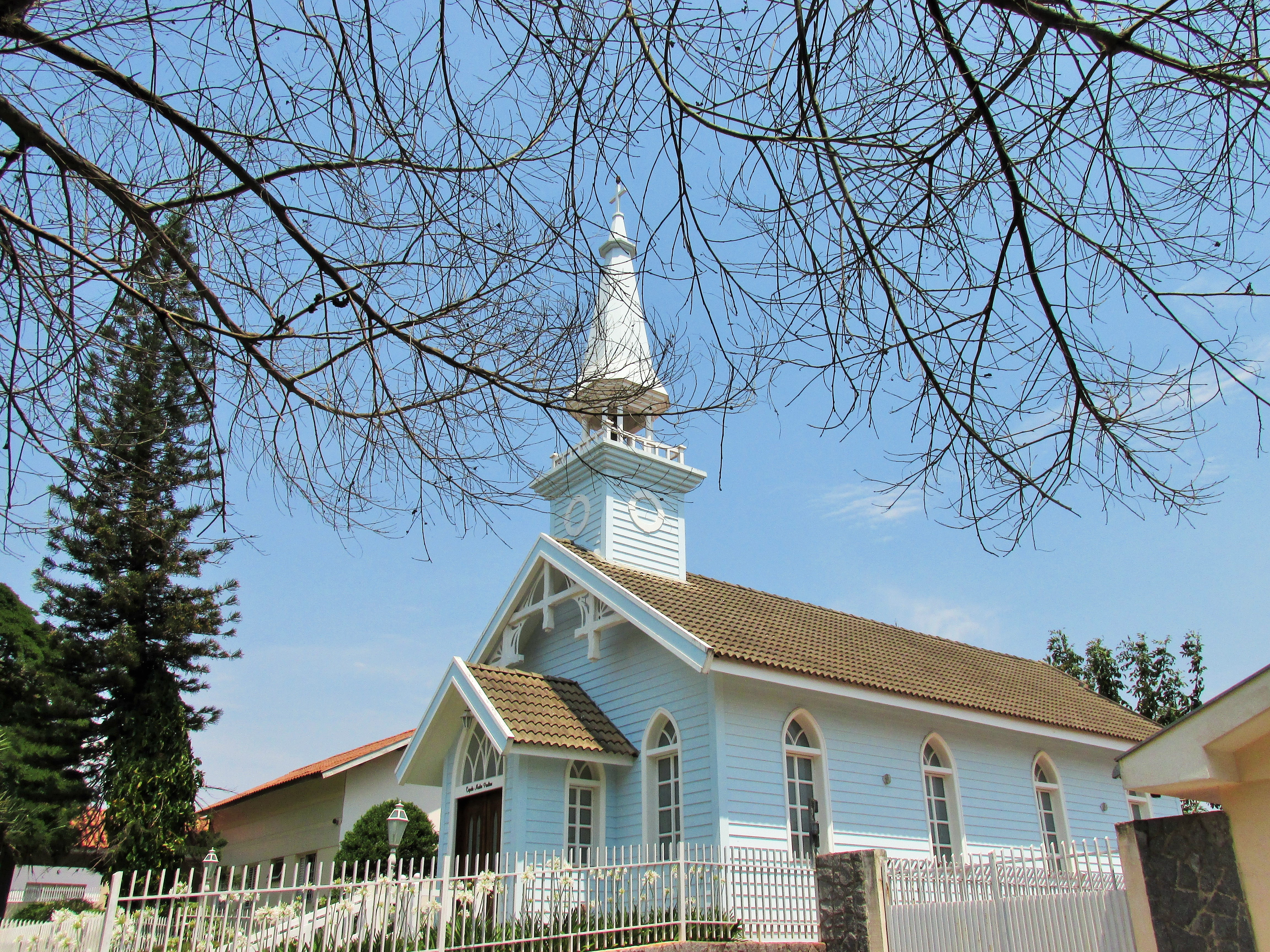
Madre Paulina Chapel.

=== Ethnicity ===
The region of Maringá has been greatly influenced by Japanese immigrants, alongside Italian and German immigrants. Portuguese descendants also have a considerable presence in the city. Other prevalent ethnic groups are African and Amerindian descendants, Poles, Spaniards, Ukrainians, Arabs, Jews, Russians, and a small group of British descendants.

Distribution of the population living in Maringá according to race or skin color:

Color/Race	Percentage
White	70.8%
Mixed	19.6%
Asian	3.6%
Black	3.4%
Amerindian	0.1%

Source: Census 2012

=== Religion ===
Roman Catholicism is the single largest religious denomination in the city; other major denominations include the various branches of Protestantism, and also Islam, Buddhism, Shinto, Spiritism, among others. Roman Catholics are the majority and have remained constant, while Protestants have grown 2.41%, and those who do not profess a religion have dropped to 2.03%.

- Roman Catholicism: 73.72%
- Protestantism: 21.15%
- Islam, Buddhism, Spiritism, Atheism and others: 5.13%.

Source: Observatório das Metrópoles UFRJ.

== Geography ==
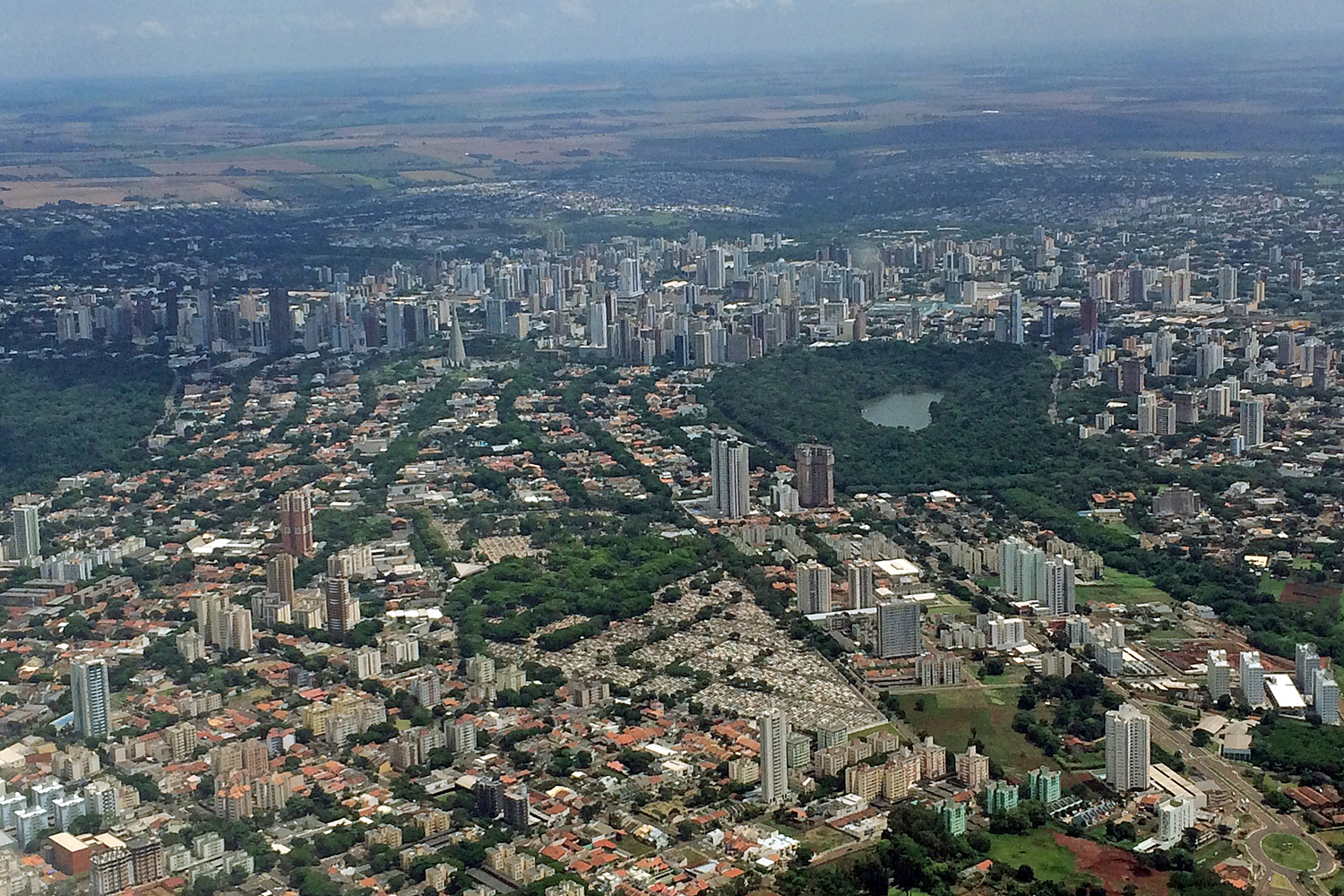
Aerial view of Maringá.

=== Climate ===
Maringá experiences a tropical rainforest climate (Af, according to Köppen) bordering on a tropical monsoon climate (Am). It has well distributed rainfall, where the average temperature of the coldest month is around 17.8 °C (64 °F) and average annual temperatures around 21.95 °C (71.51 °F). Because of its location, situated in southern Brazil and crossed by the Tropic of Capricorn, the region of Maringá is influenced by several macro-climatic factors caused by migration of air masses from the Atlantic Ocean and from the Tropical zone. In the winter the infiltration of cold air from the polar front is relatively common, and frosts can occur.

Climate data for Maringá (1991–2020 normals, extremes 1961–1990)
Month	Jan	Feb	Mar	Apr	May	Jun	Jul	Aug	Sep	Oct	Nov	Dec	Year
Record high °C (°F)	39.1 (102.4)	37.8 (100.0)	36.0 (96.8)	34.0 (93.2)	32.0 (89.6)	30.2 (86.4)	31.4 (88.5)	34.0 (93.2)	37.2 (99.0)	40.7 (105.3)	39.4 (102.9)	37.4 (99.3)	40.7 (105.3)
Mean daily maximum °C (°F)	30.4 (86.7)	30.5 (86.9)	30.4 (86.7)	28.8 (83.8)	25.1 (77.2)	24.3 (75.7)	24.7 (76.5)	27.1 (80.8)	28.5 (83.3)	29.8 (85.6)	30.3 (86.5)	30.4 (86.7)	28.4 (83.1)
Daily mean °C (°F)	25.0 (77.0)	24.9 (76.8)	24.6 (76.3)	23.0 (73.4)	19.6 (67.3)	18.7 (65.7)	18.6 (65.5)	20.6 (69.1)	22.2 (72.0)	23.7 (74.7)	24.4 (75.9)	25.0 (77.0)	22.5 (72.5)
Mean daily minimum °C (°F)	20.9 (69.6)	20.8 (69.4)	20.2 (68.4)	18.6 (65.5)	15.5 (59.9)	14.7 (58.5)	14.2 (57.6)	15.6 (60.1)	17.1 (62.8)	18.8 (65.8)	19.4 (66.9)	20.5 (68.9)	18.0 (64.4)
Record low °C (°F)	10.0 (50.0)	12.0 (53.6)	9.0 (48.2)	3.6 (38.5)	1.8 (35.2)	0.1 (32.2)	0.0 (32.0)	−0.2 (31.6)	1.5 (34.7)	9.0 (48.2)	9.0 (48.2)	9.0 (48.2)	−0.2 (31.6)
Average precipitation mm (inches)	226.0 (8.90)	200.8 (7.91)	154.5 (6.08)	112.9 (4.44)	118.7 (4.67)	103.5 (4.07)	72.9 (2.87)	66.8 (2.63)	124.2 (4.89)	173.0 (6.81)	154.0 (6.06)	194.9 (7.67)	1,702.2 (67.02)
Average precipitation days (≥ 1.0 mm)	14	12	10	7	7	6	5	5	7	10	9	12	104
Average relative humidity (%)	82.9	82.8	83.2	81.9	78.6	71.9	67.2	64.0	68.0	71.6	76.9	80.6	75.8
Mean monthly sunshine hours	212.1	199.6	225.0	222.2	199.9	193.4	224.0	238.6	211.4	218.1	231.8	219.7	2,595.8
Source: Instituto Nacional de Meteorologia

=== Flora ===
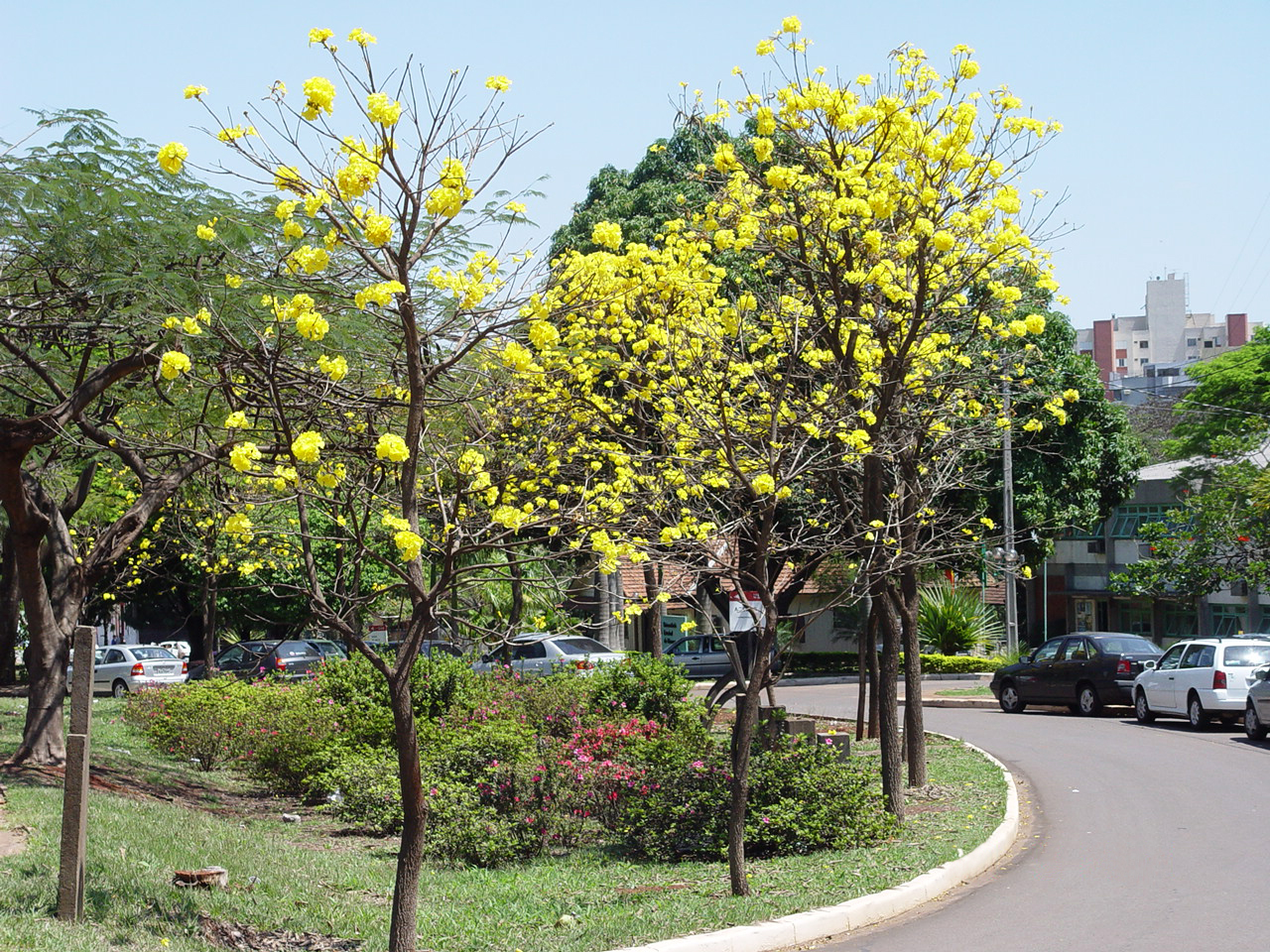
Handroanthus serratifolius

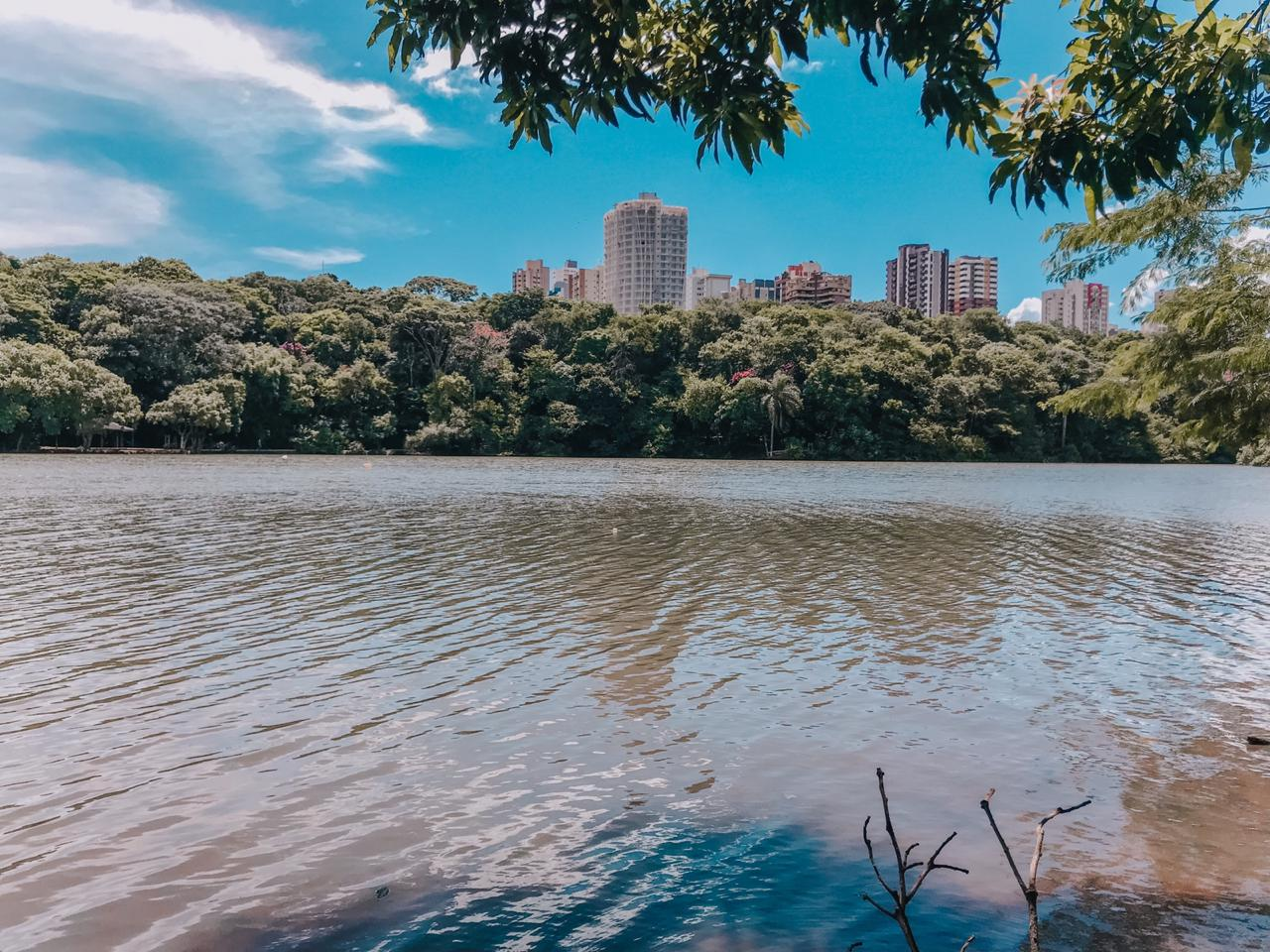
Ingá Lake

Maringá has a high rate of concentration of green area per capita, there are 90 acres (360,000 m^{2}) of native forest in 17 preserved areas.

The city preserves within its limits large areas of native forest in the Horto Florestal, Parque dos Pioneiros (Bosque II) and Parque do Ingá, these being open to the public. It also includes smaller preserved areas as the Parque do Cinquentenário, private areas and so on.

Throughout the year, it is possible to observe its tree-lined streets that produce excellent air quality year-round, and the trees tend to bloom vibrantly during the transition from winter to spring.

=== Pollution ===
Even with the normal problems of urban centers, Maringá preserves its reputation as a green city, ecologically well cared for. Its origin had planning, urban planning, forest reserves, landscaped medians, wide avenues, several species of trees that follow a Master Plan.

Proportionally, Maringá has one of the largest fleets per capita of vehicles of Paraná State. Consequently, certain areas face pollution levels above the acceptable limits. Two regions that are heavily affected by this concentrated pollution are the avenue Duque de Caxias and Colombo. Industries, pesticides, noise pollution and household waste also contribute significantly to the issue.

== Economy ==
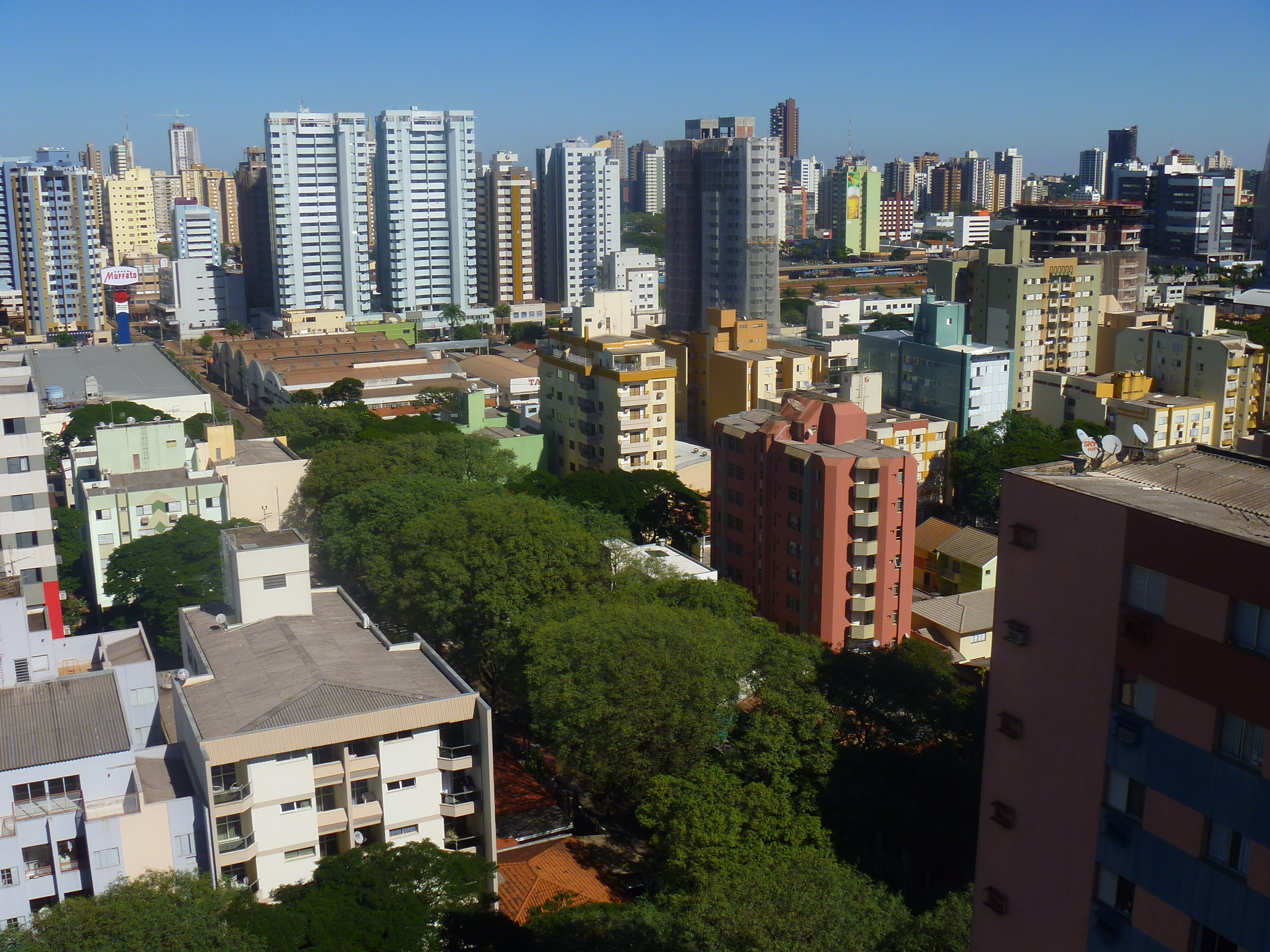
Downtown Maringá

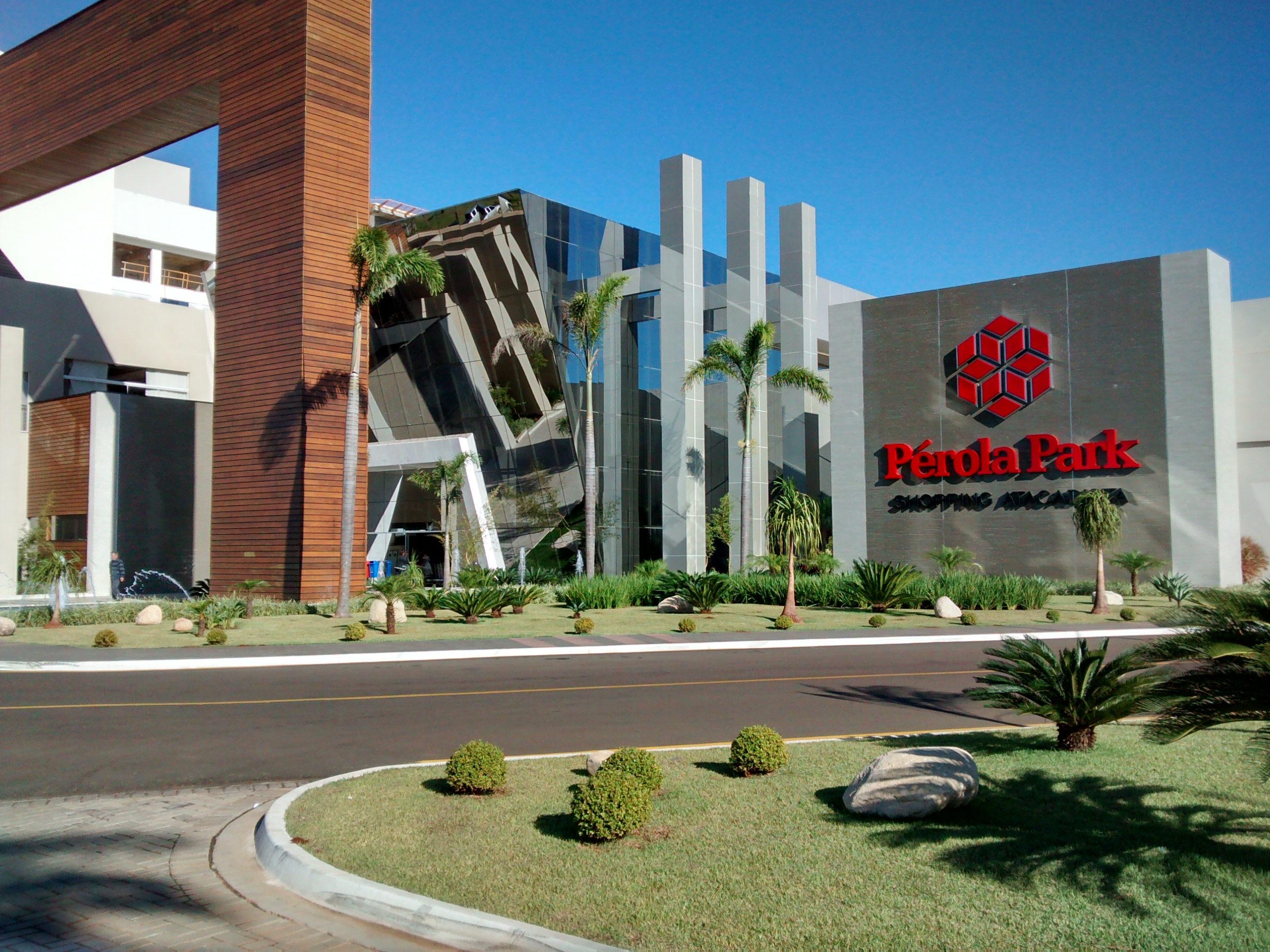
Perola Park mall.

Maringá is notable for its commercial sector and service delivery. The service sector is Maringá's largest (76,74%), followed by industrial (22,29%) and farming (0,97%). Within industry, the food-processing, chemical and textile sectors predominate.

=== Agriculture ===
Agriculture is fundamental to Maringá, although its importance has declined in recent years. Farming is diversified; besides coffee, the region currently produces corn, wheat, cotton, ramie, beans, peanuts, rice, sugarcane, and especially soybeans.

=== Industry ===
Among the various segments in the industrial sector of Maringá, there are metal-mechanics, agribusiness, textile and food companies. The industrial sector is not as significant as agriculture, but it's growing. The city has a growing fleet that handles weaving and agribusiness, but mostly clothing. Big industries such as Cocamar, Coca-Cola, Noma, among others, foster job creation in the region, and even other cities. Metalworking industries serve the entire country and also export to countries in Latin America a very large range of products. Maringá is the fashion hub in the south of Brazil, with the largest wholesale mall in Latin America, the Mercosul. Recently, Maringá also has been highlighted in the software market, with a consolidated APL (Local Productive Arrangements).

=== Service sector ===
Maringá has five shopping malls: Avenida Center Mall, Cidade Mall, Mandacaru Boulevard Mall, Maringá Park Mall (formerly Aspen Park Mall) and Catuaí Maringá Mall, this is the second largest shopping mall in the State of Paraná (behind only Londrina Catuaí Mall). The commercial vocation of Maringá can be proven by dynamism and variety of items offered by companies from the sectors of food products, pharmaceuticals, clothing, appliances, fittings, bookstores, restaurants, snack bars. And for being a wholesaler hub, commodity prices are also competitive. These factors combine to attract consumers from different regions of Paraná, southwest of São Paulo and some cities in Mato Grosso and Mato Grosso do Sul. The companies act in at least seven segments of the wholesale market: food, dry goods and offal, paper, glass, textiles, wood, auto parts and appliances. Not to mention the many garment industries, which basically sell them at wholesale. The city houses the Maringa and Region Convention & Visitors Bureau, an organization of character and independent nonprofit whose goal is to develop the regional economy by encouraging tourism events. Established and maintained by public and private initiatives related to tourism and events industry, it is responsible for planned development of the same, including the city effectively in the national and international tourist circuits.

Sílvio Name Júnior Regional Airport has scheduled air connections to major centers in Brazil.

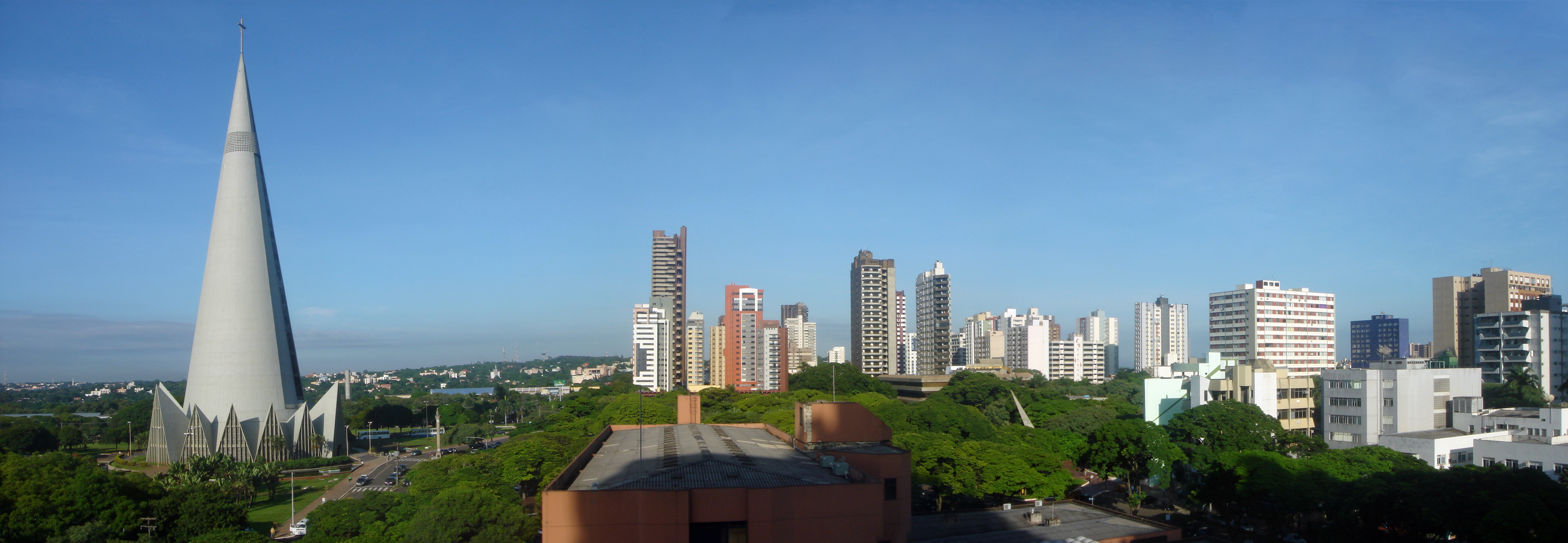
Maringa skyline
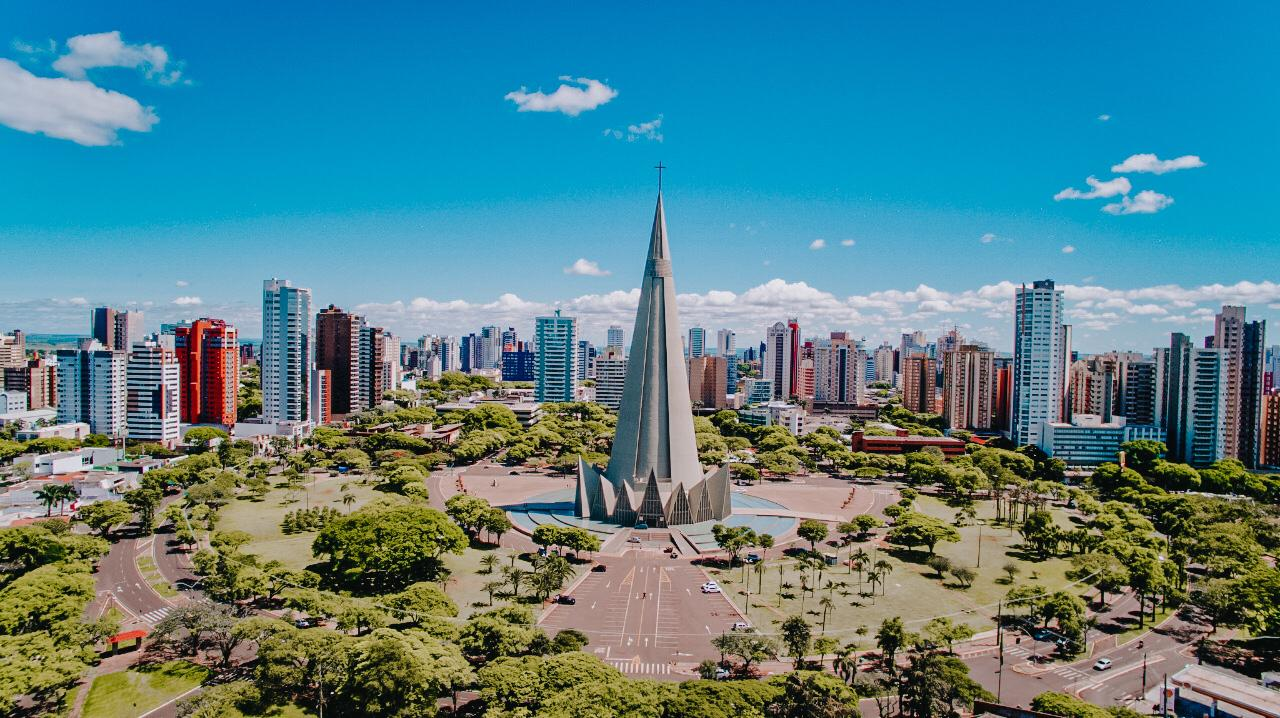
Maringa skyline

== Sports ==
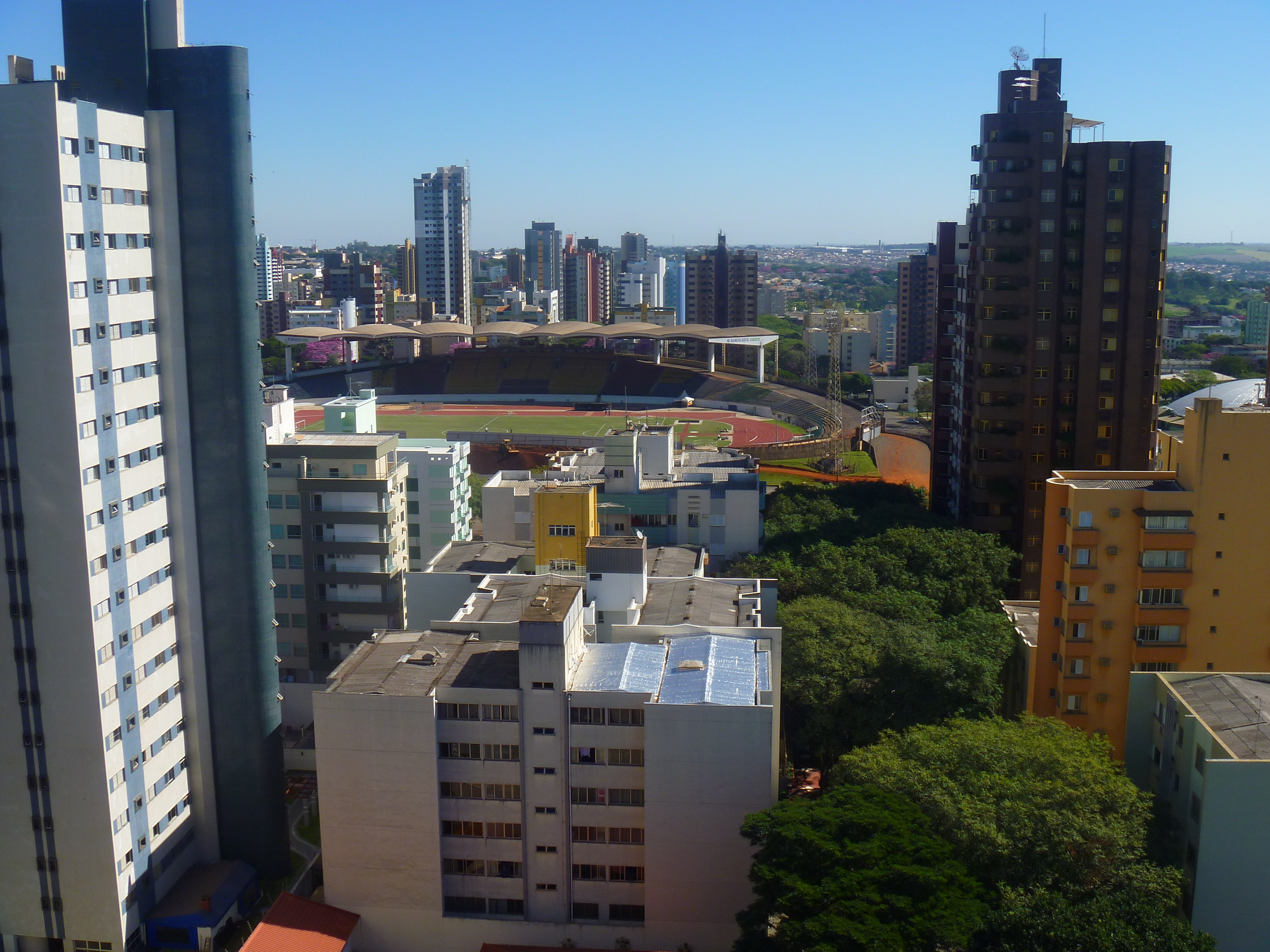
Maringá's football stadium, Willie Davids

Maringá currently has two professional football clubs, Grêmio Maringá and Maringá FC, the former plays in the 2nd division of the Paranaense Championship and the latter plays in the 1st division of the Paranaense Championship. Both play their games at Stadium Willie Davids, with a capacity up to 15,300 fans. The most traditional club is Grêmio Maringá, which has won three State Championships, and a runner-up in four. Meanwhile, Maringá FC has won state lower division and cup titles. The city used to have a third team, currently dormant, Adap Galo Maringá. All of the aforementioned teams play at the city's stadium Estádio Willie Davids.

== Universities ==
Among several private universities, the ones that usually stand out in terms of number of undergraduates and graduates are:

UEM - Universidade Estadual de Maringá (Paraná State-sponsored Public university)

- UEM, the only public university of Maringa (in Portuguese)

CESUMAR - Centro de Estudos Superiores de Maringá called Centro Universitario de Maringá

- Cesumar one of the private universities in Maringá (in Portuguese)

PUC - Pontificia Universidade Catolica do Paraná - Campus Maringá

== Media ==
Maringá is well served by internet, radio, print newspapers, television, telephone and mobile phone companies. Maringá has 15 TV stations and substations and 14 Radio FM stations.

== Twin towns – sister cities ==
Maringá is twinned with:

- Caserta, Italy (2000)
- General San Martín, Argentina (1993)
- Kakogawa, Japan (1972)
- Leiria, Portugal (1982)

== Notable people ==
Notable people from Maringá include:

- Celso Portiolli, television presenter
- Everaldo Matsuura, chess Grandmaster
- Felipe Drugovich, racing driver
- Leonardo Drugovich, former professional footballer
- Pedro Orochi, streamer and YouTuber
- Sergio Moro, former judge and politician
- Sônia Braga, actress

== Demographics ==
Maringá had 429,660 inhabitants in the 2025 census. The city is recognized by the United Nations Food and Agriculture Organization (FAO-UN) as a "Tree City of the World" and is celebrated for its commitment to sustainable urban development and environmental conservation.

== Economy ==
Maringá's economy is diverse and dynamic, featuring sectors such as:

- Agriculture and livestock farming, primarily grain production (corn, soybeans)
- Commerce and services
- Small manufacturing and processing facilities
- Education and research (with several higher education institutions)
- Tourism and hospitality

The city is a center for economic activity in the Paraná region and contributes significantly to regional development.

== Tourism ==
Maringá is known as the "Song City" (Cidade Canção) and offers several attractions for visitors:

- The Cathedral Basilica of Nossa Senhora da Glória – one of the tallest church buildings in South America (124 meters high)
- Ingá Park – a large urban park with diverse flora
- Grevíllea Woods Park – a scenic park
- The International Literary Festival of Maringá (FLIM) – an important international literary festival
- Igarapé Park – another popular green space
- Buddhist Temple Jodoshu Nippakuji

== See also ==
- Catedral de Maringá
