= Goioerê =

Coordinates: 24.185°S 53.0278°W

- Municipality
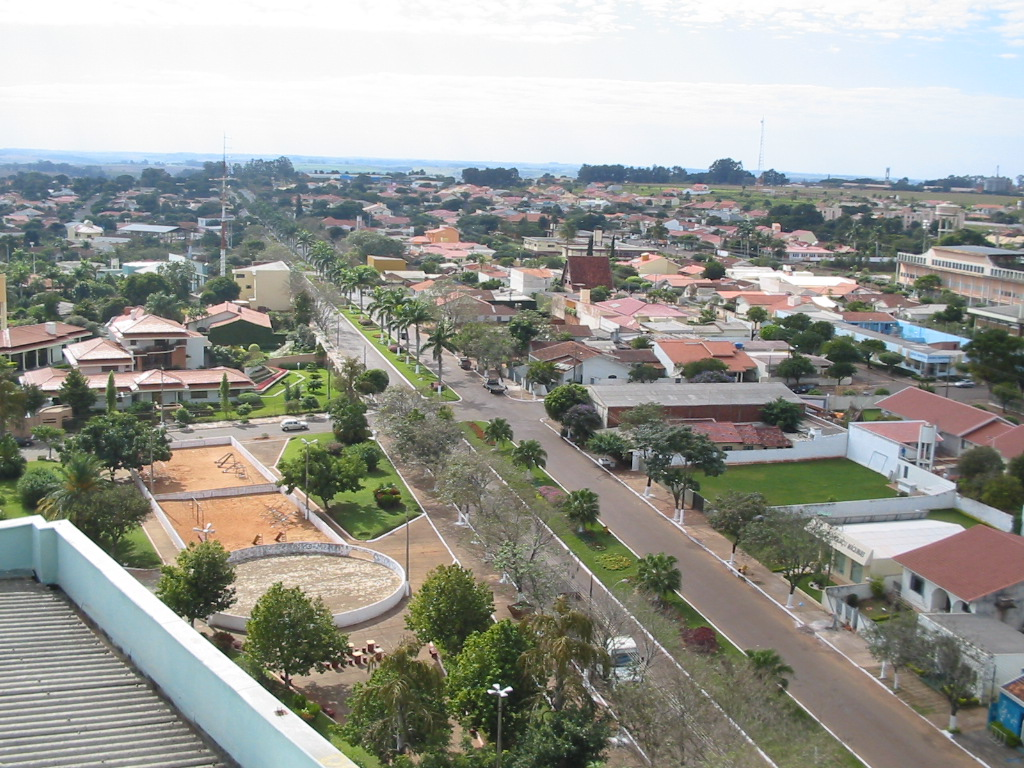

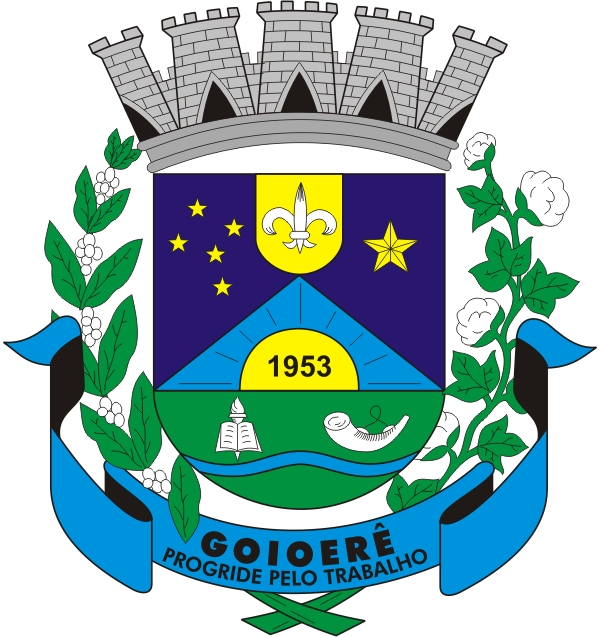
- Flag Coat of arms

- Country: Brazil
- Region: Southern
- State: Paraná
- Mesoregion: Centro Ocidental Paranaense

Population (2020)
  - Total: 28,808
- Time zone: UTC−3 (BRT)

Goioerê is a municipality in the state of Paraná in the Southern Region of Brazil.

== See also ==
- List of municipalities in Paraná
