= Rodrigo Bastos =

Brazilian sport shooter

Personal information
- Full name: Rodrigo Pimentel Bastos
- Nationality: Brazil
- Born: 4 July 1967 (age 59) Guarapuava, Brazil
- Height: 1.81 m (5 ft 11 1/2 in)
- Weight: 100 kg (220 lb)

Sport
- Sport: Shooting
- Event: Trap (TR125)
- Coached by: Carlo Danna
Medal record
Men's shooting
Representing Brazil
Pan American Games
Silver medal – second place	2003 Santo Domingo	TR125

Rodrigo Pimentel Bastos (born July 4, 1967 in Guarapuava) is a Brazilian sport shooter. He represented his nation Brazil in two editions of the Olympic Games (1988 and 2004), and also picked up a silver medal in men's trap at the 2003 Pan American Games in Santo Domingo, Dominican Republic.

Bastos made his official debut at the 1988 Summer Olympics in Seoul, where he shared a fortieth spot with Chinese shooter Gao E in the mixed trap, accumulating a total score of 137 clay pigeons. On that same year, Bastos scored 24 hits to pocket the gold medal at the ISSF World Cup series in Mexico City, Mexico.

Sixteen years after his first Olympics, Bastos qualified for his second Brazilian squad, as a 37-year-old, in the men's trap at the 2004 Summer Olympics in Athens. Earlier in the process, he placed second behind U.S. sport shooter Lance Bade by a single point difference from the Pan American Games in Santo Domingo, Dominican Republic, ending a 15-year medal drought of his sporting career. He scored 117 out of 125 targets to obtain a fourteenth spot in the prelims, tying his record with four other shooters.

At the 2014 ISSF World Shooting Championships in Granada, Spain, Bastos delivered an astonishing record in the nation's sporting history with a fifth-place finish in the men's trap. With his nation hosting the 2016 Summer Olympics in Rio de Janeiro, Bastos is expected to compete on his third Olympic bid.
