= Cidade Gaúcha =

Coordinates: 23°22′S 53°01′W

- Municipality
- Flag Coat of arms
- Interactive map of Cidade Gaúcha
- Country: Brazil
- Region: Southern
- State: Paraná
- Mesoregion: Noroeste Paranaense

Population (2020)
  - Total: 12,797
- Time zone: UTC−3 (BRT)

Cidade Gaúcha is a municipality in the state of Paraná in the Southern Region of Brazil.

== See also ==
- List of municipalities in Paraná
