= 2021 Campeonato Brasileiro Série C =

Campeonato Brasileiro Série C
- Season: 2021
- Dates: 29 May – 20 November 2021
- Champions: Ituano (2nd title)
- Promoted: Criciúma; Ituano; Novorizontino; Tombense
- Relegated: Jacuipense; Oeste; Paraná; Santa Cruz
- Matches: 206
- Goals: 423 (2.05 per match)
- Top goalscorer: Quirino (10 goals)
- Biggest home win: Volta Redonda 5–0 Manaus; Group A, R2, 6 June; Manaus 5–0 Novorizontino; Group D, R1, 3 October
- Biggest away win: Ituano 1–4 Novorizontino; Group B, R2, 5 June; Mirassol 0–3 Paraná; Group B, R7, 10 July; Mirassol 2–5 São José; Group B, R15, 3 September; Botafogo-SP 1–4 Novorizontino; Group B, R15, 4 September; Paysandu 1–4 Ituano; Group C, R4, 23 October
- Highest scoring: 7 goals Mirassol 2–5 São José; Group B, R15, 3 September
- Longest winning run: 5 games Ituano; Novorizontino
- Longest unbeaten run: 10 games Ituano
- Longest winless run: 10 games Jacuipense; Oeste; Santa Cruz
- Longest losing run: 5 games Santa Cruz
- Highest attendance: 12,897; Manaus 1–1 Ypiranga; Group D, R3, 17 October
- Lowest attendance: 64; Ypiranga 3–2 Novorizontino; Group D, R5, 30 October
- Total attendance: 68,971
- Average attendance: 2,874

The 2021 Campeonato Brasileiro Série C was a football competition held in Brazil, equivalent to the third division. It began on 29 May and ended on 20 November 2021.

Twenty teams competed in the tournament, twelve returning from the 2020 season, four promoted from the 2020 Campeonato Brasileiro Série D (Altos, Floresta, Mirassol and Novorizontino) and four relegated from the 2020 Campeonato Brasileiro Série B (Botafogo-SP, Figueirense, Oeste and Paraná).

Criciúma, Ituano, Novorizontino and Tombense were promoted to the 2022 Campeonato Brasileiro Série B.

Ituano defeated Tombense 4–1 on aggregate in the finals to win their second title.

== Format ==
In the first stage, the teams were divided into two groups of ten teams each. Each group was played on a home-and-away round-robin basis. The top four teams of each group advanced to the second stage.

In the second stage, the teams were divided into two groups of four teams each. Each group was played on a home-and-away round-robin basis. The top two teams of each group were promoted to the Série B, while the group winners qualified for the finals.

== Teams ==
Location of teams in 2021 Série C

| Pos. | Relegated from 2020 Série B |
|---|---|
| 17th | Figueirense |
| 18th | Paraná |
| 19th | Botafogo-SP |
| 20th | Oeste |

| Pos. | Promoted from 2020 Série D |
|---|---|
| 1st | Mirassol |
| 2nd | Floresta |
| 3rd | Novorizontino |
| 4th | Altos |

=== Number of teams by state ===
| Number of teams | State | Team(s) |
|---|---|---|
| 5 | São Paulo | Botafogo-SP, Ituano, Mirassol, Novorizontino and Oeste |
| 2 | Ceará | Ferroviário and Floresta |
| 2 | Rio Grande do Sul | São José and Ypiranga |
| 2 | Santa Catarina | Criciúma and Figueirense |
| 1 | Amazonas | Manaus |
| 1 | Bahia | Jacuipense |
| 1 | Minas Gerais | Tombense |
| 1 | Pará | Paysandu |
| 1 | Paraíba | Botafogo-PB |
| 1 | Paraná | Paraná |
| 1 | Pernambuco | Santa Cruz |
| 1 | Piauí | Altos |
| 1 | Rio de Janeiro | Volta Redonda |

== Personnel and kits ==
| Team | Home city | Manager | Kit Manufacturer |
|---|---|---|---|
| Altos | Altos | (Brazil) Paulinho Kobayashi | (Brazil) Pratic Sport |
| Botafogo-PB | João Pessoa | (Brazil) Gerson Gusmão | (Brazil) Belo 1931 (Club manufactured kit) |
| Botafogo-SP | Ribeirão Preto | (Brazil) Samuel Dias (caretaker) | (Brazil) Volt Sport |
| Criciúma | Criciúma | (Brazil) Cláudio Tencati | (Brazil) Garra91 (Club manufactured kit) |
| Ferroviário | Fortaleza | (Brazil) Anderson Batatais | (Brazil) BM9 Sports |
| Figueirense | Florianópolis | (Brazil) Jorginho Cantinflas | (Brazil) 1921 (Club manufactured kit) |
| Floresta | Fortaleza | (Brazil) Leston Júnior | (Brazil) Seromo Sports |
| Ituano | Itu | (Brazil) Mazola Júnior | (Brazil) Alluri |
| Jacuipense | Riachão do Jacuípe | (Brazil) Jonilson Veloso | (Brazil) Niory Sport |
| Manaus | Manaus | (Brazil) Evaristo Piza | (Brazil) Ícone Sports |
| Mirassol | Mirassol | (Brazil) Eduardo Baptista | (Brazil) Super Bolla |
| Novorizontino | Novo Horizonte | (Brazil) Léo Condé | (Brazil) Physicus |
| Oeste | Barueri | (Brazil) Sérgio Alexsandro (caretaker) | (Brazil) Deka Sports |
| Paraná | Curitiba | (Brazil) Jorge Ferreira | (Brazil) Valente (Club manufactured kit) |
| Paysandu | Belém | (Brazil) Wilton Bezerra | (Brazil) Lobo (Club manufactured kit) |
| Santa Cruz | Recife | (Brazil) Roberto Fernandes | (Brazil) Cobra Coral (Club manufactured kit) |
| São José | Porto Alegre | (Brazil) Pingo | (Brazil) Weefe |
| Tombense | Tombos | (Brazil) Rafael Guanaes | (Brazil) Vettor |
| Volta Redonda | Volta Redonda | (Brazil) Neto Colucci | (Brazil) Ícone Sports |
| Ypiranga | Erechim | (Brazil) Júnior Rocha | (Brazil) Clanel |

=== Managerial changes ===
| Team | Outgoing manager | Manner of departure | Date of vacancy | Position in table | Incoming manager | Date of appointment | Ref |
|---|---|---|---|---|---|---|---|
| Criciúma | (Brazil) Itamar Schülle | End of contract | 31 December 2020 | Pre-season | (Brazil) Hemerson Maria | 8 January 2021 | |
| Botafogo-PB | (Brazil) Evaristo Piza | End of contract | 3 January 2021 | Pre-season | (Brazil) Marcelo Vilar | 4 January 2021 | |
| São José | (Brazil) China Balbino | End of contract | 3 January 2021 | Pre-season | (Brazil) Carlos Moraes | 4 January 2021 | |
| Tombense | (Brazil) Julinho Camargo | Resigned | 6 January 2021 | Pre-season | (Brazil) Bruno Pivetti | 7 January 2021 | |
| Paysandu | (Brazil) João Brigatti | Sacked | 17 January 2021 | Pre-season | (Brazil) Itamar Schülle | 30 January 2021 | |
| Ypiranga | (Brazil) Celso Teixeira | Mutual agreement | 18 January 2021 | Pre-season | (Brazil) Júnior Rocha | 25 January 2021 | |
| Novorizontino | (Brazil) Roberto Fonseca | Sacked | 26 January 2021 | Pre-season | (Brazil) Léo Condé | 30 January 2021 | |
| Botafogo-SP | (Brazil) Samuel Dias | End of caretaker tenure | 29 January 2021 | Pre-season | (Brazil) Alexandre Gallo | 29 January 2021 | |
| Ferroviário | (Brazil) Totonho | End of caretaker tenure | 29 January 2021 | Pre-season | (Brazil) Francisco Diá | 29 January 2021 | |
| Manaus | (Brazil) Souza Baiano | End of caretaker tenure | 29 January 2021 | Pre-season | (Brazil) Luizinho Vieira | 29 January 2021 | |
| Paraná | (Brazil) Márcio Coelho | Sacked | 4 February 2021 | Pre-season | (Brazil) Maurílio Silva | 4 February 2021 | |
| Santa Cruz | (Brazil) Marcelo Martelotte | End of contract | 14 February 2021 | Pre-season | (Brazil) João Brigatti | 17 February 2021 | |
| Manaus | (Brazil) Luizinho Vieira | Sacked | 9 March 2021 | Pre-season | (Brazil) Luizinho Lopes | 11 March 2021 | |
| São José | (Brazil) Carlos Moraes | Sacked | 20 March 2021 | Pre-season | (Brazil) Hélio Vieira | 26 March 2021 | |
| Botafogo-SP | (Brazil) Alexandre Gallo | Sacked | 1 April 2021 | Pre-season | (Brazil) Argel Fuchs | 2 April 2021 | |
| Criciúma | (Brazil) Hemerson Maria | Sacked | 1 April 2021 | Pre-season | (Brazil) Paulo Baier | 4 May 2021 | |
| Botafogo-PB | (Brazil) Marcelo Vilar | Sacked | 2 April 2021 | Pre-season | (Brazil) Gerson Gusmão | 3 April 2021 | |
| Santa Cruz | (Brazil) João Brigatti | Sacked | 11 April 2021 | Pre-season | (Brazil) Alexandre Gallo | 13 April 2021 | |
| Altos | (Brazil) Fernando Tonet | Resigned | 20 April 2021 | Pre-season | (Brazil) Marcelo Vilar | 21 April 2021 | |
| Tombense | (Brazil) Bruno Pivetti | Signed by CSA | 26 April 2021 | Pre-season | (Brazil) Rafael Guanaes | 26 April 2021 | |
| Santa Cruz | (Brazil) Alexandre Gallo | Resigned | 26 April 2021 | Pre-season | (Brazil) Bolívar | 27 April 2021 | |
| Paysandu | (Brazil) Itamar Schülle | Sacked | 16 May 2021 | Pre-season | (Brazil) Vinícius Eutrópio | 19 May 2021 | |
| Manaus | (Brazil) Luizinho Lopes | Resigned | 24 May 2021 | Pre-season | (Brazil) Marcelo Martelotte | 25 May 2021 | |
| Ituano | (Brazil) Vinícius Bergantin | Resigned | 6 June 2021 | 10th (Group B) | (Brazil) Mazola Júnior | 6 June 2021 | |
| Santa Cruz | (Brazil) Bolívar | Sacked | 16 June 2021 | 9th (Group A) | (Brazil) Roberto Fernandes | 16 June 2021 | |
| Oeste | (Brazil) Roberto Cavalo | Mutual agreement | 10 July 2021 | 10th (Group B) | (Brazil) João Brigatti (Note: Sérgio Alexsandro was the caretaker manager on the 7th, 8th and 9th rounds, against Ituano, São José and Paraná, respectively) | 26 July 2021 | |
| São José | (Brazil) Hélio Vieira | Sacked | 12 July 2021 | 9th (Group B) | (Brazil) Pingo (Note: Gabriel Carvalho was the caretaker manager on the 8th round against Oeste) | 17 July 2021 | |
| Paraná | (Brazil) Maurílio Silva | Sacked | 20 July 2021 | 9th (Group B) | (Brazil) Sílvio Criciúma (Note: Jorge Ferreira was the caretaker manager on the 9th round against Oeste) | 23 July 2021 | |
| Paysandu | (Brazil) Vinícius Eutrópio | Sacked | 26 July 2021 | 5th (Group A) | (Brazil) Roberto Fonseca | 26 July 2021 | |
| Manaus | (Brazil) Marcelo Martelotte | Sacked | 26 July 2021 | 7th (Group A) | (Brazil) Evaristo Piza | 27 July 2021 | |
| Jacuipense | (Brazil) Jonilson Veloso | Removed from the role | 1 August 2021 | 9th (Group A) | (Brazil) Luizinho Lopes | 2 August 2021 | |
| Altos | (Brazil) Marcelo Vilar | Sacked | 2 August 2021 | 7th (Group A) | (Brazil) Paulinho Kobayashi | 2 August 2021 | |
| Jacuipense | (Brazil) Luizinho Lopes | Resigned | 23 August 2021 | 9th (Group A) | (Brazil) Jonilson Veloso (Note: Quintino Barbosa was the caretaker manager on the 13th round against Santa Cruz) | 25 August 2021 | |
| Oeste | (Brazil) João Brigatti | Resigned | 10 July 2021 | 10th (Group B) | (Note: Sérgio Alexsandro was the caretaker manager from the 14th until the 18th round, against Botafogo-SP, Ypiranga, Ituano, São José and Paraná) | | |
| Paraná | (Brazil) Sílvio Criciúma | Sacked | 31 August 2021 | 9th (Group B) | (Brazil) Jorge Ferreira | 31 August 2021 | |
| Ferroviário | (Brazil) Francisco Diá | Resigned | 5 September 2021 | 6th (Group A) | (Brazil) Anderson Batatais | 6 September 2021 | |
| Botafogo-SP | (Brazil) Argel Fuchs | Sacked | 18 September 2021 | 7th (Group B) | (Note: Samuel Dias was the caretaker manager on the 18th round against Ituano) | | |
| Criciúma | (Brazil) Paulo Baier | Sacked | 4 October 2021 | 2nd (Group C) | (Brazil) Cláudio Tencati | 5 October 2021 | |
| Paysandu | (Brazil) Roberto Fonseca | Sacked | 18 October 2021 | 4th (Group C) | (Brazil) Wilton Bezerra | 18 October 2021 | |

== First stage ==
In the first stage, each group was played on a home-and-away round-robin basis. The teams were ranked according to points (3 points for a win, 1 point for a draw, and 0 points for a loss). If tied on points, the following criteria would be used to determine the ranking: 1. Wins; 2. Goal difference; 3. Goals scored; 4. Head-to-head (if the tie is only between two teams); 5. Fewest red cards; 6. Fewest yellow cards; 7. Draw in the headquarters of the Brazilian Football Confederation (Regulations Article 15).

The top four teams of each group advanced to the second stage.

=== Group A ===
| Pos | Team | Pld | W | D | L | GF | GA | GD | Pts | Qualification or relegation |
|---|---|---|---|---|---|---|---|---|---|---|
| 1 | Paysandu | 18 | 8 | 6 | 4 | 23 | 20 | +3 | 30 | Advance to second stage |
| 2 | Tombense | 18 | 6 | 9 | 3 | 22 | 14 | +8 | 27 | Advance to second stage |
| 3 | Botafogo-PB | 18 | 6 | 9 | 3 | 17 | 11 | +6 | 27 | Advance to second stage |
| 4 | Manaus | 18 | 7 | 5 | 6 | 21 | 25 | −4 | 26 | Advance to second stage |
| 5 | Volta Redonda | 18 | 6 | 8 | 4 | 21 | 16 | +5 | 26 | |
| 6 | Ferroviário | 18 | 5 | 9 | 4 | 14 | 12 | +2 | 24 | |
| 7 | Altos | 18 | 5 | 6 | 7 | 21 | 23 | −2 | 21 | |
| 8 | Floresta | 18 | 4 | 9 | 5 | 15 | 17 | −2 | 21 | |
| 9 | Jacuipense (R) | 18 | 3 | 9 | 6 | 13 | 21 | −8 | 18 | Relegation to 2022 Campeonato Brasileiro Série D |
| 10 | Santa Cruz (R) | 18 | 2 | 6 | 10 | 11 | 19 | −8 | 12 | Relegation to 2022 Campeonato Brasileiro Série D |

Source: CBF
Rules for classification: 1) points; 2) wins; 3) goal difference; 4) goals scored; 5) head-to-head results (only between 2 teams); 6) fewest red cards; 7) fewest yellow cards; 8) draw.
(R) Relegated

==== Results ====
| Home \ Away | ALT | BOT | FER | FLO | JAC | MAN | PAY | SAN | TOM | VOL |
|---|---|---|---|---|---|---|---|---|---|---|
| Altos | — | 0–0 | 1–1 | 0–1 | 2–2 | 3–2 | 2–3 | 1–0 | 0–0 | 3–0 |
| Botafogo-PB | 2–0 | — | 0–0 | 1–2 | 1–0 | 4–1 | 1–0 | 1–0 | 1–1 | 1–2 |
| Ferroviário | 1–0 | 0–0 | — | 0–1 | 0–0 | 1–0 | 5–1 | 1–0 | 0–0 | 1–1 |
| Floresta | 1–2 | 0–0 | 1–1 | — | 2–0 | 2–2 | 0–2 | 0–2 | 1–1 | 1–1 |
| Jacuipense | 3–2 | 0–0 | 1–0 | 1–1 | — | 0–1 | 0–2 | 1–1 | 1–1 | 1–0 |
| Manaus | 2–0 | 0–0 | 1–1 | 2–1 | 1–1 | — | 1–1 | 2–0 | 2–1 | 1–0 |
| Paysandu | 1–1 | 0–2 | 0–2 | 1–1 | 2–0 | 2–0 | — | 1–0 | 1–0 | 0–0 |
| Santa Cruz | 0–1 | 1–1 | 0–0 | 0–0 | 2–2 | 1–2 | 1–2 | — | 0–1 | 2–1 |
| Tombense | 2–2 | 2–0 | 3–0 | 0–0 | 3–0 | 2–1 | 1–1 | 2–1 | — | 1–1 |
| Volta Redonda | 2–1 | 1–1 | 2–0 | 1–0 | 0–0 | 5–0 | 2–2 | 0–0 | 2–1 | — |

Source: CBF
Legend: Blue = home team win; Yellow = draw; Red = away team win.

=== Group B ===
| Pos | Team | Pld | W | D | L | GF | GA | GD | Pts | Qualification or relegation |
|---|---|---|---|---|---|---|---|---|---|---|
| 1 | Novorizontino | 18 | 12 | 3 | 3 | 24 | 10 | +14 | 39 | Advance to second stage |
| 2 | Ituano | 18 | 9 | 6 | 3 | 22 | 16 | +6 | 33 | Advance to second stage |
| 3 | Ypiranga | 18 | 9 | 5 | 4 | 26 | 16 | +10 | 32 | Advance to second stage |
| 4 | Criciúma | 18 | 9 | 3 | 6 | 19 | 16 | +3 | 30 | Advance to second stage |
| 5 | Figueirense | 18 | 8 | 5 | 5 | 19 | 14 | +5 | 29 | |
| 6 | São José | 18 | 6 | 5 | 7 | 22 | 22 | 0 | 23 | |
| 7 | Botafogo-SP | 18 | 6 | 4 | 8 | 15 | 22 | −7 | 22 | |
| 8 | Mirassol | 18 | 6 | 1 | 11 | 17 | 26 | −9 | 19 | |
| 9 | Paraná (R) | 18 | 4 | 4 | 10 | 17 | 21 | −4 | 16 | Relegation to 2022 Campeonato Brasileiro Série D |
| 10 | Oeste (R) | 18 | 1 | 4 | 13 | 9 | 27 | −18 | 7 | Relegation to 2022 Campeonato Brasileiro Série D |

Source: CBF
Rules for classification: 1) points; 2) wins; 3) goal difference; 4) goals scored; 5) head-to-head results (only between 2 teams); 6) fewest red cards; 7) fewest yellow cards; 8) draw.
(R) Relegated

==== Results ====
| Home \ Away | BOT | CRI | FIG | ITU | MIR | NOV | OES | PAR | SJO | YPI |
|---|---|---|---|---|---|---|---|---|---|---|
| Botafogo-SP | — | 3–1 | 1–2 | 2–1 | 1–3 | 1–4 | 1–0 | 1–0 | 1–0 | 1–2 |
| Criciúma | 0–0 | — | 1–0 | 1–0 | 3–0 | 1–0 | 3–1 | 2–0 | 2–1 | 2–1 |
| Figueirense | 0–0 | 2–1 | — | 1–2 | 1–1 | 2–1 | 1–0 | 2–0 | 2–0 | 1–1 |
| Ituano | 0–0 | 3–0 | 1–0 | — | 2–1 | 1–4 | 2–1 | 2–1 | 2–2 | 2–1 |
| Mirassol | 1–0 | 2–0 | 0–1 | 1–2 | — | 0–1 | 2–1 | 0–3 | 2–5 | 1–2 |
| Novorizontino | 1–0 | 1–0 | 1–0 | 0–0 | 1–0 | — | 0–0 | 1–0 | 1–0 | 1–0 |
| Oeste | 0–0 | 0–0 | 2–1 | 0–1 | 0–1 | 1–2 | — | 1–1 | 0–1 | 2–4 |
| Paraná | 0–1 | 2–1 | 1–1 | 1–1 | 0–1 | 0–2 | 4–0 | — | 3–1 | 1–1 |
| São José | 4–2 | 0–0 | 1–2 | 0–0 | 2–1 | 1–1 | 1–0 | 1–0 | — | 1–1 |
| Ypiranga | 3–0 | 0–1 | 0–0 | 0–0 | 1–0 | 3–2 | 2–0 | 2–0 | 2–1 | — |

Source: CBF
Legend: Blue = home team win; Yellow = draw; Red = away team win.

== Second stage ==
In the second stage, each group was played on a home-and-away round-robin basis. The teams were ranked according to points (3 points for a win, 1 point for a draw, and 0 points for a loss). If tied on points, the criteria to determine the ranking would be the same as used in the first stage (Regulations Article 19).

The top two teams of each group were promoted to the Série B. Group winners advanced to the finals.

=== Group C ===
| Pos | Team | Pld | W | D | L | GF | GA | GD | Pts | Qualification |
|---|---|---|---|---|---|---|---|---|---|---|
| 1 | Ituano (P) | 6 | 4 | 1 | 1 | 11 | 5 | +6 | 13 | Advance to Finals and promoted to 2022 Campeonato Brasileiro Série B |
| 2 | Criciúma (P) | 6 | 2 | 3 | 1 | 3 | 1 | +2 | 9 | Promoted to 2022 Campeonato Brasileiro Série B |
| 3 | Botafogo-PB | 6 | 2 | 2 | 2 | 3 | 4 | −1 | 8 | |
| 4 | Paysandu | 6 | 0 | 2 | 4 | 2 | 9 | −7 | 2 | |

Source: CBF
Rules for classification: 1) points; 2) wins; 3) goal difference; 4) goals scored; 5) head-to-head results (only between 2 teams); 6) fewest red cards; 7) fewest yellow cards; 8) draw.
(P) Promoted

==== Results ====
| Home \ Away | BOT | CRI | ITU | PAY |
|---|---|---|---|---|
| Botafogo-PB | — | 1–0 | 0–1 | 1–0 |
| Criciúma | 0–0 | — | 0–0 | 0–0 |
| Ituano | 3–1 | 0–2 | — | 3–1 |
| Paysandu | 0–0 | 0–1 | 1–4 | — |

Source: CBF
Legend: Blue = home team win; Yellow = draw; Red = away team win.

=== Group D ===
| Pos | Team | Pld | W | D | L | GF | GA | GD | Pts | Qualification |
|---|---|---|---|---|---|---|---|---|---|---|
| 1 | Tombense (P) | 6 | 3 | 2 | 1 | 8 | 6 | +2 | 11 | Advance to Finals and promoted to 2022 Campeonato Brasileiro Série B |
| 2 | Novorizontino (P) | 6 | 3 | 0 | 3 | 7 | 10 | −3 | 9 | Promoted to 2022 Campeonato Brasileiro Série B |
| 3 | Manaus | 6 | 1 | 3 | 2 | 10 | 8 | +2 | 6 | |
| 4 | Ypiranga | 6 | 1 | 3 | 2 | 6 | 7 | −1 | 6 | |

Source: CBF
Rules for classification: 1) points; 2) wins; 3) goal difference; 4) goals scored; 5) head-to-head results (only between 2 teams); 6) fewest red cards; 7) fewest yellow cards; 8) draw.
(P) Promoted

==== Results ====
| Home \ Away | MAN | NOV | TOM | YPI |
|---|---|---|---|---|
| Manaus | — | 5–0 | 1–2 | 1–1 |
| Novorizontino | 2–0 | — | 0–1 | 1–0 |
| Tombense | 2–2 | 1–2 | — | 1–1 |
| Ypiranga | 1–1 | 3–2 | 0–1 | — |

Source: CBF
Legend: Blue = home team win; Yellow = draw; Red = away team win.

== Finals ==
The finals were played on a home-and-away two-legged basis, with the higher-seeded team hosting the second leg. If tied on aggregate, the away goals rule would not be used, extra time would not be played, and the penalty shoot-out would be used to determine the champions (Regulations Article 20).

The finalists were seeded according to their performance in the tournament. The teams were ranked according to overall points. If tied on overall points, the following criteria would be used to determine the ranking: 1. Overall wins; 2. Overall goal difference; 3. Overall goals scored; 4. Fewest red cards in the tournament; 5. Fewest yellow cards in the tournament; 6. Draw in the headquarters of the Brazilian Football Confederation (Regulations Article 21).

| Pos | Team | Pld | W | D | L | GF | GA | GD | Pts | Host |
|---|---|---|---|---|---|---|---|---|---|---|
| 1 | (São Paulo (state)) Ituano | 24 | 13 | 7 | 4 | 33 | 21 | +12 | 46 | 2nd leg |
| 2 | (Minas Gerais) Tombense | 24 | 9 | 11 | 4 | 30 | 20 | +10 | 38 | 1st leg |

Source: CBF

The matches were played on 13 and 20 November 2021.

| Team 1 | Agg. | Team 2 | 1st leg | 2nd leg |
|---|---|---|---|---|
| Tombense (Minas Gerais) | 1–4 | (São Paulo (state)) Ituano | 1–1 | 0–3 |

=== Matches ===
13 November 2021
17:15

| Tombense (Minas Gerais) | 1–1 | (São Paulo (state)) Ituano |
|---|---|---|
| Everton Galdino 51' | Report | Igor Henrique 83' |

Almeidão, Tombos
Attendance: 1,500
Referee: Antônio Dib Moraes de Sousa (Piauí)

20 November 2021
17:00

| Ituano (São Paulo (state)) | 3–0 | (Minas Gerais) Tombense |
|---|---|---|
| João Victor 21'; Igor Henrique 56'; Iago Teles 90+5' | Report |

Estádio Novelli Júnior, Itu
Attendance: 6,173
Referee: Anderson Daronco (Rio Grande do Sul)

== Top goalscorers ==
| Rank | Player | Club | Goals |
|---|---|---|---|
| 1 | (Brazil) Quirino | Ypiranga | 10 |
| 2 | (Brazil) Everton Galdino | Tombense | 8 |
| 2 | (Brazil) Manoel | Altos | 8 |
| 4 | (Brazil) Rubens | Tombense | 7 |
| 5 | (Brazil) Betinho | Altos | 6 |
| 5 | (Brazil) Cláudio Maradona | São José | 6 |
| 5 | (Brazil) João Victor | Ituano | 6 |
| 5 | (Brazil) Pipico | Santa Cruz | 6 |
| 5 | (Brazil) Tiago Marques | Ituano | 6 |
| 10 | (Brazil) Bruno Paraíba | Figueirense | 5 |
| 10 | (Brazil) Fernandinho | Ituano | 5 |
| 10 | (Brazil) Guilherme Queiróz | Novorizontino | 5 |
| 10 | (Brazil) Igor Henrique | Ituano | 5 |
| 10 | (Brazil) Jean Lucas | Tombense | 5 |
| 10 | (Brazil) Vanílson | Manaus | 5 |
| 10 | (Brazil) Welton Felipe | Botafogo-PB | 5 |

Source: CBF
