= 2008–09 Saudi Pro League =

Saudi Pro League
- Season: 2008–09
- Dates: 13 September 2008 – 12 April 2009
- Champions: Al-Ittihad (8th title)
- Relegated: Abha; Al-Watani
- AFC Champions League: Al-Ittihad; Al-Hilal; Al-Ahli; Al-Shabab
- Gulf Club Champions Cup: Al-Nassr; Al-Ettifaq
- Matches: 134
- Goals: 371 (2.77 per match)
- Top goalscorer: Hicham Aboucherouane; Nasser Al-Shamrani (12 goals each)
- Biggest home win: Al-Hilal 7–0 Najran (20 December 2008)
- Biggest away win: Al-Raed 0–4 Al-Shabab (30 November 2008); Al-Shabab 0–4 Al-Ittihad (28 January 2009)
- Highest scoring: Al-Ittihad 7–2 Al-Watani (15 December 2008); Al-Raed 6–3 Al-Wehda (8 April 2009)
- Longest winning run: Al-Ittihad (5 games)
- Longest unbeaten run: Al-Hilal (18 games)
- Longest winless run: Abha (12 games)
- Longest losing run: Al-Raed (5 games)

The 2008–09 Saudi Professional League was the 33rd season of Saudi Pro League since its establishment in 1976 and first after rebranding to the Saudi Pro League. Al-Hilal were the defending champions, having won their 11th title in the previous season. The campaign began on 13 September 2008 and ended on 12 April 2009. A total of 12 teams contested the league, 10 of which already contested in the 2007–08 season, and two of which were promoted from the First Division.

On 12 April 2009, in the final round of the season, Al-Ittihad won the title after a 2–1 victory over Al-Hilal. It was their eighth league title overall. Al-Ittihad, Al-Hilal, Al-Ahli and Al-Shabab all secured a berth for the 2010 AFC Champions League, while Al-Nassr and Al-Ettifaq qualified for the Gulf Club Champions Cup. Al-Watani and Abha were relegated to the Saudi First Division League.

== Changes ==
=== Professional League rebrand ===
On 26 May 2008, the SAFF announced that the league would be rebranded as Saudi Pro League. The changes were based on the criteria introduced by AFC President Mohammed bin Hammam to improve the football standards in Asia. The changes also included a website dedicated to recording statistics of the league for the first time. It was also announced that the website would be run by the Saudi Pro League board rather than the SAFF.

=== Qualification and Prize money ===
The league champions, runners-up and third place as well as the winner of the King Cup of Champions qualified for the 2010 AFC Champions League.

The top eight teams qualified for King Cup of Champions.

Prize money:

- First place: 2.5 million Saudi Riyals
- Second place: 1.5 million Saudi Riyals
- Third place: 1 million Saudi Riyals

== Teams ==
Twelve teams competed in the league – the top ten teams from the previous season and the two teams promoted from the Saudi First Division League. The promoted teams were Al-Raed (returning to the top flight after an absence of five years) and Abha (returning to the top flight after an absence of two years). They replaced Al-Tai (after seven consecutive years in the top-flight) and Al-Qadsiah (after six consecutive years in the top-flight).

=== Stadiums and locations ===
Locations of teams in the 2008–09 Saudi Professional League

| Club | Location | Stadium | Capacity |
|---|---|---|---|
| Abha | Abha | Prince Sultan bin Abdulaziz Sports City | 20,000 |
| Al-Ahli | Jeddah | Prince Abdullah Al-Faisal Sports City | 24,000 |
| Al-Ettifaq | Dammam | Prince Mohamed bin Fahd Stadium | 30,000 |
| Al-Hazem | Ar Rass | Al-Hazem Club Stadium | 11,000 |
| Al-Hilal | Riyadh | King Fahd Sports City | 69,000 |
| Al-Ittihad | Jeddah | Prince Abdullah Al-Faisal Sports City | 24,000 |
| Al-Nassr | Riyadh | King Fahd Sports City | 69,000 |
| Al-Raed | Buraidah | King Abdullah Sports City | 35,000 |
| Al-Shabab | Riyadh | King Fahd Sports City | 69,000 |
| Al-Watani | Tabuk | King Khalid Sport City Stadium | 20,000 |
| Al-Wehda | Mecca | King Abdulaziz Sports City | 28,550 |
| Najran | Najran | Prince Hathloul bin Abdulaziz Sports City | 10,000 |

=== Personnel ===
| Club | Head coach | 2007–08 season | Notes |
|---|---|---|---|
| Abha | (Morocco) Idris Obeis | First Division runners-up | |
| Al-Ahli | (Bulgaria) Stoycho Mladenov | 8th | Qualified to the 2008 Gulf Club Champions Cup |
| Al-Ettifaq | (Romania) Ioan Andone | 4th | Qualified to the 2009 AFC Champions League |
| Al-Hazem | (Tunisia) Ammar Souayah | 7th | Qualified to the 2008–09 Arab Champions League |
| Al-Hilal | (Belgium) Georges Leekens | **1st** | Qualified to the 2009 AFC Champions League |
| Al-Ittihad | (Argentina) Gabriel Calderón | 2nd | Qualified to the 2009 AFC Champions League |
| Al-Nassr | (Argentina) Edgardo Bauza | 5th | Qualified to the 2008 Gulf Club Champions Cup |
| Al-Raed | (Brazil) Luis Antônio Zaluar | First Division champions | |
| Al-Shabab | (Argentina) Enzo Trossero | 3rd | Qualified to the 2009 AFC Champions League |
| Al-Watani | (Brazil) Hélio Vieira | 9th | |
| Al-Wehda | (Germany) Theo Bücker | 6th | Qualified to the 2008–09 Arab Champions League |
| Najran | (Tunisia) Mokhtar Tlili | 10th | |

=== Managerial changes ===
| Team | Outgoing manager | Manner of departure | Replaced by | Date |
|---|---|---|---|---|
| Abha | (Morocco) Abdelkader Youmir | Sacked | (Saudi Arabia) Saad Al-Beshri (caretaker) | October 2008 |
| Al-Watani | (Algeria) Moussa Saïb | Sacked | (Tunisia) Habib Ben Romdhane (caretaker) | October 2008 |
| Al-Watani | (Tunisia) Habib Ben Romdhane | Caretaker period ended | (Brazil) Hélio Vieira | November 2008 |
| Abha | (Saudi Arabia) Saad Al-Beshri | Caretaker period ended | (Morocco) Idris Obeis | November 2008 |
| Al-Shabab | (Argentina) Nery Pumpido | Sacked | (Argentina) Enzo Trossero | December 2008 |
| Al-Nassr | (Croatia) Rodion Gačanin | Sacked | (Brazil) Edgar (caretaker) | December 2008 |
| Al-Raed | (Tunisia) Mohammed Aldo | Sacked | (Brazil) Luis Antônio Zaluar | December 2008 |
| Al-Ettifaq | (Portugal) Toni | Sacked | (Romania) Ioan Andone | December 2008 |
| Najran | (Romania) Costică Ștefănescu | Sacked | (Tunisia) Mokhtar Tlili | January 2009 |
| Al-Nassr | (Brazil) Edgar | Caretaker period ended | (Argentina) Edgardo Bauza | January 2009 |
| Al-Hilal | (Romania) Cosmin Olăroiu | Sacked | (Romania) Cătălin Necula (caretaker) | March 2009 |
| Al-Hilal | (Romania) Cătălin Necula | Caretaker period ended | (Belgium) Georges Leekens | April 2009 |

=== Foreign players ===
The number of foreign players was limited to 3 per team, and should not be a goalkeeper. For the January transfer window, the SAFF added an additional slot for a player from one of the AFC countries.

- Players name in **bold** indicates the player was registered during mid-season transfer window.
- Players name in italic indicates the player was de-registered or left their respective clubs during mid-season transfer window.

| Club | Player 1 | Player 2 | Player 3 | AFC Player | Former players |
|---|---|---|---|---|---|
| Abha | (Morocco) Aziz Ayat Aabi | | | | (Morocco) Khalid Zouine |
| Al-Ahli | (Algeria) **Youcef Saïbi** | (Egypt) **Walid Soliman** | (Senegal) **Ibrahima Gueye** | (Jordan) **Baha' Abdel-Rahman** | (Algeria) Adel Maïza (Brazil) Harison (Nigeria) Ndubuisi Eze |
| Al-Ettifaq | (Brazil) Paulo Sérgio | (Ghana) Prince Tagoe | (Morocco) Salaheddine Aqqal | (Syria) **Mohannad Ibrahim** | |
| Al-Hazem | (Morocco) **Karim Eddafi** | (Senegal) Hamad Ji | (Senegal) Mohamed Rebeiz | (Jordan) **Bashar Bani Yaseen** | (France) Kodjo Afanou |
| Al-Hilal | (Libya) Tarik El Taib | (Romania) **Mirel Rădoi** | (Sweden) Christian Wilhelmsson | (South Korea) **Seol Ki-hyeon** | (Bolivia) Ronald Raldes |
| Al-Ittihad | (Brazil) **Renato Cajá** | (Egypt) Emad Moteab | (Morocco) Hicham Aboucherouane | (Oman) Ahmed Hadid Al-Mukhaini | |
| Al-Nassr | (Brazil) Éder Gaúcho | (Brazil) Élton Arábia | (Egypt) **Hossam Ghaly** | (Oman) **Hassan Rabia** | (Benin) Razak Omotoyossi |
| Al-Raed | (Brazil) **Felipe Campos** | (Brazil) **Leandro Sena** | (Ivory Coast) Boris Kabi | (Bahrain) **Saleh Abdulhameed** | (Morocco) Tarik Miri (Morocco) Zakaria Aboub |
| Al-Shabab | (Brazil) Marcelo Camacho | (Brazil) Ricardo Bóvio | (Kuwait) **Ahmad Ajab** | (Qatar) **Talal Al-Bloushi** | (Brazil) Nei |
| Al-Watani | (Brazil) **Josimar** | (Senegal) **Assane Sy** | (Senegal) **Makhete Diop** | (Jordan) **Basem Fathi** | (Guinea) Mamadou Ba Camara (Guinea) Mousa Conde |
| Al-Wehda | (Brazil) **Harison** | (Tunisia) Amir Akrout | (Tunisia) **Mejdi Traoui** | (Syria) **Raja Rafe** | (Libya) Omar Daoud (Senegal) Daouda N'Diaye (Tunisia) Bilel Sabri |
| Najran | (Brazil) Vinícius | (Brazil) Wilsinho | (France) Abdulfatah Safi | (Oman) **Talal Khalfan** | |

== League table ==
| Pos | Team | Pld | W | D | L | GF | GA | GD | Pts | Promotion or relegation |
|---|---|---|---|---|---|---|---|---|---|---|
| 1 | Al-Ittihad (C) | 22 | 17 | 4 | 1 | 57 | 21 | +36 | 55 | Champions and qualified for 2010 AFC Champions League |
| 2 | Al-Hilal | 22 | 15 | 5 | 2 | 41 | 9 | +32 | 50 | Qualified for 2010 AFC Champions League |
| 3 | Al-Ahli | 22 | 11 | 7 | 4 | 33 | 20 | +13 | 40 | Qualified for 2010 AFC Champions League |
| 4 | Al-Shabab | 22 | 10 | 5 | 7 | 37 | 29 | +8 | 35 | Qualified for 2010 AFC Champions League |
| 5 | Al-Nassr | 22 | 10 | 4 | 8 | 24 | 22 | +2 | 34 | |
| 6 | Al-Ettifaq | 22 | 7 | 8 | 7 | 23 | 20 | +3 | 29 | |
| 7 | Al-Wehda | 22 | 7 | 5 | 10 | 33 | 39 | −6 | 26 | |
| 8 | Al-Hazem | 22 | 6 | 7 | 9 | 25 | 31 | −6 | 25 | |
| 9 | Najran | 22 | 6 | 3 | 13 | 22 | 42 | −20 | 21 | |
| 10 | Al-Raed | 22 | 6 | 1 | 15 | 28 | 43 | −15 | 19 | |
| 11 | Abha | 22 | 4 | 7 | 11 | 19 | 40 | −21 | 19 | Relegated |
| 12 | Al-Watani | 22 | 2 | 6 | 14 | 22 | 48 | −26 | 12 | Relegated |

(C) Champions

== Fixtures and results ==
| Home \ Away | ABH | AHL | ETT | HAZ | HIL | ITT | NSR | RAE | SHB | WAT | WHD | NAJ |
|---|---|---|---|---|---|---|---|---|---|---|---|---|
| Abha | | 0–0 | 1–0 | 0–0 | 0–3 | 1–2 | 2–2 | 0–1 | 2–1 | 2–2 | 2–2 | 1–0 |
| Al-Ahli | 2–1 | | 1–1 | 1–0 | 0–1 | 1–2 | 2–1 | 3–2 | 2–1 | 2–0 | 0–0 | 2–0 |
| Al-Ettifaq | 3–1 | 0–0 | | 0–0 | 0–2 | 1–1 | 1–1 | 1–1 | 2–1 | 3–0 | 4–0 | 1–1 |
| Al-Hazem | 2–1 | 1–1 | 1–1 | | 1–2 | 3–3 | 1–0 | 1–0 | 1–1 | 3–0 | 3–1 | 2–1 |
| Al-Hilal | 4–1 | 0–0 | 2–0 | 3–0 | | 1–2 | 2–1 | 2–0 | 2–0 | 0–0 | 0–0 | 7–0 |
| Al-Ittihad | 3–0 | 1–2 | 3–0 | 3–0 | 0–0 | | 1–0 | 5–1 | 2–1 | 7–2 | 2–1 | 3–2 |
| Al-Nassr | 0–1 | 2–1 | 1–0 | 3–1 | 0–2 | 2–2 | | 1–0 | 0–0 | 1–0 | 3–1 | 1–0 |
| Al-Raed | 3–1 | 2–3 | 1–2 | 1–0 | 0–2 | 0–2 | 0–1 | | 0–4 | 3–2 | 6–3 | 0–1 |
| Al-Shabab | 5–0 | 3–2 | 1–0 | 2–0 | 1–1 | 0–4 | 2–1 | 1–4 | | 2–2 | 4–2 | 2–1 |
| Al-Watani | 0–0 | 2–2 | 0–1 | 3–3 | 1–3 | 1–2 | 1–2 | 3–1 | 0–2 | | 0–2 | 3–1 |
| Al-Wehda | 4–1 | 0–2 | 1–0 | 2–1 | 0–1 | 1–3 | 1–2 | 3–1 | 1–1 | 4–0 | | 2–1 |
| Najran | 1–1 | 1–4 | 0–2 | 2–1 | 2–1 | 1–4 | 1–0 | 2–1 | 0–2 | 2–0 | 2–2 | |

Updated to match(es) played on 12 April 2009. Source: Goalzz.com
Legend: Blue = home team win; Yellow = draw; Red = away team win.

== Relegation play-offs ==
Al-Raed, who finished 10th, faced Abha, who finished 11th for a two-legged play-off. The winner on aggregate score after both matches earned entry into the Pro league next season while the loser were relegated to the First Division. Al-Raed won 4–3 on aggregate and retained their place in the next edition.

| Team 1 | Agg. | Team 2 | 1st leg | 2nd leg |
|---|---|---|---|---|
| Abha | 3–4 | Al-Raed | 1–1 | 2–3 |

=== First leg ===
24 April 2009
20:40 (UTC+3)

| Abha | 1–1 | Al-Raed |
|---|---|---|
| Yaseen 20' | Report | Al-Amri 57' |

Prince Sultan bin Abdulaziz Sports City, Abha
Referee: Claudio Circhetta (Switzerland)

=== Second leg ===
30 April 2009
20:40 (UTC+3)

| Al-Raed | 3–2 | Abha |
|---|---|---|
| Campos 37'; Al-Sherif 65'; Kabi 88' | Report | Al-Faraj 2'; Morjan 49' |

King Abdullah Sports City, Buraidah
Referee: Jérôme Laperrière (Switzerland)

Al-Raed won 4–3 on aggregate.

== Season statistics ==
=== Scoring ===
==== Top scorers ====
| Rank | Player | Club | Goals |
|---|---|---|---|
| 1 | (Morocco) Hicham Aboucherouane | Al-Ittihad | 12 |
| 1 | (Saudi Arabia) Nasser Al-Shamrani | Al-Shabab | 12 |
| 3 | (Egypt) Emad Moteab | Al-Ittihad | 10 |
| 3 | (Saudi Arabia) Yasser Al-Qahtani | Al-Hilal | 10 |
| 5 | (Ivory Coast) Boris Kabi | Al-Raed | 9 |
| 5 | (Saudi Arabia) Hassan Al-Raheb | Al-Ahli | 9 |
| 5 | (Saudi Arabia) Naif Hazazi | Al-Ittihad | 9 |
| 5 | (Tunisia) Amir Akrout | Al-Wehda | 9 |
| 9 | (Saudi Arabia) Mohammad Al-Anbar | Al-Hilal | 8 |
| 10 | (Saudi Arabia) Essa Al-Mehyani | Al-Wehda | 7 |
| 10 | (Saudi Arabia) Sultan Al-Nemri | Al-Ittihad | 7 |

==== Hat-tricks ====
| Player | For | Against | Result | Date | Ref |
|---|---|---|---|---|---|
| (Brazil) Nei^{4} | Al-Shabab | Al-Wehda | 4–2 (H) | 4 October 2008 | |
| (Saudi Arabia) Nasser Al-Shamrani | Al-Shabab | Abha | 5–0 (H) | 4 December 2008 | |
| (Morocco) Hicham Aboucherouane | Al-Ittihad | Al-Watani | 7–2 (H) | 15 December 2008 | |
| (Saudi Arabia) Yasser Al-Qahtani^{4} | Al-Hilal | Najran | 7–0 (H) | 20 December 2008 | |

Notes

^{4} Player scored 4 goals
(H) – Home team
(A) – Away team

==== Most assists ====
| Rank | Player | Club | Assists |
|---|---|---|---|
| 1 | (Saudi Arabia) Mohammed Noor | Al-Ittihad | 11 |
| 2 | (Saudi Arabia) Abdoh Otaif | Al-Shabab | 7 |
| 3 | (Saudi Arabia) Ahmed Al-Fraidi | Al-Hilal | 6 |
| 3 | (Sweden) Christian Wilhelmsson | Al-Hilal | 6 |
| 5 | (Senegal) Hamad Ji | Al-Hazem | 5 |
| 5 | (Saudi Arabia) Saleh Al-Saqri | Al-Ittihad | 5 |
| 5 | (Libya) Tarik El Taib | Al-Hilal | 5 |
| 5 | (Morocco) Hicham Aboucherouane | Al-Ittihad | 5 |
| 9 | (Saudi Arabia) Al Hasan Al-Yami | Najran | 4 |
| 9 | (Saudi Arabia) Hassan Al-Raheb | Al-Ahli | 4 |
| 9 | (Saudi Arabia) Essa Al-Mehyani | Al-Wehda | 4 |

=== Clean sheets ===
| Rank | Player | Club | Clean sheets |
|---|---|---|---|
| 1 | (Saudi Arabia) Mohamed Al-Deayea | Al-Hilal | 14 |
| 2 | (Saudi Arabia) Yasser Al-Mosailem | Al-Ahli | 7 |
| 3 | (Saudi Arabia) Mabrouk Zaid | Al-Ittihad | 6 |
| 3 | (Saudi Arabia) Waleed Abdullah | Al-Shabab | 6 |
| 5 | (Saudi Arabia) Saeed Al-Harbi | Al-Hazem | 5 |
| 5 | (Saudi Arabia) Salem Asiri | Abha | 5 |
| 7 | (Saudi Arabia) Adnan Al-Salman | Al-Ettifaq | 3 |
| 7 | (Saudi Arabia) Assaf Al-Qarni | Al-Wehda | 3 |
| 7 | (Saudi Arabia) Jaber Al-Ameri | Najran | 3 |

=== Discipline ===
==== Player ====
- Most yellow cards: 6
  - (Brazil) Harison (Al-Ahli/Al-Wehda)
  - (Saudi Arabia) Abdullah Al-Dossari (Al-Wehda)
  - (Saudi Arabia) Abdullah Huwais (Al-Watani)
  - (Saudi Arabia) Ahmed Al-Fraidi (Al-Hilal)
  - (Saudi Arabia) Ahmed Menawer (Al-Hazem)
  - (Saudi Arabia) Basem Al-Sherif (Al-Raed)
  - (Saudi Arabia) Ibrahim Al-Kaabi (Al-Watani)
  - (Saudi Arabia) Ibrahim Hazzazi (Al-Ahli)
  - (Saudi Arabia) Taisir Al-Jassim (Al-Ahli)
- Most red cards: 2
  - (Saudi Arabia) Naif Al-Qadi (Al-Shabab)
  - (Saudi Arabia) Redha Tukar (Al-Ittihad)
  - (Saudi Arabia) Sultan Al-Balawi (Al-Watani)

==== Club ====
- Most yellow cards: 52
  - Abha
  - Al-Watani
- Most red cards: 7
  - Al-Wehda

== Awards ==
The following awards were given following the conclusion of the season. The awards were known as the Arriyadiyah and Mobily Awards for Sports Excellence and were sponsored by Saudi newspaper Arriyadiyah and Saudi telecommunication company Mobily. The awards were presented on 30 May 2009.

| Award | Winner | Club |
|---|---|---|
| Player of the Season | (gold) (Saudi Arabia) Ahmed Otaif; (silver) (Libya) Tarik El Taib; (bronze) (Saudi Arabia) Osama Hawsawi | Al-Shabab; Al-Hilal; Al-Hilal |
| Young Player of the Season | (gold) (Saudi Arabia) Hamad Al-Hamad; (silver) (Saudi Arabia) Salman Al-Faraj; (bronze) (Saudi Arabia) Mansoor Al-Harbi | Al-Ettifaq; Al-Hilal; Al-Ahli |
| Goldent Boot | (Morocco) Hicham Aboucherouane (Saudi Arabia) Nasser Al-Shamrani | Al-Ittihad; Al-Shabab |

== See also ==
- 2009 King Cup of Champions
- 2008–09 Saudi Crown Prince Cup
