= 2017 Campeonato Brasileiro Série B =

Campeonato Brasileiro Série B
- Season: 2017
- Champions: América Mineiro (2nd Title)
- Promoted: América Mineiro; Internacional; Paraná; Ceará
- Relegated: Luverdense; Santa Cruz; Náutico; ABC
- Top goalscorer: 16 goals Mazinho, Oeste; Bergson, Paysandu
- Biggest home win: Luverdense 4–0 Brasil de Pelotas; R7, 13 June; Paraná 4–0 Santa Cruz; R17, 29 July
- Biggest away win: Guarani 0–4 Paraná; R25, 19 September
- Highest attendance: 56,005 Ceará 1–0 ABC; R38, 25 November
- Lowest attendance: 119 Náutico 1–2 Vila Nova; R37, 18 November
- Total attendance: 2,195,450
- Average attendance: 5,950
- All statistics correct as of 22:38, 4 December 2017 (UTC).

The Serie B of the Brazilian Championship 2017 was a football competition held in Brazil, equivalent to the second division. It was contested by 20 clubs, between 12 May and 25 November. The top four teams were promoted to Série A in 2018 and the bottom four were relegated to Série C in 2018.

América Mineiro were crowned champions.

== Teams ==
Pos.	Relegated from 2016 Serie A
17º	Internacional
18º	Figueirense
19º	Santa Cruz
20º	América Mineiro

Pos.	Promoted from 2016 Serie C
1º	Boa Esporte
2º	Guarani
3°	Juventude
4º	ABC

Location of teams in 2017 Série B

=== Number of teams by state ===
Number of teams	State	Team(s)
3	Rio Grande do Sul	Brasil de Pelotas, Internacional, and Juventude
2	Goiás	Goiás and Vila Nova
2	Minas Gerais	América Mineiro and Boa Esporte
2	Paraná	Londrina and Paraná
2	Pernambuco	Náutico and Santa Cruz
2	São Paulo	Guarani and Oeste
2	Santa Catarina	Figueirense and Criciúma
1	Alagoas	CRB
1	Ceará	Ceará
1	Mato Grosso	Luverdense
1	Rio Grande do Norte	ABC
1	Pará	Paysandu

== Personnel and kits ==
Team	Manager	Kit manufacturer	Shirt sponsor
ABC	(Brazil) Ranielle Ribeiro	(Mexico) Rinat	(Brazil) Caixa
América Mineiro	(Brazil) Enderson Moreira	(Brazil) Lupo	(Brazil) Caixa
Boa Esporte	(Brazil) Sidney Moraes	(Brazil) Embratex	None
Brasil de Pelotas	(Brazil) Clemer	(Brazil) Topper	(Brazil) Caixa
Ceará	(Brazil) Marcelo Chamusca	(Brazil) Penalty	(Brazil) Caixa
CRB	(Brazil) Mazola Júnior	(Mexico) Rinat	(Brazil) Caixa
Criciúma	(Brazil) Grizzo	(Brazil) Embratex	(Brazil) Caixa
Figueirense	(Brazil) Milton Cruz	(Germany) Adidas	(Brazil) Caixa
Goiás	(Brazil) Hélio dos Anjos	(Brazil) Topper	(Brazil) Caixa
Guarani	(Brazil) Lisca	(Brazil) Topper	(Brazil) IESCAMP
Internacional	(Brazil) Odair Hellmann	(United States) Nike	(Brazil) Banrisul
Juventude	(Brazil) Antônio Carlos Zago	(Brazil) 19Treze (homemade)	(Brazil) Banrisul
Londrina	(Brazil) Claudio Tencati	(Brazil) Karilu	(Brazil) Caixa
Luverdense	(Brazil) Júnior Rocha	(Brazil) Kanxa	(Brazil) Sicredi
Náutico	(Brazil) Roberto Fernandes	(Brazil) Topper	(Brazil) Caixa
Oeste	(Brazil) Roberto Cavalo	(Brazil) Deka	None
Paraná Clube	(Brazil) Matheus Costa	(Brazil) Topper	(Brazil) Racco
Paysandu	(Brazil) Marquinhos Santos	(Brazil) Lobo (homemade)	(Brazil) Caixa
Santa Cruz	(Brazil) Adriano Teixeira	(Brazil) Cobra Coral (homemade)	(Brazil) MRV
Vila Nova	(Brazil) Hemerson Maria	(Mexico) Rinat	(Brazil) Caixa

=== Managerial changes ===
Team	Outgoing manager	Manner of departure	Date	Position in table	Incoming manager
Goiás	(Brazil) Sérgio Soares	Sacked	27 May	17th	(Brazil) Sílvio Criciúma
Internacional	(Brazil) Antônio Carlos Zago	Sacked	28 May	17th	(Brazil) Guto Ferreira
Criciúma	(Brazil) Deivid	Sacked	30 May	20th	(Brazil) Luiz Carlos Winck
Santa Cruz	(Brazil) Vinícius Eutrópio	Sacked	10 June	7th	(Brazil) Givanildo Oliveira
CRB	(Brazil) Léo Condé	Sacked	13 June	16th	(Brazil) Dado Cavalcanti
Náutico	(Brazil) Waldemar Lemos	Sacked	14 June	20th	(Brazil) Beto Campos
Figueirense	(Brazil) Márcio Goiano	Sacked	14 June	14th	(Brazil) Marcelo Cabo
Boa Esporte	(Brazil) Julinho Camargo	Sacked	15 June	19th	(Brazil) Nedo Xavier
Ceará	(Brazil) Givanildo Oliveira	Sacked	16 June	8th	(Brazil) Marcelo Chamusca
Paysandu	(Brazil) Marcelo Chamusca	Signed by Ceará	18 June	10th	(Brazil) Marquinhos Santos
Paraná	(Brazil) Cristian de Souza	Sacked	14 July	14th	(Brazil) Lisca
Goiás	(Brazil) Sílvio Criciúma	Mutual consent	19 July	15th	(Brazil) Argel Fucks
ABC	(Brazil) Geninho	Sacked	19 July	19th	(Brazil) Márcio Fernandes
Brasil de Pelotas	(Brazil) Rogério Zimmermann	Sacked	19 July	16th	(Brazil) Clemer
Figueirense	(Brazil) Marcelo Cabo	Sacked	30 July	18th	(Brazil) Milton Cruz
Náutico	(Brazil) Beto Campos	Sacked	30 July	20th	(Brazil) Roberto Fernandes
ABC	(Brazil) Márcio Fernandes	Sacked	21 August	20th	(Brazil) Itamar Schülle
Goiás	(Brazil) Argel Fucks	Mutual consent	25 August	15th	(Brazil) Sílvio Criciúma
Santa Cruz	(Brazil) Givanildo Oliveira	Sacked	26 August	18th	(Brazil) Marcelo Martelotte
Guarani	(Brazil) Vadão	Sacked	29 August	18th	(Brazil) Marcelo Cabo
Paraná	(Brazil) Lisca	Sacked	2 September	5th	(Brazil) Matheus Costa
Goiás	(Brazil) Sílvio Criciúma	Mutual consent	16 September	17th	(Brazil) Hélio dos Anjos
CRB	(Brazil) Dado Cavalcanti	Sacked	17 September	13th	(Brazil) Mazola Júnior
Criciúma	(Brazil) Luiz Carlos Winck	Sacked	18 September	8th	(Brazil) Beto Campos
Guarani	(Brazil) Marcelo Cabo	Sacked	9 October	15th	(Brazil) Lisca
ABC	(Brazil) Itamar Schülle	Sacked	18 October	20th	(Brazil) Ranielle Ribeiro
Juventude	(Brazil) Gilmar Dal Pozzo	Sacked	21 October	8th	(Brazil) Antônio Carlos Zago
Boa Esporte	(Brazil) Nedo Xavier	Mutual consent	9 November	17th	(Brazil) Sidney Moraes
Internacional	(Brazil) Guto Ferreira	Sacked	11 November	2nd	(Brazil) Odair Hellmann
Criciúma	(Brazil) Beto Campos	Sacked	15 November	10th	(Brazil) Grizzo
Santa Cruz	(Brazil) Marcelo Martelotte	Sacked	15 November	18th	(Brazil) Adriano Teixeira

== League table ==
Pos	Team	Pld	W	D	L	GF	GA	GD	Pts	Promotion or relegation
1	América Mineiro (C, P)	38	20	13	5	46	25	+21	73	Promotion to 2018 Campeonato Brasileiro Série A
2	Internacional (P)	38	20	11	7	54	26	+28	71	Promotion to 2018 Campeonato Brasileiro Série A
3	Ceará (P)	38	19	10	9	46	32	+14	67	Promotion to 2018 Campeonato Brasileiro Série A
4	Paraná (P)	38	18	10	10	49	28	+21	64	Promotion to 2018 Campeonato Brasileiro Série A
5	Londrina	38	18	8	12	56	46	+10	62	
6	Oeste	38	14	17	7	43	31	+12	59	
7	Vila Nova	38	15	13	10	38	30	+8	58	
8	Brasil de Pelotas	38	15	6	17	43	50	−7	51	
9	Juventude	38	13	12	13	35	38	−3	51	
10	Boa Esporte	38	12	14	12	40	42	−2	50	
11	Paysandu	38	13	9	16	41	41	0	48	
12	Figueirense	38	12	12	14	44	49	−5	48	
13	Criciúma	38	12	12	14	41	46	−5	48	
14	Goiás	38	12	9	17	35	46	−11	45	
15	CRB	38	12	9	17	35	50	−15	45	
16	Guarani	38	11	11	16	36	46	−10	44	
17	Luverdense (R)	38	10	14	14	38	40	−2	44	Relegation to 2018 Campeonato Brasileiro Série C
18	Santa Cruz (R)	38	8	13	17	43	54	−11	37	Relegation to 2018 Campeonato Brasileiro Série C
19	ABC (R)	38	9	7	22	28	49	−21	34	Relegation to 2018 Campeonato Brasileiro Série C
20	Náutico (R)	38	8	8	22	29	51	−22	32	Relegation to 2018 Campeonato Brasileiro Série C

Updated to match(es) played on 25 November 2017. Source: CBF, Soccerway
Rules for classification: 1) points; 2) wins; 3) goal difference; 4) goals scored; 5) head-to-head results; 6) least red cards received; 7) least yellow cards received; 8) draw.
(C) Champions; (P) Promoted; (R) Relegated

== Results ==
Home \ Away	ABC	AME	BOA	BRP	CEA	CRB	CRI	FIG	GOI	GUA	INT	JUV	LON	LUV	NAU	OES	PAR	PAY	SCR	VIL
ABC		0–1	1–0	1–0	0–1	1–3	3–1	2–2	0–1	0–1	0–3	1–1	3–0	0–1	0–1	2–0	0–0	2–1	0–0	1–0
América Mineiro	2–0		2–0	3–0	1–0	1–0	0–0	4–2	1–1	0–0	1–1	1–0	3–2	2–1	1–0	1–2	1–1	0–2	1–0	1–0
Boa Esporte	2–1	2–2		2–1	4–1	0–0	2–0	1–1	2–0	2–2	0–0	0–2	0–1	1–0	2–1	1–1	2–1	1–2	4–2	0–1
Brasil de Pelotas	3–0	0–0	0–0		2–3	2–0	3–2	1–2	2–1	1–0	0–1	1–0	1–1	0–1	2–0	3–1	2–0	2–1	1–1	3–0
Ceará	1–0	1–1	0–0	2–1		1–0	3–1	2–2	0–1	2–2	0–2	2–0	1–0	1–1	1–0	3–0	1–0	2–0	1–3	2–0
CRB	1–0	2–1	1–1	0–1	1–0		1–2	2–1	1–1	1–1	2–0	2–0	0–3	2–2	2–2	0–1	0–1	2–1	1–0	1–2
Criciúma	2–1	1–3	2–0	1–2	1–1	1–0		1–1	1–0	3–2	2–3	1–2	2–1	2–1	0–0	1–1	2–1	1–1	1–2	0–1
Figueirense	2–0	1–2	0–2	2–0	0–2	3–1	2–2		1–1	2–1	1–2	2–2	3–1	2–3	3–0	0–0	1–0	1–0	2–1	0–1
Goiás	1–2	1–1	4–1	1–1	0–0	3–0	1–1	0–1		1–1	0–2	1–0	0–1	3–1	2–0	0–2	0–1	2–1	2–1	0–2
Guarani	1–1	0–1	2–1	2–0	2–2	2–1	0–0	2–0	1–0		0–2	2–0	2–3	0–0	2–1	0–0	0–4	2–0	2–0	0–0
Internacional	1–1	2–1	0–1	1–0	0–1	0–0	1–1	3–0	3–0	2–0		1–1	3–1	1–0	4–2	2–0	0–0	3–2	2–0	1–1
Juventude	3–0	0–1	0–0	1–2	1–0	1–1	1–0	0–0	3–0	2–0	2–1		0–2	2–1	0–0	0–0	2–1	1–0	2–1	1–0
Londrina	3–1	0–0	2–2	4–1	3–2	4–1	0–1	1–0	2–0	1–0	0–3	2–2		3–1	0–0	1–1	1–1	2–0	1–1	0–1
Luverdense	1–0	0–3	0–1	4–0	0–1	1–1	0–0	3–0	1–2	1–0	2–2	1–0	1–0		3–0	0–0	1–1	1–1	2–2	1–1
Náutico	1–2	0–0	2–0	1–0	0–2	0–1	1–2	2–0	2–3	2–0	0–1	1–1	1–2	1–0		1–1	1–2	1–3	0–0	1–2
Oeste	1–1	0–0	4–1	1–0	0–1	2–0	1–0	1–1	1–1	3–0	0–0	3–0	4–1	0–0	1–0		2–0	1–3	2–0	2–2
Paraná	1–0	1–1	1–1	4–1	1–0	4–1	2–1	1–0	2–0	0–1	1–0	2–0	2–1	2–0	3–0	1–2		0–0	4–0	1–0
Paysandu	2–0	0–1	0–0	2–3	1–2	0–0	1–0	0–1	0–1	1–1	1–0	0–0	1–2	1–1	1–0	2–0	0–0		4–2	1–1
Santa Cruz	2–1	0–1	1–1	3–0	0–0	1–2	1–2	1–1	3–0	2–1	0–0	5–2	1–3	0–0	2–3	2–2	0–0	1–2		1–0
Vila Nova	2–0	2–0	1–0	1–1	1–1	3–0	0–0	1–1	0–0	3–1	2–1	0–0	0–1	2–1	0–1	0–0	3–2	1–2	1–1	

Updated to match(es) played on 25 November 2017. Source: CBF
Legend: Blue = home team win; Yellow = draw; Red = away team win.

== Top scorers ==
As of 25 November 2017

Rank	Player	Club	Goals
1	Mazinho	Oeste	16
1	Bergson	Paysandu	16
3	Henan	Figueirense	12
4	Jonatas Belusso	Londrina	11
4	Tiago Marques	Juventude	11
4	Alan Mineiro	Vila Nova	11
7	Lucão	Criciúma	10
7	William Pottker	Internacional	10
7	Thaciano	Boa Esporte	10
7	Rodolfo	Boa Esporte	10

== Attendances ==
=== Average home attendances ===
Pos.	Team	GP	Total	High	Low	Average
1	Internacional	19	443,240	33,193	8,882	23,328
2	Ceará	19	390,551	56,005	3,457	20,555
3	Paraná	19	205,167	39,414	2,127	10,798
4	Vila Nova	16 (Note: Vila Nova's games in rounds 16, 18 and 20 were behind closed doors.)	116,598	20,550	818	7,287
5	Goiás	14 (Note: Goiás' games in rounds 15, 17, 19, 21 and 23 were behind closed doors.)	86,839	12,586	1,263	6,203
6	Paysandu	19	117,057	12,582	3,010	6,161
7	CRB	19	107,217	13,151	2,284	5,643
8	Santa Cruz	19	78,394	20,415	251	4,126
9	Juventude	19	77,945	10,799	2,162	4,102
10	Figueirense	19	76,751	7,852	1,971	4,040
11	Guarani	17 (Note: Guarani's first two home games were behind closed doors)	63,723	8,673	1,502	3,748
12	Brasil de Pelotas	19	62,923	8,006	1,793	3,312
13	América Mineiro	19	60,745	15,115	952	3,197
14	ABC	19	59,380	7,172	888	3,125
15	Londrina	19	55,434	6,568	495	2,918
16	Criciúma	19	54,429	9,087	1,131	2,865
17	Oeste	19	53,217	10,205	971	2,801
18	Náutico	18 (Note: Náutico's first home game was behind closed doors)	45,231	11,579	119	2,513
19	Luverdense	19	23,350	4,243	212	1,229
20	Boa Esporte	19	17,259	3,602	323	908
-	Total	369	2,195,450	56,005	119	5,950

Updated for games played on 25 November 2017. Paying spectators only.

Source: Boletim Financeiro
