= 2013 Campeonato Brasileiro Série A =

Campeonato Brasileiro Série A
- Season: 2013
- Champions: Cruzeiro; 2nd Campeonato Brasileiro title 3rd Brazilian title
- Relegated: Portuguesa; Vasco da Gama; Ponte Preta; Náutico
- Copa Libertadores: Cruzeiro; Grêmio; Atlético Paranaense; Botafogo; Atlético Mineiro; Flamengo
- Matches: 380
- Goals: 936 (2.46 per match)
- Top goalscorer: Éderson (21 goals)
- Biggest home win: Cruzeiro 5−0 Goiás; Atlético Mineiro 5−0 Náutico; Atlético-PR 6−1 Náutico
- Biggest away win: Náutico 1−5 Santos
- Highest scoring: Internacional 5−3 Vasco; Coritiba 5−3 Ponte Preta; Cruzeiro 5−3 Vasco; Atlético-PR 3−5 Vitória; Cruzeiro 5−3 Criciúma
- Highest attendance: 63,501; Santos 0–0 Flamengo (26 May 2013)
- Lowest attendance: 1,182; Portuguesa 2–1 Fluminense (12 June 2013)
- Average attendance: 15,889

The 2013 Campeonato Brasileiro Série A was the 57th edition of the Campeonato Brasileiro Série A, the top-level of professional football in Brazil. Fluminense came in as the defending champions, having won the title in the 2012 season. On 13 November 2013, Cruzeiro won the title for the club's third time.

For the first time since the league adopted the 20-team, double round-robin format, all four teams promoted from Série B survived.

== Average attendance ==
Club	Average attendance
Cruzeiro	29,315
Flamengo	26,350
Corinthians	25,168
São Paulo FC	23,024
Grêmio	22,301
Fluminense	20,777
Vasco da Gama	19,958
Bahia	18,672
Coritiba	15,571
EC Vitória	14,891
Botafogo	14,748
Goiás EC	13,776
Criciúma EC	11,837
Atlético Mineiro	11,436
Náutico	11,224
Santos FC	10,478
Atlético Paranaense	9,333
Internacional	7,708
AA Ponte Preta	6,414
Portuguesa	4,887

== Format and results ==
For the eleventh consecutive season, the tournament was played in a double round-robin system. In a fashion similar to its second title in 2003, Cruzeiro led the rankings for most of the tournament, declared champion in the fifth to last round. The bottom four teams, Fluminense, Vasco, Ponte Preta and Nautico were relegated to play in the Campeonato Brasileiro Série B in the 2014 season.

The tournament had a one-month interruption between June 9 and July 6 due to the 2013 FIFA Confederations Cup, which took place in Brazil.

Although Flamengo finished the championship just above the relegation positions, it was punished by the Superior Court of Sport Justice for irregularly calling in a player during their final match against Cruzeiro. Flamengo played André Santos, who was suspended due to receiving a red card at a previous Copa do Brasil match. The team lost four points - three for the irregular usage of a player and a fourth one from the tie in the game against Cruzeiro. With the punishment, Flamengo was going to be relegated. However, the day after Flamengo's game, Portuguesa also irregularly called in a player against Grêmio: Héverton. The team also lost four points—three for the irregular usage of a player and a fourth one from the tie in the game against Grêmio. Portuguesa, which had been below Flamengo in the table before both teams' punishments, ended up being relegated instead of Flamengo. With both punishments, Fluminense FC also managed to finish the championship above the relegation positions and was spared from having to compete in the following year's second division. Portuguesa's irregular usage of a player raised many suspicions, both towards Flamengo's—which had also used an irregular player the day before—and Fluminense's side. This relegation was the start to a downhill turn for Portuguesa, as the team was relegated to the Brazilian Third Division - Série C the following year.

=== International qualification ===
The Série A served as a qualifier to CONMEBOL's 2014 Copa Libertadores. Cruzeiro and Gremio qualified to the Second Stage of the competition, while Atletico Paranaense qualified to the First Stage. Botafogo qualified to the First Stage as well since Ponte Preta lost the 2013 Copa Sudamericana Finals.

== Teams ==
Twenty teams competed in the league – the top sixteen teams from the previous season, as well as four teams promoted from the Série B.

=== Stadiums and locations ===
Locations of the 2013 Série A teams

Team	Home city	Stadium	Capacity
Atlético Mineiro	Belo Horizonte	Independência; Arena do Jacaré (one match)	23,018; 19,834
Atlético Paranaense	Curitiba	Vila Capanema; Arena Joinville (3 matches); Vila Olímpica do Boqueirão (one match)	17,000; 20,160; 8,074
Bahia	Salvador	Fonte Nova; Pituaçu (one match); Batistão (one match)	50,025; 32,157; 15,575
Botafogo	Rio de Janeiro	Maracanã; Raulino de Oliveira (2 matches); Mané Garrincha (one match); Arena Pernambuco (one match); São Januário (one match)	78,838; 19,183; 72,788; 45,500; 24,584
Corinthians	São Paulo	Pacaembu; Fonte Luminosa (2 matches); Vail Chaves (2 matches); Novelli Júnior (one match)	37,730; 21,411; 19,900; 18,560
Coritiba	Curitiba	Estádio Couto Pereira	34,872
Criciúma	Criciúma	Heriberto Hülse	19,900
Cruzeiro	Belo Horizonte	Mineirão; Arena do Jacaré (2 matches); Parque do Sabiá (one match); Independência (one match)	61,846; 19,834; 53,350; 23,018
Flamengo	Rio de Janeiro	Maracanã; Mané Garrincha (6 matches); Mário Helênio (one match); Orlando Scarpelli (one match)	78,838; 72,788; 31,863; 19,584
Fluminense	Rio de Janeiro	Maracanã; Moacyrzão (4 matches)	78,838; 15,000
Goiás	Goiânia	Serra Dourada	42,000
Grêmio	Porto Alegre	Arena do Grêmio; Alfredo Jaconi (one match)	55,662; 19,924
Internacional	Porto Alegre	Centenário (11 matches); Estádio do Vale (8 matches)	22,132; 15,000
Náutico	Recife	Arena Pernambuco; Aflitos (2 matches)	45,500; 22,856
Ponte Preta	Campinas	Moisés Lucarelli	19,728
Portuguesa	São Paulo	Canindé; Arena Castelão (one match); Morenão (one match)	21,004; 63,903; 24,000
Santos	Santos	Vila Belmiro; Pacaembu (2 matches); Mané Garrincha (one match); Prudentão (one match)	16,068; 37,730; 72,788; 45,954
São Paulo	São Paulo	Morumbi; Novelli Júnior (2 matches)	67,428; 18,560
Vasco da Gama	Rio de Janeiro	São Januário (7 matches); Maracanã (4 matches); Moacyrzão (3 matches); Mané Garrincha (2 matches); Raulino de Oliveira (2 matches); Ressacada (one match)	24,584; 78,838; 15,000; 72,788; 19,183; 17,826
Vitória	Salvador	Barradão; Arena Fonte Nova (3 matches); Joia da Princesa (one match)	35,000; 50,025; 16,274

=== Personnel and kits ===
Team	Manager	Captain	Kit manufacturer	Shirt sponsor
Atlético Mineiro	(Brazil) Cuca	(Brazil) Réver	Lupo	Banco BMG
Atlético Paranaense	(Brazil) Vágner Mancini	(Brazil) Paulo Baier	Umbro	Caixa
Bahia	(Brazil) Cristóvão Borges	(Brazil) Fahel	Nike	Grupo OAS
Botafogo	(Brazil) Oswaldo de Oliveira	(Brazil) Jefferson	Puma	Guaraviton
Corinthians	(Brazil) Tite	(Brazil) Alessandro	Nike	Caixa
Coritiba	(Brazil) Tcheco	(Brazil) Alex	Nike	Caixa
Criciúma	(Brazil) Argel Fucks	(Brazil) Matheus Ferraz	Kanxa	Dotz
Cruzeiro	(Brazil) Marcelo Oliveira	(Brazil) Fábio	Olympikus	Banco BMG
Flamengo	(Brazil) Jayme de Almeida	(Brazil) Leonardo Moura	Adidas	Caixa
Fluminense	(Brazil) Dorival Júnior	(Brazil) Fred	Adidas	Unimed
Goiás	(Brazil) Enderson Moreira	(Brazil) Amaral	Puma	Philco
Grêmio	(Brazil) Renato Gaúcho	(Brazil) Zé Roberto	Topper	Banrisul
Internacional	(Brazil) Clemer	(Argentina) Andrés D'Alessandro	Nike	Banrisul
Náutico	(Brazil) Marcelo Martelotte	(Brazil) Martinez	Penalty	Philco
Ponte Preta	(Brazil) Jorginho	(Brazil) William	Pulse	Hitachi
Portuguesa	(Brazil) Guto Ferreira	(Brazil) Valdomiro	Lupo	Irwin
Santos	(Brazil) Claudinei Oliveira	(Brazil) Edu Dracena	Nike	None
São Paulo	(Brazil) Muricy Ramalho	(Brazil) Rogério Ceni	Penalty	Semp Toshiba
Vasco da Gama	(Brazil) Adílson Batista	(Brazil) Juninho	Penalty	Eletrobras/Caixa
Vitória	(Brazil) Ney Franco	(Brazil) Victor Ramos	Penalty	Grupo OAS/Caixa

=== Managerial changes ===
Team	Outgoing manager	Manner of departure	Date of vacancy	Position in table	Replaced by
Santos	(Brazil) Muricy Ramalho	Sacked	31 May	14th	(Brazil) Claudinei Oliveira
Náutico	(Brazil) Silas	Sacked	2 June	20th	(Brazil) Zé Teodoro
Flamengo	(Brazil) Jorginho	Sacked	5 June	19th	(Brazil) Mano Menezes
Ponte Preta	(Brazil) Guto Ferreira	Sacked	6 June	16th	(Brazil) Paulo César Carpegiani
Grêmio	(Brazil) Vanderlei Luxemburgo	Sacked	29 June	7th	(Brazil) Renato Gaúcho
São Paulo	(Brazil) Ney Franco	Sacked	5 July	6th	(Brazil) Paulo Autuori
Atlético/PR	(Brazil) Ricardo Drubscky	Sacked	8 July	19th	(Brazil) Alberto (caretaker)
Vasco da Gama	(Brazil) Paulo Autuori	Resigned / Left to sign with São Paulo	9 July	14th	(Brazil) Dorival Júnior
Atlético/PR	(Brazil) Alberto	Replaced	14 July	19th	(Brazil) Vágner Mancini
Portuguesa	(Brazil) Edson Pimenta	Sacked	28 July	20th	(Brazil) Guto Ferreira
Fluminense	(Brazil) Abel Braga	Sacked	29 July	17th	(Brazil) Vanderlei Luxemburgo
Náutico	(Brazil) Zé Teodoro	Sacked	14 August	20th	(Brazil) Jorginho
Criciúma	(Brazil) Vadão	Sacked	23 August	17th	(Brazil) Sílvio Criciúma
Ponte Preta	(Brazil) Paulo César Carpegiani	Resigned	24 August	17th	(Brazil) Jorginho
Vitória	(Brazil) Caio Júnior	Sacked	1 September	10th	(Brazil) Ney Franco
Náutico	(Brazil) Jorginho	Resigned	5 September	20th	(Brazil) Levi Gomes
São Paulo	(Brazil) Paulo Autuori	Resigned	9 September	18th	(Brazil) Muricy Ramalho
Flamengo	(Brazil) Mano Menezes	Resigned	19 September	15th	(Brazil) Jayme de Almeida
Náutico	(Brazil) Levi Gomes	Replaced	22 September	20th	(Brazil) Marcelo Martelotte
Criciúma	(Brazil) Sílvio Criciúma	Sacked	24 September	17th	(Brazil) Argel Fucks
Coritiba	(Brazil) Marquinhos Santos	Sacked	24 September	12th	(Brazil) Marcelo Serrano (caretaker)
Coritiba	(Brazil) Marcelo Serrano	Replaced	30 September	14th	(Brazil) Péricles Chamusca
Internacional	(Brazil) Dunga	Sacked	4 October	10th	(Brazil) Clemer
Vasco da Gama	(Brazil) Dorival Júnior	Sacked	28 October	18th	(Brazil) Adílson Batista
Fluminense	(Brazil) Vanderlei Luxemburgo	Sacked	11 November	18th	(Brazil) Dorival Júnior
Coritiba	(Brazil) Péricles Chamusca	Sacked	17 November	15th	(Brazil) Tcheco

== League table ==
Pos	Team	Pld	W	D	L	GF	GA	GD	Pts	Qualification or relegation
1	Cruzeiro (C)	38	23	7	8	77	37	+40	76	2014 Copa Libertadores Second Stage (Note: Atlético Mineiro is qualified for the second stage of the 2014 Copa Libertadores as the 2013 Copa Libertadores champion. Flamengo is qualified for the second stage of the 2014 Copa Libertadores as the 2013 Copa do Brasil champion.)
2	Grêmio	38	18	11	9	42	35	+7	65	2014 Copa Libertadores Second Stage
3	Atlético Paranaense	38	18	10	10	65	49	+16	64	2014 Copa Libertadores First Stage
4	Botafogo	38	17	10	11	55	41	+14	61	2014 Copa Libertadores First Stage
5	Vitória	38	16	11	11	59	53	+6	59	
6	Goiás	38	16	11	11	48	44	+4	59	
7	Santos	38	15	12	11	51	38	+13	57	
8	Atlético Mineiro	38	15	12	11	49	38	+11	57	2014 Copa Libertadores Second Stage
9	São Paulo	38	14	8	16	39	40	−1	50	
10	Corinthians	38	11	17	10	27	22	+5	50	
11	Coritiba	38	12	12	14	42	45	−3	48	
12	Bahia	38	12	12	14	37	45	−8	48	
13	Internacional	38	11	15	12	51	52	−1	48	
14	Criciúma	38	13	7	18	49	63	−14	46	
15	Fluminense	38	12	10	16	43	47	−4	46	
16	Flamengo	38	12	13	13	43	46	−3	45 (Note: Flamengo and Portuguesa were punished for selecting suspended players in Round 38. Each club lost 4 points.)	2014 Copa Libertadores Second Stage
17	Portuguesa (R)	38	12	12	14	50	46	+4	44	Relegation to Série B
18	Vasco da Gama (R)	38	11	11	16	50	61	−11	44	Relegation to Série B
19	Ponte Preta (R)	38	9	10	19	37	55	−18	37	Relegation to Série B
20	Náutico (R)	38	5	5	28	22	79	−57	20	Relegation to Série B

Updated to match(es) played on unknown. Source: Soccerway.com
Rules for classification: 1st points; 2nd wins; 3rd goal difference; 4th goals scored; 5th head-to-head results; 6th least red cards received; 7th least yellow cards received; 8th draw.
(C) Champions; (R) Relegated

== Results ==
Home \ Away	CAM	CAP	BAH	BOT	COR	CTB	CRI	CRU	FLA	FLU	GOI	GRE	INT	NAU	PON	POR	SAN	SPA	VAS	VIT
Atlético Mineiro		1–2	2–0	2–2	0–0	3–0	3–2	1–0	1–0	2–2	4–1	2–0	2–1	5–0	4–0	2–1	3–1	0–0	2–1	2–2
Atlético Paranaense	1–0		1–0	2–0	1–1	2–1	2–1	2–2	2–2	1–1	2–0	1–1	1–0	6–1	1–0	1–0	2–1	3–0	5–1	3–5
Bahia	0–0	1–1		2–1	0–2	0–0	2–2	1–3	3–0	1–2	2–1	0–3	2–0	2–0	1–1	1–0	0–0	0–1	0–0	2–0
Botafogo	1–0	4–0	1–2		1–0	3–1	3–0	2–1	2–1	1–0	1–1	0–1	3–3	2–0	0–1	0–0	2–1	0–0	2–2	2–0
Corinthians	0–1	0–0	2–0	1–1		1–0	1–0	0–0	4–0	1–0	1–2	2–0	0–0	0–0	1–0	0–0	1–1	0–0	0–0	2–0
Coritiba	2–1	1–0	2–2	2–1	0–1		1–2	2–1	0–2	2–1	2–2	4–0	0–0	1–0	5–3	1–1	1–0	2–0	0–1	1–1
Criciúma	1–1	2–1	3–1	1–2	0–2	2–1		1–2	0–3	1–2	0–0	2–1	0–1	3–0	1–1	1–3	3–1	1–0	3–2	1–1
Cruzeiro	4–1	1–0	1–2	3–0	1–0	1–0	5–3		1–0	1–0	5–0	3–0	2–2	3–0	2–2	4–0	0–0	0–2	5–3	5–1
Flamengo	3–0	2–4	2–1	1–1	1–0	2–2	4–1	1–1		1–0	1–1	0–1	2–1	0–1	0–2	1–1	2–1	0–0	1–1	2–1
Fluminense	2–2	2–1	1–0	1–1	0–0	1–1	3–0	1–0	2–3		2–1	1–1	2–3	2–0	1–1	2–1	0–2	2–1	1–3	2–3
Goiás	0–0	3–0	3–1	1–0	1–1	1–1	1–1	1–2	1–1	1–2		2–0	3–1	2–1	2–0	2–1	0–3	1–0	1–1	1–0
Grêmio	0–1	1–0	0–0	2–1	1–0	0–1	1–2	3–1	2–1	2–0	1–0		1–1	2–0	1–0	3–2	1–1	1–1	1–0	1–0
Internacional	0–0	2–2	1–2	2–1	1–0	0–0	2–0	1–2	1–0	1–0	3–3	2–2		4–1	0–0	0–1	1–2	2–3	5–3	2–2
Náutico	0–0	1–4	0–1	1–3	1–0	3–0	0–1	1–4	0–0	0–1	0–2	0–2	3–0		1–3	2–2	1–5	0–1	0–3	0–3
Ponte Preta	2–0	3–4	0–0	0–2	2–0	1–0	3–1	0–2	1–1	1–1	0–1	1–1	1–3	1–2		0–2	1–0	0–2	2–1	0–3
Portuguesa	2–0	2–3	4–2	1–3	4–0	0–0	1–1	1–1	0–0	2–1	1–2	0–0	1–1	3–0	2–1		3–0	2–1	2–0	1–1
Santos	1–0	2–1	3–0	1–2	1–1	2–2	2–1	0–1	0–0	1–0	1–0	1–1	0–0	1–1	2–1	4–1		3–0	1–1	2–0
São Paulo	1–0	1–1	1–2	1–1	0–0	0–1	1–2	0–3	2–0	2–1	0–1	0–1	0–1	3–0	1–0	2–1	0–2		5–1	3–2
Vasco da Gama	2–0	0–0	1–1	2–3	1–1	2–1	3–2	2–1	0–1	1–0	0–2	2–3	3–1	2–0	1–1	1–0	2–2	0–2		1–2
Vitória	1–1	3–2	0–0	1–0	1–1	2–1	0–1	1–3	4–2	1–1	2–1	0–0	2–2	2–1	3–1	2–1	2–0	3–2	2–0	

Updated to match(es) played on 24 November 2013. Source: CBF
Legend: Blue = home team win; Yellow = draw; Red = away team win.

== Positions by round ==
Team ╲ Round	1	2	3	4	5	6	7	8	9	10	11	12	13	14	15	16	17	18	19	20	21	22	23	24	25	26	27	28	29	30	31	32	33	34	35	36	37	38
Cruzeiro	1	2	7	2	5	5	4	3	1	4	2	1	1	2	2	1	1	1	1	1	1	1	1	1	1	1	1	1	1	1	1	1	1	1	1	1	1	1
Grêmio	3	7	8	5	7	8	6	8	7	7	9	9	7	4	3	3	2	4	3	3	3	3	4	2	2	2	2	3	2	2	3	3	3	3	2	3	2	2
Atlético Paranaense	14	13	14	12	15	19	19	18	16	10	8	5	5	7	5	4	3	2	4	4	4	4	3	4	4	3	4	4	3	3	4	2	2	2	4	2	3	3
Botafogo	10	5	3	6	3	1	3	1	3	1	1	2	2	1	1	2	4	3	2	2	2	2	2	3	3	4	3	2	4	4	2	4	4	5	5	5	5	4
Vitória	8	3	2	4	2	3	2	5	6	6	6	4	8	5	7	9	10	12	12	13	11	6	9	6	6	6	6	6	5	7	6	7	6	7	6	7	6	5
Goiás	20	17	17	14	17	12	13	9	10	11	13	10	12	12	9	10	9	7	8	9	8	9	6	10	12	13	9	8	6	5	5	5	5	4	3	4	4	6
Santos	12	14	15	18	16	10	8	7	9	13	14	14	15	16	15	13	11	13	9	7	9	11	7	9	7	8	10	9	9	8	8	9	9	9	10	8	8	7
Atlético Mineiro	14	18	19	20	18	13	9	10	13	16	17	16	16	15	14	12	13	15	16	10	10	12	8	5	5	5	5	5	7	6	7	6	7	6	7	6	7	8
São Paulo	3	1	1	3	6	9	14	16	18	18	18	18	19	19	19	18	19	18	18	18	16	14	15	16	17	16	16	15	12	10	9	8	8	8	8	9	9	9
Corinthians	10	12	5	13	13	7	12	13	11	9	7	8	4	6	4	5	5	5	5	6	6	7	11	13	9	9	12	11	13	12	12	12	12	10	9	10	10	10
Flamengo	12	16	16	19	14	18	11	15	15	17	12	13	11	11	12	14	15	14	15	11	13	15	16	15	11	12	7	10	10	11	11	10	11	12	12	11	11	11
Portuguesa	16	19	18	17	12	15	18	19	20	19	19	19	17	18	18	19	17	17	17	17	18	16	14	12	14	10	13	14	11	13	14	14	14	13	13	14	13	12
Coritiba	5	6	5	1	1	2	1	2	4	2	3	3	3	3	6	6	6	8	7	8	7	8	12	14	15	15	15	16	16	14	13	13	13	14	17	17	16	13
Bahia	17	15	10	7	8	11	7	6	5	3	5	7	9	10	10	7	8	11	13	15	14	13	10	11	13	14	11	12	14	16	15	15	15	17	16	13	12	14
Internacional	8	4	9	11	11	6	5	4	2	5	4	6	6	8	8	8	7	6	6	5	5	5	5	7	10	7	8	7	8	9	10	11	10	11	11	12	14	15
Criciúma	2	9	12	9	10	17	16	12	14	14	16	17	18	17	17	16	12	9	11	12	15	17	17	17	18	18	18	17	17	18	19	19	17	15	14	15	15	16
Fluminense	5	8	4	8	4	4	10	14	17	12	11	12	14	14	13	15	16	16	14	16	12	10	13	8	8	11	14	13	15	15	16	16	18	16	15	16	18	17
Vasco da Gama	7	11	13	10	9	14	17	11	8	8	10	11	10	9	11	11	14	10	10	14	17	18	18	18	16	17	17	18	18	17	18	17	16	18	18	18	17	18
Ponte Preta	18	10	11	16	20	16	15	17	12	15	15	15	13	13	16	17	18	19	19	19	19	19	19	19	19	19	19	19	19	19	17	18	19	19	19	19	19	19
Náutico	18	20	20	15	19	20	20	20	19	20	20	20	20	20	20	20	20	20	20	20	20	20	20	20	20	20	20	20	20	20	20	20	20	20	20	20	20	20

Source: Globo Esporte

== Top scorers ==
Rank	Player	Club	Goals
1	(Brazil) Éderson	Atlético Paranaense	21
2	(Brazil) Dinei	Vitória	16
2	(Brazil) Hernane	Flamengo	16
4	(Brazil) Cícero	Santos	15
4	(Brazil) Fernandão	Bahia	15
6	(Brazil) Gilberto	Portuguesa	14
6	(Brazil) William	Ponte Preta	14
8	(Brazil) Walter	Goiás	13
9	(Brazil) Alex	Coritiba	12
9	(Brazil) André	Vasco da Gama	12
