= Jorge Ferreira =

Jorge Ferreira is the name of:

- Jorge Isaac Baltazar Ferreira or Jorge Baltazar, Mexican squash player
- Jorge Ferreira (footballer) (born 1966), Portuguese football player
- Jorge Ferreira (football manager) (born 1984), Brazilian football manager
- Jorge Ferreira, is a Portuguese popular music singer and songwriter
