= Paulo Baier =

Brazilian footballer (born 1974)

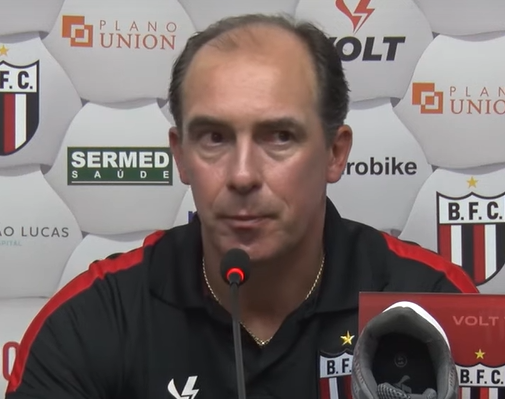
- Baier in 2022

Personal information
- Full name: Paulo César Baier
- Date of birth: 25 October 1974 (age 52)
- Place of birth: Ijuí, Rio Grande do Sul, Brazil
- Height: 1.81 m (5 ft 11 in)
- Position: Attacking midfielder

Team information
- Current team: Monsoon (head coach)

Youth career
- 1991–1993: São Luiz-RS

Senior career*
Years	Team	Apps	(Gls)
1993–1997	São Luiz-RS		
1997–1998	Criciúma	51	(7)
1998	Atlético Mineiro	16	(1)
1999–2001	Botafogo	6	(0)
1999	→ Vasco da Gama (loan)	13	(1)
2000	→ América Mineiro (loan)	23	(0)
2001	Atlético Mineiro	16	(0)
2001	→ América Mineiro (loan)	4	(0)
2002	Pelotas	3	(0)
2002–2003	Criciúma	71	(22)
2004–2005	Goiás	109	(38)
2006–2007	Palmeiras	54	(14)
2007–2008	Goiás	79	(30)
2009	Sport Recife	14	(4)
2009–2013	Atlético Paranaense	173	(57)
2014	Criciúma	36	(9)
2015	Ypiranga	9	(6)
2015	Juventude	12	(2)
2016	São Luiz-RS	16	(6)
Total		701	(197)

Managerial career
- 2018: Toledo
- 2018: Próspera
- 2019: Brusque
- 2020: Toledo
- 2020–2021: Próspera
- 2021: Criciúma
- 2022: São José-RS
- 2022–2023: Botafogo-SP
- 2023: Figueirense
- 2024: Juventus de Jaraguá
- 2025: Hercílio Luz
- 2025: Juventus Jaraguá
- 2026–: Monsoon
- * Club domestic league appearances and goals

Paulo César Baier (born 25 October 1974) is a Brazilian football manager and former player who played as an attacking midfielder. He is the current head coach of Monsoon.

Baier's 21-year career started in 1995 with São Luiz-RS, as a right back. Mainly associated to Criciúma, Goiás and Atlético Paranaense, he scored totals of 106 goals since the establishment of the round-robin format of the Série A, being the second-best in the tournament's history.

== Playing career ==
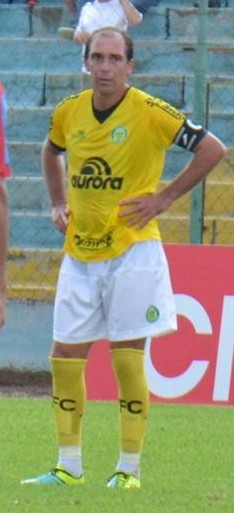
Baier playing for Ypiranga in 2015

Baier was born in Ijuí, Rio Grande do Sul, of German descent. Started his career at the age of 12, training with Gaúcho's youth setup. In 1991, after representing hometown amateur sides Esporte Clube Flamengo Vila Santo Antônio and Sociedade Recreativa Esportiva Chorão, he went on a trial at São Luiz.

Baier subsequently joined the club's youth setup, but was converted into a right back during his formation. Promoted to the first team in 1995 and known as Paulo César, he was regularly used during his two-year spell.

In 1997, Baier joined Série A side Criciúma, after impressing in a friendly match against the club. He made his debut for the club on 5 July, starting in a 1–1 away draw against América-RN, and scored his first goal on 12 October, netting the last in a 2–0 home defeat of Bahia.

In the middle of 1998, after winning the year's Campeonato Catarinense, Baier moved to Atlético Mineiro (two stints). Sparingly used, he subsequently represented Botafogo, Vasco da Gama, América Mineiro and Pelotas before returning to Criciúma in 2002.

As the club already had a Paulo César in the squad, he was initially known as Paulo César Baier, but it was "too long". He then started to be called as Paulo Baier, and was a regular starter as the club won the year's Série B. In the final, he scored a hat-trick in a 4–1 home routing of Fortaleza.

Ahead of the 2004 season, Baier moved to Goiás also in the main category. He scored a career-best 15 league goals during the campaign, and added a further eight in 2005; in the latter year he also finished the Campeonato Goiano as the top goalscorer, with 12 goals.

On 7 December 2005, Baier signed a two-year deal with Palmeiras. On 16 March 2007, after having unpaid wages, he returned to his previous club Goiás.

On 5 January 2009, Baier moved to Sport, but rescinded his contract in June after several altercations with manager Nelsinho Baptista. He then moved to Atlético Paranaense. On 30 December 2013, aged 39, Baier returned to Criciúma after his contract with Atlético expired. A regular starter, he scored nine goals in all competitions, as his side suffered relegation.

Baier represented clubs in his native state in his two last campaigns, playing for Ypiranga, Juventude and first club São Luiz. He announced his retirement on 7 June 2016, at the age of 41, and finished his 21-year career as the second-best goalscorer of the Série A in the round-robin format, with 106 goals.

== Managerial career ==
On 12 February 2017, Baier was announced as the new manager of Panambi, but turned down the offer the following day. On 14 August, he was named manager of Toledo Colônia Work, but only took over the club in December.

On 1 August 2018, Baier was named manager of Criciúma's neighbouring side Próspera, and won the third division of the Campeonato Catarinense in his first season in charge. He left in 2019 to take over Brusque, and returned to Toledo in 2020.

Back at Próspera in 2020, Baier led the club to the title of the second division of the Catarinense. On 4 May 2021, he returned to Criciúma after six years, but now as manager.

On 4 October 2021, despite leading Criciúma to the final stages of the 2021 Série C, Baier was sacked. On 14 February 2022, he replaced Pingo at the helm of his first professional side São José, but was himself sacked on 15 March.

On 23 May 2022, Baier replaced Leandro Zago at the helm of Botafogo-SP also in the third division. He led the club to a promotion in the 2022 Série C, but was sacked on 21 February 2023, despite leading their group in the 2023 Campeonato Paulista.

On 14 June 2023, Baier was named in charge of Figueirense, still in division three. He left on 30 October, after the club opted to not renew his contract.

== Personal life ==
Baier's younger brother Éder was also a footballer. He also represented São Luiz.

== Career statistics ==
As of 19 October 2018

Club	Season	League			State League		National Cup		Continental		Other		Total	
Club	Season	Division	Apps	Goals	Apps	Goals	Apps	Goals	Apps	Goals	Apps	Goals	Apps	Goals
Criciúma	1997	Série A	22	1	—		—		—		—		22	1
Criciúma	1998	Série B	2	0	27	6	—		—		—		29	6
Criciúma	Total		24	1	27	6	—		—		—		51	7
Atlético Mineiro	1998	Série A	16	1	—		—		—		—		16	1
Botafogo	1999	Série A	0	0	6	0	—		—		7 (Note: Appearance(s) in Torneio Rio – São Paulo)	0	13	0
Vasco da Gama	1999	Série A	13	1	—		—		5 (Note: Appearance(s) in Copa Mercosur)	1	—		18	2
América Mineiro	2000	Série A	19	0	0	0	—		—		0	0	19	0
Atlético Mineiro	2001	Série A	0	0	16	0	3	0	—		7 (Note: Appearance(s) in Copa Sul-Minas)	2	26	2
América Mineiro	2001	Série A	4	0	—		—		—		—		4	0
Pelotas	2002	Gaúcho	—		3	0	—		—		13	1	16	1
Criciúma	2002	Série B	24	9	6	1	—		—		—		30	10
Criciúma	2003	Série A	31	9	10	3	3	2	—		—		44	14
Criciúma	Total		55	18	16	4	3	2	—		—		74	24
Goiás	2004	Série A	40	15	18	3	3	0	4 (Note: Appearance(s) in Copa Sudamericana)	2	—		65	20
Goiás	2005	Série A	32	8	19	12	—		2	1	—		53	22
Goiás	Total		72	23	37	15	3	0	6	3	—		118	42
Palmeiras	2006	Série A	31	10	15	2	—		10 (Note: Appearance(s) in Copa Libertadores)	0	—		56	12
Palmeiras	2007	Série A	0	0	8	2	0	0	—		—		8	2
Palmeiras	Total		31	10	23	4	0	0	10	0	—		64	14
Goiás	2007	Série A	34	13	—		—		4	4	—		38	17
Goiás	2008	Série A	29	14	16	3	4	4	—		—		49	21
Goiás	Total		63	27	16	3	4	4	4	4	—		87	38
Sport Recife	2009	Série A	2	0	12	4	—		7	1	—		21	5
Atlético Paranaense	2009	Série A	29	8	—		—		1	0	—		30	8
Atlético Paranaense	2010	Série A	31	10	10	1	3	1	—		—		44	12
Atlético Paranaense	2011	Série A	22	5	17	10	5	3	—		—		44	18
Atlético Paranaense	2012	Série B	26	8	11	5	3	0	—		—		40	13
Atlético Paranaense	2013	Série A	27	10	0	0	9	4	—		—		36	14
Atlético Paranaense	Total		135	41	38	16	20	8	1	0	—		194	65
Criciúma	2014	Série A	22	4	14	5	1	0	1	0	—		38	9
Ypiranga-RS	2015	Série D	0	0	9	6	—		—		—		9	6
Juventude	2015	Série C	12	2	—		—		—		—		12	2
São Luiz-RS	2016	Gaúcho A2	—		16	6	—		—		—		16	6
Career total			468	128	233	69	34	14	34	9	27	3	796	224

== Honours ==
=== Player ===
Criciúma

- Campeonato Catarinense: 1998
- Campeonato Brasileiro Série B: 2002

Botafogo

- Torneio Rio-São Paulo: 1999

América Mineiro

- Copa Sul Minas: 2000

Sport

- Campeonato Pernambucano: 2009

=== Manager ===
Próspera

- Campeonato Catarinense Série C: 2018
- Campeonato Catarinense Série B: 2020

=== Individual ===
- Bola de Prata: 2004
- Campeonato Goiano top goalscorer: 2005 (12 goals)
- Campeonato Brasileiro Série A Team of the Year: 2013
