= Wilton Bezerra =

Brazilian football coach

Personal information
- Full name: Wilton Bezerra da Silva Neto
- Date of birth: 19 September 1979 (age 47)
- Place of birth: Recife, Brazil

Team information
- Current team: Santa Cruz (assistant)

Managerial career
- Years: Team
- 2005–2010: Santa Cruz (youth)
- 2010: Santa Cruz (assistant)
- 2010–2011: América de Natal (assistant)
- 2011: Central (assistant)
- 2011: Icasa (assistant)
- 2012: Ypiranga-PE (assistant)
- 2012: Luverdense (assistant)
- 2013: Mogi Mirim (assistant)
- 2013: Paraná (assistant)
- 2014: Coritiba (assistant)
- 2014: Ponte Preta (assistant)
- 2014: Náutico (assistant)
- 2015: Ceará (assistant)
- 2015–2016: Paysandu (assistant)
- 2016: Paysandu (assistant)
- 2017: Náutico (assistant)
- 2017: CRB (assistant)
- 2018: Paysandu (assistant)
- 2018–2019: Sport Recife U20
- 2019: América-PE
- 2020–2021: São Paulo Crystal
- 2021–2023: Paysandu (assistant)
- 2021: Paysandu (interim)
- 2021: Paysandu (interim)
- 2023: Paysandu (interim)
- 2024: Castanhal
- 2024: Jaguar
- 2025–2026: Retrô (assistant)
- 2025: Retrô (interim)
- 2026–: Santa Cruz (assistant)

Wilton Bezerra da Silva Neto (born 19 September 1979) is a Brazilian football coach. He is the current assistant coach of Santa Cruz.

== Career ==
Born in Recife, Pernambuco, Bezerra began his career as a youth coach at Santa Cruz in 2005. In 2010, when Dado Cavalcanti became the first team head coach of Santa, he became his assistant, and subsequently worked along Cavalcanti as his assistant at several clubs for nearly ten years.

On 10 May 2018, Bezerra ended his relationship with Paysandu to join Sport Recife as an assistant coach of under-20 and under-23 squads. On 17 July, however, he was named head coach of the under-20 side.

On 12 February 2019, Bezerra was appointed head coach of América-PE. On 19 February 2020, he took over São Paulo Crystal.

Bezerra was announced as head coach of SP Crystal for the 2021 season, but was dismissed on 10 March of that year before the season started. He returned to Paysandu on 8 April, again as an assistant.

Bezerra was an interim head coach of Papão in May 2021 after Itamar Schülle was sacked, but returned to his previous role after Vinícius Eutrópio was appointed head coach. On 18 October, he was definitely appointed head coach after Roberto Fonseca was sacked.

== Honours ==
Paysandu

- Campeonato Paraense: 2021

Jaguar

- Campeonato Pernambucano Série A2: 2024
