= Habib Ben Romdhane =

Tunisian footballer and manager

Personal information
- Full name: Habib Ledhili Ben Romdhane
- Date of birth: 9 July 1970 (age 56)
- Place of birth: Kairouan, Tunisia
- Position: Defender

Team information
- Current team: Al-Zulfi (manager)

Youth career
- JS Kairouan

Senior career*
Years	Team	Apps	(Gls)
1987–2001	JS Kairouan		

Managerial career
- 2004–2005: Al-Shoulla (assistant)
- 2005–2008: Al-Watani (assistant)
- 2008: Al-Watani (caretaker)
- 2008–2009: Al-Watani (assistant)
- 2009: Al-Watani
- 2010: Najran (assistant)
- 2011: Al-Adalah
- 2012: Al-Najma
- 2012–2014: Al-Riyadh
- 2014–2016: Al-Batin
- 2016: Al-Tai
- 2016–2017: Al-Fayha
- 2017–2018: Al-Hazem
- 2018: JS Kairouan
- 2018–2019: Najran
- 2019–2020: Al-Ain
- 2020–2021: Al-Fayha
- 2021–2022: Al-Wehda
- 2022–2023: Al-Qadsiah
- 2025: Ohod
- 2025–: Al-Zulfi
- * Club domestic league appearances and goals

Habib Ben Romdhane (Arabic: الحبيب بن رمضان; born 9 July 1970) is a Tunisian football coach and former player who played for JS Kairouan. He is the current manager of Saudi FDL club Al-Zulfi.

== Career ==
Ben Romdhane spent his whole playing career for JS Kairouan. He made his debut in 1987 aged 17 years old and retired in 2001.

Ben Romdhane began his managerial career in 2004 working as Mourad Okbi's assistant at Al-Shoulla. In 2005, Ben Romdhane moved to Al-Watani to once again work as Okbi's assistant manager. On 3 August 2006, Ben Romdhane joined Al-Watani to work as Aboud El Khodary's assistant. Working as Al-Watani's assistant manager, Ben Romdhane managed to achieve promotion to the Saudi Premier League for the first time in the club's history. Ben Romdhane continued to work as Al-Watani's assistant, first under El Khodary during the 2007–08 season and then under Moussa Saïb during the 2008–09 season. Following Saïb's departure, Ben Romdhane was named as caretaker manager on 21 October 2008. On 29 November 2008, Ben Romdhane was named as Hélio Vieira's assistant. On 11 July 2009, Ben Romdhane was named as Al-Watani's manager following their relegation to the First Division. On 17 November 2009, Ben Romdhane was relieved from his duties and was replaced by Aboud El Khodary. On 11 January 2010, Ben Romdhane returned to work as Okbi's assistant at Najran.

In August 2011, Ben Romdhane was appointed as Saudi Second Division side Al-Adalah's manager. He was sacked on 1 December 2011. On 28 June 2012, Ben Romdhane was appointed as Saudi First Division side Al-Najma's manager. On 10 November 2012, Ben Romdhane was sacked from his post after a poor run of form which saw his side win just 2 games out of 9. He was replaced by compatriot Lotfi Kadri. On 12 December 2012, Ben Romdahne was appointed as Al-Riyadh's manager until the end of the 2012–13 season. Ben Romdhane managed to lead Al-Riyadh to a joint second place finish, however, they missed out on promotion after losing in the playoffs. On 31 May 2013, Ben Romdhane renewed his contract with Al-Riyadh for another season. On 2 September 2014, Ben Romdhane was appointed as Al-Batin's manager. On 12 February 2016, Ben Romdhane was sacked by Al-Batin despite winning their match against Al-Orobah on the same day. At the time of his sacking, Al-Batin sat in second place, one point behind first placed Al-Mujazzal. On 25 February 2016, Ben Romdhane was appointed as Al-Tai's manager until the end of the 2015–16 season.

On 2 May 2016, Ben Romdhane was appointed as Al-Fayha's manager. He managed to lead Al-Fayha to the First Division title and their first-ever promotion to the Pro League. On 20 June 2017, Ben Romdhane was appointed as Al-Hazem's manager. He was sacked on 5 April 2018 just two matches before the end of the season. At the time of his sacking, Al-Hazem sat at third, level on points with second-placed Al-Tai. Al-Hazem were eventually promoted to the Pro League under the management of Abdulwahab Al-Harbi. On 3 July 2018, Ben Romdhane was named as manager of hometown club JS Kairouan. He left the club after 3 matches and joined Najran on 3 October 2018. On 19 June 2019, Ben Romdhane was appointed as Al-Ain's manager. He managed to lead the club to their first-ever promotion to the Pro League.

On 24 September 2020, Ben Romdhane was appointed as Al-Fayha's manager following their relegation to the First Division. He managed to lead the club to promotion at the first time of asking. On 28 June 2021, Ben Romdhane was appointed Al-Wehda's manager. Ben Romdhane managed to get Al-Wehda promoted at the first time of asking. On 27 September 2022, Ben Romdhane was appointed as Al-Qadsiah's manager. On 17 April 2023, Ben Romdhane left the club by mutual consent.

On 15 February 2025, Ben Romdhane was appointed as manager of Ohod.

On 5 December 2025, Ben Romdhane was appointed as manager of Al-Zulfi.

== Managerial statistics ==
As of match played 11 April 2023

Managerial record by team and tenure
Team	Nat	From	To	Record							
Team	Nat	From	To	G	W	D	L	GF	GA	GD	Win %
Al-Watani (caretaker)	(Saudi Arabia)	21 October 2008	29 November 2008	5	1	1	3	5	8	−3	20.00
Al-Watani	(Saudi Arabia)	7 July 2009	14 November 2009	13	4	5	4	23	26	−3	30.77
Al-Adalah	(Saudi Arabia)	1 August 2011	1 December 2011	6	2	2	2	7	5	+2	33.33
Al-Najma	(Saudi Arabia)	28 June 2012	10 November 2012	9	2	1	6	7	14	−7	22.22
Al-Riyadh	(Saudi Arabia)	12 December 2012	1 May 2014	53	25	15	13	82	66	+16	47.17
Al-Batin	(Saudi Arabia)	1 September 2014	12 February 2016	53	24	10	19	86	62	+24	45.28
Al-Tai	(Saudi Arabia)	23 February 2016	1 May 2016	8	4	1	3	12	10	+2	50.00
Al-Fayha	(Saudi Arabia)	2 May 2016	10 May 2017	32	13	11	8	50	41	+9	40.63
Al-Hazem	(Saudi Arabia)	20 June 2017	5 April 2018	29	14	7	8	44	30	+14	48.28
JS Kairouan	(Tunisia)	2 July 2018	3 October 2018	3	0	2	1	1	4	−3	0.00
Najran	(Saudi Arabia)	3 October 2018	1 June 2019	32	10	12	10	37	35	+2	31.25
Al-Ain	(Saudi Arabia)	19 June 2019	22 September 2020	40	20	15	5	59	31	+28	50.00
Al-Fayha	(Saudi Arabia)	24 September 2020	1 June 2021	38	24	9	5	72	27	+45	63.16
Al-Wehda	(Saudi Arabia)	26 July 2021	1 June 2022	38	17	14	7	51	29	+22	44.74
Al-Qadsiah	(Saudi Arabia)	22 September 2022	17 April 2023	23	6	8	9	16	21	−5	26.09
Ohod	(Saudi Arabia)	15 February 2025	30 May 2025	13	3	3	7	14	20	−6	23.08
Al-Zulfi	(Saudi Arabia)	5 December 2025		0	0	0	0	0	0	+0	—
Total				395	169	116	110	566	429	+137	42.78

== Honours ==
=== Manager ===
Al-Watani

- Saudi First Division: 2006–07 (as assistant manager)

Al-Fayha

- Saudi First Division: 2016–17
- Saudi First Division runners-up: 2020–21 (Promotion to Pro League)

Al-Ain

- Saudi First Division third place: 2019–20 (Promotion to Pro League)

Al-Wehda

- Saudi First Division third place: 2021–22 (Promotion to Pro League)
