= Jorge Ferreira (football manager) =

Brazilian football manager

Personal information
- Full name: Jorge Ferreira Kuritza
- Date of birth: 21 June 1983 (age 43)
- Place of birth: Curitiba, Brazil

Team information
- Current team: Operário Ferroviário U20 (head coach)

Managerial career
- Years: Team
- 2013–2015: Paraná U17
- 2015: Paraná (assistant)
- 2016: Paraná U15
- 2017: J. Malucelli (assistant)
- 2018: Paraná U13
- 2019–2020: Paraná U19
- 2020–2021: Paraná (assistant)
- 2021: Paraná (interim)
- 2021–2022: Paraná
- 2022: Araucária U17
- 2023: Paraná U20
- 2024–: Operário Ferroviário U20

Jorge Ferreira Kuritza (born 21 June 1983) is a Brazilian football coach, currently the head coach of Operário Ferroviário's under-20 team.

== Career ==
A graduate of Physical Education at the Pontifical Catholic University of Paraná, Ferreira joined Paraná Clube in 2012, as an analyst. In the following year, he was named manager of the under-17 squad, and worked with the side until 2015, when he was named assistant manager of the main squad.

Ferreira worked with the under-15 squad during the 2016 campaign, and joined J. Malucelli for the 2017 season, as an assistant. He returned to Paraná in 2018, being initially in charge of the under-11, under-12 and under-13 squads.

Ferreira was later appointed as the youth football coordinator before being named at the helm of the under-19s in February 2019. Ahead of the 2021 season, he returned to the main squad, again as an assistant.

On 21 July 2021, Ferreira was named interim manager of the first team, after Maurílio Silva was dismissed. He returned to his previous role after the appointment of Sílvio Criciúma, but was definitely appointed manager of the side on 31 August, as Criciúma was sacked.

On 5 February 2022, Ferreira resigned.
