= Jaber Al-Ameri =

Saudi Arabian footballer (born 1986)

Jaber Al-Aameri
Personal information
- Date of birth: 18 February 1986 (age 40)
- Place of birth: Saudi Arabia
- Height: 1.76 m (5 ft 9 1/2 in)
- Position: Goalkeeper

Team information
- Current team: Najran SC
- Number: 13

Youth career
- Al-Faisaly

Senior career*
Years	Team	Apps	(Gls)
2003-2006	Ittihad FC		(0)
2006-2007	Al-Faisaly	14	(0)
2007-2015	Najran SC	27	(0)
2015-2016	Al-Shoalah		
2016-	Najran SC		
- * Club domestic league appearances and goals

Jaber Al-Ameri (Arabic: جابر العامري) (born 18 February 1986) is a Saudi Arabian professional footballer who currently plays as a goalkeeper for Najran SC.

== Club career ==
He started at Al-Ittihad then joined the Najran squad where he got the chance to show his abilities. On 6 November 2013, it was reported that Weymouth F.C. had signed a contract with him.
