= Basem Al-Sherif =

Saudi Arabian footballer

Personal information
- Full name: Basem Al-Sherif
- Date of birth: October 16, 1984 (age 42)
- Place of birth: Saudi Arabia
- Position: Left back

Youth career
- Al-Raed

Senior career*
Years	Team	Apps	(Gls)
2005–2011	Al-Raed		
2011–2012	Abha		
2012–2013	Al-Taawon		
2014–2015	Al-Feiha		
2015–2016	Al-Orobah		
2016–2018	Najran SC		
2018–2019	Al-Riyadh		
2019–2020	Al-Ansar		
- * Club domestic league appearances and goals

Basem Al-Sherif (Arabic: باسم الشريف; born October 16, 1984) is a Saudi football player who plays a left defender .
