= Nedo Xavier =

Brazilian footballer and manager

Personal information
- Full name: Valdonedo da Silva Xavier
- Date of birth: 15 October 1952 (age 74)
- Place of birth: Curitiba, Brazil
- Positions: Centre back; defensive midfielder

Senior career*
Years	Team	Apps	(Gls)
- Colorado
1975	Coritiba		
1976–1977	Marília		
1978–1979	Juventus		
1979	Palmeiras	14	(1)
1980–1981	America-RJ		
1981	Juventus		
1982	Farense	6	(0)
1982–1985	Ginásio de Alcobaça	14	(2)

Managerial career
- 1996–1997: Coritiba (youth)
- 1999: Coritiba (assistant)
- 2000: Atlético Mineiro (assistant)
- 2000: Atlético Mineiro (interim)
- 2000: Juventude-MT
- 2001: Malutrom
- 2003: Rio Branco-PR
- 2004: Prudentópolis
- 2004: Fortaleza
- 2005: Uniclinic
- 2005: Avaí
- 2006: Guarani-MG
- 2007: América Mineiro
- 2007: Americano
- 2008: Caldense
- 2008: Uberaba
- 2008–2009: Ituiutaba
- 2010: Guaratinguetá
- 2010–2011: Ituiutaba
- 2011–2012: Fortaleza
- 2012: ASA
- 2013: Itumbiara
- 2013: Boa Esporte
- 2014: São Caetano
- 2014: Boa Esporte
- 2015: Fortaleza
- 2015: CSA
- 2015: Paraná
- 2015–2016: Boa Esporte
- 2017: Boa Esporte
- 2019: ASA
- 2019–2020: Boa Esporte
- 2023: Boa Esporte
- * Club domestic league appearances and goals

Valdonedo "Nedo" da Silva Xavier (born 15 October 1952) is a Brazilian football coach and former player who played as either a central defender or a defensive midfielder.

== Career ==
In career he played for clubs Coritiba (1975), Marília (1976–1977), Juventus Paulista (1978–1979), Palmeiras (1979), America do Rio (1980–1981), He returned to Juventus Paulista (1981) and was still Farense closed his career in 1985 with Ginásio de Alcobaça.

Then he worked as an assistant coach at Coritiba and Atlético Mineiro. being that in mining club acted as coach interim, in 2001. after only commanded teams inexpressive, mainly in the interior of the state of Minas Gerais, but during these passages. has worked in large clubs as a Fortaleza, Avaí and América Mineiro. but its great highlight was having carried the Boa Esporte in Serie B. Recently Nedo command the CSA during the Campeonato Alagoano, exiting after. but in a little time he hit with the Paraná Clube, for the rest of the season.

== Managerial honours ==
Ituiutaba

- Campeonato Mineiro Módulo II: 2011
