= Mohamed Rebeiz =

Senegalese footballer (born 1985)

Personal information
- Date of birth: 11 November 1985 (age 40)
- Place of birth: Senegal
- Position: Midfielder

Senior career*
Years	Team	Apps	(Gls)
2002–2006	Difaâ Hassani El Jadidi		
2007–2008	Al-Ettifaq		(0)
2008–2011	Al-Hazem	33+	(4)
2011–2012	MA Tétouan	22	(0)
2012–2013	Al-Orouba		
2013–2014	Al-Hala		

International career
2009	Senegal	1	(0)
- * Club domestic league appearances and goals

Mohamed Rebeiz (born 11 November 1985) is a Senegalese former professional footballer who played as a midfielder.

== Early life ==
Rebeiz was born in Senegal to a Lebanese father and a Senegalese mother.

== Club career ==
Coming from Moroccan Botola side Difaâ Hassani El Jadidi, Rebeiz joined Saudi Premier League side Al-Ettifaq in summer 2007. He moved to fellow-Saudi Arabian club Al-Hazem in summer 2008; Rebeiz's contract was terminated on 5 February 2011.

Rebeiz returned to Morocco, playing for MA Tétouan in the Botola during the 2011–12 season; he moved to Oman Professional League side Al-Orouba in summer 2012. In summer 2013, Rebeiz joined Al-Hala in Bahrain, playing in the 2013–14 season.

== International career ==
On 14 October 2009, Rebeiz represented the Senegal national team in a friendly game against South Korea; he came on as a 70th-minute substitute in a 2–0 defeat.

== Honours ==
Ettifaq

- Saudi Crown Prince Cup: 2007–08
- Gulf Club Champions Cup runner-up: 2007

Moghreb Tétouan

- Botola: 2011–12
