= Igor Henrique =

Brazilian footballer (born 1991)

Personal information
- Full name: Igor Henrique Martins Machado
- Date of birth: 20 December 1991 (age 34)
- Place of birth: Castanhal, Brazil
- Height: 1.83 m (6 ft 0 in)
- Position: Midfielder

Team information
- Current team: Ferroviária
- Number: 27

Senior career*
Years	Team	Apps	(Gls)
2012	XV de Jaú	4	(1)
2013–2014	Iranduba	4	(2)
2014–2015	Barretos	19	(11)
2016–2017	Ituano	28	(5)
2017–2022	Tombense	15	(2)
2017	→ Atlético Goianiense (loan)	30	(1)
2018	→ Fortaleza (loan)	19	(0)
2019	→ Ponte Preta (loan)	8	(1)
2019–2020	→ Guarani (loan)	27	(3)
2020	→ Mirassol (loan)	13	(0)
2021	→ Inter de Limeira (loan)	11	(0)
2021–2022	→ Ituano (loan)	33	(7)
2023–2024	Água Santa	24	(0)
2023	→ Vila Nova (loan)	28	(8)
2024–2025	Vila Nova	62	(9)
2026	Atlético Goianiense	15	(1)
2026–	Ferroviária	4	(0)
- * Club domestic league appearances and goals as of 9 November 2026

Igor Henrique Martins Machado (born 20 December 1991) is a Brazilian footballer who plays as a midfielder for Ferroviária.

== Club career ==
Born in Castanhal, Pará, Henrique started his career with lower tier Esporte Clube XV de Novembro (Jaú) and subsequently played for Esporte Clube Iranduba da Amazônia and Barretos Esporte Clube. While playing with Barretos, he emerged as the top-scorer of the Paulista A3 after having scored 11 goals. On 6 March 2015, he moved to Mirassol Futebol Clube after agreeing to a two-year deal.

In 2016, Henrique moved to Ituano Futebol Clube. The following year, he moved to Tombense Futebol Clube. On 4 April 2017, Série A club Atlético Goianiense announced that he would join their club on a one year loan deal from Ituano at the end of the Paulista championship. On 16 July, he scored his first goal in a 2–1 defeat against Atlético Mineiro. He contributed with one goal in 28 matches; expressing his desire to renew his contract for the next season.

On 22 December 2017, Henrique moved to Fortaleza Esporte Clube on a year-long loan deal. On 20 December 2018, Ponte Preta announced the signing of Henrique.
