= Carlos Moraes =

Brazilian football manager

Personal information
- Full name: Carlos Eduardo de Moraes
- Date of birth: 22 September 1975 (age 51)
- Place of birth: Porto Alegre, Brazil

Team information
- Current team: Glória (head coach)

Managerial career
- Years: Team
- 1997–2008: Internacional (youth)
- 2009: Juventude U17
- 2009–2010: Juventude U20
- 2010–2011: Juventude (assistant)
- 2011: Juventude B
- 2012: Sport Recife U20
- 2013: Pelotas
- 2013: Canoas
- 2014: São Gabriel
- 2015: Glória
- 2016: Brasil de Farroupilha
- 2016–2017: Ypiranga-RS
- 2017: Brasil de Farroupilha
- 2018: Bagé
- 2019–2020: Esportivo
- 2021: São José-RS
- 2021: São Gabriel
- 2022–2023: Esportivo
- 2023: Caravaggio
- 2024–: Glória

Carlos Eduardo de Moraes (born 22 September 1975) is a Brazilian football coach, currently the head coach of Glória.

== Career ==
Born in Porto Alegre, Rio Grande do Sul, Moraes worked at Internacional's youth setup for 12 years before joining Juventude in 2009. He worked in the club's under-17, under-20, B-team and main squad, the latter as an assistant, and also won the 2011 Copa FGF. On 8 December 2011, he left Ju to join Sport Recife's under-20 team.

Moraes was named manager of Pelotas for the 2013 season, but was sacked on 18 February of that year. He took over Canoas the following day, but resigned on 25 March.

Moraes was announced as manager of São Gabriel for the ensuing campaign on 19 November 2013, later working as Glória manager for the 2015 season. He was relieved of his duties at the latter club on 19 May 2015, and agreed to a deal with Brasil de Farroupilha on 6 October.

On 21 September 2016, Moraes left Brasil to join Ypiranga, but was dismissed the following 13 February after being in the last place of the 2017 Campeonato Gaúcho. He returned to his previous side Brasil de Farroupilha in April, and later worked at Bagé in the following campaign.

On 5 November 2018, Moraes took over Esportivo for the following season. After achieving promotion in the Campeonato Gaúcho Série A2, he renewed his contract for a further year, and also won as the best countryside club in the 2020 Campeonato Gaúcho; on 12 October 2020, he announced his departure from the club.

On 4 January 2021, Moraes was appointed at the helm of Série C side São José-RS.
