= Hélio Vieira =

Brazilian footballer and manager (born 1963)

Personal information
- Full name: Hélio Fernando Xavier Vieira
- Date of birth: 3 September 1963 (age 63)
- Place of birth: Pelotas, Brazil
- Position: Centre back

Team information
- Current team: São José-RS (head coach)

Youth career
- Brasil de Pelotas

Senior career*
Years	Team	Apps	(Gls)
1980–1988	Brasil de Pelotas		
1989	Juventude		
1989	Brasil de Pelotas		
1990	Guarany de Cruz Alta		
1991–1993	Brasil de Pelotas		
1993	Guarany de Cruz Alta		
1994	Guarany de Bagé		
1994	Guarany de Cruz Alta		
1995	Brasil de Pelotas		
1995–1996	São Paulo-RS		
1997	Esportivo		

Managerial career
- 1997–1998: Brasil de Pelotas
- 1998: São José-RS
- 1999: Santa Cruz-RS
- 1999–2001: Al-Riyadh
- 2001: Caixas
- 2002: Atlético Tubarão
- 2002: Veranópolis
- 2003–2004: Santa Cruz-RS
- 2004: Farroupilha
- 2005: Santa Cruz-RS
- 2005–2006: Glória
- 2006: Esportivo
- 2008: Avenida
- 2008–2009: Al-Watani
- 2010: Avenida
- 2010: Brusque
- 2011: Brasil de Pelotas
- 2011: Brusque
- 2011: Esportivo
- 2012: Cerâmica
- 2012: Atlético Tubarão
- 2013: Avenida
- 2013: Atlético Tubarão
- 2014: Aimoré
- 2016: São Paulo-RS
- 2017: Santa Cruz-RS
- 2017: Ypiranga-RS
- 2018: Santa Cruz-RS
- 2018: Passo Fundo
- 2019: Veranópolis
- 2020: Aimoré
- 2021: São José-RS
- 2023: Guarany de Bagé
- 2024: União Frederiquense
- 2025–: São José-RS
- * Club domestic league appearances and goals

Hélio Fernando Xavier Vieira (born 3 September 1963), known as Hélio Vieira, is a Brazilian football coach and former player who played as a central defender. He is the current head coach of São José-RS.

== Playing career ==
Vieira was born in Pelotas, Rio Grande do Sul, and was a Brasil de Pelotas youth graduate. After making his first team debut at the age of 16, he would become a regular starter for the club in the following years.

Vieira subsequently represented Juventude, Guarany de Cruz Alta, Guarany de Bagé, São Paulo-RS and Esportivo, retiring with the latter in 1997 at the age of 33.

== Managerial career ==
Immediately after retiring, Vieira returned to his first club Brasil de Pelotas, being appointed manager in the place of sacked Vacaria. He left the club in the following year, and worked at São José-RS.

Vieira continued to work mainly in his native state in the following years, being in charge of Santa Cruz-RS (six times, where one of them he did not manage the club for a single match due to accepting an offer from a Saudi club), Caixas, Veranópolis (four times), Farroupilha, Glória, Esportivo (two times), Avenida (four times), Cerâmica, Aimoré (two times), São Paulo-RS, Ypiranga-RS and Passo Fundo, also with a return to Brasil de Pelotas in 2011. He also worked in Santa Catarina with Atlético Tubarão (three times) and Brusque (two times), and also worked abroad with Saudi Arabian sides Al-Riyadh and Al-Watani.

On 26 March 2021, Vieira returned to São José in the place of Carlos Moraes.
