= Roberto Fonseca (footballer) =

Brazilian football manager and former player

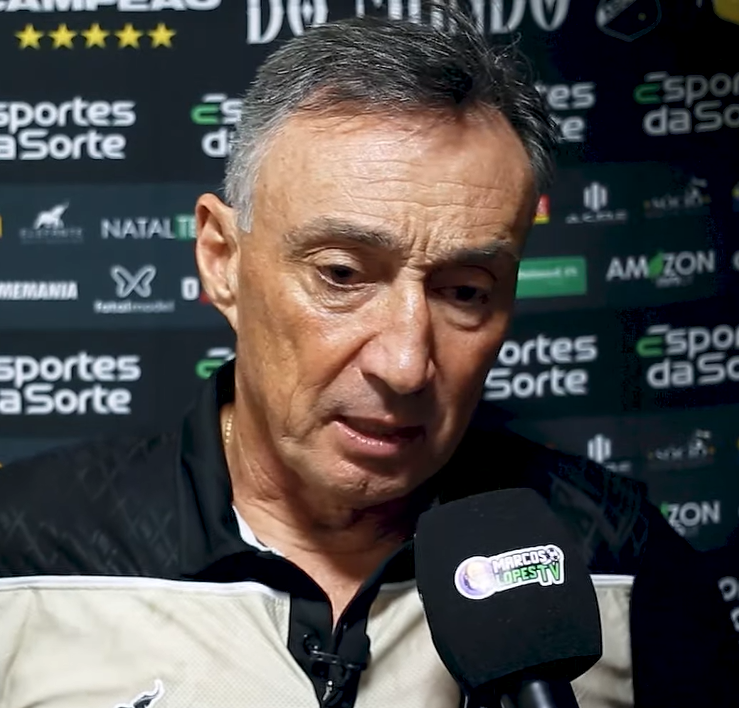
- Fonseca in 2024

Personal information
- Full name: Roberto Teixeira da Fonseca
- Date of birth: 3 June 1962 (age 64)
- Place of birth: Mandaguari, Brazil
- Position: Centre back

Team information
- Current team: Altos (head coach)

Senior career*
Years	Team	Apps	(Gls)
1981–1984	Londrina		
1985	São Paulo		
1986–1994	América-SP		
1995	Catanduvense		
1995	Botafogo-SP		
1995	Barretos		
1996	Bahia		
1996	América-SP		
1997	Sãocarlense		
1997	Ferroviária		
1998	Grêmio Maringá		
1999	Moto Club		
1999	Portuguesa Londrinense		

Managerial career
- 2003: Oeste
- 2003: Botafogo-SP
- 2004: Francana
- 2004: Barretos
- 2004: XV de Piracicaba
- 2004–2005: Mirassol
- 2005: Sertãozinho
- 2005: Bandeirante
- 2005: Londrina
- 2006: São Bento
- 2006: CENE
- 2006: ADAP
- 2006: São Raimundo-PA
- 2006–2007: Londrina
- 2007: Ituiutaba
- 2008: Guaratinguetá
- 2008–2009: Rio Branco-SP
- 2009: Oeste
- 2009: Botafogo-SP
- 2009: Criciúma
- 2009: América de Natal
- 2010: São Caetano
- 2010–2011: Guaratinguetá
- 2011: Botafogo-SP
- 2011: Caldense
- 2012: Paraná
- 2012: Itumbiara
- 2012: Ituano
- 2012: CRB
- 2013: Brasiliense
- 2013–2014: Santo André
- 2014: Linense
- 2014–2015: ABC
- 2015: São Bernardo
- 2015: Botafogo-PB
- 2016: São Bernardo
- 2016: Oeste
- 2016: Cuiabá
- 2017: Bragantino
- 2018: Caldense
- 2018: Sampaio Corrêa
- 2018: Londrina
- 2019: Novorizontino
- 2019: Londrina
- 2019: Guarani
- 2020–2021: Novorizontino
- 2021: Londrina
- 2021: Paysandu
- 2022: Ferroviário
- 2023: CSA
- 2023: Figueirense
- 2023: Londrina
- 2024: São Bento
- 2024: River
- 2024: ABC
- 2025: São Bento
- 2025: Boavista
- 2026: Itabaiana
- 2026–: Altos
- * Club domestic league appearances and goals

Roberto Teixeira da Fonseca (born 3 May 1962), known as Roberto Fonseca, is a Brazilian football coach and former player who played as a central defender. He is the current head coach of Altos.

== Career ==
Born in Mandaguari, began his professional career at Londrina in 1981. Later he played for the teams: São Paulo, América-SP, Catanduvense, Botafogo de Ribeirão Preto, Barretos, Bahia, Sãocarlense, Ferroviária, Grêmio Maringá, Moto Club and Portuguesa Londrinense, where he finished his career in 1999.

He has been working as a coach since 2003. He was Oeste. Later, managed Botafogo de Ribeirão Preto, Francana, Barretos, XV de Piracicaba, Mirassol, Sertãozinho, Bandeirante, Londrina, São Bento, CENE, ADAP, São Raimundo de Santarem, Ituiutaba, Guaratinguetá e Rio Branco de Americana.

In 2008 commanded the Oeste in campaign which led the club back to main series of Campeonato Paulista, in 2010, commanded the São Caetano was hired by Botafogo de Ribeirão Preto. returned in Guaratinguetá and Botafogo de Ribeirão Preto. in 2011 was the coach of Caldense should help and on 6 June of the same year, was announced new technician of Paraná and at the end of 2011 in commanded Itumbiara. was hired in February 2012, as trainer of Ituano and lent in the CRB returning to the command of the Ituano, in the following year. being that in June of that same year with the Brasiliense.

Roberto with the São Bernardo command team in the remainder of the Campeonato Paulista, with the difficult mission to rid the team of the downgrade, where he achieved with success the objective. months after, was Botafogo da Paraíba. On 20 July 2015, Roberto da Fonseca and his auxiliary left the command of the paraibana team in 11 games by summing the final stage of Campeonato Paraibano and Campeonato Brasileiro Série C, with utilization of 48.4% of the games. On 2 July 2015, was confirmed by the directors of São Bernardo would be the new coach of the team at Paulistão 2016. Fonseca has delivered the tiger on the downgrade the Serie A1 of state championship. On 26 February 2016, Roberto Fonseca terminates with the São Bernardo, the club is near the downgrade zone.

Hit with the in Oeste dispute of Série B, where left due to recasting of the inside of the team. but in July 2016, with the Cuiabá.

== Honours ==
=== Player ===
Londrina

- Campeonato Paranaense: 1982

São Paulo

- Campeonato Paulista: 1985

=== Manager ===
Oeste

- Campeonato Paulista Série A2: 2003

CRB

- Campeonato Alagoano: 2012

Cuiabá

- Campeonato Mato-Grossense: 2017

Sampaio Corrêa

- Copa do Nordeste: 2018
