= Pingo (footballer, born 1968) =

Brazilian football manager and former player

Personal information
- Full name: Luís Roberto Magalhães
- Date of birth: 14 February 1968 (age 58)
- Place of birth: Joinville, Brazil
- Height: 1.78 m (5 ft 10 in)
- Position: Midfielder

Senior career*
Years	Team	Apps	(Gls)
1986–1989	Joinville		
1989–1990	São José-SP		
1990–1992	Botafogo		
1993–1994	Grêmio		
1995	Cruzeiro		
1995–1996	Flamengo		
1997–1998	Botafogo		
1999	Corinthians		
1999	Paraná		
2000	Atlético Paranaense		
2000–2002	Joinville		
2002–2003	Sporting Cristal		
2004	Londrina		
2005	Marcílio Dias		
2005–2006	Atlético de Ibirama		

Managerial career
- 2010: Juventus-SC
- 2011: Caxias de Joinville
- 2012–2013: Juventus-SC
- 2013: Brusque
- 2014: Avaí
- 2014–2015: Metropolitano
- 2016–2017: Tombense
- 2017: Brusque
- 2017: Joinville
- 2018: Brusque
- 2019: Caxias
- 2019–2020: Atlético Tubarão
- 2021–2022: São José-RS
- 2022: Marcílio Dias
- 2023: Aimoré
- 2024: São José-RS
- 2025: Brasil de Pelotas
- * Club domestic league appearances and goals

Luís Roberto Magalhães (born 14 February 1968), commonly known as Pingo, is a Brazilian football coach and former player who played as a midfielder.

== Club statistics ==
Club performance			League		Cup		Continental		Total	
Season	Club	League	Apps	Goals	Apps	Goals	Apps	Goals	Apps	Goals
Brazil			League		Copa do Brasil		Libertadores		Total	
1994	Grêmio	Brasileirão	9	0	0	0	0	0	9	0
1994	Grêmio	Copa do Brasil	0	0	10	0	0	0	10	0
Total									19	0

== Honours ==
=== Player ===
Joinville

- Campeonato Catarinense: 1987, 2001

Botafogo

- Campeonato Carioca: 1990, 1997
- Torneio Rio-São Paulo: 1998

Grêmio

- Campeonato Gaúcho: 1994
- Copa do Brasil: 1994

Cruzeiro

- Copa Master de Supercopa: 1995

Flamengo

- Campeonato Carioca: 1996
- Copa de Oro: 1996

Corinthians

- Campeonato Paulista: 1999

Vitória

- Campeonato Baiano: 2000

Sporting Cristal

- Peruvian Primera División: 2002
