= Maurílio (footballer) =

Brazilian footballer and manager

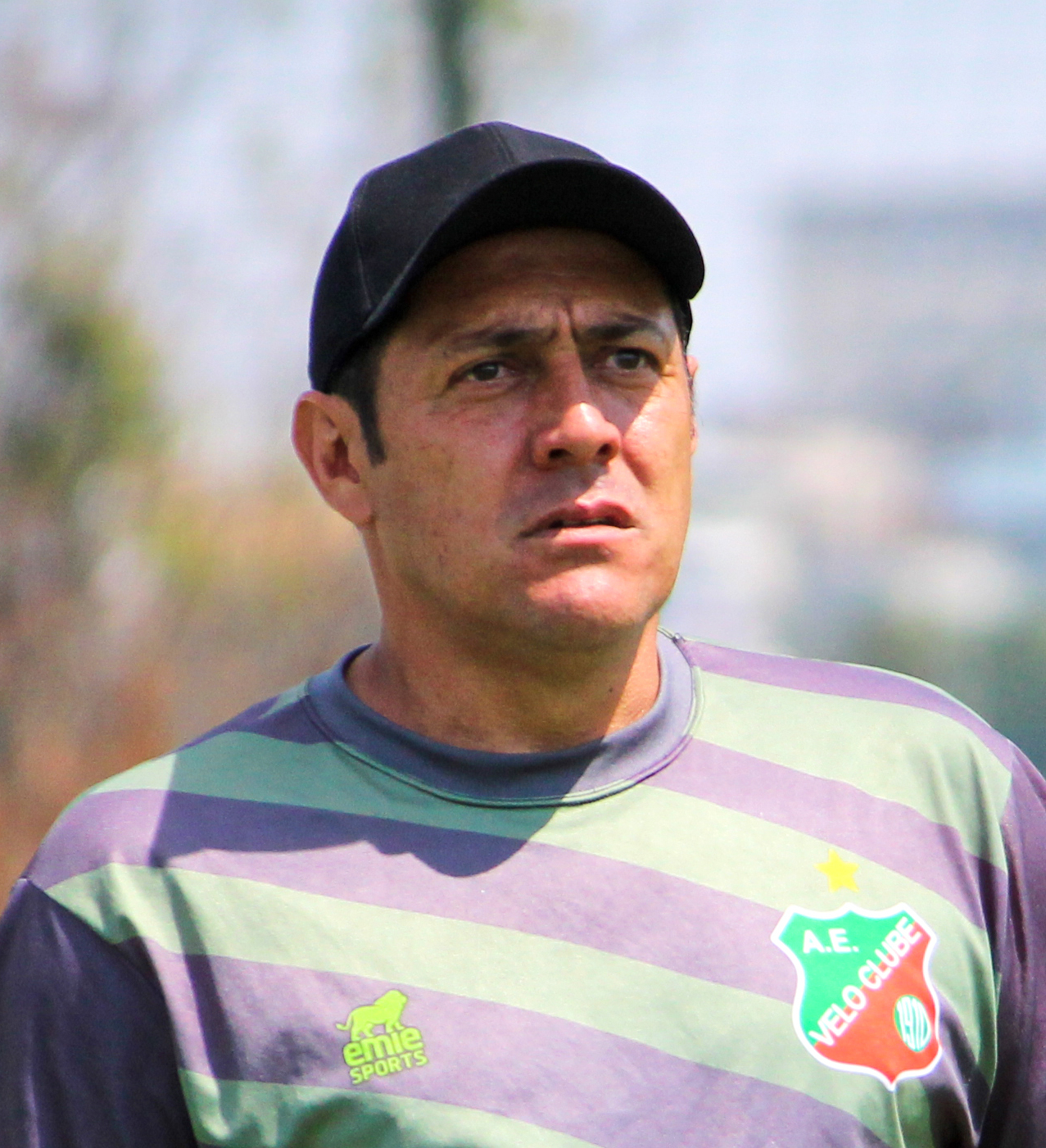
- Maurílio as head coach of Velo Clube in 2021

Personal information
- Full name: Cléverson Maurílio Silva
- Date of birth: 28 December 1969 (age 56)
- Place of birth: Brasília, Brazil
- Height: 1.78 m (5 ft 10 in)
- Position: Forward

Team information
- Current team: Lunda Sul (manager)

Youth career
- 1988–1989: Pinheiros

Senior career*
Years	Team	Apps	(Gls)
1989	Pinheiros		
1990–1992	Paraná	?	(10)
1992–2000	Palmeiras	107	(13)
1995	→ Paraná (loan)	23	(3)
1996	→ Logroñés (loan)	9	(0)
1996	→ Goiás (loan)	23	(3)
1997	→ Santa Cruz (loan)		
1997	→ Juventude (loan)	29	(6)
1998	→ Grêmio (loan)	3	(0)
1998	→ Ponte Preta (loan)	6	(1)
1998	→ Vila Nova (loan)	3	(1)
1999–2000	→ Juventude (loan)	33	(5)
2000	Vitória Guimarães	13	(2)
2001–2002	Paraná	?	(23)
2003	Al-Ittihad	?	(14)
2003	Paraná	25	(3)
2004	Paysandu	?	(4)
2004–2005	Marília		
2005	Ceará	30	(16)
2005	Remo	10	(5)
2006	Fortaleza		
2006	São Raimundo-AM	9	(2)
2007	Icasa		
2008	Horizonte		
2008	Salgueiro		
2008	Red Bull Brasil		
2009	Uniclinic	?	(6)

Managerial career
- 2010: Maranguape
- 2011: Boa Viagem
- 2012: Crateús
- 2012: Vitória-PE
- 2013: Alecrim
- 2013: Chã Grande
- 2013: Crateús
- 2014: Guarani de Juazeiro
- 2014: Tiradentes-CE
- 2014: Barbalha
- 2014: Guarany de Sobral
- 2014–2015: América-PE
- 2015: Icasa
- 2016: Uniclinic
- 2017: ASA
- 2018: Rio Branco-PR
- 2018: Ferroviário
- 2019: Treze
- 2019: Nacional de Patos
- 2019: Altos
- 2019: Juazeirense
- 2020: ASA
- 2020: Guarany de Sobral
- 2020: Itabaiana
- 2021: Paraná
- 2021: Velo Clube
- 2022: Penarol-AM
- 2022: Crateús
- 2022–: Lunda Sul
- * Club domestic league appearances and goals

Cléverson Maurílio Silva (born 28 December 1969), known as Maurílio, is a Brazilian football coach and former player who played as a forward. He is the current manager of Angolan club Lunda Sul.

== Playing career ==
Maurílio was born in Brasília, Federal District, and began his career with Pinheiros. After his club merged with Colorado to create Paraná in 1990, he moved to the new side and was regularly used before joining Palmeiras in 1992.

Maurílio left Verdão in 1995, but was still linked to the club until 2000. During that period, he represented, always on loan: Paraná, CD Logroñés, Goiás, Santa Cruz, Juventude (two stints), Grêmio, Ponte Preta and Vila Nova. In 2000, he moved to Portuguese Primeira Liga side Vitória de Guimarães, but was released by the club in December.

Maurílio then returned to Paraná for the 2001 campaign, being a regular starter before rescinding his contract in November 2002 to join Al-Ittihad. He returned to the club in June 2003, but failed to settle for a team afterwards. He played for Paysandu, Marília, Ceará, Remo, Fortaleza, São Raimundo-AM, Icasa, Horizonte, Salgueiro, Red Bull Brasil and Uniclinic, retiring with the latter in 2009 at the age of 39.

== Managerial career ==
Shortly after retiring Maurílio started working as a manager, with his first club being Maranguape in 2010. He continued to manage a number of sides in the Northeast Region, notably leading Ferroviário-CE in the 2018 Série D but leaving before the club's title.

On 4 February 2021, after managing ASA, Guarany de Sobral and Itabaiana the previous campaign, Maurílio returned to Paraná as manager for the 2021 season.

== Honours ==
=== Player ===
Paraná

- Campeonato Paranaense: 1991, 1995
- Campeonato Brasileiro Série B: 1992

Palmeiras

- Campeonato Brasileiro Série A: 1993, 1994
- Campeonato Paulista: 1994
- Torneio Rio – São Paulo: 1994

Juventude

- Copa do Brasil: 1999

Al-Ittihad

- Saudi Premier League: 2002–03

Remo

- Campeonato Brasileiro Série C: 2005

=== Manager ===
ASA

- Copa Alagoas: 2020
