= Julinho Camargo =

Brazilian football manager

Personal information
- Full name: Júlio César Valduga Camargo
- Date of birth: 12 January 1971 (age 55)
- Place of birth: Porto Alegre, Brazil

Team information
- Current team: Internacional (youth coordinator)

Managerial career
- Years: Team
- 1989–1991: Grêmio (youth)
- 1994–2000: Internacional (youth)
- 2001–2003: RS Futebol
- 2003–2004: Kuwait U20
- 2004: Brasil de Farroupilha
- 2004: Veranópolis
- 2005–2009: Grêmio (youth)
- 2009: Vitória (assistant)
- 2010: Caxias
- 2011: Novo Hamburgo
- 2011: Internacional (assistant)
- 2011: Grêmio
- 2012: Bahia (assistant)
- 2013: Veranópolis
- 2013: Ferroviário
- 2014–2015: Veranópolis
- 2015: Goiás
- 2016: Brasília
- 2016–2017: Boa Esporte
- 2018: Veranópolis
- 2018: Juventude
- 2019: Sampaio Corrêa
- 2019: Novo Hamburgo
- 2020–2021: Tombense

Júlio César Valduga Camargo (born 12 January 1971 in Porto Alegre), known as Julinho Camargo, is a Brazilian professional football manager. He is the current youth football coordinator of Internacional.

== Career ==
Julinho trained the youth teams of Grêmio (1989–1991) and Internacional (1994–2000).. He would later return to Grêmio for a four-year period from 2005 until 2009.

His first experience managing a professional team was in RS Futebol. He went on to coach Brasil de Farroupilha and Veranópolis, and worked as an assistant manager in Vitória. He coached for Caxias in Novo Hamburgo and then worked as an assistant to Falcão, in Internacional.

He returned to Grêmio to train the main team for about a month before being let go. In 2013/14 he coached for Veranópolis, Ferroviário. and back again to Veranópolis. In July 2015 he assumed command of Goiás.
