= Marcelo Martelotte =

Brazilian football manager and former player

Personal information
- Date of birth: 10 December 1968 (age 57)
- Place of birth: Rio de Janeiro, Brazil
- Height: 1.78 m (5 ft 10 in)
- Position: Goalkeeper

Youth career
- 1985–1987: Taubaté

Senior career*
Years	Team	Apps	(Gls)
1987–1988	Taubaté		
1989–1996	Bragantino		
1993	→ Santa Cruz (loan)		
1997–1998	Santos		
2000	Sport Recife		
2002	Taubaté		

International career
1989	Brazil U20		

Managerial career
- 2003: Taubaté U20
- 2004: Palmeiras U20
- 2010–2012: Santos (assistant)
- 2010–2011: Santos (caretaker)
- 2012: Ituano
- 2013: Santa Cruz
- 2013: Sport Recife
- 2013: Náutico
- 2014: Atlético Goianiense
- 2014: América de Natal
- 2015: Atlético Goianiense
- 2015–2016: Santa Cruz
- 2016: Paraná
- 2017: Santa Cruz
- 2018–2019: Taubaté
- 2020–2021: Santa Cruz
- 2021: Manaus
- 2022: Taubaté
- 2022: Santa Cruz
- 2023: Joinville
- 2023: Retrô
- 2024: Sergipe
- * Club domestic league appearances and goals

Marcelo Martelotte (born 10 December 1968) is a Brazilian professional football coach and former player who played as a goalkeeper.

== Playing career ==
Known as Marcelo in his playing days, Martelotte was born in Rio de Janeiro. A Taubaté youth graduate, he made his debut for the club in 1987. In 1989, he moved to Bragantino, being a regular starter in Vanderlei Luxemburgo's Série B and Campeonato Paulista winning campaigns.

After a short spell at Santa Cruz, Marcelo returned to Bragantino before joining Santos in 1997. A backup to Zetti at Peixe, he returned to Santa in 1999, and subsequently represented Sport Recife and his first club Taubaté, whom he retired in 2002 at the age of 34.

== Managerial career ==
Martelotte started his managerial career at his last club Taubaté, being the manager of the club's youth sides. After a short spell at Palmeiras' under-20s, he was appointed assistant of Pintado in 2005.

In 2010 Martelotte returned to Santos, being named Dorival Júnior's assistant. On 22 September 2010, after the latter's dismissal, he was appointed interim manager; he was also in charge of the club in March of the following year, as a replacement to sacked Adílson Batista.

Martelotte was named Ituano manager on 9 May 2012. He was sacked on 4 September, and was appointed at the helm of Santa Cruz in December 2012.

On 24 May 2013 Martelotte moved to Santa Cruz's fierce rival Sport, after being crowned champions of the year's Campeonato Pernambucano. Sacked on 8 September, he was subsequently in charge of Náutico, Atlético Goianiense (two stints) and América-RN before returning to Santa Cruz on 13 June 2015; with the club in the relegation zone, he ended the year with a top level promotion, finishing second and winning all of the club's last six matches.

== Honours ==
=== Player ===
Bragantino

- Campeonato Brasileiro Série B: 1989
- Campeonato Paulista: 1990

Santa Cruz

- Campeonato Pernambucano: 1993

Santos

- Torneio Rio-São Paulo: 1997
- Copa Conmebol: 1998

Sport

- Copa do Nordeste: 2000
- Campeonato Pernambucano: 2000

=== Manager ===
Santa Cruz

- Campeonato Pernambucano: 2013

Atlético Goianiense

- Campeonato Goiano: 2014
