= Sílvio Criciúma =

Brazilian football manager (born 1971)

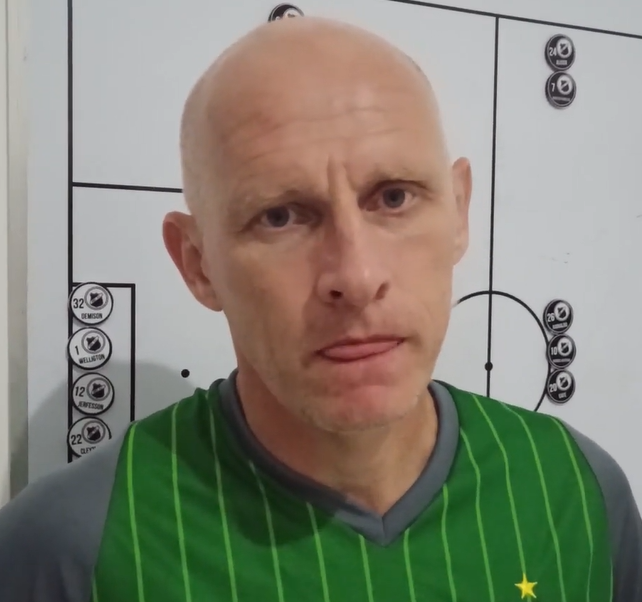
- Sílvio Criciúma in 2021

Personal information
- Full name: Sílvio Nicoladelli
- Date of birth: 7 September 1971 (age 55)
- Place of birth: Orleans, Brazil
- Height: 1.84 m (6 ft 0 in)
- Position: Defender

Team information
- Current team: Carlos Renaux (head coach)

Senior career*
Years	Team	Apps	(Gls)
1991–1995	Criciúma		
1996	Figueirense		
1996–2001	Goiás		
2001–2002	Portuguesa		
2002–2003	Atlético Paranaense		
2003	Santo André		
2003–2004	Sport Recife		
2005	Portuguesa		
2006–2008	Criciúma		

Managerial career
- 2008–2009: Criciúma (youth)
- 2011–2013: Criciúma (assistant)
- 2012: Criciúma (interim)
- 2013: Criciúma
- 2014–2015: Atlético de Ibirama
- 2015: Trindade
- 2015: Aparecidense
- 2016: Anapolina
- 2017: Goiás
- 2018: Itumbiara
- 2019: Grêmio Anápolis
- 2020: Central
- 2021: ABC
- 2021: Paraná
- 2022: Salgueiro
- 2023: Goianésia
- 2023: Juventus Jaraguá
- 2024: Morrinhos
- 2024–: Carlos Renaux
- * Club domestic league appearances and goals

Silvio Nicoladelli (born 7 September 1971 in Orleans, Santa Catarina), known as Sílvio Criciúma, is a Brazilian professional football coach and former player who played as a defender. He is the current head coach of Carlos Renaux.

== Honours ==
=== Player ===
Criciúma

- Campeonato Catarinense: 1991, 1993, 1995
- Copa do Brasil: 1991
- Campeonato Brasileiro Série C: 2006

Goiás

- Campeonato Goiano: 1998, 1999, 2000
- Campeonato Brasileiro Série B: 1999
- Copa Centro-Oeste: 2000, 2001

=== Manager ===
Goiás

- Campeonato Goiano: 2017
