= 2019 Campeonato Brasileiro Série B =

Campeonato Brasileiro Série B
- Season: 2019
- Dates: 26 April – 30 November
- Champions: Bragantino (2nd title)
- Promoted: Atlético Goianiense; Bragantino; Coritiba; Sport
- Relegated: Criciúma; Londrina; São Bento; Vila Nova
- Matches: 380
- Goals: 791 (2.08 per match)
- Top goalscorer: Guilherme (17 goals)
- Biggest home win: Bragantino 4–0 Operário Ferroviário; R16, 12 August; Cuiabá 5–1 CRB; R33, 5 November; Ponte Preta 4–0 Brasil de Pelotas; R38, 26 November
- Biggest away win: América Mineiro 0–4 Figueirense; R9, 13 July; Oeste 0–4 Atlético Goianiense; R35, 12 November
- Highest attendance: 37,220; Coritiba 2–1 Cuiabá; R5, 25 May
- Lowest attendance: 278; Oeste 0–0 Bragantino; R10, 20 July
- Total attendance: 1,932,855
- Average attendance: 5,086

The 2019 Campeonato Brasileiro Série B was a football competition held in Brazil, equivalent to the second division. The competition started on 26 April and ended on 30 November 2019.

Twenty teams competed in the tournament, twelve returning from the 2018 season, four promoted from the 2018 Campeonato Brasileiro Série C (Botafogo-SP, Bragantino, Cuiabá and Operário Ferroviário), and four relegated from the 2018 Campeonato Brasileiro Série A (América Mineiro, Paraná, Sport and Vitória).

Red Bull GmbH signed a deal with the promoted team Bragantino. Team was merged with Red Bull Brasil and renamed as RB Bragantino, although in the 2019 Série B their name was simply Bragantino with Red Bull as main sponsor.

In the 17th round (20 August), Figueirense players refused to play their away match against Cuiabá in protest over unpaid wages. Cuiabá was awarded a 3–0 win by forfeit. On 4 October, Figueirense was sanctioned by the Superior Tribunal de Justiça Desportiva (STJD) with loss of three points and a fine of R$3,000. Few days later the STJD corrected its decision and gave back the three points to Figueirense.

The top four teams were promoted to the 2020 Campeonato Brasileiro Série A. Bragantino became the first club to be promoted after a 3–1 win against Guarani on 5 November 2019. Sport was promoted on 20 November, and Coritiba and Atlético Goianiense on 30 November.

== Teams ==
Location of teams in 2019 Série B

Pos.	Relegated from 2018 Série A
17º	Sport
18º	América Mineiro
19º	Vitória
20º	Paraná

Pos.	Promoted from 2018 Série C
1º	Operário Ferroviário
2º	Cuiabá
3°	Botafogo-SP
4º	Bragantino

=== Number of teams by state ===
Number of teams	State	Team(s)
6	São Paulo	Botafogo-SP, Bragantino, Guarani, Oeste, Ponte Preta and São Bento
4	Paraná	Coritiba, Londrina, Operário Ferroviário and Paraná
2	Goiás	Atlético Goianiense and Vila Nova
2	Santa Catarina	Criciúma and Figueirense
1	Alagoas	CRB
1	Bahia	Vitória
1	Mato Grosso	Cuiabá
1	Minas Gerais	América Mineiro
1	Pernambuco	Sport
1	Rio Grande do Sul	Brasil de Pelotas

== Venues ==
Team	Home city	Stadium	Capacity
América Mineiro	Belo Horizonte	Independência	23,018
Atlético Goianiense	Goiânia	Antônio Accioly	12,000
Botafogo-SP	Ribeirão Preto	Santa Cruz	29,292
Bragantino	Bragança Paulista	Nabi Abi Chedid	17,128
Brasil de Pelotas	Pelotas	Bento Freitas	18,000
Coritiba	Curitiba	Couto Pereira	40,502
CRB	Maceió	Rei Pelé	17,126
Criciúma	Criciúma	Heriberto Hülse	19,900
Cuiabá	Cuiabá	Arena Pantanal	44,000
Figueirense	Florianópolis	Orlando Scarpelli	19,584
Guarani	Campinas	Brinco de Ouro	29,130
Londrina	Londrina	Estádio do Café	31,000
Oeste	Barueri	Arena Barueri	31,452
Oeste	Barueri	Novelli Júnior (Itu)	18,560
Operário Ferroviário	Ponta Grossa	Germano Krüger	10,632
Paraná	Curitiba	Vila Capanema	20,083
Ponte Preta	Campinas	Moisés Lucarelli	19,728
São Bento	Sorocaba	Walter Ribeiro	13,772
Sport	Recife	Ilha do Retiro	32,983
Sport	Recife	Arena Pernambuco (São Lourenço da Mata)	44,300
Vila Nova	Goiânia	Serra Dourada	42,000
Vila Nova	Goiânia	Olímpico Pedro Ludovico	13,500
Vitória	Salvador	Barradão	35,000
Vitória	Salvador	Arena Fonte Nova	50,025

== Personnel and kits ==
Team	Manager	Kit manufacturer	Main kit sponsor
América Mineiro	(Brazil) Felipe Conceição	(Brazil) SPARTA (Club manufactured kit)	
Atlético Goianiense	(Brazil) Eduardo Barroca	(Brazil) Dragão premium (Club manufactured kit)	
Botafogo-SP	(Brazil) Hemerson Maria	(Italy) Kappa	(Brazil) Sicredi
Bragantino	(Brazil) Antônio Carlos Zago	(United States) Nike	(Austria) Red Bull
Brasil de Pelotas	(Brazil) Bolívar	(Brazil) Topper	(Brazil) Banrisul
Coritiba	(Brazil) Jorginho	(Brazil) 1909 (Club manufactured kit)	(Brazil) Sementes Guerra
CRB	(Brazil) Marcelo Cabo	(Brazil) Regatas (Club manufactured kit)	
Criciúma	(Brazil) Roberto Cavalo	(Brazil) Embratex	(Brazil) Cristalcopo
Cuiabá	(Brazil) Marcelo Chamusca	(England) Umbro	(Brazil) Drebor
Figueirense	(Brazil) Pintado	(Brazil) Topper	(Brazil) Saladices
Guarani	(Brazil) Thiago Carpini (caretaker)	(Brazil) Topper	(Brazil) Magnum Relógios
Londrina	(Brazil) Silvinho	(Brazil) Karilu	(Brazil) Sicoob
Oeste	(Brazil) Renan Freitas	(Brazil) Deka Sports	(Brazil) Consigaz
Operário Ferroviário	(Brazil) Gerson Gusmão	(Brazil) Karilu	(Brazil) Sicredi
Paraná	(Brazil) Matheus Costa	(Brazil) Valente (Club manufactured kit)	
Ponte Preta	(Brazil) Gilson Kleina	(Brazil) Topper	(Brazil) Philco
São Bento	(Brazil) Marcelo Cordeiro (caretaker)	(Spain) Joma	(England) JCB
Sport	(Brazil) Guto Ferreira	(England) Umbro	(Brazil) Banco Digi+
Vila Nova	(Brazil) Itamar Schülle	(Brazil) Numer	(Brazil) CRD
Vitória	(Brazil) Geninho	(Italy) Kappa	

=== Managerial changes ===
Team	Outgoing manager	Manner of departure	Date	Position in table	Incoming manager
América Mineiro	(Brazil) Givanildo Oliveira	Sacked	1 May	19th	(Brazil) Maurício Barbieri
Vitória	(Brazil) Claudio Tencati	Sacked	19 May	17th	(Brazil) Osmar Loss
Guarani	(Brazil) Vinícius Eutrópio	Sacked	12 June	19th	(Brazil) Roberto Fonseca
Brasil de Pelotas	(Brazil) Rogério Zimmermann	Resigned	9 July	13th	(Brazil) Bolívar
Vila Nova	(Brazil) Eduardo Baptista	Sacked	13 July	16th	(Brazil) Marcelo Cabo
América Mineiro	(Brazil) Maurício Barbieri	Sacked	15 July	19th	(Brazil) Felipe Conceição
Figueirense	(Brazil) Hemerson Maria	Resigned	29 July	10th	(Brazil) Vinícius Eutrópio
Vitória	(Brazil) Osmar Loss	Sacked	4 August	19th	(Brazil) Carlos Amadeu
Criciúma	(Brazil) Gilson Kleina	Sacked	5 August	18th	(Brazil) Wilson Vaterkemper
Botafogo-SP	(Brazil) Roberto Cavalo	Resigned	6 August	4th	(Brazil) Hemerson Maria
Londrina	(Brazil) Alemão	Sacked	21 August	8th	(Brazil) Claudio Tencati
Guarani	(Brazil) Roberto Fonseca	Sacked	21 August	20th	(Brazil) Thiago Carpini
Ponte Preta	(Brazil) Jorginho	Sacked	25 August	8th	(Brazil) Gilson Kleina
Criciúma	(Brazil) Wilson Vaterkemper	Replaced	27 August	14th	(Brazil) Waguinho Dias
São Bento	(Brazil) Doriva	Sacked	29 August	18th	(Brazil) Milton Mendes
Figueirense	(Brazil) Vinícius Eutrópio	Sacked	17 September	19th	(Brazil) Márcio Coelho
Vitória	(Brazil) Carlos Amadeu	Sacked	18 September	15th	(Brazil) Geninho
Coritiba	(Brazil) Umberto Louzer	Sacked	21 September	8th	(Brazil) Jorginho
Criciúma	(Brazil) Waguinho Dias	Sacked	26 September	19th	(Brazil) Roberto Cavalo
Londrina	(Brazil) Claudio Tencati	Sacked	28 September	15th	(Brazil) Mazola Júnior
Vila Nova	(Brazil) Marcelo Cabo	Sacked	3 October	15th	(Brazil) Itamar Schülle
Cuiabá	(Brazil) Itamar Schülle	Sacked	12 October	12th	(Brazil) Marcelo Chamusca
Atlético Goianiense	(Japan) Wagner Lopes	Sacked	12 October	3rd	(Brazil) Eduardo Barroca
CRB	(Brazil) Marcelo Chamusca	Sacked	12 October	8th	(Brazil) Marcelo Cabo
Figueirense	(Brazil) Márcio Coelho	Replaced	14 October	20th	(Brazil) Pintado
São Bento	(Brazil) Milton Mendes	Resigned	2 November	20th	(Brazil) Marcelo Cordeiro
Londrina	(Brazil) Mazola Júnior	Sacked	10 November	16th	(Brazil) Silvinho

== League table ==
Pos	Team	Pld	W	D	L	GF	GA	GD	Pts	Promotion or relegation
1	Bragantino (C, P)	38	22	9	7	64	27	+37	75	Promotion to Campeonato Brasileiro Série A
2	Sport (P)	38	17	17	4	49	29	+20	68	Promotion to Campeonato Brasileiro Série A
3	Coritiba (P)	38	18	12	8	48	34	+14	66	Promotion to Campeonato Brasileiro Série A
4	Atlético Goianiense (P)	38	15	17	6	44	29	+15	62	Promotion to Campeonato Brasileiro Série A
5	América Mineiro	38	17	10	11	42	34	+8	61	
6	Paraná	38	14	14	10	34	33	+1	56	
7	CRB	38	15	10	13	44	43	+1	55	
8	Cuiabá	38	13	13	12	43	40	+3	52	
9	Botafogo-SP	38	13	11	14	38	38	0	50	
10	Operário Ferroviário	38	13	11	14	32	41	−9	50	
11	Ponte Preta	38	11	14	13	41	39	+2	47	
12	Vitória	38	11	12	15	42	48	−6	45	
13	Guarani	38	12	8	18	27	37	−10	44	
14	Brasil de Pelotas	38	11	11	16	31	47	−16	44	
15	Oeste	38	8	17	13	41	49	−8	41	
16	Figueirense	38	7	20	11	31	38	−7	41	
17	Londrina (R)	38	11	6	21	37	53	−16	39	Relegation to Campeonato Brasileiro Série C
18	São Bento (R)	38	10	9	19	46	54	−8	39	Relegation to Campeonato Brasileiro Série C
19	Criciúma (R)	38	8	15	15	30	38	−8	39	Relegation to Campeonato Brasileiro Série C
20	Vila Nova (R)	38	7	18	13	27	40	−13	39	Relegation to Campeonato Brasileiro Série C

Source: CBF
Rules for classification: 1) points; 2) wins; 3) goal difference; 4) goals scored; 5) head-to-head results (only between 2 teams. Away goals rule is used); 6) fewest red cards; 7) fewest yellow cards; 8) draw.
(C) Champions; (P) Promoted; (R) Relegated

== Results ==
Home \ Away	AME	ATL	BOT	BRA	BDP	COR	CRB	CRI	CUI	FIG	GUA	LON	OES	OPE	PAR	PON	SAO	SPO	VIL	VIT
América Mineiro	—	0–1	0–1	2–0	2–0	1–1	1–0	2–1	2–1	0–4	3–2	4–3	0–0	0–0	0–2	0–0	1–2	1–2	2–0	2–1
Atlético Goianiense	2–2	—	1–2	1–1	0–0	1–1	0–1	3–1	1–1	2–0	1–0	2–1	2–0	4–2	1–0	0–0	1–0	0–0	2–0	1–1
Botafogo-SP	0–0	0–0	—	2–3	2–3	0–1	0–2	1–0	0–0	0–0	0–0	2–1	3–2	1–1	0–1	4–1	1–0	0–2	0–1	3–1
Bragantino	2–0	3–0	0–0	—	2–1	1–1	2–0	1–1	2–2	2–0	3–1	4–1	2–2	4–0	2–0	2–1	2–0	1–1	3–1	2–0
Brasil de Pelotas	2–1	2–2	1–0	0–1	—	0–2	0–2	0–1	0–0	2–2	0–0	1–0	2–2	1–0	0–1	1–0	2–1	0–0	0–2	1–0
Coritiba	2–1	1–2	3–2	1–0	2–0	—	0–2	1–0	2–1	2–0	1–0	0–0	1–0	0–0	2–3	2–0	2–1	0–0	2–0	1–1
CRB	1–3	2–1	1–0	0–3	3–1	1–0	—	2–0	0–1	0–0	2–1	1–2	2–2	0–0	1–2	2–0	1–1	1–1	1–1	0–1
Criciúma	0–0	0–1	2–0	0–2	2–2	2–1	0–1	—	0–1	1–1	1–0	2–0	3–1	1–2	1–1	0–0	1–1	1–0	1–1	1–1
Cuiabá	0–2	0–1	2–0	2–0	1–1	3–3	5–1	0–0	—	3–0^{[1]}	2–1	0–1	2–0	2–1	1–1	1–3	3–2	1–1	1–2	1–3
Figueirense	2–1	1–0	2–1	0–3	1–0	1–1	2–2	2–2	0–0	—	0–1	1–1	1–2	1–1	0–1	0–1	2–2	1–2	0–0	1–1
Guarani	0–1	2–0	0–2	1–0	1–2	0–1	1–0	1–0	0–1	0–0	—	1–0	2–3	1–0	1–0	0–0	2–1	1–0	0–2	3–2
Londrina	0–1	1–1	1–1	1–0	1–0	2–1	0–1	1–1	1–0	0–0	2–0	—	0–2	1–2	3–0	1–3	2–4	1–2	0–1	3–1
Oeste	0–1	0–4	0–2	0–0	1–1	0–2	3–3	1–2	1–1	0–0	2–0	1–0	—	3–0	1–1	1–1	2–1	0–0	1–1	3–0
Operário Ferroviário	1–0	1–1	0–2	0–2	1–2	1–1	2–1	1–0	2–1	1–0	1–0	2–0	0–0	—	0–1	2–1	2–1	2–1	1–0	1–2
Paraná	0–0	0–0	3–3	2–1	1–0	2–0	1–0	0–0	0–0	0–1	0–0	1–0	0–0	1–0	—	1–1	2–1	0–1	1–1	0–0
Ponte Preta	0–1	0–0	0–0	1–1	4–0	1–0	0–1	1–1	3–0	1–3	1–0	3–1	3–2	1–0	4–2	—	1–1	2–2	0–1	1–2
São Bento	0–2	1–3	0–1	0–3	3–1	1–2	1–2	1–0	1–2	0–0	1–1	4–1	1–0	1–1	2–1	0–0	—	2–2	3–1	2–0
Sport	0–2	1–1	3–0	2–1	0–0	1–1	1–0	1–0	2–0	0–0	1–1	3–2	1–1	3–1	2–1	2–1	2–0	—	0–0	3–1
Vila Nova	1–1	1–1	0–2	0–1	0–2	2–2	2–2	1–1	0–0	0–0	1–1	0–1	1–1	0–0	1–1	0–0	1–0	0–2	—	0–2
Vitória	0–0	0–0	0–0	0–2	3–0	1–2	2–2	2–0	0–1	2–2	0–1	0–1	3–1	0–0	2–0	2–1	1–3	2–2	2–1	—

Source: CBF
Legend: Blue = home team win; Yellow = draw; Red = away team win.

^{1} Cuiabá awarded 3–0 win by forfeit.

== Top goalscorers ==
Rank	Player	Club	Goals
1	(Brazil) Guilherme	Sport	17
2	(Brazil) Fábio	Oeste	15
3	(Brazil) Hernane	Sport	14
3	(Brazil) Léo Ceará	CRB	14
3	(Brazil) Roger	Ponte Preta	14
3	(Brazil) Zé Roberto	São Bento	14
7	(Brazil) Rodrigão	Coritiba	13
7	(Brazil) Ytalo	Bragantino	13
9	(Brazil) Léo Gamalho	Criciúma	12
9	(Brazil) Mike	Atlético Goianiense	12

Source: CBF
