= 2020 Campeonato Brasileiro Série B =

Campeonato Brasileiro Série B
- Season: 2020
- Dates: 7 August 2020 – 29 January 2021
- Champions: Chapecoense (1st title)
- Promoted: América Mineiro; Chapecoense; Cuiabá; Juventude
- Relegated: Botafogo-SP; Figueirense; Oeste; Paraná
- Matches played: 380
- Goals scored: 824 (2.17 per match)
- Top goalscorer: Caio Dantas (17 goals)
- Biggest home win: Juventude 5–0 Paraná; R22, 20 November 2020
- Biggest away win: Ponte Preta 0–5 Chapecoense; R17, 20 October 2020; Figueirense 2–7 Ponte Preta; R38, 29 January 2021
- Highest scoring: Figueirense 2–7 Ponte Preta; R38, 29 January 2021
- Longest winning run: 5 games América Mineiro
- Longest unbeaten run: 17 games Chapecoense
- Longest winless run: 12 games Oeste
- Longest losing run: 8 games Paraná

The 2020 Campeonato Brasileiro Série B was a football competition held in Brazil, equivalent to the second division. The competition was originally scheduled to begin on 2 May and end on 28 November, however due to the COVID-19 pandemic the tournament was rescheduled for 7 August 2020–29 January 2021.

Twenty teams competed in the tournament, twelve returning from the 2019 season, four promoted from the 2019 Campeonato Brasileiro Série C (Confiança, Juventude, Náutico and Sampaio Corrêa), and four relegated from the 2019 Campeonato Brasileiro Série A (Avaí, Chapecoense, Cruzeiro and CSA). This was the first Série B played by Cruzeiro in their history.

Cruzeiro were deducted six points after their denial to pay the fee that was agreed upon with Emirati side Al Wahda over Denílson loan in 2016. Al Wahda decided to take this issue to FIFA and they won the case.

The matches Chapecoense v CSA, scheduled for 12 August 2020 (2nd round), CSA v Cuiabá, scheduled for 15 August 2020 (3rd round), Sampaio Corrêa v Figueirense, scheduled for 19 August 2020 (4th round), and Brasil de Pelotas v Sampaio Corrêa, scheduled for 23 August 2020 (5th round), were postponed after 20 CSA and 14 Sampaio Corrêa players tested positive for COVID-19.

The top four teams were promoted to the 2021 Campeonato Brasileiro Série A. América Mineiro and Chapecoense became the first two clubs to be promoted on 12 January 2021 after a 0–0 draw against Náutico and a 2–1 win against Figueirense, respectively. Cuiabá was promoted on 22 January 2021, and Juventude on 29 January 2021.

== Teams ==
Location of teams in 2020 Série B

| Pos. | Relegated from 2019 Série A |
|---|---|
| 17º | Cruzeiro |
| 18º | CSA |
| 19º | Chapecoense |
| 20º | Avaí |

| Pos. | Promoted from 2019 Série C |
|---|---|
| 1º | Náutico |
| 2º | Sampaio Corrêa |
| 3° | Juventude |
| 4º | Confiança |

=== Number of teams by state ===
| Number of teams | State | Team(s) |
|---|---|---|
| 4 | São Paulo | Botafogo-SP, Guarani, Oeste and Ponte Preta |
| 3 | Santa Catarina | Avaí, Chapecoense and Figueirense |
| 2 | Alagoas | CRB and CSA |
| 2 | Minas Gerais | América Mineiro and Cruzeiro |
| 2 | Paraná | Operário Ferroviário and Paraná |
| 2 | Rio Grande do Sul | Brasil de Pelotas and Juventude |
| 1 | Bahia | Vitória |
| 1 | Maranhão | Sampaio Corrêa |
| 1 | Mato Grosso | Cuiabá |
| 1 | Pernambuco | Náutico |
| 1 | Sergipe | Confiança |

== Venues ==
| Team | Home city | Stadium | Capacity |
|---|---|---|---|
| América Mineiro | Belo Horizonte | Independência | 23,018 |
| Avaí | Florianópolis | Ressacada | 17,826 |
| Botafogo-SP | Ribeirão Preto | Santa Cruz | 29,292 |
| Brasil de Pelotas | Pelotas | Bento Freitas | 18,000 |
| Chapecoense | Chapecó | Arena Condá | 20,089 |
| Confiança | Aracaju | Batistão | 15,586 |
| CRB | Maceió | Rei Pelé | 17,126 |
| Cruzeiro | Belo Horizonte | Mineirão | 61,846 |
| Cruzeiro | Belo Horizonte | Independência | 23,018 |
| CSA | Maceió | Rei Pelé | 17,126 |
| Cuiabá | Cuiabá | Arena Pantanal | 44,000 |
| Figueirense | Florianópolis | Orlando Scarpelli | 19,584 |
| Guarani | Campinas | Brinco de Ouro | 29,130 |
| Juventude | Caxias do Sul | Alfredo Jaconi | 19,924 |
| Náutico | Recife | Aflitos | 22,856 |
| Oeste | Barueri | Arena Barueri | 31,452 |
| Oeste | Barueri | Canindé (São Paulo) | 22,375 |
| Operário Ferroviário | Ponta Grossa | Germano Krüger | 10,632 |
| Paraná | Curitiba | Vila Capanema | 20,083 |
| Ponte Preta | Campinas | Moisés Lucarelli | 19,728 |
| Ponte Preta | Campinas | Canindé (São Paulo) | 22,375 |
| Sampaio Corrêa | São Luís | Castelão | 40,149 |
| Vitória | Salvador | Barradão | 35,000 |

== Personnel and kits ==
| Team | Manager | Kit manufacturer | Main kit sponsor |
|---|---|---|---|
| América Mineiro | (Brazil) Lisca | (Brazil) SPARTA (Club manufactured kit) | (Brazil) Banco Semear |
| Avaí | (Brazil) Claudinei Oliveira | (England) Umbro | (Malta) Estadium.bet |
| Botafogo-SP | (Brazil) Samuel Dias (caretaker) | (Italy) Kappa | Vacant |
| Brasil de Pelotas | (Brazil) Cláudio Tencati | (Brazil) Xavante (Club manufactured kit) | (Brazil) Banrisul |
| Chapecoense | (Brazil) Umberto Louzer | (England) Umbro | (Brazil) Aurora |
| Confiança | (Brazil) Daniel Paulista | (Brazil) WA Sport | (Curaçao) EsporteNet |
| CRB | (Brazil) Roberto Fernandes | (Brazil) Regatas (Club manufactured kit) | (Malta) Estadium.bet |
| Cruzeiro | (Brazil) Célio Lúcio (caretaker) | (Germany) Adidas | (Brazil) Supermercados BH |
| CSA | (Brazil) Mozart | (Brazil) Azulão (Club manufactured kit) | Vacant |
| Cuiabá | (Brazil) Allan Aal | (England) Umbro | (Brazil) Drebor |
| Figueirense | (Brazil) Jorginho Cantinflas | (Brazil) 1921 (Club manufactured kit) | (Brazil) CONCEPT |
| Guarani | (Brazil) Felipe Conceição | (Brazil) Topper | Vacant |
| Juventude | (Brazil) Pintado | (Brazil) 19treze (Club manufactured kit) | (Brazil) Banrisul |
| Náutico | (Brazil) Hélio dos Anjos | (Brazil) N Seis (Club manufactured kit) | (Malta) Estadium.bet |
| Oeste | (Brazil) Roberto Cavalo | (Brazil) Deka Sports | (Brazil) Consigaz |
| Operário Ferroviário | (Brazil) Matheus Costa | (Brazil) Karilu | (Brazil) Philco |
| Paraná | (Brazil) Márcio Coelho | (Brazil) Valente (Club manufactured kit) | (Malta) Estadium.bet |
| Ponte Preta | (Brazil) Fábio Moreno | (Brazil) 1900 (Club manufactured kit) | (Brazil) Philco |
| Sampaio Corrêa | (Brazil) Léo Condé | (Brazil) Numer | Vacant |
| Vitória | (Brazil) Rodrigo Chagas | (Italy) Kappa | (Brazil) Casa de Apostas |

=== Managerial changes ===
| Team | Outgoing manager | Manner of departure | Date | Position in table | Incoming manager |
|---|---|---|---|---|---|
| Náutico | (Brazil) Gilmar Dal Pozzo | Sacked | 12 August 2020 | 16th | (Brazil) Gilson Kleina |
| Figueirense | (Brazil) Márcio Coelho | Sacked | 27 August 2020 | 12th | (Brazil) Elano |
| Guarani | (Brazil) Thiago Carpini | Sacked | 29 August 2020 | 16th | (Brazil) Ricardo Catalá |
| CSA | (Brazil) Eduardo Baptista | Sacked | 30 August 2020 | 16th | (Brazil) Argel Fucks |
| Cruzeiro | (Brazil) Enderson Moreira | Sacked | 8 September 2020 | 16th | (Brazil) Ney Franco |
| Confiança | (Brazil) Matheus Costa | Sacked | 16 September 2020 | 16th | (Brazil) Daniel Paulista |
| CSA | (Brazil) Argel Fucks | Sacked | 17 September 2020 | 20th | (Brazil) Mozart |
| Oeste | (Brazil) Renan Freitas | Sacked | 30 September 2020 | 20th | (Brazil) Thiago Carpini |
| Ponte Preta | (Brazil) João Brigatti | Sacked | 2 October 2020 | 3rd | (Brazil) Marcelo Oliveira |
| Vitória | (Brazil) Bruno Pivetti | Sacked | 7 October 2020 | 10th | (Brazil) Eduardo Barroca |
| Guarani | (Brazil) Ricardo Catalá | Sacked | 7 October 2020 | 19th | (Brazil) Felipe Conceição |
| Cruzeiro | (Brazil) Ney Franco | Sacked | 11 October 2020 | 19th | (Brazil) Luiz Felipe Scolari |
| Oeste | (Brazil) Thiago Carpini | Sacked | 19 October 2020 | 20th | (Brazil) Roberto Cavalo |
| Operário Ferroviário | (Brazil) Gerson Gusmão | Sacked | 20 October 2020 | 10th | (Brazil) Matheus Costa |
| Brasil de Pelotas | (Brazil) Hemerson Maria | Resigned | 28 October 2020 | 15th | (Brazil) Cláudio Tencati |
| Paraná | (Brazil) Allan Aal | Sacked | 1 November 2020 | 6th | (Brazil) Rogério Micale |
| CRB | (Brazil) Marcelo Cabo | Signed by Atlético Goianiense | 7 November 2020 | 10th | (Brazil) Ramon Menezes |
| Cuiabá | (Brazil) Marcelo Chamusca | Signed by Fortaleza | 11 November 2020 | 3rd | (Brazil) Allan Aal |
| Figueirense | (Brazil) Elano | Sacked | 13 November 2020 | 18th | (Brazil) Jorginho Cantinflas |
| Náutico | (Brazil) Gilson Kleina | Sacked | 17 November 2020 | 17th | (Brazil) Hélio dos Anjos |
| Botafogo-SP | (Brazil) Claudinei Oliveira | Resigned | 20 November 2020 | 19th | (Brazil) Moacir Júnior |
| Vitória | (Brazil) Eduardo Barroca | Signed by Botafogo | 27 November 2020 | 16th | (Brazil) Mazola Júnior |
| Paraná | (Brazil) Rogério Micale | Sacked | 2 December 2020 | 15th | (Brazil) Gilmar Dal Pozzo |
| Avaí | (Brazil) Geninho | Resigned | 4 December 2020 | 7th | (Brazil) Claudinei Oliveira |
| Ponte Preta | (Brazil) Marcelo Oliveira | Sacked | 11 December 2020 | 9th | (Brazil) Fábio Moreno |
| CRB | (Brazil) Ramon Menezes | Sacked | 17 December 2020 | 15th | (Brazil) Roberto Fernandes |
| Vitória | (Brazil) Mazola Júnior | Sacked | 22 December 2020 | 15th | (Brazil) Rodrigo Chagas |
| Paraná | (Brazil) Gilmar Dal Pozzo | Resigned | 5 January 2021 | 18th | (Brazil) Márcio Coelho |
| Cruzeiro | (Brazil) Luiz Felipe Scolari | Mutual agreement | 25 January 2021 | 12th | (Brazil) Célio Lúcio (caretaker) |
| Botafogo-SP | (Brazil) Moacir Júnior | Resigned | 28 January 2021 | 19th | (Brazil) Samuel Dias (caretaker) |

=== Foreign players ===
The clubs could have a maximum of five foreign players in their Campeonato Brasileiro squads per match, but there was no limit of foreigners in the clubs' squads.

| Club | Player 1 | Player 2 | Player 3 |
|---|---|---|---|
| América Mineiro | | | |
| Avaí | (Uruguay) Gastón Rodríguez | | |
| Botafogo-SP | | | |
| Brasil de Pelotas | | | |
| Chapecoense | | | |
| Confiança | | | |
| CRB | (Argentina) Diego Torres | | |
| Cruzeiro | (Paraguay) Raúl Cáceres | (Bolivia) Marcelo Moreno^{dn} | |
| CSA | (Paraguay) Héctor Bustamante | | |
| Cuiabá | (Uruguay) Lucas Hernández | | |
| Figueirense | (Colombia) Félix Micolta | | |
| Guarani | | | |
| Juventude | (Paraguay) Nery Bareiro | | |
| Náutico | (Paraguay) Guillermo Paiva | (Bolivia) Antonio Bustamante | |
| Oeste | | | |
| Operário Ferroviário | (Uruguay) Juan Sosa | (Paraguay) Jorge Jiménez | (Uruguay) Martín Rodríguez |
| Paraná | (Colombia) Haiderson Hurtado | (Colombia) Luis Salazar | (Belarus) Renan Bressan^{dn} |
| Ponte Preta | (Senegal) Papa Faye | | |
| Sampaio Corrêa | | | |
| Vitória | (Bulgaria) Marcelinho^{dn} | (Ecuador) Jordy Caicedo | |

(dn) = Player holding Brazilian dual nationality.

== League table ==
| Pos | Team | Pld | W | D | L | GF | GA | GD | Pts | Promotion or relegation |
|---|---|---|---|---|---|---|---|---|---|---|
| 1 | Chapecoense (C, P) | 38 | 20 | 13 | 5 | 42 | 21 | +21 | 73 | Promotion to 2021 Campeonato Brasileiro Série A |
| 2 | América Mineiro (P) | 38 | 20 | 13 | 5 | 43 | 23 | +20 | 73 | Promotion to 2021 Campeonato Brasileiro Série A |
| 3 | Juventude (P) | 38 | 17 | 10 | 11 | 52 | 42 | +10 | 61 | Promotion to 2021 Campeonato Brasileiro Série A |
| 4 | Cuiabá (P) | 38 | 17 | 10 | 11 | 48 | 40 | +8 | 61 | Promotion to 2021 Campeonato Brasileiro Série A |
| 5 | CSA | 38 | 16 | 10 | 12 | 50 | 37 | +13 | 58 | |
| 6 | Sampaio Corrêa | 38 | 17 | 6 | 15 | 50 | 38 | +12 | 57 | |
| 7 | Ponte Preta | 38 | 16 | 9 | 13 | 54 | 49 | +5 | 57 | |
| 8 | Operário Ferroviário | 38 | 15 | 12 | 11 | 40 | 34 | +6 | 57 | |
| 9 | Avaí | 38 | 16 | 7 | 15 | 45 | 49 | −4 | 55 | |
| 10 | CRB | 38 | 15 | 7 | 16 | 48 | 47 | +1 | 52 | |
| 11 | Cruzeiro (Note: Cruzeiro were deducted six points after their denial to pay the fee that was agreed upon with Al Wahda over the loan of Denílson in 2016. Al Wahda decided to take this issue to FIFA and won the case.) | 38 | 14 | 13 | 11 | 39 | 32 | +7 | 49 | |
| 12 | Brasil de Pelotas | 38 | 11 | 16 | 11 | 31 | 33 | −2 | 49 | |
| 13 | Guarani | 38 | 13 | 9 | 16 | 41 | 48 | −7 | 48 | |
| 14 | Vitória | 38 | 11 | 15 | 12 | 45 | 45 | 0 | 48 | |
| 15 | Confiança | 38 | 12 | 10 | 16 | 38 | 46 | −8 | 46 | |
| 16 | Náutico | 38 | 10 | 14 | 14 | 35 | 42 | −7 | 44 | |
| 17 | Figueirense (R) | 38 | 9 | 12 | 17 | 35 | 49 | −14 | 39 | Relegation to 2021 Campeonato Brasileiro Série C |
| 18 | Paraná (R) | 38 | 9 | 10 | 19 | 34 | 50 | −16 | 37 | Relegation to 2021 Campeonato Brasileiro Série C |
| 19 | Botafogo-SP (R) | 38 | 8 | 10 | 20 | 26 | 39 | −13 | 34 | Relegation to 2021 Campeonato Brasileiro Série C |
| 20 | Oeste (R) | 38 | 7 | 8 | 23 | 28 | 60 | −32 | 29 | Relegation to 2021 Campeonato Brasileiro Série C |

Source: CBF
Rules for classification: 1) points; 2) wins; 3) goal difference; 4) goals scored; 5) head-to-head results (only between 2 teams); 6) fewest red cards; 7) fewest yellow cards; 8) draw.
(C) Champions; (P) Promoted; (R) Relegated

=== Positions by round ===
The table lists the positions of teams after each week of matches. In order to preserve chronological evolvements, any postponed matches are not included to the round at which they were originally scheduled, but added to the full round they were played immediately afterwards.

| Team ╲ Round | 1 | 2 | 3 | 4 | 5 | 6 | 7 | 8 | 9 | 10 | 11 | 12 | 13 | 14 | 15 | 16 | 17 | 18 | 19 | 20 | 21 | 22 | 23 | 24 | 25 | 26 | 27 | 28 | 29 | 30 | 31 | 32 | 33 | 34 | 35 | 36 | 37 | 38 |
|---|---|---|---|---|---|---|---|---|---|---|---|---|---|---|---|---|---|---|---|---|---|---|---|---|---|---|---|---|---|---|---|---|---|---|---|---|---|---|
| América Mineiro | 4 | 10 | 8 | 10 | 7 | 6 | 3 | 5 | 3 | 5 | 5 | 6 | 7 | 6 | 3 | 3 | 3 | 2 | 3 | 2 | 2 | 2 | 2 | 2 | 2 | 2 | 2 | 2 | 2 | 2 | 2 | 1 | 1 | 1 | 1 | 2 | 1 | 2 |
| Avaí | 2 | 6 | 10 | 12 | 14 | 12 | 10 | 11 | 12 | 13 | 12 | 10 | 10 | 9 | 7 | 7 | 9 | 11 | 9 | 9 | 7 | 6 | 6 | 7 | 8 | 9 | 10 | 7 | 7 | 7 | 9 | 9 | 7 | 6 | 8 | 6 | 6 | 9 |
| Botafogo-SP | 13 | 7 | 12 | 7 | 10 | 10 | 12 | 13 | 14 | 16 | 18 | 16 | 13 | 16 | 16 | 18 | 19 | 19 | 19 | 19 | 19 | 19 | 19 | 19 | 19 | 19 | 19 | 19 | 19 | 19 | 19 | 19 | 19 | 19 | 19 | 19 | 19 | 19 |
| Brasil de Pelotas | 12 | 11 | 14 | 15 | 17 | 17 | 13 | 12 | 11 | 11 | 11 | 11 | 11 | 14 | 13 | 14 | 14 | 15 | 15 | 13 | 13 | 14 | 14 | 13 | 13 | 14 | 15 | 12 | 13 | 11 | 10 | 10 | 12 | 10 | 11 | 12 | 11 | 12 |
| Chapecoense | 11 | 12 | 6 | 4 | 3 | 7 | 4 | 2 | 4 | 4 | 4 | 4 | 2 | 2 | 2 | 2 | 1 | 1 | 1 | 1 | 1 | 1 | 1 | 1 | 1 | 1 | 1 | 1 | 1 | 1 | 1 | 2 | 2 | 2 | 2 | 1 | 2 | 1 |
| Confiança | 7 | 15 | 18 | 18 | 18 | 18 | 14 | 15 | 16 | 12 | 13 | 14 | 12 | 11 | 11 | 10 | 6 | 8 | 11 | 12 | 11 | 11 | 10 | 9 | 9 | 7 | 9 | 10 | 11 | 12 | 13 | 11 | 14 | 14 | 13 | 14 | 14 | 15 |
| CRB | 14 | 9 | 7 | 5 | 6 | 5 | 6 | 6 | 8 | 10 | 9 | 9 | 6 | 8 | 9 | 8 | 10 | 7 | 10 | 10 | 8 | 8 | 9 | 11 | 11 | 13 | 12 | 14 | 15 | 14 | 14 | 14 | 13 | 11 | 12 | 10 | 10 | 10 |
| Cruzeiro | 20 | 18 | 9 | 11 | 11 | 14 | 16 | 16 | 13 | 15 | 17 | 15 | 17 | 18 | 19 | 19 | 18 | 18 | 16 | 15 | 15 | 15 | 15 | 16 | 15 | 11 | 11 | 11 | 10 | 10 | 12 | 13 | 11 | 13 | 14 | 13 | 12 | 11 |
| CSA | 6 | 8 | 11 | 14 | 15 | 16 | 18 | 19 | 20 | 19 | 14 | 13 | 15 | 12 | 10 | 12 | 8 | 10 | 6 | 8 | 12 | 9 | 8 | 6 | 6 | 8 | 6 | 5 | 6 | 6 | 5 | 4 | 4 | 4 | 5 | 4 | 5 | 5 |
| Cuiabá | 9 | 4 | 5 | 3 | 2 | 1 | 1 | 4 | 7 | 1 | 1 | 1 | 1 | 1 | 1 | 1 | 2 | 3 | 2 | 3 | 3 | 5 | 5 | 5 | 5 | 4 | 4 | 6 | 3 | 3 | 3 | 5 | 3 | 3 | 3 | 3 | 3 | 4 |
| Figueirense | 18 | 17 | 19 | 19 | 12 | 13 | 15 | 17 | 17 | 14 | 15 | 17 | 16 | 17 | 17 | 17 | 17 | 17 | 18 | 18 | 18 | 18 | 18 | 18 | 18 | 17 | 17 | 16 | 17 | 17 | 16 | 16 | 17 | 18 | 15 | 17 | 17 | 17 |
| Guarani | 17 | 19 | 13 | 13 | 16 | 15 | 17 | 14 | 15 | 17 | 16 | 18 | 19 | 19 | 18 | 15 | 15 | 13 | 13 | 14 | 14 | 13 | 11 | 10 | 10 | 10 | 7 | 8 | 8 | 8 | 6 | 6 | 6 | 7 | 10 | 11 | 13 | 13 |
| Juventude | 3 | 1 | 2 | 6 | 8 | 9 | 11 | 9 | 6 | 7 | 8 | 5 | 3 | 4 | 5 | 5 | 5 | 4 | 4 | 4 | 5 | 4 | 4 | 4 | 4 | 5 | 5 | 3 | 4 | 4 | 4 | 3 | 5 | 5 | 4 | 5 | 4 | 3 |
| Náutico | 19 | 16 | 17 | 16 | 13 | 11 | 9 | 10 | 10 | 9 | 10 | 12 | 14 | 13 | 15 | 16 | 16 | 16 | 17 | 17 | 17 | 17 | 17 | 17 | 17 | 18 | 18 | 18 | 18 | 18 | 17 | 17 | 15 | 15 | 16 | 15 | 16 | 16 |
| Oeste | 10 | 14 | 16 | 17 | 19 | 19 | 19 | 20 | 18 | 20 | 20 | 20 | 20 | 20 | 20 | 20 | 20 | 20 | 20 | 20 | 20 | 20 | 20 | 20 | 20 | 20 | 20 | 20 | 20 | 20 | 20 | 20 | 20 | 20 | 20 | 20 | 20 | 20 |
| Operário Ferroviário | 1 | 2 | 3 | 2 | 4 | 2 | 5 | 8 | 5 | 6 | 7 | 8 | 9 | 7 | 8 | 9 | 11 | 12 | 12 | 11 | 10 | 10 | 12 | 12 | 12 | 12 | 13 | 13 | 12 | 13 | 11 | 12 | 10 | 9 | 7 | 9 | 9 | 8 |
| Paraná | 8 | 3 | 1 | 1 | 1 | 4 | 2 | 1 | 2 | 2 | 2 | 2 | 4 | 5 | 6 | 6 | 7 | 5 | 7 | 7 | 9 | 12 | 13 | 14 | 16 | 16 | 16 | 17 | 16 | 16 | 18 | 18 | 18 | 17 | 18 | 18 | 18 | 18 |
| Ponte Preta | 16 | 13 | 15 | 9 | 5 | 3 | 7 | 3 | 1 | 3 | 3 | 3 | 5 | 3 | 4 | 4 | 4 | 6 | 5 | 6 | 6 | 7 | 7 | 8 | 7 | 6 | 8 | 9 | 9 | 9 | 7 | 7 | 8 | 8 | 6 | 8 | 8 | 7 |
| Sampaio Corrêa | 15 | 20 | 20 | 20 | 20 | 20 | 20 | 18 | 19 | 18 | 19 | 19 | 18 | 15 | 14 | 11 | 12 | 9 | 8 | 5 | 4 | 3 | 3 | 3 | 3 | 3 | 3 | 4 | 5 | 5 | 8 | 8 | 9 | 12 | 9 | 7 | 7 | 6 |
| Vitória | 5 | 5 | 4 | 8 | 9 | 8 | 8 | 7 | 9 | 8 | 6 | 7 | 8 | 10 | 12 | 13 | 13 | 14 | 14 | 16 | 16 | 16 | 16 | 15 | 14 | 15 | 14 | 15 | 14 | 15 | 15 | 15 | 16 | 16 | 17 | 16 | 15 | 14 |

| Champions, promoted to Campeonato Brasileiro Série A |
| Promotion to Campeonato Brasileiro Série A |
| Relegation to Campeonato Brasileiro Série C |

Source: CBF

== Results ==
| Home \ Away | AME | AVA | BOT | BRA | CHA | CON | CRB | CRU | CSA | CUI | FIG | GUA | JUV | NAU | OES | OPE | PAR | PON | SAM | VIT |
|---|---|---|---|---|---|---|---|---|---|---|---|---|---|---|---|---|---|---|---|---|
| América Mineiro | — | 2–1 | 1–1 | 3–1 | 2–2 | 2–1 | 1–0 | 1–2 | 2–1 | 0–1 | 0–1 | 0–0 | 2–1 | 2–0 | 2–1 | 1–1 | 1–0 | 1–1 | 2–1 | 4–0 |
| Avaí | 1–0 | — | 0–1 | 2–1 | 0–2 | 1–0 | 0–1 | 1–1 | 1–1 | 0–2 | 1–0 | 2–1 | 5–2 | 3–1 | 0–3 | 2–0 | 2–1 | 0–1 | 2–5 | 2–2 |
| Botafogo-SP | 1–2 | 0–1 | — | 0–1 | 3–0 | 2–0 | 1–2 | 0–1 | 1–3 | 1–1 | 0–1 | 0–1 | 1–1 | 1–1 | 1–1 | 0–1 | 1–0 | 2–1 | 2–1 | 2–1 |
| Brasil de Pelotas | 0–0 | 0–1 | 0–0 | — | 0–1 | 1–0 | 2–1 | 1–0 | 1–1 | 3–0 | 0–0 | 3–1 | 2–1 | 2–1 | 1–1 | 0–0 | 1–1 | 1–1 | 0–0 | 0–1 |
| Chapecoense | 0–0 | 1–0 | 1–0 | 0–0 | — | 3–1 | 3–2 | 0–1 | 0–0 | 1–0 | 2–1 | 2–0 | 1–0 | 0–0 | 0–0 | 1–0 | 2–0 | 1–0 | 1–0 | 1–1 |
| Confiança | 0–0 | 2–2 | 1–0 | 1–1 | 0–2 | — | 1–0 | 1–1 | 1–5 | 2–0 | 1–1 | 1–0 | 0–1 | 2–0 | 3–1 | 1–2 | 2–2 | 1–2 | 0–1 | 1–0 |
| CRB | 0–0 | 3–1 | 1–0 | 1–0 | 0–1 | 2–0 | — | 0–0 | 0–0 | 4–1 | 5–1 | 2–0 | 0–1 | 2–1 | 1–0 | 4–1 | 0–2 | 1–0 | 2–2 | 2–2 |
| Cruzeiro | 1–2 | 0–1 | 2–1 | 4–1 | 0–1 | 1–2 | 1–1 | — | 1–1 | 0–0 | 1–1 | 3–3 | 0–0 | 0–0 | 0–1 | 2–1 | 2–0 | 3–0 | 1–2 | 1–0 |
| CSA | 0–1 | 1–1 | 1–0 | 1–1 | 0–1 | 1–1 | 0–2 | 3–1 | — | 1–2 | 3–0 | 1–0 | 3–2 | 3–1 | 2–1 | 1–0 | 4–0 | 2–1 | 2–1 | 3–0 |
| Cuiabá | 0–0 | 2–1 | 2–0 | 0–0 | 2–1 | 1–0 | 3–0 | 1–0 | 0–1 | — | 0–0 | 4–0 | 1–0 | 1–0 | 3–0 | 2–0 | 3–3 | 2–1 | 1–3 | 3–3 |
| Figueirense | 1–2 | 2–0 | 0–0 | 3–0 | 0–0 | 0–0 | 2–0 | 0–1 | 0–0 | 1–0 | — | 2–2 | 1–1 | 2–0 | 4–1 | 0–1 | 0–1 | 2–7 | 1–2 | 0–0 |
| Guarani | 0–1 | 2–1 | 2–1 | 0–0 | 2–0 | 1–0 | 3–1 | 2–3 | 2–1 | 1–0 | 2–2 | — | 0–1 | 1–2 | 1–1 | 3–0 | 1–2 | 1–1 | 1–1 | 1–2 |
| Juventude | 0–0 | 3–0 | 0–0 | 1–2 | 1–1 | 3–1 | 2–1 | 1–0 | 1–0 | 1–1 | 2–1 | 1–0 | — | 1–0 | 2–2 | 1–0 | 5–0 | 2–1 | 2–3 | 1–1 |
| Náutico | 0–0 | 2–2 | 3–1 | 1–0 | 1–1 | 0–1 | 1–1 | 1–1 | 1–1 | 2–0 | 1–0 | 2–0 | 3–3 | — | 4–1 | 0–0 | 2–1 | 0–2 | 1–0 | 0–0 |
| Oeste | 1–1 | 0–2 | 0–1 | 2–1 | 0–0 | 0–1 | 1–2 | 0–0 | 2–1 | 0–2 | 2–1 | 0–1 | 1–3 | 0–1 | — | 0–1 | 1–0 | 1–3 | 0–3 | 2–1 |
| Operário Ferroviário | 0–1 | 1–1 | 0–0 | 2–1 | 2–0 | 1–1 | 3–2 | 0–1 | 3–0 | 1–1 | 3–1 | 1–2 | 3–0 | 3–1 | 2–0 | — | 1–0 | 1–0 | 1–1 | 1–1 |
| Paraná | 0–1 | 1–0 | 1–1 | 0–1 | 1–1 | 1–1 | 2–0 | 0–0 | 2–0 | 0–2 | 0–2 | 1–2 | 3–1 | 0–0 | 4–0 | 0–0 | — | 2–1 | 0–0 | 1–4 |
| Ponte Preta | 0–1 | 1–2 | 1–0 | 1–1 | 0–5 | 2–1 | 3–1 | 2–1 | 2–1 | 2–2 | 2–1 | 2–0 | 1–3 | 2–0 | 1–0 | 1–1 | 2–1 | — | 1–1 | 3–3 |
| Sampaio Corrêa | 1–0 | 0–1 | 2–0 | 0–1 | 1–3 | 1–3 | 3–0 | 0–1 | 1–0 | 3–0 | 3–0 | 0–1 | 0–1 | 2–1 | 1–0 | 0–1 | 2–1 | 1–2 | — | 2–1 |
| Vitória | 1–2 | 1–2 | 1–0 | 0–0 | 0–0 | 2–3 | 2–1 | 0–1 | 0–1 | 4–2 | 3–0 | 1–1 | 1–0 | 0–0 | 3–1 | 1–1 | 1–0 | 0–0 | 1–0 | — |

Source: CBF
Legend: Blue = home team win; Yellow = draw; Red = away team win.

== Top goalscorers ==
| Rank | Player | Club | Goals |
|---|---|---|---|
| 1 | (Brazil) Caio Dantas | Sampaio Corrêa | 17 |
| 2 | (Brazil) Léo Ceará | Vitória | 16 |
| 3 | (Brazil) Anselmo Ramon | Chapecoense | 10 |
| 3 | (Brazil) Paulo Sérgio | CSA | 10 |
| 3 | (Brazil) Reis | Confiança | 10 |
| 6 | (Brazil) Élton | Cuiabá | 9 |
| 6 | (Brazil) Ricardo Bueno | Operário Ferroviário | 9 |
| 8 | (Brazil) Ademir | América Mineiro | 8 |
| 8 | (Brazil) Breno Lopes | Juventude | 8 |
| 8 | (Brazil) Kieza | Náutico | 8 |
| 8 | (Brazil) Léo Gamalho | CRB | 8 |
| 8 | (Brazil) Marcinho | Sampaio Corrêa | 8 |

Source: CBF

== Awards ==
| Month | Player of the month | | Ref. |
| Month | Player | Club | Ref. |
|---|---|---|---|
| August | (Brazil) Léo Gamalho | CRB | |
| September | (Brazil) Breno Lopes | Juventude | |
October
| October | (Brazil) Caio Dantas | Sampaio Corrêa | |
| November | (Brazil) Caio Dantas | Sampaio Corrêa | |
| December | (Brazil) Ademir | América Mineiro | |
| January | (Brazil) Anselmo Ramon | Chapecoense | |
