= 2021 Campeonato Paulista =

Campeonato Paulista - Série A1
- Season: 2021
- Dates: 28 February - 23 May 2021
- Teams: 16
- Champions: São Paulo
- Relegated: São Caetano & São Bento
- Série D: Ferroviária Santo André Internacional de Limeira
- Matches: 109
- Goals: 249 (2.28 per match)
- Top goalscorer: Bruno Mezenga (9 goals)
- Biggest home win: Ferroviária 5–0 Botafogo
- Biggest away win: Inter de Limeira 0–4 São Paulo
- Highest scoring: São Paulo 5–1 São Caetano (6 goals)
- Longest winning run: São Paulo (8 games)
- Longest unbeaten run: São Paulo (10 games)
- Longest winless run: São Caetano (All games)
- Longest losing run: Ituano (7 games)
- Highest attendance: 0
- Lowest attendance: 0
- Total attendance: 0
- Average attendance: 0

The 2021 Campeonato Paulista de Futebol Profissional da Primeira Divisão - Série A1 was the 120th season of São Paulo's top professional football league. The competition was played from 28 February to 23 May 2021.

In addition, it was also decided that Paulistão 2021 will have VAR in all games, including those in the first phase of the competition.

== Format ==
- In the first stage the sixteen teams are drawn, with seeding, into four groups of four teams each, with each team playing once against the twelve clubs from the other three groups. After each team has played twelve matches, the top two teams of each group qualify for the quarter-final stage.
- After the completion of the first stage, the two clubs with the lowest number of points, regardless of the group, will be relegated to the Campeonato Paulista Série A2.
- Quarter-finals, semi-finals and finals are played in a two-legged home and away fixture, with the best placed first stage team playing the second leg at home.
- In case of a draw in any knockout stage, the match will be decided by a penalty shoot-out.
- The two highest-placed teams not otherwise qualified will qualify for the 2022 Copa do Brasil.
- The top three highest-placed teams in the general table at the end of the competition who are not playing in any level of the national Brazilian football league system will qualify for the 2022 Campeonato Brasileiro Série D.

=== Tiebreakers ===
The teams are ranked according to points (3 points for a win, 1 point for a draw, 0 points for a loss). If two or more teams are equal on points on completion of the group matches, the following criteria are applied to determine the rankings:

1. Higher number of wins;
2. Superior goal difference;
3. Higher number of goals scored;
4. Fewest red cards received;
5. Fewest yellow cards received;
6. Draw in the headquarters of the FPF.

== Teams ==
Location of teams in 2021 Campeonato Paulista

Club	Home city	Manager	2020 result
Botafogo	Ribeirão Preto	(Brazil) Argel Fucks	14th
Corinthians	São Paulo (Tatuapé)	(Brazil) Vagner Mancini	2nd
Ferroviária	Araraquara	(Brazil) Elano	11th
Guarani	Campinas	(Brazil) Allan Aal	10th
Internacional de Limeira	Limeira	(Brazil) Thiago Carpini	12th
Ituano	Itu	(Brazil) Vinícius Bergantin	13th
Mirassol	Mirassol	(Brazil) Eduardo Baptista	3rd
Novorizontino	Novo Horizonte	(Brazil) Léo Condé	9th
Palmeiras	São Paulo (Perdizes)	(Portugal) Abel Ferreira	1st
Ponte Preta	Campinas	(Brazil) Fábio Moreno	4th
Red Bull Bragantino	Bragança Paulista	(Brazil) Maurício Barbieri	5th
Santo André	Santo André	(Brazil) Paulo Roberto Santos	7th
Santos	Santos	(Brazil) Fernando Diniz	8th
São Bento	Sorocaba	(Brazil) Marcelo Cordeiro	2nd (Série A2)
São Caetano	São Caetano do Sul	(Brazil) Paulinho McLaren (interim)	1st (Série A2)
São Paulo	São Paulo (Morumbi)	(Argentina) Hernán Crespo	6th

== First stage ==
=== Group A ===
Pos	Team	Pld	W	D	L	GF	GA	GD	Pts	Qualification or relegation
1	Corinthians	12	7	4	1	17	9	+8	25	Knockout stage
2	Internacional de Limeira	12	6	0	6	8	12	−4	18	Knockout stage
3	Santo André	12	3	4	5	9	13	−4	13	Troféu do Interior
4	Botafogo	12	2	6	4	10	15	−5	12	Troféu do Interior

Source: Soccerway

=== Group B ===
Pos	Team	Pld	W	D	L	GF	GA	GD	Pts	Qualification or relegation
1	São Paulo	12	8	3	1	28	9	+19	27	Knockout stage
2	Ferroviária	12	6	3	3	20	12	+8	21	Knockout stage
3	Ponte Preta	12	4	1	7	13	16	−3	13	Troféu do Interior
4	São Bento (R)	12	1	6	5	8	14	−6	9	Relegation to Série A2

Source: Soccerway
(R) Relegated

=== Group C ===
Pos	Team	Pld	W	D	L	GF	GA	GD	Pts	Qualification or relegation
1	Red Bull Bragantino	12	6	5	1	15	7	+8	23	Knockout stage
2	Palmeiras	12	6	3	3	18	10	+8	21	Knockout stage
3	Novorizontino	12	5	4	3	17	12	+5	19	Troféu do Interior
4	Ituano	12	4	1	7	10	14	−4	13	Troféu do Interior

Source: Soccerway

=== Group D ===
Pos	Team	Pld	W	D	L	GF	GA	GD	Pts	Qualification or relegation
1	Mirassol	12	5	3	4	15	15	0	18	Knockout stage
2	Guarani	12	4	2	6	11	16	−5	14	Knockout stage
3	Santos (E)	12	3	4	5	12	19	−7	13	
4	São Caetano (R)	12	0	3	9	4	22	−18	3	Relegation to Série A2

Source: Soccerway
(E) Eliminated; (R) Relegated

== Troféu do Interior ==
The Troféu do Interior of the 2021 Campeonato Paulista began on 12 May with the quarter-finals and ended on 20 May 2021 with the final. A total of six teams compete in the Troféu Interior.

=== Round dates ===
Round	Single match
Quarter-finals	12–13 May 2021
Semi-finals	16–17 May 2021
Final	20 May 2021

=== Bracket ===
Quarterfinals
C3	Novorizontino
--
C4	Ituano	5
A4	Santo André	1
KS	Red Bull Bragantino
--
B3	Ponte Preta	0 (14)
A3	Botafogo	0 (13)

Semifinals
C3	Novorizontino	4
C4	Ituano	0
KS	Red Bull Bragantino	1 (2)
B3	Ponte Preta	1 (4)

Finals
C3	Novorizontino	2
B3	Ponte Preta	0

=== Quarter-finals ===
Team 1	Score	Team 2
Ituano	5–1	Santo André
Ponte Preta	0–0 (14–13 p)	Botafogo

12 May 2021
18:45 UTC-03:00

Ituano	5–1	Santo André
Taliari 5', 7'; Fernandinho 55'; Branquinho 35'; MateusSilva 24'	Report	Ramon 65'

Estádio Novelli Júnior, Itu
Attendance: 0
Referee: Thiago Lourenço de Mattos

Note: The match was concluded the following day, due to a power outage at the stadium.

13 May 2021
21:00 UTC-03:00

Ponte Preta	0–0	Botafogo
	Report
Penalties
Camilo (penalty scored); Dawhan (penalty scored); Renan Mota (penalty scored); Renatinho (penalty missed); Bruno Michel (penalty scored); Felipe Albuquerque (penalty scored); Ruan Renato (penalty scored); Vini Locatelli (penalty scored); Luizão (penalty scored); Apodi (penalty scored); Ygor (penalty scored); Camilo (penalty scored); Dawhan (penalty scored); Renan Mota (penalty scored); Bruno Michel (penalty scored)	14–13	(penalty scored) Neto Pessoa; (penalty missed) Renatinho; (penalty scored) Pará; (penalty scored) Martineli; (penalty scored) Rafael Marques; (penalty scored) Marlon; (penalty scored) Fabão; (penalty scored) Bruno Rafael; (penalty scored) Matheus Santos; (penalty scored) Caetano; (penalty scored) Caio Bolonhin; (penalty scored) Neto Pessoa; (penalty scored) Rafael Marques; (penalty scored) Pará; (penalty missed) Martineli

Moisés Lucarelli, Campinas
Attendance: 0
Referee: Adriano de Assis Miranda

=== Semi-finals ===
Team 1	Score	Team 2
Red Bull Bragantino	1–1 (2–4 p)	Ponte Preta
Novorizontino	4–0	Ituano

16 May 2021
18:15 UTC-03:00

Red Bull Bragantino	1–1	Ponte Preta
Chrigor 4'	Report	Paulo Sérgio 54'
Penalties
Lucas Evangelista (penalty scored); Pedrinho (penalty missed); Jan Hurtado (penalty scored); Tomás Cuello (penalty missed)	2–4	(penalty scored) Dawhan; (penalty scored) João Veras; (penalty scored) Bruno Michel; (penalty missed) Thalles; (penalty scored) Vini Locatelli

Estádio Nabi Abi Chedid, Bragança Paulista
Attendance: 0
Referee: Salim Fende Chavez

17 May 2021
20:00 UTC-03:00

Novorizontino	4–0	Ituano
Cléo Silva 8'; Jenison 45+2'; Léo Baiano 52'; Pereira 89'	Report

Estádio Dr. Jorge Ismael de Biasi, Novo Horizonte
Attendance: 0
Referee: Vinícius Gonçalves Dias Araújo

=== Final ===
Team 1	Score	Team 2
Novorizontino	2–0	Ponte Preta

20 May 2021
19:15 UTC-03:00

Novorizontino	2–0	Ponte Preta
Felipe Rodrigues 4'; Édson Silva 71'	Report

Estádio Dr. Jorge Ismael de Biasi, Novo Horizonte
Attendance: 0
Referee: Douglas Marques das Flores

2021 Troféu do Interior champions

1st title

== Knockout stage ==
The knockout stage of the 2021 Campeonato Paulista began on 11 May with the quarter-finals and end on 23 May 2021 with the final. A total of eight teams compete in the knockout stage.

=== Round dates ===
Round	First leg	Second leg
Quarter-finals	11–14 May 2021	–
Semi-finals	16 May 2021	–
Finals	20 May 2021	23 May 2021

=== Format ===
The quarter-finals will be played in a single match at the stadium of the better-ranked team in the first phase. If no goals were scored during the match, the tie will be decided via a penalty shoot-out. The semi-finals will be played with the same format as the quarter-finals. The finals will be played over two legs, with the team having the better record in matches from the previous stages hosting the second leg.

=== Qualified teams ===
Group	Winners	Runners-up
A	Corinthians	Internacional de Limeira
B	São Paulo	Ferroviária
C	Red Bull Bragantino	Palmeiras
D	Mirassol	Guarani

=== Bracket ===
Quarterfinals
B1	São Paulo	4
B2	Ferroviária	2
D1	Mirassol	0 (4)
D2	Guarani	0 (3)
A1	Corinthians	4
A2	Internacional de Limeira	1
C1	Red Bull Bragantino	0
C2	Palmeiras	1

Semifinals
B1	São Paulo	4
D1	Mirassol	0
A1	Corinthians	0
C2	Palmeiras	2

Finals
B1	São Paulo	0	2	2
C2	Palmeiras	0	0	0

=== Quarter-finals ===
Team 1	Score	Team 2
Corinthians	4−1	Internacional de Limeira
Mirassol	0–0 (4–3 p)	Guarani
Red Bull Bragantino	0–1	Palmeiras
São Paulo	4–2	Ferroviária

11 May 2021
16:00 UTC-03:00

Corinthians	4−1	Internacional de Limeira
Fagner 10'; Jemerson 58', 77'; Raul Gustavo 90+3'	Report	Thalisson Kelven 64'

Neo Química Arena, São Paulo
Attendance: 0
Referee: Douglas Marques das Flores

12 May 2021
21:00 UTC-03:00

Mirassol	0–0	Guarani
	Report
Penalties
Pedro Lucas (penalty scored); Diego Gonçalves (penalty scored); Reniê (penalty scored); Neto Moura (penalty missed); Cássio Gabriel (penalty scored)	4–3	(penalty scored) Andrigo; (penalty scored) Régis; (penalty missed) Airton; (penalty missed) Pablo; (penalty scored) Thales

Estádio Municipal José Maria de Campos Maia, Mirassol
Attendance: 0
Referee: Thiago Luis Scarascati

14 May 2021
19:30 UTC-03:00

Red Bull Bragantino	0–1	Palmeiras
	Report	Rony 78'

Estádio Nabi Abi Chedid, Bragança Paulista
Attendance: 0
Referee: Raphael Claus

14 May 2021
21:30 UTC-03:00

São Paulo	4–2	Ferroviária
Gabriel 29'; Liziero 34'; Igor Vinícius 52'; Pablo 65'	Report	Renato Cajá 43'; Bruno Mezenga 84'

Morumbi, São Paulo
Attendance: 0
Referee: Salim Fende Chavez

=== Semi-finals ===
Team 1	Score	Team 2
Corinthians	0–2	Palmeiras
São Paulo	4–0	Mirassol

16 May 2021
16:00 UTC-03:00

Corinthians	0–2	Palmeiras
	Report	Victor Luis 13'; Luiz Adriano 76'

Neo Química Arena, São Paulo
Attendance: 0
Referee: Flávio Rodrigues de Souza

16 May 2021
20:30 UTC-03:00

São Paulo	4–0	Mirassol
Robert Arboleda 45'; Danilo Boza 50' (o.g.); Gabriel 57'; Luciano 74'	Report

Morumbi, São Paulo
Attendance: 0
Referee: Luiz Flávio de Oliveira

=== Finals ===
Team 1	Agg.	Team 2	1st leg	2nd leg
São Paulo	2–0	Palmeiras	0–0	2–0

==== First leg ====
20 May 2021
22:00 UTC-03:00

Palmeiras	0–0	São Paulo
	Report

Allianz Parque, São Paulo
Attendance: 0
Referee: Flávio Rodrigues de Souza

==== Second leg ====
23 May 2021
16:00 UTC-03:00

São Paulo	2–0	Palmeiras
Luan 36'; Luciano 77'	Report

Morumbi, São Paulo
Attendance: 0
Referee: Raphael Claus

2021 Campeonato Paulista champions

23rd title

== Overall table ==
Pos	Team	Pld	W	D	L	GF	GA	GD	Pts	Qualification or relegation
1	São Paulo (C)	16	11	4	1	38	11	+27	37	Finalists
2	Palmeiras	16	8	4	4	21	12	+9	28	Finalists
3	Corinthians	14	8	4	2	21	12	+9	28	Eliminated in the semi-finals
4	Mirassol	14	5	4	5	15	19	−4	19	Eliminated in the semi-finals
5	Red Bull Bragantino	14	6	5	3	16	9	+7	23	Eliminated in the quarter-finals
6	Ferroviária (B)	13	6	3	4	22	16	+6	21	Eliminated in the quarter-finals
7	Internacional de Limeira (B)	13	6	0	7	9	16	−7	18	Eliminated in the quarter-finals
8	Guarani	13	4	3	6	11	16	−5	15	Eliminated in the quarter-finals
9	Novorizontino (W)	14	7	4	3	23	12	+11	25	
10	Ponte Preta	15	6	1	8	14	19	−5	19	
11	Ituano	14	5	1	8	15	19	−4	16	
12	Santos	12	3	4	5	12	19	−7	13	
13	Santo André (B)	13	3	4	6	10	18	−8	13	
14	Botafogo	13	2	6	5	10	15	−5	12	
15	São Bento (R)	12	1	6	5	8	14	−6	9	Relegation to Série A2
16	São Caetano (R)	12	0	3	9	4	22	−18	3	Relegation to Série A2

Updated to match(es) played on unknown. Source: Soccerway
Rules for classification: 1st points; 2nd wins; 3rd goal difference; 4th goals scored; 5th head-to-head results; 6th least red cards received; 7th least yellow cards received; 8th draw.
(B) Qualification for the Campeonato Brasileiro Série D; (C) Champions; (R) Relegated; (W) Winner of the Troféu do Interior

== Awards ==
=== Top scorers ===
Rank	Player	Club	Goals
1	(Brazil) Bruno Mezenga	Ferroviária	9
2	(Brazil) Moisés	Ponte Preta	6
3	(Brazil) Jenison	Novorizontino	4
3	(Brazil) Pablo	São Paulo	4
4	(Brazil) Danielzinho	Novorizontino	3
4	(Brazil) Diego Tavares	São Bento	3
4	(Brazil) Gabriel Sara	São Paulo	3
4	(Brazil) Andrigo	Guarani	3
