= Alemão =

Alemão, sometimes Alemao (meaning "German" in Portuguese) is a given name and surname. Notable people with the name include:

== Given name ==
- Alemão (footballer, born 1904) (1904–1975), full name Sylvio Serpa, Brazilian footballer
- Alemão (footballer, born 1961), full name Ricardo Rogério de Brito, Brazilian footballer
- Alemão (footballer, born 1975), full name Cidimar Aparecido Ernegas, Brazilian footballer
- Alemão (futsal player) (born 1976), full name Júlio César Simonato Cordeiro, Brazilian-born Spanish futsal player
- Alemão (footballer, born 1981), full name Clodoveu Almeida Mariano Júnior, Brazilian footballer
- Alemão (footballer, born February 1982), full name Paulo Jorge Sousa Vieira, Portuguese footballer
- Alemão (footballer, born November 1982), full name Everson Arantes de Oliveira, Brazilian footballer
- Alemão (footballer, born 1984) (1984–2007), full name Carlos Adriano de Jesus Soares, Brazilian footballer
- Alemão (footballer, born 1986), full name Rafael Berger, Brazilian footballer
- Alemão (footballer, born 1989), full name José Carlos Tofolo Júnior, Brazilian footballer
- Alemão (footballer, born May 1990), full name Jucimar José Teixeira, Brazilian footballer
- Alemão (footballer, born October 1990), full name Fagner Ironi Daponte, Brazilian footballer
- Alemão (footballer, born 1992), full name Guilherme António de Souza, Brazilian footballer
- Alemão (footballer, born 1998), full name Alexandre Zurawski, Brazilian footballer
- Alemão (footballer, born June 2002), full name Matheus Diogo Desevinka de Oliveira, Brazilian footballer
- Alemão (footballer, born November 2002), full name João Victor Tornich, Brazilian footballer

== Surname ==
- Aylton Alemão (born 1988), Brazilian footballer
- Churchill Alemao (born 1949), Indian politician
- Éverton Alemão (born 1993), Brazilian footballer
- Fábio Alemão (born 1996), Brazilian footballer
- Felix Alemao (born 1995), Indian cricketer
- Gilberto Alemão (born 1990), Brazilian footballer
- Gustavo Alemão (born 2000), Brazilian footballer
- Joaquim Alemao (born 1957), Indian politician
- Márcio Alemão (born 1981), Brazilian footballer
- Matheus Alemão (born 2002), Brazilian footballer
- Raphael Alemão (born 1988), Brazilian footballer
- Yuri Alemao (born 1984), Indian politician and businessman
