= Vini Locatelli =

Brazilian footballer

Personal information
- Full name: Vinícius Farias Locatelli
- Date of birth: 23 March 1998 (age 28)
- Place of birth: Campo Grande, Brazil
- Height: 1.83 m (6 ft 0 in)
- Position: Midfielder

Team information
- Current team: Amazonas
- Number: 8

Youth career
- 2015–2018: Chapecoense

Senior career*
| Years | Team | Apps | (Gls) |
| 2019–2021 | Chapecoense | 40 | (2) |
| 2021 | Ferroviária | 0 | (0) |
| 2021 | → Ponte Preta (loan) | 32 | (0) |
| 2022 | Democrata GV | 10 | (2) |
| 2022 | Floresta | 2 | (0) |
| 2023 | Athletic | 4 | (1) |
| 2023– | Amazonas | 11 | (1) |
- * Club domestic league appearances and goals as of 26 August 2023

Vinícius Farias Locatelli (born 23 March 1998), known as Vini Locatelli, is a Brazilian professional footballer who plays as a midfielder for Amazonas.

== Club career ==
=== Chapecoense ===
Born in Campo Grande, Mato Grosso do Sul, Locatelli joined Chapecoense's youth setup in 2015, aged 16. Promoted to the main squad for the 2019 campaign, he made his senior debut on 24 February of that year, coming on as a half-time substitute for Alan Ruschel in a 0–2 Campeonato Catarinense away loss against Marcílio Dias.

Locatelli scored his first goal as a professional on 31 March 2019, netting his team's second in a 2–0 home win against Brusque. He made his Série A debut on 14 September by replacing Elicarlos in a 1–2 home loss against Vasco da Gama, and scored his first goal in the category on 8 December in a 1–1 away draw against the same opponent.

On 11 March 2020, Locatelli renewed his contract with Chape until the end of 2022. During that campaign, he also helped the club to win the Catarinense and the Série B.

=== Ferroviária ===
On 7 February 2021, Locatelli agreed to a contract with Ferroviária. Chapecoense retained a percentage over a future sale.

==== Ponte Preta (loan) ====
On 22 February 2021, however, Locatelli joined Ponte Preta until the end of the year. He was a regular starter in the club's 2021 Campeonato Paulista campaign, featuring in 13 matches.

== Career statistics ==
As of 28 May 2021

| Club | Season | League | | | State League | | Cup | | Continental | | Other | | Total | |
| Club | Season | Division | Apps | Goals | Apps | Goals | Apps | Goals | Apps | Goals | Apps | Goals | Apps | Goals |
|---|---|---|---|---|---|---|---|---|---|---|---|---|---|---|
| Chapecoense | 2019 | Série A | 12 | 1 | 4 | 1 | 1 | 0 | — | | — | | 17 | 2 |
| Chapecoense | 2020 | Série B | 13 | 0 | 11 | 0 | 2 | 0 | — | | — | | 26 | 0 |
| Chapecoense | Total | | 25 | 1 | 15 | 1 | 3 | 0 | — | | — | | 43 | 2 |
| Ponte Preta | 2021 | Série B | 0 | 0 | 13 | 0 | 2 | 0 | — | | — | | 15 | 0 |
| Career total | | | 25 | 1 | 28 | 1 | 5 | 0 | 0 | 0 | 0 | 0 | 58 | 2 |

== Honours ==
Chapecoense

- Campeonato Catarinense: 2020
- Campeonato Brasileiro Série B: 2020

Democrata

- Troféu Inconfidência: 2022

Athletic Club

- Recopa Mineira: 2023

Amazonas

- Campeonato Amazonense: 2023
