= Alemão (disambiguation) =

Alemão is a Portuguese given name and surname.

Alemão may also refer to:

- Alemão (film), a 2014 Brazilian action-drama film
- Complexo do Alemão, a slum district in Rio de Janeiro, Brazil
