= Matheus Alemão =

Brazilian footballer

Personal information
- Full name: Matheus Diogo Desevinka de Oliveira
- Date of birth: 10 June 2002 (age 24)
- Place of birth: Guarapuava, Paraná, Brazil
- Height: 1.78 m (5 ft 10 in)
- Position: Forward

Team information
- Current team: Operário Ferroviário

Youth career
- Ponte Preta
- 2018–2020: Operário Ferroviário

Senior career*
Years	Team	Apps	(Gls)
2020–2023	Operário Ferroviário	18	(0)
2023	Riacho City	4	(0)
2024–	Azuriz	2	(0)
2024	→ Real Brasília (loan)	9	(2)
2024	→ Verê (loan)	6	(4)
2025	→ Laranja Mecânica (loan)	4	(0)
2025	→ Batel (loan)	0	(0)
2026–	→ Toledo (loan)	11	(0)
- * Club domestic league appearances and goals as of 16:14, 7 June 2026 (UTC)

Matheus Diogo Desevinka de Oliveira (born 10 June 2002), commonly known as Matheus Alemão, is a Brazilian footballer who plays as a forward for Toledo, on loan from Azuriz.

== Career ==
Born in Guarapuava in the Brazilian state of Paraná, Alemão began his career with Ponte Preta before joining the academy of Operário Ferroviário in 2018. Over the next two years he impressed in the youth competitions he featured in, earning a first team debut at the age of 17. After nineteen first team appearances without scoring, Alemão terminated his contract with Operário in the hope of moving to Portugal. Manager Bruno Batata would later clarify that he had agreed to be loaned to a club in Portugal with an option to buy, but after failing to reach an agreement with his agent, the deal fell through, and Alemão would instead sign for lower-division Riacho City.

== Career statistics ==
As of 7 June 2026

Appearances and goals by club, season and competition
Club	Season	League			State League		Cup (Note: Includes Copa do Brasil)		Other		Total	
Club	Season	Division	Apps	Goals	Apps	Goals	Apps	Goals	Apps	Goals	Apps	Goals
Operário Ferroviário	2020	Série B	3	0	2 (Note: Appearances in the Campeonato Paranaense)	0	0	0	0	0	5	0
Operário Ferroviário	2021	Série B	3	0	2	0	0	0	0	0	5	0
Operário Ferroviário	2022	Série B	1	0	0	0	0	0	0	0	1	0
Operário Ferroviário	2023	Série C	2	0	5	0	1	0	0	0	8	0
Operário Ferroviário	Total		9	0	9	0	1	0	0	0	19	0
Riacho City	2023	–			4 (Note: Appearances in the Campeonato Brasiliense Second Division)	0	0	0	0	0	4	0
Azuriz	2024	–			2	0	0	0	0	0	2	0
Azuriz	2025	Série D	0	0	0	0	0	0	0	0	0	0
Azuriz	2026	Série D	0	0	0	0	0	0	0	0	0	0
Azuriz	Total		0	0	2	0	0	0	0	0	2	0
Real Brasília (loan)	2024	Série D	9	2	0	0	0	0	0	0	9	2
Verê (loan)	2024	–			6 (Note: Appearances in the Campeonato Paranaense Third Division)	4	0	0	0	0	6	4
Laranja Mecânica (loan)	2025	–			4 (Note: Appearances in the Campeonato Paranaense Second Division)	0	0	0	0	0	4	0
Batel (loan)	2025	–			0	0	0	0	4 (Note: Appearances in the Taça FPF)	0	4	0
Toledo (loan)	2026	–			11	0	0	0	0	0	11	0
Career total			18	2	36	4	1	0	4	0	59	6
