= Elano =

Brazilian footballer (born 1981)

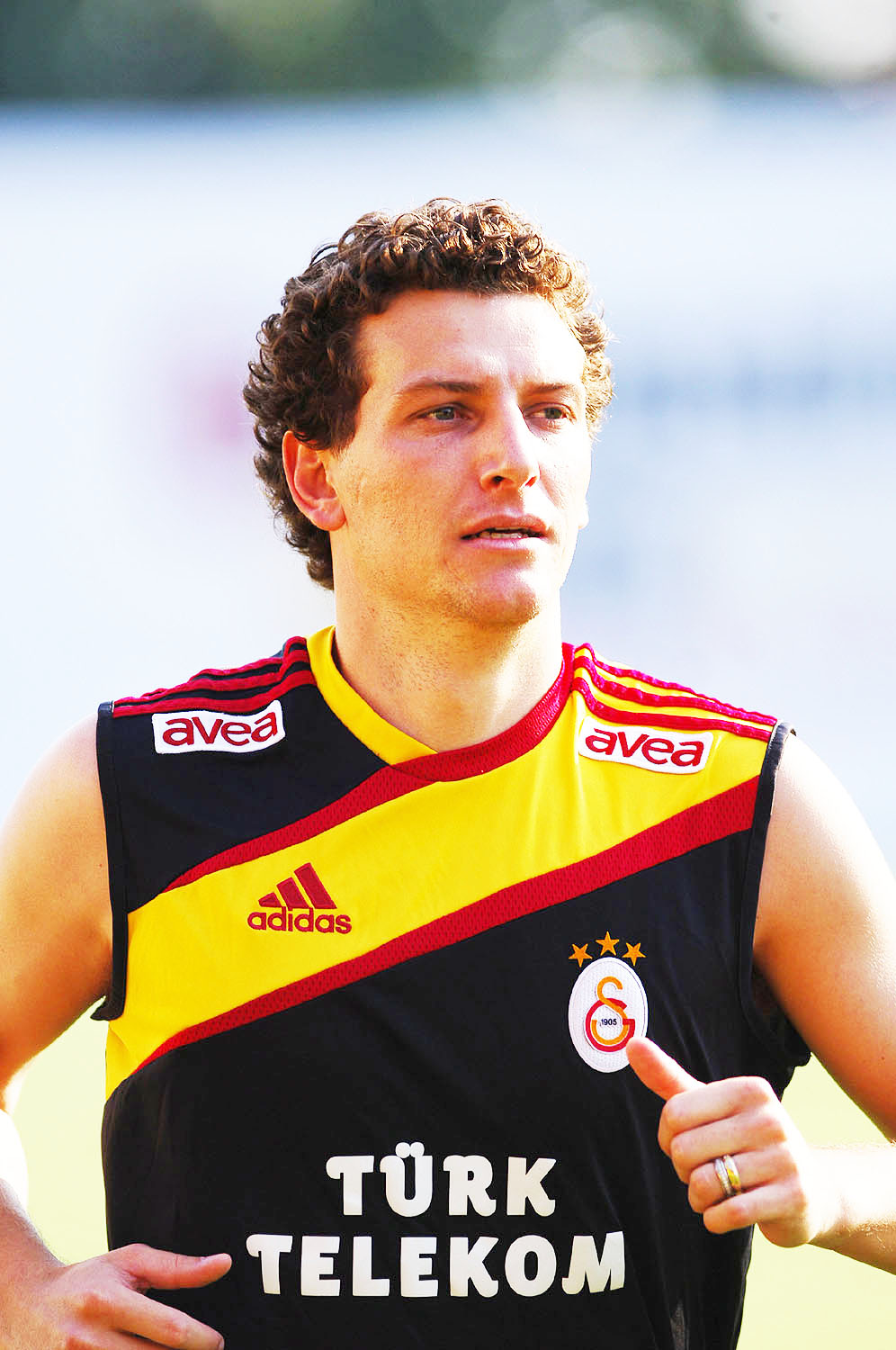
- Elano with Galatasaray in 2009

Personal information
- Full name: Elano Blumer
- Date of birth: 14 June 1981 (age 45)
- Place of birth: Iracemápolis, Brazil
- Height: 1.74 m (5 ft 9 in)
- Position: Attacking midfielder

Team information
- Current team: Santos (youth general manager)

Youth career
- 1998–2000: Guarani
- 2000: → Inter de Limeira (loan)

Senior career*
Years	Team	Apps	(Gls)
2001–2005	Santos	156	(40)
2005–2007	Shakhtar Donetsk	49	(14)
2007–2009	Manchester City	62	(14)
2009–2011	Galatasaray	32	(3)
2011–2012	Santos	50	(12)
2012–2014	Grêmio	52	(11)
2014	Flamengo	11	(5)
2014	Chennaiyin	11	(8)
2015–2016	Santos	30	(0)
2015	→ Chennaiyin (loan)	15	(4)
Total		468	(108)

International career
2004–2011	Brazil	50	(9)

Managerial career
- 2017: Santos (assistant)
- 2017: Santos (interim)
- 2017: Santos (interim)
- 2020: Inter de Limeira
- 2020: Figueirense
- 2021–2022: Ferroviária
- 2022: Náutico
- 2023: Ferroviária
- * Club domestic league appearances and goals

Elano Blumer (born 14 June 1981), known as Elano, is a Brazilian football coach and former player who played as an attacking midfielder. He is the current youth football manager of Santos.

Known for his accurate passing and precise set pieces, Elano was a technically gifted playmaking midfielder, noted for his ball control, creativity and ability to contribute goals from midfield. Elano started his senior career at Santos, and spent six years in Europe in the service of Shakhtar Donetsk, Manchester City and Galatasaray. He returned to Santos in 2011, and later joined fellow league teams Grêmio and Flamengo, before signing for Chennaiyin of the Indian Super League as their marquee player. In 2015, after finishing the season as the league's top scorer, Elano rejoined Santos for a third spell.

Elano earned 50 caps for the Brazil national team between 2004 and 2011, scoring nine goals. He represented the nation at their triumphs in the 2007 Copa América and the 2009 FIFA Confederations Cup, and also played at the 2010 FIFA World Cup and the 2011 Copa América. After retiring, he became a manager in 2020.

== Club career ==
=== Santos ===
Elano began his career with Guarani of Campinas in São Paulo state. After a short spell with Limeira's Internacional, he joined Santos in 2001. He made his senior debut for the latter on 21 January 2001, coming on as a substitute for Deivid in a 1–0 Campeonato Paulista home win against former club Guarani. His first goal for the club came on 28 April, the equalizer in a 5–1 away routing of Mogi Mirim.

Elano subsequently established himself as a starter at Peixe, and played alongside Robinho, Diego and Alex. He soon gained a reputation as a talented goalscoring midfielder, scoring a career-best 22 goals as part of the Santos side which won the Campeonato Brasileiro in 2004. Three years at Santos produced a total of 34 goals and earned the player a transfer to the Ukrainian side Shakhtar Donetsk on 1 February 2005.

=== Shakhtar Donetsk ===
Although he was not a regular in his first season in Ukraine, Elano went on to establish his credentials as a key player and exceptional form saw him become the first player from the Ukrainian Premier League to represent the Brazil national team, when he was called up for the Brazil–Norway game on 16 August 2006.

=== Manchester City ===
On 2 August 2007, Manchester City paid £8 million for Elano, who signed a four-year contract. He made his debut on the opening day of the season against West Ham United, providing the cross for the opening goal. He played in his first Manchester derby against Manchester United on 19 August 2007. Elano also revealed how he enjoyed his new life in Manchester, describing the city as beautiful, and how the weather suited him better than that which he experienced in Ukraine. He also admitted surprise at the tempo of football in the Premier League.

He was assigned with the squad number 11, previously allocated to Darius Vassell, who switched to the number 12 shirt.

On 29 September, Elano scored his first goal for City in a 3–1 win over Newcastle United. He added two more goals on eight days later in Manchester City's 3–1 win over Middlesbrough, one from open play about 25 yards out, and the other a curling free-kick from just outside the penalty area. He continued his good form by scoring the only goal in a match against Birmingham City and converting a late penalty in the League Cup victory at Bolton Wanderers. On 2 January 2008, he scored the first goal of 2008 at St James' Park in Manchester City's 2–0 victory over Newcastle. Two weeks later, in the FA Cup third round, Elano scored the winning goal as Manchester City knocked West Ham out of the competition and progressed to the fourth round. On 2 February, Elano got his fifth yellow card of the season when they played against Arsenal, a week earlier, which meant he could not play in the 2–1 victory over rivals Manchester United. Towards the end of March and beginning of April 2008, Elano scored three penalties against Birmingham City (3–1 defeat) and Sunderland (2–1 victory), as well as against Bolton in the second round of the League Cup.

His performances at the end of the 2007–08 season pleased the then manager Sven-Göran Eriksson, who claimed that the "Real Elano is Back". Elano proved himself to be highly versatile, playing in many positions for Manchester City throughout the 2007–08 season, including full-back in the 3–1 home win against Portsmouth. Elano finished the season with a goal in the 8–1 defeat at Middlesbrough on the last day of the Premier League season. His first season saw him score ten goals and as many assists in all competitions.

Elano had a fairly quiet pre-season to 2008–09, returning a bit later due to international duty. He had a good performance in the 1–0 friendly win over Milan on 9 August 2008, creating many chances with his dominant free role in midfield, and continued his good form with a successful penalty in the 4–2 loss at Aston Villa. He followed up with two goals in the 3–0 home win against West Ham, making him joint top scorer with Gabriel Agbonlahor at the end of matchday two of the Premier League. However, with the high-profile return of Shaun Wright-Phillips and the transfer of his fellow Brazilian Robinho to the club in the early part of the 2008–09 season, there was doubt as to whether he would maintain his dominant midfield position at the club. During Robinho's first match for the club, a 3–1 defeat against Chelsea, Elano was on the bench and was not called on to the pitch. He played a left-central midfield role in Mark Hughes' new look side, requiring him to act as a support between left-back Javier Garrido and forward Robinho.

He scored a goal from 25 yards out against Omonia on 2 October 2008 to help Manchester City qualify into the group stages of the UEFA Cup. After mixed performances off the bench, he continued his 100% penalty record with a goal from the spot with one in the UEFA Cup quarter-final match with Hamburger SV on 16 April 2009, another three days later in the 4–2 win over West Bromwich Albion, and then again in a 3–1 victory over Blackburn Rovers on 2 May.

=== Galatasaray ===
Elano joined Galatasaray on 30 July 2009, signing a four-year contract with the Turkish club. He was greeted at the airport by over 1,300 fans. Elano took the number 9 shirt, previously belonging to Hakan Şükür. He made his debut on 20 August 2009 in a UEFA Europa League play-off game against Estonian side Levadia Tallinn, coming on as a substitute in the 69th minute. He scored his first goal for the club on his home Süper Lig debut against Kayserispor on 23 August 2009, scoring a fantastic left-foot goal from 28 yards.

=== Return to Brazil ===
Elano rejoined former club Santos on 30 November 2010 for a €2.9 million transfer deal. Galatasaray will also receive 50% of the transfer profit (the revenue minus €2.9 million) should Santos sell him to another club on or before 31 December 2012 for higher than €2.9 million. On 19 January 2011, Santos announced that the club sold 20% economic rights for future transfer revenue to an investment group, Terceira Estrela Investimentos S/A (TEISA) for R$ 1.56 million, or 20% cost that Santos paid (R$7.8 million). It is because Santos bought Elano for €2.9 million (R$6.6 million) plus R$1.2 million tax. On his return to Brazilian football, he was top scorer of the 2011 Campeonato Paulista alongside the Corinthians striker Liédson, with 11 goals.

On 8 July 2012, it was announced that Elano would join Grêmio. After being swapped for striker Ezequiel Miralles, he signed a three-year contract with the Porto Alegre-based club.

Elano had a brief spell at Flamengo in 2014, joining the club on loan from Grêmio in January; he stayed until August, when the deal was canceled by the Rio de Janeiro-based club.

The midfielder returned to Grêmio following his departure from Flamengo, but his return did not last, as his contract was terminated by mutual consent on 22 August 2014.

=== Chennaiyin ===
On 20 September 2014, Elano signed for Chennaiyin in the Indian Super League (ISL)'s debut season. He signed for a three-month contract for US$1 million through the club's technical partner and CEO of Kshatriya Sports Prashant Agarwal. He qualified as the marquee player of the club and scored from a free kick on his debut at FC Goa, in a 2–1 victory on 15 October 2014, making him the first marquee player to score in the ISL. With two goals — a penalty and a free kick — and two assists in Chennaiyin's 5–1 win over Mumbai City on 28 October, he topped the ISL scoring chart with five goals in four games. He finished the season as the league's top scorer with eight goals, but also spent time back in Brazil for recuperation following an injury suffered against Pune City.

On 6 January 2015, it was reported that Elano was now a free agent and would be pursuing a move back to Brazil.

=== Second return to Santos ===
On 13 January 2015, Elano agreed to a short-term deal with Santos, returning to the club for a third spell. He debuted in his third spell on 1 February, coming on as a second-half substitute for Thiago Ribeiro in a 3–0 home win against Ituano. In May, he renewed his contract for a further season.

On 17 June 2015, however, Elano agreed to a loan back to former club Chennaiyin in the Indian Super League, again as their marquee player. During his second season with the team, Elano helped Chennaiyin win the ISL championship, defeating Goa 3–2 on 20 December 2015. However, following the final, Elano was involved in controversy in which he was arrested by the Goan police for allegedly assaulting Goa co-owner Dattaraj Salgaocar. Elano was released after spending the night with the Goan police before returning to Brazil the next day. Following the incident, Elano plead his innocence while video of the altercation between him and Salgaocar showed Elano trying to calm the situation down instead of trying to start a conflict. In the end, Elano was not charged by the AIFF, the Indian Super League organizers, or the Goan police. In August 2016, it was revealed that when selling his stake in FC Goa, one of the conditions of Salgaocar was that Elano would not be able to return to the Indian Super League for at least two seasons.

Returning to Peixe in January 2016, Elano appeared rarely for the club. On 24 November of that year, he announced his upcoming retirement from professional football after the expiration of his contract in December, becoming Dorival Júnior's assistant manager for the 2017 campaign.

Elano's last professional match occurred on 11 December 2016, as he came on for Lucas Lima in a 1–0 home win against América Mineiro. He ended his career with 322 matches and 68 goals only for Santos.

== International career ==
Elano was capped for Brazil in the 2004 CONMEBOL Men Pre-Olympic Tournament in January 2004. His full international debut came in October 2004, and he has since earned 50 caps, and scoring nine goals. He scored his first two international goals in the 2006 friendly 3–0 win against Argentina on 3 September at the Emirates Stadium, London.

In 2007, Elano participated in the Copa América, playing four games for Brazil, including the final against Argentina, during which he assisted a goal before being substituted out due to injury.

On 19 November 2008, Elano scored in the 6–2 victory over Portugal in a friendly. Elano scored his sixth international goal against Italy with an all set up by his former Santos and Manchester City teammate Robinho, who went on to score Brazil's second goal. Elano then set up the match-winning goal for Lúcio, completing a stunning second-half comeback in the final of the 2009 FIFA Confederations Cup against the United States, helping the Seleção win a third trophy in the competition.

On 14 November 2009, Elano made an assist in a friendly against England. Nilmar ran between two defenders to head a long pass from Elano past goalkeeper Ben Foster and score the winning goal in a 1–0 victory.

=== 2010 FIFA World Cup ===
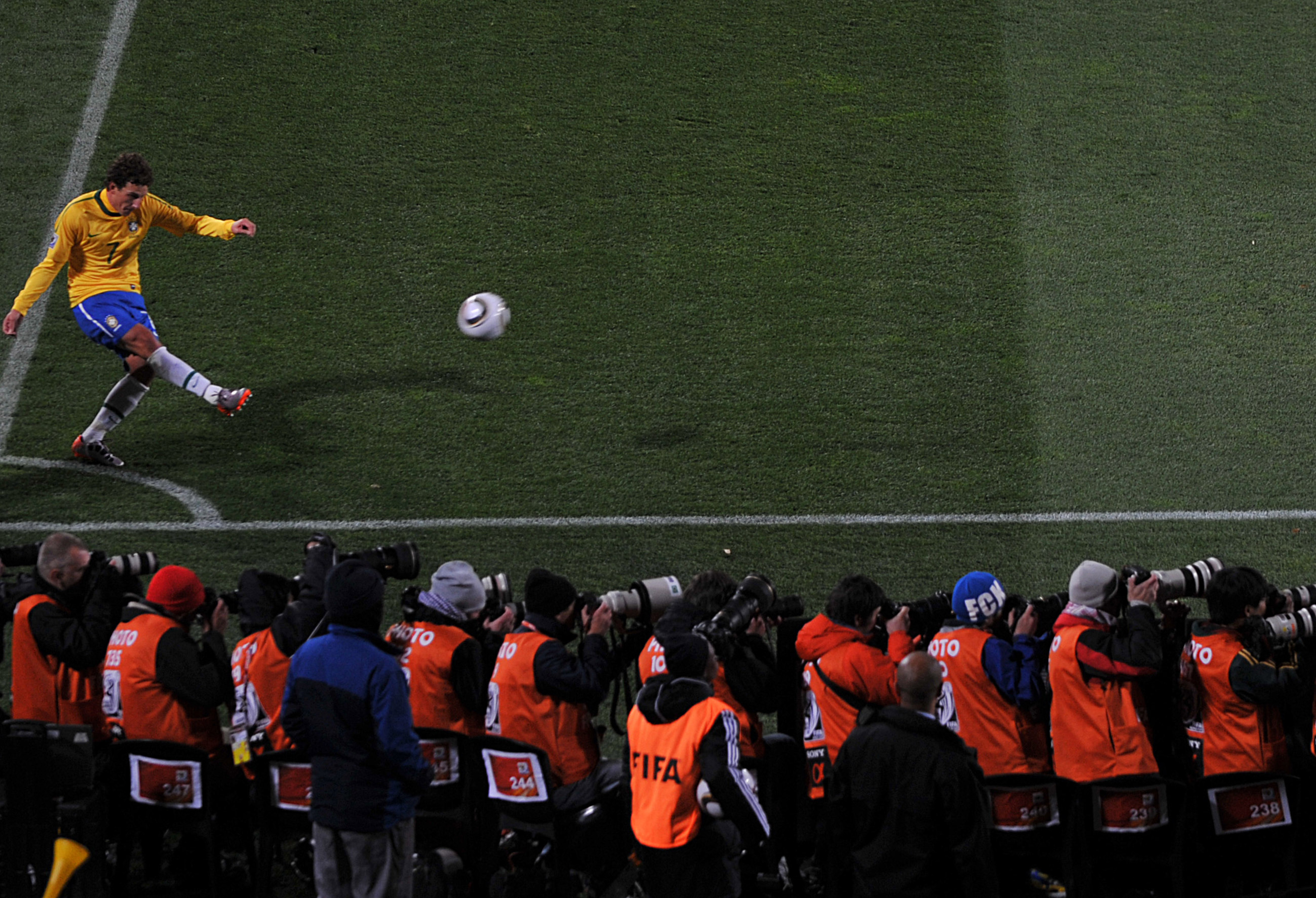
Elano taking a corner kick for Brazil at the 2010 FIFA World Cup

On 15 June 2010, Elano scored Brazil's second goal against North Korea in their first game of the 2010 FIFA World Cup in the 72nd minute. He also scored a goal against the Ivory Coast in the 62nd minute of Brazil's second game but was substituted minutes later with an injury after a very heavy challenge. He did not play for the rest of the tournament due to that injury.

=== 2011 Copa América ===
Elano was part of the Brazilian squad at the 2011 edition of Copa América in Argentina. He was called in as a substitute in two group stage matches: Brazil–Venezuela and Brazil–Paraguay.

In the quarter-final match against Paraguay, he was the first to take a shot at the penalty shootout that took place after the goalless match. Elano, along with Brazil's three subsequent penalty-takers – Thiago Silva, André Santos and Fred – failed to convert, resulting in Brazil's elimination from the tournament.

== Personal life ==
Elano is married to Alexandra, and they have two daughters. He separated from his wife for a short period of time in 2011 and had an affair with Brazilian actress Nívea Stelmann. He reconciled with his wife later that year and now is a practicing Roman Catholic.

After the 2015 Indian Super League final, Elano was arrested for allegedly physically assaulting the co-owner of FC Goa. This case was referred to the ISL disciplinary committee. The ISL took a "serious view of the unsportsmanlike behavior by the Goa franchise and alleged unsportsmanlike behavior of certain players of the teams on and off the field." Meanwhile, Chennaiyian fans showed their support for Elano and condemned the unsportsmanlike behavior of FC Goa owners.

== Post-retirement ==
=== Coaching ===
==== Santos ====
Immediately after retiring Elano remained at his last club Santos, being one of the club's permanent assistant coaches. On 4 June 2017, after head coach Dorival Júnior's dismissal, he was appointed interim head coach.

Elano's reign lasted two matches before the appointment of Levir Culpi. On 28 October 2017, after Levir's sacking, he was again named interim until the end of the year, and took the club to a final third position overall. On 31 December, however, he was himself sacked by the club.

==== Inter de Limeira ====
On 7 August 2019, Elano was announced as head coach of another of his former clubs, Inter de Limeira, for the upcoming campaign. The following 1 August, after managing to avoid relegation, he announced his departure from the club.

==== Figueirense ====
On 27 August 2020, Elano was appointed in charge of Série B side Figueirense, replacing sacked Márcio Coelho. He was himself dismissed on 13 November, after a 3–0 loss to Vitória.

==== Ferroviária ====
On 26 April 2021, Elano replaced Pintado at the helm of Ferroviária for the latter stages of the 2021 Campeonato Paulista. On 23 March 2022, he agreed to leave the club on a mutual agreement after the end of the club's participation in the 2022 Campeonato Paulista.

==== Náutico ====
On 20 July 2022, Elano was announced as head coach of Náutico in the second division. On 21 August, after just one win in six matches, he was sacked.

==== Ferroviária return ====
On 26 January 2023, Elano returned to Ferroviária, replacing sacked Vinícius Munhoz. Unable to avoid relegation from the 2023 Campeonato Paulista, he left the club on a mutual agreement on 8 June, after six winless matches in the 2023 Série D.

=== Management ===
On 1 May 2025, Elano was named technical coordinator at Guarani, another club he represented as a player. He left the club the following 27 February, and was announced back at Santos on 1 March 2026, as a general manager of the youth categories.

== Career statistics ==
=== Club ===
Appearances and goals by club, season and competition
Club	Season	League			State league (Note: Includes Campeonato Paulista, Campeonato Gaúcho, Campeonato Carioca)		National cup (Note: Includes Copa do Brasil, Ukrainian Cup, FA Cup, Turkish Cup)		League cup (Note: Includes Football League Cup)		Continental		Other		Total	
Club	Season	Division	Apps	Goals	Apps	Goals	Apps	Goals	Apps	Goals	Apps	Goals	Apps	Goals	Apps	Goals
Santos	2001	Série A	25	2	5	1	2	0	—		—		2 (Note: Appearances in Torneio Rio – São Paulo)	0	34	3
Santos	2002	Série A	29	9	2	0	—		—		—		6	0	37	9
Santos	2003	Série A	39	8	5	2	—		—		17 (Note: 12 appearances in Copa Libertadores, five appearances in Copa Sudamericana)	2	—		61	12
Santos	2004	Série A	41	15	8	2	—		—		12 (Note: Eight appearances in Copa Libertadores, four appearances in Copa Sudamericana)	5	—		61	22
Santos	2005	Série A	0	0	4	1	—		—		0	0	—		4	1
Santos	Total		134	34	22	6	4	0	—		29	7	8	0	197	47
Shakhtar Donetsk	2004–05	Vyshcha Liha	13	4	—		2	0	—		4 (Note: Appearances in UEFA Cup)	1	—		19	5
Shakhtar Donetsk	2005–06	Vyshcha Liha	25	5	—		1	0	—		10 (Note: Two appearances in UEFA Champions League, eight appearances in UEFA Cup)	4	—		36	9
Shakhtar Donetsk	2006–07	Vyshcha Liha	11	5	—		2	1	—		9 (Note: Six appearances in UEFA Champions League, three appearances in UEFA Cup)	2	—		22	8
Shakhtar Donetsk	Total		49	14	—		5	1	—		23	7	—		77	22
Manchester City	2007–08	Premier League	34	8	—		2	1	2	1	0	0	—		38	10
Manchester City	2008–09	Premier League	28	6	—		1	0	2	0	15	2	—		46	8
Manchester City	Total		62	14	—		3	1	4	1	15	2	—		84	18
Galatasaray	2009–10	Süper Lig	24	3	—		5	1	—		9 (Note: Appearances in UEFA Europa League)	3	—		38	7
Galatasaray	2010–11	Süper Lig	8	0	—		1	1	—		0	0	0	0	9	1
Galatasaray	Total		32	3	—		6	2	—		9	3	0	0	47	8
Santos	2011	Série A	12	1	17	11	—		—		12 (Note: Appearances in Copa Libertadores)	3	2 (Note: Appearances in FIFA Club World Cup)	0	43	15
Santos	2012	Série A	3	0	18	0	—		—		11	2	—		32	2
Santos	Total		15	1	35	11	—		—		23	5	2	0	75	17
Grêmio	2012	Série A	25	7	—		—		—		5 (Note: Appearances in Copa Sudamericana)	1	—		30	8
Grêmio	2013	Série A	22	3	5	1	0	0	—		8	2	—		35	6
Grêmio	Total		47	10	5	1	0	0	—		13	3	—		65	14
Flamengo (loan)	2014	Série A	4	0	7	2	—		—		4	1	—		15	3
Chennaiyin	2014	Indian Super League	11	8	—		—		—		—		—		11	8
Chennaiyin	2015	Indian Super League	15	4	—		—		—		—		—		15	4
Chennaiyin	Total		26	12	—		—		—		—		—		26	12
Santos	2015	Série A	5	0	14	0	5	2	—		—		—		24	2
Santos	2016	Série A	7	0	4	0	3	0	—		0	0	—		14	0
Santos	Total		12	0	18	0	8	2	—		0	0	—		38	2
Career total			381	88	87	20	26	6	4	1	116	28	10	0	624	143

=== International ===
Appearances and goals by national team and year
National team	Year	Apps	Goals
Brazil	2004	1	0
Brazil	2005	1	0
Brazil	2006	5	2
Brazil	2007	13	2
Brazil	2008	7	1
Brazil	2009	14	1
Brazil	2010	4	3
Brazil	2011	5	0
Total		50	9

Scores and results list Brazil's goal tally first, score column indicates score after each Elano goal.

List of international goals scored by Elano
No.	Date	Venue	Opponent	Score	Result	Competition
1	3 September 2006	Emirates Stadium, London, England	Argentina	1–0	3–0	Friendly
2	3 September 2006	Emirates Stadium, London, England	Argentina	2–0	3–0	Friendly
3	9 September 2007	Soldier Field, Chicago, United States	United States	4–2	4–2	Friendly
4	17 October 2007	Maracanã Stadium, Rio de Janeiro, Brazil	Ecuador	5–0	5–0	2010 FIFA World Cup qualification
5	19 November 2008	Bezerrão, Distrito Federal, Brazil	Portugal	5–2	6–2	Friendly
6	10 February 2009	Emirates Stadium, London, England	Italy	1–0	2–0	Friendly
7	2 June 2010	National Sports Stadium, Harare, Zimbabwe	Zimbabwe	3–0	3–0	Friendly
8	15 June 2010	Ellis Park Stadium, Johannesburg, South Africa	North Korea	2–0	2–1	2010 FIFA World Cup
9	20 June 2010	Soccer City, Johannesburg, South Africa	Ivory Coast	3–0	3–1	2010 FIFA World Cup

== Managerial statistics ==
As of 22 August 2022

Managerial record by team and tenure
Team	From	To	Record								Ref
Team	From	To	G	W	D	L	GF	GA	GD	Win %	Ref
Santos (interim)	4 June 2017	11 June 2017	2	2	0	0	3	0	+3	100.00	
Santos (interim)	28 October 2017	31 December 2017	7	3	1	3	9	10	−1	42.86	
Inter de Limeira	1 January 2020	1 August 2020	14	5	2	7	11	17	−6	35.71	
Figueirense	27 August 2020	13 November 2020	17	3	6	8	11	19	−8	17.65	
Ferroviária	26 April 2021	25 March 2022	39	18	15	6	54	31	+23	46.15	
Náutico	20 July 2022	21 August 2022	6	1	0	5	4	10	−6	16.67	
Ferroviária	26 January 2023	8 June 2023	14	1	8	5	9	15	−6	7.14	
Total			99	33	32	34	101	102	−1	33.33	—

== Honours ==
Santos

- Série A: 2002, 2004
- Copa Libertadores: 2011
- Campeonato Paulista: 2011, 2012, 2015, 2016

Shakhtar Donetsk

- Ukrainian Premier League: 2004–05, 2005–06
- Ukrainian Super Cup: 2005

Flamengo

- Campeonato Carioca: 2014

Chennaiyin

- Indian Super League: 2015

Brazil

- Copa América: 2007
- FIFA Confederations Cup: 2009
- Lunar New Year Cup: 2005

Individual

- South American Team of the Year: 2003, 2004
- Campeonato Paulista Golden Boot of the Year: 2011
- Campeonato Paulista XI: 2011
- Indian Super League Golden Boot: 2014
