= Renan Freitas =

Brazilian football manager

Personal information
- Full name: Renan Roberto de Freitas
- Date of birth: 1 September 1984 (age 42)
- Place of birth: São Paulo, Brazil

Managerial career
- Years: Team
- 2012–2015: Oeste (assistant)
- 2013: Oeste (interim)
- 2015: Oeste (interim)
- 2016: Oeste
- 2016–2018: Oeste (assistant)
- 2018: Oeste (interim)
- 2019–2020: Oeste

Renan Roberto de Freitas (born 1 September 1984) is a Brazilian football manager.

== Career ==
Born in São Paulo, Freitas started working at Oeste in 2010. He joined the club's staff in 2012, as an assistant manager.

On 16 October 2013, after Ivan Baitello's dismissal, Freitas was named interim manager of the club, being in charge during a 3–0 loss at ASA two days later. After the appointment of Luís Carlos Martins, he returned to his previous role.

In October 2015, Freitas was again interim in the place of sacked Roberto Cavalo. After managing to avoid relegation, he was definitely appointed as manager for the 2016 Campeonato Paulista.

Freitas was dismissed by the club on 2 April 2016, just hours before a match against São Paulo, but continued to work as an assistant in the following years. He was also an interim during the first matches of the 2018 campaign, as Cavalo was out due to personal problems.

On 7 December 2018, Freitas was appointed permanent manager of Oeste for the upcoming season. He was sacked on 30 September 2020, after only four wins in 25 matches of the campaign.
