= Wilsão =

Brazilian football manager and former player

Personal information
- Full name: Wilson Vaterkemper
- Date of birth: 11 September 1967 (age 59)
- Place of birth: Orleans, Brazil
- Height: 1.93 m (6 ft 4 in)
- Position: Centre back

Youth career
- 1985–1987: Criciúma

Senior career*
Years	Team	Apps	(Gls)
1987–1997	Criciúma	298	(19)
1997	Goiás	24	(0)
1998	Criciúma	46	(3)
1999	União Barbarense	26	(1)
1999	Criciúma	30	(5)
2000	União Barbarense		
2000	Avaí		
2001	Ceará	8	(0)
2002	União Barbarense		
2002	Avaí		

Managerial career
- 2006–2010: Criciúma U20
- 2010: Criciúma
- 2011–2013: Criciúma U20
- 2013–2015: Criciúma (assistant)
- 2014: Criciúma (interim)
- 2015: Criciúma U20
- 2019–2020: Criciúma (assistant)
- 2019: Criciúma (interim)
- 2019: Criciúma (interim)
- 2021: Criciúma (interim)
- * Club domestic league appearances and goals

Wilson Vaterkemper (born 3 September 1963), known as Wilsão or just Wilson, is a Brazilian football coach and former player who played as a central defender.

== Playing career ==
Born in Orleans, Santa Catarina, Wilsão began his senior career in 1987 with Criciúma. During his first spell at the club, he won four Campeonato Catarinense tournaments, aside from lifting the 1991 Copa do Brasil and playing in the 1992 Copa Libertadores, where he scored in a 3–2 home win against Sporting Cristal on 7 May.

Wilsão moved to Goiás in 1997, but returned to Criciúma for the 1998 season. After one year as a starter, he helped União Barbarense to achieve their best-ever campaign in the Campeonato Paulista after finishing sixth; at the latter side, he was known as Wilson Criciúma.

In 2000, after another periods at Criciúma and União Barbarense, Wilsão signed for Avaí. He joined Ceará in 2001, and retired in the following year with Avaí after another spell at Barbarense.

== Managerial career ==
After retiring, Wilsão started working as a manager at Criciúma's youth categories. In January 2010, after the dismissal of Itamar Schülle, he was named interim manager, and subsequently appointed in a permanent manner in February. He was, however, sacked in March.

Wilsão returned to Tigre in 2011, again to work in the club's youth setup. He became an assistant manager of the main squad after the appointment of Sílvio Criciúma in 2013, but was fired from the club in April 2015; he was also an interim manager for three matches in 2014.

Wilsão again returned to Criciúma in November 2015, as a manager of the under-20 squad. He left in the end of the year before rejoining the club in May 2018, as a youth coordinator.

Wilsão was an assistant manager of Criciúma for the 2019 and 2020 campaigns, being also an interim for two different periods. He left in October 2020, but was announced back at the club in December under the role of director of youth football.

On 1 April 2021, Wilsão was again named interim manager, in the place of sacked Hemerson Maria. Late in the month, after the club's first-ever relegation in the Catarinense, he was named general coordinator.

== Honours ==
=== Player ===
Criciúma

- Campeonato Catarinense: 1989, 1990, 1991, 1993, 1995, 1998
- Copa do Brasil: 1991

Goiás

- Campeonato Goiano: 1997
