= Guilherme Martineli =

Brazilian footballer

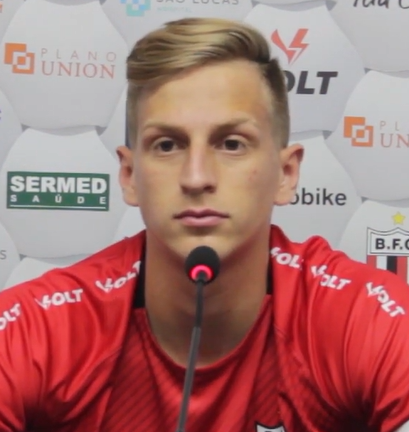
- Martineli in 2021

Personal information
- Full name: Guilherme Martineli Soares
- Date of birth: 17 May 1999 (age 27)
- Place of birth: Nova Luzitânia, Brazil
- Height: 1.80 m (5 ft 11 in)
- Position: Defensive midfielder

Team information
- Current team: São José-SP
- Number: 16

Youth career
- 2014–2018: Red Bull Brasil
- 2018–2019: Internacional
- 2019: Botafogo-SP

Senior career*
Years	Team	Apps	(Gls)
2020–2022	Botafogo-SP	23	(1)
2023	Maringá	7	(0)
2024	Velo Clube	20	(1)
2024	FC Cascavel	10	(0)
2025–	São José-SP	25	(0)
2025	→ Floresta (loan)	19	(0)
2026	→ Altos (loan)	4	(0)
- * Club domestic league appearances and goals as of 20:00, 11 July 2026 (UTC)

Guilherme Martineli Soares (born 17 May 1999) is a Brazilian footballer who plays for São José-SP. Mainly a defensive midfielder, he can also play as a left-back.

== Career ==
Born in Nova Luzitânia, São Paulo, Martineli played for Red Bull Brasil and Internacional as a youth before moving to Botafogo-SP in August 2019. He made his professional debut on 25 October 2020, starting in a 2–1 Série B home win over Vitória.

On 12 December 2022, after failing to establish himself as a regular starter, Martineli moved to Maringá. On 22 December of the following year, after being rarely used, he signed for Velo Clube.

Martineli was presented at FC Cascavel on 23 April 2024, but returned to his native state on 6 November after being announced at São José-SP. On 8 April 2025, he was loaned to Série C side Floresta.

Back to Águia do Vale for the 2026 season, Martineli featured sparingly before being loaned out to Altos on 30 April.

== Career statistics ==
As of 11 July 2026

Club	Season	League			State League		Cup		Continental		Other		Total	
Club	Season	Division	Apps	Goals	Apps	Goals	Apps	Goals	Apps	Goals	Apps	Goals	Apps	Goals
Botafogo-SP	2020	Série B	8	0	—		—		—		2 (Note: Appearance(s) in Copa Paulista)	0	10	0
Botafogo-SP	2021	Série C	8	0	6	1	—		—		6	0	20	1
Botafogo-SP	2022	Série C	0	0	1	0	—		—		4	0	5	0
Botafogo-SP	Total		16	0	7	1	—		—		12	0	35	1
Maringá	2023	Série D	1	0	6	0	—		—		—		7	0
Velo Clube	2024	Paulista A2	—		20	1	—		—		—		20	1
FC Cascavel	2024	Série D	10	0	—		—		—		—		10	0
São José-SP	2025	Paulista A2	—		13	0	—		—		—		13	0
São José-SP	2026	Paulista A2	—		12	0	—		—		0	0	12	0
São José-SP	Total		—		25	0	—		—		0	0	25	0
Floresta (loan)	2025	Série C	19	0	—		—		—		—		19	0
Altos (loan)	2026	Série D	4	0	—		—		—		—		4	0
Career total			50	0	58	2	0	0	0	0	12	0	120	2

== Honours ==
Velo Clube

- Campeonato Paulista Série A2: 2024
