= Thalles (footballer, born 1998) =

Brazilian footballer

Personal information
- Full name: Thalles Gabriel Morais dos Reis
- Date of birth: 3 January 1998 (age 28)
- Place of birth: Patos de Minas, Brazil
- Height: 1.76 m (5 ft 9 in)
- Position: Midfielder

Team information
- Current team: Goiatuba

Senior career*
Years	Team	Apps	(Gls)
2016–2022	Goiás	45	(5)
2020–2021	→ Brasil de Pelotas (loan)	5	(0)
2021–2022	→ Ponte Preta (loan)	19	(1)
2023	Inter de Limeira	0	(0)
2023	XV de Piracicaba	1	(0)
2024	Real Brasília	2	(0)
2025–	Goiatuba	32	(6)
- * Club domestic league appearances and goals as of 19 November 2026

Thalles Gabriel Morais dos Reis (born 3 January 1998), known simply as Thalles, is a Brazilian professional footballer who plays as a midfielder for Goiatuba.

== Career ==
Thalles made his professional debut with Goiás in a 1–1 Campeonato Brasileiro Série B tie with Fluminense FC on 21 May 2016. After a spell on loan at Brasil de Pelotas, Thalles moved out on loan again in February 2021, this time joining Ponte Preta.

== Honours ==
Goiás

- Campeonato Goiano: 2016, 2017, 2018
