= Cláudio Tencati =

Brazilian football manager (born 1973)

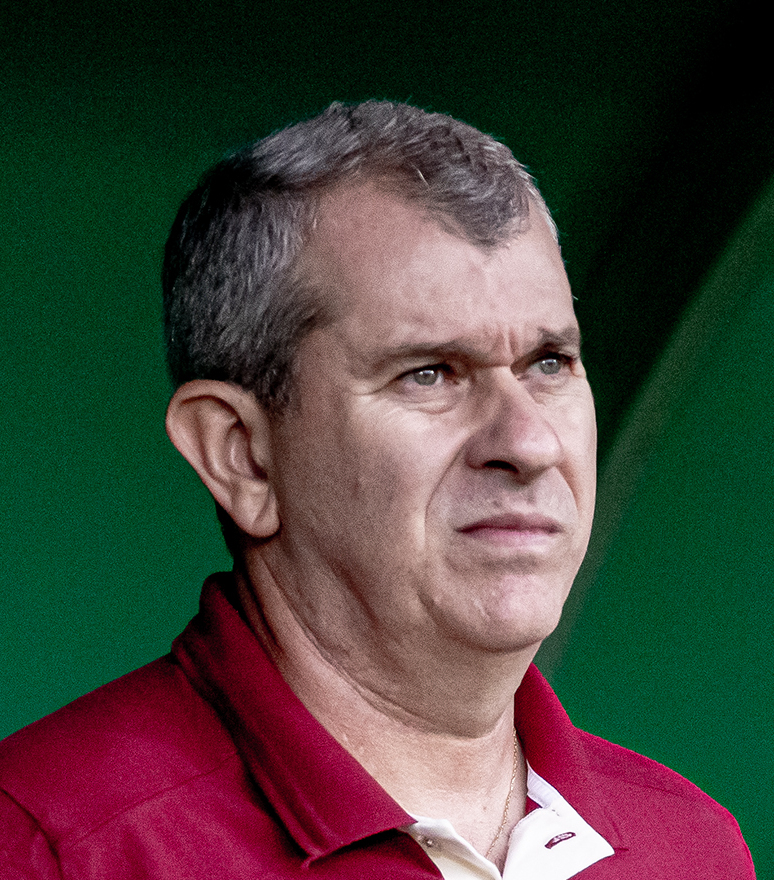
- Tencati in 2026

Personal information
- Full name: Cláudio Aparecido Tencati
- Date of birth: 9 December 1973 (age 52)
- Place of birth: Indianópolis, Brazil

Team information
- Current team: Botafogo-SP (head coach)

Managerial career
- Years: Team
- 2002–2005: Cianorte U20
- 2002–2006: Cianorte (assistant)
- 2005: Cianorte (interim)
- 2006–2008: Cianorte
- 2009: Paranavaí
- 2010–2011: Iraty U20
- 2011–2017: Londrina
- 2018: Atlético Goianiense
- 2019: Vitória
- 2019: Londrina
- 2020–2021: Brasil de Pelotas
- 2021–2024: Criciúma
- 2025: Atlético Goianiense
- 2025: Juventude
- 2026–: Botafogo-SP

Cláudio Aparecido Tencati (born 9 December 1973) is a Brazilian football coach, currently the head coach of Botafogo-SP.

== Career ==
Born in Indianópolis, Paraná, Tencati started his career with Cianorte, being a fitness coach and youth coach between 1997 and 2005. Ahead of the 2006 Taça FPF, after being an assistant and interim during the 2005 Série C, he was named head coach of the main squad.

Tencati was sacked from Cianorte on 16 October 2008, and was named in charge of Paranavaí for the 2009 campaign. Dismissed on 2 February of that year, he then moved to Iraty in 2010 to work as manager of the under-20 side.

On 21 April 2011, Tencati was named the new head coach of Londrina. While at the club, he won the 2011 Campeonato Paranaense Série Prata, the 2014 Campeonato Paranaense, and achieved two consecutive promotions in the 2014 Série D and the 2015 Série C. Additionally, he also won the 2017 Primeira Liga.

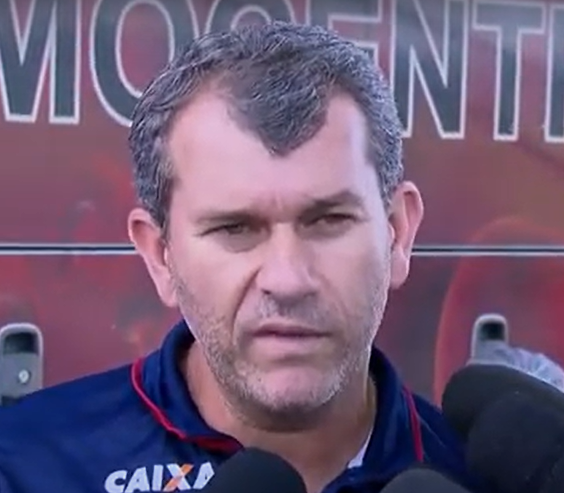
Tencati in 2018

In November 2017, Tencati left Londrina after six years in charge. He took over fellow Série B side Atlético Goianiense on 30 January of the following year, but was sacked on 13 October.

On 19 March 2019, Tencati replaced Marcelo Chamusca at the helm of Vitória, but was himself dismissed on 19 May. He returned to Londrina on 22 August, but was sacked on 28 September after only one win in eight matches.

On 1 November 2020, Tencati was appointed in charge of Brasil de Pelotas. Sacked on 29 July of the following year, he replaced Paulo Baier at the helm of Criciúma on 5 October.

Tencati led Tigre to a promotion to the second division in his first season, won the Campeonato Catarinense Série B in his second, and also won the Campeonato Catarinense in his third, while also achieving promotion to the Série A; on 28 November 2023, he renewed his contract with the club for a further year.

On 8 December 2024, after suffering top tier relegation, Tencati announced his departure from Tigre. On 13 March of the following year, he returned to Atlético Goianiense, but left the club two months later to take over Juventude.

On 29 July 2025, Tencati was sacked by Ju, with the club in the relegation zone. On 24 November, he was announced as head coach of Botafogo-SP for the upcoming season.

== Managerial statistics ==
As of 4 August 2025

Managerial record by team and tenure
Team	Nat	From	To	Record								Ref
Team	Nat	From	To	G	W	D	L	GF	GA	GD	Win %	Ref
Cianorte (interim)	(Brazil)	April 2005	September 2005	6	1	3	2	4	6	−2	16.67	
Cianorte	(Brazil)	September 2006	16 October 2008	73	31	24	18	119	96	+23	42.47	
Paranavaí	(Brazil)	November 2008	2 February 2009	3	0	2	1	2	4	−2	0.00	
Londrina	(Brazil)	21 April 2011	25 November 2017	266	130	71	65	371	229	+142	48.87	
Atlético Goianiense	(Brazil)	30 January 2018	13 October 2018	40	16	12	12	53	52	+1	40.00	
Vitória	(Brazil)	19 March 2019	19 May 2019	7	1	2	4	7	15	−8	14.29	
Londrina	(Brazil)	22 August 2019	28 September 2019	8	1	0	7	6	15	−9	12.50	
Brasil de Pelotas	(Brazil)	1 November 2020	29 July 2021	43	12	15	16	34	41	−7	27.91	
Criciúma	(Brazil)	5 October 2021	8 December 2024	172	72	51	49	198	156	+42	41.86	
Atlético Goianiense	(Brazil)	13 March 2025	13 May 2025	9	2	5	2	11	11	+0	22.22	
Juventude	(Brazil)	13 May 2025	29 July 2025	7	1	1	5	1	2	−1	14.29	
Botafogo	(Brazil)	24 November 2025	present	31	11	9	11	33	32	+1	35.48	
Total				660	277	195	188	839	659	+180	41.97	—

== Honours ==
Londrina

- Campeonato Paranaense Série Prata: 2011
- Campeonato Paranaense: 2014
- Primeira Liga: 2017

Criciúma

- Campeonato Catarinense Série B: 2022
- Campeonato Catarinense: 2023
- Recopa Catarinense: 2024
