= Carlos Amadeu =

Brazilian football manager (1965–2020)

Personal information
- Full name: Carlos Amadeu Nascimento Lemos
- Date of birth: 6 September 1965
- Place of birth: Salvador, Brazil
- Date of death: 15 November 2020 (aged 55)
- Place of death: Riyadh, Saudi Arabia
- Position: Left back

Youth career
- 1983–1985: Bahia

Senior career*
Years	Team	Apps	(Gls)
1984–1989	Bahia		
1987	→ Galícia (loan)		

Managerial career
- 1992–1994: Vitória U17
- 1995: Vitória U20
- 2000–2002: Bahia U17
- 2003–2005: Bahia U20
- 2005–2008: Bahia (assistant)
- 2005: Bahia (interim)
- 2005: Bahia (interim)
- 2005: Bahia (interim)
- 2009–2014: Vitória U20
- 2014: Vitória (interim)
- 2014–2016: Vitória (assistant)
- 2015: Vitória (interim)
- 2015–2017: Brazil U17
- 2018–2019: Brazil U20
- 2019: Vitória
- 2020: Bahia U20
- 2020: Al Hilal U19
Medal record
Men's football
Representing Brazil (as manager)
FIFA U-17 World Cup
Bronze medal – third place	2017
- * Club domestic league appearances and goals

Carlos Amadeu Nascimento Lemos (6 September 1965 – 15 November 2020) was a Brazilian footballer and coach who played as a left back. He represented Bahia as a player before injury curtailed his career. He went on to have a coaching career which spanned almost thirty years.

== Playing career ==
Born in Salvador, Bahia, Amadeu joined Bahia's youth setup in 1983. He was definitely promoted to the main squad in 1985, after already being a part of the team who won the Campeonato Baiano in the previous year.

In 1987, after two seasons as a senior, Amadeu moved to Galícia. After impressing during his spell at the side, he returned to Bahia and was a part of the 1988 Campeonato Brasileiro Série A squad which lifted the trophy. In October 1988, however, he suffered a compound fracture in his arm which led to three surgeries, and after a year without playing, he retired.

== Coaching career ==
Amadeu started his coaching career at Vitória in 1991, as a fitness coach of the under-20s. He subsequently coached the under-17 and under-20 squads in the following years, but in 1996 left to work in futsal.

Amadeu returned to Bahia in 2000, being in charge of the youth squads until early 2005, when he became Hélio dos Anjos' assistant coach of the main squad. On 18 April of that year, after dos Anjos was dismissed, he took over the first team in an interim manner; he also took the role in two more occasions, after the departures of Jair Picerni and Procópio Cardoso.

In 2009 Amadeu returned to Vitória, being in charge of the under-20s. In May 2014, he was the interim coach of the first team for one match, and in December of that year, he became an assistant of the main squad. In May 2015, he was appointed head coach of the Brazil national under-17 team.

On 24 January 2018, after winning the 2017 South American U-17 Championship, Amadeu was confirmed as head coach of the under-20 national team. On 22 February of the following year, he left the post, following Brazil's poor performance in the 2019 South American U-20 Championship which saw them finish fifth and miss out on qualification for the 2019 FIFA U-20 World Cup.

On 5 August 2019, Amadeu rejoined Vitória for a third spell, now appointed first team coach. On 18 September, after only nine matches in charge, he was sacked, and returned to his first club Bahia the following 6 February, being named head coach of the under-20s. In August 2020 Amadeu moved to Saudi Arabia to manage Al Hilal's under-19 team.

== Personal life ==
Amadeu was married to Dora and had two sons Mateus and Ricardo. Ricardo, the elder, is the under-15 coach and under-20 assistant coach at Vitória. In 2012 Amadeu developed difficulties in hearing in one ear and by 2020 had lost hearing in that ear and had only 30% hearing in the other, relying on a hearing aid.

== Death ==
On 15 November 2020, Amadeu was found dead in Riyadh after having a heart attack.

== Honours ==
=== Player ===
Bahia

- Campeonato Brasileiro Série A: 1988
- Campeonato Baiano: 1984, 1988

=== Coach ===
Brazil U17

- South American U-17 Championship: 2017
