= Indianópolis, Paraná =

Coordinates: 23°28′33″S 52°41′45″W

- Municipality
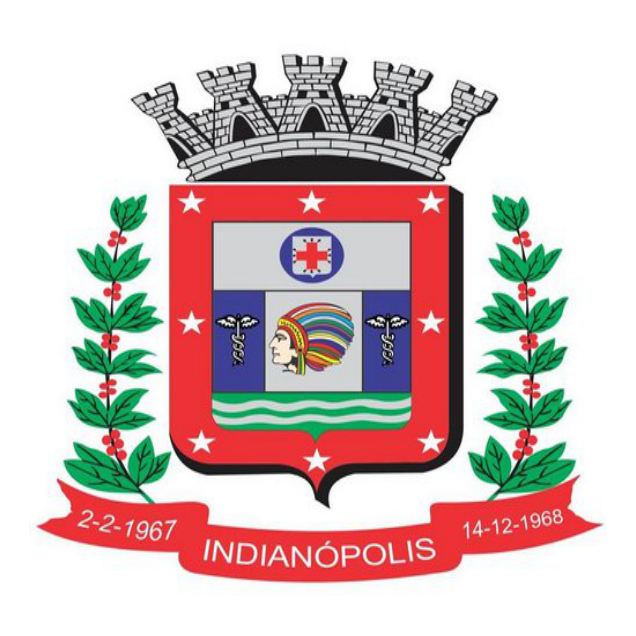
- Flag Coat of arms
- Interactive map of Indianópolis, Paraná
- Country: Brazil
- Region: Southern
- State: Paraná
- Mesoregion: Noroeste Paranaense

Population (2020)
  - Total: 4,465
- Time zone: UTC−3 (BRT)

Indianópolis is a municipality in the state of Paraná in the Southern Region of Brazil.

== See also ==
- List of municipalities in Paraná
