= Alemão (footballer, born 1975) =

Brazilian footballer and coach

Personal information
- Full name: Cidimar Aparecido Ernegas
- Date of birth: 1 March 1975 (age 51)
- Place of birth: Curitiba, Brazil
- Height: 1.77 m (5 ft 10 in)
- Position: Defensive midfielder

Youth career
- 1989–1990: Juventus-SP
- 1991: Blumenau
- 1992–1994: Londrina

Senior career*
Years	Team	Apps	(Gls)
1994–1995	Londrina		
1995–1997	XV de Piracicaba		
1998	Ituano		
1998	Londrina		
1999	Ituano		
1999	Londrina		
2000	União Barbarense		
2000	Brasil de Pelotas		
2001	Caldense		
2002	Monza	4	(0)
2002–2004	Paulista		
2004–2005	Paysandu		
2006	Ulbra		
2006–2007	J. Malucelli		
2008	Adap Galo Maringá		

International career
1995-1996	Brazil U20		

Managerial career
- 2009–2010: Junior Team (youth)
- 2017–2018: Londrina (youth)
- 2019: Londrina
- 2019: Londrina (assistant)
- 2019: Londrina
- 2020–2021: Londrina
- * Club domestic league appearances and goals

Cidimar Aparecido Ernegas (born 1 March 1975), commonly known as Alemão, is a Brazilian professional football manager and former player who played as a defensive midfielder.

== Playing career ==
Born in Curitiba but raised in Nova Esperança, Alemão finished his formation with Londrina. He was promoted to the first team in 1994, being transferred to XV de Piracicaba in the following year.

Alemão subsequently represented Ituano, União Barbarense, Brasil de Pelotas, Caldense, Paulista, Paysandu, Ulbra, J. Malucelli and Adap Galo Maringá, aside from two spells back at his first side Londrina and a short stint at Italy's Monza in 2002. He retired with Adap in 2008, aged 33.

== Managerial career ==
Alemão began his managerial career with his Junior Team's youth setup in 2009, being in charge of the club's under-15 and under-17 squads. He subsequently worked for six years as a technical advisor at the Fundação de Esportes de Londrina and as manager of Colégio Marista’s futsal youth team, before returning to Londrina in 2017, as a manager of the under-17s.

Alemão was promoted to the under-19 squad for the 2018 season, and achieved an impressive run of 19 matches undefeated. On 19 November 2018, he replaced Roberto Fonseca as manager of the main squad for the 2019 Campeonato Paranaense. Alemão was named assistant as Fonseca returned to the club in April 2019, but was again appointed manager shortly after, due to Fonseca's resignation.

Alemão was sacked on 21 August 2019, but returned to the role for the 2020 campaign.

== Honours ==
=== Player ===
XV de Piracicaba

- Campeonato Brasileiro Série C: 1995
