= Fábio Moreno =

Brazilian football manager

Personal information
- Full name: Fábio Ribeiro Moreno
- Date of birth: 30 May 1982 (age 44)
- Place of birth: Campinas, Brazil

Team information
- Current team: Athletico Paranaense (assistant)

Managerial career
- Years: Team
- 2018: Fluminense (assistant)
- 2018: Fluminense (interim)
- 2019: Flamengo (assistant)
- 2019: Cruzeiro (assistant)
- 2020: Ponte Preta (interim)
- 2020: Ponte Preta (interim)
- 2020: Ponte Preta (interim)
- 2020–2021: Ponte Preta
- 2025–: Athletico Paranaense (assistant)

Fábio Ribeiro Moreno (born 30 May 1982) is a Brazilian football coach. He is the current assistant coach of Athletico Paranaense.

== Career ==
Born in Campinas, São Paulo, Moreno started working as a technical observer at Ponte Preta in 2003. After working with a number of clubs under the same role, he was invited to work with Abel Braga at Fluminense in August 2012, after his father died.

Moreno subsequently worked as a technical observer for Braga at Internacional, Al Jazira and back at Fluminense, while also working under the same role for the Brazil Olympic team at the 2016 Summer Olympics; when Braga spent some time away from coaching, he returned to Ponte Preta.

Moreno was appointed interim head coach of Flu on 29 November 2018, after the dismissal of Marcelo Oliveira, and took charge of his first professional match three days later, a 1–0 home win against América Mineiro. He then returned to work with Braga under the assistant role at Flamengo and Cruzeiro.

On 24 December 2019, Moreno returned to Ponte, now as a technical coordinator. He was also an interim head coach of the first team on three occasions during the 2020 campaign before being definitely appointed head coach on 18 December.

On 22 May 2021, Moreno returned to his previous coordinator role. He left the club in December, being a part of Odair Hellmann's staff at Al Wasl, Santos, Al-Riyadh, Al-Raed and Athletico Paranaense, becoming his assistant coach at the latter.
