= Roberto Cavalo =

Brazilian footballer

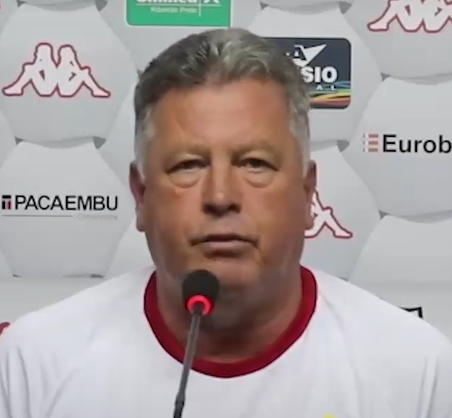
- Cavalo in 2019

Personal information
- Full name: Roberto Fernando Schneiger
- Date of birth: 13 April 1963 (age 63)
- Place of birth: Carazinho, Brazil
- Position: Defensive midfielder

Senior career*
Years	Team	Apps	(Gls)
1985–1988	Atlético Paranaense	39	(8)
1989–1992	Criciúma	159	(53)
1993–1994	Vitória	67	(15)
1994–1995	Botafogo	24	(5)
1995–1997	Sport	45	(10)
1997	Avaí	13	(4)
Total		347	(95)

Managerial career
- 1998–1999: Avaí
- 1999: Anapolina
- 2000–2001: Avaí
- 2001: Joinville
- 2002: Caxias
- 2002: União São João
- 2003: Chapecoense
- 2003–2004: Gama
- 2004: Avaí
- 2004: União Barbarense
- 2005: Paysandu
- 2005: Náutico
- 2005–2006: Santo André
- 2006: Náutico
- 2006–2007: CRB
- 2007: Marília
- 2007: Gama
- 2007: Criciúma
- 2008: América de Natal
- 2008: Gama
- 2008: Bahia
- 2009: Confiança
- 2009: Paraná
- 2009: Mixto
- 2010: Vila Nova
- 2010–2011: Paraná
- 2011–2012: Vila Nova
- 2012: Oeste
- 2012: Bragantino
- 2012–2013: Grêmio Barueri
- 2013: Oeste
- 2014: Atlético Sorocaba
- 2014–2015: Oeste
- 2015–2016: Criciúma
- 2017–2018: Oeste
- 2019: Botafogo-SP
- 2019–2020: Criciúma
- 2020–2021: Oeste
- 2022: XV de Piracicaba
- 2023: Taubaté
- 2023: Brasiliense
- 2024: Monte Azul
- 2024–2025: Itabaiana
- * Club domestic league appearances and goals

Roberto Fernando Schneiger (born 13 April 1963), known as Roberto Cavalo, is a Brazilian professional football coach and former player who played as a defensive midfielder.

== Career as a player ==
Born in Carazinho, Roberto Cavalo began his career with Atlético Paranaense, with whom he made his debut in the top Division against Criciúma and in 1991 he was part of the squad won the 1991 Copa do Brasil. He then Vitória in the Campeonato Brasileiro Série A, it was a positive season: seven goals in twenty-three matches earned him inclusion in the League best eleven (Bola de Prata). During that same season he also played two final tournament, lost to Botafogo. Transferred to Sport and Avaí, where he finished his career in 1997.

== Career as a manager ==
Since 1998 he coached the Avaí. Already in 2004, brilliant fez campaign in the Campeonato Brasileiro Série B having been one of four finalists (it ended at a third honorable place).

Then it assumed several teams in Brazil like Joinville, Chapecoense, Gama, Paysandu, Naútico, Criciúma, America de Natal and Bahia. On 11 September 2009, it was announced like new commander of the Paraná. some months later it was announced like new technician of the Mixto for the season 2010. it trained still Town Nov, disputing the Série B. Again it returned to Paraná and to Town in November. In 2012 it assumed the West and Grêmio Barueri. and 2013, put his return right to the West. In 2014 it was announced like new trainer of the Atlético Sorocaba not lasting very much in the post was dismissed in the same year and in the same year, it put his third passage right to the West to dispute the remainder of the Série B and being in 2015 up to the moment disputing of Campeonato Paulista Série A2 in 2015.

== Honours ==
=== Player ===
Atlético Paranaense

- Campeonato Paranaense: 1988

Criciúma

- Campeonato Catarinense: 1991
- Copa do Brasil: 1991

=== Manager ===
Avaí

- Campeonato Brasileiro Série C: 1998

Paysandu

- Campeonato Paraense: 2005

=== Individual ===
- Bola de Prata: 1993

== Managerial statistics ==
As of match played 20 July 2025

Managerial record by team and tenure
Team	Nat	From	To	Record							
Team	Nat	From	To	G	W	D	L	GF	GA	GD	Win %
Gama	(Brazil)	9 February 2007	11 September 2007	40	13	13	14	56	41	+15	32.50
Oeste	(Brazil)	11 February 2012	9 August 2012	20	9	5	6	36	32	+4	45.00
Oeste	(Brazil)	2 February 2013	18 July 2013	24	8	6	10	30	39	−9	33.33
Oeste	(Brazil)	20 August 2014	10 October 2015	70	28	22	20	83	75	+8	40.00
Criciúma	(Brazil)	10 October 2015	29 November 2016	69	30	13	26	93	76	+17	43.48
Oeste	(Brazil)	1 January 2017	2 December 2018	117	40	47	30	133	118	+15	34.19
Oeste	(Brazil)	23 October 2020	9 July 2021	46	18	12	16	48	48	+0	39.13
Brasiliense	(Brazil)	9 March 2023	9 June 2023	14	7	2	5	17	18	−1	50.00
Monte Azul	(Brazil)	2 February 2024	9 March 2024	8	1	3	4	7	15	−8	12.50
Itabaiana	(Brazil)	25 April 2024	2 June 2025	44	20	12	12	62	39	+23	45.45
Total				452	174	135	143	565	501	+64	38.50
