= Márcio Coelho =

Brazilian football manager

Personal information
- Full name: Márcio Luís Lyra Coelho
- Date of birth: 8 June 1978 (age 48)
- Place of birth: Araranguá, Brazil
- Height: 1.74 m (5 ft 9 in)
- Position: Winger

Senior career*
Years	Team	Apps	(Gls)
- América-RS
- Unisul Florianópolis
2002–2004	Ibi		
- Colegial
- Cabo Frio/Arraial/Cimed

Managerial career
- 2011–2013: Figueirense U15
- 2013–2015: Figueirense U17
- 2015–2017: Figueirense U20
- 2017–2019: Figueirense (assistant)
- 2017: Figueirense (interim)
- 2017: Figueirense (interim)
- 2019: Figueirense (interim)
- 2020: Figueirense
- 2021: Paraná
- 2023: Guarani de Palhoça U20
- 2023: Guarani de Palhoça
- * Club domestic league appearances and goals

Márcio Luís Lyra Coelho (born 8 June 1978) is a Brazilian football coach. He was also a futsal player, and played as a winger.

== Career ==
Born in Araranguá, Santa Catarina, he was known as Genro da Lindaura during his playing days. A futsal winger, he represented Grêmio Esportivo América, Universidade do Sul de Santa Catarina (Florianópolis), Associação Desportiva Colegial and Centro Esportivo Cabo Frio in his home country, aside from two years in Spain with Ibi FS.

In 2011, Coelho started working as a manager with Figueirense's youth setup. On 13 February 2017, he was appointed assistant manager of the main squad, acting as an interim manager for two occasions during the year.

In July 2019, after the club was in a severe financial crisis and threatened with relegation in the Série B, Coelho replaced sacked Vinícius Eutrópio as manager, in an interim manner. After the appointment of Pintado in October, he returned to his previous role, but on 11 December, he was named permanent manager of the club for the ensuing season.

On 27 August 2020, Coelho was sacked by Figueira. On 6 January of the following year, he replaced Gilmar Dal Pozzo at the helm of Paraná also in the second division.
