= 2026 Campeonato Goiano =

Campeonato Goiano
- Season: 2026
- Dates: 10 January – 15 March
- Champions: Goiás
- Relegated: Centro Oeste; Inhumas
- Matches: 70
- Goals: 176 (2.51 per match)

The 2026 Campeonato Goiano (officially the Goianão Novomundo.com 2026 for sponsorship reasons) was the 83rd edition of Goiás's top professional football league organized by FGF. The competition began on 10 January and ended on 15 March 2026.

The competition features Anapolina and Centro Oeste, who were promoted from the 2025 Campeonato Goiano da Divisão de Acesso and took the places of the teams relegated in 2025. Vila Nova are the defending champions.

== Participating teams ==
Club	Home city	Manager
ABECAT	Ouvidor	Rogério Henrique
Anapolina	Anápolis	Alan George
Anápolis	Anápolis	Ângelo Luiz
Aparecidense	Aparecida de Goiânia	Augusto Fassina
Atlético Goianiense	Goiânia	Rafael Lacerda
Centro Oeste	Senador Canedo	Leandro Sena
CRAC	Catalão	Cléber Gaúcho
Goiás	Goiânia	Daniel Paulista
Goiatuba	Goiatuba	Glauber Ramos
Inhumas	Inhumas	Anderson Gomes
Jataiense	Jataí	Gian Rodrigues
Vila Nova	Goiânia	Umberto Louzer

== Format ==
In the first stage, the 12 teams were drawn into three groups of four teams each.

Group A	Group B	Group C
Vila Nova; CRAC; Inhumas; Goiatuba	Anápolis; Goiás; Jataiense; Aparecidense	Atlético Goianiense; ABECAT; Centro Oeste; Anapolina

Each team will compete in a single round-robin tournament, playing against the eight clubs from the other groups. The teams will be ranked according to points. If tied on points, the following criteria will be used to determine the ranking: 1. Wins; 2. Goal difference; 3. Goals scored; 4. Fewest red cards; 5. Fewest yellow cards; 6. Draw. These criteria will also be used to determine the overall performance in the final stages and the playoffs. Regardless of their group, the eight teams with the best performance will advance to the quarter-finals, while the team that finishes bottom will be relegated to the 2027 Divisão de Acesso.

The final stages (quarter-finals, semi-finals and finals) and the playoffs will be played on a home-and-away two-legged basis. Teams eliminated in the quarter-finals will play in the play-offs to determine places 5–8. For the playoffs, semi-finals and finals the best overall performance team will host the second leg. If tied on aggregate, the penalty shoot-out will be used to determine the winners

The relegation playoff will only take place if the difference in points between 10th and 11th place at the end of the first stage is six points or fewer. If the difference is greater than six points, the team in 11th will be relegated to the 2027 Divisão de Acesso. If, after the first playoff match, the difference in overall points between teams exceeds three points, relegation of the 11th-place team will be confirmed, meaning a second match will not be necessary. Following the playoff matches, the team with the fewest overall points will be relegated to the 2027 Divisão de Acesso.

The number of berths available for the 2027 Copa do Brasil and the 2027 Série D will be allocated based on the overall tournament standings, in accordance with the CBF's qualification criteria.

== First stage ==
=== Group A ===
Pos	Team	Pld	W	D	L	GF	GA	GD	Pts	Qualification or relegation
1	Goiás	8	6	2	0	14	1	+13	20	Advance to quarter-finals
2	Vila Nova	8	6	0	2	18	8	+10	18	Advance to quarter-finals
3	Jataiense	8	4	2	2	13	9	+4	14	Advance to quarter-finals
4	Atlético Goianiense	8	4	2	2	11	8	+3	14 (Note: Red cards: Atlético Goianiense 1, ABECAT 4.)	Advance to quarter-finals
5	ABECAT	8	4	2	2	11	8	+3	14	Advance to quarter-finals
6	Anapolina	8	4	0	4	10	12	−2	12	Advance to quarter-finals
7	Anápolis	8	3	2	3	11	12	−1	11	Advance to quarter-finals
8	CRAC	8	2	3	3	5	6	−1	9	Advance to quarter-finals
9	Goiatuba	8	2	1	5	8	15	−7	7	
10	Aparecidense	8	1	3	4	10	14	−4	6	Advance to relegation playoff
11	Centro Oeste	8	1	3	4	4	15	−11	6	Advance to relegation playoff
12	Inhumas	8	0	2	6	4	11	−7	2	Relegation to the Divisão de Acesso

Source: FGF

== Relegation play-off ==
14 February 2026
15:30

Centro Oeste	4–2	Aparecidense
Fernando Viana 33', 38', 45'; Maycon Lucas 90+2'		Raphael Luz 43' (pen.); Marcão 90'

Estádio Jaime Guerra, Nerópolis
Referee: Breno Vieira Souza

18 February 2026
19:30

Aparecidense	4–0	Centro Oeste
Darlan 12'; Lauro 14'; Marcão 43'; Luan 79'

Estádio Annibal Batista de Toledo, Aparecida de Goiânia
Referee: Wilton Sampaio

=== Overall standings ===
Pos	Team	Pld	W	D	L	GF	GA	GD	Pts	Relegation
1	Aparecidense	10	2	3	5	16	18	−2	9	
2	Centro Oeste	10	2	3	5	8	21	−13	9	Relegation to the Divisão de Acesso

Source: FGF

Aparecidense and Centro Oeste were tied on nine points and two matches won in the overall standings. Centro Oeste were relegated due to their inferior goal difference.

== Final stages ==
=== Bracket ===
Quarter-finals
ABECAT	0	1	1
Atlético Goianiense	3	1	4
Anápolis	0	2	2
Vila Nova	2	2	4
Anapolina	1	1	2
Jataiense	1	0	1
CRAC	1	1	2
Goiás	1	4	5

Semi-finals
Atlético Goianiense	2	0	2
Vila Nova	0	0	0
Anapolina	2	1	3 (3)
Goiás (p)	2	1	3 (4)

Finals
Atlético Goianiense	0	0	0
Goiás	2	0	2

=== Quarter-finals ===
Team 1	Agg.	Team 2	1st leg	2nd leg
CRAC	2–5	Goiás	1–1	1–4
Anápolis	2–4	Vila Nova	0–2	2–2
Anapolina	2–1	Jataiense	1–1	1–0
ABECAT	1–4	Atlético Goianiense	0–3	1–1

==== Group D ====
11 February 2026
19:30

CRAC	1–1	Goiás
Thiaguinho 60'		Lucas Rodrigues 11'

Arena Rifertil, Catalão
Referee: Gabriel dos Santos Queiroz

14 February 2026
17:00

Goiás	4–1	CRAC
Lucas Rodrigues 28'; Anselmo Ramon 58' (pen.), 90'; Jean Carlos 76'		João Veras 90+2'

Estádio da Serrinha, Goiânia
Referee: Osimar Moreira da Silva Júnior

Goiás advanced to the semi-finals

==== Group E ====
12 February 2026
21:00

Anápolis	0–2	Vila Nova
		João Vieira 28' (pen.), 69'

Estádio Jonas Duarte, Anápolis
Referee: Jefferson Ferreira de Moraes

16 February 2026
19:30

Vila Nova	2–2	Anápolis
João Vieira 46'; Dellatorre 90+1'		Matheus Lagoa 45+3' (pen.); João Borim 86'

Estádio Olímpico Pedro Ludovico, Goiânia
Referee: Victor Lucas Pereira Silva

Vila Nova advanced to the semi-finals

==== Group F ====
11 February 2026
19:30

Anapolina	1–1	Jataiense
Wadson 13'		Assis 82'

Estádio Jonas Duarte, Anápolis
Referee: Anderson Ribeiro Gonçalves

15 February 2026
16:00

Jataiense	0–1	Anapolina
		Cesinha 77'

Estádio Municipal Jerônimo Ferreira Fraga, Jataí
Referee: Jean Carlos da Silva Narciso

Anapolina advanced to the semi-finals

==== Group G ====
12 February 2026
19:00

ABECAT	0–3	Atlético Goianiense
		Guilherme Marques 29', 49'; Derek 80'

Estádio Municipal Luiz Benedito, Ouvidor
Referee: Breno Vieira Souza

15 February 2026
16:00

Atlético Goianiense	1–1	ABECAT
Guilherme Marques 58' (pen.)		Uesley Gaúcho

Estádio Antônio Accioly, Goiânia
Referee: Artur de Morais Fernandes

Atlético Goianiense advanced to the semi-finals

=== Play-offs to determine places 5–8 ===
Team 1	Agg.	Team 2	1st leg	2nd leg
CRAC	1–3	Jataiense	1–2	0–1
Anápolis	4–4 (1–4 p)	ABECAT	0–2	4–2

==== Group A ====
21 February 2026
17:00

CRAC	1–2	Jataiense
Luis Felipe 81' (pen.)		Paulinho 24'; Bruninho 44'

Arena Rifertil, Catalão
Referee: Victor Lucas Pereira Silva

28 February 2026
17:00

Jataiense	1–0	CRAC
Mateus Goiano 90+1'

Estádio Municipal Jerônimo Ferreira Fraga, Jataí
Referee: Anderson Ribeiro Gonçalves

==== Group B ====
22 February 2026
16:00

Anápolis	0–2	ABECAT
		Emerson Machado 23'; Jackson 90+1'

Estádio Jonas Duarte, Anápolis
Referee: Gabriel dos Santos Queiroz

28 February 2026
17:00

ABECAT	2–4	Anápolis
Emerson Machado 57', 84'		Gabriel Cipriano 24'; Fernandinho 31'; Gharib 44'; Douglas Souza 83'
Penalties
Marcílio (penalty scored); Juliano (penalty scored); Emerson Machado (penalty scored); Roney (penalty scored)	4–1	(penalty missed) Leonan; (penalty missed) João Borim; (penalty scored) Paulo Henrique

Estádio Municipal Luiz Benedito, Ouvidor
Referee: Jean Carlos da Silva Narciso

==== 5th place playoff ====
Team 1	Agg.	Team 2	1st leg	2nd leg
ABECAT	2–2 (5–3 p)	Jataiense	2–1	0–1

4 March 2026
19:00

ABECAT	2–1	Jataiense
Rafinha 45'; Emerson Machado 57'		Tibúrcio 31'

Estádio Municipal Luiz Benedito, Ouvidor
Referee: Breno Vieira Souza

8 March 2026
16:00

Jataiense	1–0	ABECAT
Assis 75'
Penalties
Pedro Botelho (penalty scored); Gilvan (penalty scored); Assis (penalty missed); Emersonn Bastos (penalty scored)	3–5	(penalty scored) Juliano; (penalty scored) Emerson Machado; (penalty scored) Roney; (penalty scored) Rafinha; (penalty scored) Jackson

Estádio Municipal Jerônimo Ferreira Fraga, Jataí
Referee: Jean Carlos da Silva Narciso

=== Semi-finals ===
Team 1	Agg.	Team 2	1st leg	2nd leg
Anapolina	3–3 (3–4 p)	Goiás	2–2	1–1
Atlético Goianiense	2–0	Vila Nova	2–0	0–0

==== Group H ====
21 February 2026
17:00

Anapolina	2–2	Goiás
Iury Tanque 46', 51'		Jajá 1'; Jean Carlos 13'

Estádio Jonas Duarte, Anápolis
Referee: Jefferson Ferreira de Moraes

28 February 2026
16:00

Goiás	1–1	Anapolina
Nicolas 44'		Iury Tanque 90+1' (pen.)
Penalties
Tadeu (penalty scored); Lucas Lima (penalty missed); Lourenço (penalty scored); Rodrigo Soares (penalty scored); Cadu (penalty scored)	4–3	(penalty scored) Dudu; (penalty scored) Wesley Santos; (penalty scored) Ruan; (penalty missed) Iury Tanque; (penalty missed) Felipe Pacajus

Estádio da Serrinha, Goiânia
Referee: Osimar Moreira da Silva Júnior

Goiás advanced to the finals

==== Group I ====
22 February 2026
17:00

Atlético Goianiense	2–0	Vila Nova
Ramírez 19'; Natã 58'

Estádio Antônio Accioly, Goiânia
Referee: Breno Vieira Souza

1 March 2026
17:00

Vila Nova	0–0	Atlético Goianiense

Estádio Onésio Brasileiro Alvarenga, Goiânia
Referee: Wilton Sampaio

Atlético Goianiense advanced to the finals

=== Finals ===
Team 1	Agg.	Team 2	1st leg	2nd leg
Atlético Goianiense	0–2	Goiás	0–2	0–0

==== Group J ====
7 March 2026
16:00

Atlético Goianiense	0–2	Goiás
		Anselmo Ramon 46', 52'

Estádio Antônio Accioly, Goiânia
Referee: Anderson Daronco (Rio Grande do Sul)

Atlético Goianiense	Goiás

GK	1	(Brazil) Paulo Vítor
DF	2	(Brazil) Matheus Ribeiro		(substituted off) 73'
DF	4	(Brazil) Adriano Martins
DF	3	(Brazil) Natã	(yellow card) 41'	(substituted off) 55'
DF	5	(Paraguay) Junior Barreto		(substituted off) 46'
DF	6	(Brazil) Guilherme Lopes
MF	8	(Brazil) Igor Henrique (c)
MF	7	(Brazil) Leandro Vilela
MF	10	(Brazil) Guilherme Marques		(substituted off) 55'
FW	11	(Brazil) Derek		(substituted off) 46'
FW	9	(Brazil) Léo Jacó
Substitutes:
GK	12	(Brazil) Vladimir
DF	13	(Brazil) Tito		(substituted on) 55'
MF	14	(Brazil) Geovane
MF	15	(Brazil) Matheus Índio
MF	16	(Portugal) Lima
FW	17	(Brazil) Ariel Palácio		(substituted on) 46'
FW	18	(Brazil) Guilherme Henrique		(substituted on) 73'
FW	19	(Brazil) Bruno José		(substituted on) 46'
FW	20	(Brazil) Jean Dias		(substituted on) 55'
FW	21	(Brazil) Allanzinho
Coach:
(Brazil) Rafael Lacerda

GK	23	(Brazil) Tadeu (c)
DF	20	(Brazil) Diego Caito
DF	14	(Brazil) Lucas Ribeiro
DF	25	(Brazil) Luisão
DF	6	(Brazil) Nicolas
MF	5	(Brazil) Filipe Machado		(substituted off) 89'
MF	97	(Brazil) Lourenço		(substituted off) 82'
MF	28	(Brazil) Gegê	(yellow card) 25'
MF	10	(Brazil) Lucas Lima		(substituted off) 70'
FW	21	(Brazil) Jean Carlos		(substituted off) 89'
FW	9	(Brazil) Anselmo Ramon		(substituted off) 70'
Substitutes:
GK	1	(Brazil) Thiago Rodrigues
DF	2	(Brazil) Rodrigo Soares
DF	3	(Brazil) Luiz Felipe		(substituted on) 89'
DF	4	(Brazil) Titi
DF	54	(Brazil) Djalma Silva
MF	8	(Brazil) Juninho		(substituted on) 82'
MF	55	(Brazil) Baldória		(substituted on) 89'
MF	88	(Brazil) Brayann
FW	11	(Brazil) Bruno Sávio
FW	15	(Venezuela) Esli García
FW	17	(Brazil) Pedrinho		(substituted on) 70'
FW	18	(Brazil) Cadu		(substituted on) 70'
Coach:
(Brazil) Daniel Paulista

Assistant referees:
Danilo Ricardo Simon Manis (São Paulo)
Rafael da Silva Alves (Rio Grande do Sul)
Fourth official:
Maguielson Lima Barbosa (Distrito Federal)
Fifth official:
Renato Gomes Tolentino (Distrito Federal)
Video assistant referee:
Rodrigo Nunes de Sá (Rio de Janeiro)
Assistant video assistant referees:
Herman Brumel Vani (São Paulo)

15 March 2026
16:00

Goiás	0–0	Atlético Goianiense

Estádio da Serrinha, Goiânia
Referee: Raphael Claus (São Paulo)

Goiás	Atlético Goianiense

GK	23	(Brazil) Tadeu (c)
DF	20	(Brazil) Diego Caito		(substituted off) 76'
DF	14	(Brazil) Lucas Ribeiro
DF	25	(Brazil) Luisão
DF	6	(Brazil) Nicolas
MF	5	(Brazil) Filipe Machado
MF	97	(Brazil) Lourenço
MF	28	(Brazil) Gegê		(substituted off) 89'
MF	10	(Brazil) Lucas Lima		(substituted off) 70'
FW	21	(Brazil) Jean Carlos		(substituted off) 76'
FW	9	(Brazil) Anselmo Ramon		(substituted off) 70'
Substitutes:
GK	1	(Brazil) Thiago Rodrigues
DF	2	(Brazil) Rodrigo Soares		(substituted on) 76'
DF	3	(Brazil) Luiz Felipe	(yellow card) 90+6'	(substituted on) 70'
DF	29	(Brazil) Murilo Camara
DF	54	(Brazil) Djalma Silva
MF	8	(Brazil) Juninho		(substituted on) 89'
MF	55	(Brazil) Baldória
MF	88	(Brazil) Brayann
FW	11	(Brazil) Bruno Sávio		(substituted on) 76'
FW	15	(Venezuela) Esli García
FW	17	(Brazil) Pedrinho
FW	18	(Brazil) Cadu		(substituted on) 70'
Coach:
(Brazil) Daniel Paulista

GK	1	(Brazil) Paulo Vítor
DF	2	(Brazil) Natã		(substituted off) 57'
DF	3	(Brazil) Tito	(red card) 90+6'
DF	4	(Brazil) Adriano Martins
DF	6	(Brazil) Guilherme Lopes
MF	5	(Brazil) Matheus Índio		(substituted off) 64'
MF	8	(Brazil) Igor Henrique (c)
MF	10	(Brazil) Guilherme Marques	(yellow card) 9'	(substituted off) 77'
FW	11	(Brazil) Jean Dias		(substituted off) 77'
FW	7	(Uruguay) Kevin Ramírez		(substituted off) 64'
FW	9	(Brazil) Léo Jacó
Substitutes:
GK	12	(Brazil) Vladimir
DF	13	(Brazil) Matheus Ribeiro		(substituted on) 77'
DF	14	(Paraguay) Junior Barreto
MF	15	(Brazil) Leandro Vilela		(substituted on) 64'
MF	16	(Brazil) Geovane
MF	17	(Portugal) Lima		(substituted on) 77'
FW	18	(Brazil) Ariel Palácio
FW	19	(Brazil) Bruno José		(substituted on) 57'
FW	20	(Brazil) Derek		(substituted on) 64'
Coach:
(Brazil) Eduardo Souza

Assistant referees:
Rodrigo Figueiredo Henrique Corrêa (Rio de Janeiro)
Alex Ang Ribeiro (São Paulo)
Fourth official:
Maguielson Lima Barbosa (Distrito Federal)
Fifth official:
Lucas Costa Modesto (Distrito Federal)
Video assistant referee:
Daniel Nobre Bins (Rio Grande do Sul)
Assistant video assistant referees:
Andrea Izaura Maffra Marcelino (Rio de Janeiro)
