= 2026 Goiás Esporte Clube season =

Goiás
2026 season
- Manager: Daniel Paulista
- Stadium: Estádio da Serrinha
- Campeonato Brasileiro Série B: 5th
- Campeonato Goiano: Champions
- Copa do Brasil: Fifth round

In the 2026 season, Goiás Esporte Clube is competing in the Campeonato Goiano, the Copa do Brasil, and the Campeonato Brasileiro Série B, in the sequence of commencement. In the Campeonato Goiano, the club secured the title with a 2–0 aggregate victory over Atlético Goianiense, ending an eight-year title drought.

== Transfers ==
=== In ===
Pos.	Player	Transferred from	Fee	Date	Source
FW	(Brazil) Bruno Sávio	(Colombia) Millonarios		24 December 2025	
MF	(Brazil) Djalma Silva	Unattached		17 January 2026	
DF	(Brazil) Ramon Menezes	(Brazil) Sport Recife	Loan	30 March 2026	

== Competitions ==
=== Overall record ===
Competition	First match	Last match	Starting round	Final position	Record							
Competition	First match	Last match	Starting round	Final position	Pld	W	D	L	GF	GA	GD	Win %
Campeonato Brasileiro Série B	22 March 2026		Matchday 1		9	4	1	4	9	12	−3	44.44
Campeonato Goiano	11 January 2026	15 March 2026	First phase	Winners	13	8	5	0	23	5	+18	61.54
Copa do Brasil	25 February 2026		Second round		4	2	2	0	8	4	+4	50.00
Total					26	14	8	4	40	21	+19	53.85

Last updated: 16 May 2026
Source: Competitions

=== Campeonato Brasileiro Série B ===
Pos	Team	Pld	W	D	L	GF	GA	GD	Pts	Promotion or relegation
5	Vila Nova	9	4	4	1	14	10	+4	16	Advance to the promotion play-offs
6	Novorizontino	10	4	4	2	13	10	+3	16	Advance to the promotion play-offs
7	Goiás	9	4	1	4	9	12	−3	13	
8	Criciúma	9	3	4	2	10	8	+2	13	
9	Ceará	10	3	4	3	11	11	0	13	

Updated to match(es) played on 23 May 2026. Source: CBF
Rules for classification: 1) points; 2) wins; 3) goal difference; 4) goals scored; 5) head-to-head results (only between 2 teams); 6) fewest red cards; 7) fewest yellow cards; 8) drawing of lots.

==== Results by round ====
Round	1	2	3	4	5	6	7	8	9	10
Ground	H	A	H	A	H	A	A	H	H	A
Result	W	D	W	L	L	L	L	W	W	
Position										

Updated to match(es) played on 16 May 2026. Source:
A = Away; H = Home; W = Win; D = Draw; L = Loss

==== Matches ====
On February 6, the CPF announced the match schedule.

22 March 2026 1	Goiás	3–1	América Mineiro	Goiânia
18:00				Stadium: Estádio da Serrinha

1 April 2026 2	Londrina	2–2	Goiás
19:00

6 April 2026 3	Goiás	1–0	Criciúma	Goiânia
21:00				Stadium: Estádio da Serrinha

11 April 2026 4	Juventude	2–0	Goiás
16:00

19 April 2026 5	Goiás	0–2	Cuiabá	Goiânia
18:00				Stadium: Estádio da Serrinha

26 April 2026 6	São Bernardo	1–0	Goiás	São Bernardo do Campo
16:00	Felipe Garcia 90+2'

2 May 2026 7	Fortaleza	4–1	Goiás	Fortaleza
20:30				Stadium: Arena Castelão

9 May 2026 8	Goiás	1–0	Vila Nova	Goiânia
16:00	Anselmo Ramon 79'			Stadium: Estádio da Serrinha; Referee: Flávio Rodrigues de Souza

16 May 2026 9	Goiás	1–0	Botafogo-SP	Goiânia
18:30	Kadu 73'			Stadium: Estádio da Serrinha; Referee: Dênis Ribeiro Serafim

24 May 2026 10	Avaí	v	Goiás	Florianópolis
19:00				Stadium: Estádio da Ressacada; Referee: João Vitor Gobi

=== Campeonato Goiano ===
11 January 2026 1	Goiás	4–0	Goiatuba
16:00

15 January 2026 2	CRAC	0–0	Goiás
19:30

18 January 2026 3	Atlético Goianiense	1–1	Goiás
16:00

22 January 2026 4	Goiás	4–0	Centro Oeste
16:00

24 January 2026 5	Anapolina	0–2	Goiás
19:00

29 January 2026 6	Goiás	1–0	ABECAT
19:30

29 January 2026 7	Goiás	1–0	Vila Nova
18:30

7 February 2026 8	Anapolina	0–1	Goiás
16:00

==== Quarter-finals ====
11 February 2026 First leg	CRAC	1–1	Goiás
19:30

14 February 2026 Second leg	Goiás	4–1 (5–2 agg.)	CRAC
17:00

==== Semi-finals ====
21 February 2026 First leg	Anapolina	2–2	Goiás
17:00

28 February 2026 Second leg	Goiás	1–1 (3–3 agg.) (4–3 p)	Anapolina
16:00

==== Finals ====
7 March 2026 First leg	Atlético Goianiense	0–2	Goiás
16:00

15 March 2026 Second leg	Goiás	0–0 (2–0 agg.)	Atlético Goianiense
16:00

=== Copa do Brasil ===
==== Second round ====
25 February 2026	Gama	2–2 (4–5 p)	Goiás
20:00

==== Third round ====
11 March 2026	Goiás	3–0	Fluminense-PI
19:30

==== Fourth round ====
19 March 2026	Maringá	0–1	Goiás
19:30

==== Fifth round ====
22 April 2026 First leg	Goiás	2–2	Cruzeiro	Goiânia
19:00	Nicolas 11'; García 90+6'		Arroyo 18'; Jonathan 76'	Stadium: Estádio da Serrinha; Referee: Davi de Oliveira Lacerda

12 May 2026 Second leg	Cruzeiro	1–0 (3–2 agg.)	Goiás	Belo Horizonte
21:30				Stadium: Mineirão
