= 2025 Clube de Regatas Brasil season =

Clube de Regatas Brasil
2025 season
- Manager: Eduardo Barroca
- Stadium: Estádio Rei Pelé
- Série B: 6th
- Campeonato Alagoano: Champions (35th title)
- Copa do Brasil: Third round
- Copa do Nordeste: Group stage

The 2025 season is the 113th year of Clube de Regatas Brasil. The team is set to compete in the Campeonato Brasileiro Série B for the fourteenth consecutive season, the Campeonato Alagoano, and the Copa do Brasil.

== Squad ==
=== Transfers Out ===
Pos.	Player	Transferred to	Fee	Date	Source
DF	(Brazil) Matheus Mega	(Brazil) Athletic Club	Loan	9 January 2025	

== Competitions ==
=== Overall record ===
Competition	First match	Last match	Starting round	Final position	Record							
Competition	First match	Last match	Starting round	Final position	Pld	W	D	L	GF	GA	GD	Win %
Série B	5 April 2025	22 November 2025	Matchday 1		2	2	0	0	3	1	+2	100.00
Campeonato Alagoano	16 January 2025		First stage	Winners	11	6	4	1	26	10	+16	54.55
Copa do Brasil	1 May 2025		Third round		2	0	2	0	1	1	+0	0.00
Copa do Nordeste	22 January 2025	26 March 2025	Group stage	5th	7	2	3	2	12	10	+2	28.57
Total					22	10	9	3	42	22	+20	45.45

Last updated: 13 April 2025
Source: Competitions

=== Série B ===
==== League table ====
Pos	Team	Pld	W	D	L	GF	GA	GD	Pts
6	Goiás	38	17	10	11	42	37	+5	61
7	Novorizontino	38	15	15	8	43	32	+11	60
8	CRB	38	16	8	14	45	40	+5	56
9	Avaí	38	14	14	10	50	40	+10	56
10	Cuiabá	38	14	12	12	43	44	−1	54

Source: CBF
Rules for classification: 1) points; 2) wins; 3) goal difference; 4) goals scored; 5) head-to-head results (only between 2 teams); 6) fewest red cards; 7) fewest yellow cards; 8) drawing of lots.

==== Matches ====
5 April 2025 1	CRB	1–0	Chapecoense	Maceió
16:00 (UTC-3)	David 9'			Stadium: Estádio Rei Pelé

13 April 2025 2	Athletic Club	1–2	CRB	Belo Horizonte
16:00 UTC−3	Lincoln 29'	Report	Gegê 52'; Douglas Baggio 90+1'	Stadium: Arena Independência; Referee: Fernando Mendes

26 July 2025 19	CRB	4–0	Novorizontino

3 August 2025 20	Chapecoense	3–2	CRB

12 August 2025 21	CRB	1–0	Athletic Club

18 August 2025 22	Volta Redonda	0–1	CRB

=== Campeonato Alagoano ===
==== Results by round ====
Round	1	2
Ground	A	A
Result	D	
Position		

Updated to match(es) played on 16 January 2025. Source:
A = Away; H = Home; W = Win; D = Draw; L = Loss

==== Group stage ====
16 January 2025 1	ASA	0–0	CRB
20:00 UTC−3

19 January 2025 2	CSE	1–5	CRB
16:00 UTC−3

==== Semi-finals ====
15 February 2025 First Leg	CRB	2–0	Penedense	Maceió
16:00 UTC−3	Luis 54'; Anselmo Ramon 61'			Stadium: Estádio Rei Pelé; Attendance: 4,267; Referee: Marcio dos Santos Oliveira

22 February 2025 Second Leg	Penedense	1–3 (1–5 agg.)	CRB	Penedo
16:00 UTC−3	Matheus Vitor 75'		Matheus Vitor 1' (o.g.); Danielzinho 90'; David 90+4'	Stadium: Estádio Alfredo Leahy; Attendance: 2,026; Referee: José Ricardo Vasconcellos Laranjeira

==== Finals ====
8 March 2025 First Leg	ASA	2–2	CRB	Arapiraca
16:00 UTC−3	Júnior Viçosa 18'; Thiago Alagoano 61'		Sousa Tibiri 61' (o.g.); Thiaguinho 74'	Stadium: Fumeirão; Attendance: 6,527; Referee: Rafael Carlos Salgueiro Lima

15 March 2025 Second Leg	CRB	2–1 (4–3 agg.)	ASA	Maceió
16:00 UTC−3	Higor Meritão 90+11'; Anselmo Ramon 90+16'		Júnior Viçosa 63'	Stadium: Estádio Rei Pelé; Attendance: 13,270; Referee: Marcio dos Santos Oliveira

=== Copa do Brasil ===
==== Third round ====
1 May First leg	Santos	1–1	CRB	Santos
18:00 UTC-03:00	Rollheiser 45'	Report	Breno 57'	Stadium: Vila Belmiro; Referee: Lucas Paulo Torezin

22 May Second leg	CRB	0–0 (1–1 agg.) (5–4 p)	Santos	Maceió
21:30 UTC-03:00		Report		Stadium: Estádio Rei Pelé

=== Copa do Nordeste ===
==== Group stage ====
Pos	Team	Pld	W	D	L	GF	GA	GD	Pts	Qualification
3	(Ceará) Ferroviário	7	3	1	3	8	10	−2	10	Advance to Quarter-finals
4	(Ceará) Fortaleza	7	3	0	4	11	7	+4	9	Advance to Quarter-finals
5	(Alagoas) CRB	7	2	3	2	12	10	+2	9	
6	(Piauí) Altos	7	2	3	2	7	7	0	9	
7	(Maranhão) Moto Club	7	1	4	2	8	13	−5	7	

Source: CBF

22 January 2025 1	CRB	2–2	Vitória	Maceió
21:30 (UTC-3)				Stadium: Estádio Rei Pelé; Attendance: 3,862; Referee: Fabio Augusto Santos Sá Junior

5 February 2025 2	Altos	1–1	CRB	Teresina
21:30 (UTC-3)	Lucas Reis 70'	Report	Mateus Pureza 84'	Stadium: Albertão

11 February 2025 3	CRB	2–2	Moto Club	Maceió
19:00 (UTC-3)	Anselmo Ramon 22'; Vinícius Barata 75'	Report	Danilinho 5'; Luís Gustavo 82'	Stadium: Estádio Rei Pelé

19 February 2025 4	CRB	4–1	Sousa	Maceió
19:00 (UTC-3)	Gegê 17'; Willian Bahia 37'; Nathan Melo 58'; Miranda 86'	Report	Uesles Moura 62'	Stadium: Estádio Rei Pelé; Referee: Paulo Jose Souza Mourão

5 March 2025 5	Sport	2–1	CRB	Recife
21:30 (UTC-3)	Lenny Lobato 30'; Oliveira 38'	Report	Anselmo Ramon 33'	Stadium: Estádio Adelmar da Costa Carvalho (Ilha do Retiro); Attendance: 8,432; Referee: Leonilson Fernandes Trigueiro Filho

21 March 2025 6	CRB	1–2	Ferroviário	Maceió
21:30 (UTC-3)	Thiaguinho 90+2'	Report	Ciel 21', 66'	Stadium: Estádio Rei Pelé; Referee: Jose Woshington da Silva

26 March 2025 7	Fortaleza	0–1	CRB	Fortaleza
(UTC-3)			Ramon 45+2'	Stadium: Castelão
