= Márcio Goiano =

Brazilian footballer

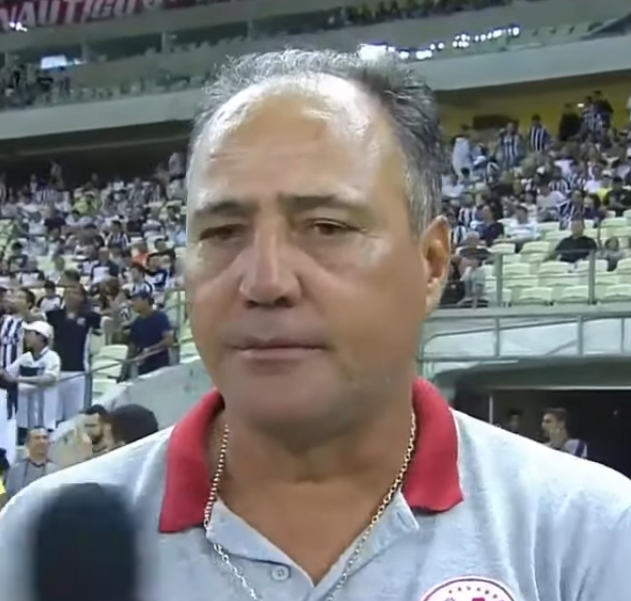
- Márcio Goiano in 2019

Personal information
- Full name: Márcio de Azevedo
- Date of birth: 23 September 1969 (age 57)
- Place of birth: Goiânia, Brazil
- Height: 1.82 m (6 ft 0 in)
- Position: Centre-back

Youth career
- Goiás

Senior career*
Years	Team	Apps	(Gls)
1990–1991	Goiás		
1992–1993	Inhumas		
1993–1996	Goiás		
1997–1999	Sport Recife		
2000	Atlético Mineiro	11	(1)
2001	Portuguesa Santista	12	(0)
2001	Portuguesa		
2002–2004	Figueirense		
2005	Fortaleza		
2006	Avaí		

Managerial career
- 2008–2009: Goiás (youth)
- 2010: Figueirense (assistant)
- 2010–2011: Figueirense
- 2011: Grêmio Prudente
- 2011: São Caetano
- 2011: Goiás
- 2011–2012: Criciúma
- 2012: Red Bull Brasil
- 2012: ABC
- 2012: Figueirense
- 2013: CRB
- 2014: Mogi Mirim
- 2014: Vila Nova
- 2014: Cuiabá
- 2015: Aparecidense
- 2015: Mogi Mirim
- 2016: Aparecidense
- 2017: Figueirense
- 2018: Aparecidense
- 2018–2019: Náutico
- 2020: River
- 2022: Jataiense
- 2023: Central
- 2023–2024: Goiatuba
- 2024: Centro Oeste
- 2025: Goianésia
- 2026: Sport Recife (assistant)
- 2026: Sport Recife (interim)
- 2026: Sport Recife
- * Club domestic league appearances and goals

Márcio de Azevedo (born 23 September 1969), known as Márcio Goiano, is a Brazilian football coach and former player who played as a centre-back.

== Playing career ==
Born in Goiânia, Goiás (which granted him the nickname of Goiano), Márcio began his career with Goiás in 1990. Rarely used, he moved to Inhumas in 1992, before returning to his previous club in the following year.

Ahead of the 1997 season, Márcio Goiano joined Sport Recife, and helped the club to win three consecutive Campeonato Pernambucano titles. He signed for Atlético Mineiro in 2000, also winning the state league in that year.

In 2002, after short spells at Portuguesa Santista and Portuguesa, Márcio Goiano joined Figueirense. He was a team captain at the latter, also lifting three Campeonato Catarinense consecutive titles.

In 2006, after playing for Fortaleza and Avaí, Márcio Goiano retired at the age of 37.

== Coaching career ==
After retiring, Márcio Goiano worked in the youth categories of his first club Goiás, before returning to Figueirense on 21 December 2009, as an assistant coach. He was appointed interim head coach on 1 February 2010, replacing sacked Renê Weber, before being permanently named head coach nine days later.

Márcio Goiano led Figueira to a promotion to the Série A in that season, but was dismissed on 28 February 2011. On 24 March, he took over Grêmio Prudente, but left the club in May after their change of ownership.

Shortly after leaving Prudente, Márcio Goiano was announced as head coach of São Caetano on 12 May 2011, but resigned on 4 July, amidst rumours of a possible return to Goiás. The move was confirmed two days later, but he only lasted 11 matches before being sacked on 5 September.

On 19 September 2011, Márcio Goiano was named Criciúma head coach. Sacked the following 14 February, he spent seven matches in charge of Red Bull Brasil before being appointed at the helm of ABC on 9 May 2012.

Dismissed from ABC after eight matches on 4 July 2012, Márcio Goiano returned to Figueirense on 28 August, but was also sacked on 5 November. On 5 June 2013, he was presented as head coach of CRB, but left by mutual consent on 26 July.

On 28 February 2014, Márcio Goiano replaced Ailton Silva at the helm of Mogi Mirim. After managing to avoid relegation from the 2014 Campeonato Paulista, he led the club to the first position in the 2014 Série C, but was sacked after on 2 June, after a loss to Caxias which ended the club's unbeaten status in the competition.

On 14 June 2014, Márcio Goiano returned to his native state after being confirmed as head coach of Vila Nova. Sacked on 13 September after four consecutive losses, he took over Cuiabá two days later, leaving the latter by mutual consent on 8 October.

Márcio Goiano led Aparecidense in the 2015 Campeonato Goiano, and returned to Mogi in September, where he lost all five matches in charge before resigning on 28 October. He returned to his previous club on 3 December, but was sacked the following July.

On 16 February 2017, Márcio Goiano returned to Figueirense for his third spell as head coach. He was sacked on 14 June, after only four wins in 21 matches, and returned to Aparecidense – also for his third spell – in November.

Márcio Goiano left the Camaleão on 10 April 2018, after reaching the finals of the year's Goianão, and took over Náutico on 20 May. He renewed his contract for a further year on 29 August, but was dismissed on 12 May 2019.

On 22 October 2019, Márcio Goiano was announced as head coach of River for the upcoming season, but was sacked the following 30 January, after four winless matches. On 13 October 2021, after nearly two years without a club, he agreed to become Jataiense's head coach for the ensuing campaign, but was also dismissed the following 18 February.

On 7 February 2023, Central announced Márcio Goiano as head coach. He took over Goiatuba on 8 July, and won the year's Campeonato Goiano Segunda Divisão with the club.

On 14 March 2024, Márcio Goiano was announced as head coach of Centro Oeste, also for the second division of the state league. He narrowly missed out promotion with the side, and took over Goianésia on 20 January 2025.

On 3 January 2026, Márcio Goiano returned to another club he represented as a player, Sport, as an assistant coach. He was named interim head coach on 23 March, replacing sacked Roger Silva, before being confirmed on the role on 16 April.

On 29 June 2026, Márcio Goiano was sacked by Sport after four winless matches.

== Honours ==
=== Player ===
Goiás

- Campeonato Goiano: 1994, 1996

Sport

- Campeonato Pernambucano: 1997, 1998, 1999

Figueirense

- Campeonato Catarinense: 2002, 2003, 2004

Fortaleza

- Campeonato Cearense: 2005

=== Coach ===
Goiatuba

- Campeonato Goiano Segunda Divisão: 2023
