= Kadu Sousa =

Brazilian footballer

Personal information
- Full name: Carlos Eduardo de Sousa Leopoldino
- Date of birth: 3 March 2002 (age 24)
- Place of birth: Curitiba, Brazil
- Height: 1.81 m (5 ft 11 in)
- Position: Forward

Team information
- Current team: Goiás
- Number: 40

Youth career
- São Joseense

Senior career*
Years	Team	Apps	(Gls)
2023	Široki Brijeg	4	(0)
2024–2026	Paranavaí	6	(0)
2024	→ Rio Verde (loan)	12	(8)
2025	→ Anápolis (loan)	28	(4)
2026	→ Goiás (loan)	15	(6)
2026–	Goiás	12	(5)
- * Club domestic league appearances and goals as of 17 November 2026

Carlos Eduardo de Sousa Leopoldino (born 3 March 2003), known as Kadu Sousa or just Kadu, is a Brazilian footballer who plays as a forward for Goiás.

== Career ==
Born in Curitiba, Paraná, Kadu played in amateur leagues of his native state before joining the youth categories of São Joseense after a trial period. In 2023, he moved to Bosnia and Herzegovina to join Široki Brijeg, but was subsequently released after just four matches.

Back to Brazil, Kadu spent nearly a year without a club, working as a bricklayer or in a snack factory before joining Paranavaí in May 2024. Despite being sparingly used, he moved to Rio Verde on loan on 26 July, and helped the club to win the Campeonato Goiano Terceira Divisão by scoring eight goals in 12 matches, being also the top scorer of the competition.

On 27 November 2024, Kadu was announced at Anápolis. Regularly used, he left the club on 5 November of the following year, and joined Goiás eight days later, still owned by Paranavaí.

Initially a backup option with only two matches in the 2026 Campeonato Goiano, Kadu scored his first goal for the Esmeraldino on 16 May of that year, netting the winner in a 1–0 home success over Botafogo-SP. He established himself as a starter in July, scoring four goals in four matches during the month, before signing a permanent deal with the club until 2029 on 20 August, for a rumoured fee of R$ 600,000 for 60% of his economic rights.

== Career statistics ==
As of 30 October 2026

Club	Season	League			State League		Cup		Continental		Other		Total	
Club	Season	Division	Apps	Goals	Apps	Goals	Apps	Goals	Apps	Goals	Apps	Goals	Apps	Goals
Široki Brijeg	2022–23	Premijer liga	4	0	—		—		—		—		4	0
Paranavaí	2024	Paranaense 2ª Divisão	—		6	0	—		—		—		6	0
Rio Verde (loan)	2024	Goiano 3ª Divisão	—		12	8	—		—		—		12	8
Anápolis (loan)	2025	Série C	11	3	17	1	—		—		—		28	4
Goiás	2026	Série B	24	11	2	0	1	0	—		—		27	11
Career total			39	14	37	9	1	0	0	0	0	0	77	23

== Honours ==
Rio Verde

- Campeonato Goiano Terceira Divisão: 2024

Goiás

- Campeonato Goiano: 2026
