= Jean Carlos =

Jean Carlos may refer to:

- Jean Carlos (footballer, born 1974), full name Jean Carlos da Conceição, Brazilian football forward
- Jean Carlos (footballer, born 1980), full name Jean Carlos Macedo da Silva, Brazilian football midfielder
- Jean Carlos (footballer, born 1982), full name Jean Carlos da Silva Ferreira, Brazilian football forward
- Jean Carlos (footballer, born 1983), full name Jean Carlos Dondé, Brazilian football defender
- Jean Carlos (footballer, born 1984), full name Jean Carlos Sales Bemvindo, Brazilian football striker
- Jean Carlos (footballer, born 1992), full name Jean Carlos Vicente, Brazilian football midfielder
- Jean Carlos (footballer, born 1996), full name Jean Carlos Silva Rocha, Brazilian football winger
- Jean Carlos (footballer, born 2005), full name Jean Carlos Alves Ferreira, Brazilian football midfielder
- Jean Carlos Centeno (born 1976), Colombian-Venezuelan singer
- Jean Carlos López (born 1992), Dominican Republic football midfielder
- Jean Carlos Prada (born 1984), Venezuelan boxer
- Jean Carlos Solórzano (born 1988), Costa Rican football forward
