= Lucas Rodrigues =

Lucas Rodrigues may refer to:

- Lucas Rodrigues (footballer, born 1999), Brazilian footballer
- Lucas Rodrigues (footballer, born 2007), Brazilian footballer
