= Lucas Lima (footballer, born 1990) =

Brazilian footballer

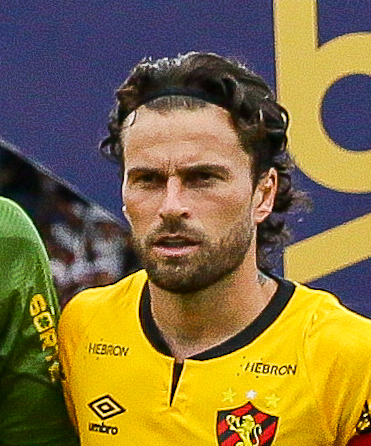
- Lucas Lima in 2025

Personal information
- Full name: Lucas Rafael Araújo Lima
- Date of birth: 9 July 1990 (age 36)
- Place of birth: Marília, Brazil
- Height: 1.75 m (5 ft 9 in)
- Position: Attacking midfielder

Team information
- Current team: Goiás
- Number: 10

Youth career
- 2008: Rio Preto
- 2009: América-SP
- 2009–2010: Inter de Limeira

Senior career*
Years	Team	Apps	(Gls)
2010–2012	Inter de Limeira	64	(9)
2012–2013	Internacional	16	(0)
2013	→ Sport Recife (loan)	46	(9)
2014–2017	Santos	163	(16)
2018–2022	Palmeiras	136	(11)
2021–2022	→ Fortaleza (loan)	45	(1)
2023–2024	Santos	39	(1)
2024	→ Sport Recife (loan)	41	(3)
2025	Sport Recife	40	(4)
2026–	Goiás	38	(0)

International career^{‡}
2015–2017	Brazil	14	(2)
- * Club domestic league appearances and goals as of 16 November 2026 ‡ National team caps and goals as of 25 January 2017

Lucas Rafael Araújo Lima (born 9 July 1990) is a Brazilian professional footballer who plays as an attacking midfielder for Goiás.

== Club career ==
=== Inter de Limeira ===
Born in Marília, São Paulo, Lucas Lima finished his formation with Inter de Limeira, joining their youth setup in 2009, after being released by Rio Preto and América-SP. He was promoted to the former's main squad in 2010.

Lucas Lima made his senior debut on 16 May 2010, starting in a 2–1 home win against Brasilis. He scored his first senior goal on 30 May 2010, netting the second in a 3–0 away win against Palmeirinha.

In August 2011 Lucas Lima had a trial at La Liga side Racing de Santander, but nothing came of it.

=== Internacional ===
In July 2012, Lucas Lima joined SC Internacional, initially assigned with the under-23 squad. After being promoted to the first team, he made his debut for Colorado on 15 July, starting in a 0–0 home draw against Santos FC. He appeared in 14 matches during the season, with only four starts, however.

==== Loan to Sport Recife ====
On 5 March 2013, Lucas Lima joined Sport Recife on loan until the end of the season. He soon established himself as a starter, and appeared in 46 matches (36 in the league), scoring nine times.

=== Santos ===
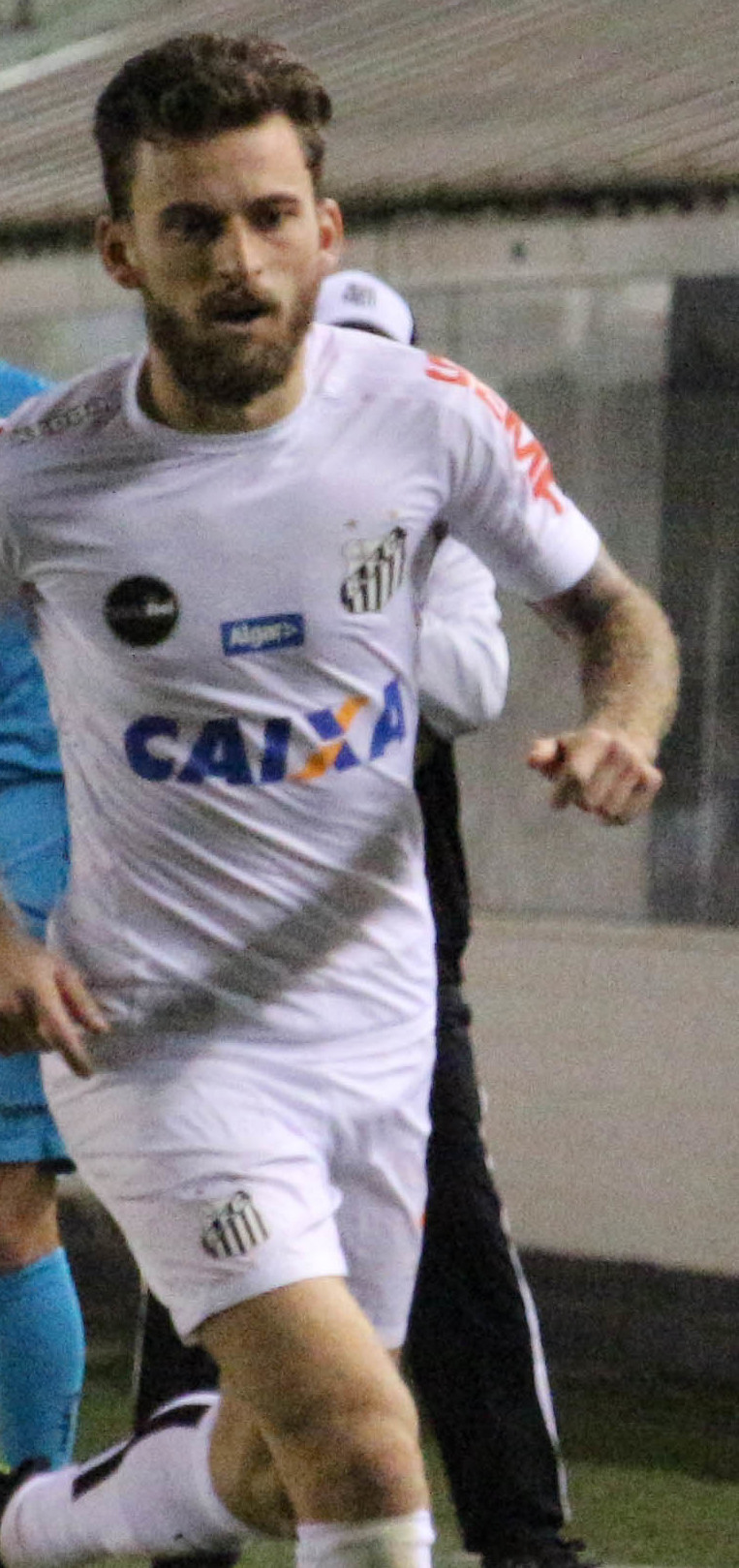
Lucas Lima in action for Santos in 2017

On 7 February 2014, Lucas Lima signed a four-year deal with Santos, for a R$5 million fee. He made his debut for the club late in the month, in a 5–0 home routing over Bragantino, and scored his first goal on 7 March, in a 5–2 away success against Mogi Mirim.

After the departure of Cícero to Fluminense, Lucas Lima became the club's first-choice, and scored his first Série A goal on 29 May, in a 2–0 away win against Bahia. He finished the campaign with 35 league appearances and three goals, being now a key unit for the club.

Lucas Lima scored the decisive penalty for Santos in 2015 Campeonato Paulista final, netting the fourth in a 4–2 shootout win over Palmeiras. He was also included in the tournament's best eleven. He completed his 100th game for the club on 18 October of that year, starting in a 3–1 home win against Goiás, and finished the year with four league goals in 30 appearances.

Lucas Lima failed to maintain the high standards of the previous campaign during the 2016 season; hampered by injuries in the year's Paulistão (in which he was still elected Best player), the constant call ups to the national team also impeded his recovery at the club. He still scored a direct free kick in a 3–0 home win against rivals São Paulo on 26 June.

After the departure of Gabriel to Internazionale, Lucas Lima was assigned the number 10 jersey. He made his Copa Libertadores debut on 9 March 2017, starting and assisting Thiago Maia's goal in a 1–1 away draw against Sporting Cristal; he was also elected the Man of the match.

Despite playing regularly during the year, Lucas Lima only scored one league goal during the campaign (in a 2–0 home win against rivals Corinthians); he was also the player with the highest number of bookable offences during the competition. After refusing the renewal offer from the club, he was separated from the first team on 21 November 2017.

=== Palmeiras ===
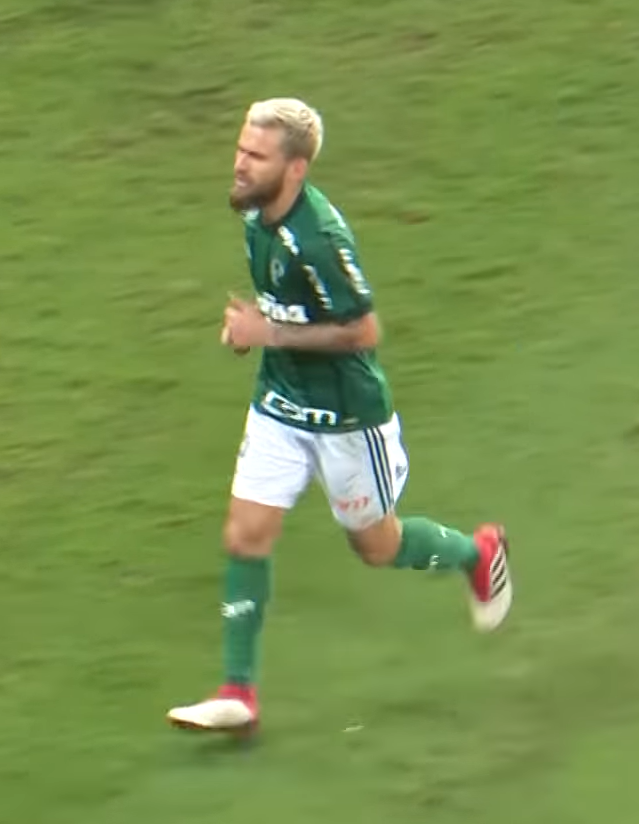
Lucas Lima with Palmeiras in 2018

On 30 November 2017, Lucas Lima signed a pre-contract with Santos' rival Palmeiras, effective as of 1 January. He was regularly used during the 2018 and 2019 seasons, scoring six goals in 2018.

On 18 April 2021, after losing space after the arrival of manager Abel Ferreira, Lucas Lima's manager Alessio Sundas, announced that the player was on its way to Inter Miami, David Beckham's team playing in the America's Major League Soccer, but nothing came of it.

==== Loan to Fortaleza ====
On 25 August 2021, Lucas Lima was loaned to fellow top tier side Fortaleza until the end of the year. The following 12 January, his loan was extended for a further season, meaning that he would not return to Palmeiras as his contract would expire at the end of the year.

=== Return to Santos ===
On 7 February 2023, Lucas Lima returned to Santos on a contract until the end of the 2023 Campeonato Paulista. He made his re-debut for the club nine days later, starting in a 1–1 Campeonato Paulista away draw against Santo André.

On 1 May 2023, after establishing himself as a regular starter, Lucas Lima renewed with Peixe until April 2025.

=== Return to Sport Recife ===
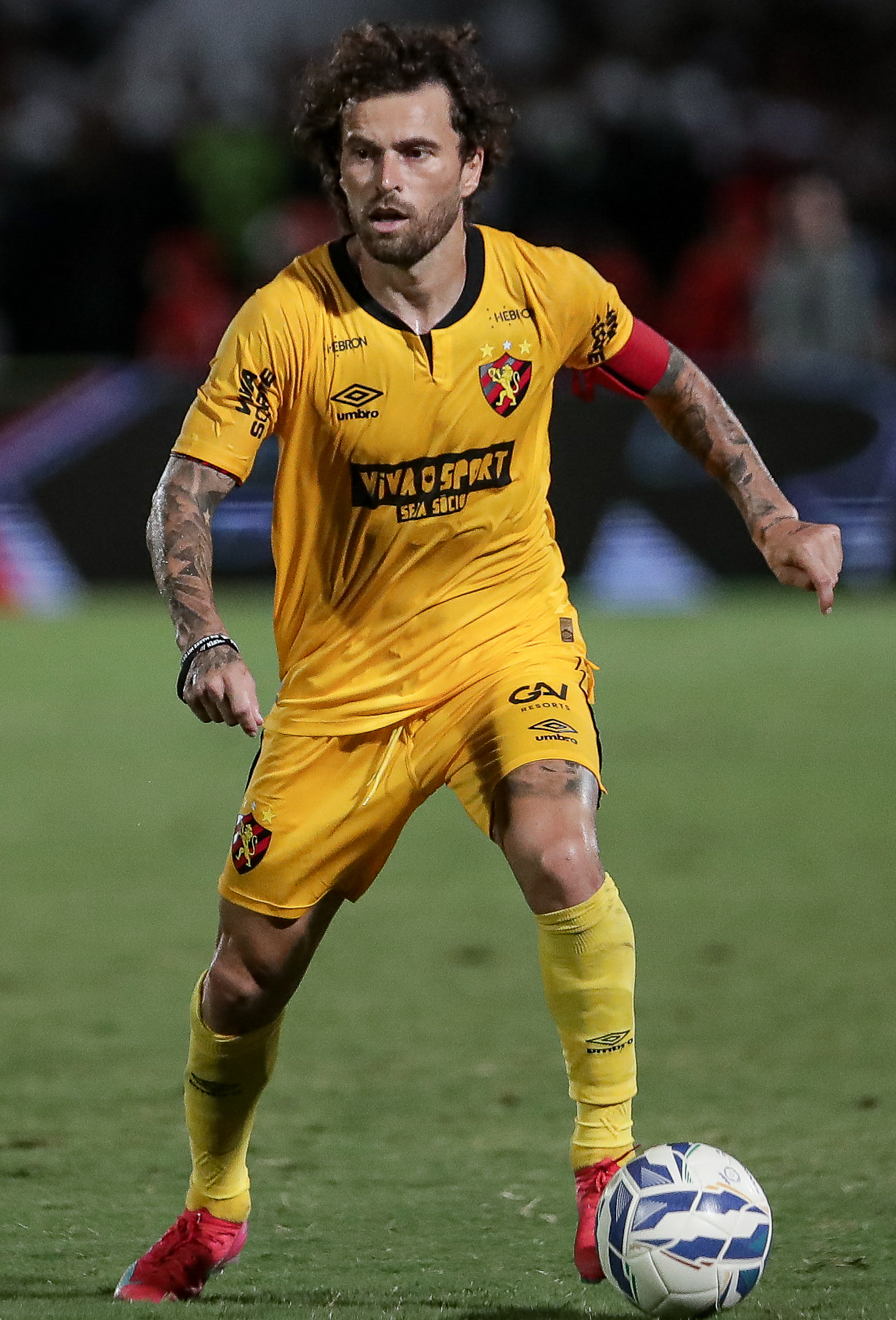
Lucas Lima playing for Sport Recife in 2025

On 1 February 2024, Santos announced the loan of Lucas Lima to Sport for the 2024 season. He was a regular starter for the club during the year, notably scoring a brace in the last fixture against former club Santos (2–1 home win), which ensured Sport's promotion to the top tier.

On 15 January 2025, Lucas Lima officially rescinded his link with Santos, and signed a definitive contract with Sport until December 2026.

== International career ==
On 13 August 2015, Lucas Lima was called up to Brazil national team by manager Dunga for friendlies against Costa Rica and United States. He made his full international debut for Brazil on 5 September, starting in a 1–0 win against Costa Rica at the Red Bull Arena in Harrison, New Jersey.

Lucas Lima scored his first goal for Brazil in the 2018 FIFA World Cup qualifiers against Argentina, securing a 1–1 tie. On 5 May 2016, he was named among the 23-man list for the Copa América Centenario to be held in the United States. He came off the bench in matches against Ecuador and Haiti, scoring the fifth goal in the 7–1 routing of the latter, and started the last match of the group stage, a 0–1 loss (and eventual elimination) against Peru.

== Career statistics ==
=== Club ===
As of match played 11 October 2026

Appearances and goals by club, season and competition
Club	Season	League			State League		Cup		Continental		Other		Total	
Club	Season	Division	Apps	Goals	Apps	Goals	Apps	Goals	Apps	Goals	Apps	Goals	Apps	Goals
Inter de Limeira	2010	Paulista 2ª Divisão	—		27	6	—		—		—		27	6
Inter de Limeira	2011	Paulista A3	—		14	2	—		—		7 (Note: Appearance(s) in Copa Paulista)	1	21	3
Inter de Limeira	2012	Paulista A3	—		23	1	—		—		—		23	1
Inter de Limeira	Total		—		64	9	—		—		7	1	71	10
Internacional	2012	Série A	14	0	—		—		—		—		14	0
Internacional	2013	Série A	—		2	0	—		—		—		2	0
Internacional	Total		14	0	2	0	—		—		—		16	0
Sport Recife (loan)	2013	Série B	36	7	10	2	4	0	3 (Note: Appearance(s) in Copa Sudamericana)	0	—		53	9
Santos	2014	Série A	35	3	4	1	10	1	—		—		49	5
Santos	2015	Série A	31	4	18	1	11	1	—		—		60	6
Santos	2016	Série A	25	2	17	2	5	1	—		—		47	5
Santos	2017	Série A	25	1	8	2	4	0	8 (Note: Appearance(s) in Copa Libertadores)	0	—		45	3
Santos	Total		116	10	47	6	30	3	8	0	—		201	19
Palmeiras	2018	Série A	34	5	16	1	3	0	7	1	—		60	7
Palmeiras	2019	Série A	23	1	13	0	4	0	3	0	—		43	1
Palmeiras	2020	Série A	32	1	13	1	5	0	4	0	0	0	54	2
Palmeiras	2021	Série A	0	0	5	2	2	0	1	0	0	0	8	2
Palmeiras	Total		89	7	47	4	14	0	15	1	0	0	165	12
Fortaleza (loan)	2021	Série A	17	1	—		—		—		—		17	1
Fortaleza (loan)	2022	Série A	22	0	6	0	4	0	8	0	11 (Note: Appearance(s) in Copa do Nordeste)	0	51	0
Fortaleza (loan)	Total		39	1	6	0	4	0	8	0	11	0	68	1
Santos	2023	Série A	35	1	4	0	6	1	5	0	—		50	2
Sport Recife (loan)	2024	Série B	35	3	6	0	4	0	—		8	1	53	4
Sport Recife	2025	Série A	33	4	8	1	0	0	—		7	0	48	5
Sport Recife	Total		68	7	14	1	4	0	—		15	1	101	9
Goiás	2026	Série B	29	0	5	0	5	1	—		—		39	1
Career total			426	33	199	22	67	5	39	1	33	2	764	63

=== International ===
Appearances and goals by national team and year
National team	Year	Apps	Goals
Brazil	2015	6	1
Brazil	2016	7	1
Brazil	2017	1	0
Total		14	2

Scores and results list Brazil's goal tally first, score column indicates score after each Lucas Lima goal.

List of international goals scored by Lucas Lima
No.	Date	Venue	Opponent	Score	Result	Competition
1	13 November 2015	Estadio Monumental, Buenos Aires, Argentina	Argentina	1–1	1–1	2018 FIFA World Cup qualification
2	8 June 2016	Camping World Stadium, Orlando, United States	Haiti	5–0	7–1	Copa América Centenario

== Honours ==
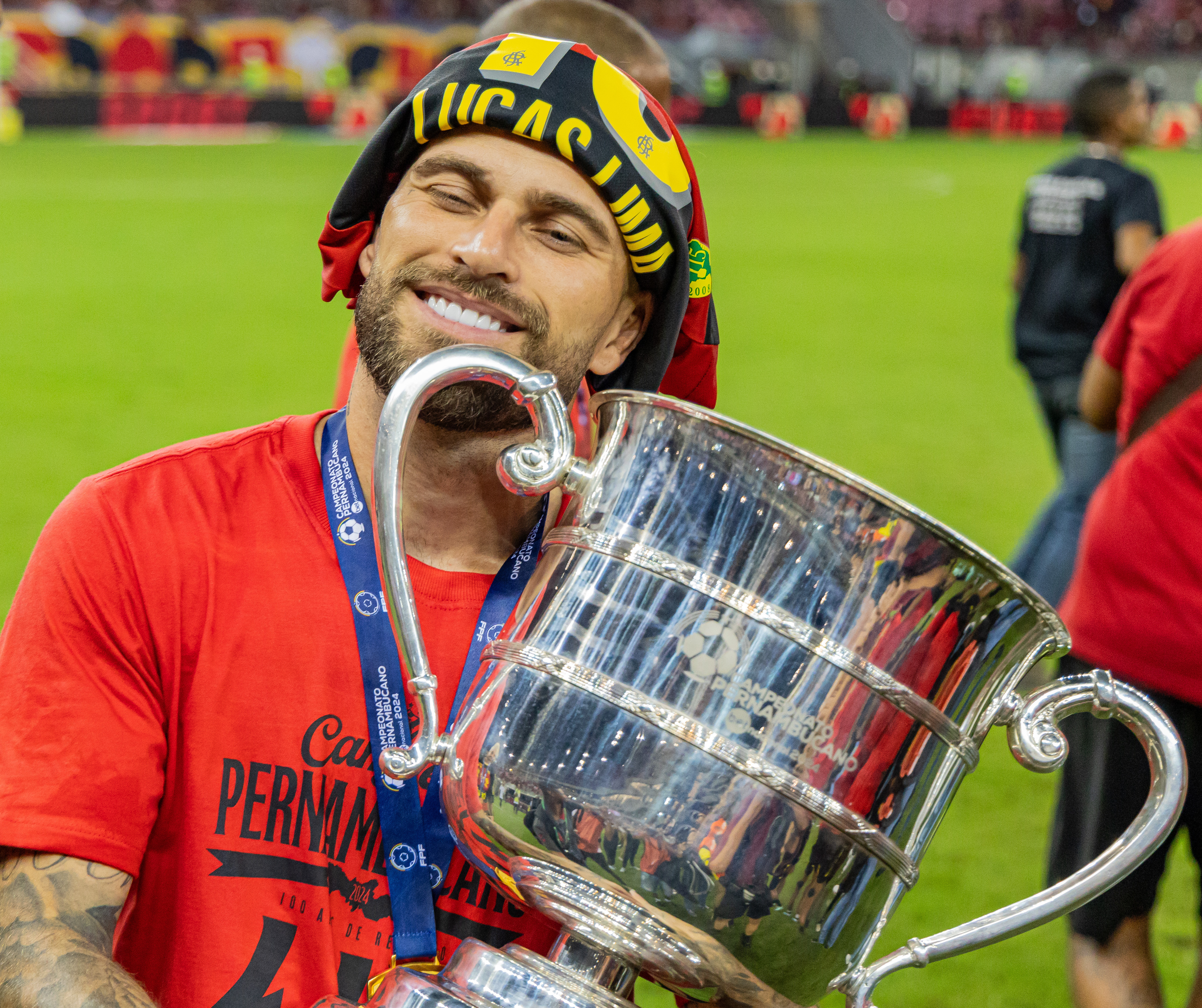
Lucas Lima with the Campeonato Pernambucano trophy in 2024

Santos

- Campeonato Paulista: 2015, 2016

Palmeiras

- Campeonato Brasileiro Série A: 2018
- Campeonato Paulista: 2020
- Copa Libertadores: 2020, 2021
- Copa do Brasil: 2020

Fortaleza

- Copa do Nordeste: 2022
- Campeonato Cearense: 2022

Sport Recife

- Campeonato Pernambucano: 2024, 2025

Goiás

- Campeonato Goiano: 2026

Individual

- Campeonato Pernambucano Best midfielder: 2013
- Campeonato Paulista Team of the Year: 2015, 2016, 2018
- Campeonato Paulista Best Player: 2016
- Copa Libertadores top assist provider: 2017
- Best Central midfielder in Brazil: 2015, 2018
- Best Right Winger in Brazil: 2016
