= Ariel Palácio =

Brazilian footballer (born 1998)

Ariel
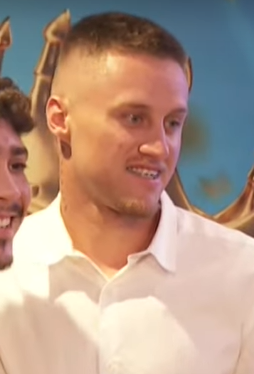
- Ariel in 2023

Personal information
- Full name: Ariel Felipe Gomes da Rosa
- Date of birth: 4 July 1998 (age 28)
- Place of birth: Erechim, Brazil
- Height: 1.78 m (5 ft 10 in)
- Position: Midfielder

Team information
- Current team: Brusque
- Number: 20

Youth career
- Machado
- SER Missões
- 2014–2015: Ypiranga-RS
- 2015–2016: Internacional
- 2016–2017: Lajeadense
- 2017: → Grêmio (loan)

Senior career*
Years	Team	Apps	(Gls)
2018–2023	Lajeadense	52	(18)
2020	→ São Luiz (loan)	7	(0)
2020	→ Juventude (loan)	0	(0)
2022	→ Anápolis (loan)	11	(3)
2022	→ Anápolis (loan)	3	(0)
2022	→ Marília (loan)	0	(0)
2023	→ Anápolis (loan)	14	(5)
2023	Goiás	0	(0)
2023	→ Londrina (loan)	16	(1)
2024	Santo André	6	(0)
2024	São José-RS	11	(0)
2024–2025	Anápolis	25	(4)
2025–2026	Atlético Goianiense	29	(0)
2026–	Brusque	12	(3)
- * Club domestic league appearances and goals as of 9 November 2026

Ariel Felipe Gomes da Rosa (born 4 July 1998), known as Ariel Felipe, Ariel Palácio or simply Ariel, is a Brazilian footballer who plays as a midfielder for Brusque.

== Club career ==
Ariel was born in Erechim, Rio Grande do Sul, and represented hometown sides before joining Internacional's youth categories in 2015. He left in 2016 and subsequently joined Lajeadense, but was loaned to Grêmio in February 2017.

Back to Lajeadense for the 2018 season, Ariel became a part of the first team, featuring regularly in the year's Campeonato Gaúcho Série A2. On 4 December 2019, he was announced at São Luiz on loan, but ended the 2020 at Juventude's under-23 squad, also in a temporary deal.

On 29 December 2021, Ariel was announced at Anápolis. He returned to Lajeadense for the 2022 Gaúcho Série A2, before rejoining Anápolis on 15 July, now for the Série D.

On 3 August 2022, still owned by Lajeadense, Ariel moved to Marília and reached the final of the year's Copa Paulista. Despite being included in MAC's squad for the 2023 campaign, he returned to Anápolis in January 2023 after activating a release clause.

On 30 March 2023, Ariel agreed to a contract with Série A side Goiás. He made his debut for the club five days later, coming on as a late substitute for Alesson in a 0–0 home draw against Independiente Santa Fe, for the year's Copa Sudamericana.

== Career statistics ==
As of 6 April 2023

Club	Season	League			State League		Cup		Continental		Other		Total	
Club	Season	Division	Apps	Goals	Apps	Goals	Apps	Goals	Apps	Goals	Apps	Goals	Apps	Goals
Lajeadense	2018	Gaúcho Série A2	—		10	0	—		—		5 (Note: Appearance(s) in Copa FGF)	0	15	0
Lajeadense	2019	Gaúcho Série A2	—		15	4	—		—		9	1	24	5
Lajeadense	2021	Gaúcho Série A2	—		14	7	—		—		—		14	7
Lajeadense	2022	Gaúcho Série A2	—		13	7	—		—		—		13	7
Lajeadense	Total		—		52	18	—		—		14	1	66	19
São Luiz (loan)	2020	Série D	1	0	6	0	0	0	—		—		7	0
Anápolis (loan)	2022	Série D	3	0	11	3	—		—		—		14	3
Marília (loan)	2022	Paulista A3	—		0	0	—		—		6 (Note: Appearance(s) in Copa Paulista)	1	6	1
Anápolis	2023	Série D	0	0	14	5	—		—		—		14	5
Goiás (loan)	2023	Série A	0	0	—		—		1 (Note: Appearance(s) in Copa Sudamericana)	0	—		1	0
Career total			4	0	83	26	0	0	1	0	20	2	108	28
