= Daniel Paulista =

Brazilian footballer and manager (born 1982)

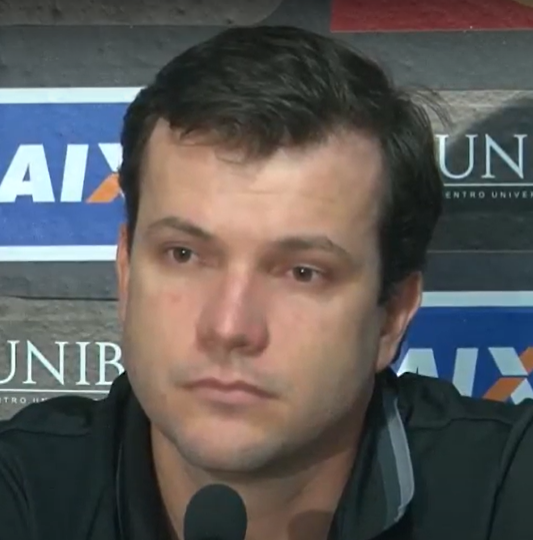
- Daniel Paulista in 2017

Personal information
- Full name: Daniel Pollo Baroni
- Date of birth: 5 May 1982 (age 44)
- Place of birth: Ribeirão Preto, Brazil
- Height: 1.79 m (5 ft 10 in)
- Position: Defensive midfielder

Youth career
- 2000–2001: Comercial-SP

Senior career*
Years	Team	Apps	(Gls)
2002	Comercial-SP	9	(2)
2003–2004	Santos	25	(1)
2005	Juventude	29	(1)
2006	Sertãozinho	0	(0)
2006	São Caetano	26	(0)
2007	Corinthians	0	(0)
2007	→ Náutico (loan)	29	(0)
2008	Sport Recife	17	(0)
2008	Rapid București	4	(0)
2009–2011	Sport Recife	46	(3)
2012	Botafogo-SP	7	(0)
2012	Comercial-SP	0	(0)
2013	Audax	23	(2)
2013–2014	ABC	18	(0)
Total		235	(9)

Managerial career
- 2014–2016: Sport Recife (assistant)
- 2015: Sport Recife (interim)
- 2016–2017: Sport Recife
- 2017–2018: Sport Recife (assistant)
- 2017: Sport Recife (interim)
- 2017: Sport Recife (interim)
- 2018: Boa Esporte
- 2019–2020: Confiança
- 2020: Sport Recife
- 2020–2021: Confiança
- 2021–2022: Guarani
- 2022: CRB
- 2023–2024: CRB
- 2025: Remo
- 2025: Sport Recife
- 2026: Goiás
- 2026: Ceará
- * Club domestic league appearances and goals

Daniel Pollo Baroni (born 5 May 1982), known as Daniel Paulista, is a Brazilian professional football coach and former player who played as a defensive midfielder.

== Playing career ==
Daniel Paulista was born in Ribeirão Preto, São Paulo, and started his career at hometown club Comercial. In 2003, he moved to Santos, being the immediate backup of Paulo Almeida as the club finished second in the league.

In 2004, Daniel Paulista was deemed surplus to requirements by new head coach Vanderlei Luxemburgo, and was released on 6 July of that year. He would play for Juventude, Sertãozinho and São Caetano in the following two years, only impressing with the latter.

In 2007 Daniel Paulista moved to Corinthians, but was loaned to Náutico in May of that year. On 2 January 2008, after his loan expired, he signed for Sport.

In September 2008, after winning the year's Copa do Brasil, Daniel Paulista moved abroad for the first time of his career, after agreeing to a four-year deal with Romanian Liga I club FC Rapid București for a € 800,000 fee. The following January, however, he left the club after appearing rarely, and subsequently returned to former club Sport.

Daniel Paulista left the Leão in January 2012, after struggling with several injuries. He subsequently represented Botafogo-SP, Comercial, Audax and ABC, retiring with the latter in 2014 at the age of 32.

== Coaching career ==
In July 2014 Daniel Paulista returned to Sport, as Eduardo Baptista's assistant. On 17 September of the following year, as Baptista left for Fluminense, he was named interim head coach until the arrival of Paulo Roberto Falcão.

On 13 October 2016, Daniel Paulista was appointed as first team coach until the end of the year, replacing Oswaldo de Oliveira. He returned to his previous role in the following year, but subsequently acted as interim on two more occasions.

On 7 May 2018, Daniel Paulista took over Boa Esporte, but left the club less than two months later. He was appointed in charge of Confiança the following 12 March, leading the club to their promotion to the Série B.

On 15 February 2020, Daniel Paulista returned to Sport, being named head coach in the place of sacked Guto Ferreira, but was himself sacked on 24 August. On 16 September, he returned to his former club Confiança.

On 10 May 2021, after being knocked out of the year's Campeonato Sergipano, Daniel Paulista left Confiança on a mutual agreement. Thirteen days later, he replaced Allan Aal at the helm of Guarani.

On 4 May 2022, Daniel Paulista left Bugre on a mutual agreement. Ten days later, he took over CRB also in the second tier. He was sacked from the latter on 3 November, but returned to the club on 29 May 2023.

Daniel Paulista was sacked from CRB on 4 September 2024, after nine winless matches. The following 13 March, he replaced Rodrigo Santana at the helm of Remo also in the second division.

On 6 June 2025, Daniel Paulista asked to leave Remo to return to Sport, after the club paid his release clause; his new club announced him as head coach the following day. He was sacked on 28 October, with the club seriously threatened with relegation.

On 9 December 2025, Daniel Paulista returned to the second division after taking over Goiás. He led the club to the 2026 Campeonato Goiano with an unbeaten status, but was sacked on 24 June, after a run of four winless matches. The following day, he was announced as head coach of fellow league team Ceará.

On 8 November 2026, with Ceará still under threat of relegation with one match before the end of the season, Daniel Paulista resigned in a press conference, with the club confirming his departure shortly after.

== Managerial statistics ==
As of 26 June 2026

Managerial record by team and tenure
Team	Nat	From	To	Record								Ref
Team	Nat	From	To	G	W	D	L	GF	GA	GD	Win %	Ref
Sport Recife (interim)	(Brazil)	20 September 2015	20 September 2015	1	0	0	1	1	2	−1	0.00	
Sport Recife	(Brazil)	13 October 2016	27 March 2017	18	12	2	4	33	13	+20	66.67	
Sport Recife (interim)	(Brazil)	27 October 2017	31 December 2017	10	3	2	5	10	17	−7	30.00	
Boa Esporte	(Brazil)	7 May 2018	24 June 2018	8	1	3	4	6	12	−6	12.50	
Confiança	(Brazil)	12 March 2019	15 February 2020	40	18	11	11	50	43	+7	45.00	
Sport Recife	(Brazil)	16 February 2020	24 August 2020	17	6	5	6	23	15	+8	35.29	
Confiança	(Brazil)	17 September 2020	10 May 2021	43	17	12	14	61	42	+19	39.53	
Guarani	(Brazil)	26 May 2021	4 May 2022	58	22	18	18	72	66	+6	37.93	
CRB	(Brazil)	16 May 2022	3 November 2022	30	12	10	8	29	28	+1	40.00	
CRB	(Brazil)	28 May 2023	5 September 2024	83	38	22	23	101	76	+25	45.78	
Remo	(Brazil)	21 March 2025	6 June 2025	14	7	5	2	19	12	+7	50.00	
Sport Recife	(Brazil)	7 June 2025	28 October 2025	19	2	9	8	17	28	−11	10.53	
Goiás	(Brazil)	9 December 2025	24 June 2026	33	15	11	7	45	32	+13	45.45	
Ceará	(Brazil)	25 June 2026	8 November 2026	22	7	5	10	23	29	−6	31.82	
Total				396	160	115	121	490	412	+78	40.40	—

== Honours ==
=== Player ===
Santos

- Copa Paulista: 2004
- Campeonato Brasileiro Série A: 2004

Sport

- Campeonato Pernambucano: 2008, 2009, 2010
- Copa do Brasil: 2008

=== Manager ===
CRB

- Campeonato Alagoano: 2024

Remo

- Campeonato Paraense: 2025

Goiás

- Campeonato Goiano: 2026
