= Lucas Rodrigues (footballer, born 2007) =

Brazilian footballer

Personal information
- Full name: Lucas Rodrigues Moreira Costa
- Date of birth: 29 October 2007 (age 19)
- Place of birth: Planaltina, Brazil
- Height: 1.80 m (5 ft 11 in)
- Position: Midfielder

Team information
- Current team: Goiás
- Number: 35

Youth career
- 2022–2025: Goiás

Senior career*
Years	Team	Apps	(Gls)
2025–	Goiás	33	(6)

International career
2026–	Brazil U20	5	(1)
- * Club domestic league appearances and goals as of 16 November 2026

Lucas Rodrigues Moreira Costa (born 29 October 2007), known as Lucas Rodrigues, is a Brazilian footballer who plays as a midfielder for Goiás.

== Club career ==
Born in Planaltina, Goiás, Lucas Rodrigues joined Goiás EC's youth sides in 2022, and signed his first professional contract in 2023. He made his senior debut on 12 February 2025, coming on as a late substitute for Aloísio in a 2–0 away win over União Rondonópolis, for the year's Copa Verde.

After three further Série B matches in the 2025 campaign, Lucas Rodrigues scored his first professional goal in the season opener on 11 January 2026, in a 4–0 Campeonato Goiano home routing of Goiatuba. He quickly became a regular starter for the Esmeraldino, and renewed his contract until 2029 on 6 February.

In June 2026, Lucas Rodrigues suffered a knee injury, being sidelined for nearly two months.

== International career ==
In May 2026, Lucas Rodrigues was called up to the Brazil national under-20 team.

== Career statistics ==
As of 7 October 2026

Club	Season	League			State League		Cup		Continental		Other		Total	
Club	Season	Division	Apps	Goals	Apps	Goals	Apps	Goals	Apps	Goals	Apps	Goals	Apps	Goals
Goiás	2025	Série B	3	0	0	0	0	0	—		1 (Note: Appearance(s) in Copa Verde)	0	4	0
Goiás	2026	Série B	16	2	10	4	3	0	—		—		29	6
Career total			19	2	10	4	3	0	0	0	1	0	33	6

== Honours ==
Goiás

- Campeonato Goiano: 2026
