= Lourenço (footballer) =

Brazilian footballer (born 1997)

Personal information
- Full name: João Paulo Ferreira Lourenço
- Date of birth: 7 September 1997 (age 29)
- Place of birth: Belo Horizonte, Brazil
- Height: 1.69 m (5 ft 7 in)
- Position: Winger

Team information
- Current team: Goiás
- Number: 97

Youth career
- Avaí

Senior career*
Years	Team	Apps	(Gls)
2017–2022	Avaí	151	(9)
2020–2021	→ Santa Cruz (loan)	17	(4)
2022	CSA	32	(2)
2023	Vila Nova	43	(4)
2024–2025	Ceará	79	(9)
2026–	Goiás	44	(2)
- * Club domestic league appearances and goals as of 17 November 2026

João Paulo Ferreira Lourenço (born 7 September 1997), simply known as Lourenço is a Brazilian footballer who plays for Goiás, as a winger.

== Club career ==
Born in Belo Horizonte, Lourenço graduated from the youth academy of Avaí. On 19 March 2017, he made his first team debut in a 4–1 defeat against Metropolitano. On 20 November, he scored his first professional goal for the club in a 2–1 league victory against Palmeiras.

On 17 March 2018, Lourenço scored the winning goal in a 1–0 victory against Fluminense in Copa do Brasil.

== Club statistics ==
As of 26 November 2019

Club	Season	League			State League		Cup		Continental		Other		Total	
Club	Season	Division	Apps	Goals	Apps	Goals	Apps	Goals	Apps	Goals	Apps	Goals	Apps	Goals
Avaí	2017	Série A	10	1	8	0	0	0	—		1 (Note: Appearance(s) in Primeira Liga)	0	19	1
Avaí	2018	Série B	5	0	12	0	2	1	—		—		19	1
Avaí	2019	Série A	24	0	12	0	3	0	—		—		39	0
Career total			39	1	32	0	5	1	0	0	1	0	77	2

== Honours ==
Avaí

- Campeonato Catarinense: 2019

Ceará

- Campeonato Cearense: 2024, 2025
