= Centro Oeste Futebol Clube =

Brazilian association football club based in Manaus, Amazonas, Brazil

Centro Oeste
- Full name: Centro Oeste Futebol Clube Sociedade Anônima do Futebol
- Nickname: Azulão
- Founded: 10 January 2009; 17 years ago
- Ground: Jaime Guerra
- Capacity: 4,000
- President: Dirceu Antônio de Oliveira Júnior
- Head coach: Márcio Goiano
- League: Campeonato Goiano
- 2025: Goiano Segunda Divisão, 2nd of 8 (promoted)
Home colors	Away colors	Third colors

Centro Oeste Futebol Clube Sociedade Anônima do Futebol, commonly referred to as Centro Oeste, is a Brazilian professional club based in Senador Canedo, Goiás. Founded on 10 January 2009, they play in the Campeonato Goiano, holding home matches at the Estádio Jaime Guerra in Nerópolis.

== History ==
Founded on 10 January 2009 in Senador Canedo, Centro Oeste only became a professional team in 2022, when they entered the year's Campeonato Goiano Third Division. They reached the finals of the competition, but lost the title to Santa Helena.

In the following two seasons, the club competed in the Campeonato Goiano Second Division, narrowly missing out promotion in both occasions.
