= Alessio Sundas =

Sports agent

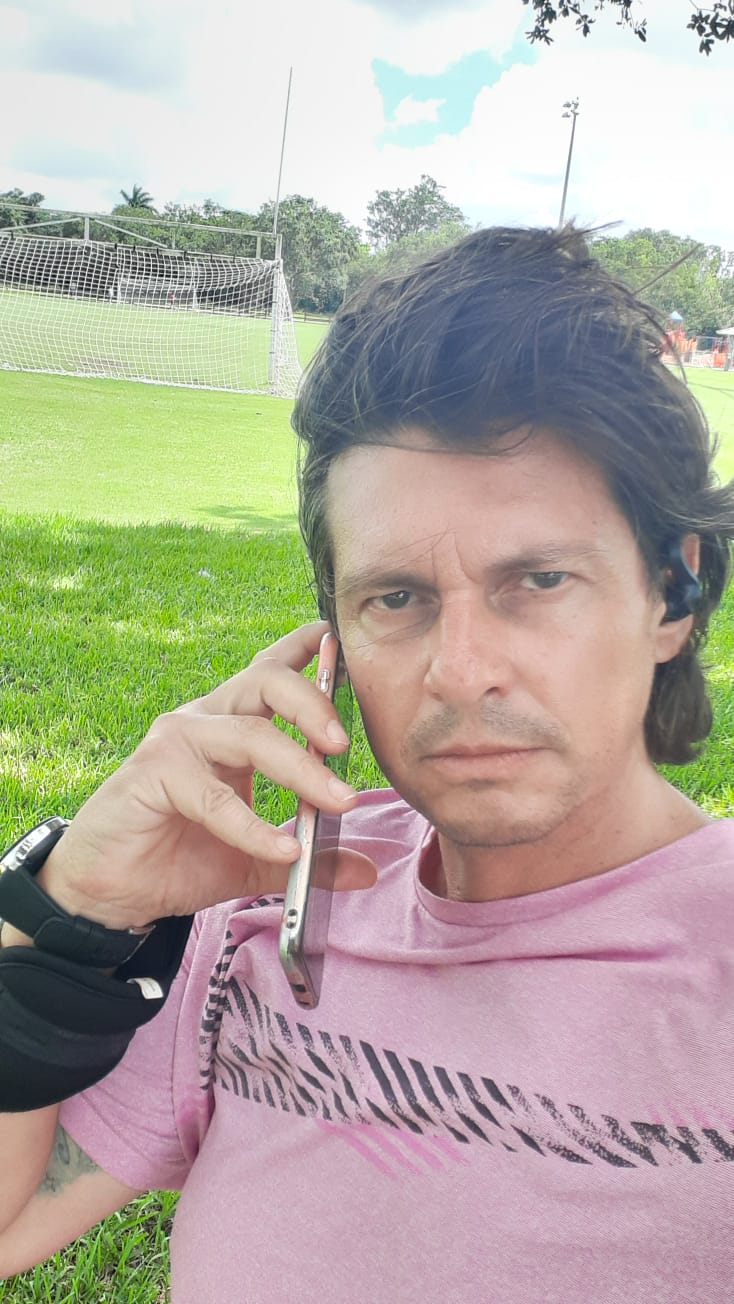
- Born: 2 December 1972 (age 53); Italy
- Education: B.Sc Physiotherapy, CEPLAT, B.Sc Marketing and Communication, Milan
- Occupation: Sports agent

Alessio Sundas (born 2 December 1971) is an Italian entertainer.

== Early life and education ==
Alessio Sundas was born in Italy. Sundas early education was at Linguistic High School after which he proceeded to CEPLAT where he earned a degree in Physiotherapy specializing in sports with a licence to operate ligaments. Sundas later obtained a degree in Marketing and Communication in Milan.

== Career ==
Sundas had a stint in television programs starting at the age of 19 when he first appeared in a program, Maurizio Costanzo Show. Later, Sundas appeared in Marta Flavi show on Canale 5 as a guest and Uomini e Donne TV show along with Maria De Filippi on same Canale 5.

== American Group Sports Management ==
Expanding his career to the United States in 2019, Sundas established American Group Sports Management one of the largest agencies in America that values Boca Raton players. The agency broker exchanges of players between European leagues and the Major League Soccer (MLS) and other lower leagues in the US. In January 2021, the company made its first major deal in the MLS with the transfer of Brazilian player Alenxdre Pato to Orlando City FC.

Sundas invented and recommended to FIFA, an AI tool called Lucy Project – a technology that monitors and improves tennis player's technique, movement and body posture. The Lucy project functions by placing a camera by tennis court, records the movement of the player, replays the movement and observes it by comparing it to the well-known movement of leading tennis players in courts to determine the mistakes in the movement. In 2016, Sundas complained to FIFA to increase the number of non-European players that can be registered by a European club from three to 50 per cent of its players or ban non-EU players from playing in the EU clubs to end football discriminatory practice in the EU. He wrote an open letter to FIFA asking it to introduce “Rule of 1” aimed at improving backward passes during football matches which is slow and boring.

== Agent career ==
In 2000, Sundas took a career in football and became Fifa agent and player manager. He later diversified to Formula 1, F2, F3 and F4 and NASCAR where he connects athletes with sponsors. In 2015, Sundas was registered as a member of Italian sports agent and managed Dei Giovani. Later he extended his managerial services to women's football managing the transfer of a Brazilian national player, Andressa Alves da Silva from FC Barcelona to AS Roma and Ferjani Sassi who played in the Russia 2018 FIFA World Cup for Tunisia national team.

After discussion with Real Madrid's Sports Director, Secura to bring Lionel Messi to Italy to play in serie A club, Napoli was unsuccessful, Sundas initiated discussions with foreign clubs for the transfer of goalkeeper Riccardo Piscitelli. In 2019, Sundas became the manager of the Italian-Tunisian goalkeeper, Aladin Ayoub who was playing in Serie B championship with Virtus Entella. In 2016, Sundas got Mattia Vaccaro registered with Napoli, where he received technical, tactical and athletic training until 2018/2019 season, when Sundas again moved Vaccaro to Ascoli for two years contract and was later proposed to CT Mancini. Sundas invented "Volarisation" (Enhancement) of players using technologies such VEO and GPS camera to record and analyze players' strength and weakness which are then used to correct and improve players' performance. In August 2021, he launched Alessio Sundas Method App which allows players to create personalized technical sheet compiled through the processing of three videos by Match Analysis and Analysis Data experts. ASM algorithm gives a value range from one to 1,000 on every player performance. The app is connected to technical and sports institutes for easy access to player's real performance data.

== Select transfer deals ==
Date	Player	Previous club	New club	Refs
2015	(Brazil) Maycon Vinícius Ferreira da Cruz	(Brazil) Atlético-MG	(Brazil) Atlético-PR	
2018	(Uruguay) Marcel Román	(Bolivia) Oriente Petrolero	(Bolivia) Real Santa Cruz	
2018	(Tunisia) Ferjani Sassi	(Tunisia) Espérance Sportive de Tunis	(Saudi Arabia) Al-Nassr	
2019	(Brazil) Andressa Alves da Silva	(Spain) FC Barcelona Femení	(Italy) A.S. Roma	
2019	(Dominican Republic) Geremy Lombardi	(Italy) Fiorenzuola	(Italy) Legnano	
2020	(Tunisia) Aladin Ayoub	(Italy) Entella	(Tunisia) ES Sahel	
2020	(France) Adil Rami	(Russia) PFC Sochi	(Portugal) Boavista F.C.	
2020	(Argentina) Guillermo Bufalo Szeszurak	Argentina national Team	Unknown.	
2021	(Brazil) Alexandre Pato	(Brazil) São Paulo	(United States) Orlando City	
