= Anselmo Ramon =

Brazilian footballer (born 1988)

- Anselmo Ramon in 2026

Personal information
- Full name: Anselmo Ramon Alves Herculano
- Date of birth: June 23, 1988 (age 38)
- Place of birth: Camaçari, Brazil
- Height: 1.82 m (6 ft 0 in)
- Position: Striker

Team information
- Current team: Goiás
- Number: 9

Youth career
- 2005–2007: Bahia
- 2007–2008: Cruzeiro

Senior career*
Years	Team	Apps	(Gls)
2008–2014	Cruzeiro	77	(23)
2008	→ Itaúna (loan)	2	(0)
2009	→ Cabofriense (loan)	11	(6)
2009	→ Kashiwa Reysol (loan)	5	(0)
2010	→ Rio Branco-SP (loan)	13	(5)
2010	→ Avaí (loan)	4	(0)
2010	→ CFR Cluj (loan)	2	(0)
2011	→ Oeste (loan)	17	(10)
2014	→ Hangzhou Greentown (loan)	28	(16)
2015–2017	Hangzhou Greentown	59	(25)
2018–2019	Guarani	13	(2)
2019	Vitória	32	(6)
2020–2021	Chapecoense	82	(21)
2022–2025	CRB	177	(64)
2025–	Goiás	74	(22)
- * Club domestic league appearances and goals as of 17 November 2026

Anselmo Ramon Alves Herculano (born 23 June 1988), known as Anselmo Ramon, is a Brazilian footballer who plays as a striker for Goiás.

== Club statistics ==
As of match played 23 November 2025

Appearances and goals by club, season and competition
Club	Season	League			State League		National Cup		Continental		Other		Total	
Club	Season	Division	Apps	Goals	Apps	Goals	Apps	Goals	Apps	Goals	Apps	Goals	Apps	Goals
Cabofriense	2009	Carioca	—		14	7	—		—		—		14	7
Kashiwa Reysol (loan)	2009	J1 League	5	0	—		0	0	—		—		5	0
Rio Branco (loan)	2010	Paulista	0	0	13	5	0	0	—		—		13	5
Avaí	2010	Série A	4	0	—		—		—		—		4	0
Cluj (loan)	2010–11	Liga I	2	0	—		1	0	—		—		3	0
Oeste (loan)	2011	Paulista	0	0	17	10	0	0	—		—		17	10
Cruzeiro	2011	Série A	25	10	—		—		—		—		25	10
Cruzeiro	2012	Série A	24	4	12	7	5	2	—		—		41	13
Cruzeiro	2013	Série A	8	1	8	1	1	0	—		—		17	2
Cruzeiro	Total		57	16	20	8	6	2	—		—		83	26
Hangzhou Greentown (loan)	2014	Chinese Super League	28	16	—		0	0	—		—		28	16
Hangzhou Greentown	2015	Chinese Super League	25	12	—		0	0	—		—		25	12
Hangzhou Greentown	2016	Chinese Super League	14	7	—		1	0	—		—		15	7
Hangzhou Greentown	2017	China League One	20	6	—		1	0	—		—		21	6
Hangzhou Greentown	Total		87	41	—		2	0	—		—		89	41
Guarani	2018	Série B	7	2	—		0	0	—		—		7	2
Guarani	2019	Série B	2	0	4	0	0	0	—		—		6	0
Guarani	Total		9	2	4	0	0	0	—		—		13	2
Vitória	2019	Série B	32	7	—		—		—		—		32	7
Chapecoense	2020	Série B	34	10	10	2	0	0	—		—		44	12
Chapecoense	2021	Série A	24	4	11	4	2	1	—		—		35	8
Chapecoense	Total		58	14	21	6	2	1	—		—		81	21
CRB	2022	Série B	32	9	9	4	1	0	—		7	2	49	15
CRB	2023	Série B	31	9	9	3	4	2	—		8	4	52	18
CRB	2024	Série B	36	10	7	7	3	1	—		12	5	58	23
CRB	2025	Série B	—		9	4	—		—		6	4	15	8
CRB	Total		99	28	34	18	8	3	—		33	15	174	64
Goiás	2025	Série B	35	10	—		—		—		0	0	35	10
Career totals			397	118	123	54	19	6	0	0	33	15	602	193

== Honours ==
Cruzeiro

- Campeonato Brasileiro Série A: 2013

Guarani

- Campeonato Paulista Série A2: 2018

Chapecoense

- Campeonato Catarinense: 2020
- Campeonato Brasileiro Série B: 2020

Goiás

- Campeonato Goiano: 2026
