= Esli García =

Venezuelan footballer

Personal information
- Full name: Esli Samuel García Cordero
- Date of birth: July 14, 2000 (age 26)
- Place of birth: Araure, Venezuela
- Height: 1.65 m (5 ft 5 in)
- Position: Forward

Team information
- Current team: Goiás
- Number: 15

Youth career
- Portuguesa

Senior career*
Years	Team	Apps	(Gls)
2017–2018	Portuguesa	39	(8)
2018–2023	Deportivo Táchira	99	(18)
2020	→ Santiago Wanderers (loan)	11	(0)
2022	→ Universidad Central (loan)	27	(5)
2024	Paysandu	31	(10)
2025–	Goiás	36	(3)
- * Club domestic league appearances and goals as of 17 November 2026

Esli Samuel García Cordero (born 14 July 2000) is a Venezuelan professional footballer who plays as a forward for Goiás.

== Club career ==
=== Deportivo Táchira ===
García joined Deportivo Táchira in 2018, where he played for four seasons. He won the Venezuelan first division twice.

=== Loans to Santiago Wanderers and Universidad Central de Venezuela ===
He was loaned to Chilean club Santiago Wanderers in 2020, where he made 11 appearances. Two years later he was loaned to Universidad Central de Venezuela, where he scored five goals in 27 games.

=== Paysandu ===
In 2024, he had his first experience of Brazilian football when he signed for Paysandu for the Série B season. He won the Copa Verde and the Campeonato Paraense, scoring in both finals.

== Career statistics ==
=== Club ===
As of match played 6 September 2024

Appearances and goals by club, season and competition
Club	Season	League			National cup		Continental		Other		Total	
Club	Season	Division	Apps	Goals	Apps	Goals	Apps	Goals	Apps	Goals	Apps	Goals
Portuguesa	2016	Venezuelan Primera División	—		2	0	—		—		2	0
Portuguesa	2017	Venezuelan Primera División	23	5	1	1	—		—		24	6
Portuguesa	2018	Venezuelan Primera División	16	3	—		—		—		16	3
Portuguesa	Total		39	8	3	1	—		—		42	9
Deportivo Táchira	2018	Venezuelan Primera División	18	3	1	0	—		—		19	3
Deportivo Táchira	2019	Venezuelan Primera División	36	9	—		—		—		36	9
Deportivo Táchira	2021	Venezuelan Primera División	14	1	—		1 (Note: Appearance(s) in Copa Sudamericana)	0	—		15	1
Deportivo Táchira	2023	Venezuelan Primera División	30	5	—		1	0	—		31	5
Deportivo Táchira	Total		98	18	1	0	2	0	—		101	18
Santiago Wanderers (loan)	2020	Chilean Primera División	11	0	—		—		—		11	0
Universidad Central (loan)	2022	Venezuelan Primera División	27	5	—		—		—		27	5
Paysandu	2024	Série B	23	6	1	0	—		6 (Note: Appearance(s) in Copa Verde)	1	30	7
Career Total			198	37	4	1	2	0	6	1	210	39

== Honours ==
Deportivo Táchira

- Venezuelan Primera División: 2021, 2023

Paysandu

- Copa Verde: 2024
- Campeonato Paraense: 2024
