= Estádio da Serrinha =

Multi-use stadium in Goiânia, Brazil

- Estádio da Serrinha
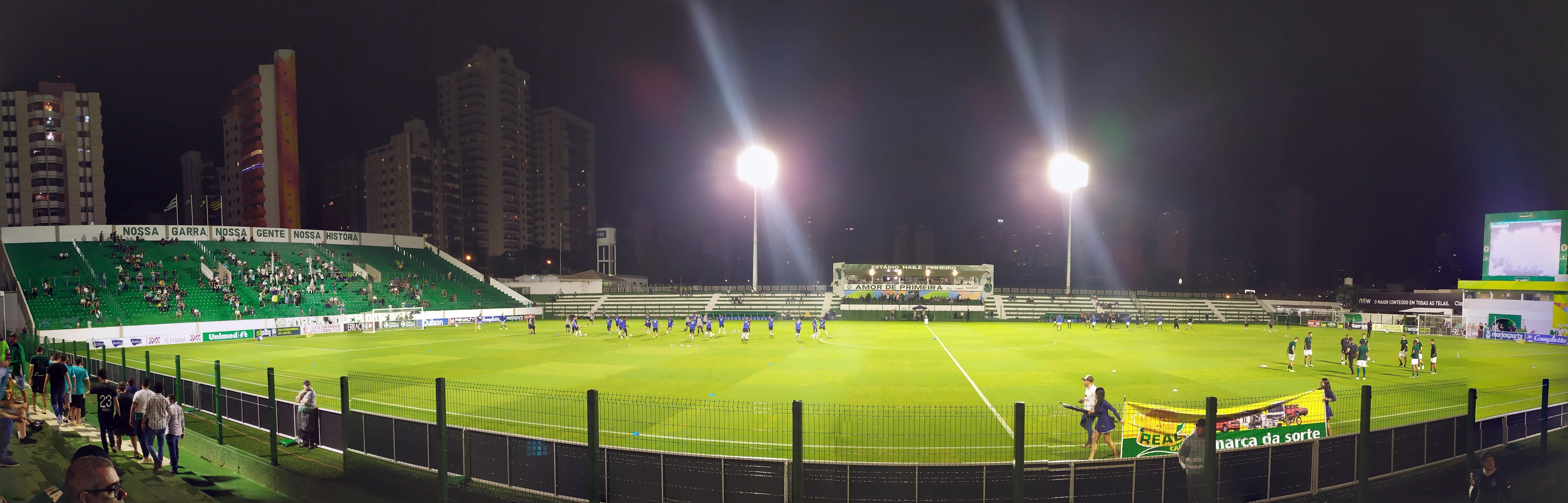
- Sisbrace
- Interactive map of Estádio da Serrinha
- Full name: Estádio Hailé Pinheiro
- Location: Goiânia, Goiás, Brasil
- Coordinates: 16°42′40″S 49°15′41″W
- Owner: Goiás
- Operator: Goiás
- Capacity: 14,450
- Surface: Emerald Grass
- Field size: 105 x 68 m

Construction
- Built: 1995
- Opened: 8 February 1995
- Renovated: 2003, 2013, 2018
- Expanded: 2019–2020
- Architect: Paulo Renato Alves

Tenant
- Goiás

Estádio Hailé Pinheiro, better known as Estádio da Serrinha, is a multi-use stadium located in Goiânia, Brazil. It is used mostly for football matches and hosts the home matches of Goiás Esporte Clube. The stadium has currently a maximum capacity of 14,450 people.

== History ==
The stadium had originally a capacity for 6,403 people.

Estádio da Serrinha was one of the venues of the 2019 FIFA U-17 World Cup.

=== Expansion ===
In February 2019 Goiás started expanding the stadium with the construction of a new terrace behind one of the goalposts, raising the capacity to 12,500 people. In February 2020 was started another phase of the expansion with the construction of a new sideline terrace scheduled to be finished in May 2020, with this expansion the capacity raised to 14,000 people, Goiás planned to start using the stadium for Campeonato Brasileiro Série A matches.
