= Gegê =

Brazilian footballer (born 1994)

Personal information
- Full name: Geirton Marques Aires
- Date of birth: 28 January 1994 (age 32)
- Place of birth: Mombaça, Brazil
- Height: 1.75 m (5 ft 9 in)
- Position: Attacking midfielder

Team information
- Current team: Goiás (on loan from CRB)
- Number: 28

Youth career
- Madureira
- 2009–2013: Botafogo

Senior career*
Years	Team	Apps	(Gls)
2013–2018	Botafogo	71	(5)
2017–2018	→ ABC (loan)	43	(10)
2018	Adana Demirspor	13	(1)
2019	Avaí	18	(2)
2020	Brasil de Pelotas	21	(2)
2021	Santo André	11	(2)
2021	Londrina	18	(1)
2022	Ferroviária	11	(1)
2022	Londrina	30	(1)
2023	Vitória	36	(2)
2024–	CRB	78	(15)
2026–	→ Goiás (loan)	31	(3)
- * Club domestic league appearances and goals as of 17 November 2026

Geirton Marques Aires (born 28 January 1994), commonly known as Gegê, is a Brazilian professional footballer who plays as an attacking midfielder for Goiás, on loan from CRB.

== Career statistics ==
As of match played 13 March 2025

Appearances and goals by club, season and competition
Club	Season	League			State league		National cup		Continental		Other		Total	
Club	Season	Division	Apps	Goals	Apps	Goals	Apps	Goals	Apps	Goals	Apps	Goals	Apps	Goals
Botafogo	2013	Série A	10	2	1 (Note: Appearance(s) in Campeonato Carioca)	0	3	0	—		—		14	2
Botafogo	2014	Série A	9	0	12	0	0	0	0	0	—		21	0
Botafogo	2015	Série B	4	0	14	1	2	1	—		—		20	2
Botafogo	2016	Série A	4	0	17	2	1	0	—		—		22	2
Botafogo	2017	Série A	0	0	0	0	0	0	0	0	—		0	0
Botafogo	Total		27	2	44	3	6	1	0	0	0	0	77	6
ABC (loan)	2017	Série B	28	2	15 (Note: Appearance(s) in Campeonato Potiguar)	8	4	0	—		4 (Note: Appearance(s) in Copa do Nordeste)	0	51	10
Adana Demirspor	2017-18	TFF 1. Lig	13	1	—		0	0	—		—		13	1
Avaí	2019	Série A	11	1	7 (Note: Appearance(s) in Campeonato Catarinense)	1	1	0	—		—		19	2
Brasil de Pelotas	2020	Série B	14	0	4 (Note: Appearance(s) in Campeonato Gaúcho)	2	3	0	—		—		21	2
Santo André	2021	Série D	0	0	11 (Note: Appearance(s) in Campeonato Paulista)	2	—		—		—		11	2
Londrina	2021	Série B	18	1	0	0	—		—		—		18	1
Ferroviária	2022	Série D	0	0	11	1	1	0	—		—		12	1
Londrina	2022	Série B	30	1	0	0	0	0	—		—		30	1
Vitória	2023	Série B	28	2	8 (Note: Appearance(s) in Campeonato Baiano)	0	1	0	—		6	0	43	2
CRB	2024	Série B	33	6	7 (Note: Appearance(s) in Campeonato Alagoano)	1	6	2	—		12	1	58	10
CRB	2025	Série B	7	1	9	4	1	0	—		5	1	22	6
CRB	Total		40	7	16	5	7	2	—		17	2	80	16
Career total			209	17	116	22	23	3	0	0	27	2	375	44

== Honours ==
Botafogo

- Campeonato Carioca: 2013
- Taça Guanabara: 2015
- Campeonato Brasileiro Série B: 2015

ABC

- Copa RN: 2017
- Campeonato Potiguar: 2017

Avaí

- Campeonato Catarinense: 2019
