= Nicolas Vichiatto =

Brazilian footballer

Nicolas
Personal information
- Full name: Nicolas Vicchiato da Silva
- Date of birth: 24 February 1997 (age 29)
- Place of birth: Arapongas, Brazil
- Height: 1.75 m (5 ft 9 in)
- Position: Left back

Team information
- Current team: Goiás
- Number: 6

Youth career
- 2012–2016: Atlético Paranaense

Senior career*
Years	Team	Apps	(Gls)
2016–2022	Athletico Paranaense	65	(1)
2018	→ Ponte Preta (loan)	7	(0)
2019–2021	→ Atlético Goianiense (loan)	83	(3)
2022	→ Grêmio (loan)	35	(2)
2023–2025	América Mineiro	42	(2)
2025	→ Ceará (loan)	17	(0)
2026–	Goiás	42	(2)
- * Club domestic league appearances and goals as of 17 November 2026

Nicolas Vichiatto da Silva (born 24 February 1997), simply known as Nicolas, is a Brazilian professional footballer who plays as a left back for Goiás.

== Club career ==
Born in Arapongas, Paraná, Nicolas Vicchiato joined Atlético Paranaense's youth setup in 2012, aged 13. He was definitely promoted to the first team in May 2016, after impressing with the under-20 squad.

Nicolas Vicchiato made his Série A debut on 22 June 2016, starting in a 0–0 away draw against Chapecoense; the game was only finished a day later due to the fog on the stadium.

In July 2018 Nicolas Vicchiato joined Ponte Preta on loan until the end of December.

In February 2019 Nicolas Vicchiato joined Atlético Goianiense on a year-long loan.

== Career statistics ==
As of match played 17 May 2025

Appearances and goals by club, season and competition
Club	Season	League			State League		Copa do Brasil		Continental		Other		Total	
Club	Season	Division	Apps	Goals	Apps	Goals	Apps	Goals	Apps	Goals	Apps	Goals	Apps	Goals
Athletico Paranaense	2016	Série A	15	0	0	0	1	0	—		—		16	0
Athletico Paranaense	2017	Série A	6	0	9 (Note: Appearance(s) in Campeonato Paranaense)	0	3	0	0	0	—		18	0
Athletico Paranaense	2018	Série A	1	0	6	1	0	0	0	0	—		7	1
Athletico Paranaense	2019	Série A	0	0	6	0	0	0	0	0	—		6	0
Athletico Paranaense	2020	Série A	0	0	0	0	0	0	0	0	—		0	0
Athletico Paranaense	2021	Série A	15	0	7	0	5	0	7 (Note: Appearance(s) in Copa Sudamericana)	0	—		34	0
Athletico Paranaense	2022	Série A	0	0	0	0	0	0	0	0	—		0	0
Athletico Paranaense	Total		37	0	28	1	9	0	7	0	—		81	1
Ponte Preta (loan)	2018	Série B	7	0	0	0	0	0	—		—		7	0
Atlético Goianiense (loan)	2019	Série B	35	2	8 (Note: Appearance(s) in Campeonato Goiano)	1	1	0	—		—		44	3
Atlético Goianiense (loan)	2020	Série A	30	0	10	0	7	1	—		1 (Note: Appearance(s) in Copa Verde)	0	48	1
Atlético Goianiense (loan)	Total		65	2	18	1	8	1	—		1	0	92	4
Grêmio (loan)	2022	Série B	26	0	9 (Note: Appearance(s) in Campeonato Gaúcho)	2	1	0	—		0	0	36	2
América Mineiro	2023	Série A	11	1	11 (Note: Appearance(s) in Campeonato Mineiro)	0	4	0	6	0	—		32	1
América Mineiro	2024	Série B	16	1	4	0	0	0	—		—		20	1
América Mineiro	2025	Série B	0	0	0	0	0	0	—		—		0	0
América Mineiro	Total		27	2	15	0	4	0	6	0	—		52	2
Ceará (loan)	2025	Série A	3	0	4 (Note: Appearance(s) in Campeonato Cearense)	0	0	0	—		4 (Note: Appearance(s) in Copa do Nordeste)	0	11	0
Career total			165	4	74	4	22	1	13	0	5	0	279	9

== Honours ==
Atlético Goianiense

- Campeonato Goiano: 2020

Grêmio

- Campeonato Gaúcho: 2022
- Recopa Gaúcha: 2022
