= Associação Esportiva Jataiense =

Jataiense
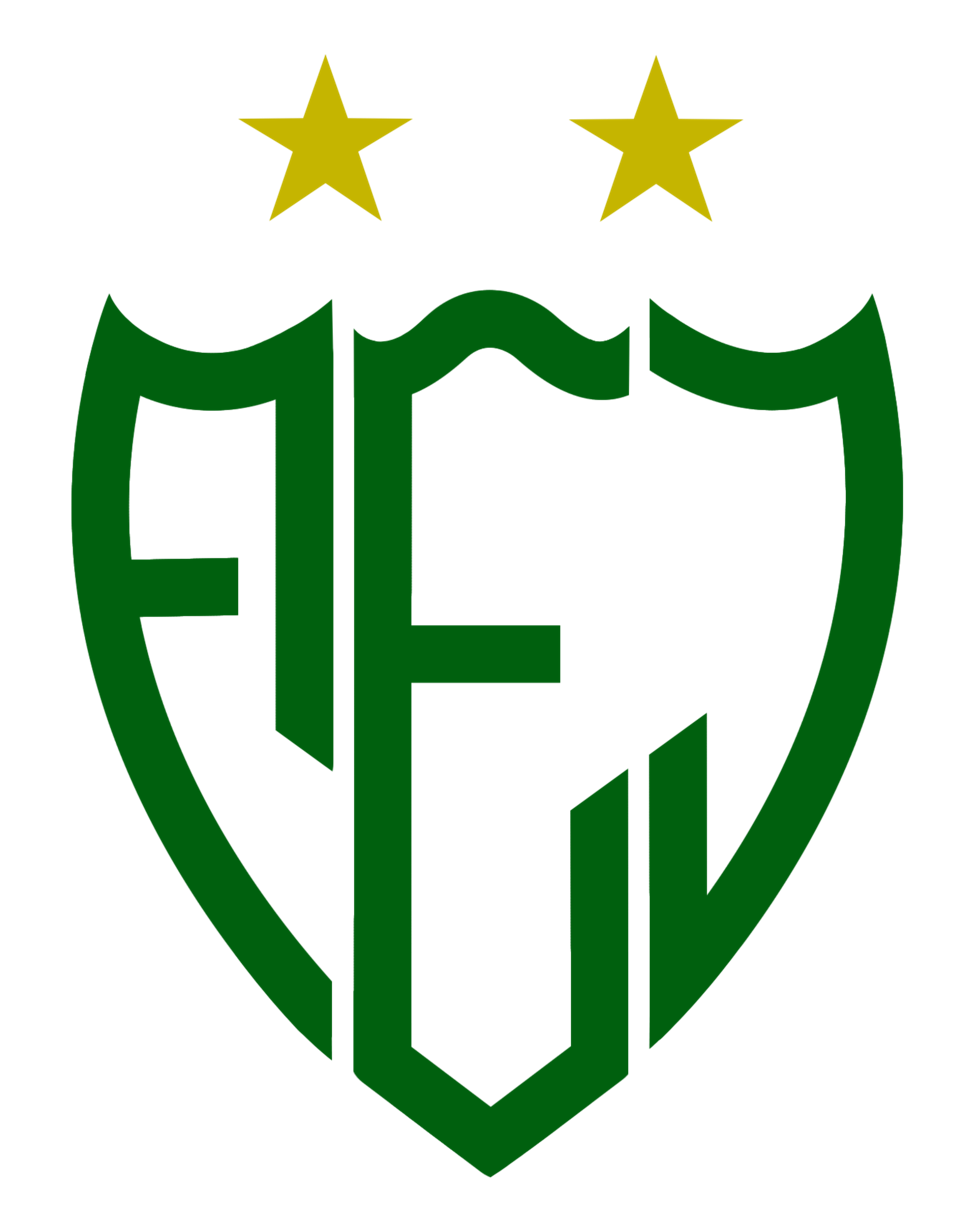
- Full name: Associação Esportiva Jataiense
- Nickname: Raposa do Sudoeste (Fox of the Southwest)
- Founded: January 11, 1952
- Ground: Arapucão, Jataí, Goiás state, Brazil
- Capacity: 18.000
- President: Humberto Macchione
- Head Coach: Gian Rodrigues
- League: Campeonato Goiano - First Division
- 2025: 8º
Home colours	Away colours	colours

Associação Esportiva Jataiense is a Brazilian football club based in the city of Jataí, in the state of Goiás. Founded on January 11, 1952, it is one of the most traditional clubs in the state. Its colors are green and white, and the club is known as the "Raposa do Sudoeste" ("Fox of the Southwest"), a reference to its mascot, the fox. The team competes in tournaments organized by the Goiás State Football Federation and plays its home matches at Estádio Municipal Jerônimo Ferreira Fraga, also known as Arapucão.

== History ==
Foundation and Amateur Era (1952–1982)

The club was founded on January 11, 1952, in the projection room of the former Cine Avenida by a group of local football enthusiasts. The main founder was Jerônimo Ferreira Fraga, who became the club's first president. With the support of the community, Fraga raised funds to build the city's first stadium and chose the fox as the club's official mascot.

Throughout the 1950s, 1960s, and 1970s, Jataiense stood out in the amateur football scene, participating in local tournaments, friendlies, and regional competitions. One of the notable figures during this period was Maguito Vilela, who played for the club in his youth. He earned the nickname "Maguito" due to his tall and slender stature. In 1976, he became president of the club and later had a prominent political career, serving as a state deputy, governor of Goiás, senator, mayor of Aparecida de Goiânia, and was elected mayor of Goiânia in 2020. However, he died from COVID-19 complications before taking office. He also served as vice president of the Brazilian Football Confederation (CBF) and maintained strong ties to Jataiense throughout his life.

Professional Era (1983–1989)

Jataiense turned professional in 1983, debuting in the Campeonato Goiano Second Division. The team finished in 5th place and, under that season's regulations, was promoted to the First Division. In 1984, the club was relegated after finishing last, returned in 1987, and was again relegated in 1988. In 1989, Jataiense finished as runners-up in the Second Division, securing promotion once more.

1990s and Inactivity

Throughout the 1990s, Jataiense maintained a regular presence in the Campeonato Goiano First Division. In 1999, the club was relegated after finishing 9th in a season that saw six teams demoted. Following the relegation, the club entered a period of inactivity with the state football federation.

Return and State-Level Success (2002–2006)

Jataiense returned to competition in 2002 and won the Intermediate Division, securing promotion back to the First Division. In 2004, the club had its most successful campaign in the Campeonato Goiano, reaching the final quadrangular stage with players such as Sérgio Müller and Borges. In the last round, the team drew 0–0 with Vila Nova at Estádio Serra Dourada. The spot in the final was decided on penalties, with Vila Nova winning 3–0. The match was marked by controversy after a legitimate Jataiense goal was disallowed, as the ball had crossed the line before being cleared.

That same year, Jataiense debuted in the Campeonato Brasileiro Série C, being eliminated in the first stage. The club returned to the competition in 2006 and reached the second phase.

Restructuring and Comeback (2016–2020)

In 2016, the club underwent administrative restructuring with the establishment of a Deliberative Council, chaired by Leandro Pedrosa de Assis. In 2017, Jataiense was reinstated by the Goiás Football Federation and competed in the Third Division of the state championship. In 2020, the club won the Second Division title, securing promotion to the First Division for the 2021 season.

2020s: Stability and Reconstruction

In 2022, Jataiense was relegated again but achieved immediate promotion in 2023. In 2024, the club finished 9th in the Campeonato Goiano, remaining in the top division.

2025 Season

In 2025, with a newly appointed board and a squad assembled on short notice, Jataiense exceeded expectations by reaching the quarterfinals of the Campeonato Goiano. The team was eliminated by Vila Nova with a 1–0 aggregate score. Vila Nova went on to win the title, ending a 19-year state championship drought.

== Achievements ==
- Campeonato Goiano Second Division:
  - Winners (2): 2002, 2020
  - Runners-up: 1989, 2023

== Stadium ==
Jataiense plays its home matches at the Estádio Municipal Jerônimo Ferreira Fraga, commonly known as Arapucão, located in Jataí, Goiás. The stadium is municipally owned and has a maximum capacity of 18,000 spectators. It is named after Jerônimo Ferreira Fraga, the founder and first president of the club. Arapucão is one of the main sports venues in the southwestern region of Goiás and regularly hosts matches of the state championship as well as other regional events.
