= Djalma Silva =

Brazilian footballer

Personal information
- Full name: Djalma Antônio da Silva Filho
- Date of birth: 19 September 1994 (age 32)
- Place of birth: Recife, Brazil
- Height: 1.80 m (5 ft 11 in)
- Position: Left-back

Team information
- Current team: Goiás
- Number: 54

Youth career
- 2010–2012: Atlético Pernambucano

Senior career*
| Years | Team | Apps | (Gls) |
| 2012–2019 | Atlético Pernambucano | 44 | (5) |
| 2013 | → Vera Cruz (loan) | 0 | (0) |
| 2015 | → Olinda (loan) | 0 | (0) |
| 2016 | → Afogados (loan) | 0 | (0) |
| 2017 | → Nacional de Patos (loan) | 9 | (5) |
| 2017 | → Decisão (loan) | 4 | (2) |
| 2018 | → Treze (loan) | 13 | (2) |
| 2019 | → URT (loan) | 11 | (0) |
| 2019 | → Treze (loan) | 17 | (1) |
| 2019–2020 | Confiança | 48 | (0) |
| 2021 | Operário Ferroviáro | 50 | (4) |
| 2021–2022 | Bahia | 19 | (0) |
| 2022–2024 | AEL Limassol | 68 | (5) |
| 2024–2025 | Göztepe | 23 | (1) |
| 2026– | Goiás | 32 | (3) |
- * Club domestic league appearances and goals as of 17 November 2026

Djalma Antônio da Silva Filho (born 19 September 1994) is a Brazilian professional footballer who plays as a left-back for Goiás.

== Club career ==
A youth product of Atlético Pernambucano, Djalma Silva spent almost a decade contracted to them while he was loaned out to various Brazilian clubs. He's had loans with Vera Cruz, Olinda, Afogados, Nacional de Patos, Decisão, Treze, and URT.

On 16 November 2019, Djalma Silva signed with Confiança in the Campeonato Brasileiro Série B. On 9 February 2021, he signed with Operário Ferroviáro. On 21 December 2021, he transferred to Bahia until the end of 2022. On 29 July 2022, he transferred to the Cypriot First Division club AEL Limassol. On 14 July 2023, he extended his agreement with AEL for another season. On 1 June 2024, he transferred to the Turkish club Göztepe on a 1+1 year contract.
