= Jean Carlos (footballer, born 2005) =

Brazilian footballer (born 2005)

Personal information
- Full name: Jean Carlos Alves Ferreira
- Date of birth: 8 May 2005 (age 21)
- Place of birth: São Félix do Araguaia, Brazil
- Height: 1.75 m (5 ft 9 in)
- Position: Attacking midfielder

Team information
- Current team: Goiás
- Number: 21

Youth career
- 2020–: Atlético Goianiense

Senior career*
Years	Team	Apps	(Gls)
2024	Atlético Goianiense	4	(0)
2025–	Goiás	55	(7)
- * Club domestic league appearances and goals as of 17 November 2026

Jean Carlos Alves Ferreira (born 8 May 2005), known as Jean Carlos, is a Brazilian professional footballer who plays mainly as an attacking midfielder for Goiás.

== Career ==
Born in São Félix do Araguaia, Mato Grosso, Jean Carlos moved to Atlético Goianiense's youth sides in 2020. He made his first team – and Série A – debut on 29 September, coming on as a late substitute for Rhaldney and providing the assist to Janderson's winner in a 1–0 home win over Fluminense.

== Career statistics ==
As of 23 October 2024

Club	Season	League			State League		Cup		Continental		Other		Total	
Club	Season	Division	Apps	Goals	Apps	Goals	Apps	Goals	Apps	Goals	Apps	Goals	Apps	Goals
Atlético Goianiense	2024	Série A	3	0	—		—		—		—		3	0
Career total			3	0	0	0	0	0	0	0	0	0	3	0
