= Goiás Esporte Clube =

Brazilian association football club based in Goiânia, Goiás, Brazil

Goiás
- Full name: Goiás Esporte Clube
- Nicknames: Verdão (Big Green); Esmeraldino (Emerald Green)
- Founded: 6 April 1943; 83 years ago
- Stadium: Estádio da Serrinha
- Capacity: 14,450
- President: Paulo Rogerio Pinheiro
- Head coach: Mozart
- League: Campeonato Brasileiro Série B Campeonato Goiano
- 2025 2025: Série B, 6th of 20; Goiano, 4th of 12
- Website: www.goiasec.com.br
Home colors	Away colors	Third colors

Goiás Esporte Clube is a Brazilian football club based in Goiânia, Goiás. It competes in the Campeonato Goiano, the Goiás highest level state league, and in the Campeonato Brasileiro Série B, the second tier of Brazilian league system. The club plays its home matches at Estádio da Serrinha for 14,450 spectators, and occasionally at Estádio Serra Dourada for 42,049 spectators.

Goiás is one of the biggest clubs in Brazil's Central-West region. The club holds the record of 29 titles in the state league, and has won Copa Centro-Oeste three times and Copa Verde once. At the national level, the club won the Campeonato Brasileiro Série B in 1999 and 2012, and has made most appearances in the Campeonato Brasileiro Série A (43) than any other club from the Central-West region. Internationally, Goiás finished as runners-up in the 2010 Copa Sudamericana, and participated in the Copa Libertadores twice.

Its main rivals are Vila Nova, Atlético Goianiense and Goiânia.

== History ==
On 6 April 1943, in a meeting among friends at Lino Barsi's home, Goiás Esporte Clube was founded. In 1973, the team was promoted to the first division of Campeonato Brasileiro. In 1998, the team joined the Clube dos 13 (Clube dos 13 is an organization composed by the greatest teams of Brazil). They won the Série B in 1999 and 2012.

== Stadium ==
Goiás' stadium is Serrinha, with a maximum capacity of 14,450 people. However, the club plays several matches at Estádio Serra Dourada, built in 1975, with a maximum capacity of 50,049 people.

== Support ==
=== Fanbase size ===
In its first year of existence, it was said that Goiás had only 33 fans.

It is currently the football club with the largest number of fans in Goiás, the North and Midwest regions of Brazil, according to a survey conducted by the Gallup Institute, Placar, Serpes, and Pluri Consultoria.

Esmeraldino of Central Brazil was found to have the 16th largest number of fans in Brazil, with 1.6 million fans.

=== Ultras ===
==== Força Jovem Goiás (FJG) ====
Founded on 23 May 1997, from the extinction of the Green Hell, with the goal of creating an association of fans that really enjoyed Goiás. Jovem Goiás fans managed to win the support and respect among the emerald, which now has approximately 12,000 fans.

==== Headquarters Serrinha ====
Administrative Headquarters

- Serrinha Stadium (Stadium Haile Pinheiro): capacity: 9.900 spectators.
- Gymnasium covered with capacity for 3,000 people.
- Complete structure of concentration for the athletes.
- 2 grasslands training for students of the Little School Sports Initiation.
- A 25m swimming pool and indoor semi-Olympic heated for Sports Initiation.
- Parking for 300 vehicles.
- 2 sand courts for volleyball and lighted futvôlei.
- Runs to 1-kilometer jogging.
- Area available for conduct of parties.

==== Edmo Pinheiro Sports and Recreation Centre ====
Park Anhanguera

- 4 grasslands officers.
- Changing rooms with custom closets (with photo of each player), air conditioning, showers, hot tubs, and special chairs.
- Technical Committee room with computers, TV and DVD and meeting table, and an exclusive locker room with shower and toilet.
- Medical Department
- Gym
- Recreation area with kiosk and barbecue.
- 3 football fields.
- Natural lake.

The mini-forest with native trees.

- Amusement Playground.

==== Coimbra Bueno Center ====
Aparecida de Goiânia

- Training Center.
- Assistance to needy children in the south, and Goiânia.
- Jogging track.
- 200 grasslands.

== Honours ==
=== Official tournaments ===
National
Competitions	Titles	Seasons
Campeonato Brasileiro Série B	2	1999, 2012
Regional
Competitions	Titles	Seasons
Copa Verde	1	2023
Copa Centro-Oeste	3	2000, 2001, 2002
State
Competitions	Titles	Seasons
Campeonato Goiano	29	1966, 1971, 1972, 1975, 1976, 1981, 1983, 1986, 1987, 1989, 1990, 1991, 1994, 1996, 1997, 1998, 1999, 2000, 2002, 2003, 2006, 2009, 2012, 2013, 2015, 2016, 2017, 2018, 2026
Copa Leonino Caiado	5	1972, 1973, 1974, 1975-I, 1977

- record

=== Others tournaments ===
==== State ====
- Torneio Início do Campeonato Goiano (9): 1948, 1951, 1955, 1956, 1958, 1960, 1968, 1971, 1974

=== Runners-up ===
- Copa Sudamericana (1): 2010
- Copa do Brasil (1): 1990
- Campeonato Brasileiro Série B (2): 1994, 2021
- Copa Verde (1): 2025
- Campeonato Goiano (24): 1945, 1951, 1953, 1956, 1960, 1964, 1973, 1974, 1977, 1978, 1980, 1982, 1988, 1992, 1993, 2001, 2005, 2007, 2008, 2011, 2014, 2019, 2022, 2023
- Copa Goiás (2): 1968, 1998

=== Women's Football ===
- Campeonato Goiano de Futebol Feminino (1): 2019

== Statistics ==
=== Campeonato Brasileiro Série A record ===
Year	Position	Year	Position	Year	Position	Year	Position	Year	Position	Year	Position
1971	-	1981	24th	1991	15th	2001	10th	2011	-	2021	-
1972	-	1982	33rd	1992	17th	2002	12th	2012	-	2022	13th
1973	13th	1983	7th	1993	26th	2003	9th	2013	6th	2023	18th
1974	21st	1984	14th	1994	-	2004	6th	2014	12th	2024	-
1975	17th	1985	35th	1995	8th	2005	3rd	2015	19th		
1976	30th	1986	23rd	1996	4th	2006	8th	2016	-		
1977	35th	1987	13th	1997	19th	2007	16th	2017	-		
1978	14th	1988	13th	1998	22nd	2008	8th	2018	-		
1979	7th	1989	10th	1999	-	2009	9th	2019	10th		
1980	-	1990	10th	2000	10th	2010	19th	2020	18th		

=== Copa Libertadores record ===
Year	Position
2006	20th

=== Copa Sudamericana record ===
Year	Position
2004	14th
2005	33rd
2007	13th
2009	12th
2010	2nd
2014	12th
2015	27th

== Players ==
=== First team squad ===
As of 6 September 2026.

Note: Flags indicate national team as defined under FIFA eligibility rules; some limited exceptions apply. Players may hold more than one non-FIFA nationality.

No.	Pos.	Nation	Player
1	GK	BRA	Thiago Rodrigues
2	DF	BRA	Rodrigo Soares
3	DF	BRA	Luiz Felipe
4	DF	BRA	Ramon Menezes (on loan from Sport Recife)
5	MF	BRA	Filipe Machado
6	DF	BRA	Nicolas Vichiatto
8	MF	BRA	Juninho
9	FW	BRA	Anselmo Ramon
10	MF	BRA	Lucas Lima
11	FW	BRA	Felipe Clemente (on loan from Gama)
14	DF	BRA	Lucas Ribeiro
15	FW	VEN	Esli García
17	FW	BRA	Pedrinho
18	FW	BRA	Cadu (on loan from Atlético Mineiro)
21	FW	BRA	Jean Carlos

No.	Pos.	Nation	Player
23	GK	BRA	Tadeu (captain)
25	DF	BRA	Luisão (on loan from Santos)
27	FW	BRA	Wellington Rato (on loan from Vitória)
28	MF	BRA	Gegê
29	DF	BRA	Murilo Câmara
35	MF	BRA	Lucas Rodrigues
40	FW	BRA	Kadu Sousa
41	GK	BRA	Ezequiel Ribeiro
54	DF	BRA	Djalma Silva
55	MF	BRA	Baldória
63	DF	BRA	Marcos Vinícius
66	DF	BRA	Danilo Cunha
77	FW	BRA	Halerrandrio
88	MF	BRA	Brayann
97	MF	BRA	Lourenço

=== Youth team ===
Note: Flags indicate national team as defined under FIFA eligibility rules; some limited exceptions apply. Players may hold more than one non-FIFA nationality.

No.	Pos.	Nation	Player
19	FW	BRA	Willie
32	GK	BRA	Murillo Victorio

=== Out on loan ===
Note: Flags indicate national team as defined under FIFA eligibility rules; some limited exceptions apply. Players may hold more than one non-FIFA nationality.

No.	Pos.	Nation	Player
—	DF	BRA	Diego Caito (to Grêmio until 31 December 2026)
—	DF	BRA	Moraes (to Operário Ferroviário until 30 November 2026)

No.	Pos.	Nation	Player
—	MF	BRA	Vitor Fonseca (to Anápolis until 30 November 2026)

=== Technical staff ===
- Head coach: Vagner Mancini
- Assistant manager: Réver, Cláudio Andrade
- Fitness coach: Lucas Itaberaba, Ednilson Sena, Leandro Campos, Álvaro Henrique
- Goalkeeping coaches: Edimar Torquato, Flávio Mendes

== Managers ==
- (Brazil) Zé Mário (1987–88)
- (Brazil) Luiz Felipe Scolari (1988)
- (Brazil) Roberto Oliveira (1990)
- (Brazil) Zé Mário (1991–92)
- (Brazil) Arthur Bernardes (1992)
- (Brazil) Roberval Davino (1993)
- (Brazil) Mauro Fernandes (1993–95)
- (Brazil) Hélio dos Anjos (1995)
- (Brazil) Carlos Alberto Silva (1997–98)
- (Brazil) Gílson Nunes (1998)
- (Brazil) Hélio dos Anjos (1999–01)
- (Brazil) Lori Sandri (2001)
- (Brazil) Hélio dos Anjos (2001–02)
- (Brazil) Vica (2002)
- (Brazil) Nelsinho Baptista (Aug 27, 2002 – June 18, 2003)
- (Brazil) Edinho (Aug 27, 2002 – June 15, 2003)
- (Brazil) Cuca (May 26, 2003 – Dec 13, 2003)
- (Brazil) Ivo Wortmann (Dec 16, 2003 – Feb 27, 2004)
- (Brazil) Celso Roth (March 30, 2004 – Dec 19, 2004)
- (Brazil) Péricles Chamusca (Jan 1, 2005 – April 24, 2005)
- (Brazil) Edson Gaúcho (April 24, 2005 – July 17, 2005)
- (Brazil) Geninho (July 18, 2005 – May 10, 2006)
- (Brazil) Antônio Lopes (May 12, 2006 – Aug 14, 2006)
- (Brazil) Geninho (Aug 14, 2006 – May 6, 2007)
- (Brazil) Wanderley Filho (int.) (May 1, 2007 – May 12, 2007)
- (Brazil) Paulo Bonamigo (May 11, 2007 – Sept 15, 2007)
- (Brazil) Márcio Araújo (Sept 20, 2007 – Nov 29, 2007)
- (Brazil) Cassius Hartmann (int.) (Dec 1, 2007 – Dec 31, 2007)
- (Brazil) Caio Júnior (Jan 6, 2008 – May 5, 2008)
- (Brazil) Vadão (May 7, 2008 – June 15, 2008)
- (Brazil) Hélio dos Anjos (June 15, 2008 – Jan 25, 2010)
- (Brazil) Jorginho Cantinflas (Jan 25, 2010 – April 20, 2010)
- (Brazil) Émerson Leão (April 26, 2010 – Aug 27, 2010)
- (Brazil) Jorginho (Aug 29, 2010 – Nov 9, 2010)
- (Brazil) Arthur Neto (Nov 9, 2010 – June 28, 2011)
- (Brazil) Márcio Goiano (2011)
- (Brazil) Ademir Fonseca (2011)
- (Brazil) Enderson Moreira (2011–13)
- (Brazil) Claudinei Oliveira (2014)
- (Brazil) Ricardo Drubscky (2014)
- (Japan) Wagner Lopes (2015)
- (Brazil) Hélio dos Anjos (2015)
- (Brazil) Julinho Camargo (2015)
- (Brazil) Arthur Neto (2015)
- (Brazil) Danny Sérgio (2015)
- (Brazil) Enderson Moreira (2016)
- (Brazil) Léo Condé (2016)
- (Brazil) Gilson Kleina (2016–17)
- (Brazil) Sérgio Soares (2017)
- (Brazil) Sílvio Criciúma (2017)
- (Brazil) Argel Fucks (2017)
- (Brazil) Sílvio Criciúma (2017)
- (Brazil) Hélio dos Anjos (2017–18)
- (Brazil) Ney Franco (2018)
- (Brazil) Mauricio Barbieri (2019)
- (Brazil) Claudinei Oliveira (2019)
- (Brazil) Ney Franco (2019–20)
- (Brazil) Thiago Larghi (2020)
- (Brazil) Enderson Moreira (2020)
- (Brazil) Augusto César (2020–21)
- (Brazil) Glauber Ramos (interim; 2021)
- (Brazil) Pintado (2021)
- (Brazil) Marcelo Cabo (2021)
- (Brazil) Glauber Ramos (interim; 2021–22)
- (Brazil) Bruno Pivetti (2022)
- (Brazil) Glauber Ramos (interim; 2022)
- (Brazil) Jair Ventura (2022)
- (Brazil) Guto Ferreira (2023)
- (Portugal) Armando Evangelista (2023)
- (Brazil) Mário Henrique (interim; 2023)
- (Brazil) Zé Ricardo (2024)
- (Brazil) Márcio Zanardi (2024)
- (Brazil) Vagner Mancini (2024–)
