= Taça Brahma dos Campeões =

1992 Taça Brahma
Tournament details
- Country: Brazil
- Teams: 2

Final positions
- Champions: Flamengo
- Runners-up: Paraná Clube

Tournament statistics
- Matches played: 1
- Goals scored: 4 (4 per match)

The Taça Brahma de Campeões (English: Brahma Champions Cup), also known as Taça Brahma or Supercopa do Brasil de 1992, was an unofficial football super cup tournament held in the year of 1992. Instead of counting on the duel between the winner of the Brazilian league and the 1992 Copa do Brasil champions (SC Internacional), it brought together the winners of Série A and Série B (first and second level of Brazilian football) in that year. The name was offered by the sponsorship of the Ambev Brewery.

== Participants ==
Club	Criteria
Flamengo	1992 Campeonato Brasileiro Série A winners
Paraná	1992 Campeonato Brasileiro Série B winners

== Match ==
Aug 12

Paraná (Paraná (state))	2–2	(Rio de Janeiro (state)) Flamengo
Adoílson 10'; João Antônio 86'	Report	Paulo Nunes 74'; Zinho 80' (pen.)
Penalties
Adoílson (penalty missed); Gralak (penalty scored); Maurilio (penalty scored); Ednelson (penalty scored); Saulo (penalty missed)	3–4	Zinho (penalty scored); Marcelinho (penalty scored); Rogério (penalty scored); Luís Antônio (penalty scored)

Pinheirão, Curitiba
Attendance: 15,000
Referee: Bráulio Zanoto

== See also ==
- Supercopa do Brasil
