= 1965 São Paulo FC season =

São Paulo
1965 season
- Chairman: Laudo Natel
- Manager: José Poy; Jim López
- Torneio Rio-São Paulo: 6th
- Campeonato Paulista: 5th

The 1965 football season was São Paulo's 36th season since club's existence.

== Overall ==
Games played	74 (16 Torneio Rio-São Paulo, 40 Campeonato Paulista, 18 Friendly match)
Games won	31 (8 Torneio Rio-São Paulo, 13 Campeonato Paulista, 10 Friendly match)
Games drawn	16 (2 Torneio Rio-São Paulo, 7 Campeonato Paulista, 7 Friendly match)
Games lost	17 (6 Torneio Rio-São Paulo, 10 Campeonato Paulista, 1 Friendly match)
Goals scored	119
Goals conceded	83
Goal difference	+36
Best result	8–0 (H) v Noroeste - Campeonato Paulista - 1965.11.07
Worst result	0–5 (A) v Botafogo - Torneio Rio-São Paulo - 1965.05.15; 0–5 (A) v Palmeiras - Torneio Rio-São Paulo - 1965.05.19
Most appearances	
Top scorer	

Source: São Paulo FC

== Friendlies ==
January 27 National	CRB	1–1	São Paulo	Maceió
	Goal		Goal	Stadium: Estádio Severiano Gomes Filho (Pajuçara)

February 13 National	Volkswagen Clube	3–4	São Paulo	São Bernardo do Campo
	Goal		Goal	Stadium: Estádio Volkswagen Clube (Vila do Tanque)

February 13 National	Portuguesa	1–1	São Paulo	Belém
	Goal		Goal	Stadium: Estádio Evandro Almeida (Baenão)

April 11 National	Anápolis	1–4	São Paulo	Anápolis
	Goal		Goal	Stadium: Estádio Jonas Duarte

May 12 National	São José	2–3	São Paulo	São José dos Campos
	Goal		Goal

May 27 National	Figueirense	0–0	São Paulo	Florianópolis
				Stadium: Estádio Adolfo Konder

May 30 Taça Laudo Natel	América-AM	0–7	São Paulo	Manaus
			Goal	Stadium: Estádio Vivaldo Lima (Vivaldão)

June 5 National	Guarani	2–3	São Paulo	Campinas
	Goal		Goal	Stadium: Estádio Brinco de Ouro da Princesa

June 13 National	Botafogo	2–2	São Paulo	Ribeirão Preto
	Goal		Goal	Stadium: Estádio Luís Pereira (Vila Tibério)

June 17 National	São Bento	1–1	São Paulo	Sorocaba
	Goal		Goal	Stadium: Estádio Humberto Reale

June 27 National	Noroeste	1–2	São Paulo	Bauru
	Goal		Goal	Stadium: Estádio Doutor Alfredo de Castilho

July 29 National	Seleto	0–1	São Paulo	Paranaguá
			Goal

August 17 National	Flamengo	0–1	São Paulo	Salvador
			Goal	Stadium: Estádio Octávio Mangabeira (Fonte Nova)

November 21 National	Monte Alegre	1–3	São Paulo	São Caetano do Sul
	Goal		Goal

December 8 National	São Paulo-PR	1–2	São Paulo	Londrina
	Goal		Goal

=== Torneio Pentagonal do Recife ===
June 15 National	Sport	1–1	São Paulo	Recife
	Fernando 70'		Dias 67'	Stadium: Estádio Eládio de Barros Carvalho (dos Aflitos); Referee: Nelson Brito de Oliveira

June 17 National	Santa Cruz	0–0	São Paulo	Recife
				Stadium: Estádio Adelmar da Costa Carvalho (Ilha do Retiro); Referee: Sebastião Rufino

June 19 National	Corinthians	0–1	São Paulo	Recife
			Zé Roberto 10'	Stadium: Estádio Adelmar da Costa Carvalho (Ilha do Retiro); Referee: Alfredo Bernardes Torres

June 24 National	Náutico	2–1	São Paulo	Recife
	Nado 48', 78'		Ede 12'	Stadium: Estádio Adelmar da Costa Carvalho (Ilha do Retiro)

== Official competitions ==
=== Torneio Rio-São Paulo ===
February 17 First stage 1	São Paulo	3–0	Portuguesa	São Paulo
	Goal			Stadium: Estádio Municipal Paulo Machado de Carvalho (Pacaembu)

February 21 First stage 2	São Paulo	0–2	Flamengo	São Paulo
			Goal	Stadium: Estádio Municipal Paulo Machado de Carvalho (Pacaembu)

February 27 First stage 3	Palmeiras	2–0	São Paulo	São Paulo
	Goal			Stadium: Estádio Municipal Paulo Machado de Carvalho (Pacaembu)

March 7 First stage 4	São Paulo	2–2	Corinthians	São Paulo
	Goal		Goal	Stadium: Estádio Municipal Paulo Machado de Carvalho (Pacaembu)

March 14 First stage 5	Botafogo	2–1	São Paulo	Rio de Janeiro
	Goal		Goal	Stadium: Estádio Jornalista Mário Filho (Maracanã)

March 20 First stage 6	São Paulo	3–0	Fluminense	São Paulo
	Goal			Stadium: Estádio Municipal Paulo Machado de Carvalho (Pacaembu)

March 27 First stage 7	São Paulo	3–1	Santos	São Paulo
	Goal		Goal	Stadium: Estádio Municipal Paulo Machado de Carvalho (Pacaembu)

April 3 First stage 8	São Paulo	2–2	America-RJ	São Paulo
	Goal		Goal	Stadium: Estádio Municipal Paulo Machado de Carvalho (Pacaembu)

April 7 First stage 9	Vasco da Gama	2–1	São Paulo	Rio de Janeiro
	Goal		Goal	Stadium: Estádio Jornalista Mário Filho (Maracanã)

April 24 Second stage 1	São Paulo	2–1	Corinthians	São Paulo
	Goal		Goal	Stadium: Estádio Municipal Paulo Machado de Carvalho (Pacaembu)

April 28 Second stage 2	São Paulo	4–2	Portuguesa	São Paulo
	Goal		Goal	Stadium: Estádio Municipal Paulo Machado de Carvalho (Pacaembu)

May 1 Second stage 3	Flamengo	3–2	São Paulo	Rio de Janeiro
	Goal		Goal	Stadium: Estádio Jornalista Mário Filho (Maracanã)

May 9 Second stage 4	São Paulo	4–1	Vasco da Gama	São Paulo
	Goal		Goal	Stadium: Estádio Municipal Paulo Machado de Carvalho (Pacaembu)

May 15 Second stage 5	Botafogo	5–0	São Paulo	Rio de Janeiro
	Goal			Stadium: Estádio Jornalista Mário Filho (Maracanã)

May 19 Second stage 6	Palmeiras	5–0	São Paulo	São Paulo
	Goal			Stadium: Estádio Municipal Paulo Machado de Carvalho (Pacaembu)

May 22 Second stage 7	São Paulo	5–3	Fluminense	São Paulo
	Goal		Goal	Stadium: Estádio Municipal Paulo Machado de Carvalho (Pacaembu)

==== Record ====
Final Position	Points	Matches	Wins	Draws	Losses	Goals For	Goals Away	Win%
6th	16	16	7	2	7	32	33	50%

=== Campeonato Paulista ===
July 13 1	São Paulo	3–2	Prudentina	São Paulo
	Goal		Goal	Stadium: Estádio Municipal Paulo Machado de Carvalho (Pacaembu)

July 18 2	São Paulo	1–2	Corinthians	São Paulo
	Goal		Goal	Stadium: Estádio Cícero Pompeu de Toledo (Morumbi)

July 21 3	São Paulo	3–1	Guarani	São Paulo
	Goal		Goal	Stadium: Estádio Cícero Pompeu de Toledo (Morumbi)

July 25 4	Juventus	2–1	São Paulo	São Paulo
	Goal		Goal	Stadium: Estádio Conde Crespi (Rua Javari)

August 1 5	Santos	1–1	São Paulo	São Paulo
	Goal		Goal	Stadium: Estádio Cícero Pompeu de Toledo (Morumbi)

August 8 6	Palmeiras	1–0	São Paulo	São Paulo
	Goal			Stadium: Estádio Cícero Pompeu de Toledo (Morumbi)

August 11 7	Botafogo	4–1	São Paulo	Ribeirão Preto
	Goal		Goal	Stadium: Estádio Luís Pereira (Vila Tibério)

August 14 8	São Paulo	2–2	Comercial	São Paulo
	Goal		Goal	Stadium: Estádio Cícero Pompeu de Toledo (Morumbi)

August 22 9	Noroeste	2–3	São Paulo	Bauru
	Goal		Goal	Stadium: Estádio Doutor Alfredo de Castilho

August 29 10	Portuguesa Santista	0–3	São Paulo	Santos
			Goal	Stadium: Estádio Urbano Caldeira (Vila Belmiro)

September 1 11	São Paulo	0–0	São Bento	São Paulo
				Stadium: Estádio Cícero Pompeu de Toledo (Morumbi)

September 4 12	Portuguesa	2–0	São Paulo	São Paulo
	Goal			Stadium: Estádio Cícero Pompeu de Toledo (Morumbi)

September 7 13	XV de Piracicaba	0–0	São Paulo	Piracicaba
				Stadium: Estádio Barão da Serra Negra

September 12 14	Ferroviária	0–1	São Paulo	Araraquara
			Goal	Stadium: Estádio Doutor Adhemar de Barros (Fonte Luminosa)

September 18 15	São Paulo	4–0	América	São Paulo
	Goal			Stadium: Estádio Cícero Pompeu de Toledo (Morumbi)

September 25 16	Prudentina	0–0	São Paulo	Presidente Prudente
				Stadium: Estádio Félix Ribeiro Marcondes

October 3 17	Corinthians	1–1	São Paulo	São Paulo
	Goal		Goal	Stadium: Estádio Municipal Paulo Machado de Carvalho (Pacaembu)

October 6 18	Guarani	0–2	São Paulo	Campinas
			Goal	Stadium: Estádio Brinco de Ouro da Princesa

October 10 19	São Paulo	3–1	Juventus	São Paulo
	Goal		Goal	Stadium: Estádio Cícero Pompeu de Toledo (Morumbi)

October 16 20	Santos	0–0	São Paulo	Santos
				Stadium: Estádio Urbano Caldeira (Vila Belmiro)

October 23 21	São Paulo	1–2	Palmeiras	São Paulo
	Goal		Goal	Stadium: Estádio Municipal Paulo Machado de Carvalho (Pacaembu)

October 28 22	São Paulo	2–1	Botafogo	São Paulo
	Goal		Goal	Stadium: Estádio Municipal Paulo Machado de Carvalho (Pacaembu)

October 31 23	Comercial	1–0	São Paulo	Ribeirão Preto
	Goal			Stadium: Estádio Doutor Francisco de Palma Travassos

November 7 24	São Paulo	8–0	Noroeste	São Paulo
	Goal			Stadium: Estádio Cícero Pompeu de Toledo (Morumbi)

November 12 25	São Paulo	6–1	Portuguesa Santista	São Paulo
	Goal		Goal	Stadium: Estádio Cícero Pompeu de Toledo (Morumbi)

November 24 26	Portuguesa	2–1	São Paulo	São Paulo
	Goal		Goal	Stadium: Estádio Municipal Paulo Machado de Carvalho (Pacaembu)

November 28 27	São Paulo	4–1	XV de Piracicaba	São Paulo
	Goal		Goal	Stadium: Estádio Cícero Pompeu de Toledo (Morumbi)

December 1 28	São Bento	2–0	São Paulo	Sorocaba
	Goal			Stadium: Estádio Humberto Reale

December 4 29	São Paulo	1–0	Ferroviária	São Paulo
	Goal			Stadium: Estádio Cícero Pompeu de Toledo (Morumbi)

December 12 30	América	1–0	São Paulo	São José do Rio Preto
	Goal			Stadium: Estádio Mário Alves de Mendonça

==== Record ====
Final Position	Points	Matches	Wins	Draws	Losses	Goals For	Goals Away	Win%
5th	33	30	13	7	10	52	32	55%
