= Otacílio Gonçalves =

Brazilian football manager (1940–2025)

Personal information
- Full name: Otacílio Gonçalves da Silva Junior
- Date of birth: 16 June 1940
- Place of birth: Santa Maria, Rio Grande do Sul, Brazil
- Date of death: 18 November 2025 (aged 85)
- Place of death: Porto Alegre, Rio Grande do Sul, Brazil

Managerial career
- Years: Team
- 1984–1985: Internacional
- 1985–1986: Atlético Paranaense
- 1987: Coritiba
- 1988: Grêmio
- 1989: Cerro Porteño
- 1989–1990: Kuwait
- 1991: Portuguesa
- 1991–1992: Paraná
- 1992–1993: Palmeiras
- 1994: Atlético Mineiro
- 1995: Paraná
- 1996–1997: Yokohama Flügels
- 1998: Internacional
- 1998: Paraná
- 1999: Gama
- 1999–2002: Santa Cruz
- 2002: Paraná

Otacílio Gonçalves da Silva Junior (16 June 1940 – 18 November 2025) was a Brazilian football manager.

== Managerial career ==
Gonçalves started his managerial career in Internacional, and later managed many Brazilian clubs, as well as the national teams of Kuwait and Japan.

Otacílio Gonçalves won the Campeonato Gaúcho twice, with Internacional (1984) and Grêmio (1988), and the Campeonato Paranaense four times, with Atlético Paranaense (1985), Pinheiros (1987), and Paraná (1991 and 1995).

== Death ==
Gonçalves died in Porto Alegre on 18 November 2025, at the age of 85.

== Managerial statistics ==
Team	From	To	Record				
Team	From	To	G	W	D	L	Win %
Yokohama Flügels	1996	1997	62	40	0	22	64.52
Total			62	40	0	22	64.52

== Honours ==
Internacional

- Campeonato Gaúcho: 1984

Atlético Paranaense

- Campeonato Paranaense: 1985

Grêmio

- Campeonato Gaúcho: 1988

Paraná

- Campeonato Paranaense: 1991, 1995
- Campeonato Brasileiro Série B: 1992
