= 1955 Campeonato Paulista =

Campeonato Paulista
- Season: 1955
- Champions: Santos
- Matches played: 182
- Goals scored: 699 (3.84 per match)
- Top goalscorer: Del Vecchio (Santos) – 23 goals
- Biggest home win: Portuguesa 8-0 Santos (November 13, 1955)
- Biggest away win: XV de Piracicaba 0-6 Palmeiras (October 9, 1955)
- Highest scoring: Santos 6-3 Ponte Preta (August 7, 1955); XV de Jaú 5-4 Corinthians (December 4, 1955)

The 1955 Campeonato Paulista da Primeira Divisão, organized by the Federação Paulista de Futebol, was the 54th season of São Paulo's top professional football league. Santos won the title for the second time. No teams were relegated. The top scorer was Santos's Del Vecchio with 23 goals.

== Championship ==
The championship was disputed in a double-round robin system, with the team with the most points winning the title.

| Pos | Team | Pld | W | D | L | GF | GA | GD | Pts | Qualification or relegation |
|---|---|---|---|---|---|---|---|---|---|---|
| 1 | Santos | 26 | 19 | 2 | 5 | 71 | 40 | +31 | 40 | Champions |
| 2 | Corinthians | 26 | 18 | 3 | 5 | 54 | 32 | +22 | 39 | |
| 3 | São Paulo | 26 | 16 | 6 | 4 | 72 | 37 | +35 | 38 | |
| 4 | Palmeiras | 26 | 15 | 5 | 6 | 60 | 43 | +17 | 35 | |
| 5 | Portuguesa | 26 | 13 | 3 | 10 | 61 | 47 | +14 | 29 | |
| 6 | Guarani | 26 | 11 | 5 | 10 | 48 | 44 | +4 | 27 | |
| 7 | XV de Jaú | 26 | 6 | 10 | 10 | 45 | 49 | −4 | 22 | |
| 8 | Taubaté | 26 | 7 | 7 | 12 | 48 | 50 | −2 | 21 | |
| 9 | Ponte Preta | 26 | 7 | 7 | 12 | 44 | 52 | −8 | 21 | |
| 10 | XV de Piracicaba | 26 | 8 | 5 | 13 | 50 | 64 | −14 | 21 | |
| 11 | São Bento de São Caetano | 26 | 7 | 6 | 13 | 37 | 58 | −21 | 20 | |
| 12 | Linense | 26 | 5 | 9 | 12 | 37 | 59 | −22 | 19 | |
| 13 | Noroeste | 26 | 4 | 9 | 13 | 39 | 57 | −18 | 17 | |
| 14 | Jabaquara | 26 | 5 | 5 | 16 | 33 | 67 | −34 | 15 | |

Updated to match(es) played on May 31, 1956. Source: RSSSF.com
Rules for classification: 1) points; 2) goal difference; 3) wins; 4) number of goals scored.

== Top Scores ==
| Rank | Player | Club | Goals |
|---|---|---|---|
| 1 | Emanuele Del Vecchio | Santos | 23 |
| 2 | Guerra | XV de Piracicaba | 18 |
| 3 | Humberto Tozzi | Palmeiras | 15 |
| 4 | Zezinho | São Paulo | 14 |
| 5 | Vasconcelos | Santos | 13 |
| 5 | Gino | São Paulo | 13 |
| 5 | Colombo | Noroeste | 13 |
| 8 | Álvaro | Santos | 12 |
| 8 | Augusto | Guarani | 12 |
| 8 | Baltasar | Ponte Preta | 12 |
| 8 | Berto | Taubaté | 12 |
| 8 | Ipojucan | Portuguesa | 12 |
| 8 | Paulo Carvoeiro | Corinthians | 12 |
