= 1915 Football Championship Paranaense =

Campeonato Paranaense
- Season: 1915
- Dates: 23 May 1915 - 7 November 1915
- Champions: Internacional
- Runner up: Paraná
- Matches: 24
- Goals: 90 (3.75 per match)
- Average goals/game: 3,75
- Top goalscorer: Ivo Leão (Internacional) (14 goals)

The 1915 Soccer Paranaense Championship (in Portuguese: Campeonato Paranaense de Futebol de 1915) was the first championship edition of the Brazilian state of Paraná and southern Brazil.

The winner this year was the International Football Club. It was a club of Curitiba, extinct since 1924.

== Teams ==
Team	City
América	Curitiba
Coritiba	Curitiba
Internacional	Curitiba
Paraná	Curitiba
Paranaguá	Paranaguá
Rio Branco	Paranaguá

== Championship ==
Pos	Team	Pld	W	D	L	GF	GA	GD	Pts	Qualification or relegation
1	Internacional	10	9	0	1	26	7	+19	18	Champions
2	Paraná	10	7	1	2	18	5	+13	15	
3	América	10	5	1	4	15	14	+1	11	
4	Coritiba	10	3	3	4	14	12	+2	9	
5	Rio Branco	10	1	2	7	8	16	−8	4	
6	Paranaguá	10	1	1	8	12	39	−27	3	

Updated to match(es) played on June 5, 2026. Source: RSSSF.com
Rules for classification: 1) points; 2) goal difference; 3) wins; 4) head-to-head points.

== Other websites ==
- Federação Paranaense de Futebol 1915 championship (in Portuguese)
