= Lori Sandri =

Brazilian football manager (1949-2014)

Personal information
- Full name: Lori Paulo Sandri
- Date of birth: 29 January 1949
- Place of birth: Encantado, Brazil
- Date of death: 3 October 2014 (aged 65)
- Place of death: Curitiba, Brazil
- Position: Midfielder

Youth career
- 1964: Encantado (RS)
- 1965: Internacional
- 1966–1968: Água Verde (PR)

Senior career*
Years	Team	Apps	(Gls)
1969	Rio Branco (PR)		
1970	Seleto		
1971–1972	Atlético Paranaense		
1973	Londrina		
1974–1976	Pinheiros-PR		

Managerial career
- 1977–1978: Uberaba
- 1978: Chapecoense
- 1979: Atlético Paranaense
- 1981: Criciúma
- 1982: Botafogo-SP
- 1983: Atlético Paranaense
- 1984: Santa Cruz
- 1985–1986: Guarani
- 1986: Inter de Limeira
- 1987: Criciúma
- 1988–1989: Al-Shabab
- 1990: Al-Ettifaq
- 1991: Criciúma
- 1992–1993: Al-Shabab
- 1994: Criciúma
- 1994: Al-Ettifaq
- 1995: Internacional
- 1995: Coritiba
- 1995: Sport
- 1996: Al Ain
- 1997: United Arab Emirates
- 1998: Juventude
- 1998: United Arab Emirates
- 1999: Al-Hilal
- 2000: Coritiba
- 2001: Botafogo-SP
- 2001: Goiás
- 2002–2003: Tokyo Verdy
- 2003: Vitória
- 2003: Criciúma
- 2004: Guarani
- 2004: Criciúma
- 2004: Internacional
- 2005: Paraná
- 2005–2006: Atlético Mineiro
- 2007: América de Natal
- 2007: Paraná
- 2007: Sertãozinho
- 2008–2009: Marítimo
- 2010: Santa Cruz
- 2011: Noroeste
- 2012: Botafogo-SP
- * Club domestic league appearances and goals

Lori Paulo Sandri (29 January 1949 – 3 October 2014) was a Brazilian football manager.

== Coaching career ==
He previously managed Atlético Paranaense, Criciúma, Santa Cruz, Guarani, Al-Shabab, Al-Ettifaq, Internacional, Coritiba, Al Ain, the United Arab Emirates national team, Juventude, Al-Hilal, Botafogo (SP), Goiás, Tokyo Verdy, Vitória, Paraná, América (RN) and Sertãozinho.

== Managerial statistics ==
Team	From	To	Record				
Team	From	To	G	W	D	L	Win %
Tokyo Verdy	2002	2003	30	13	2	15	43.33
Total			30	13	2	15	43.33

== Death ==
Lori Sandri died, aged 65, of a brain tumour in October 2014.

== See also ==
- List of football managers with the most matches
