= Clube Atlético Ferroviário =

Ferroviário
- Full name: Clube Atlético Ferroviário
- Nickname: Boca-Negra
- Founded: January 12, 1930
- Dissolved: 1971
- Ground: Durival Britto, Curitiba, Brazil
- Capacity: 20,000
Home colours	Away colours

Clube Atlético Ferroviário, commonly known as Ferroviário, were a Brazilian football team from Curitiba, Paraná state. They won the Campeonato Paranaense eight times.

== History ==
Clube Atlético Ferroviário were founded on January 12, 1930. They won the Campeonato Paranaense in 1937, 1938, 1944, 1948, 1950, 1953, 1965, and in 1966. The club merged with Britânia Sport Club and Palestra Itália Futebol Clube in 1971, forming Colorado Esporte Clube. Subsequently, it joined Esporte Clube Pinheiros (PR), forming Paraná Clube.

== Stadium ==
Clube Atlético Ferroviário played their home games at Estádio Durival Britto. The stadium has a maximum capacity of 20,000 people.

== Honours ==
=== State ===
- Campeonato Paranaense
  - Winners (8): 1937, 1938, 1944, 1948, 1950, 1953, 1965, 1966

=== City ===
- Taça Cidade de Curitiba
  - Winners (3): 1948, 1949, 1950
