= América Paraná Sport Club =

América-Paraná
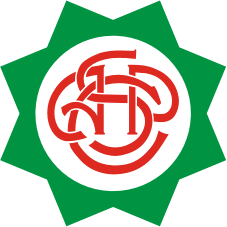
- Full name: América Paraná Sport Club
- Founded: 1917
- Dissolved: 1919
- Ground: Chacará dos Macedos, Curitiba
- Capacity: 5,000
Home colours	Away colours

The América Paraná Sport Club (also América-Paraná ...) was an association football club from Curitiba, the capital of the Brazilian state of Paraná.

The club was established before the state championship of Paraná of 1917 through a merger of the América Foot-Ball Club, founded in 1914, and the Paraná Sport Club, founded in 1910 by employees of the American South Brazilian Engineering Company after their transfer from Ponta Grossa, ca. 100 km northwest of Curitiba, to the capital, to create a credible force against the then prevailing teams of the Coritiba Foot Ball Club and the Internacional Futebol Clube.

The new club won the championship of the new joint league of Paraná, the Associação Sportiva Paranaense, of 1917, leaving the title holders Coritiba behind on second place. América-Paraná's Gaeta was top scorer with nine goals. In 1918 the club finished on the fifth place amongst six participants and in February 1919, before start of the new championship, the merger was undone.

The América FBC participated in the state championship until 1922 and merged before the 1924 competition with Internacional to form today's Clube Atlético Paranaense. The Paraná SC rejoined the state championship in 1920 and ceased operations during the 1926 competition and dissolved itself.

== Honours ==
- Campeonato Paranaense
  - Winners (1): 1917
