= Palestra Itália =

Palestra Italia may refer to:

- Sociedade Esportiva Palmeiras, a club from São Paulo city, São Paulo state (1914)
  - Estádio Palestra Itália, the official name of Palmeiras' former stadium, usually known as Estádio Parque Antártica
- Cruzeiro Esporte Clube, a club from Belo Horizonte, Minas Gerais state (1921)
- Palestra Itália Futebol Clube, a defunct Brazilian football club from Curitiba, Paraná state
