= Baltasar (footballer, born 1933) =

Brazilian footballer (1933–2019)

Personal information
- Full name: Egydio Felizardo
- Date of birth: 20 September 1933
- Place of birth: Chavantes, Brazil
- Date of death: 23 December 2019 (aged 86)
- Place of death: Campinas, Brazil
- Position: Forward

Senior career*
Years	Team	Apps	(Gls)
1953	Juventus		
1954–1956	Ponte Preta		
1957	São Paulo	26	(6)
1957–1958	Taubaté		
1958–1962	Comercial-PR		
1963	Grêmio Maringá		
1963	Ponte Preta		
- * Club domestic league appearances and goals as of 21 October 2023

Egydio Felizardo (20 September 1933 – 23 December 2019), better known by the nickname Baltasar, was a Brazilian professional footballer who played as a forward.

== Career ==
Started his career at Juventus and then moved to Ponte Preta, a club where he would become the sixth highest scorer. He was champion of São Paulo in 1957 with São Paulo FC, and then for several years he played for Comercial de Cornélio Procópio, where he would become champion of Paraná in 1961. In 1963, he repeated the feat, this time with Grêmio Maringá.

He received the nickname "Baltasar" due to his physical resemblance to Baltazar.

== Honours ==
São Paulo

- Campeonato Paulista: 1957

Comercial-PR

- Campeonato Paranaense: 1961

Grêmio Maringá

- Campeonato Paranaense: 1963
