= 1965 in Brazilian football =

Football in Brazil
- Season: 1965

The following article presents a summary of the 1965 football (soccer) season in Brazil, which was the 64th season of competitive football in the country.

== Taça Brasil ==
Semifinals

Team 1	Agg.	Team 2	1st leg	2nd leg
Náutico	2-3	Vasco da Gama	2-2	0-1
Santos	5-3	Palmeiras	4-2	1-1

Final

November 30, 1964

Santos	5–1	Vasco da Gama

December 7, 1964

Vasco da Gama	0–1	Santos

Santos declared as the Taça Brasil champions by aggregate score of 6–1.

== Torneio Rio-São Paulo ==
Final Standings

Position	Team	Points	Played	Won	Drawn	Lost	For	Against	Difference
1	Palmeiras	27	16	12	3	1	49	20	29
2	Vasco da Gama	17	16	7	3	6	24	22	2
3	Botafogo	17	16	7	3	6	31	31	0
4	Flamengo	17	16	6	5	5	19	21	-2
5	Portuguesa	17	16	5	7	4	20	24	-4
6	São Paulo	16	16	7	2	7	32	33	-1
7	Corinthians	15	16	4	7	5	29	27	2
8	Fluminense	10	16	3	4	9	29	27	-8
9	Santos	8	9	3	2	4	20	24	-4
10	America-RJ	2	9	0	2	7	8	22	-14

Palmeiras won both stages of the competition, thus no final was played, and the club was declared as Torneio Rio-São Paulo champions.

== State championship champions ==
State	Champion	State	Champion
Acre	Vasco-AC	Pará	Paysandu
Alagoas	CSA	Paraíba	Campinense
Amapá	Santana	Paraná	Ferroviário-PR
Amazonas	Rio Negro	Pernambuco	Náutico
Bahia	Vitória	Piauí	Flamengo-PI
Ceará	Fortaleza	Rio de Janeiro	Americano
Distrito Federal	Pederneiras	Rio Grande do Norte	ABC
Espírito Santo	Desporitva	Rio Grande do Sul	Grêmio
Goiás	Anápolis	Rondônia	Flamengo-RO
Guanabara	Flamengo	Roraima	-
Maranhão	Sampaio Corrêa	Santa Catarina	Inter de Lages
Mato Grosso	Mixto	São Paulo	Santos
Mato Grosso do Sul	-	Sergipe	Confiança
Minas Gerais	Cruzeiro	Tocantins	-

== Brazilian clubs in international competitions ==
Team	Copa Libertadores 1965
Santos	Semifinals

== Brazil national team ==
The following table lists all the games played by the Brazil national football team in official competitions and friendly matches during 1965.

Date	Opposition	Result	Score	Brazil scorers	Competition
June 2, 1965	Belgium	W	5-0	Pelé (3), Flávio, Rinaldo	International Friendly
June 6, 1965	West Germany	W	2-0	Pelé, Flávio	International Friendly
June 9, 1965	Argentina	D	0-0	-	International Friendly
June 17, 1965	Algeria	W	3-0	Pelé, Dudu, Gérson	International Friendly
June 24, 1965	Portugal	D	0-0	-	International Friendly
June 30, 1965	Sweden	W	2-1	Pelé, Gérson	International Friendly
July 4, 1965	Soviet Union	W	3-0	Pelé (2), Flávio	International Friendly
September 7, 1965	Uruguay	W	3-0	Rinaldo, Tupãzinho, Germano	International Friendly
November 16, 1965	(England) Arsenal	L	0-2	-	International Friendly (unofficial match)
November 21, 1965	Soviet Union	D	2-2	Gérson, Pelé	International Friendly
November 21, 1965	Hungary	W	5-3	Servílio (2), Lima, Abel, Nair	International Friendly
