= 1955 São Paulo FC season =

São Paulo
1955 season
- Chairman: Cícero Pompeu de Toledo
- Manager: Leônidas da Silva; Vicente Feola
- Torneio Rio-São Paulo: 9th
- Campeonato Paulista: 3rd

The 1955 football season was São Paulo's 26th season since club's existence.

== Overall ==
Games played	60 (9 Torneio Rio-São Paulo, 26 Campeonato Paulista, 25 Friendly match)
Games won	28 (2 Torneio Rio-São Paulo, 16 Campeonato Paulista, 10 Friendly match)
Games drawn	19 (2 Torneio Rio-São Paulo, 6 Campeonato Paulista, 11 Friendly match)
Games lost	13 (5 Torneio Rio-São Paulo, 4 Campeonato Paulista, 4 Friendly match)
Goals scored	129
Goals conceded	79
Goal difference	+50
Best result	6–1 (H) v Linense – Campeonato Paulista – 1955.12.17
Worst result	1–4 (A) v La Salle – Friendly match – 1955.07.16
Most appearances	
Top scorer	

Source: São Paulo FC

== Friendlies ==
March 20 National	Náutico	0–0	São Paulo	Recife

March 24 National	Sport Recife	0–0	São Paulo	Recife

March 27 National	Santa Cruz / América	2–2	São Paulo	Recife
				Stadium: Ilha do Retiro

April 17 National	Araguari	3–2	São Paulo	Araguari
	Goal		Goal

April 21 National	São Bento	0–1	São Paulo	Sorocaba
			Goal	Stadium: Campo da Rua Coronel Nogueira Padilha

May 29 International	Club América (Mexico)	0–0	(Brazil) São Paulo	Ciudad de México
				Stadium: Estadio Olímpico de la Ciudad de los Deportes

June 2 International	Guadalajara (Mexico)	0–4	(Brazil) São Paulo	Ciudad de México
			Goal

June 5 International	Toluca (Mexico)	1–0	(Brazil) São Paulo	Ciudad de México
	Goal

June 9 International	Necaxa (Mexico)	1–1	(Brazil) São Paulo	Ciudad de México
	Goal		Goal

June 12 International	Zacatepec (Mexico)	1–1	(Brazil) São Paulo	Ciudad de México
	Goal		Goal

June 15 Trofeo Jarrito	León (Mexico)	1–4	(Brazil) São Paulo	Ciudad de México
	Goal		Goal

June 20 Trofeo Jarrito	Necaxa (Mexico)	1–4	(Brazil) São Paulo	Ciudad de México
	Goal		Goal

June 26 International	Atlético Nacional (Colombia)	2–2	(Brazil) São Paulo	Medellín
	Goal		Goal	Stadium: Estadio Atanasio Girardot

June 29 International	Independiente Medellín (Colombia)	1–1	(Brazil) São Paulo	Medellín
	Goal		Goal	Stadium: Estadio Atanasio Girardot

July 3 International	Atlético Nacional (Colombia)	0–3	(Brazil) São Paulo	Medellín
			Goal	Stadium: Estadio Atanasio Girardot

July 6 International	Boca Juniors de Cali (Colombia)	0–2	(Brazil) São Paulo	Cali
			Goal

July 10 International	Millonarios (Colombia)	2–2	(Brazil) São Paulo	Bogotá
	Goal		Goal	Stadium: Estadio Nemesio Camacho (El Campín)

August 20 National	Juventus	1–5	São Paulo	São Paulo
	Goal		Goal	Stadium: Estádio Conde Rodolfo Crespi (Rua Javari)

December 28 National	Grêmio	2–1	São Paulo	Porto Alegre
	Goal		Goal

=== Pequeña Taça del Mundo ===
July 16 International	La Salle (Venezuela)	4–1	(Brazil) São Paulo	Caracas
	Goal		Goal	Stadium: Estadio Universitario

July 21 International	Benfica (Portugal)	0–0	(Brazil) São Paulo	Caracas
				Stadium: Estadio Universitario

July 24 International	Valencia (Spain)	0–2	(Brazil) São Paulo	Caracas
			Goal	Stadium: Estadio Universitario

July 26 International	Benfica (Portugal)	2–4	(Brazil) São Paulo	Caracas
	Goal		Goal	Stadium: Estadio Universitario

July 30 International	La Salle (Venezuela)	1–3	(Brazil) São Paulo	Caracas
	Goal		Goal	Stadium: Estadio Universitario

August 4 International	Valencia (Spain)	1–1	(Brazil) São Paulo	Caracas
	Goal		Goal	Stadium: Estadio Universitario

== Official competitions ==
=== Torneio Rio-São Paulo ===
April 6 1	Santos	2–0	São Paulo	São Paulo
	Goal			Stadium: Estádio Municipal Paulo Machado de Carvalho (Pacaembu)

April 10 2	Vasco da Gama	1–2	São Paulo	Rio de Janeiro
	Goal		Goal	Stadium: Estádio Municipal do Rio de Janeiro (Maracanã)

April 20 3	Portuguesa	2–0	São Paulo	São Paulo
	Goal			Stadium: Estádio Municipal Paulo Machado de Carvalho (Pacaembu)

April 24 4	São Paulo	1–1	America-RJ	São Paulo
	Goal		Goal	Stadium: Estádio Municipal Paulo Machado de Carvalho (Pacaembu)

April 28 5	São Paulo	4–3	Corinthians	São Paulo
	Goal		Goal	Stadium: Estádio Municipal Paulo Machado de Carvalho (Pacaembu)

May 5 6	Palmeiras	1–0	São Paulo	São Paulo
	Goal			Stadium: Estádio Municipal Paulo Machado de Carvalho (Pacaembu)

May 8 7	Botafogo	1–1	São Paulo	Rio de Janeiro
	Goal		Goal	Stadium: Estádio Municipal do Rio de Janeiro (Maracanã)

May 12 8	São Paulo	2–3	Flamengo	São Paulo
	Goal		Goal	Stadium: Estádio Municipal Paulo Machado de Carvalho (Pacaembu)

May 14 9	São Paulo	1–2	Fluminense	São Paulo
	Goal		Goal	Stadium: Estádio Municipal Paulo Machado de Carvalho (Pacaembu)

==== Record ====
Final Position	Points	Matches	Wins	Draws	Losses	Goals For	Goals Away	Win%
9th	6	9	2	2	5	11	16	33%

=== Campeonato Paulista ===
August 14 1	São Paulo	3–0	Guarani	São Paulo
	Goal			Stadium: Estádio Municipal Paulo Machado de Carvalho (Pacaembu)

August 17 2	São Paulo	3–0	XV de Piracicaba	São Paulo
	Goal			Stadium: Estádio Municipal Paulo Machado de Carvalho (Pacaembu)

August 28 3	XV de Jaú	1–2	São Paulo	Jaú
	Goal		Goal	Stadium: Artur Simões

September 4 4	Palmeiras	2–0	São Paulo	São Paulo
	Goal			Stadium: Estádio Municipal Paulo Machado de Carvalho (Pacaembu)

September 7 5	Santos	3–1	São Paulo	Santos
	Goal		Goal	Stadium: Estádio Urbano Caldeira (Vila Belmiro)

September 11 6	São Paulo	4–1	Ponte Preta	São Paulo
	Goal		Goal	Stadium: Estádio Municipal Paulo Machado de Carvalho (Pacaembu)

September 17 7	São Bento (São Caetano do Sul)	2–2	São Paulo	São Caetano do Sul
	Goal		Goal	Stadium: Anacleto Campanella

September 25 8	Taubaté	1–1	São Paulo	Taubaté
	Goal		Goal	Stadium: Praça Monsenhor Silva Barros

September 28 9	São Paulo	6–3	Noroeste	São Paulo
	Goal		Goal	Stadium: Estádio Municipal Paulo Machado de Carvalho (Pacaembu)

October 2 10	Corinthians	3–2	São Paulo	São Paulo
	Goal		Goal	Stadium: Estádio Municipal Paulo Machado de Carvalho (Pacaembu)

October 9 11	São Paulo	3–1	Portuguesa	São Paulo
	Goal		Goal	Stadium: Estádio Municipal Paulo Machado de Carvalho (Pacaembu)

October 12 12	São Paulo	5–3	Jabaquara	São Paulo
	Goal		Goal	Stadium: Estádio Municipal Paulo Machado de Carvalho (Pacaembu)

October 16 13	Linense	0–3	São Paulo	Lins
			Goal	Stadium: Gigante de Madeira

October 22 14	São Paulo	4–2	XV de Jaú	São Paulo
	Goal		Goal	Stadium: Estádio Municipal Paulo Machado de Carvalho (Pacaembu)

October 30 15	Noroeste	0–0	São Paulo	Bauru
				Stadium: Alfredo de Castilho

November 6 16	São Paulo	4–3	Portuguesa	São Paulo
	Goal		Goal	Stadium: Estádio Municipal Paulo Machado de Carvalho (Pacaembu)

November 13 17	Jabaquara	0–2	São Paulo	Santos
			Goal	Stadium: Estádio Ulrico Mursa

November 20 18	Ponte Preta	3–1	São Paulo	Campinas
	Goal		Goal	Stadium: Estádio Moisés Lucarelli

November 27 19	Santos	1–3	São Paulo	São Paulo
	Goal		Goal	Stadium: Estádio Municipal Paulo Machado de Carvalho (Pacaembu)

November 30 20	São Paulo	4–1	Taubaté	São Paulo
	Goal		Goal	Stadium: Estádio Municipal Paulo Machado de Carvalho (Pacaembu)

December 4 21	Guarani	2–2	São Paulo	Campinas
	Goal		Goal	Stadium: Estádio Brinco de Ouro da Princesa

December 11 22	Corinthians	1–1	São Paulo	São Paulo
	Goal		Goal	Stadium: Estádio Municipal Paulo Machado de Carvalho (Pacaembu)

December 17 23	São Paulo	6–1	Linense	São Paulo
	Goal		Goal	Stadium: Estádio Municipal Paulo Machado de Carvalho (Pacaembu)

December 24 24	São Paulo	3–0	São Bento (São Caetano do Sul)	São Paulo
	Goal			Stadium: Estádio Municipal Paulo Machado de Carvalho (Pacaembu)

January 8, 1956 25	São Paulo	2–2	Palmeiras	São Paulo
	Goal		Goal	Stadium: Estádio Municipal Paulo Machado de Carvalho (Pacaembu)

January 15, 1956 26	XV de Piracicaba	1–5	São Paulo	Piracicaba
	Goal		Goal	Stadium: Campo da Rua Regente Feijó

==== Record ====
Final Position	Points	Matches	Wins	Draws	Losses	Goals For	Goals Away	Win%
3rd	38	26	16	6	4	72	37	73%
