= Estádio Vila Capanema =

Football stadium in Curitiba, Brazil

Coordinates: 25°26′22″S 49°15′21″W

Vila Capanema
- Estádio Durival Britto e Silva
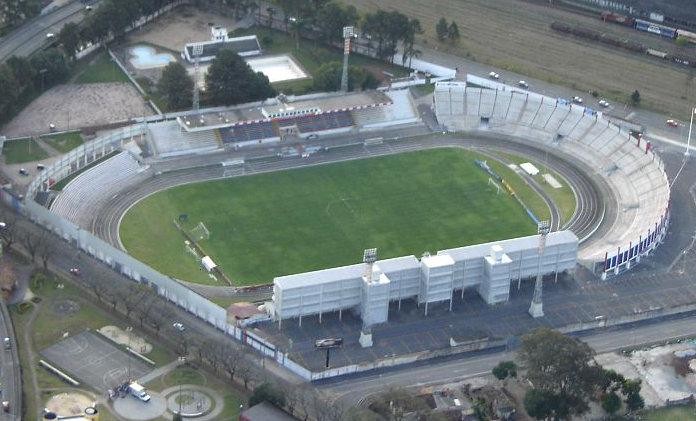
- Sisbrace
- Interactive map of Vila Capanema
- Location: Curitiba, Paraná, Brazil
- Owner: Paraná Clube
- Capacity: 20,000
- Surface: Grass
- Field size: 110 x 70m

Construction
- Opened: January 23, 1947

Tenants
- Clube Atlético Ferroviário (1947–1971); Colorado Esporte Clube (1971–1989); Paraná Clube (1989–present)

Estádio Durival Britto e Silva, better known as Estádio Vila Capanema (Portuguese for Capanema Borough Stadium), is the main stadium of Paraná Clube in Curitiba, Paraná, Brazil. The other stadium is Estádio Vila Olímpica, currently being used for training. The stadium holds 20,000 people. It was built under the leadership of Heron Wanderley, club president at that time and named after Colonel Durival Britto e Silva, who was president of the RFFSA, the Brazilian Federal railroad company.

== History ==
It was built in 1947 as a landmark event for Clube Atlético Ferroviário. Architect Rubens Maister of the Thá construction company designed the stadium, with the project presented by Reinaldo Thá to company superintendent Durival Britto e Silva and club president Heron Wanderley. The first match was played there on January 23 of that year, when Fluminense Football Club from Rio de Janeiro beat Clube Atlético Ferroviário 5–1; the first goal scored by Fluminense's Careca.

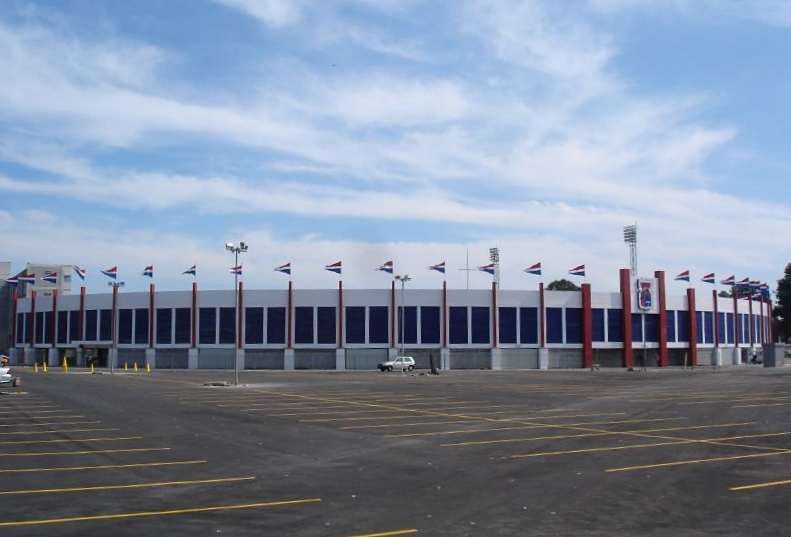
Estádio Vila Capanema

Upon its inauguration on January 23, 1947, Vila Capanema became the third-largest stadium in Brazil, surpassed only by Pacaembu in São Paulo and São Januário in Rio de Janeiro. The inaugural match, a friendly between Ferroviário and Fluminense, tested the stadium's lighting system, with Fluminense winning 5-1. Careca of Fluminense scored the first goal.

During many years Estádio Vila Capanema was Curitiba's most modern and comfortable stadium with a capacity of 15,000 spectators. It was used for the 1950 FIFA World Cup games. On June 25, 1950, Spain beat the United States of America and in the 29th day of that month, Paraguay and Sweden drew 2-2.

Clube Atlético Ferroviário ceased operation in 1971 and Vila Capanema became Paraná Clube's home since the foundation of the club in 1989.

In 2006, Estádio Vila Capanema was modernized and Paraná Clube opened the stadium again after four years. The capacity of the stadium was boosted to 20,083 fans. The American rock band Pearl Jam played at the stadium on November 9, 2011, as part of their 20th anniversary tour.

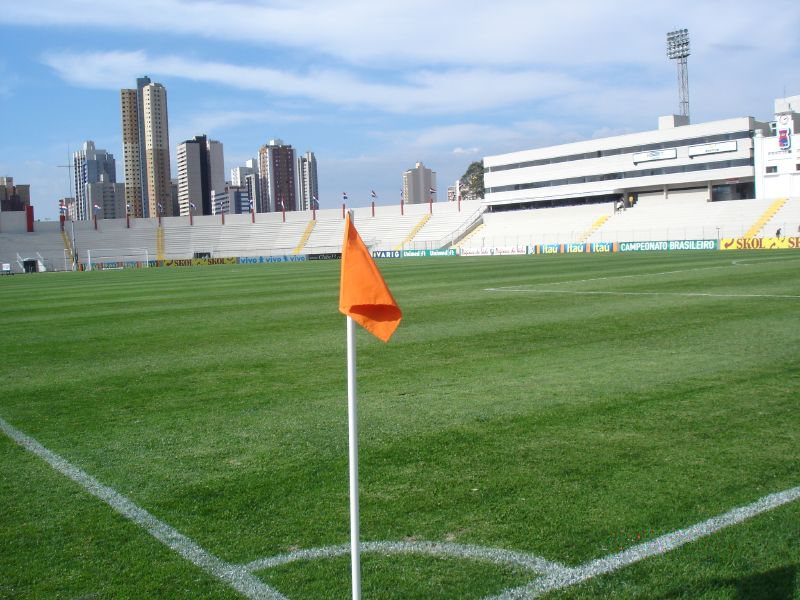
Estádio Vila Capanema
