= Colorado Esporte Clube =

Brazilian football club

Colorado
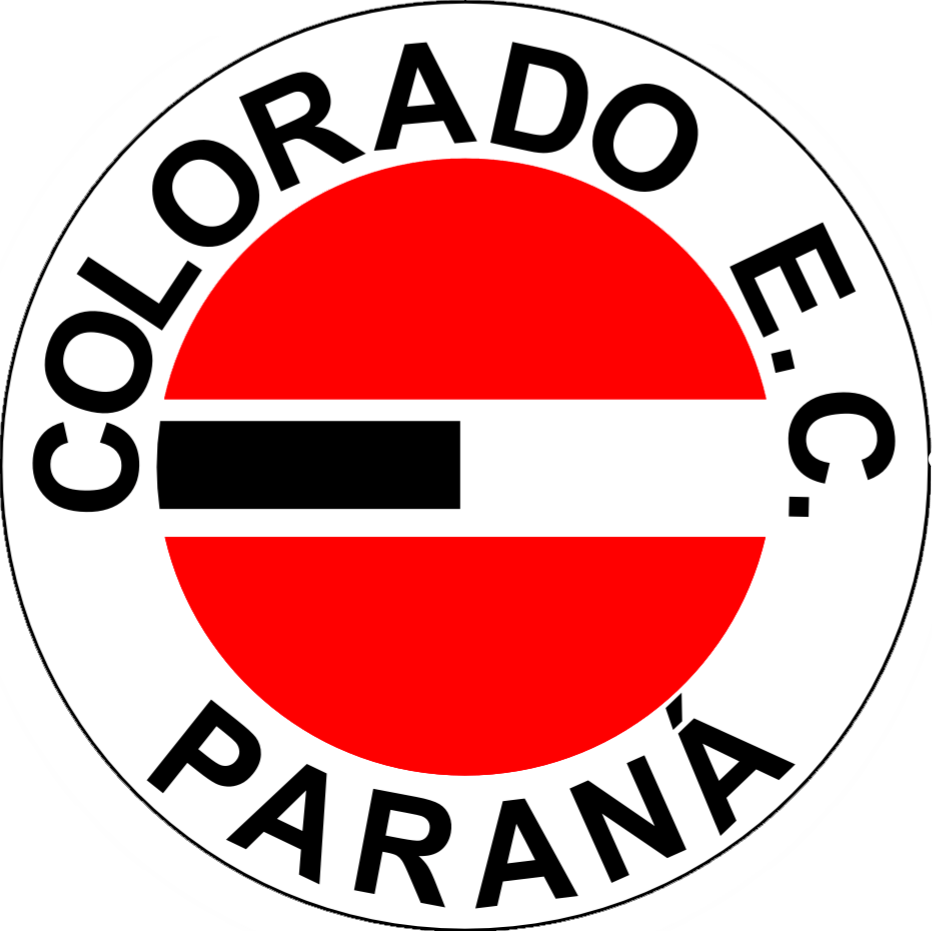
- Full name: Colorado Esporte Clube
- Nickname(s): Boca Negra
- Founded: June 29, 1971
- Dissolved: December 19, 1989; 35 years ago (merged with Esporte Clube Pinheiros to form Paraná Clube)
- Ground: Durival de Brito
- Capacity: 20,083
Home colors	Away colors

Colorado Esporte Clube, commonly known as Colorado, was a Brazilian football club from Curitiba. They won the Campeonato Paranaense once and competed in the Série A five times.

== History ==
Colorado Esporte Clube was founded on June 29, after the merger of Britânia Sport Club, Palestra Itália Futebol Clube and Clube Atlético Ferroviário. They competed for the first time in the Série A in 1978, when they finished in the 47th place, and were eliminated in the first stage. Colorado competed again in 1979, 1980, 1981 and in 1983 when they finished in the 31st, 19th, 20th and 15th place, making the last one in 1983 their best-ever position in the nationwide championship. Colorado won its only title, which is the Campeonato Paranaense, in 1980, sharing it with Cascavel.

Colorado merged with Esporte Clube Pinheiros on December 19, 1989 to form Paraná Clube.

== Honours ==
=== State ===
- Campeonato Paranaense
  - Winners (1): 1980
  - Runners-up (5): 1974, 1975, 1976, 1979, 1982

=== City ===
- Taça Cidade de Curitiba
  - Winners (2): 1974, 1975 (dedicated posthumously to Clemente Comandulli)

=== Handball ===
- Five times metropolitan champion, and twice state champion in handball.
