= Britânia Sport Club =

Britânia
- Full name: Britânia Sport Club
- Nickname(s): Tigre
- Founded: November 19, 1914
- Dissolved: 1971
- Ground: Paula Soares, Curitiba, Brazil
- Capacity: 4,000
Home colours	Away colours

Britânia Sport Club, commonly known as Britânia, were a Brazilian football team from Curitiba, Paraná state. They won the Campeonato Paranaense seven times.

== History ==
Britânia Sport Club were founded on November 19, 1914, when Leão Foot-Ball Club and Tigre Foot-Ball Club merged. They won the Campeonato Paranaense in 1918, 1919, 1920, 1921, 1922, 1923, and in 1928. The club merged with Palestra Itália Futebol Clube and Clube Atlético Ferroviário in 1971, forming Colorado Esporte Clube.

== Stadium ==
Britânia played their home games at Estádio Paula Soares Neto which had a maximum capacity of 4,000 people. The stadium was opened in 1943 with a match against Avaí – which was lost 1–4 – and demolished in 1998 to make way for a shopping center.

== Honours ==
=== State ===
- Campeonato Paranaense
  - Winners (7): 1918, 1919, 1920, 1921, 1922, 1923, 1928
  - Runners-up (1): 1916
- Torneio Início do Paraná
  - Winners (7): 1919, 1923, 1926, 1928, 1933, 1959, 1961

=== City ===
- Campeonato de Curitiba
  - Winners (2): 1923, 1928
- Torneio Relâmpago
  - Winners (1): 1949
