= 1955 in Brazilian football =

Football in Brazil
- Season: 1955

The following article presents a summary of the 1955 football (soccer) season in Brazil, which was the 54th season of competitive football in the country.

== Torneio Rio-São Paulo ==
Final Standings

Position	Team	Points	Played	Won	Drawn	Lost	For	Against	Difference
1	Portuguesa	13	9	5	3	1	26	15	11
2	Palmeiras	13	9	6	1	2	32	19	13
3	Botafogo	11	9	4	3	2	12	12	0
4	Flamengo	10	9	4	2	3	16	14	2
5	Santos	9	9	4	1	4	17	21	-4
6	América	9	9	3	3	3	18	24	-6
7	Vasco da Gama	7	9	2	3	4	15	15	0
8	Fluminense	7	9	3	1	5	15	21	-8
9	São Paulo	6	9	2	2	5	11	16	-5
10	Corinthians	5	9	1	3	5	18	23	-5

Championship playoff

May 29, 1955

Palmeiras	2–2	Portuguesa

June 5, 1955

Portuguesa	2–0	Palmeiras

Portuguesa declared as the Torneio Rio-São Paulo champions.

== State championship champions ==
State	Champion	State	Champion
Acre	Ro Branco-AC	Paraíba	Botafogo-PB
Alagoas	CSA	Paraná	Monte Alegre
Amapá	Macapá	Pernambuco	Sport Recife
Amazonas	Fast	Piauí	River
Bahia	Vitória	Rio de Janeiro	Frigorífico; Goytacaz^{(1)}
Ceará	Calouros do Ar	Rio de Janeiro (DF)	Flamengo
Espírito Santo	Santo Antônio	Rio Grande do Norte	ABC
Goiás	Atlético Goianiense	Rio Grande do Sul	Internacional
Maranhão	Moto Club	Rondônia	Ferroviário-RO
Mato Grosso	Atlético Matogrossense	Santa Catarina	Caxias-SC
Minas Gerais	Atlético Mineiro	São Paulo	Santos
Pará	Tuna Luso	Sergipe	Sergipe

^{(1)}Goytacaz won a competition named Supercampeonato (Superchampionship), which was an extra tournament.

== Brazil national team ==
The following table lists all the games played by the Brazil national football team in official competitions and friendly matches during 1955.

Date	Opposition	Result	Score	Brazil scorers	Competition
September 18, 1955	Chile	D	1-1	Pinheiro	Bernardo O'Higgins Cup
September 20, 1955	Chile	W	2-1	Maurinho, Álvaro	Bernardo O'Higgins Cup
November 13, 1955	Paraguay	W	2-1	Zizinho (2), Sabará	Taça Oswaldo Cruz
November 17, 1955	Paraguay	D	3-3	Maurinho, Canhoteiro, Humberto	Taça Oswaldo Cruz
