= Saulo de Freitas =

Brazilian footballer

Saulo
Personal information
- Full name: Saulo da Fé de Freitas
- Date of birth: 1 August 1967 (age 59)
- Place of birth: São Domingos do Prata, Brazil
- Height: 1.79 m (5 ft 10 in)
- Position: Forward

Senior career*
Years	Team	Apps	(Gls)
1986–1988	Valerio		
1988–1990	Atlético Mineiro	63	(20)
1990	São José-SP		
1991–1996	Paraná	208	(104)
1993	→ Guarani (loan)		
1993	→ Palmeiras (loan)	5	(1)
1994	→ Coritiba (loan)		
1996	Grêmio	14	(3)
1997	Santa Cruz		
1997	Vitória		
1998	XV de Piracicaba		

Managerial career
- 2003–2004: Paraná
- 2006–2007: Rio Branco-PR
- 2007–2008: Paraná
- 2010–2011: Rio Branco-PR
- * Club domestic league appearances and goals as of 21 October 2023

Saulo da Fé de Freitas (born 1 August 1967), simply known as Saulo, is a Brazilian former professional footballer and manager who played as a forward.

== Career ==
He began his career as a professional at Valerio de Itabira. A highlight of the club in the state championship in 1987, at the request of Telê Santana, he was hired by Atlético Mineiro, where he was Minas Gerais state champion in 1989.

Recently created by the merger between Colorado EC and EC Pinheiros, Paraná Clube, structured and with financial support, invested in the player and the return was completely satisfactory. Saulo is considered the greatest player in the history of Paraná Clube, with 208 appearances and 104 goals. He is also was the scorer of the 1992 Série B title goal. When he retired, he would still coach the club, managing to qualify the team for the 2007 Copa Libertadores.

== Honours ==
Atlético Mineiro

- Campeonato Mineiro: 1989

Paraná

- Campeonato Brasileiro Série B: 1992
- Campeonato Paranaense: 1991, 1993, 1994, 1995

Palmeiras

- Campeonato Brasileiro: 1993

Grêmio

- Campeonato Brasileiro: 1996

Individual

- 1992 Campeonato Brasileiro Série B top scorer: 12 goals
- 1992 Campeonato Paranaense top scorer: 13 goals
