= 1981 Campeonato Brasileiro Série A =

Campeonato Brasileiro Série A
- Season: 1981
- Champions: Grêmio (1st title)
- Copa Libertadores de América: Flamengo (title holders); Grêmio; São Paulo
- Matches: 306
- Goals: 754 (2.46 per match)
- Top goalscorer: Nunes (Flamengo) - 16 goals
- Biggest home win: Flamengo 8–0 Fortaleza (February 4, 1981)
- Biggest away win: Desportiva 0–4 Botafogo (January 18, 1981); Mixto 0–4 Atlético Mineiro (February 21, 1981); Itabaiana 1–5 Cruzeiro (February 21, 1981); Paysandu 0–4 Fluminense (March 15, 1981); Fortaleza 0–4 Grêmio (March 28, 1981)
- Highest scoring: Flamengo 8–0 Fortaleza (February 4, 1981)
- Average attendance: 17,545

The 1981 Campeonato Brasileiro Série A (officially the 1981 Taça de Ouro) was the 26th edition of the Campeonato Brasileiro Série A.

== Overview ==
It was performed by 44 teams, and Grêmio won the championship. Teams were selected by record on previous state championship

== Teams and locations ==
Locations of the 1981 Série A teams

State	Team	Qualification method
(São Paulo (state)) São Paulo; 7 berths	São Paulo	1980 Campeonato Paulista champions
(São Paulo (state)) São Paulo; 7 berths	Santos	1980 Campeonato Paulista runners-up
(São Paulo (state)) São Paulo; 7 berths	Ponte Preta	1980 Campeonato Paulista 3rd
(São Paulo (state)) São Paulo; 7 berths	Corinthians	1980 Campeonato Paulista 4th
(São Paulo (state)) São Paulo; 7 berths	Portuguesa	1980 Campeonato Paulista 5th
(São Paulo (state)) São Paulo; 7 berths	Internacional	1980 Campeonato Paulista 6th
(São Paulo (state)) São Paulo; 7 berths	Palmeiras^{1}	Promoted from 1981 Taça de Prata
(Rio de Janeiro (state)) Rio de Janeiro; 5 berths	Fluminense	1980 Campeonato Carioca champions
(Rio de Janeiro (state)) Rio de Janeiro; 5 berths	Vasco da Gama	1980 Campeonato Carioca runners-up
(Rio de Janeiro (state)) Rio de Janeiro; 5 berths	Flamengo	1980 Campeonato Carioca 3rd
(Rio de Janeiro (state)) Rio de Janeiro; 5 berths	Bangu	1980 Campeonato Carioca 4th
(Rio de Janeiro (state)) Rio de Janeiro; 5 berths	Botafogo	1980 Campeonato Carioca 5th
(Rio Grande do Sul) Rio Grande do Sul; 2 berths	Grêmio	1980 Campeonato Gaucho champions
(Rio Grande do Sul) Rio Grande do Sul; 2 berths	Internacional	1980 Campeonato Gaucho runners-up
(Bahia) Bahia; 3 berths	Vitória	1980 Campeonato Baiano champions
(Bahia) Bahia; 3 berths	Galícia	1980 Campeonato Baiano runners-up
(Bahia) Bahia; 3 berths	Bahia^{1}	Promoted from 1981 Taça de Prata
(Ceará) Ceará; 2 berths	Fortaleza	1980 Campeonato Cearense champions
(Ceará) Ceará; 2 berths	Ferroviário-CE	1980 Campeonato Cearense runners-up
(Goiás) Goiás; 2 berths	Vila Nova	1980 Campeonato Goiano champions
(Goiás) Goiás; 2 berths	Goiás	1980 Campeonato Goiano runners-up
(Minas Gerais) Minas Gerais; 3 berths	Atlético Mineiro	1980 Campeonato Mineiro champions
(Minas Gerais) Minas Gerais; 3 berths	Cruzeiro	1980 Campeonato Mineiro runners-up
(Minas Gerais) Minas Gerais; 3 berths	Uberaba^{1}	Promoted from 1981 Taça de Prata
(Paraná (state)) Paraná; 2+1 berths	Londrina	1980 Taça de Prata
(Paraná (state)) Paraná; 2+1 berths	Colorado	1980 Campeonato Paranaense champions
(Paraná (state)) Paraná; 2+1 berths	Pinheiros	
Pernambuco; 3 berths	Santa Cruz	1980 Campeonato Pernambucano champions
Pernambuco; 3 berths	Sport Recife	1980 Campeonato Pernambucano runners-up
Pernambuco; 3 berths	Náutico^{1}	Promoted from 1981 Taça de Prata
Alagoas; 2 berths	CSA	1980 Taça de Prata
Alagoas; 2 berths	CRB	State championship runners-up
(Amazonas (Brazilian state)) Amazonas	Nacional	1980 state champions
(Federal District (Brazil)) Distrito Federal	Brasília	1980 state champions
Espírito Santo	Desportiva	1980 state champions
Maranhão	Sampaio Corrêa	1980 state champions
Mato Grosso	Mixto	1980 state champions
(Mato Grosso do Sul) Mato Grosso do Sul; 1berth	Operário	1980 state champions
Pará	Paysandu	1980 state champions
Paraíba	Campinense	1980 state champions
Piauí	Ríver	1980 state champions
Rio Grande do Norte	América de Natal	1980 state champions
(Santa Catarina (state)) Santa Catarina	Joinville	1980 state champions
Sergipe	Itabaiana	1980 state champions

^{1} Entered directly on second phase.

== First phase ==
=== Group A ===
Pos	Team	Pld	W	D	L	GF	GA	GD	Pts
1	(Rio de Janeiro (state)) Vasco da Gama (A)	9	6	1	2	24	9	+15	13
2	(São Paulo (state)) Ponte Preta (A)	9	5	2	2	16	12	+4	12
3	(Paraná (state)) Colorado (A)	9	4	4	1	8	4	+4	12
4	(Rio de Janeiro (state)) Bangu (A)	9	4	3	2	18	9	+9	11
5	(Rio Grande do Sul) Internacional (A)	9	3	4	2	8	8	0	10
6	(São Paulo (state)) Internacional de Limeira (A)	9	3	3	3	7	11	−4	9
7	(Bahia) Vitória (A)	9	3	2	4	10	12	−2	8
8	(Santa Catarina (state)) Joinville	9	2	2	5	5	11	−6	6
9	(Goiás) Vila Nova	9	2	1	6	8	16	−8	5
10	(Paraná (state)) Londrina	9	2	0	7	5	17	−12	4

(A) Advanced to second phase

=== Group B ===
Pos	Team	Pld	W	D	L	GF	GA	GD	Pts
1	(São Paulo (state)) Portuguesa (A)	9	6	2	1	13	7	+6	14
2	(Mato Grosso do Sul) Operário-MS (A)	9	5	1	3	11	8	+3	11
3	Goiás (A)	9	4	3	2	10	6	+4	11
4	(Rio Grande do Sul) Grêmio (A)	9	4	2	3	11	9	+2	10
5	(São Paulo (state)) Corinthians (A)	9	4	2	3	10	8	+2	10
6	(Bahia) Galícia (A)	9	4	1	4	10	10	0	9
7	(Rio de Janeiro (state)) Botafogo (A)	9	4	1	4	15	12	+3	9
8	(Paraná (state)) Pinheiros	9	1	6	2	9	11	−2	8
9	(Federal District (Brazil)) Brasília	9	2	2	5	10	15	−5	6
10	(Espírito Santo) Desportiva	9	0	2	7	4	17	−13	2

(A) Advanced to second phase

=== Group C ===
Pos	Team	Pld	W	D	L	GF	GA	GD	Pts
1	(São Paulo (state)) São Paulo (A)	9	4	5	0	13	5	+8	13
2	(Pernambuco) Sport (A)	9	4	4	1	10	8	+2	12
3	(Ceará) Ferroviário-CE (A)	9	4	3	2	14	11	+3	11
4	(Rio de Janeiro (state)) Fluminense (A)	9	4	1	4	16	15	+1	9
5	(Minas Gerais) Atlético Mineiro (A)	9	3	3	3	13	8	+5	9
6	(Mato Grosso) Mixto (A)	9	3	2	4	11	15	−4	8
7	(Alagoas) CSA (A)	9	3	2	4	9	15	−6	8
8	(Rio Grande do Norte) América-RN	9	3	2	4	16	17	−1	8
9	(Paraíba) Campinense	9	2	2	5	10	11	−1	6
10	(Piauí) River	9	2	2	5	7	14	−7	6

(A) Advanced to second phase

=== Group D ===
Pos	Team	Pld	W	D	L	GF	GA	GD	Pts
1	(São Paulo (state)) Santos (A)	9	6	3	0	19	4	+15	15
2	(Rio de Janeiro (state)) Flamengo (A)	9	5	3	1	18	7	+11	13
3	(Pernambuco) Santa Cruz (A)	9	4	4	1	16	9	+7	12
4	(Amazonas (Brazilian state)) Nacional-AM (A)	9	4	3	2	7	6	+1	11
5	(Minas Gerais) Cruzeiro (A)	9	4	3	2	11	7	+4	11
6	(Pará) Paysandu (A)	9	3	2	4	12	12	0	8
7	(Ceará) Fortaleza (A)	9	2	3	4	9	16	−7	7
8	(Alagoas) CRB	9	2	2	5	11	16	−5	6
9	(Maranhão) Sampaio Corrêa	9	1	3	5	4	15	−11	5
10	(Sergipe) Itabaiana	9	1	0	8	4	19	−15	2

Source: FutebolNacional.com
(A) Advanced to second phase

== Second phase ==
=== Group E ===
Pos	Team	Pld	W	D	L	GF	GA	GD	Pts
1	(Rio de Janeiro (state)) Vasco da Gama (A)	6	4	2	0	13	5	+8	10
2	(Alagoas) CSA (A)	6	3	2	1	13	5	+8	8
3	(Amazonas (Brazilian state)) Nacional-AM	6	2	0	4	7	11	−4	4
4	(Bahia) Galícia	6	1	0	5	5	17	−12	2

(A) Advanced to round of 16

=== Group F ===
Pos	Team	Pld	W	D	L	GF	GA	GD	Pts
1	(São Paulo (state)) Ponte Preta (A)	6	3	3	0	10	6	+4	9
2	Bahia (A)	6	3	1	2	10	6	+4	7
3	(Pernambuco) Santa Cruz	6	3	1	2	12	10	+2	7
4	(São Paulo (state)) Corinthians	6	0	1	5	4	14	−10	1

(A) Advanced to round of 16

=== Group G ===
Pos	Team	Pld	W	D	L	GF	GA	GD	Pts
1	(Bahia) Vitória (A)	6	3	2	1	6	4	+2	8
2	(Rio de Janeiro (state)) Fluminense (A)	6	2	3	1	12	6	+6	7
3	(São Paulo (state)) Portuguesa	6	1	4	1	6	6	0	6
4	(Pará) Paysandu	6	0	3	3	3	11	−8	3

(A) Advanced to round of 16

=== Group H ===
Pos	Team	Pld	W	D	L	GF	GA	GD	Pts
1	(Mato Grosso do Sul) Operário-MS (A)	6	5	0	1	16	5	+11	10
2	(Pernambuco) Náutico (A)	6	4	0	2	11	5	+6	8
3	(Minas Gerais) Cruzeiro	6	3	0	3	9	13	−4	6
4	(Ceará) Ferroviário-CE	6	0	0	6	3	16	−13	0

(A) Advanced to round of 16

=== Group I ===
Pos	Team	Pld	W	D	L	GF	GA	GD	Pts
1	(São Paulo (state)) São Paulo (A)	6	4	1	1	8	3	+5	9
2	(Rio Grande do Sul) Grêmio (A)	6	4	0	2	9	6	+3	8
3	(São Paulo (state)) Internacional de Limeira	6	2	2	2	12	7	+5	6
4	(Ceará) Fortaleza	6	0	1	5	2	15	−13	1

(A) Advanced to round of 16

=== Group J ===
Pos	Team	Pld	W	D	L	GF	GA	GD	Pts
1	(Rio Grande do Sul) Internacional (A)	6	3	3	0	10	2	+8	9
2	(Pernambuco) Sport (A)	6	2	3	1	9	4	+5	7
3	(São Paulo (state)) Palmeiras	6	3	0	3	7	11	−4	6
4	Goiás	6	0	2	4	1	10	−9	2

(A) Advanced to round of 16

=== Group K ===
Pos	Team	Pld	W	D	L	GF	GA	GD	Pts
1	(Rio de Janeiro (state)) Botafogo (A)	6	3	3	0	10	4	+6	9
2	(São Paulo (state)) Santos (A)	6	2	3	1	7	4	+3	7
3	(Rio de Janeiro (state)) Bangu	6	2	1	3	6	10	−4	5
4	(Mato Grosso) Mixto	6	0	3	3	4	9	−5	3

(A) Advanced to round of 16

=== Group L ===
Pos	Team	Pld	W	D	L	GF	GA	GD	Pts
1	(Rio de Janeiro (state)) Flamengo (A)	6	3	2	1	9	9	0	8
2	(Minas Gerais) Atlético Mineiro (A)	6	2	3	1	8	5	+3	7
3	(Paraná (state)) Colorado	6	1	3	2	8	7	+1	5
4	(Minas Gerais) Uberaba	6	0	4	2	5	9	−4	4

Source: FutebolNacional.com
(A) Advanced to round of 16

== Round of 16 ==
Team 1	Agg.	Team 2	1st leg	2nd leg
Fluminense	3–4	Vasco da Gama	0–2	3–2
Náutico	1-2	Ponte Preta	0–0	1-2
Vitória	2–3	Grêmio	2–1	0–2
Sport	1-3	Operário-MS	0-0	1-3
Bahia	0-2	Flamengo	0-0	0-2
CSA	0-2	Botafogo	0–0	0-2
Atlético Mineiro	1-2	Internacional	0-1	1-1
Santos	1-4	São Paulo	0–2	1-2

== Quarterfinals ==
Team 1	Agg.	Team 2	1st leg	2nd leg
Vasco da Gama	0–0	Ponte Preta (Note: Ponte Preta qualified due to scoring more points in the Round of 16.)	0–0	0–0
Grêmio	3–0	Operário-MS	2–0	1–0
Flamengo	1–3	Botafogo	0–0	1–3
Internacional	0–3	São Paulo	0–1	0–2

== Semi-finals ==
Team 1	Agg.	Team 2	1st leg	2nd leg
Ponte Preta	3–3	Grêmio (Note: Grêmio qualified due to scoring more points in the quarterfinals)	2–3	1–0
Botafogo	3–3	São Paulo (Note: São Paulo qualified due to scoring more points in the quarterfinals)	1–0	2–3

== Finals ==
=== First leg ===
30 April 1981

Grêmio (Rio Grande do Sul)	2–1	(São Paulo (state)) São Paulo
Paulo Isidoro 55', 69'		Serginho Chulapa 39'

Olímpico, Porto Alegre (RS)
Attendance: 53,388
Referee: (Rio de Janeiro (state)) Arnaldo Cézar Coelho

=== Second leg ===
3 May 1981

São Paulo (São Paulo (state))	0–1	(Rio Grande do Sul) Grêmio
		Baltazar 65'

Morumbi, São Paulo (SP)
Attendance: 95,106
Referee: (Rio de Janeiro (state)) José Roberto Wright

== Final standings ==
Pos	Team	Pld	W	D	L	GF	GA	GD	Pts
1	Grêmio	23	14	2	7	32	21	+11	30
2	São Paulo	23	13	6	4	32	15	+17	32
3	Ponte Preta	21	10	8	3	31	22	+9	28
4	Botafogo	21	10	6	5	33	20	+13	26
5	Vasco da Gama	19	11	5	3	41	17	+24	27
6	Flamengo	19	9	7	3	30	19	+11	25
7	Operário-MS	19	11	2	6	30	17	+13	24
8	Internacional	19	7	8	4	20	14	+6	22
9	Santos	17	8	6	3	27	12	+15	22
10	Sport	17	6	8	3	20	15	+5	20
11	Fluminense	17	7	4	6	31	25	+6	18
12	Vitória	17	7	4	6	18	19	−1	18
13	CSA	17	6	5	6	22	22	0	17
14	Atlético Mineiro	17	5	7	5	22	15	+7	17
15	Náutico	8	4	1	3	12	7	+5	9
16	Bahia	8	3	2	3	10	8	+2	8
17	Portuguesa	15	7	6	2	19	13	+6	20
18	Santa Cruz	15	7	5	3	28	19	+9	19
19	Cruzeiro	15	7	3	5	20	20	0	17
20	Colorado	15	5	7	3	16	11	+5	17
21	Bangu	15	6	4	5	24	19	+5	16
22	Nacional	15	6	3	6	14	17	−3	15
23	Internacional-SP	15	5	5	5	19	18	+1	15
24	Goiás	15	4	5	6	11	16	−5	13
25	Galícia	15	5	1	9	15	27	−12	11
26	Corinthians	15	4	3	8	14	22	−8	11
27	Ferroviário-CE	15	4	3	8	17	27	−10	11
28	Paysandu	15	3	5	7	15	23	−8	11
29	Mixto	15	3	5	7	15	24	−9	11
30	Fortaleza	15	2	4	9	11	31	−20	8
31	Palmeiras	6	3	0	3	7	11	−4	6
32	Uberaba	6	0	4	2	5	9	−4	4
33	América-RN	9	3	2	4	16	17	−1	8
34	Pinheiros	9	1	6	2	9	11	−2	8
35	Campinense	9	2	2	5	10	11	−1	6
36	CRB	9	2	2	5	11	16	−5	6
37	Brasília	9	2	2	5	10	15	−5	6
38	Joinville	9	2	2	5	5	11	−6	6
39	River	9	2	2	5	7	14	−7	6
40	Vila Nova-GO	9	2	1	6	8	16	−8	5
41	Sampaio Corrêa	9	1	3	5	4	15	−11	5
42	Londrina	9	2	0	7	5	17	−12	4
43	Itabaiana	9	1	0	8	4	19	−15	2
44	Desportiva Capixaba	9	0	2	7	4	17	−13	2

Source: rsssf.com

== Sources ==
- 1981 Campeonato Brasileiro Série A at RSSSF
- RSSSF Brasil
