= Estádio Vila Olímpica =

Football stadium in Paraná, Brazil

- Interactive map of Estádio Vila Olímpica
- Full name: Estádio Érton Coelho de Queiróz
- Location: Curitiba, Paraná, Brazil
- Coordinates: 25°31′17.98″S 49°13′51.73″W
- Operator: Paraná Clube
- Capacity: 8,000
- Surface: Grass
- Record attendance: 17,926

Construction
- Opened: September 7, 1983

Tenant
- Paraná Clube

Estádio Érton Coelho de Queiróz, also known as Estádio Vila Olímpica (Portuguese for Olympic Village), is one of the football stadiums owned by Paraná Clube in Curitiba, Paraná, Brazil, the other being Estádio Vila Capanema. The stadium holds 8,000 people. Its formal name honors Érton Coelho de Queiróz, who was Pinheiros' president from 1982 to 1985, and helped the stadium construction.

== History ==
In 1983, the works on Estádio Vila Olímpica were completed. The stadium was originally named Estádio Orestes Thá, after a Pinheiros' former president. The inaugural match was played on September 7 of that year when Pinheiros beat Coriitba 1–0. The first goal of the stadium was scored by Pinheiros' Toninho Vieira.

On April 5, 1986, the stadium was renamed to Estádio Érton Coelho de Queiróz, who died in that year.

The stadium's attendance record currently stands at 17,926 people, set on July 8, 1997, when Paraná Clube beat União Bandeirante 3–0.
