= 1992 Campeonato Brasileiro Série B =

Campeonato Brasileiro Série B
- Season: 1992
- Champions: Paraná
- Promoted: Paraná; Vitória; Criciúma; Santa Cruz; Remo; América-MG; Fortaleza; União São João; Grêmio; Ceará; Desportiva Ferroviária; Coritiba
- Goals scored: 583
- Average goals/game: 2,10
- Top goalscorer: Saulo (Paraná) - 12 goals
- Biggest home win: Grêmio 7-1 Operário-MT (8 April 1992)
- Biggest away win: Operário-MT 1-5 São José (March 18, 1992)

The football (soccer) Campeonato Brasileiro Série B 1992, the second level of Brazilian National League, was played from February 9 to July 11, 1992. The competition had 32 clubs and twelve of them were promoted to Série A. The competition was won by Paraná.

== First phase ==
=== Group 1 ===
Pos	Team	Pld	W	D	L	GF	GA	GD	Pts	Promotion
1	(Pernambuco) Santa Cruz	14	6	7	1	18	6	+12	19	Promoted to Série A and Qualified to Second phase.
2	Ceará	14	5	7	2	11	10	+1	17	Promoted to Série A and Qualified to Second phase.
3	(Ceará) Fortaleza	14	6	4	4	15	11	+4	16	Promoted to Série A and Qualified to Second phase.
4	(Paraíba) Campinense	14	5	5	4	12	14	−2	15	
5	(Piauí) Picos	14	3	8	3	10	14	−4	14	
6	(Alagoas) CSA	14	6	1	7	16	14	+2	13	
7	(Rio Grande do Norte) ABC	14	3	4	7	10	16	−6	10	
8	(Pernambuco) Central	14	3	2	9	12	19	−7	8	

=== Group 2 ===
Pos	Team	Pld	W	D	L	GF	GA	GD	Pts	Promotion
1	(Pará) Remo	14	9	1	4	30	12	+18	19	Promoted to Série A and Qualified to Second phase.
2	(Bahia) Vitória	14	6	5	3	18	9	+9	17	Promoted to Série A and Qualified to Second phase.
3	(Espírito Santo) Desportiva Ferroviária	14	7	3	4	16	16	0	16 (Note: 1 point deducted?)	Promoted to Série A and Qualified to Second phase.
4	(Goiás) Anapolina	14	6	3	5	15	16	−1	15	
5	(Sergipe) Confiança	14	5	3	6	12	17	−5	13	
6	(Rio de Janeiro (state)) Itaperuna	14	4	5	5	18	23	−5	13	
7	(Rio de Janeiro (state)) Americano	14	4	4	6	15	17	−2	12	
8	(Federal District (Brazil)) Taguatinga	14	1	4	9	14	28	−14	6	

=== Group 3 ===
Pos	Team	Pld	W	D	L	GF	GA	GD	Pts	Promotion
1	(Santa Catarina (state)) Criciúma	14	7	2	5	15	9	+6	16	Promoted to Série A and Qualified to Second phase.
2	(Paraná (state)) Coritiba	14	6	4	4	11	9	+2	16	Promoted to Série A and Qualified to Second phase.
3	(São Paulo (state)) União São João	14	5	4	5	12	10	+2	14	Promoted to Série A and Qualified to Second phase.
4	(São Paulo (state)) Juventus	14	5	4	5	11	9	+2	14	
5	(São Paulo (state)) Botafogo-SP	14	5	4	5	10	10	0	14	
6	(São Paulo (state)) Noroeste	14	5	3	6	13	20	−7	13	
7	(Rio de Janeiro (state)) Bangu	14	4	5	5	9	9	0	13	
8	(Santa Catarina (state)) Joinville	14	4	4	6	6	11	−5	12	

=== Group 4 ===
Pos	Team	Pld	W	D	L	GF	GA	GD	Pts	Promotion
1	(Minas Gerais) América-MG	14	6	6	2	12	5	+7	18	Promoted to Série A and Qualified to Second phase.
2	(Paraná (state)) Paraná	14	5	8	1	17	10	+7	18	Promoted to Série A and Qualified to Second phase.
3	(Rio Grande do Sul) Grêmio	14	6	5	3	22	13	+9	17	Promoted to Série A and Qualified to Second phase.
4	(São Paulo (state)) São José	14	6	4	4	22	13	+9	16	
5	(São Paulo (state)) Ponte Preta	14	5	6	3	15	13	+2	16	
6	(Paraná (state)) Londrina	14	5	3	6	15	16	−1	13	
7	(Mato Grosso do Sul) Operário-MS	14	2	6	6	13	19	−6	10	
8	(Mato Grosso) Operário-MT	14	1	2	11	11	38	−27	4	

== Second phase ==
Originally, the 2nd phase would be disputed in knockout style. The teams would be matched according to their record in the first phase, so the matches would be:

Team 1	Agg.	Team 2	1st leg	2nd leg
Santa Cruz	–	União São João	–	–
Criciúma	-	Fortaleza	–	–
Ceará	–	Coritiba	–	–
Remo	-	Grêmio	–	–
América-MG	–	Desportiva Ferroviária	–	–
Paraná	-	Vitória	–	–

However, to reduce the costs, the 2nd phase was changed and the teams were assigned in groups according to their geographical position. To compensate, clubs with advantage in original rules (Santa Cruz, Criciúma, Ceará, Remo, América and Paraná) earned an extra point.

=== Group 1 ===
Pos	Team	Pld	W	D	L	GF	GA	GD	BP	Pts	Qualification
1	Remo	6	2	4	0	6	3	+3	1	9	Qualified
2	Santa Cruz	6	1	3	2	5	9	−4	1	6	Qualified
3	Fortaleza	6	2	2	2	7	5	+2	0	6	Qualified
4	Ceará	6	0	5	1	5	6	−1	1	6	

=== Group 2 ===
Pos	Team	Pld	W	D	L	GF	GA	GD	BP	Pts	Qualification
1	Vitória	6	3	3	0	7	3	+4	0	9	Qualified
2	América-MG	6	2	2	2	7	6	+1	1	7	Qualified
3	União São João	6	2	3	1	4	3	+1	0	7	Qualified
4	Desportiva Ferroviária	6	0	2	4	4	10	−6	0	2	

=== Group 3 ===
Pos	Team	Pld	W	D	L	GF	GA	GD	BP	Pts	Qualification
1	Criciúma	6	3	2	1	9	4	+5	1	9	Qualified
2	Paraná	6	3	2	1	7	6	+1	1	9	Qualified
3	Grêmio	6	2	1	3	7	7	0	0	5	
4	Coritiba	6	0	3	3	4	10	−6	0	3	

== Third phase ==
Once more, the rules were changed. For unknown reasons, Fortaleza went to court claiming to have the right to have a berth. Instead of 6 teams qualifying to the 3rd phase, 2 more berths were created. CBF invited Fortaleza and Grêmio, that had the best record among the eliminated. Grêmio forfeited their berth to the 3rd phase alleging financial reasons, União São João won the berth.

=== Group 1 ===
Pos	Team	Pld	W	D	L	GF	GA	GD	Pts	Qualification
1	Vitória	6	4	1	1	7	1	+6	9	Qualified
2	Santa Cruz	6	3	0	3	6	4	+2	6	Qualified
3	Fortaleza	6	3	0	3	8	10	−2	6	
4	Remo	6	1	1	4	4	10	−6	3	

=== Group 2 ===
Pos	Team	Pld	W	D	L	GF	GA	GD	Pts	Qualification
1	Paraná	6	1	5	0	1	0	+1	7	Qualified
2	Criciúma	6	2	3	1	5	3	+2	7	Qualified
3	América-MG	6	1	3	2	3	6	−3	5	
4	União São João	6	1	3	2	5	5	0	5	

== Semifinals ==
Team 1	Agg.	Team 2	1st leg	2nd leg
Santa Cruz	2–4	Paraná	1–2	1–2
Criciúma	3-4	Vitória	2–1	1–3

== Finals ==
=== First leg ===
5 July 1992

Paraná (Paraná (state))	2 – 1	(Bahia) Vitória
Adoílson 16' (p), 43'		Alex Alves 77'

Pinheirão, Curitiba (PR)
Attendance: 18,472

=== Second leg ===
11 July 1992

Vitória (Bahia)	0 – 1	(Paraná (state)) Paraná
		Saulo 54'

Fonte Nova, Salvador (BA)
Attendance: 60,442
Referee: (Minas Gerais) Márcio Rezende de Freitas

== Sources ==
- "Brazil Second Level 1992". rsssfbrasil.com.
