= Estádio da Ressacada =

Football stadium in Florianópolis, Brazil

Estádio Aderbal Ramos da Silva
- "Ressacada"
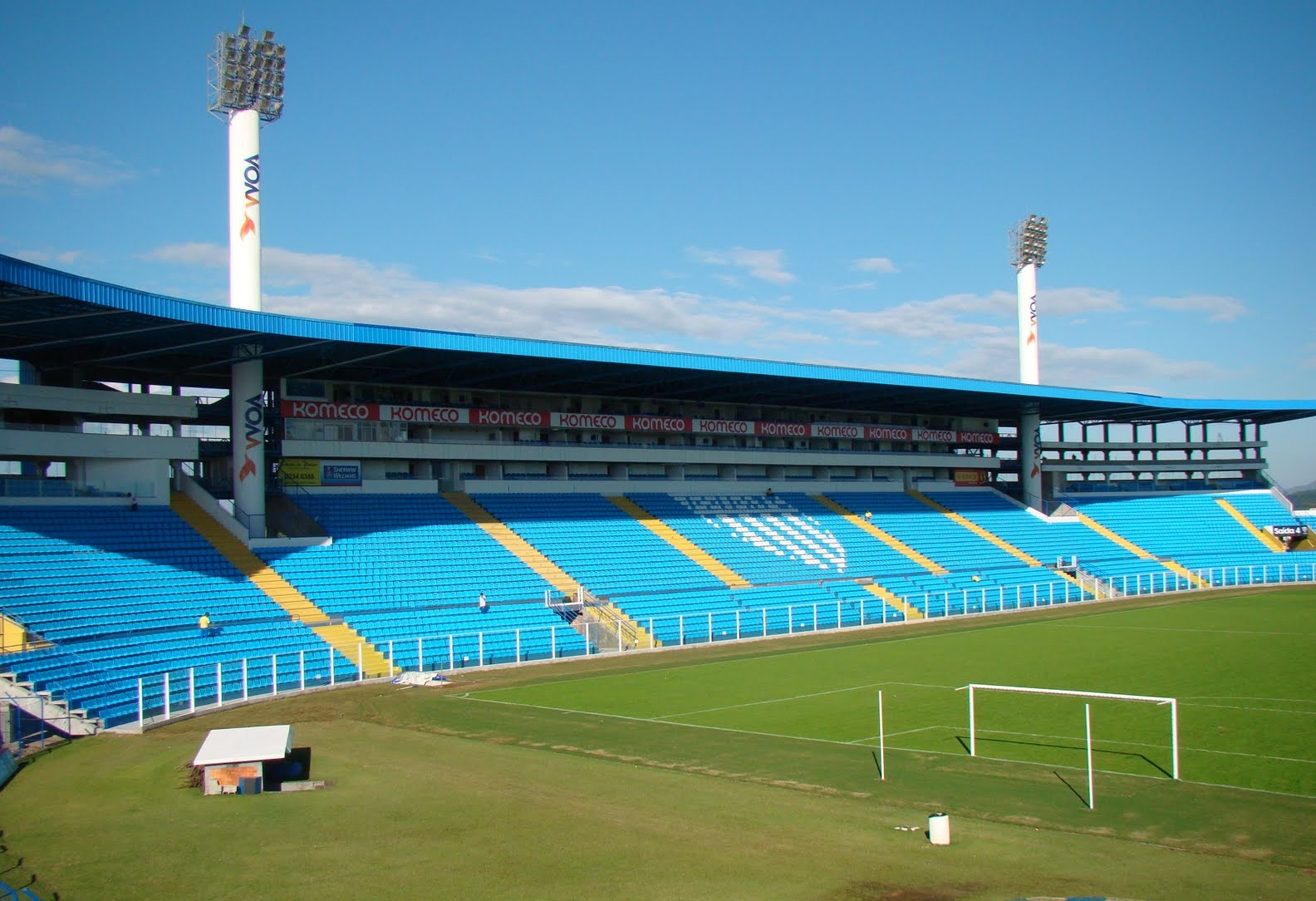
- Sisbrace
- Interactive map of Estádio Aderbal Ramos da Silva
- Full name: Aderbal Ramos da Silva Stadium
- Location: Florianópolis, Brazil
- Coordinates: 27°39′59″S 48°31′54″W
- Owner: Avaí Futebol Clube
- Capacity: 17,800
- Surface: Grass
- Record attendance: 25,735
- Field size: 110 x 75 m

Construction
- Groundbreaking: 1983
- Built: 1983
- Opened: November 15, 1983
- Renovated: 2006
- Architect: Davi Ferreira Lima

Tenant
- Avaí

Estádio Aderbal Ramos da Silva, usually called Estádio da Ressacada or just Ressacada, is a football stadium inaugurated on November 15, 1983 in Carianos neighborhood, Florianópolis, Santa Catarina, with a maximum capacity of approximately 17,800 people. The stadium is owned by Avaí. Its formal name honors Aderbal Ramos da Silva (1911–1985), who was president of the Santa Catarina Football Federation and was also governor of the state.

The first match played at the stadium took place on November 15, 1983, when Avaí FC was defeated 6–1 by CR Vasco da Gama. Several matches of the Brazilian football team, as well as the Brazilian football Olympic team were played at Ressacada stadium.

This stadium should not be confused with Blumenau's former stadium, which was also called Estádio Aderbal Ramos da Silva. However, it was nicknamed DEBA and had a maximum capacity of 4,000 people.

== History ==
In 1982, to replace the old Estádio Adolfo Konder, Avaí bought a ground plot close to the city's airport (Hercílio Luz International Airport). The construction works were led by Cairo Bueno, and the stadium was designed by the architect Davi Ferreira Lima.

The inaugural match was played on November 15, 1983, when Vasco da Gama beat Avaí 6-1. The first goal of the stadium was scored by Vasco da Gama's Vilson Tadei.

On May 31, 1986, the stadium lights were inaugurated.

The stadium's attendance record currently stands at 25,735, set on July 17, 1988, when Avaí beat Blumenau 2-1, for the Campeonato Catarinense final.

== Events ==
On April 25, 2012, the ex-Beatle Paul McCartney played a concert at the stadium in front of 30,000 fans during his On the Run Tour. This was his first concert in the city. Paul McCartney is scheduled to perform another concert at Ressacada on october of 2024, with his Got Back Tour.
