= Esporte Clube Comercial (PR) =

Comercial
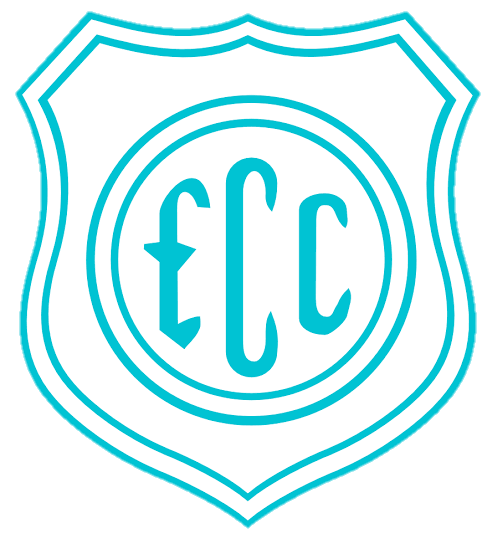
- Full name: Esporte Clube Comercial
- Founded: March 14, 1943
- Ground: Estádio Ubirajara Medeiros, Cornélio Procópio, Paraná state, Brazil
- Capacity: 6,000
Home colours	Away colours

Esporte Clube Comercial, is a football club based in Cornélio Procópio in the south Brazilian state of Paraná.

The club, founded on March 14, 1943, is best known for having the state championship of Paraná of 1961 following two wins in the regional championships of north Paraná in 1958 and 1961.

Comercial play their home games at Estádio Ubirajara Medeiros which has a maximum capacity of 6,000 people.

== Honours ==
- Campeonato Paranaense: 1961
- Championship of North Paraná: 1958, 1961
