= América Football Club (PR) =

América
- Full name: América Foot-Ball Club
- Nickname(s): Rubro-Negro
- Founded: May 24, 1914
- Dissolved: 1924
- Ground: Orestes Thá, Curitiba, Brazil
- Capacity: 5,000
Home colors	Away colors

The América Football Club, was a Brazilian football team from Curitiba, Paraná. América played its home games at Estádio Orestes Thá had a maximum capacity of 5,000 people.

The club was formed founded on 24 May 1914 and in 1915 took part in the championship of the Liga Sportiva Paranaense. In the following year the club was part of a group of clubs that broke away from the LSP to form the Associação Paranaense de Sports Athléticos. In 1917 América merged with the runner-up of the state's first championship in 1915, Paraná Sport Club, founded in 1912 in Ponte Grossa by employees of the American South Brazilian Engineering Company, to form the América Paraná Sport Club with seat in Curitiba.

In the same year this new club won the championship of the new joint league of the Associação Sportiva Paranaense, leaving the title holders Coritiba Foot Ball Club behind on second place. América-Paraná's Gaeta was top scorer with nine goals. In 1918 the club finished on the fifth place amongst six participants and in February 1919, before start of the new championship, the merger was undone.

América and Paraná SC remained unimpressive in the following years, the latter being disbanded during the course of the 1926 championship. After América did not participate in the 1923 championship it merged before the 1924 competition with the Internacional Sport Club, created itself in 1921 through a merger of the states first champions in 1915, the Internacional Futebol Clube and the Centro Hipico Paranaense, to form today's Clube Atlético Paranaense.

== Honours ==
- Torneio Início do Paraná
  - Winners (1): 1918
