= Palestra Itália Futebol Clube =

Palestra Itália
- Full name: Palestra Itália Futebol Clube
- Founded: January 7, 1921
- Dissolved: 1971
- Ground: Tarumã, Curitiba, Brazil
- Capacity: 6,000
Home colours	Away colours

Palestra Itália Futebol Clube, commonly known as Palestra Itália, were a Brazilian football team from Curitiba, Paraná state. They won the Campeonato Paranaense three times.

== History ==
Palestra Itália Futebol Clube were founded on January 7, 1921. During World War II they changed their name to Paranaense, then Comercial and then Palmeiras. After the war, in 1945, the club was renamed again to Palestra Itália. They won the Campeonato Paranaense in 1924, 1926, and in 1932. The club merged with Britânia Sport Club and Clube Atlético Ferroviário in 1971, forming Colorado Esporte Clube.

== Stadium ==
Palestra Itália played their home games at Estádio Tarumã. The stadium had a maximum capacity of 6,000 people.

== Honours ==
=== State ===
- Campeonato Paranaense
  - Winners (3): 1924, 1926, 1932
  - Runners-up (2): 1921, 1952
- Torneio Início do Paraná
  - Winners (3): 1925, 1929, 1931

=== City ===
- Liga Curitibana
  - Winners (1): 1932
