= Estádio Adolfo Konder =

Soccer stadium in Florianópolis, Santa Catarina, Brazil

Coordinates: 27.6664°S 48.5317°W

The Estádio Adolfo Konder (Adolfo Konder Stadium), also known as Campo da Liga, was a soccer stadium located in Florianópolis, Santa Catarina state, Brazil, with a maximum capacity of approximately 14,000 people. The stadium was owned by Avaí Futebol Clube.

== History ==
It was inaugurated in 1930.

On May 13, 1945, Avaí beat Paula Ramos 21–3. It is the largest number of goals scored (by both teams) in a single Brazilian football match.

The stadium's attendance record currently stands at 19,985, set on August 15, 1972, when Santos beat Avaí 2–1.

Estádio Adolfo Konder was demolished in 1982. The stadium was replaced by Estádio da Ressacada.
