= Pinheirão =

Football stadium in Brazil

Coordinates: 25°25′53.5″S 49°13′9.5″W

Centro Poliesportivo Pinheiro
- Pinheirão
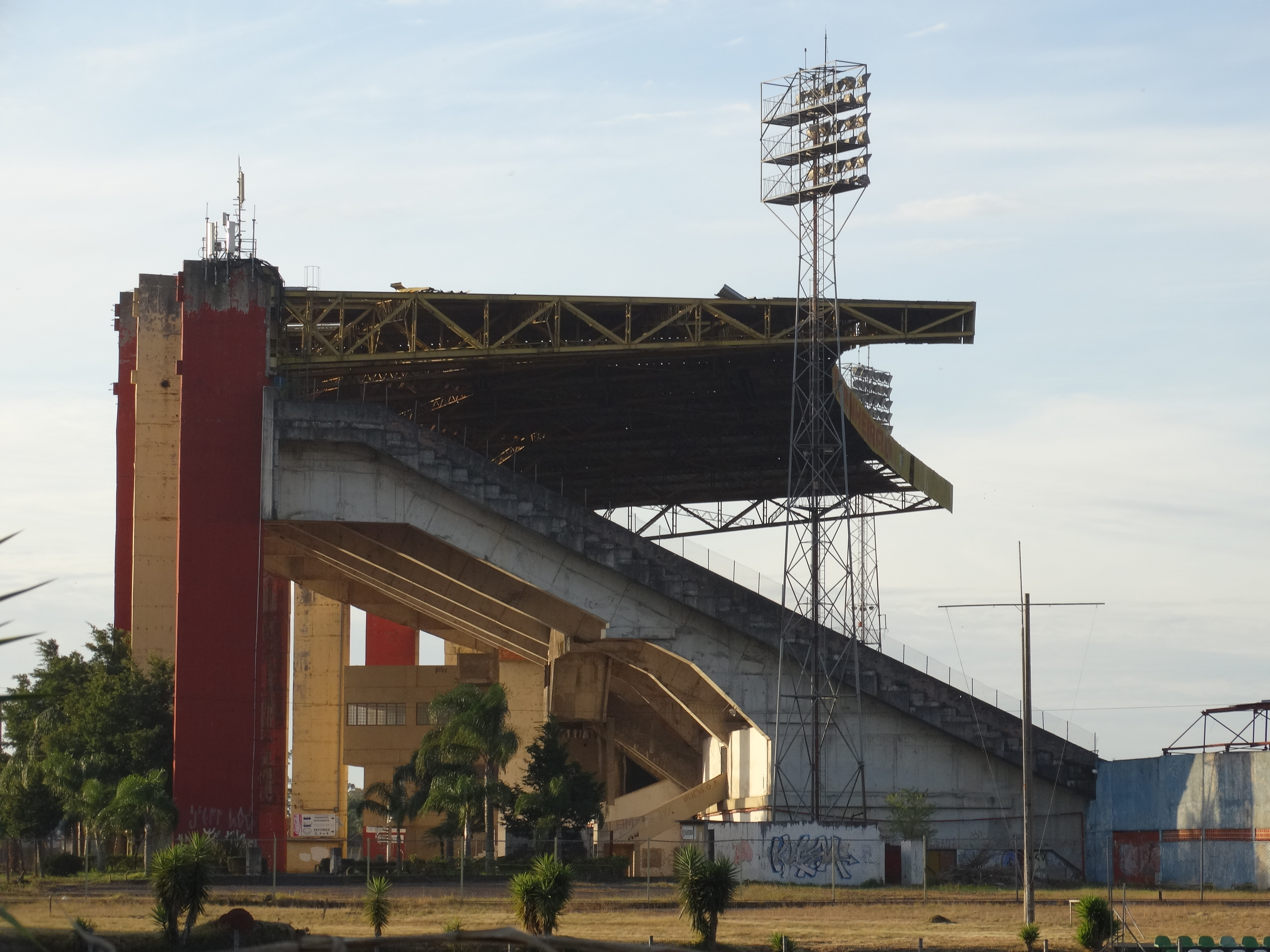
- Interactive map of Centro Poliesportivo Pinheiro
- Location: Curitiba, Paraná, Brazil
- Owner: Paraná Clube
- Capacity: 45,000
- Surface: Grass

Construction
- Opened: June 15, 1985
- Closed: 2006 (abandoned)

Tenants
- Paraná Clube (1989-2006); Coritiba (1985-2006, occasional); Atlético Paranaense (1985-2006, occasional)

The Centro Poliesportivo Pinheiro, also known as the Pinheirão, is a football stadium inaugurated on June 15, 1985 in Curitiba, Paraná, Brazil, with a maximum capacity of 35,000 people. The stadium is owned by the Paranaense Football Federation (meaning Federação Paranaense de Futebol in Portuguese), and was the home ground of Paraná Clube. Its formal name means Pinheiro Multi-Modality Center and honors the Pine tree, which is a common tree in the state.

== History ==
Pinheirão was completed in 1985 and was inaugurated on June 15 of that year.

The stadium was planned to have a maximum capacity of 126,000 people. The works started in the beginning of the 1970s, but in the beginning of the following decade, the works stopped because of lack of funds. After a deal with Paranaense Football Federation, the works resumed, and in 1985 it was inaugurated with a maximum capacity of 45,000 people.

The negotiation of a US$ 750,000 debt between the Paranaense Football Federation and the Government of Paraná State caused a CPI (Comissão Parlamentar de Inquérito, which means Investigation Parliamentary Committee in English) against Onaireves Moura, former president of Paraná Football Federation.

The inaugural match was played on June 15, 1985, when Santa Catarina State XI beat Paraná State XI 3-1. The stadium's first goal was scored by Santa Catarina State XI's Catatau.

The stadium's attendance record currently stands at 44,475, set on June 11, 1998, when Atlético Paranaense beat Coritiba 2-1.

In 2003 the stadium was totally remodelled to receive the game of the Brazil national football team against Uruguay, for the 2006 World Cup Qualifyings.

After the World Cup Qualifications in 2006, the stadium was left abandoned, just 20 years after its opening.
