= Clube Atlético Monte Alegre =

Monte Alegre
- Full name: Clube Atlético Monte Alegre
- Founded: May 1, 1946
- Dissolved: ?
- Ground: Estádio Horácio Klabin, Telêmaco Borba, Paraná state, Brazil
- Capacity: 5,000
| Home colours | Away colours |

Clube Atlético Monte Alegre, commonly known as Monte Alegre, was a Brazilian football club based in Telêmaco Borba, Paraná state. They won the Campeonato Paranaense once.

== History ==
The club was founded on May 1, 1946. Monte Alegre won the Campeonato Paranaense in 1955. The club eventually closed its football department.

== Honours ==
- Campeonato Paranaense:
  - Winners (1): 1955

== Stadium ==
Clube Atlético Monte Alegre played their home games at Estádio Horácio Klabin. The stadium had a maximum capacity of 5,000 people.
