= Internacional Foot-Ball Club =

Internacional
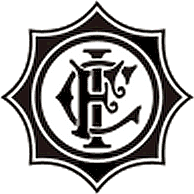
- Full name: Internacional Futebol Clube
- Founded: 22 May 1912
- Dissolved: 26 March 1924
- Ground: Baixada do Água Verde, Curitiba, Brazil
- Capacity: 5,000
Home colors	Away colors

Internacional Foot Ball Club, from 1912 Internacional Sport Club, was a football club from Curitiba, the capital of the Brazilian state of Paraná. Internacional played its home games at the Baixada do Água Verde which had a maximum capacity of 5,000 people.

The club was founded on 22 May 1912 under the leadership of Joaquim Américo Guimarães (who later became a councilor of Curitiba) by members of the Jockey Club Paranaense. In 1914, the team's stadium Baixada do Água Verde was inaugurated with a 1-7 defeat against CR Flamengo from Rio de Janeiro. At that time, the attendance of 3,000 was the state's record for a football match.

In 1915, Internacional won the championship of the Liga Sportiva Paranaense and is now considered the first winner of the state championship of Paraná, the Campeonato Paranaense. Ivo Leão from Internacional scored 14 goals, becoming the first top scorer of the league. In both 1917 and 1918, the club were runners-up in the state championship.

In 1921 Internacional merged with Centro Hipico Paranaense to form a new club: Internacional Sport Club. Internacional Sport Club merged with América Foot-Ball Club before the championship of 1924, forming today's Clube Atlético Paranaense. The location of the Baixada do Água Verde is now the ground of Atlético's modern stadium, Arena da Baixada.

== Honours ==
- Campeonato Paranaense
  - Winners (1): 1915
  - Runners-up (1): 1917
