= Paraná Clube =

Brazilian association football club based in Curitiba

Paraná
- Full name: Paraná Clube
- Nickname: Tricolor da Vila (Tricolor of the Village)
- Founded: 19 December 1989; 36 years ago
- Ground: Estádio Vila Capanema
- Capacity: 17,140
- President: Rubens Ferreira Silva
- Head coach: Marcão
- League: Campeonato Paranaense Série Prata
- 2025: Paranaense, 12th of 12 (relegated)
- Website: paranaclube.com.br
| Home colors | Away colors |

Paraná Clube, commonly referred to as Paraná, is a Brazilian professional club based in Curitiba, Paraná founded on 19 December 1989. It competes in the Campeonato Paranaense Série Prata, the second tier of the Paraná state championship.

Established on 19 December 1989, in the Vila Capanema district, it is one of several Brazilian clubs called Tricolor da Vila ("tricolored of the town") by its fans because it has three team colors. Paraná's three colors are red, white and blue. Apart from football, other sports sponsored at the club are bowling, futsal, martial arts, tennis, volleyball and weight-lifting.

== History ==
On 19 December 1989, Paraná Clube was founded by the merger of EC Pinheiros (three times winner of the state championship (1967 as Savóia FC Água Verde, 1984, 1987)), and Colorado EC (winner of one state championship (1980)). Rubens Minelli was hired as the club's first manager, and Emerson de Andrade was chosen as the director of football.

The club's first match was played on 4 February 1990, when Coritiba beat Paraná 1–0 at the Estádio Couto Pereira.

In 1991, two years after the club's foundation, Paraná won its first state championship. Later, Paraná would win five state championships in a row, from 1993 to 1997.

In 1992, the club won the Campeonato Brasileiro Série B, gaining the right to compete in the following year's Série A. After 8 years, Paraná Clube won another national championship. In 2000, Paraná beat AD São Caetano to win the Yellow Module of the João Havelange Cup. This cup replaced the Campeonato Brasileiro (all levels), which had been suspended for one year.

On 9 April 2006, Paraná Clube won the Paraná State League for the 7th time after beating ADAP of Campo Mourão 3–0 in the Maringá and drawing 1–1 at Pinheirão Stadium. The attendance of the final match was 25,306 supporters. 2006 was one of the club's best ever years, finishing fifth in the 2006 Série A and gaining a berth for the 2007 Libertadores. Highlights of the campaign were victories over Gremio (5-2), Flamengo (4-1), and Ponte Preta (5-2).

Estadio Vila Capanema was renovated in 2006. The capacity rose to 20,083 spectators, and the inaugural match was held on 20 September 2006 when Paraná beat Fortaleza 2–0 in the Campeonato Brasileiro.

In 2007, Paraná played its first Copa Libertadores match. In the first stage, Paraná eliminated Cobreloa from Chile, winning the first leg 2–0 in Calama and drawing 1–1 in Curitiba. In the group stage, composed by Parana Clube, Flamengo, Union Maracaibo and Real Potosi, the club finished in second place. Paraná was eliminated in the Round of 16 by Libertad, of Paraguay. In the 2007 Serie A, the club spent most of the season in mid table, but after a heavy 6-0 loss to Sao Paulo the club went into free-fall, losing ten of their last fifteen matches.

After 10 years in the second division, Paraná gained access to the first division of the Brazilian Championship, defeating CRB 1-0 for the 37th round of Serie B 2017. In the 2018 Serie A, the club had an even worse campaign from 2007, registering only 4 wins all season and finishing in last place with 23 points.

Since then the club has been in a free-fall, suffering a double relegation; in 2020 Parana was relegated after an poor campaign in the Serie B, and the following season the club was relegated from the Serie C. In 2022, the club was relegated from the state league's top division.

== Stadiums ==
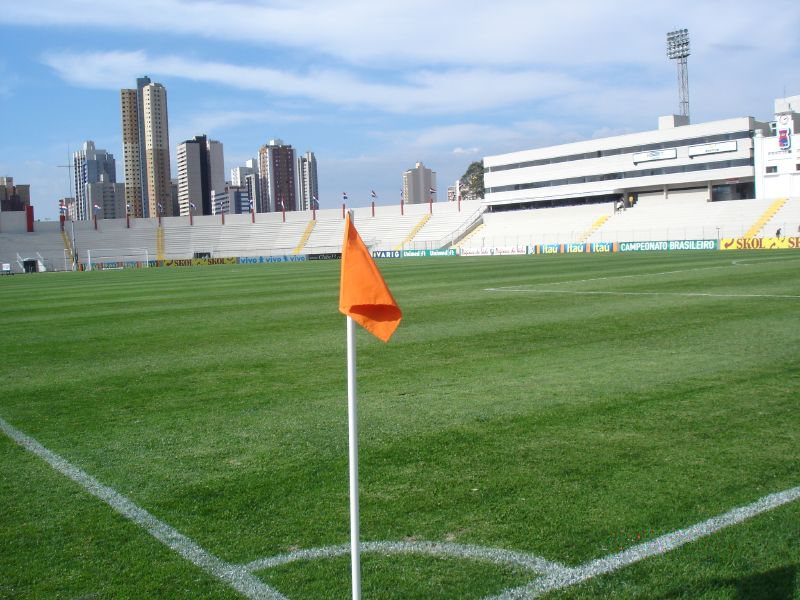
Vila Capanema Stadium

Vila Capanema Stadium

Paraná Clube's official stadium is Estádio Durival Britto e Silva, also known as Vila Capanema. They occasionally used to play at the Pinheirão. Vila Olímpica also belongs to Paraná Clube but it is only used for training:

- Estádio Durival Britto e Silva (Vila Capanema): capacity 20,000 spectators.
- Estádio Erton Coelho de Queiroz (Vila Olímpica): capacity 18,500 spectators.

== Symbols ==
=== Crest ===
The club's logo has a stylized conifer cone format, in red, with a white contour, which contains an azure jay and a white pine. The club's name is written in blue, as is the word Brasil. The word Clube is written in white.

=== Flag ===
Paraná's flag is rectangular, divided in two equal parts vertically. The right side is red and the left side is blue.

=== Mascot ===
The mascot of Paraná Clube is an azure jay, a common bird in Paraná state. The bird is also the symbol of Paraná state.

=== Anthem ===
The Paraná Clube anthem was written by João Arnaldo and Sebastião Lima.

=== Colors ===
Paraná Clube's colors are red, blue and white. The red color was Colorado's main color, the blue color was Pinheiros' main color, and white was a color adopted by both teams.

== Rivals ==
Their biggest rivals are from the same city: Atlético-PR and Coritiba.

== Honours ==
=== Official tournaments ===
National
| Competitions | Titles | Seasons |
|---|---|---|
| Campeonato Brasileiro Série B | 2 | 1992, 2000 |
State
| Competitions | Titles | Seasons |
| Campeonato Paranaense | 7 | 1991, 1993, 1994, 1995, 1996, 1997, 2006 |
| Campeonato Paranaense Série Prata | 2 | 2012, 2024 |

=== Others tournaments ===
==== National unofficial ====
- Copa João Havelange – Módulo Amarelo (1): 2000^{(1)}

==== Inter-state ====
- Seletiva Qualificatória Campeonato Brasileiro Série C (1): 1990
- Torneio Verão de Paranaguá (1): 1996
- Copa Vila Velha (1): 2004
- Torneio Quadrangular de Tangará da Serra-MT (1): 2004

=== Runners-up ===
- Copa Sul (1): 1999
- Campeonato Paranaense (4): 1999, 2001, 2002, 2007
- Copa Paraná (1): 2026

Notes

^{1}In 2000, Paraná Clube won the Yellow Module of the Copa João Havelange, equivalent to what would be Série B in that year. However, this title is not recognized by the CBF.

== South American record ==
As of match played 27 June 2023

| Competition | Played | Won | Drew | Lost | GF | GA | GD | Win% |
|---|---|---|---|---|---|---|---|---|
| Copa Libertadores | 10 | 4 | 2 | 4 | 14 | 12 | +2 | 40.00 |
| Copa Sudamericana | 4 | 1 | 0 | 3 | 3 | 8 | −5 | 25.00 |
| Copa CONMEBOL | 4 | 2 | 0 | 2 | 3 | 3 | +0 | 50.00 |
| Total | 18 | 7 | 2 | 9 | 20 | 23 | −3 | 38.89 |

| Season | Competition | Round | Opponents | Home | Away | Aggregate |
|---|---|---|---|---|---|---|
| 1999 | Copa CONMEBOL | 1R | (Paraguay) San Lorenzo | 1-0 | 1-2 | 2-2 (3-1p) |
| 1999 | Copa CONMEBOL | QF | (Argentina) Talleres | 1-0 | 0-1 | 1-1 (1-3p) |
| 2004 | Copa Sudamericana | 1R | (Brazil) Santos | 2-1 | 0-3 | 2-4 |
| 2006 | Copa Sudamericana | 2R | (Brazil) Athletico Paranaense | 1-3 | 0-1 | 1-4 |
| 2007 | Copa Libertadores | | | | | |
| 2007 | Copa Libertadores | 1R | (Chile) Cobreloa | 1–1 | 2-0 | 3-1 |
| 2007 | Copa Libertadores | Group 5 | (Brazil) Flamengo | 0-1 | 0-1 | 2nd |
| 2007 | Copa Libertadores | Group 5 | (Bolivia) Real Potosí | 2-0 | 1-3 | 2nd |
| 2007 | Copa Libertadores | Group 5 | (Venezuela) Unión Maracaibo | 2-1 | 4-2 | 2nd |
| 2007 | Copa Libertadores | R16 | (Paraguay) Libertad | 1-2 | 1-1 | 2–3 |

== Managers ==
- (Brazil) Sebastião Lazaroni (1989)
- (Brazil) Rubens Minelli (1990)
- (Brazil) Otacílio Gonçalves (1991–92)
- (Brazil) Levir Culpi (1993)
- (Brazil) Rubens Minelli (1994–97)
- (Brazil) Vanderlei Luxemburgo (1995)
- (Brazil) Otacílio Gonçalves (1995–96)
- (Brazil) Sebastião Lazaroni (1996)
- (Brazil) Antônio Lopes (1996)
- (Brazil) Mário Juliato (1996)
- (Brazil) Cláudio Duarte (1997–98)
- (Brazil) Otacílio Gonçalves (1998–99)
- (Brazil) Abel Braga (1999–00)
- (Brazil) Geninho (2000)
- (Brazil) Caio Júnior (2002)
- (Brazil) Otacílio Gonçalves (2002–03)
- (Brazil) Cuca (2003)
- (Brazil) Adílson Batista (2003)
- (Brazil) Gilson Kleina (2004), (2006)
- (Brazil) Paulo Campos (2004–05)
- (Brazil) Lori Sandri (2005)
- (Brazil) Caio Júnior (2006)
- (Brazil) Zetti (2006–07)
- (Brazil) Pintado (2007)
- (Brazil) Gilson Kleina (2007)
- (Brazil) Lori Sandri (2007)
- (Brazil) Saulo de Freitas (2007–08)
- (Brazil) Paulo Bonamigo (2008)
- (Brazil) Rogério Perrô (2008)
- (Brazil) Paulo Comelli (2008–09)
- (Brazil) Velloso (2009)
- (Brazil) Zetti (2009)
- (Brazil) Sérgio Soares (2009)
- (Brazil) Roberto Cavalo (2009)
- (Brazil) Marcelo Oliveira (2010)
- (Brazil) Roberto Cavalo (2010–11)
- (Brazil) Ricardo Pinto (2011)
- (Brazil) Guilherme Macuglia (2011)
- (Brazil) Ricardinho (2012)
- (Brazil) Toninho Cecílio (2012–13)
- (Brazil) Dado Cavalcanti (2013)
- (Brazil) Milton Mendes (2014)
- (Brazil) Ricardo Drubscky (2014)
- (Brazil) Claudinei Oliveira (2014)
- (Brazil) Ricardinho (2014)
- (Brazil) Nedo Xavier (2015)
- (Brazil) Fernando Diniz (2015)
- (Brazil) Claudinei Oliveira (2016)
- (Brazil) Marcelo Martelotte (2016)
- (Brazil) Roberto Fernandes (2016)
- (Japan) Wagner Lopes (2017)
- (Brazil) Lisca (2017)
- (Brazil) Matheus Costa (2017)
- (Japan) Wagner Lopes (2018)
- (Brazil) Rogério Micale (2018)
- (Brazil) Claudinei Oliveira (2018)
- (Brazil) Dado Cavalcanti (2018–19)
- (Brazil) Allan Aal (2020)
- (Brazil) Rogério Micale (2020)
- (Brazil) Gilmar Dal Pozzo (2020–21)
- (Brazil) Márcio Coelho (2021)
- (Brazil) Sílvio Criciúma (2019)
- (Brazil) Jorge Ferreira (2021–22)
- (Brazil) Rodrigo Cascca (2022)
- (Brazil) Omar Feitosa (2022)
- (Brazil) Marcão Skavisnki (2023)
- (Brazil) Fahel Júnior (2023)
- (Brazil) Tcheco (2024)
- (Brazil) Argel Fuchs (2025)
