= Esporte Clube Pinheiros (PR) =

Pinheiros
- Full name: Esporte Clube Pinheiros
- Nicknames: Alviceleste; Leão da Vila Guaíra
- Founded: July 14, 1914; 111 years ago
- Dissolved: 19 December 1989; 36 years ago (merged with Colorado Esporte Clube to form Paraná Clube)
- Ground: Vila Olímpica
- Capacity: 18,500
- League: Campeonato Paranaense
Home colours	Away colours

Esporte Clube Pinheiros, commonly known as Pinheiros, was a Brazilian football club from Curitiba. The club won three times the state championship, the Campeonato Paranaense, and competed twice in the national championship.

== History ==
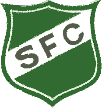
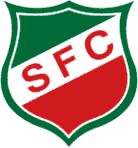

Logos of Savóia Futebol Clube

EC Água Verde

Esporte Club Água Verde

Savóia Futebol Clube were founded in 1914, while Esporte Club Água Verde were founded in 1915. Savóia and Água Verde merged in 1920 to form Savóia-Água Verde. Savóia-Água Verde were renamed to Savóia Futebol Clube in 1921, and then renamed to Esporte Clube Brasil in 1942, and after the World War II, the club were renamed to Esporte Clube Água Verde.

To distinguish itself from its local rivals, the Coritiba, the club changed its colors in 1960 to blue and white. In 1971 followed the renaming of the club to Esporte Clube Pinheiros, after the Pinheiro-do-Paraná, an araucaria, the symbol tree of the state of Paraná.

Pinheiros won the state championship, the Campeonato Paranaense in 1967 as Água Verde, and in 1984 and in 1987 as Pinheiros. The club participated in the national Brazilian Championship, the Série A in 1981 and in 1985, finishing statistically as 34th, respectively as 21st of 44 teams. In its last year of existence Pinheiros also qualified for the main competition of the Brazilian cup, the Copa do Brasil, where the team lost in July 1989 in the first round – 32 clubs – with 0–1 and 1–2 to Mixto EC from Cuiabá in Mato Grosso.

On December 19, 1989, Pinheiros joined forces with local rivals Colorado Esporte Clube to form Paraná Clube.

== Honours ==
=== State ===
- Campeonato Paranaense
  - Winners (2): 1984, 1987
  - Runners-up (3): 1985, 1986, 1988

=== City ===
- Taça José Milani
  - Winners (1): 1973
- Taça Cidade de Curitiba / Troféu Clemente Comandulli
  - Winners (1): 1977
