= Campeonato Paranaense =

Football league in Paraná, Brazil

- Organising body: FPF
- Founded: 1915; 111 years ago
- Country: Brazil
- State: (Paraná (state)) Paraná
- Level on pyramid: 1
- Relegation to: Campeonato Paranaense Série Prata
- Current champions: Operário Ferroviário (3rd title) (2026)
- Most championships: Coritiba (39 titles)
- Broadcaster(s): DAZN
- Website: FPF Official website
- Current: 2026 Campeonato Paranaense

The Campeonato Paranaense is the top-flight professional state football league in the Brazilian state of Paraná. It is run by the Paraná Football Federation (FPF).

== List of champions ==
Season	Champions	Runners-up
1915	Internacional (1)	Paraná SC
1916	Coritiba (1)	Britânia
1917	América (1)	Internacional
1918	Britânia (1)	Coritiba
1919	Britânia (2)	Coritiba
1920	Britânia (3)	Coritiba
1921	Britânia (4)	Palestra Itália
1922	Britânia (5)	Savóia
1923	Britânia (6)	Operário Ferroviário
1924	Palestra Itália (1)	Operário Ferroviário
1925	Atlético Paranaense (1)	Operário Ferroviário
1926	Palestra Itália (2)	Operário Ferroviário
1927	Coritiba (2)	Atlético Paranaense
1928	Britânia (7)	Atlético Paranaense
1929	Atlético Paranaense (2)	Operário Ferroviário
1930	Atlético Paranaense (3)	Operário Ferroviário
1931	Coritiba (3)	Guarani
1932	Palestra Itália (3)	Operário Ferroviário
1933	Coritiba (4)	Nova Rússia
1934	Atlético Paranaense (4)	Operário Ferroviário
1935	Coritiba (5)	Olinda
1936	Atlético Paranaense (5)	Operário Ferroviário
1937	Ferroviário (1)	Operário Ferroviário
1938	Ferroviário (2)	Operário Ferroviário
1939	Coritiba (6)	Pinheiral
1940	Atlético Paranaense (6)	Operário Ferroviário
1941	Coritiba (7)	Jacarezinho
1942	Coritiba (8)	Ferroviário
1943	Atlético Paranaense (7)	Coritiba
1944	Ferroviário (3)	Coritiba
1945	Atlético Paranaense (8)	Coritiba
1946	Coritiba (9)	Ferroviário
1947	Coritiba (10)	Ferroviário
1948	Ferroviário (4)	Atlético Paranaense
1949	Atlético Paranaense (9)	Ferroviário
1950	Ferroviário (5)	Coritiba
1951	Coritiba (11)	Jacarezinho
1952	Coritiba (12)	Palestra Itália
1953	Ferroviário (6)	Cambaraense
1954	Coritiba (13)	Jacarezinho
1955	Monte Alegre (1)	Ferroviário
1956	Coritiba (14)	Guarani
1957	Coritiba (15)	Ferroviário
1958	Atlético Paranaense (10)	Operário Ferroviário
1959	Coritiba (16)	Londrina
1960	Coritiba (17)	Mandaguari
1961	Comercial (1)	Operário Ferroviário
1962	Londrina (1)	Coritiba
1963	Grêmio Maringá (1)	Ferroviário
1964	Grêmio Maringá (2)	Seleto
1965	Ferroviário (7)	Grêmio Maringá
1966	Ferroviário (8)	União Bandeirante
1967	Água Verde (1)	Grêmio Maringá
1968	Coritiba (18)	Atlético Paranaense
1969	Coritiba (19)	Ferroviário
1970	Atlético Paranaense (11)	Coritiba
1971	Coritiba (20)	União Bandeirante
1972	Coritiba (21)	Atlético Paranaense
1973	Coritiba (22)	Atlético Paranaense
1974	Coritiba (23)	Atlético Paranaense
1975	Coritiba (24)	Colorado
1976	Coritiba (25)	Colorado
1977	Grêmio Maringá (3)	Coritiba
1978	Coritiba (26)	Atlético Paranaense
1979	Coritiba (27)	Colorado
1980	Cascavel EC (1)	Londrina
1980	Colorado (1)	Londrina
1981	Londrina (2)	Grêmio Maringá
1982	Atlético Paranaense (12)	Colorado
1983	Atlético Paranaense (13)	Coritiba
1984	Pinheiros (1)	Coritiba
1985	Atlético Paranaense (14)	Pinheiros
1986	Coritiba (28)	Pinheiros
1987	Pinheiros (2)	Atlético Paranaense
1988	Atlético Paranaense (15)	Pinheiros
1989	Coritiba (29)	União Bandeirante
1990	Atlético Paranaense (16)	Coritiba
1991	Paraná (1)	Atlético Paranaense
1992	Londrina (3)	União Bandeirante
1993	Paraná (2)	Londrina
1994	Paraná (3)	Londrina
1995	Paraná (4)	Coritiba
1996	Paraná (5)	Coritiba
1997	Paraná (6)	Atlético Paranaense
1998	Atlético Paranaense (17)	Coritiba
1999	Coritiba (30)	Paraná
2000	Atlético Paranaense (18)	Coritiba
2001	Atlético Paranaense (19)	Paraná
2002	Iraty (1)	Grêmio Maringá
2002 (S)	Atlético Paranaense (20)	Paraná
2003	Coritiba (31)	Paranavaí
2004	Coritiba (32)	Atlético Paranaense
2005	Atlético Paranaense (21)	Coritiba
2006	Paraná (7)	ADAP
2007	Paranavaí (1)	Paraná
2008	Coritiba (33)	Atlético Paranaense
2009	Atlético Paranaense (22)	J. Malucelli
2010	Coritiba (34)	Atlético Paranaense
2011	Coritiba (35)	Atlético Paranaense
2012	Coritiba (36)	Atlético Paranaense
2013	Coritiba (37)	Atlético Paranaense
2014	Londrina (4)	Maringá
2015	Operário Ferroviário (1)	Coritiba
2016	Atlético Paranaense (23)	Coritiba
2017	Coritiba (38)	Atlético Paranaense
2018	Atlético Paranaense (24)	Coritiba
2019	Athletico Paranaense (25)	Toledo
2020	Athletico Paranaense (26)	Coritiba
2021	Londrina (5)	FC Cascavel
2022	Coritiba (39)	Maringá
2023	Athletico Paranaense (27)	FC Cascavel
2024	Athletico Paranaense (28)	Maringá
2025	Operário Ferroviário (2)	Maringá
2026	Operário Ferroviário (3)	Londrina

=== Notes ===
- In 1924 Internacional and América merged into the Club Athletico Paranaense.
- In 1971 Britânia, Ferroviário and Palestra Itália merged into the Colorado Esporte Clube.
- In 1971 Água Verde and Savóia merged into the Esporte Clube Pinheiros.
- In 1989 Colorado and Pinheiros merged into the Paraná Clube.
- In 2002 Iraty won the official championship; clubs playing in the Copa Sul-Minas did not compete in this but instead played for the 'super championship', which was won by Atlético.

== Titles by team ==
Teams in bold still active.

Rank	Club	Winners	Winning years	Runners-up	Runners-up years
1	**Coritiba**	39	1916, 1927, 1931, 1933, 1935, 1939, 1941, 1942, 1946, 1947, 1951, 1952, 1954, 1956, 1957, 1959, 1960, 1968, 1969, 1971, 1972, 1973, 1974, 1975, 1976, 1978, 1979, 1986, 1989, 1999, 2003, 2004, 2008, 2010, 2011, 2012, 2013, 2017, 2022	23	1918, 1919, 1920, 1936, 1943, 1944, 1945, 1950, 1962, 1970, 1977, 1983, 1984, 1990, 1995, 1996, 1998, 2000, 2005, 2015, 2016, 2018, 2020
2	**Athletico Paranaense**	28	1925, 1929, 1930, 1934, 1936, 1940, 1943, 1945, 1949, 1958, 1970, 1982, 1983, 1985, 1988, 1990, 1998, 2000, 2001, 2002 (S), 2005, 2009, 2016, 2018, 2019, 2020, 2023, 2024	18	1927, 1928, 1948, 1968, 1972, 1973, 1974, 1978, 1987, 1991, 1997, 2004, 2008, 2010, 2011, 2012, 2013, 2017
3	Ferroviário	8	1937, 1938, 1944, 1948, 1950, 1953, 1965, 1966	7	1942, 1946, 1947, 1949, 1955, 1957, 1963
4	**Paraná**	7	1991, 1993, 1994, 1995, 1996, 1997, 2006	4	1999, 2001, 2002 (S), 2007
5	Britânia	7	1918, 1919, 1920, 1921, 1922, 1923, 1928	1	1916
6	**Londrina**	5	1962, 1981, 1992, 2014, 2021	5	1959, 1980, 1993, 1994, 2026
7	**Operário Ferroviário**	3	2015, 2025, 2026	14	1923, 1924, 1925, 1926, 1929, 1930, 1932, 1934, 1936, 1937, 1938, 1940, 1958, 1961
8	**Grêmio Maringá**	3	1963, 1964, 1977	4	1965, 1967, 1981, 2002
9	Palestra Itália	3	1924, 1926, 1932	1	1921
10	Pinheiros	2	1984, 1987	3	1985, 1986, 1988
11	Colorado	1	1980 (shared)	4	1975, 1976, 1979, 1982
12	Internacional	1	1915	1	1917
12	**Paranavaí**	1	2007	1	2003
14	Água Verde	1	1967	0	—
14	América	1	1917	0	—
14	Cascavel EC	1	1980 (shared)	0	—
14	Comercial	1	1961	0	—
14	**Iraty**	1	2002	0	—
14	Monte Alegre	1	1955	0	—
20	**Maringá**	0	—	4	2014, 2022, 2024, 2025
20	União Bandeirante	0	—	4	1966, 1971, 1989, 1992
22	Jacarezinho	0	—	3	1941, 1951, 1954
23	**FC Cascavel**	0	—	2	2021, 2023
23	Guarani	0	—	2	1931, 1956
25	ADAP	0	—	1	2006
25	Cambaraense	0	—	1	1953
25	J. Malucelli	0	—	1	2009
25	Mandaguari	0	—	1	1960
25	Nova Rússia	0	—	1	1933
25	Olinda	0	—	1	1935
25	Paraná SC	0	—	1	1915
25	Pinheiral	0	—	1	1939
25	Savóia	0	—	1	1922
25	Seleto	0	—	1	1964
25	**Toledo**	0	—	1	2019

=== By city ===
City	Championships	Clubs
Curitiba	98	Coritiba (39), Athletico Paranaense (28), Ferroviário (8), Britânia (7), Paraná (7), Palestra Itália (3), Pinheiros (2), Água Verde (1), América (1), Colorado (1), Internacional (1)
Londrina	5	Londrina (5)
Maringá	3	Grêmio Maringá (3)
Ponta Grossa	3	Operário Ferroviário (3)
Cascavel	1	Cascavel EC (1)
Cornélio Procópio	1	Comercial (1)
Irati	1	Iraty (1)
Paranavaí	1	Paranavaí (1)
Telêmaco Borba	1	Monte Alegre (1)

== See also ==
- Atle-Tiba
