= Campeonato Catarinense =

Football league in Santa Catarina, Brazil

- Organising body: FCF
- Founded: 1924; 102 years ago (as Liga de Florianópolis)
- Country: Brazil
- State: (Santa Catarina (state)) Santa Catarina
- Level on pyramid: 1
- Relegation to: Campeonato Catarinense Série B
- Domestic cup: Copa do Brasil
- Current champions: Barra (1st) (2026)
- Most championships: Avaí (19 titles)
- Website: FCF Official website
- Current: 2026 Campeonato Catarinense

The Campeonato Catarinense is the top-flight professional state football league in the Brazilian state of Santa Catarina. It is run by the Santa Catarina Football Federation (FCF).

== History ==
The Catarinense has had different names throughout its history. It started out as the Liga de Florianópolis (organised by the then Liga Santa Catharina de Desportos Terrestres) in its early years, and then changed to the Campeonato de Santa Catarina (Santa Catarina Championship) when it began to accept clubs from outside Florianópolis, the state capital.

Until 1924, sports in the Santa Catarina state were practiced by clubs that competed in various disciplines, including athletics, swimming, rowing, target shooting, and football. Competitions were held in the form of tournaments, athletic events, and friendly matches, with the winners being declared champions. Recognizing the need to unite the clubs under an entity that would officially guide and regulate the practice of these sports, the idea of establishing an organization to bring together practitioners of all sports disciplines emerged in Florianópolis.

On April 12, 1924, a group of sports enthusiasts gathered to found the Santa Catarina League of Land Sports (LCDT). Subsidized by the State Government, the LCDT took charge of organizing surface sports, including championships in athletics, target shooting, and football. It also affiliated itself with the Brazilian Sports Confederation (CBD). Until 1927, competitions were limited to clubs from the state capital Florianópolis.

On August 15, 1927, the LCDT was replaced by the Santa Catarina Sports Federation (FCD). The 1924, 1925 and 1926, editions of the Florianópolis Championship were later approved as the State Championship by the Santa Catarina Football Federation.

The FCD faced competition in the state capital when the Florianópolis Football League (LFF) was founded on May 7, 1937. Although affiliated with the FCD, the LFF assumed control of football in the capital. However, the growing practice of various sports disciplines across the state led to the creation of specific federations for each sport, leaving the FCD to oversee only football. As a result, in 1951, it was renamed the Santa Catarina Football Federation (FCF). The LFF was subsequently dissolved, and a capital football department was established. Efforts were made to encourage the creation of leagues in the interior regions, with affiliated clubs participating in official championships.

From 1986 to 2003, it was named Campeonato Catarinense Primeira Divisão (Santa Catarina Championship Premier Division). In 2004 and in 2005, the competition name was Série A1, and since 2006, the competition is named Divisão Principal (Top Division).

== Champions ==
Year	Champion	Runner-up	Highest scorer	Goals
Campeonato Catarinense
1924	Avaí	Trabalhista	Unavailable	-
1925	Externato	Avaí	Unavailable	-
1926	Avaí	Internato	Unavailable	-
1927	Avaí	Brasil	Unavailable	-
1928	Avaí	Brasil	Unavailable	-
1929	Caxias	Adolfo Konder	Raul (CAX)	3
1930	Avaí	Marcílio Dias	Periquito (AVA)	3
1931	Lauro Müller	Caxias	Cylo (CAX); Rebello (LAM)	2
1932	Figueirense	Brasil	Unavailable	-
1933	Unconcluded
1934	Atlético Catarinense	Iris	Leal (CAC)	10
1935	Figueirense	Iris	Calico (FIG)	9
1936	Figueirense	Iris	Unavailable	-
1937	Figueirense	Caxias	Abreu (PER); Otto (CAX); Raul (CAX)	2
1938	CIP	São Francisco	Nhonhô (ASF)	5
1939	Figueirense	Pery Ferroviário	Neri (FIG)	4
1940	Ypiranga	Avaí	Bujão (YPI); Saul (AVA)	3
1941	Figueirense	Caxias	Nhonhô (CAX)	6
1942	Avaí	América	Bráulio (AVA); Dirceu (ACR); Foguinho (HLU); Saul (AVA)	3
1943	Avaí	América	Saul (AVA)	6
1944	Avaí	Marcílio Dias	Felipinho (AVA); Teixeirinha (PAL)	9
1945	Avaí	Caxias	Saul (AVA)	6
1946	Not Held
1947	América	Palmeiras	Nicácio (AME)	5
1948	América	Paula Ramos	Zabot (AME)	8
1949	Olímpico	Avaí	Juarez (OLI); Nicolau (OLI)	9
1950	Carlos Renaux	Figueirense	Gil (FIG)	6
1951	América	Avaí	Bastinho (AME)	9
1952	América	Carlos Renaux	Renê (AME)	12
1953	Carlos Renaux	América	Otávio (ACR)	11
1954	Caxias	Ferroviário	Juarez (CAX)	18
1955	Caxias	Palmeiras	Didi (CAX)	6
1956	Operário	Paysandu	Den (OPE)	13
1957	Hercílio Luz	Carlos Renaux	Unavailable	-
1958	Hercílio Luz	Carlos Renaux	Petrusky (ACR)	20
1959	Paula Ramos	Caxias	Unavailable	-
1960	Metropol	Marcílio Dias	Norberto Hoppe (CAX)	9
1961	Metropol	Marcílio Dias	Unavailable	-
1962	Metropol	Marcílio Dias	Unavailable	-
1963	Marcílio Dias	Almirante Barroso	Unavailable	-
1964	Olímpico	Internacional	Unavailable	-
1965	Internacional	Metropol	Idézio (MET)	24
1966	Perdigão	Comercial	Norberto Hoppe (CAX)	33
1967	Metropol	Marcílio Dias	Valdomiro (COM)	18
1968	Comerciário	Caxias	Unavailable	-
1969	Metropol	América	Unavailable	-
1970	Ferroviário	Olímpico	Unavailable	-
1971	América	Próspera	Unavailable	-
1972	Figueirense	Avaí	Marcos (AME)	20
1973	Avaí	Juventus	Toninho (AVA)	18
1974	Figueirense	Internacional	Marcos (FIG)	13
1975	Avaí	Figueirense	Juti (AVA)	28
1976	Joinville	Juventus	Fontan (JOI); Tonho (JOI)	14
1977	Chapecoense	Avaí	Ademir (COM)	27
1978	Joinville	Chapecoense	Ademir (CRI)	19
1979	Joinville	Figueirense	Jorge (CHA)	23
1980	Joinville	Criciúma	Nunes (RDS)	25
1981	Joinville	Criciúma	Zé Carlos Paulista (JOI)	18
1982	Joinville	Criciúma	Paulinho Criciúma (CRI)	16
1983	Joinville	Figueirense	Albeneir (FIG)	23
1984	Joinville	Figueirense	Paulinho Cascavel (JOI)	27
1985	Joinville	Avaí	Jorge Veras (CRI)	21
Campeonato Catarinense Primeira Divisão
1986	Criciúma	Marcílio Dias	Wagner (JOI)	16
1987	Joinville	Criciúma	Ronaldo (CHA)	16
1988	Avaí	Blumenau	Joel (MDI)	18
1989	Criciúma	Joinville	Nardela (JOI)	19
1990	Criciúma	Joinville	Soares (CRI)	14
1991	Criciúma	Chapecoense	Toto (JUV)	19
1992	Brusque	Avaí	Zé Mello (INT)	16
1993	Criciúma	Figueirense	Severino Barbosa (CON)	23
1994	Figueirense	Criciúma	Alaor (JUV)	21
1995	Criciúma	Chapecoense	Paulo Rink (CHA)	23
1996	Chapecoense	Joinville	Marcos Paulo (JOI)	11
1997	Avaí	Tubarão	Jacaré (AVA); Luiz Carlos (JOI)	13
1998	Criciúma	Tubarão	Rogério (TUB)	16
1999	Figueirense	Avaí	Genílson (FIG)	26
2000	Joinville	Marcílio Dias	Ézio (FIG)	16
2001	Joinville	Criciúma	Mahicon Librelato (CRI)	19
2002	Figueirense	Criciúma	Tiago Freitas (AHA)	10
2003	Figueirense	Caxias	Delmer (CRI)	10
Série A1
2004	Figueirense	Hermann Aichinger	Ricardo (GUA); Vicente (CAX)	6
2005	Criciúma	Hermann Aichinger	Paty (AHA)	9
Divisão Principal
2006	Figueirense	Joinville	Cícero (Figueirense FC)	11
2007	Chapecoense	Criciúma	Maurício Duarte (Atlético Ibirama)	16
2008	Figueirense	Criciúma	Vandinho (Avaí FC)	21
2009	Avaí	Chapecoense	Bruno Cazarine (Chapecoense)	17
2010	Avaí	Joinville	Willian (Figueirense)	13
2011	Chapecoense	Criciúma	Lima (Joinville EC)	17
2012	Avaí	Figueirense	Aloísio (Figueirense FC); Rafael Costa (CA Metropolitano)	14
2013	Criciúma	Chapecoense	Rafael Costa (CA Metropolitano)	12
2014	Figueirense	Joinville	Régis (Chapecoense)	12
2015	Figueirense	Joinville	Victor Rangel (Guarani de Palhoça)	11
2016	Chapecoense	Joinville	Bruno Rangel (Chapecoense)	10
2017	Chapecoense	Avaí	Jonatas Belusso (Brusque); Wason Rentería (Atlético Tubarão)	11
2018	Figueirense	Chapecoense	Lima (Hercílio Luz); Rafael Grampola (Joinville)	9
2019	Avaí	Chapecoense	Daniel Amorim (Avaí)	9
2020	Chapecoense	Brusque	Edu (Brusque)	8
2021	Avaí	Chapecoense	Perotti (Chapecoense)	15
2022	Brusque	Camboriú	Alex Sandro (Brusque)	10
2023	Criciúma	Brusque	Adilson Bahia (Barra); Fabinho (Criciúma); Waguininho (Avaí)	5
2024	Criciúma	Brusque	Gabriel Poveda (Avaí)	8
2025	Avaí	Chapecoense	Mário Sérgio (Chapecoense)
2026	Barra	Chapecoense	Nicolas (Criciúma)	6

== Titles by team ==
Team	City	Titles (most recent)	Runners-up (most recent)
Avaí	Florianópolis	19 (2025)	10 (2017)
Figueirense	Florianópolis	18 (2018)	7 (2012)
Criciúma	Criciúma	12 (2024)	10 (2011)
Joinville	Joinville	12 (2001)	8 (2016)
Chapecoense	Chapecó	7 (2020)	10 (2026)
América	Joinville	5 (1971)	4 (1969)
Metropol	Criciúma	5 (1969)	1 (1965)
Caxias	Joinville	3 (1955)	7 (2003)
Carlos Renaux	Brusque	2 (1953)	3 (1958)
Brusque	Brusque	2 (2022)	3 (2024)
Olímpico	Blumenau	2 (1964)	1 (1970)
Hercílio Luz	Tubarão	2 (1958)	0
Marcílio Dias	Itajaí	1 (1963)	8 (2000)
Internacional	Lages	1 (1965)	2 (1974)
Ferroviário	Tubarão	1 (1970)	1 (1954)
Paula Ramos	Florianópolis	1 (1959)	1 (1948)
Externato	Florianópolis	1 (1925)	0
Lauro Müller	Itajaí	1 (1931)	0
Catarinense	Florianópolis	1 (1934)	0
CIP	Itajaí	1 (1938)	0
Ypiranga	São Francisco do Sul	1 (1940)	0
Operário	Joinville	1 (1956)	0
Perdigão	Videira	1 (1966)	0
Barra	Balneário Camboriú	1 (2026)	0
Blumenau	Blumenau	0	6 (1988)
Iris	Florianópolis	0	3 (1936)
Juventus	Rio do Sul	0	2 (1976)
Tubarão	Tubarão	0	2 (1998)
Hermann Aichinger	Ibirama	0	2 (2005)
Trabalhista	Florianópolis	0	1 (1924)
Adolfo Konder	Florianópolis	0	1 (1929)
São Francisco	São Francisco do Sul	0	1 (1938)
Pery Ferroviário	Mafra	0	1 (1939)
Paysandu	Brusque	0	1 (1956)
Almirante Barroso	Itajaí	0	1 (1963)
Comercial	Joaçaba	0	1 (1966)
Próspera	Criciúma	0	1 (1971)
Camboriú	Camboriú	0	1 (2022)

1. Teams in italic are not currently active in professional football.

=== Titles by City ===
City	Championships	Clubs
Florianópolis	40	Avaí (19), Figueirense (18), Atlético Catarinense (1), Externato (1), Paula Ramos (1)
Joinville	21	Joinville (12), América (5), Caxias (3), Operário (1)
Criciúma	17	Criciúma (12), Metropol (5)
Chapecó	7	Chapecoense (7)
Brusque	4	Brusque (2), Carlos Renaux (2)
Itajaí	3	CIP (1), Lauro Müller (1), Marcílio Dias (1)
Tubarão	3	Hercílio Luz (2), Ferroviário (1)
Blumenau	2	Olímpico (2)
Balneário Camboriú	1	Barra (1)
Lages	1	Inter de Lages (1)
São Francisco do Sul	1	Ypiranga (1)
Videira	1	Perdigão (1)

== Participation ==
=== Most appearances ===
As of 2025 season

Below is the list of clubs that have more appearances in the Campeonato Catarinense.

Club	App	First	Last
Avaí	83	1924	2025
Figueirense	79	1925	2025
Marcílio Dias	62	1930	2025
Criciúma	57	1955	2025
Chapecoense	52	1974	2025
Joinville	50	1976	2025
Blumenau	45	1927	1998
Hercílio Luz	40	1939	2025
Inter de Lages	38	1960	2024
Carlos Renaux	33	1929	1984
Caxias	33	1928	2006
Brusque	29	1988	2025
América de Joinville	27	1929	1975
Juventus	21	1976	2022
