= Serginho =

Serginho is a diminutive form of the given name Sérgio and may refer to:

== Footballers ==
- Serginho (footballer, born 1971), Brazilian footballer Sérgio Cláudio dos Santos
- Serginho (footballer, born 1972), Brazilian footballer Sérgio Eduardo Ferreira da Cunha
- Serginho (footballer, born 1974), Brazilian footballer Paulo Sérgio Oliveira da Silva, who suffered a cardiac arrest and died on the pitch in 2004
- Serginho (footballer, born 1978), Brazilian footballer Sérgio Severino da Silva, also known as Serginho Pernambucano
- Serginho (footballer, born 1979), Brazilian footballer Sérgio Henrique Silva Guedes
- Serginho (footballer, born May 1980), Brazilian football midfielder Sérgio Simões de Jesus
- Serginho Paulista (footballer, born 1980), Brazilian footballer Sérgio Rodrigo Penteado Dias, also known as Serginho Paulista
- Sérginho (footballer, born 1982), Portuguese footballer Sérgio Gabriel da Silva Andrade
- Serginho (footballer, born 1984), Brazilian footballer Sergio Henrique Francisco
- Serginho (footballer, born 1985), Portuguese footballer Sérgio Fernando Silva Rodrigues
- Serginho (footballer, born 1986), Brazilian footballer Sérgio Antônio Borges Júnior
- Serginho (footballer, born 1988), Brazilian footballer Sérgio Paulo Nascimento Filho
- Serginho (footballer, born 1990), Brazilian footballer Sérgio Ricardo dos Santos Júnior
- Serginho (footballer, born 1991), Portuguese footballer Sérgio Manuel Costa Carneiro
- Serginho (footballer, born 1993), Portuguese footballer Sérgio André Pereira Neves
- Serginho (footballer, born March 1995), Chinese-Brazilian footballer Sérgio Antônio Soler de Oliveira Junior
- Serginho (footballer, born April 1995), Brazilian footballer Sérgio Antonio De Luiz Junior
- Serginho (footballer, born 1996), Portuguese footballer Sérgio Daniel Sousa Silva
- Serginho (footballer, born 1999), Portuguese footballer Sérgio Miguel Lobo Araújo
- Sérginho (footballer, born 2000), Brazilian footballer Sérgio Costabile Elia
- Serginho (footballer, born 2001), Portuguese footballer Sérgio Pereira Andrade
- Serginho Baiano (born 1978), Brazilian footballer
- Serginho Catarinense (born 1984), also known as Serginho, Brazilian footballer
- Serginho Chulapa (born 1953), also known as Serginho, Brazilian footballer
- Sergio van Dijk (born 1982), Dutch footballer Serginho van Dijk
- Serginho Greene (born 1982), Dutch footballer
- Serginho Paulista (footballer, born 1988) (born 1988), Brazilian footballer Sérgio Mendes Coimbra

== Other people ==
- Dr. Serginho, Brazilian politician Sérgio Luiz Costa Azevedo Filho (born 1981)
- Serginho Groisman (born 1950), Brazilian television presenter and journalist
- Sérgio Moraes (born 1982), also known as Serginho, Brazilian mixed martial artist and Jiu-Jitsu fighter
- Sérgio Santos (volleyball) (born 1975), known as Serginho or Escadinha, Brazilian volleyball player

== See also ==
- Sergius (name)
