= Giovane (footballer, born 1982) =

Hong Kong footballer

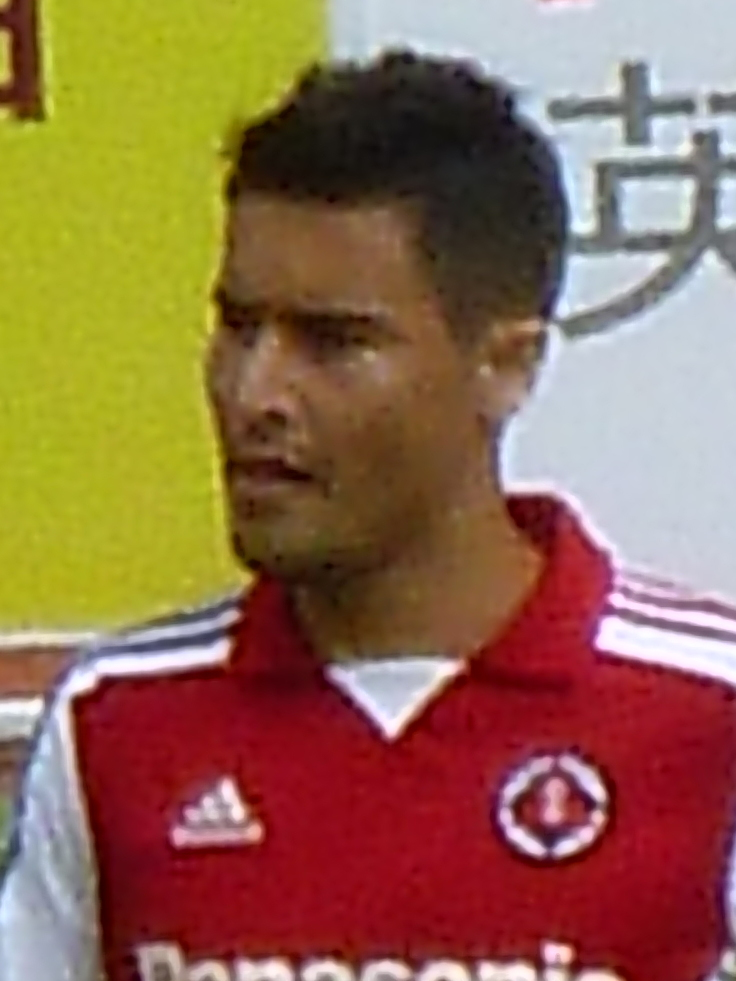

Personal information
- Full name: Giovane Alves da Silva
- Date of birth: 25 November 1982 (age 43)
- Place of birth: Taió, Santa Catarina, Brazil
- Height: 1.85 m (6 ft 1 in)
- Position: Striker

Senior career*
Years	Team	Apps	(Gls)
–2005	Marcílio Dias		
2006	Brusque		
2007	Hermann Aichinger		
2007–2009	Sun Hei	39	(30)
2009	Brusque		
2010	Hermann Aichinger		
2010	Guangdong Sunray Cave	23	(12)
2011–2012	South China	17	(5)
2012–2013	Hong Kong Rangers	15	(11)
2013–2017	Eastern	68	(49)
2017–2020	R&F	49	(24)
2023	Hong Kong Rangers	6	(1)

International career^{‡}
2018–2019	Hong Kong	6	(0)
- * Club domestic league appearances and goals as of 6 January 2024 ‡ National team caps and goals as of 18 December 2019

Giovane Alves da Silva (born 25 November 1982 in Taió, Santa Catarina, Brazil), commonly known as Giovane or 基奧雲尼 in Hong Kong, is a former professional footballer who played as a striker. Born in Brazil, he represented Hong Kong at international level.

== Club career ==
Giovane joined Sun Hei in 2007. He came to prominence the season after and bested fellow Brazilian Detinho to become the top scorer of that season with 26 goals. He became considered one of the best foreign players of the league after this achievement. He left the club to try pursuing a career in Europe but failed to land a contract, joining Brazilian clubs Brusque and Atlético Ibirama. In 2010, he joined Guangdong Sunray Cave, scoring 12 goals in 23 games. In December 2010 he returned to Hong Kong joining South China, scoring in his debut against Tuen Mun resulting in a 4–1 victory for his side. In 2012, he joined Biu Chun Rangers enjoying a fruitful spell. However, he was not kept as the club thinks he does not suit their playing style.

In 2013, Giovane joined Eastern and led the club in scoring for each of his four seasons at the club.

On 27 June 2017, R&F vice chairman Huang Shenghua announced that his club had signed Giovane on a free transfer. On 14 October 2020, he left the club after his club's withdrawal from the HKPL in the new season.

On 25 August 2023, after 3 years away from professional football, Giovane returned to HKPL and joined Rangers. He left the club on 6 January 2024.

== International career ==
Giovane received his Hong Kong passport in September 2018 and was called into manager Gary White's preliminary squad on 26 September 2018. On 11 October 2018, Giovane made his international debut for the national team in a friendly match against Thailand.

== Career statistics ==
=== Club ===
As of October 31, 2010

Club	Season	No.	Divisão Principal		Divisão Especial		Copa		—		—		Total	
Club	Season	No.	Apps	Goals	Apps	Goals	Apps	Goals	Apps	Goals	Apps	Goals	Apps	Goals
Brusque	2006	?	?	?	?	?	?	?	—	—	—	—	?	?
Brusque	Total								—	—	—	—		
Hermann Aichinger	2007	?	?	?	?	?	?	?	—	—	—	—	?	?
Hermann Aichinger	Total								—	—	—	—		
Club	Season	No.	League		Senior Shield		FA Cup		League Cup		AFC Cup		Total	
Club	Season	No.	Apps	Goals	Apps	Goals	Apps	Goals	Apps	Goals	Apps	Goals	Apps	Goals
Sun Hei	2006–07	22	—	—	—	—	1	0	—	—	—	—	1	0
Sun Hei	2007–08	22	17	12	1	0	2	2	5	5	2	1	27	20
Sun Hei	2008–09	22	22	18	4	2	1	0	4	6	—	—	31	26
Sun Hei	Total		39	30	5	2	4	2	9	11	2	1	58	46
Club	Season	No.	League		—		—		—		—		Total	
Club	Season	No.	Apps	Goals	Apps	Goals	Apps	Goals	Apps	Goals	Apps	Goals	Apps	Goals
Guangdong Sunray Cave	2010	9	23	12	—	—	—	—	—	—	—	—	23	12
Guangdong Sunray Cave	Total		23	12	—	—	—	—	—	—	—	—	23	12
Career Total														

=== International ===
As of matches played 18 December 2019.

National team	Year	Apps	Goals
Hong Kong	2018	1	0
Hong Kong	2019	5	0
Total		6	0

== Honours ==
South China

- Hong Kong FA Cup: 2010–11
- Hong Kong League Cup: 2010–11

Eastern

- Hong Kong Premier League: 2015–16
- Hong Kong Senior Shield: 2014–15, 2015–16
- Hong Kong FA Cup: 2013–14

Individual

- Hong Kong Footballer of the Year: 2015

Awards and achievements
Preceded by Victor Eromosele Inegbenoise	Hong Kong League Cup Top Scorer Award; 2007–08 (First title); 2008–09 (Second title)	Succeeded by Incumbent
Preceded by Tales Schutz	Hong Kong FA Cup Top Scorer Award (with Chen Zhizhao); 2007–08	Succeeded by Chan Siu Ki
Preceded by Detinho	Hong Kong First Division League top scorer 2008–09 (with Detinho)	Succeeded by Cahê
