= 2013 Campeonato Catarinense =

Campeonato Catarinense - Divisão Principal
- Season: 2013
- Champions: Criciúma
- Relegated: Guarani de Palhoça; Camboriú
- Série D: Metropolitano
- Matches: 96
- Goals: 287 (2.99 per match)
- Top goalscorer: Rafael Costa (13 goals)

The 2013 Campeonato Catarinense - Divisão Principal was the 90th season of Santa Catarina's top professional football league. The competition began on 19 January and ended on 19 May. Criciúma won the championship by the 10th time.

== Format ==
First stage

- All ten teams play a round-robin playing once against each other team.
- The best team in this stage qualifies to the Final Stage.

Second stage

- All ten teams play a round-robin playing once against each other team.
- The best team in this stage qualifies to the Final Stage.

Semifinal stage

- The two teams that won the first and the second stage are joined by the two best teams in the overall standings.
- Home-and-away playoffs between the teams.

Finals

- Home-and-away playoffs between the winners of the first and second stages.
- The winner of the Finals is crowned champion.

Relegation

- The two worst teams in the overall standings are relegated to the second division of Campeonato Catarinense.

== Teams ==
Club	Home city	2012 result
Atlético	Ibirama	6th
Avaí	Florianópolis	1st
Camboriú	Camboriú	8th
Chapecoense	Chapecó	3rd
Criciúma	Criciúma	7th
Figueirense	Florianópolis	2nd
Guarani	Palhoça	1st (From 2nd division)
Joinville	Joinville	4th
Juventus	Jaraguá do Sul	2nd (From 2nd division)
Metropolitano	Blumenau	5th

== First phase ==
=== First stage ===
Pos	Team	Pld	W	D	L	GF	GA	GD	Pts	Qualification
1	Chapecoense	9	7	1	1	21	9	+12	22	Advanced to the Final Stage
2	Figueirense	9	5	2	2	14	11	+3	17	
3	Metropolitano	9	5	0	4	12	13	−1	15	
4	Joinville	9	4	2	3	21	13	+8	14	
5	Juventus-SC	9	4	1	4	13	15	−2	13	
6	Avaí	9	3	3	3	12	14	−2	12	
7	Criciúma	9	3	2	4	17	11	+6	11	
8	Atlético de Ibirama	9	2	3	4	9	10	−1	9	
9	Camboriú	9	2	1	6	5	16	−11	7	
10	Guarani de Palhoça	9	2	1	6	8	20	−12	7	

==== Results ====
Home \ Away	ATL	AVA	CAM	CHA	CRI	FIG	GUA	JEC	JUV	MET
Atlético de Ibirama			0–0	1–1	1–1	1–2	1–0			
Avaí	1–0							2–2	2–1	1–2
Camboriú		0–1		0–3				2–1	1–2	2–0
Chapecoense		4–1			1–0		5–2		2–1	
Criciúma		1–1	6–0			2–0	0–1			
Figueirense		1–0	2–0	2–1				2–2	2–2	
Guarani de Palhoça		3–3	1–0			1–2		0–1		
Joinville	2–0			1–2	4–3		7–0			1–0
Juventus-SC	2–1				1–3			2–1		1–3
Metropolitano	1–4			1–2	2–1	2–1	1–0			

Updated to match(es) played on 30 July 2013. Source:
Legend: Blue = home team win; Yellow = draw; Red = away team win.

=== Second stage ===
Pos	Team	Pld	W	D	L	GF	GA	GD	Pts	Qualification
1	Criciúma	9	5	3	1	25	11	+14	18	Advanced to the Final Stage
2	Avaí	9	5	2	2	18	14	+4	17	
3	Atlético de Ibirama	9	4	3	2	16	10	+6	15	
4	Figueirense	9	4	3	2	16	10	+6	15	
5	Chapecoense	9	3	4	2	6	7	−1	13	
6	Guarani de Palhoça	9	3	2	4	9	12	−3	11	
7	Metropolitano	9	2	5	2	13	13	0	11	
8	Joinville	9	2	4	3	17	14	+3	10	
9	Juventus-SC	9	2	0	7	9	28	−19	6	
10	Camboriú	9	1	2	6	11	23	−12	5	

==== Results ====
Home \ Away	ATL	AVA	CAM	CHA	CRI	FIG	GUA	JEC	JUV	MET
Atlético de Ibirama		4–3						1–1	3–0	0–0
Avaí			3–1	2–0	2–2	2–1	2–0			
Camboriú	0–5				1–2	2–3	1–1			
Chapecoense	1–0		2–1			0–0		3–2		0–0
Criciúma	2–3			0–0				3–0	8–0	3–3
Figueirense	1–1				1–3		3–0			4–1
Guarani de Palhoça	1–0			0–0	1–2			2–1		3–1
Joinville		3–0	2–2			1–1			6–1	
Juventus-SC		2–3	1–3	2–0		0–2	2–1			
Metropolitano		1–1	4–0					1–1	2–1	

Updated to match(es) played on 30 July 2013. Source:
Legend: Blue = home team win; Yellow = draw; Red = away team win.

=== Overall standings ===
Pos	Team	Pld	W	D	L	GF	GA	GD	Pts	Qualification or relegation
1	Chapecoense	18	10	5	3	27	16	+11	35	Advanced to the Final Stage as stage winner
2	Figueirense	18	9	5	4	30	21	+9	32	Advanced to the Final Stage
3	Criciúma	18	8	5	5	42	22	+20	29	Advanced to the Final Stage as stage winner
4	Avaí	18	8	5	5	30	28	+2	29	Advanced to the Final Stage
5	Metropolitano	18	7	5	6	25	26	−1	26	
6	Joinville	18	6	6	6	38	27	+11	24	
7	Atlético de Ibirama	18	6	6	6	26	19	+7	24	
8	Juventus-SC	18	6	1	11	22	43	−21	19	
9	Guarani de Palhoça	18	5	3	10	17	32	−15	18	Relegated
10	Camboriú	18	3	3	12	16	39	−23	12	Relegated

== Final stage ==
Semifinals
Chapecoense	1	2	3
Figueirense	1	1	2
Criciúma (Note: Criciúma won in away goals)	2	1	3
Avaí	3	0	3

Finals
Chapecoense	0	1	1
Criciúma	2	0	2

=== Semi-finals ===
Team 1	Agg.	Team 2	1st leg	2nd leg
Chapecoense (Brazil)	3–2	(Brazil) Figueirense	1–1	2–1
Criciúma (Brazil)	3–3	(Brazil) Avaí	2–3	1–0

=== Finals ===
Team 1	Agg.	Team 2	1st leg	2nd leg
Chapecoense (Brazil)	1–2	(Brazil) Criciúma	0–2	1–0
