= 2008 Campeonato Catarinense =

The 83rd season of the Campeonato Catarinense will begin on January 16, 2008, and ended on May 4, 2008.

== Format ==
First stage

- Teams are divided into a groups of twelve teams.
- One round-robin, in which all teams from one group play games against all teams within the group.

Second stage

- Teams are divided into a groups of twelve teams.
- One round-robin, in which all teams from one group play games against all teams within the group.

Third stage

- Home-and-away playoffs with the top 2 teams of each stage.

The winner of the third stage is crowned the champion. The champions and the runner up qualify to Copa do Brasil 2009 and the champions qualify to Campeonato Brasileiro Série C 2008. The tree teams with the worst positions are release to Divisão Especial 2008.

== Participating teams ==
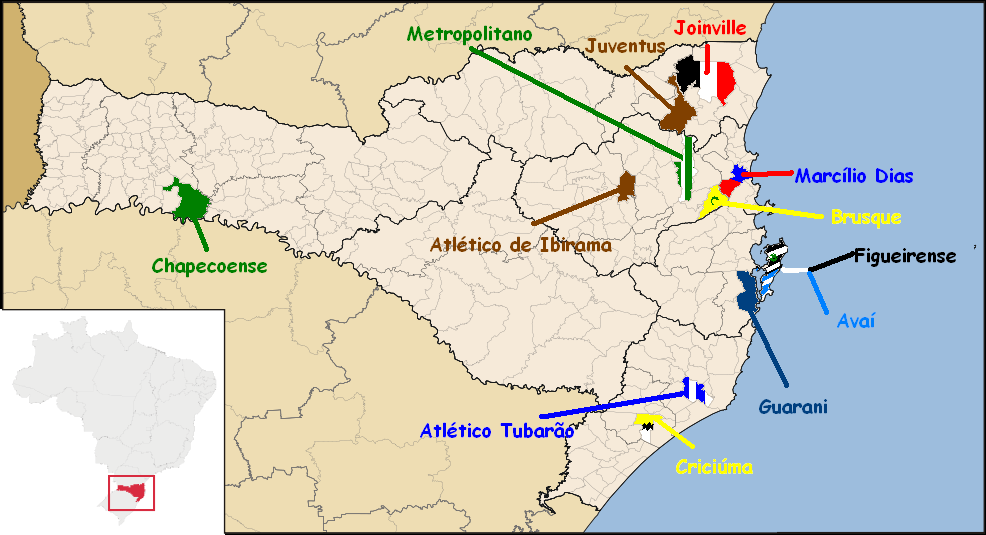
Campeonato Catarinense 2008 map

- Atlético de Ibirama - Ibirama
- Atlético Tubarão - Tubarão ²
- Avaí - Florianópolis
- Brusque - Brusque
- Chapecoense - Chapecó
- Criciúma - Criciúma
- Figueirense - Florianópolis
- Guarani - Palhoça
- Joinville - Joinville ¹
- Juventus - Jaraguá do Sul
- Metropolitano - Blumenau
- Marcílio Dias - Itajaí

¹ Divisão Especial 2007 Champion
² Divisão de Acesso 2007 Champion

== First stage ==
Final standings
Team		Pts	G	W	D	L	GF	GA	GD
1	Figueirense	25	11	7	4	0	28	13	+15
2	Criciúma	23	11	7	2	2	26	16	+10
3	Avaí	22	11	7	1	3	29	11	+18
4	Metropolitano	21	11	6	3	2	24	19	+5
5	Guarani	16	11	4	3	4	13	19	-6
6	Chapecoense	14	11	4	3	4	20	18	+2
7	Marcílio Dias	13	11	4	1	6	13	14	-1
8	Atlético de Ibirama	13	11	3	4	4	14	17	-3
9	Joinville	11	11	3	2	6	10	15	-5
10	Juventus	9	11	2	3	6	12	30	-18
11	Brusque	8	11	1	5	5	14	22	-8
12	Atlético Tubarão	6	11	0	6	5	22	31	-9
Pts – points earned; G – games played; W - wins; D - draws; L - losses; GF – goals for; GA – goals against; GD – goal differential

== Second stage ==
Final standings
Team		Pts	G	W	D	L	GF	GA	GD
1	Criciúma	25	11	7	4	0	27	12	+15
2	Avaí	24	11	7	3	1	31	9	+22*
3	Figueirense	21	11	7	0	4	30	18	+12
4	Atlético Tubarão	18	11	5	3	3	18	15	+3
5	Metropolitano	17	11	5	2	4	19	19	0
6	Joinville	16	11	4	4	3	17	16	+1
7	Marcílio Dias	16	11	4	4	3	23	24	-1
8	Atlético de Ibirama	12	11	3	3	5	16	20	-4*
9	Chapecoense	10	11	3	1	7	20	26	-6
10	Juventus	10	11	3	1	7	17	33	-16
11	Brusque	8	11	2	2	7	13	20	-7
12	Guarani	6	11	1	3	7	19	33	-14
Pts – points earned; G – games played; W - wins; D - draws; L - losses; GF – goals for; GA – goals against; GD – goal differential

* Atlético de Ibirama was punished, because of the "fall-fall", realized in the game Atlético x Avaí. The scores were changed from 2x0 to 3x0.

== Geral Standings ==
Final standings
Team		Pts	G	W	D	L	GF	GA	GD
1	Criciúma	48	22	14	6	2	53	28	+25
2	Avaí	46	22	14	4	4	60	20	+40
3	Figueirense	46	22	14	4	4	58	31	+27
4	Metropolitano	38	22	11	5	6	43	39	+4
5	Marcílio Dias	29	22	8	5	9	36	38	-2
6	Joinville	27	22	7	6	9	27	31	-4
7	Atlético de Ibirama	25	22	6	7	9	30	37	-7
8	Chapecoense	24	22	7	3	12	40	44	-4
9	Atlético Tubarão	24	22	5	9	8	40	46	-6
10	Guarani	21	22	5	6	11	32	52	-20
11	Juventus	19	22	5	4	13	27	63	-36
12	Brusque	16	22	3	7	11	27	45	-18
Pts – points earned; G – games played; W - wins; D - draws; L - losses; GF – goals for; GA – goals against; GD – goal differential

Qualify to Copa do Brasil de 2009 and to Campeonato Catarinense 2008 Final
Qualify to Campeonato Brasileiro Série C 2008
Relegated to Divisão Especial 2008.

== Third stage ==
Final standings
Team		Pts	G	W	D	L	AET
1	Figueirense	3	2	1	0	1	1
2	Criciúma	3	2	1	0	1	0
Pts – points earned; G – games played; W - wins; D - draws; L - losses; AET - Extra time goals

Campeonato Catarinense 2008 Champions.

1st Stage Champions	2nd Stage Champions	Game 1	Game 2*	Extra Time*
Figueirense	Criciúma	1-0	1-3	1-0

* In Criciúma, because the Criciúma have better Punctuation in the two stages (Stage 1 points + Stage 2 points).

== Results ==
=== Tablewise ===
	AIB	ATU	AVA	BRU	CHA	CRI	FIG	GUA	JOI	JUV	MAD	MET
Atlético de Ibirama	—	2x1	0x2	1x1	2x0	1x1	0x3	2x1	0x0	5x0	0x0	3x1
Atlético Tubarão	4x3	—	0x3	3x3	2x1	0x0	3x3	2x4	0x1	4x4	2x2	2x2
Avaí	6x0	1x1	—	3x0	2x3	1x1	0x3	5x0	3x0	5x0	2x1	2x2
Brusque	2x3	0x2	0x1	—	1x3	2x5	2x2	1x1	1x0	1x1	0x2	2x0
Chapecoense	1x1	2x2	0x6	4x2	—	2x5	1x3	6x1	1x2	3x0	2x0	2x3
Criciúma	1x0	4x4	1x0	1x0	3x1	—	3x1	3x2	1x1	4x1	5x1	2x1
Figueirense	4x2	1x0	0x2	6x4	2x1	4x2	—	6x2	4x0	5x1	2x3	1x1
Guarani	2x1	0x1	1x2	0x0	0x3	3x2	0x0	—	2x1	5x5	2x2	2x3
Joinville	0x0	3x1	0x3	3x1	2x2	2x2	0x1	3x1	—	5x1	0x1	2x0
Juventus	1x0	2x5	0x4	2x1	1x0	0x2	1x0	0x0	3x0	—	1x3	2x4
Marcílio Dias	3x3	1x0	4x3	1x2	2x1	0x1	1x3	1x2	2x2	5x0	—	1x4
Metropolitano	2x1	4x1	3x3	1x1	2x1	1x4	2x4	3x1	1x0	2x1	1x0	—

- First Stage Games
- Second Stage Games

== Other Divisions ==
Divisão Especial: 12 Teams

- Champion: Brusque - Qualify to Divisão Principal 2009
- Runner-up: Juventus
- 10th Place: Inter de Lages - Release to Divisão de Acesso 2009
- 11th Place: Grêmio Timbó - Release to Divisão de Acesso 2009
- 12th Place: Guarani - Release to Divisão de Acesso 2009

Divisão de Acesso: 5 Teams

- Champion: Porto - Qualify to Divisão Especial 2009
- Runner-up:Videira - Qualify to Divisão Especial 2009

== Champion ==
Campeonato Catarinense 2008:
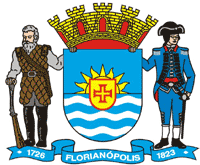
Figueirense
15th Title
