= Jacaré (footballer, born 1971) =

Brazilian footballer (born 1971)

Personal information
- Full name: Ermison José Leopoldo
- Date of birth: 4 April 1971 (age 55)
- Place of birth: Florianópolis, Brazil
- Height: 1.85 m (6 ft 1 in)
- Position: Forward

Senior career*
Years	Team	Apps	(Gls)
1991–1993	Avaí		
1993	Operário de Mafra		
1994–1996	Avaí		
1995	Kuala Lumpur		
1996	Grêmio		
1996	Londrina		
1997	Avaí		
1997–1998	Boavista		
1998	América-RN		
1999	Avaí		
2000–2001	Porto-PE		
2001	Náutico		
2002	Santa Cruz		
2003–2004	Atlético de Ibirama		
- * Club domestic league appearances and goals as of 20 April 2024

Ermison José Leopoldo (born 4 April 1971), better known by the nickname Jacaré, is a Brazilian former professional footballer who played as a forward.

== Career ==
Having started his professional career at Avaí, Jacaré played most of his life at the club, where he was state champion in 1997, being top scorer in the competition. In the same year, he moved to Portugal where he was part of the Taça de Portugal-winning squad with Boavista F.C.

== Honours ==
Avaí

- Campeonato Catarinense: 1997
- Campeonato Catarinense Série B: 1994

Grêmio

- Campeonato Gaúcho: 1996

Boavista

- Taça de Portugal: 1996–97
- Supertaça Cândido de Oliveira: 1997

Individual

- 1997 Campeonato Catarinense top scorer: 13 goals
