= 2005 Campeonato Catarinense =

The 80th season of the Campeonato Catarinense began on January 23, 2005, and ended on April 17, 2005.

== Format ==
Série A1

First stage

- Teams are divided into two groups of six teams.
- Double round-robin, in which all teams from one group play home-and-away games against all teams within the group.

Second stage

- Top 4 teams from each group of first stage are divided into two groups of four teams.
- Double round-robin, in which all teams from one group play home-and-away games against all teams within the group.

Third stage

- Home-and-away playoffs with the top 2 teams of each group.

The winner of the third stage is crowned the champion. The champion qualify to Campeonato Brasileiro Série C 2005 and qualify to Copa do Brasil 2006

The teams that do not participate in Brazilian Série A and Brazilian Série B will participate in Série A2.

== First stage ==
Group A

Final standings
Team		Pts	G	W	D	L	GF	GA	GD
1	Atlético de Ibirama	25	10	8	1	1	21	10	+11
2	Avaí	22	10	7	1	2	18	10	+8
3	Figueirense	18	10	5	3	2	28	10	+18
4	Guarani	13	10	4	1	5	16	18	-2
5	Chapecoense	8	10	2	2	6	11	20	-9
6	União de Timbó	0	10	0	0	10	11	37	-26
Pts – points earned; G – games played; W - wins; D - draws; L - losses; GF – goals for; GA – goals against; GD – goal differential

Group B

Final standings
Team		Pts	G	W	D	L	GF	GA	GD
1	Joinville	21	10	6	3	1	18	9	+9
2	Metropolitano	16	10	4	4	2	11	9	+2
3	Marcílio Dias	15	10	4	3	3	15	17	-2
4	Criciúma	13	10	3	4	3	15	12	+3
5	Lages	10	10	2	4	4	10	14	-4
6	Tubarão	5	10	1	2	7	16	24	-8
Pts – points earned; G – games played; W - wins; D - draws; L - losses; GF – goals for; GA – goals against; GD – goal differential

== Second stage ==
Group C

Final standings
Team		Pts	G	W	D	L	GF	GA	GD
1	Criciúma	11	6	3	2	1	12	8	+4
2	Atlético de Ibirama	10	6	3	1	2	11	11	0
3	Figueirense	6	6	1	3	2	3	5	-2
4	Metropolitano	5	6	1	2	3	7	9	-2
Pts – points earned; G – games played; W - wins; D - draws; L - losses; GF – goals for; GA – goals against; GD – goal differential

Group D

Final standings
Team		Pts	G	W	D	L	GF	GA	GD
1	Joinville	11	6	3	2	1	10	6	+4
2	Avaí	10	6	3	1	2	7	6	+1
3	Guarani	9	6	3	0	3	7	8	-1
4	Marcílio Dias	4	6	1	1	4	7	11	-4
Pts – points earned; G – games played; W - wins; D - draws; L - losses; GF – goals for; GA – goals against; GD – goal differential

== Third stage ==
=== Semi-finals ===
Team 1	Result	Team 2	Game 1*	Game 2
Avaí	4-5	Criciúma	3-2	1-3
Atlético de Ibirama	3-1	Joinville	1-0	2-2

*The first games were played in Team 1 Stadium
Italic: Teams qualify to Final

=== Final ===
champion	Result	runner-up	Game 1*	Game 2
Criciúma	2-1	Atlético de Ibirama	1-1	1-0

* The Game 2 was played in Ibirama, because the Clube Atlético Hermann Aichinger (Atlético de Ibirama) had better Punctuation in the two stages (Stage 1 points + Stage 2 points).

== Final standings ==
Final standings
1	Criciúma
2	Atlético de Ibirama*
3	Avaí
4	Joinville
5	Figueirense
6	Guarani
7	Metropolitano
8	Marcílio Dias
9	Lages
10	Chapecoense
11	Tubarão
12	União de Timbó

Qualify to Copa do Brasil 2006
Qualify to Campeonato Brasileiro Série C 2005 and Copa do Brasil 2006

* Atlético de Ibirama qualify to Série C, because Criciúma already was qualify to Serie B.

== Other Divisions ==
Série A2: 12 Teams

- Champion: Joinville
- Runner-up: Marcílio Dias - Qualify to Campeonato Brasileiro Série C 2005*

* Marcílio Dias qualify to Série C, because Joinville already was qualify to Serie C

Série B1: 10 teams

- Champion: Próspera - Qualify to Divisão Especial 2006*
- Runner-up: Figueirense B - The team was disactivate
- Third Place: Cidade Azul - Qualify to Divisão Especial 2006*

*The Serie A2 transformed in 2006 in Divisão Especial and Série B1 in Divisão de Accesso

== Champion ==
Campeonato Catarinense 2005:
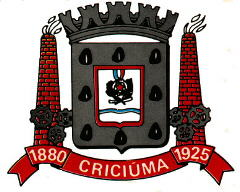
Criciúma
9th Title
