= 2006 Campeonato Catarinense =

The 81st season of the Campeonato Catarinense began on January 11, 2006, and ended on April 9, 2006.

== Format ==
Divisão Principal

First stage

- Teams are divided into two groups of six teams.
- Double round-robin, in which all teams from one group play home-and-away games against all teams within the group.

Second stage

- Top 4 teams from each group of first stage are divided into two groups of four teams.
- Double round-robin, in which all teams from one group play home-and-away games against all teams within the group.

Third stage

- Home-and-away playoffs with the top 2 teams of each group.

The winner of the third stage is crowned the champion. The champion qualify to Campeonato Brasileiro Série C 2006 and qualify to Copa do Brasil 2007

The teams that do not participate in Brazilian Série A and Brazilian Série B will participate in Divisão Especial.

== First stage ==
Group A

Final standings
Team		Pts	G	W	D	L	GF	GA	GD
1	Figueirense	21	10	6	3	1	19	9	+10
2	Juventus	19	10	6	1	3	22	14	+8
3	Avaí	16	10	5	1	4	22	11	+11
4	Atlético de Ibirama	11	10	2	5	3	12	17	-5
5	Guarani	10	10	3	1	6	9	24	-15
6	Chapecoense	6	10	1	3	6	11	20	-9
Pts – points earned; G – games played; W - wins; D - draws; L - losses; GF – goals for; GA – goals against; GD – goal differential

Group B

Final standings
Team		Pts	G	W	D	L	GF	GA	GD
1	Brusque	23	10	7	2	1	27	15	+12
2	Marcílio Dias	16	10	5	1	4	13	10	+3
3	Metropolitano	16	10	4	4	2	17	13	+4
4	Joinville	14	10	4	2	4	19	17	+2
5	Criciúma	13	10	4	1	5	19	15	+4
6	Caxias	2	10	0	2	8	9	34	-25
Pts – points earned; G – games played; W - wins; D - draws; L - losses; GF – goals for; GA – goals against; GD – goal differential

== Second stage ==
Group C

Final standings
Team		Pts	G	W	D	L	GF	GA	GD
1	Joinville	11	6	3	2	1	10	6	+4
2	Figueirense	10	6	3	1	2	15	10	+5
3	Marcílio Dias	6	6	1	3	2	9	13	-4
4	Avaí	5	6	1	2	3	5	10	-5
Pts – points earned; G – games played; W - wins; D - draws; L - losses; GF – goals for; GA – goals against; GD – goal differential

Group D

Final standings
Team		Pts	G	W	D	L	GF	GA	GD
1	Atlético de Ibirama	11	6	3	2	1	10	6	+4
2	Juventus	10	6	3	1	2	6	8	-2
3	Metropolitano	7	6	2	1	3	9	9	0
4	Brusque	5	6	1	2	3	10	12	-2
Pts – points earned; G – games played; W - wins; D - draws; L - losses; GF – goals for; GA – goals against; GD – goal differential

== Third stage ==
=== Semi-finals ===
Team 1	Result	Team 2	Game 1*	Game 2
Juventus	0-5	Joinville	0-1	2-2
Figueirense	5-2	Atlético de Ibirama	3-1	1-2

*The first games were played in Team 1 Stadium
Italic: Teams qualify to Final

=== Final ===
champion	Result	runner-up	Game 1*	Game 2
Figueirense	4-2	Joinville	1-2	3-0

* The Game 2 was played in Florianópolis, because the Figueirense Futebol Clube had better Punctuation in the two stages (Stage 1 points + Stage 2 points).

== Final standings ==
Final standings
1	Figueirense
2	Joinville*
3	Juventus
4	Atlético de Ibirama
5	Brusque
6	Metropolitano
7	Marcílio Dias
8	Avaí
9	Criciúma
10	Guarani
11	Chapecoense
12	Caxias

Qualify to Copa do Brasil 2007
Qualify to Campeonato Brasileiro Série C 2006

* Joinville qualify to Série C, because Figueirense already was qualify to Serie A.

== Other Divisions ==
Divisão Especial: 12 Teams

- Champion: Joinville
- Runner-up: Marcílio Dias - Qualify to Campeonato Brasileiro Série C 2006*
- 11th placed: Cidade Azul - Release to Divisão de Accesso 2006
- 12th placed: Lages - Release to Divisão de Accesso 2006

* Marcílio Dias qualify to Série C, because Joinville already was qualify to Serie C

Divisão de Accesso: 10 teams

- Champion: Camboriuense - Qualify to Divisão Especial 2007
- Runner-up: Videira - Qualify to Divisão Especial 2007

== Champion ==
Campeonato Catarinense 2006:
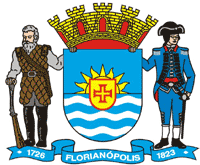
Figueirense
14th Title
