= Tonho (footballer, born 1950) =

Brazilian footballer (1950–2001)

Personal information
- Full name: Antônio Martes da Luz
- Date of birth: 20 August 1950
- Place of birth: São Francisco do Sul, Brazil
- Date of death: 1 January 2001 (aged 50)
- Place of death: Araquari, Brazil
- Position: Forward

Senior career*
Years	Team	Apps	(Gls)
1969–1975	América de Joinville		
1976–1978	Joinville		
1979	Carlos Renaux		
1979–1980	Juventus-SC		
- * Club domestic league appearances and goals

Antônio Martes da Luz (20 August 1950 – 1 January 2001), better known as Tonho, was a Brazilian professional footballer who played as a forward.

== Career ==
Revealed by América de Joinville, Tonho was integrated as a Joinville athlete when his club merged with Caxias FC. He scored the first goal in the club's history, top scorer as well as champion in 1976 and 1978. He stood out for his header goals.

== Death ==
Tonho died on 1 January 2001, in a car accident near the city of Araquari, returning from a New Year's Eve celebration.

== Honours ==
América de Joinville

- Campeonato Catarinense: 1971

Joinville

- Campeonato Catarinense: 1976, 1978

Individual

- 1976 Campeonato Catarinense top scorer: 14 goals
