= Serginho Paulista =

Serginho Paulista may refer to:

- Serginho Paulista (footballer, born 1980), Brazilian football right-back
- Serginho Paulista (footballer, born 1988), Brazilian football defensive midfielder
