= Zé Carlos (footballer, born 1956) =

Brazilian footballer

Personal information
- Full name: José Carlos Raymundo
- Date of birth: 2 October 1956 (age 70)
- Place of birth: Minduri, Brazil
- Position: Forward

Senior career*
Years	Team	Apps	(Gls)
1978–1983	Joinville		
1979	→ Anapolina (loan)		
1983	→ Palmeiras (loan)		
1984	Criciúma		
1985	Anapolina		
1987	EC São Bernardo		
1988	Santo André		
1988	Minas Boa Esperança		
1989	Pouso Alegre		

Managerial career
- 2018: Joinville (women)
- * Club domestic league appearances and goals as of 28 February 2024

José Carlos Raymundo (born 2 October 1956), better known as Zé Carlos or Zé Carlos Paulista, is a Brazilian former professional footballer who played as a forward.

== Career ==
Born in Minduri, Minas Gerais, Zé Carlos was part of the Joinville squad from 1978 to 1983, being five times Santa Catarina champion and top scorer in the 1981 edition. He also played for Palmeiras, Anapolina, Criciúma, EC São Bernardo, Santo André and Pouso Alegre.

== Honours ==
Joinville

- Campeonato Catarinense: 1979, 1980, 1981, 1982, 1983

Individual

- 1981 Campeonato Catarinense top scorer: 18 goals
