= Nardela =

Brazilian footballer

Personal information
- Full name: Reinaldo Antônio Baldessin
- Date of birth: 1 January 1958 (age 68)
- Place of birth: Piracicaba, Brazil
- Height: 1.71 m (5 ft 7 in)
- Position: Midfielder

Youth career
- XV de Piracicaba

Senior career*
| Years | Team | Apps | (Gls) |
| 1974–1978 | XV de Piracicaba | | |
| 1976 | → Portuguesa (loan) | 14 | (2) |
| 1978–1979 | Joinville | | |
| 1979–1980 | Grêmio | 57 | (15) |
| 1980 | Guarani | | |
| 1980–1990 | Joinville | | |
| 1990 | Vitória | | |
| 1991 | Coritiba | | |
| 1992–1993 | Joinville | | |
| 1993 | Blumenau | | |
| 1994 | Hercílio Luz | | |
| 1995 | Brusque | | |
| 1998 | Sãocarlense | | |

International career
| 1977 | Brazil U20 | | |
- * Club domestic league appearances and goals as of 24 March 2024

Reinaldo Antônio Baldessin (born 1 January 1958), better known as Nardela, is a Brazilian former professional footballer who played as a midfielder.

== Career ==
Born in Piracicaba, Nardela began his career in the XV de Novembro youth sectors. He was part of the Brazilian under-20 team that competed in the 1977 South American U-20 Championship and 1977 FIFA World Youth Championship. He was loaned to Portuguesa in 1976 and later had his first spell at Joinville, a team for which he made more than 680 appearances during his career, scored 130 goals and was state champion seven times, being top scorer in 1989. He also played for Grêmio where he made 57 appearances, scored 15 goals and won the state championship in 1979.

Nardela was elected in the ideal XI of the first 35 years of Joinville EC's history.

== Honours ==
Grêmio

- Campeonato Gaúcho: 1979

Joinville

- Campeonato Catarinense: 1980, 1981, 1982, 1983, 1984, 1985, 1987

Individual

- 1989 Campeonato Catarinense top scorer: 19 goals
