= Estádio da Baixada (Ibirama) =

Multi-use stadium in Ibirama, Santa Catarina, Brazil

Estádio Hermann Aichinger
- Estádio da Baixada
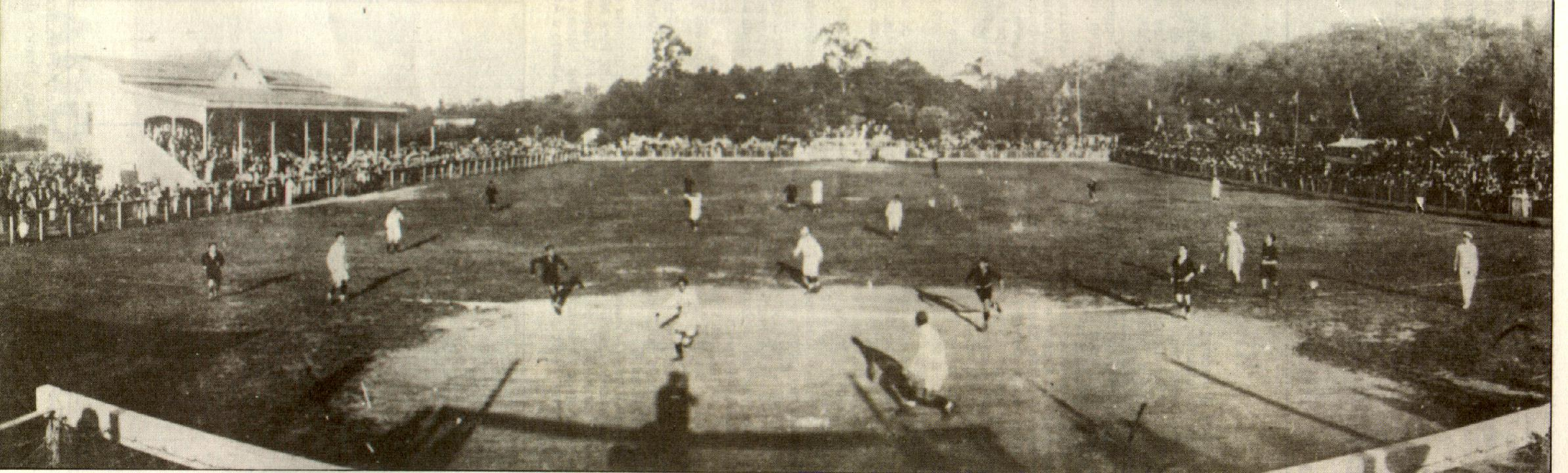
- Interactive map of Estádio Hermann Aichinger
- Location: Ibirama, Santa Catarina, Brazil
- Coordinates: 27.06°S 49.52°W
- Owner: Clube Atlético Hermann Aichinger
- Capacity: 6,000
- Surface: Grass

Construction
- Renovated: 2003

Tenant
- Clube Atlético Hermann Aichinger

Estádio Hermann Aichinger, better known as Estádio da Baixada, is a multi-use stadium located in Ibirama, Santa Catarina state, in southern Brazil. It is used mostly for football matches and hosts the home games of Clube Atlético Hermann Aichinger. The stadium has a maximum capacity of 6,000 people.
