= 2007 Campeonato Catarinense =

The 82nd season of the Campeonato Catarinense began on January 17, 2007, and ended on May 6, 2007.

== Format ==
First stage

- Teams are divided into a groups of twelve teams.
- One round-robin, in which all teams from one group play games against all teams within the group.

Second stage

- Teams are divided into a groups of twelve teams.
- One round-robin, in which all teams from one group play games against all teams within the group.

Third stage

- Home-and-away playoffs with the top 2 teams of each stage.

The winner of the third stage is crowned the champion. The champions and the runner up qualify to Copa do Brasil 2008 and the champions qualify to Campeonato Brasileiro Série C 2007. The two teams with the worst positions are release to Divisão Especial 2007.

== First stage ==
Final standings
Team		Pts	G	W	D	L	GF	GA	GD
1	Criciúma	28	11	9	1	1	24	9	+15
2	Juventus	25	11	8	1	2	31	15	+16
3	Atlético de Ibirama	17	11	4	5	2	16	12	+4
4	Chapecoense	17	11	4	5	2	14	12	+2
5	Brusque	14	11	3	5	3	14	12	+2
6	Guarani	13	11	4	1	6	14	17	-3
7	Figueirense	12	11	4	0	7	16	16	0
8	Avaí	12	11	3	3	5	14	17	-3
9	Metropolitano	12	11	3	3	5	15	20	-5
10	Marcílio Dias	11	11	2	5	4	8	13	-5
11	Joinville	11	11	2	5	4	19	28	-9
12	Próspera	8	11	2	2	7	14	27	-13
Pts – points earned; G – games played; W - wins; D - draws; L - losses; GF – goals for; GA – goals against; GD – goal differential

== Second stage ==
Final standings
Team		Pts	G	W	D	L	GF	GA	GD
1	Chapecoense	29	11	9	2	0	24	11	+13
2	Criciúma	26	11	8	2	1	27	13	+14
3	Avaí	24	11	7	3	1	27	14	+13
4	Figueirense	21	11	6	3	2	24	16	+8
5	Atlético de Ibirama	20	11	6	2	3	21	16	+5
6	Guarani	14	11	4	2	5	18	22	-4
7	Metropolitano	11	11	3	2	6	14	20	-6
8	Brusque	9	11	2	3	6	14	24	-10
9	Joinville	8	11	2	2	7	12	20	-8
10	Marcílio Dias	8	11	2	2	7	16	26	-10
11	Juventus	4	11	1	1	9	13	25	-12
12	Próspera†	-1	11	3	2	6	16	27	-11
Pts – points earned; G – games played; W - wins; D - draws; L - losses; GF – goals for; GA – goals against; GD – goal differential

† Próspera received a 12 points deduction penalty for fielding an ineligible player.

== Third stage ==
Final standings
Team		Pts	G	W	D	L
1	Chapecoense	4	2	1	1	0
2	Criciúma	1	2	0	1	1
Pts – points earned; G – games played; W - wins; D - draws; L - losses;

Campeonato Catarinense 2007 Champions.

1st Stage Champions	2nd Stage Champions	Game 1	Game 2*
Criciúma	Chapecoense	0-1	2-2

* In Criciúma, because the Criciúma have better Punctuation in the two stages (Stage 1 points + Stage 2 points).

== Final standings ==
Final standings
Team		Pts	G	W	D	L	GF	GA	GD
1	Chapecoense	50	24	14	8	2	42	25	+17
2	Criciúma	55	24	17	4	3	53	25	+28
3	Atlético de Ibirama	37	22	10	7	5	37	28	+9
4	Avaí	36	22	10	6	6	41	31	+10
5	Figueirense	33	22	10	3	9	40	32	+8
6	Juventus	29	22	9	2	11	44	40	+4
7	Guarani	27	22	8	3	11	32	39	-7
8	Metropolitano	23	22	6	5	11	29	40	-11
9	Brusque	23	22	5	8	9	30	31	-1
10	Marcílio Dias	19	22	4	7	11	24	39	-15
11	Joinville	19	22	4	7	11	31	48	-17
12	Próspera†	7	22	5	4	13	30	54	-24
Pts – points earned; G – games played; W - wins; D - draws; L - losses; GF – goals for; GA – goals against; GD – goal differential

Qualify to Copa do Brasil 2008 and Campeonato Brasileiro Série C 2007.
Qualify to Copa do Brasil 2008.
Release to Divisão Especial 2007.

† Próspera received a 12 points deduction penalty for fielding an ineligible player.

== Results ==
=== Tablewise ===
	AIB	AVA	BRU	CHA	CRI	FIG	GUA	JOI	JUV	MAD	MET	PRO
Atlético de Ibirama		1×1	1×0	2×3	1×1	1×0	2×1	3×1	2×0	1×1	4×0	5×1
Avaí	3×0		2×1	4×0	1×3	0×1	3×2	2×1	1×2	1×0	5×1	4×1
Brusque	0×0	0×1		0×2	1×2	2×2	2×0	2×2	2×3	2×1	2×2	2×1
Chapecoense	2×0	2×2	0×0		2×1	1×0	3×2	2×0	1×0	1×1	1×0	2×0
Criciúma	4×2	2×2	3×2	2×1		2×1	3×0	3×0	2×1	3×0	4×2	3×1
Figueirense	1×2	3×0	1×2	2×2	0×1		4×4	5×2	2×1	1×0	4×1	1×3
Guarani	1×1	1×1	0×4	0×2	0×1	2×1		1×2	1×0	4×2	2×1	3×2
Joinville	2×2	4×2	1×1	4×4	0×1	1×2	0×2		1×4	2×1	2×2	1×2
Juventus	4×2	1×2	3×2	1×1	1×0	0×1	3×1	2×2		2×4	4×2	2×4
Marcílio Dias	1×1	3×3	0×0	0×1	1×5	2×4	1×4	1×1	2×0		1×0	1×0
Metropolitano	1×2	1×0	2×1	0×0	1×1	2×1	0×1	1×2	4×2	2×0		4×1
Próspera	0×2	1×1	2×2	2×5	2×4	1×3	1×0	3×0	1×8	1×1	0×0	

- First Stage Games
- Second Stage Games

== Other Divisions ==
Divisão Especial: Four Teams

- Champion: Joinville - Qualify to Divisão Principal 2008
- Runner-up: Camboriuense - Release to Divisão de Acesso 2007
- Third Place: Próspera - Release to Divisão de Acesso 2007
- Fourth Place: Videira - Release to Divisão de Acesso 2007

Divisão de Acesso: 16 Teams

- Champion: Atlético Tubarão - Qualify to Divisão Principal 2008
- Runner-up:Catarinense (Ilhota)

== Champion ==
Campeonato Catarinense 2007:
Chapecoense
Third Title
