= Norberto Hoppe =

Brazilian footballer (1941–2019)

Personal information
- Full name: Norberto Hoppe
- Date of birth: 28 June 1941
- Place of birth: Joinville, Brazil
- Date of death: 6 September 2019 (aged 78)
- Place of death: Joinville, Brazil
- Position: Forward

Youth career
- 1956: Glória FC

Senior career*
Years	Team	Apps	(Gls)
1957–1967	Caxias-SC		
1967	Bangu	7	(1)
1967–1973	Caxias-SC		
- * Club domestic league appearances and goals as of 25 March 2024

Norberto Hoppe (28 June 1941 – 6 September 2019) was a Brazilian professional footballer who played as a forward.

== Career ==
Revealed by Glória FC de Joinville, Norberto Hoppe began his career as a professional at Caxias FC, the club for which he played most of his career. He was top scorer in the state twice, being in 1966 the top scorer in a single edition with 33 goals. He caught the attention of Bangu, where he played in 1967, making 7 appearances and scoring a header against Flamengo. Missing the city of Joinville, he returned to Caxias where he worked until the end of 1973. After retiring from football, he became an accountant.

His name is currently on the medal awarded to the top scorers of the Campeonato Catarinense.

== Death ==
Norberto Hoppe died on 6 September 2019, victim of a heart disease.

== Honours ==
Individual

- 1960 Campeonato Catarinense top scorer: 9 goals
- 1966 Campeonato Catarinense top scorer: 33 goals
