= Fontan =

Fontan may refer to:

== Geography ==
- Fontan, Alpes-Maritimes - a village and commune in southern France

== Medicine ==
- Fontan procedure - an operation performed on the heart of those with some forms of congenital heart disease

== People ==
- Élodie Fontan – French actress
- Francis Fontan – French cardiothoracic surgeon who first performed the Fontan procedure
- François Fontan – French politician
- Osni Fontan – Brazilian footballer
- Victor Fontan – French cyclist
