= Serginho (footballer, born 1988) =

Brazilian footballer

Personal information
- Full name: Sérgio Paulo Nascimento Filho
- Date of birth: 27 April 1988 (age 38)
- Place of birth: Rio de Janeiro, Brazil
- Height: 1.83 m (6 ft 0 in)
- Position: Defensive midfielder

Team information
- Current team: Paysandu
- Number: 88

Senior career*
Years	Team	Apps	(Gls)
2007–2010	CFZ	0	(0)
2009	→ Atlético Tubarão (loan)	0	(0)
2009–2010	→ Santa Cruz (loan)	0	(0)
2010	Grêmio Barueri	1	(0)
2011	Paraná	33	(1)
2012–2014	Bragantino	70	(5)
2012	→ Ittihad Kalba (loan)	2	(0)
2014	Omonia	25	(1)
2015	Daegu FC	36	(4)
2016	Port	0	(0)
2016	Gangwon FC	17	(0)
2018	CRB	18	(0)
2019	Bangu	5	(0)
2019–2020	Petaling Jaya City	17	(4)
2020–	Paysandu	0	(0)
- * Club domestic league appearances and goals as of 19 February 2020

Sérgio Paulo Nascimento Filho known as Serginho (born 27 April 1988) is a footballer who currently plays for Paysandu. He claimed that he has dual citizen of Brazil and Syria.

== Biography ==
Sérgio Filho (literally Sérgio Jr. or Sérgio II), also known as Serginho (literally little Sérgio), started his career in CFZ. He signed his first professional contract in May 2007. In January 2009 he extended his contract to 31 December 2010 and left for Atlético Tubarão. In March, at the mid of 2009 Campeonato Catarinense, he returned to Rio de Janeiro and played in 2009 Taça Rio.

In October 2009 he left for Santa Cruz in 1-year loan, winning 2009 Copa Pernambuco. He scored twice in that cup.

In August 2010 he left for Grêmio Barueri (that season known as Grêmio Prudente)

On 3 January 2011 he left for Paraná Clube in 1-year contract, replacing departed (attacking) midfielder Serginho Catarinense as a member of starting XI.
