= Serginho Catarinense =

Brazilian footballer (born 1984)

Personal information
- Full name: Sérgio Roberto de Braga Filho
- Date of birth: 16 September 1984 (age 42)
- Place of birth: Joinville, Brazil
- Height: 1.77 m (5 ft 9 1/2 in)
- Position: Midfielder

Team information
- Current team: Joinville (head coach)

Senior career*
| Years | Team | Apps | (Gls) |
| 2004–2008 | Joinville | 121 | (2) |
| 2008 | → Juventus Jaraguá (loan) | | |
| 2009 | Marcílio Dias | | |
| 2009 | Juventus Jaraguá | | |
| 2010 | Operário Ferroviário | | |
| 2010 | Chapecoense | | |
| 2010 | Paraná | 12 | (0) |
| 2011 | Operário Ferroviário | 23 | (0) |
| 2011 | Alvorada | | |
| 2011 | → Novo Hamburgo (loan) | | |
| 2012 | Rio Branco-PR | 19 | (3) |
| 2012 | Arapongas | 8 | (1) |
| 2012 | Juventus Jaraguá | | |
| 2013 | Cerâmica | 15 | (1) |
| 2013–2014 | Brusque | 19 | (2) |
| 2014 | Camboriú | 19 | (4) |
| 2015 | São Bento | 15 | (0) |
| 2015 | Guarani | 8 | (0) |
| 2016 | São Bento | 7 | (0) |

Managerial career
- 2021: Blumenau (assistant)
- 2022–2024: Joinville U17
- 2025–2026: Joinville U20
- 2026: Joinville (interim)
- 2026–: Joinville
- * Club domestic league appearances and goals

Sérgio Roberto de Braga Filho (born 16 September 1984), known as Serginho Catarinense or just Serginho, is a Brazilian football coach and former player who played as a midfielder. He is the current head coach of Joinville.

== Biography ==
=== Santa Catarina clubs ===
Sérgio Filho (Filho means son, equivalent to Jr.) or Serginho started his career at Joinville Esporte Clube, which he signed a 4-year contract in January 2004. He appeared in 2004 Campeonato Brasileiro Série B as unused sub, and played twice at 2005 Campeonato Brasileiro Série C. In the next season, he played all 12 Série C matches for the club, which he also played the same number of games in 2007 season. He extended his contract for one more year in November 2007.

In June 2008 he left for Grêmio Esportivo Juventus until end of year, along with Joinville team-mate Tácio. He finished as the runner-up at Campeonato Catarinense Divisão Especial (Second Division) with team.

In December 2008 he left for Marcílio Dias until the end of 2009 Campeonato Catarinense. In June he re-joined Juventus., finished as the Campeonato Catarinense Divisão Especial runner-up again.

=== Paraná clubs ===
He left his native Santa Catarina state for the first time in January 2010, which he was signed by Operário Ferroviário Esporte Clube of Paraná, which he also known as Serginho Catarinense at that time and partnered with Sérgio Mendes Coimbra (aka Serginho Paulista) in the midfield. In May he returned to Santa Catarina for Chapecoense and in August signed by Paraná Clube after not included in Chapecoense's squad for 2010 Campeonato Brasileiro Série C. Chapecoense received some transfer fee as he had a few months left in his contract. Serginho played 12 games in 2010 Campeonato Brasileiro Série B for Paraná.

He returned to Operário in January 2011 along with Serginho Paulista. Paraná also signed another Serginho (also midfielder) that month.

In May he left for Sociedade Esportiva Alvorada Club in 1-year contract. He was loaned to Novo Hamburgo in August for 2011 Copa FGF.

== Honours ==
Joinville

- Campeonato Catarinense Série B: 2005, 2006, 2007
