= Osni Fontan =

Brazilian footballer

Fontan
Personal information
- Full name: Osni Fontan
- Date of birth: 17 February 1948 (age 78)
- Place of birth: Joinville, Brazil
- Position: Forward

Senior career*
Years	Team	Apps	(Gls)
1968–1975	Caxias-SC		
1976–1978	Joinville		

Managerial career
- 2016–2023: Joinville (coordinator)
- * Club domestic league appearances and goals as of 22 March 2024

Osni Fontan (born 17 February 1948), simply known as Fontan, is a Brazilian former professional footballer who played as a forward.

== Career ==
A striker, Fontan played for Caxias FC from 1968 to 1975 when, in 1976, he saw the club merge with América to give rise to Joinville EC. He was the first captain of the new club, first number 10, and the team's top scorer, becoming the first great idol in Joinville's history when he became two-time state champion. After retiring, he still worked at the club in various roles, being football coordinator from 2016 to 2023.

== Honours ==
Joinville

- Campeonato Catarinense: 1976, 1978

Individual

- 1976 Campeonato Catarinense top scorer: 14 goals
