= Rodrigo Rocha =

Brazilian footballer (born 1985)

Personal information
- Date of birth: 7 January 1985 (age 41)
- Place of birth: Brazil
- Height: 1.83 m (6 ft 0 in)
- Position: Goalkeeper

Senior career*
Years	Team	Apps	(Gls)
- Veranópolis
- Guarani de Palhoça
- Chapecoense(7v7)

International career
- Brazil(7v7)
- * Club domestic league appearances and goals

Rodrigo Rocha is a Brazilian goalkeeper who played for a Brazilian seven-a-side football club, Chapecoense, and the Brazil national seven-a-side team in tournaments organised or associated/affiliated with FIF7. He is best known for winning the FIF7 World Best Goalkeeper Award in 2017.
