= Beto Fuscão =

Brazilian footballer (1950–2022)

Personal information
- Birth name: Rigoberto Costa
- Date of birth: 13 April 1950
- Place of birth: Florianópolis, Santa Catarina, Brazil
- Date of death: 6 December 2022 (aged 72)
- Place of death: Florianópolis, Santa Catarina, Brazil
- Position: Defender

Senior career*
Years	Team	Apps	(Gls)
1968–1971	Figueirense		
1971–1972	América-SC		
1973–1977	Grêmio		
1977–1980	Palmeiras		
1981–1983	São José		
1984	Operário-MS		
1985	Araçatuba		
1986–1987	Uberaba		
1988	Tiradentes-DF		

International career
1976–1977	Brazil	8	(0)
- * Club domestic league appearances and goals

Beto Fuscão (born Rigoberto Costa; 13 April 1950 – 6 December 2022) was a Brazilian footballer who played as a defender.

== Life and career ==
Born in Florianópolis, Fuscão started his career as a Figueirense defender, and later went to play for Grêmio and Palmeiras, with whom he was vice-champion in the 1978 Campeonato Brasileiro Série A. In 1976 he was awarded a Bola de Prata (Silver Ball) for best defender, and the same year he received his first call from the Brazil national team, with whom he played several 1978 FIFA World Cup qualification games.

Fuscão died of stomach cancer on 6 December 2022, at the age of 72.
