= 2009 Campeonato Catarinense =

The 84th season of the Campeonato Catarinense began on January 17, 2009, and ended on May 3, 2009.

== Format ==
First stage

- Teams are divided into a groups of ten teams.
- One round-robin, in which all teams from one group play games against all teams within the group.

Second stage

- Teams are divided into a groups of ten teams.
- One round-robin, in which all teams from one group play games against all teams within the group.

Third stage

- The group stage with four teams: the top 2 teams of each stage (with one bonus point) and the top 2 teams of two stages.
- Two round-robin, in which all teams from one group play games against all teams within the group.

Four Stage:

- Home-and-away playoffs with the top 2 teams of third stage.

The winner of the four stage was crowned the champion. The champions and the runner up qualified to Copa do Brasil 2010 and the champions qualified to Campeonato Brasileiro Série D 2009. The tree teams with the worst positions were released to Divisão Especial 2010.

== Participating teams ==
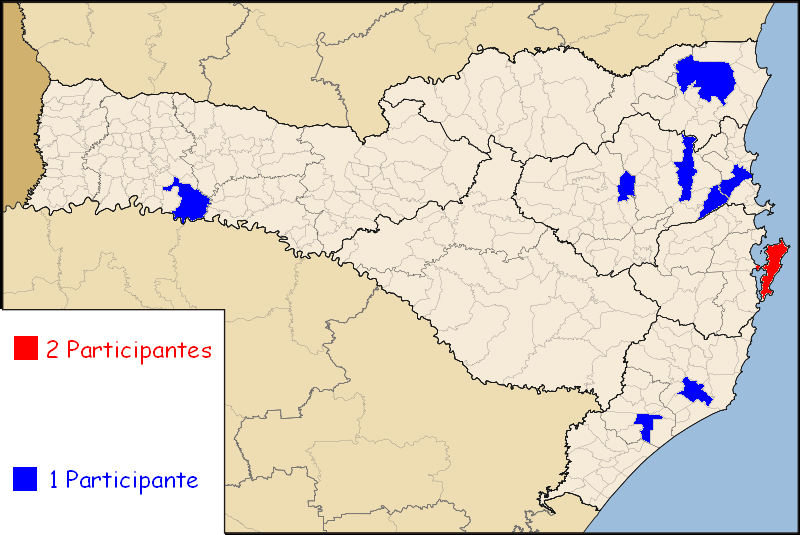
Campeonato Catarinense 2009 map

- Atlético de Ibirama - Ibirama
- Atlético Tubarão - Tubarão
- Avaí - Florianópolis
- Brusque - Brusque ¹
- Chapecoense - Chapecó
- Criciúma - Criciúma
- Figueirense - Florianópolis
- Joinville - Joinville
- Metropolitano - Blumenau
- Marcílio Dias - Itajaí

¹ Divisão Especial 2008 Champion

== First stage ==
Final standings
| Team | | Pts | G | W | D | L | GF | GA | GD |
|---|---|---|---|---|---|---|---|---|---|
| 1 | Criciúma | 19 | 9 | 6 | 1 | 2 | 24 | 16 | +8 |
| 2 | Atlético de Ibirama | 18 | 9 | 5 | 3 | 1 | 16 | 9 | +7 |
| 3 | Joinville | 16 | 9 | 5 | 1 | 3 | 16 | 9 | +7 |
| 4 | Brusque | 15 | 9 | 4 | 3 | 2 | 13 | 10 | +3 |
| 5 | Chapecoense | 13 | 9 | 4 | 1 | 4 | 19 | 16 | +3 |
| 6 | Avaí | 13 | 9 | 3 | 4 | 2 | 12 | 11 | +1 |
| 7 | Figueirense | 12 | 9 | 3 | 3 | 3 | 11 | 12 | -1 |
| 8 | Marcílio Dias | 10 | 9 | 3 | 1 | 3 | 9 | 13 | -4 |
| 9 | Atlético Tubarão | 4 | 9 | 1 | 1 | 7 | 8 | 24 | -16 |
| 10 | Metropolitano | 4 | 9 | 0 | 4 | 5 | 8 | 16 | -8 |
Pts – points earned; G – games played; W - wins; D - draws; L - losses; GF – goals for; GA – goals against; GD – goal differential

| Qualify to third stage, with one bonus point. |

== Second stage ==
Final standings
| Team | | Pts | G | W | D | L | GF | GA | GD |
|---|---|---|---|---|---|---|---|---|---|
| 1 | Avaí | 22 | 9 | 7 | 1 | 1 | 19 | 9 | +10 |
| 2 | Chapecoense | 20 | 9 | 6 | 2 | 1 | 20 | 8 | +12 |
| 3 | Metropolitano | 17 | 9 | 5 | 2 | 2 | 20 | 10 | +10 |
| 4 | Joinville | 17 | 9 | 5 | 1 | 3 | 19 | 12 | +7 |
| 5 | Figueirense | 15 | 9 | 4 | 3 | 2 | 16 | 15 | +1 |
| 6 | Atlético de Ibirama | 9 | 9 | 2 | 3 | 4 | 8 | 16 | -8 |
| 7 | Brusque | 10 | 9 | 2 | 4 | 3 | 14 | 15 | -1 |
| 8 | Marcílio Dias | 8 | 9 | 2 | 2 | 5 | 12 | 19 | -7 |
| 9 | Criciúma | 7 | 9 | 2 | 1 | 6 | 21 | 24 | -3 |
| 10 | Atlético Tubarão | 1 | 9 | 0 | 1 | 8 | 4 | 24 | -20 |
Pts – points earned; G – games played; W - wins; D - draws; L - losses; GF – goals for; GA – goals against; GD – goal differential

| Qualify to third stage, with one bonus point. |

== Confronts of two stages ==
| | AIB | ATU | AVA | BRU | CHA | CRI | FIG | JOI | MAD | MET |
|---|---|---|---|---|---|---|---|---|---|---|
| Atlético de Ibirama | — | 2x0 | 4x2 | 1x1 | 2x1 | 1x0 | 1x0 | 2x1 | 1x1 | 1x4 |
| Atlético Tubarão | 1x1 | — | 0x2 | 0x3 | 0x1 | 2x3 | 1x2 | 0x2 | 0x2 | 4x3 |
| Avaí | 3x1 | 0x0 | — | 2x2 | 1x0 | 4x0 | 1x1 | 0x0 | 3x1 | 2x0 |
| Brusque | 1x1 | 4x1 | 0x1 | — | 3x3 | 4x3 | 1x0 | 3x0 | 1x1 | 1x0 |
| Chapecoense | 2x0 | 5x2 | 5x1 | 4x1 | — | 3x0 | 2x2 | 1x0 | 4x2 | 0x0 |
| Criciúma | 2x1 | 4x1 | 4x2 | 1x1 | 5x2 | — | 4x1 | 2x3 | 6x1 | 2x2 |
| Figueirense | 1x1 | 4x0 | 1x1 | 0x0 | 3x2 | 5x4 | — | 2x4 | 2x1 | 2x1 |
| Joinville | 4x1 | 4x0 | 0x1 | 2x0 | 0x1 | 3x2 | 3x0 | — | 3x0 | 4x1 |
| Marcílio Dias | 0x2 | 3x0 | 0x2 | 2x0 | 0x2 | 2x0 | 0x1 | 4x1 | — | 0x3 |
| Metropolitano | 1x1 | 3x0 | 1x2 | 3x1 | 2x1 | 2x3 | 0x0 | 1x1 | 1x1 | — |

- First Stage Games
- Second Stage Games

== General Standings ==
Final standings
| Team | | Pts | G | W | D | L | GF | GA | GD |
|---|---|---|---|---|---|---|---|---|---|
| 1 | Avaí | 35 | 18 | 10 | 5 | 3 | 30 | 20 | +10 |
| 2 | Chapecoense | 33 | 18 | 10 | 3 | 5 | 39 | 24 | +15 |
| 3 | Joinville | 32 | 18 | 10 | 2 | 6 | 35 | 21 | +14 |
| 4 | Figueirense | 27 | 18 | 7 | 6 | 5 | 27 | 27 | 0 |
| 5 | Atlético de Ibirama | 27 | 18 | 7 | 6 | 5 | 24 | 25 | -1 |
| 6 | Criciúma | 26 | 18 | 8 | 2 | 8 | 45 | 40 | +5 |
| 7 | Brusque | 25 | 18 | 6 | 7 | 5 | 27 | 25 | +2 |
| 8 | Metropolitano | 21 | 18 | 5 | 6 | 7 | 28 | 26 | +2 |
| 9 | Marcílio Dias | 18 | 18 | 5 | 3 | 10 | 21 | 32 | -11 |
| 10 | Atlético Tubarão | 5 | 18 | 1 | 2 | 15 | 12 | 48 | -36 |
Pts – points earned; G – games played; W - wins; D - draws; L - losses; GF – goals for; GA – goals against; GD – goal differential

| Qualify to Third stage, because the team was champions of First or Second Stage |
| Qualify to Four Stage, because the teams had the best punctuation of two stages. |
| Release to Divisão Especial 2010. |

== Third Stage ==
Final standings
| Team | | Pts | G | W | D | L | GF | GA | GD | BP |
|---|---|---|---|---|---|---|---|---|---|---|
| 1 | Avaí | 11 | 6 | 3 | 1 | 2 | 9 | 7 | +2 | +1 |
| 2 | Chapecoense | 11 | 6 | 3 | 2 | 1 | 6 | 5 | +1 | 0 |
| 3 | Joinville | 10 | 6 | 3 | 1 | 2 | 8 | 7 | +1 | 0 |
| 4 | Criciúma | 3 | 6 | 0 | 2 | 4 | 6 | 10 | -4 | +1 |
Pts – points earned; G – games played; W - wins; D - draws; L - losses; GF – goals for; GA – goals against; GD – goal differential; BP - bonus point

== Confronts of Third Stage ==
| | AVA | CHA | CRI | JOI |
|---|---|---|---|---|
| Avaí | — | 0-1 | 2x1 | 3x1 |
| Chapecoense | 1x0 | — | 2x1 | 2x0 |
| Criciúma | 2x3 | 0x0 | — | 1-2 |
| Joinville | 1x0 | 3x0 | 2x1 | — |

- Turn Games
- Return Games

== Four Stage ==
Final standings
| Team | | Pts | G | W | D | L | AET |
|---|---|---|---|---|---|---|---|
| 1st | Avaí | 3 | 2 | 1 | 0 | 1 | 3 |
| 2nd | Chapecoense | 3 | 2 | 1 | 0 | 1 | 0 |
Pts – points earned; G – games played; W - wins; D - draws; L - losses; AET - Extra time goals

| Campeonato Catarinense 2009 Champions. |
| Qualify to Campeonato Brasileiro Série D 2009 |

| Champions | Runner up | Game 1 | Game 2* | Extra Time* |
|---|---|---|---|---|
| Avaí | Chapecoense | 1–3 | 3–1 | 3–0 |

* In Florianópolis, because the Avaí have better punctuation in the all stages.

== Champion ==
Campeonato Catarinense 2009:
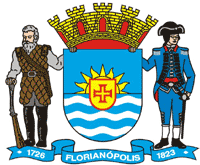
Avaí
14th Title
