= Ypiranga Futebol Clube (São Francisco do Sul) =

Brazilian football club based in Santa Catarina

Ypiranga
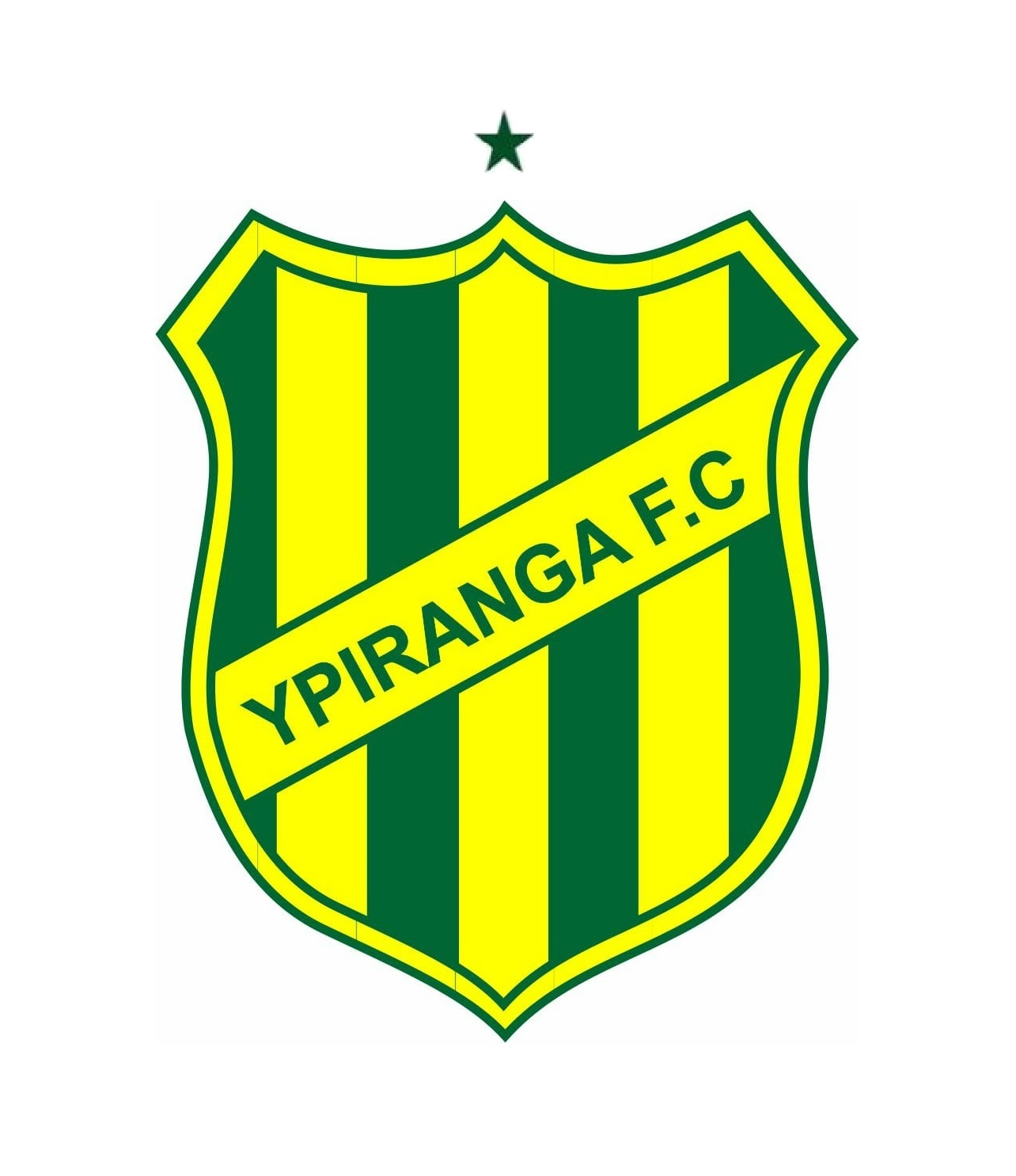
- Full name: Ypiranga Esporte Clube
- Nickname: Canarinho
- Founded: 29 July 1924; 101 years ago
- Stadium: Paulo Douat
- President: Oswaldo Obata Filho
- Website: www.instagram.com/ypirangasfs/

The Ypiranga Futebol Clube, formerly Ypiranga Foot-Ball Club and sometimes called Ypiranga de São Francisco do Sul is a Brazilian association football club from São Francisco do Sul, a city on the north coast of Santa Catarina.

Founded on July 29, 1924, Ypiranga, using the colors green and yellow, played in professional competitions until 1970 and won the Campeonato Catarinense in 1940, in addition to winning the state title, Ypiranga also had the top scorer in the Campeonato Catarinense 1940: Bujão, scorer of three goals, the same number as Saul, from Avaí. The team currently plays amateur football in competitions in the Amateur Adult categories promoted by the Liga Desportiva Francisquense where it is affiliated, Amateur Veteran in friendlies on Saturdays and Amateur Master (Cinquentão) in competitions promoted independently by the region.

== Honours ==
State
Competitions	Titles	Seasons
Campeonato Catarinense	1	1940

=== Others tournaments ===
==== State Regional ====
- Campeonato do Norte Catarinense (3): 1941, 1957, 1960

==== City ====
- Liga Joinvilense de Futebol (2): 1948, 1949
- Campeonato 1ª divisão – LFF (2): 1994, 2007
