= Genílson Alves =

Brazilian footballer

Genílson
Personal information
- Full name: Genílson Alves de Oliveira
- Date of birth: 25 February 1974 (age 52)
- Place of birth: João Pessoa, Brazil
- Height: 1.83 m (6 ft 0 in)
- Position: Forward

Senior career*
Years	Team	Apps	(Gls)
1997	Marcílio Dias		
1997	Joinville		
1998	ABC		
1998–1999	Figueirense		
2000	Málaga	3	(0)
2000	Santa Cruz		
2001	Portuguesa Santista		
2001	Figueirense		
2001	Comercial-SP		
2002	Rio Branco-SP		
2002	Coritiba		
2004	Figueirense		
2005	Fortaleza		
2005	Avaí		
2006	São Bento		
2007	Guaratinguetá		
2007	Londrina		
2008	América-SP		
2008	Marcílio Dias		
2010	Penapolense		
- * Club domestic league appearances and goals

Genílson Alves de Oliveira (born 25 February 1974), simply known as Genílson or Genílson Alves, is a Brazilian former professional footballer who played as a forward.

== Career ==
An idol of Figueirense where in 1999 he was top scorer in the state with an expressive mark of 26 goals, in addition to the decisive goal in the final against rival Avaí, Genílson played for several clubs during his career. In 2000 he played for Málaga in La Liga, but played in just three matches. In 2002 he suffered a serious injury to his Achilles tendon, which sidelined him. He scored a total of 53 goals in 107 matches for Figueirense.

== Honours ==
Figueirense

- Campeonato Catarinense: 1999

Individual

- 1999 Campeonato Catarinense top scorer: 26 goals
