= Saul Oliveira =

Brazilian footballer

Saul
Personal information
- Full name: Saul Oliveira
- Date of birth: 9 December 1919
- Place of birth: Florianópolis, Brazil
- Date of death: 10 July 1999 (aged 79)
- Place of death: Florianópolis, Brazil
- Position: Forward

Senior career*
Years	Team	Apps	(Gls)
1935	Bandeirante-SC		
1936	Íris-SC		
1937	Tamandaré		
1938–1941	Avaí		
1941	Cruzeiro-RS		
1942–1954	Avaí		

Managerial career
- 1960: Figueirense
- 1966: Avaí
- 1969: Avaí
- * Club domestic league appearances and goals as of 4 March 2024

Saul Oliveira (7 December 1919 – 10 July 1999), was a Brazilian professional footballer who played as a forward.

== Career ==
Considered Avaí FC's greatest idol of all time, he is also the top scorer in the club's history with 401 goals, as well as the top scorer in the Clássico de Florianópolis. He was state champion with the club four times, being top scorer three times. He was also president of Avaí from 1966 to 1968, as well as a coach.

== Honours ==
Avaí

- Campeonato Catarinense: 1942, 1943, 1944, 1945

Individual

- Campeonato Catarinense top scorer: 1940, 1942, 1943, 1945
