= Soares (footballer, born 1963) =

Brazilian footballer

Personal information
- Full name: José Carlos Soares
- Date of birth: 16 April 1963
- Place of birth: Morro Agudo, Brazil
- Date of death: 15 April 2018 (aged 54)
- Place of death: Fernandópolis, Brazil
- Height: 1.83 m (6 ft 0 in)
- Position: Forward

Youth career
- AA Orlândia

Senior career*
Years	Team	Apps	(Gls)
1979–1980	AA Orlândia		
1981–1984	Londrina		
1983	→ Quilmes (loan)		
1985–1986	Fernandópolis		
1986–1988	Comercial-MS		
1987	→ Bahia (loan)		
1988	→ Santos (loan)		
1988–1989	Mogi Mirim		
1989–1993	Criciúma		
1993	→ Palmeiras (loan)		
1994–1995	Al-Ettifaq		
1995–1996	Gaziantepspor		
1996	Taquaritinga		
- * Club domestic league appearances and goals as of 27 February 2024

José Carlos Soares (16 April 1963 – 15 April 2018), simply known as Soares, was a Brazilian professional footballer who played as a forward.

== Career ==
Revealed by AA Orlândia, Soares was part of the 1981 state champion squad for Londrina EC. In 1983 he was loaned to Quilmes AC in Argentina, and in 1985 he played for Fernandópolis FC, where he stood out as the club's top scorer. In 1987 he was champion for Comercial-MS, and was loaned to compete in the Campeonato Brasileiro Série A for Bahia in 1987, and Santos in 1988. He later played for Mogi Mirim, and in 1989 he arrived at Criciúma EC, a team where he became an idol, being part of the winning the 1991 Copa do Brasil in addition to 4 state titles, being top scorer in 1990 with 14 goals. He was loaned to Palmeiras in 1993, and was state champion with the club. He also played for Al-Ettifaq, Gazientepspor and Taquaritinga.

== Honours ==
Londrina

- Campeonato Paranaense: 1981

Comercial-MS

- Campeonato Sul-Mato-Grossense: 1987

Criciúma

- Copa do Brasil: 1991
- Campeonato Catarinense: 1989, 1990, 1991, 1993

Palmeiras

- Campeonato Paulista: 1993

Individual

- 1990 Campeonato Catarinense top scorer: 14 goals

== Death ==
Soares died of a heart attack the day before his 55th birthday, in Fernandópolis, São Paulo.
