= Grêmio Esportivo Olímpico =

Olímpico
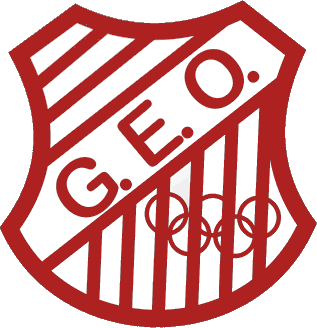
- Full name: Grêmio Esportivo Olímpico
- Nickname: GEO
- Founded: August 14, 1919
- Dissolved: 1970s
- Ground: Estádio da Alameda Rio Branco, Blumenau, Santa Catarina state, Brazil
- Capacity: 3,500
| Home colors | Away colors |

Grêmio Esportivo Olímpico, commonly known as Olímpico, was a Brazilian football club based in Blumenau, Santa Catarina state. They won the Campeonato Catarinense twice.

== History ==
The club was founded on August 14, 1919, as Sociedade Desportiva Blumenauense. The club was renamed to Grêmio Esportivo Olímpico in 1949. They won the Campeonato Catarinense in 1949 and in 1964. The club closed its football department in 1971.

In 1980, when Blumenau's Palmeiras, founded in 1919 as Brasil and until then four times runner-up in the state championship, in attempt to broaden its appeal in the community renamed itself to Blumenau Esporte Clube it integrated the dark red (grena) colour of Olímpico in its new insignia.

== Stadium ==
Grêmio Esportivo Olímpico played their home games at Estádio da Alameda Rio Branco, the field still exists today, but without the stands.

== Honours ==
=== Official tournaments ===
State
| Competitions | Titles | Seasons |
|---|---|---|
| Campeonato Catarinense | 2 | 1949, 1964 |

=== Others tournaments ===
==== City ====
- Campeonato Blumenauense (4): 1943, 1949, 1951, 1961
- Torneio Início de Blumenau (2): 1943, 1960
- Torneio do Encerramento (1): 1943

=== Runners-up ===
- Campeonato Catarinense (1): 1970
