= Luiz Carlos (footballer, born 1988) =

Brazilian footballer

Personal information
- Full name: Luiz Carlos Oliveira de Bitencourt
- Date of birth: 24 May 1988 (age 38)
- Place of birth: Porto Alegre, Brazil
- Height: 1.91 m (6 ft 3 in)
- Position: Goalkeeper

Youth career
- 2003–2011: Internacional

Senior career*
| Years | Team | Apps | (Gls) |
| 2007–2011 | Internacional | 0 | (0) |
| 2009 | → Brasil de Pelotas (loan) | 6 | (0) |
| 2010 | → Monte Azul (loan) | 12 | (0) |
| 2011–2012 | → União Leiria (loan) | 2 | (0) |
| 2013–2014 | → São José-RS (loan) | 15 | (0) |
| 2014 | → Juventude (loan) | 7 | (0) |
| 2015–2016 | → Sport Recife (loan) | 0 | (0) |
| 2017 | Clube Atlético Tubarão | 11 | (0) |
| 2018–2019 | Náutico | 3 | (0) |
| 2020–2021 | Fast Clube | 0 | (0) |
| 2021 | Santa Cruz-RS | | |
| 2022 | São Luiz | 0 | (0) |
- * Club domestic league appearances and goals as of 12 March 2022

Luiz Carlos Oliveira de Bitencourt (born 24 May 1988) is a Brazilian footballer who plays as a goalkeeper.
