= Ademir Patrício =

Brazilian footballer

Personal information
- Full name: Ademir Silveira Patrício
- Date of birth: 14 August 1955 (age 71)
- Place of birth: Criciúma, Brazil
- Position: Forward

Youth career
- Próspera

Senior career*
Years	Team	Apps	(Gls)
1973	Próspera		
1974	Hercílio Luz		
1975–1976	Inter de Lages		
1977	Atlético Paranaense		
1977–1979	Criciúma		
1980	Figueirense		
1980	Ponte Preta		
1980–1983	Ceará		
1983	Vitória		
1984–1985	Bahia		
1985	ABC		
1986	Avaí		
1986	Ubiratan		
1986–1987	Ferroviária		
1987	Cruzeiro		
1988	Passo Fundo		
1988–1989	Fortaleza		
1989	Remo		
1990	Ferroviário		
1990	Tiradentes-CE		
1991	Potiguar de Mossoró		
1991	Ferroviário		
1992	Capela-AL		
1993–1994	4 de Julho		
1995	Nacional-AM		
- * Club domestic league appearances and goals as of 28 February 2024

Ademir Silveira Patrício (born 14 August 1955), simply known as Ademir Patrício, is a Brazilian former professional footballer who played as a forward.

== Career ==
A thrashed center forward, Ademir Patrício started his career at EC Próspera, in Criciúma. He played for several other teams until arriving at another club in the city, Comerciário, where he was top scorer in the state in 1977, repeating the feat in 1978, this time with the club now under its current name, Criciúma EC.

He was two-time state champion and top scorer for Ceará, champion for Bahia in 1984, Cruzeiro in 1987, Remo in 1989, 4 de Julho in 1993 and Nacional in 1995, his last professional club.

== Honours ==
Ceará

- Campeonato Cearense: 1980, 1981

Bahia

- Campeonato Baiano: 1984

Cruzeiro

- Campeonato Mineiro: 1987

Remo

- Campeonato Paraense: 1989

4 de Julho

- Campeonato Piauiense: 1993

Nacional-AM

- Campeonato Amazonense: 1995

Individual

- 1977 Campeonato Catarinense top scorer: 27 goals
- 1978 Campeonato Catarinense top scorer: 19 goals
- 1982 Campeonato Cearense top scorer: 31 goals
- 1993 Campeonato Piauiense top scorer: 15 goals
- Troféu Rui Lima – Campeonato Piauiense best player: 1993
