= Esporte Clube Operário de Mafra =

Clube Atlético Operário
- Full name: Clube Atlético Operário
- Nickname(s): Glorioso; Alvinegro do Planalto Norte; Alvinegro Catarinense
- Founded: December 8, 1940
- Ground: Estádio Alfredo Herbst, Mafra, Santa Catarina state, Brazil
- Capacity: 3,000
Home colours	Away colours

Clube Atletico Operário, commonly former EC Operário de Mafra, is a Brazilian football club based in Mafra, Santa Catarina state. The club was formerly known as Sociedade Esportiva e Recreativa Operários Mafrenses and Clube Atlético Operário.

== History ==
The club was founded on May 12, 1897, is Clube Atlético Operário, in the 1990s it was renamed to Sociedade Esportiva e Recreativa Operários Mafrenses, but the club's logo still depicts the acronym CAO, meaning Clube Atlético Operário. They won the Campeonato Catarinense Third Level in 1913, 1947, 1996.

== Honours ==
=== Official tournaments ===
State
Competitions	Titles	Seasons
Campeonato Catarinense	1	1956

=== Others tournaments ===
==== State Regional ====
- Campeonato Regional da Zona Norte - LEC (4): 1947, 1948, 1956, 1962

==== City ====
- Campeonato Municipal (14): 1947, 1948, 1949, 1954, 1956, 1958, 1959, 1962, 1970, 1973, 1986, 1989, 1996, 2002

== Stadium ==
Clube Atlético Operário play their home games at Estádio Alfredo Herbst. The stadium has a maximum capacity of 3,000 people.
