= Caxias Futebol Clube =

Brazilian football club

Caxias
- Full name: Caxias Futebol Clube
- Nicknames: Gualicho; Alvinegro
- Founded: October 12, 1920 (105 years ago)
- Ground: Ernestão, Joinville (SC)
- Capacity: 5,000
- Website: http://www.caxiasfc.com.br/
Home colours	Away colours

Caxias Futebol Clube is a Brazilian football club based in Joinville, with a population of more than half a million the largest city of the south Brazilian state of Santa Catarina. The club, founded on October 12, 1920, won in the years 1929, 1954 and 1955 the state championship of Santa Catarina, the Campeonato Catarinense. On the national level the club – nicknamed "Gualicho" after a successful race horse of the early 1950s – took part in the cup competition, the Copa do Brasil of 2000, where it was eliminated in the first round. In 1976 a merger of the football operations with the traditional rivals América FC gave birth to the Joinville Esporte Clube, which since has won more than ten state championships.

In 1996 Caxias returned to football under its own name and was runner-up of the state championship of 2003. After 2011 the club suspended activities due to financial issues.

== History ==
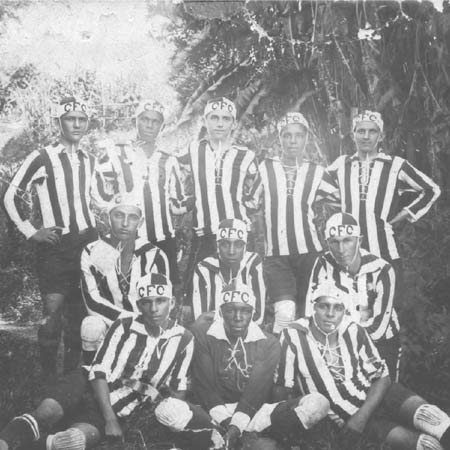
The winning team of the State Championship 1929

The club was formed six years after the foundation of local rivals América FC through a merger of the local sides Vampiro, from which stems the colour black, and Teutônia, which gave origin to the colour white in the club's insignia. The club was named in honour of Luís Alves de Lima e Silva, Duke of Caxias, a military leader of imperial Brazil.

In 1921 Caxias won its first match against América with 2–1. Between 1923 and 1928 Caxias was consecutively three times runner-up in the city championship behind América, a tournament it won eventually in 1929 when it progressed to win its first state championship through a 7–3 win over Adolpho Konder FC on their ground in the state capital Florianópolis. In 1931 the club was runner-up in the state championship behind Lauro Müller FC of Itajaí after it failed to turn up for the final.

In 1933 the club inaugurated its own stadium which it built on terrain bought on favourable conditions from Ernesto Schlemm Sobrinho with a 3–1 win over Coritiba FC from the state capital of neighbouring Paraná. The club managed to pay off the stadium, today known casually as Ernestão, by 1947.

Throughout the 1930s until the late 1940s the club remained the leading force in Joinville and was runner-up on state level in the years 1937, 1941 and 1945. After four state championships of local rivals América between 1947 and 1952 Caxias achieved itself two more state titles, in 1954 prevailing impressively 7–0 over EC Ferroviário from Tubarão in the decisive match, and undefeated in 1955, winning 2–0 after two draws against Palmeiras EC of Blumenau. Caxias shone once more when it was runner-up in the state championship of 1959 behind Paula Ramos EC from Florianópolis and in 1968 when it came second after a 1–2 loss in the decisive match to Comerciário EC, which in a later incarnation became known as today's Criciúma EC.

In 1976 a merger of the football operations of Caxias and América, which by then had won in 1971 a fifth state title, led to the foundation of the Joinville Esporte Clube under the leadership of a local entrepreneur, which since has won more than ten state championships, including a record eight consecutive titles in its early phase from 1978 to 1985. Both, Caxias and América were under great financial duress in that period, the problems of Caxias mainly deriving from an expensive renovation of the Ernesto Schlemm Sobrinho stadium, which was ceded to the new club to use.

The club as such remained in existence and retained for its own use two rooms in the stadium. By 1996, a few years after the old rivals América, Caxias returned on the scene and fielded a team in the amateur divisions and won the title of Joinville. In 2001 the stadium use arrangements with Joinville EC ended and the Ernestão returned to Caxias, which used the occasion to return to professional football entering into the second state division. From 2002 to 2006 Caxias played once more in the highest state league with the second place of 2003 in a tight contest behind Figueirense FC from the capital as a new highlight. This led to admittance to the 2004 Copa do Brasil, where the club in its sole participation in a national competition exited in the first round with a 1–3 home defeat against Fluminense FC from Rio de Janeiro.

After 2011 the club withdrew again from professional football owing to financial difficulties. In 2014 Caxias was attempting to sell, at least partially, their stadium property, valued at about R$10.5million in order to be able to retire its debt of about R$2million.

== Notable players ==
The goalkeeper Jairo do Nascimento "Pantera", who started his career in 1965 with Caxias and played later for Fluminense FC, Coritiba FC and SC Corinthians Paulista is with his single match for the Seleção in 1976 considered the only native of Joinville to ever play for Brazil. Adalberto Kretzer "Mickey", who started with the club in 1966 went on to have a rich career with Fluminense FC, EC Bahia, São Paulo FC and clubs in Colombia. Osni Fontan was a star of the team in the 1970s and later of Joinville EC. Afterwards he became president of Caxias and a well regarded sports commentator.

Several players of Caxias achieved the honour of becoming top-scorers of the state championship. Outstanding thereof is Norberto Hoppe. His total from 1966 of 33 goals is still record ahead of the 28 goals scored by Juti of Avaí FC 1975. He was also the top scorer over all in Brazil of 1966. After playing in Rio de Janeiro for Bangu AC in 1967 he insisted on returning to Joinville the year after.

Top-scorers of Caxias in the first state division

- 1929: Raul (3 goals)
- 1931: Cylo
- 1937: Raul and Otto
- 1941: Nhonhô (6)
- 1954: Juarez (18)
- 1955: Didi (6)
- 1966: Norberto Hoppe (33)
- 2004: Vicente

== Honours ==
=== Official tournaments ===
State
Competitions	Titles	Seasons
Campeonato Catarinense	3	1929, 1954, 1955
Campeonato Catarinense Série B	1	2002
Campeonato Catarinense Série C	1	2010

=== Others tournaments ===
==== State ====
- Torneio Início do Campeonato Catarinense (1): 1956

==== City ====
- Liga Joinvilense de Futebol (12): 1935, 1937, 1938, 1939, 1940, 1941, 1944, 1945, 1946, 1954, 1955, 1996

=== Runners-up ===
- Campeonato Catarinense (7): 1931, 1937, 1941, 1945, 1959, 1968, 2003
- Campeonato Catarinense Série B (1): 2001
