= Serginho Paulista (footballer, born 1988) =

Brazilian footballer (born 1988)

Personal information
- Full name: Sérgio Mendes Coimbra
- Date of birth: 13 March 1988 (age 38)
- Place of birth: São Paulo, Brazil
- Height: 1.76 m (5 ft 9 in)
- Position: Defensive midfielder

Team information
- Current team: Balaton Bútor FC Veszprém

Youth career
- 2005–2006: São Paulo

Senior career*
Years	Team	Apps	(Gls)
2007–2009	São Paulo		
2008	→ Marília (loan)		
2009	→ Toledo (loan)		
2010	Operário Ferroviário		
2010	Marília		
2011	Operário Ferroviário		
2011–2013	Londrina		
2014–2015	Maringa		
2015	Foz do Iguaçu		
2015	Juazeirense		
2016	Camboriú		
2016–	Operário Ferroviário		
- * Club domestic league appearances and goals

Sérgio Mendes Coimbra known as Serginho Paulista (little Sérgio of São Paulo) (born 13 March 1988) is a Brazilian footballer who plays for Operário Ferroviário.

== Biography ==
Born in São Paulo state, Serginho started his career at São Paulo FC. He scored once for the team at 2007 São Paulo state championship.

He made his Campeonato Brasileiro Série A debut in a 1–2 away defeat to Atlético Paranaense on 2 December 2007. Replaced Leandro in the 46th minute and played the entire 2nd half of the match.

He then spent a season on loan to Marília, for 2008 state league and 2008 Campeonato Brasileiro Série B. He also signed a new 2-year contract with São Paulo in January 2008.

He left for Toledo Colônia Work in next year, in 4-month loan. After his contract with São Paulo expired, he left for Operário Ferroviário and also known as Serginho Paulista to disambiguate with Serginho Catarinense.

he was re-signed by Marília in July 2010.

In the next season, Marília signed left back Serginho Pernambucano and another Serginho Paulista (right back) and Sérgio Mendes Coimbra himself was released. He returned to Paraná state and played 8 times in 2011 Campeonato Brasileiro Série D. He also played along with namesake Serginho Catarinense in the first 6 months. He was known as Paulista in the fourth division.

== Honours ==
São Paulo

- Campeonato Brasileiro Série A: 2007

Operário Ferroviário

- Campeonato Brasileiro Série D: 2017
- Campeonato Brasileiro Série C: 2018
