= Lauro Müller Futebol Clube =

Lauro Müller
- Full name: Lauro Müller Futebol Clube
- Nickname(s): Alvinegro
- Founded: March 24, 1929
- Dissolved: March 7, 1951
- Ground: Estádio Aníbal Torres Costa, Itajaí, Santa Catarina state, Brazil
- Capacity: 15,000
Home colours	Away colours

Lauro Müller Futebol Clube, commonly known as Lauro Müller, was a Brazilian football club based in Itajaí, Santa Catarina state. They won the Campeonato Catarinense once.

== History ==
The club was founded on July 23, 1924. Lauro Müller won the Campeonato Catarinense in 1931. The club's football department was incorporated to Clube Náutico Almirante Barroso's football department on March 7, 1951.

== Honours ==
=== Official tournaments ===
State
Competitions	Titles	Seasons
Campeonato Catarinense	1	1931

=== Others tournaments ===
==== City ====
- Campeonato Municipal (LID) (2): 1954, 1958

== Stadium ==
Lauro Müller Futebol Clube played their home games at Estádio Aníbal Torres Costa. The stadium had a maximum capacity of 15,000 people.
