= Minduri =

- Municipality
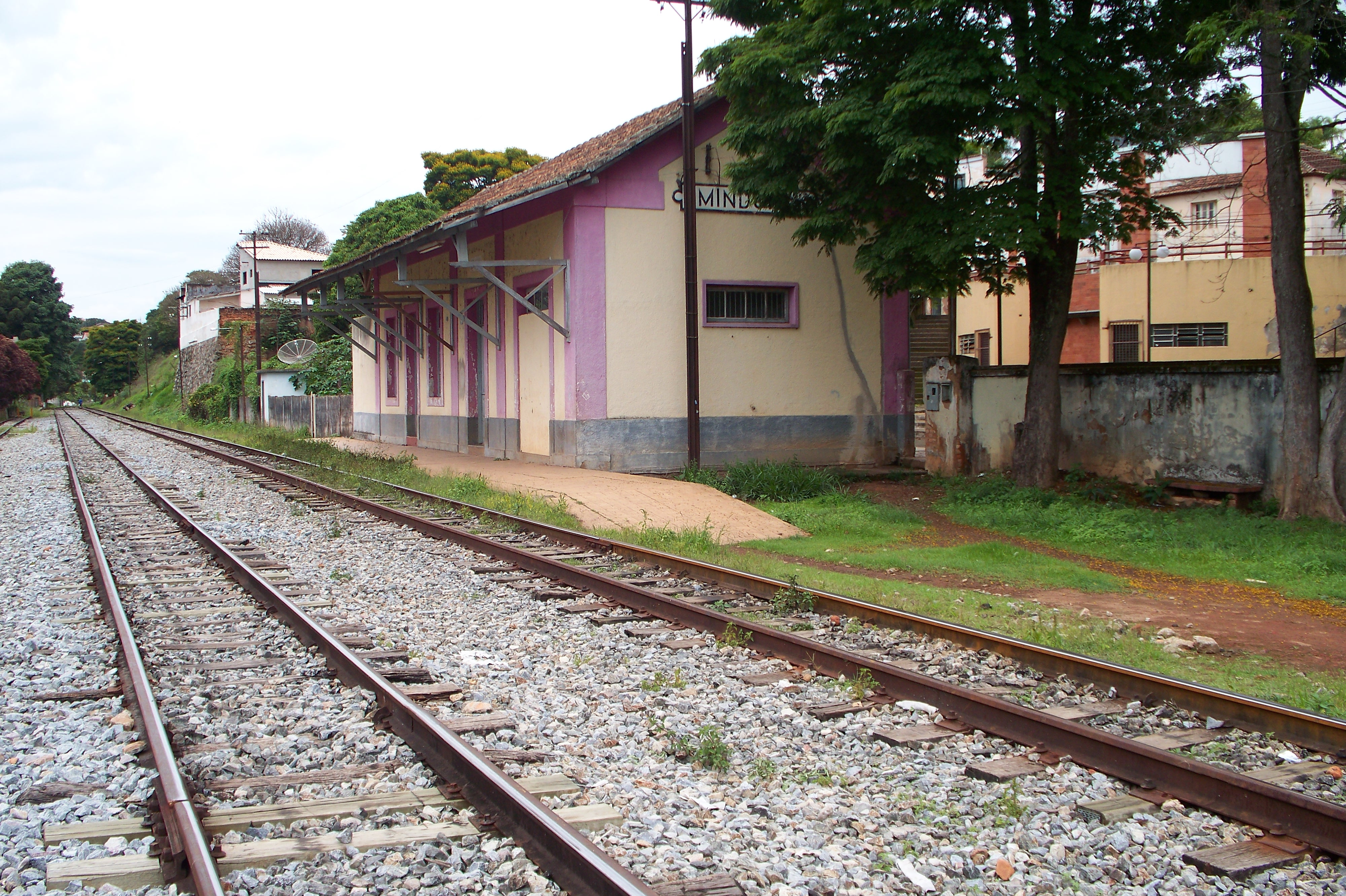

- Flag Coat of arms

- Location in Brazil
- Coordinates: 21°40′55″S 44°36′14″W
- Country: Brazil
- Region: Southeast
- State: Minas Gerais
- Mesoregion: Sudoeste de Minas

Population (2020)
  - Total: 3,893
- Time zone: UTC−3 (BRT)

Minduri is a municipality in the state of Minas Gerais in the Southeast region of Brazil.

== Geography ==
According to IBGE (2017), the municipality is in the Immediate Geographic Region of Caxambu-Baependi, in the Intermediate Geographic Region of Pouso Alegre.

=== Ecclesiastical circumscription ===
The municipality is part of the Roman Catholic Diocese of São João del-Rei.

== See also ==
- List of municipalities in Minas Gerais
