= Paula Ramos Esporte Clube =

Paula Ramos
- Full name: Paula Ramos Esporte Clube
- Nicknames: PREC; Tricolor da Ilha
- Founded: 15 December 1937
- Ground: Estádio Trindade, Florianópolis, Santa Catarina state, Brazil
- Capacity: 5,000
- Website: paularamos.com.br
| Home colours | Away colours |

Paula Ramos Esporte Clube, is a sports club based in Florianópolis, the capital of the south Brazilian state of Santa Catarina, founded on 15 December 1937. The football team of the club played its home matches at the Estádio Trindade which had a maximum capacity of 5,000 people.

The football team of Paula Ramos won between 1947 and 1964 six times the city championship of Florianópolis. Highlight was the victory in the State Championship of Santa Catarina, the Campeonato Catarinense, in 1959. In later years the club abandoned professional sports.

== Honours ==
=== Official tournaments ===
State
| Competitions | Titles | Seasons |
|---|---|---|
| Campeonato Catarinense | 1 | 1959 |

=== Others tournaments ===
==== City ====
- Campeonato Citadino de Florianópolis (6): 1947, 1948, 1956, 1961, 1962, 1964
- Torneio Início de Florianópolis (2): 1954, 1956

=== Runners-up ===
- Campeonato Catarinense (1): 1948
