= Serginho Paulista (footballer, born 1980) =

Brazilian footballer (born 1980)

Personal information
- Full name: Sérgio Rodrigo Penteado Dias
- Date of birth: 25 September 1980 (age 46)
- Place of birth: Campinas, Brazil
- Height: 1.73 m (5 ft 8 in)
- Position: Right back

Team information
- Current team: Volta Redonda

Senior career*
Years	Team	Apps	(Gls)
	Amparo (SP)	0	(0)
	Santa Ritense	0	(0)
	Ferroviária	0	(0)
	Rio Branco (SP)	0	(0)
2005	Olímpia (SP)	0	(0)
2005	Independente (SP)	0	(0)
2006	CRB	0	(0)
2006	Independente (SP)	0	(0)
2007	SEV Hortolândia	0	(0)
2007	→ Sport Recife (loan)	0	(0)
2008	Náutico	0	(0)
2008	ABC	4	(0)
2009	União Barbarense	0	(0)
2009	Campinas	0	(0)
2010	Ituano	0	(0)
2011	Marília	0	(0)
2011	Volta Redonda	0	(0)
Total		4	(0)
- * Club domestic league appearances and goals

Sérgio Rodrigo Penteado Dias known as Serginho Paulista (born 25 September 1980), is a Brazilian footballer who (as of April 2011) plays for Volta Redonda as a right back.

== Biography ==
Born in Campinas, São Paulo state, Serginho spent most of his career in Brazilian state leagues, especially inside São Paulo state.

In December 2004 he was signed by Olímpia (SP), and in August same year transferred to Independente de Limeira for 2005 Copa Paulista.

In January 2006 he signed a 1-year deal with Alagoas side CRB, but in February returned to Independente, signed until the end of 2006 Campeonato Paulista Série A3.

In December 2006 he signed a 1-year contract with Social Esportiva Vitória of Hortolândia. The team finished 17th in 2007 Campeonato Paulista Série A3.

On 1 June 2007 he extended his contract with SEV to December 2008, and left for Sport Recife of 2007 Campeonato Brasileiro Série A on 4 June.

In the next season he left for Náutico and played 4 games in 2008 Copa do Brasil. He was released again in June without any appearance in 2008 Campeonato Brasileiro Série A; He joined ABC in June but released in August.

He was signed by União Barbarense in January 2009, but left the club after the end of 2009 Campeonato Paulista Série A3. He joined Campinas until the end of 2009 Copa Paulista. In December 2009 he was signed by Campeonato Paulista club Ituano.

He left for Marília in December 2010. At that time Marília released another Serginho Paulista (Sérgio Mendes Coimbra) and signed left back Serginho, thus Sérgio Rodrigo Penteado Dias became Serginho Paulista and the left back became Serginho Pernambucano, using the demonym as disambiguation. However he left the club in February and signed by Volta Redonda until the end of 2011 Campeonato Carioca.
