= Serginho (footballer, born 1978) =

Brazilian footballer (born 1978)

Personal information
- Full name: Sérgio Severino da Silva
- Date of birth: 27 September 1978 (age 48)
- Place of birth: Recife, Brazil
- Height: 1.67 m (5 ft 6 in)
- Position: Left back

Senior career*
Years	Team	Apps	(Gls)
- ?
2005	Ypiranga (PE)	0	(0)
2005	Vera Cruz (PE)	0	(0)
2005	Vitória (PE)	3+	(0)
2006–2007	Sport Recife	9	(0)
2007	Central (PE)	3	(0)
2007	Salgueiro	0	(0)
2007	Sport Recife	1	(0)
2008	ASA	0	(0)
2008–2010	Confiança	23	(0)
2010	Salgueiro	10	(0)
2011	Marília	0	(0)
2011	Campinense	0	(0)
- * Club domestic league appearances and goals

Sérgio Severino da Silva known as Serginho (little Sérgio) (born 27 September 1978), is a Brazilian former footballer.

Serginho spent most of his career in native Pernambuco and nearby Northeast states. He played a few seasons in Campeonato Brasileiro Série C and was a substitute player of Sport Recife in Série A and Série B.

== Biography ==
Born in Recife, capital of Pernambuco state, he played for Campeonato Pernambucano side Ypiranga in 2005. He then left for Vera Cruz of Vitória de Santo Antão in April. In July he left for city rival Vitória of Série C. He did not play the last 2 matches of the group stage as the team certainly disqualified for the next round.

In December 2005 he left for Sport Recife in 1-year contract, finished as the runner-up of 2006 Campeonato Brasileiro Série B. He left the club in July 2007, for Central de Caruaru of Série C. After the team eliminated in the first stage, he joined Salgueiro in August, winning 2007 Campeonato Pernambucano Second Division. He returned to Sport Recife in late 2007 and played the last round of 2007 Campeonato Brasileiro Série A.

In January 2008 he left for ASA until the end of 2008 Campeonato Alagoano. In June he left for Sergipe side Confiança. He was the regular starter in the first 2 stages of 2008 Campeonato Brasileiro Série C, played 16 out of 18 matches. But after substituted in the first half of the fourth game of the final stage (total 14 games), he never played again. Confiança finished seventh that season. He signed a 1-year extension in December 2008. He played 3 times in 2009 Série C. He extended his contract again in December 2009.

In June he returned to Salgueiro and played 10 games in 2010 Campeonato Brasileiro Série C, as losing semi-finalists.

In December 2010 he was signed by Marília until the end of 2011 Campeonato Paulista Série A2. As the team had another Serginho, Sérgio Severino da Silva was known as Serginho Pernambucano that season.

On 14 March 2011 he was signed by Paraíba side Campinense until the end of 2011 Campeonato Brasileiro Série C.

== Honours ==
- Campeonato Pernambucano: 2006, 2007
- Campeonato Sergipano: 2009
- Campeonato Pernambucano Second Division: 2007
