= Blumenau Esporte Clube =

Blumenau
- Full name: Blumenau Esporte Clube
- Nicknames: BEC; Tricolor
- Founded: 19 July 1919; 107 years ago
- Ground: Estádio Monumental do Sesi, Blumenau (SC)
- Capacity: 6,000
- President: Caio Roberto
- Head Coach: Leandro Mehlich
- League: Campeonato Brasileiro Série D Campeonato Catarinense Série B
- 2025: Catarinense Série B, 3rd of 9
- Website: becnet.com.br
Home colors	Away colors	Third colors

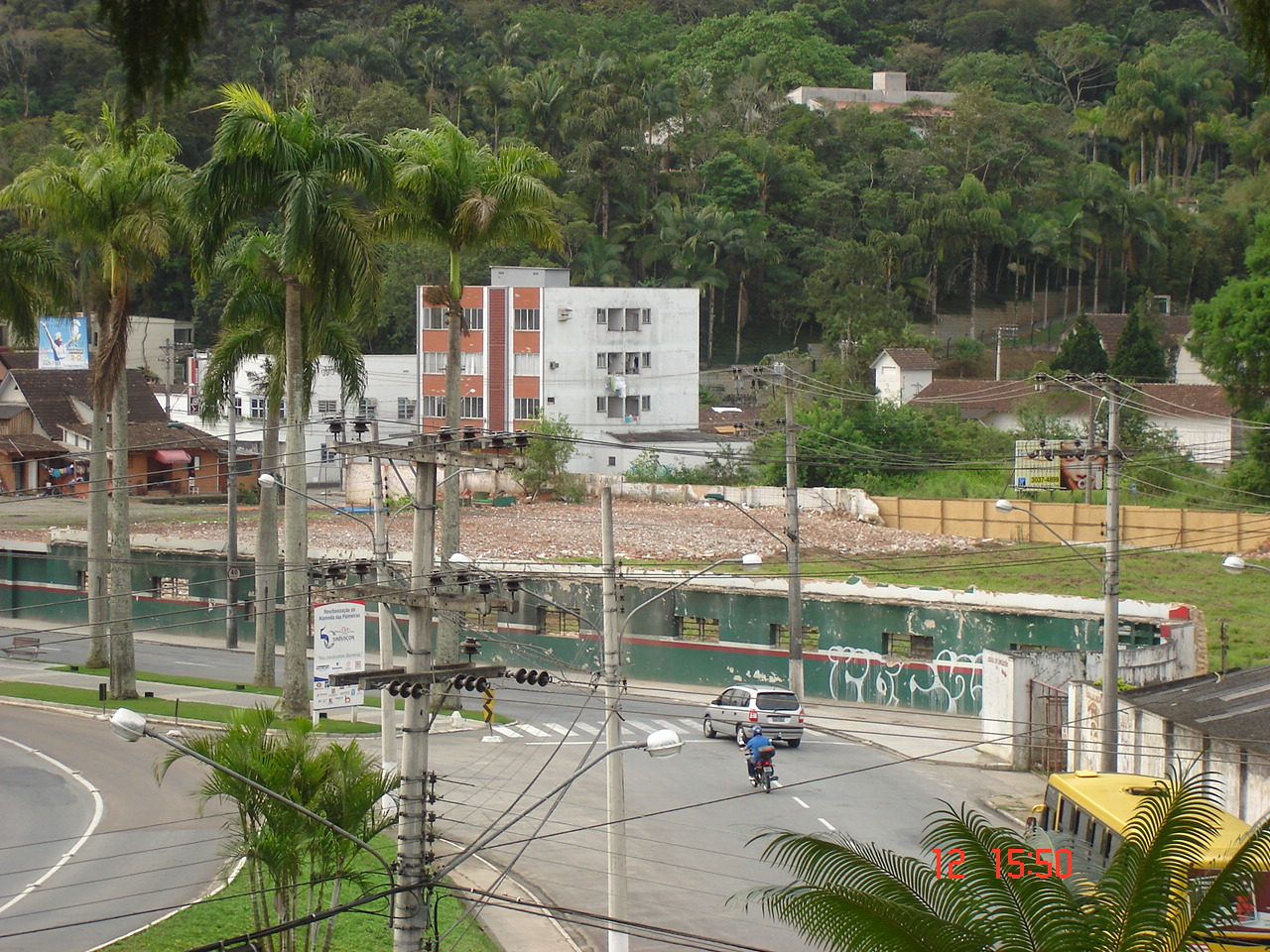
Ruins of the club's historic stadium, Estádio Aderbal Ramos da Silva, known as Deba, demolished 2007

Blumenau Esporte Clube is a football club from the city of Blumenau in the south Brazilian state of Santa Catarina.

== History ==
The club was founded on 19 July 1919 as Brasil Football Club. In 1936 the club was renamed to Recreativo Brasil Esporte Clube, and in 1944, owing to a law prohibiting national denominations in club names, to Palmeiras Esporte Clube.

On 19 July 1980 the club was renamed to Blumenau Esporte Clube in order to widen its appeal in the community. The colour red was integrated into the club's insignia in consideration of the club Grêmio Esportivo Olímpico - founded in 1920 and winner of the state championship of Santa Catarina, the Campeonato Catarinense, of 1949 and 1964 - which ceased its football operations in 1971.

The club was between 1927 and 1988 six times runner-up in the state championships. In 1989 Blumenau, frequently referred to as "BEC", participated in the Copa do Brasil, where it was eliminated in the second round. In 1989 and 1991 the club participated in the national second division, the Série B and in 1988, 1992, 1994, 1997 and 1998 in the third division, Série C. Relegation in the state championship 1998 aggravated financial problems and led after an initial withdrawal from competition to bankruptcy.

After a resurrection in 2003 the club took part in a lower level of the state championship and got close to promotion. Renewed financial issues forced the club again to withdraw after this. Since the club has been reincarnated as Blumenau Entretenimentos Comunitários and Blumenau Sport Club Madureira, participating in the third state division in 2008 and 2013 respectively, where it achieved the second place and promotion.

As per 2014 the club plays again as Blumenau Esporte Clube and finished the second tier Série B of the state league of Santa Catarina in sixth position. In the following year Blumenau finished tenth and last, leading to relegation to Série C.

Other local clubs in Blumenau are Associação Blumenauense de Futebol, founded in 1999 and at some stages in the third state division, and the Clube Atlético Metropolitano, founded in 2002, which since has established itself in the first state division and participates since 2010 nationally in the Série D.

== Historic logos ==
Brasil FC - 1919–36

Palmeiras EC - 1944–80

Blumenau EC - 1980s

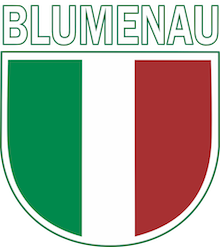
Blumenau EC - 2021–2025

== Honours ==
=== Official tournaments ===
State
Competitions	Titles	Seasons
Campeonato Catarinense Série B	1	1987
Campeonato Catarinense Série C	2^{s}	2017, 2021

- record
- ^{S} shared record

=== Others tournaments ===
==== City ====
- Campeonato Blumenauense (11): 1941, 1942, 1944, 1945, 1946, 1947, 1948, 1955, 1959, 1960, 1962
- Torneio Início de Blumenau (4): 1944, 1947, 1950, 1964
- Taça Centenário da Cidade de Blumenau (1): 1950

=== Runners-up ===
- Campeonato Catarinense (6): 1927, 1928, 1932, 1947, 1955, 1988
- Campeonato Catarinense Série B (2): 1986, 1993
- Campeonato Catarinense Série C (2): 2013, 2023
