= Clube Atlético Tubarão =

Atlético Tubarão
- Full name: Clube Atlético Tubarão
- Nickname: Furacão do Sul
- Founded: April 14, 2005; 21 years ago
- Ground: Estádio Domingos Silveira Gonzales, Tubarão, Santa Catarina, Brazil
- Capacity: 3,500
- President: Gilmar Negro Machado
- Head coach: Waguinho Dias
- League: Campeonato Catarinense Série B
- 2025: Catarinense Série B, 6th of 9
- Website: https://web.archive.org/web/20141129210408/http://atleticotubarao.com/
Home colours	Away colours	Third colours

Clube Atlético Tubarão is a Brazilian football team from Tubarão, Santa Catarina, Brazil, founded on April 14, 2005, as Associação Cultural, Recreativa e Esportiva Atlético Cidade Azul but changed to Club Atlético Tubarão name in 2007, and to the current name in 2009.

== History ==
In 2005 Cidade Azul competed in the Série B1 (Divisão de Accesso) from Campeonato Catarinense 2005. The team won the first stage, but lost in semifinals of Final Phase and qualified to Divisão Especial from Campeonato Catarinense 2006.

In 2006, the club finished in 11th placed in Divisão Especial and relegated to Divisão de Accesso 2007.

In 2007, the team won the first and second stage of Divisão Accesso from Campeonato Catarinense 2007 and qualified to Divisão Principal from Campeonato Catarinense 2008.

In 2008, after a bad campaign in First Stage of Campeonato Catarinense 2008, the team finished the Second Stage in 4th placed, the championship in 9th placed and it remained in Divisão Principal.

In 2009, the team made a bad campaign in Campeonato Catarinense 2009, finishing in last placed and relegated to Divisão Especial 2010. They changed their name to Associação Cultural Recreativa e Esportiva Atlético Cidade in that year.

== Current squad ==
Note: Flags indicate national team as defined under FIFA eligibility rules; some limited exceptions apply. Players may hold more than one non-FIFA nationality.

No.	Pos.	Nation	Player
2	DF	BRA	Alex
7	FW	BRA	Valdo Bacabal (on loan from Tombense)
8	MF	BRA	Ricardo Conceição
9	FW	BRA	Marcos Paulo (on loan from Grêmio)
12	DF	BRA	Ramón
13	DF	BRA	Lucas C.
14	DF	BRA	Aldo
15	MF	BRA	P. Vinicius
16	DF	BRA	Vitão
17	FW	BRA	Everton Jr.
18	MF	BRA	Alex N.
19	FW	COL	Rentería

No.	Pos.	Nation	Player
20	MF	BRA	Daniel Costa
22	DF	BRA	M. Vinicius
23	DF	BRA	Giordano
24	GK	BRA	Wesley
25	MF	BRA	Liel
27	MF	BRA	L. Crispim
28	MF	BRA	G. Amorim (on loan from Grêmio)
30	MF	BRA	Lucas Gabriel
31	FW	BRA	Israel
32	DF	BRA	Arilton
34	GK	BRA	Luiz Carlos
35	GK	BRA	M. Brandão
38	MF	PAR	Ferrón

== Honours ==
=== Official tournaments ===
State
Competitions	Titles	Seasons
Copa Santa Catarina	1	2017
Campeonato Catarinense Série C	2^{s}	2007, 2023

- record
- ^{S} shared record

=== Runners-up ===
- Campeonato Catarinense Série B (1): 2016
