= América Futebol Clube (SC) =

América
- Full name: América Futebol Clube
- Nicknames: Rubro; Galo da Zona Norte
- Founded: 14 June 1914; 112 years ago
- Ground: Estádio Olímpico Sadalla Amin Ghanem, Joinville, (SC)
- Capacity: 2,500
- Website: http://www.americajoinville.com.br
Home colours	Away colours	Third colours

América Futebol Clube is a football club from Joinville, with a population of more than half a million the largest city of the south Brazilian state of Santa Catarina. The club, founded on 14 June 1914, won between 1947 and 1971 five times the state championship of Santa Catarina, the Campeonato Catarinense. In the national level, América took part in second level of the national championship of 1971, where it finished on the 15th place. In 1976 a merger of the football operations with the traditional rivals Caxias FC gave birth to the Joinville Esporte Clube, which since has won more than ten state championships.

In the second half of the 1980s América returned to football under its own name, albeit only on amateur level. Since the club won between 1989 and 2011 six times the amateur championship of its hometown.

Initially América was the dominant team of Joinville, winning the first four editions of the city championship of Joinville which was held 33 times between 1920 and 1962. Altogether América won the title 15 times, the same number as Caxcias FC which was founded in 1920 and shared the primacy in Joinville from circa the mid-1920s.

After Caxias brought the first state championship trophy to Joinville in 1929, América won the title in 1947, 1948, 1951, 1952 and 1971, the latter title qualifying the club for participating in the first edition of a second national tier, later named Série B, in the same year where the club finished 15th.

In 1976 a merger of the football operations of América and Caxias, which by then had won in 1954 and 1955 two more state titles, led to the foundation of the Joinville Esporte Clube under the leadership of a local entrepreneur, which since has won more than ten state championships, including a record eight consecutive titles in its early phase from 1978 to 1985. Both, Caxias and América were under great financial duress in that period.

== Notable players ==
Beto Fuscão, later a star of Grêmio FBPA in Porto Alegre and SE Palmeiras of São Paulo who played nine times for Brazil was with América from 1971 to 1972. Several players from América were top-scorers of the state championship of Santa Catarina:

- 1947: Nicácio (5 goals)
- 1948: Zabot (8)
- 1951: Bastinho (9)
- 1952: René
- 1972: Marcos (20)

== Honours ==
=== Official tournaments ===
State
Competitions	Titles	Seasons
Campeonato Catarinense	5	1947, 1948, 1951, 1952, 1971

=== Others tournaments ===
==== State Regional ====
- Copa Regional Norte Catarinense (4): 2004, 2005, 2011, 2013

==== City ====
- Liga Joinvilense de Futebol (15): 1942, 1943, 1947, 1948, 1951, 1952, 1953, 1989, 1993, 1994, 1995, 1997, 1999, 2011, 2014

=== Runners-up ===
- Campeonato Catarinense (4): 1942, 1943, 1953, 1969
