= Sociedade Esportiva, Recreativa e Cultural Guarani =

Guarani de Palhoça
- Full name: Sociedade Esportiva, Recreativa e Cultural Guarani
- Nickname: Bugre Palhocense
- Founded: 15 February 1928; 98 years ago
- Ground: Estádio Renato Silveira, Palhoça, Santa Catarina state, Brazil
- Capacity: 3,000
- League: Campeonato Catarinense Série C
- 2025: Catarinense Série C, 1st of 3 (champions)
- Website: https://www.guaranidepalhoca.com.br/
Home colors	Away colors

Sociedade Esportiva, Recreativa e Cultural Guarani, commonly known as Guarani de Palhoça, or simply as Guarani, is a Brazilian football club based in Palhoça, Santa Catarina state.

== History ==
The club was founded on February 15, 1928, as Guarani Futebol Clube, and professionalized in 2000. The club was renamed to its current name, Sociedade Esportiva, Recreativa e Cultural Guarani in 2003. They won the Campeonato Catarinense Second Level in 2003. The club will play in the Second Division of the Santa Catarina State Championship in 2014.

== Honours ==
=== Official tournaments ===
State
Competitions	Titles	Seasons
Campeonato Catarinense Série B	2	2003, 2012
Campeonato Catarinense Série C	1	2025

=== Others tournaments ===
==== City ====
- Campeonato Palhocense de Futebol (7): 1978, 1985, 1986, 1994, 1995, 1998, 1999

=== Runners-up ===
- Campeonato Catarinense Série B (1): 2014
- Campeonato Catarinense Série C (2): 2009, 2010

== Stadium ==
Sociedade Esportiva, Recreativa e Cultural Guarani play their home games at Estádio Renato Silveira. The stadium has a maximum capacity of 3,000 people.
