= Ibirama =

- Municipality
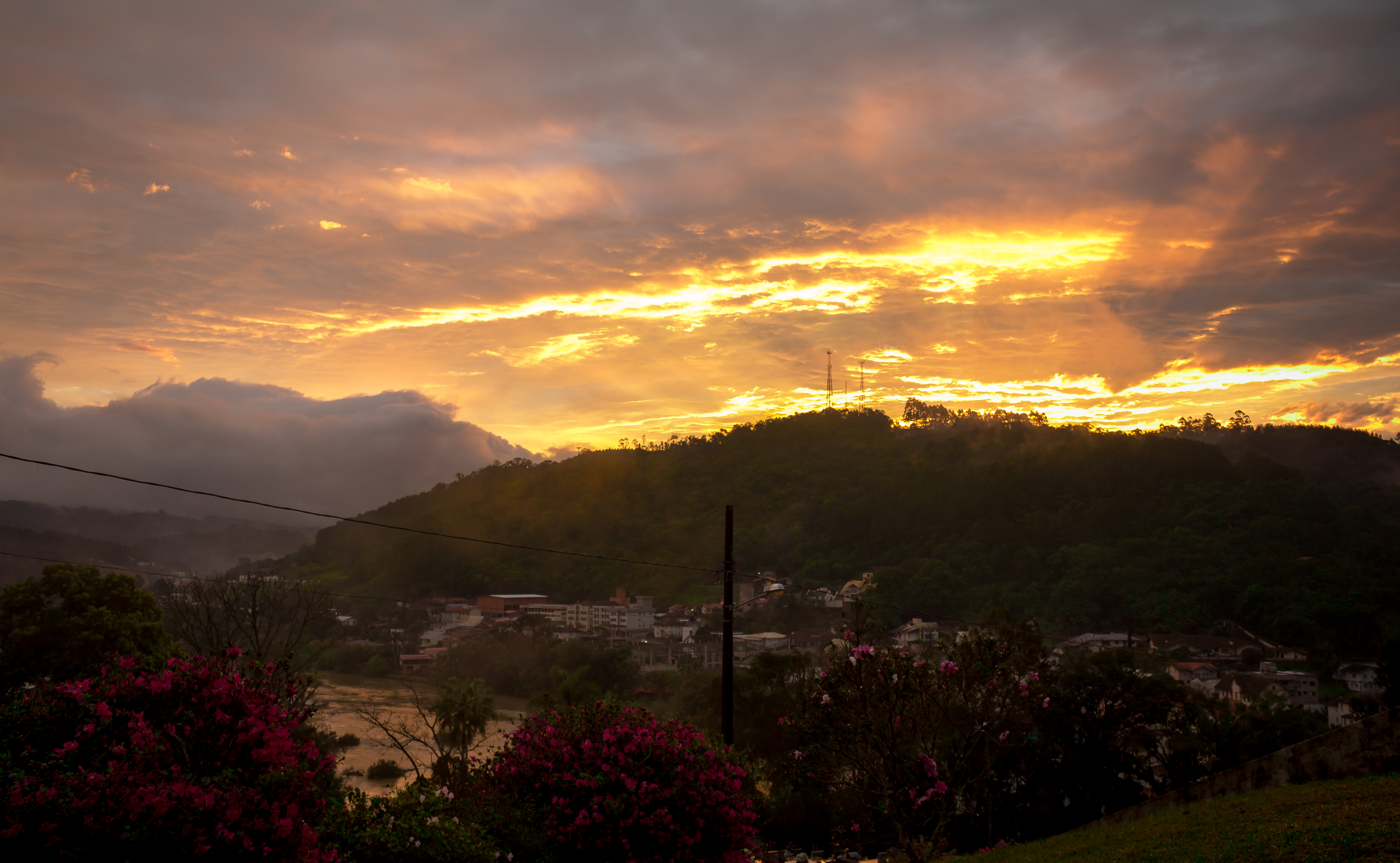

- Flag Coat of arms

- Location in Brazil
- Coordinates: 27°03′33″S 49°31′10″W
- Country: Brazil
- Region: South
- State: Santa Catarina
- Mesoregion: Vale do Itajai

Population (2020)
  - Total: 19,096
- Time zone: UTC -3
- Website: www.ibirama.sc.gov.br

Ibirama is a municipality in the state of Santa Catarina in the South region of Brazil.

== See also ==
- List of municipalities in Santa Catarina
