= Clube Atlético Hermann Aichinger =

Association football club in Brazil

Atlético Hermann Aichinger
- Full name: Clube Atlético Hermann Aichinger
- Nickname: Capeta
- Founded: September 20, 1951
- Ground: Estádio da Baixada, Ibirama, Brazil
- Capacity: 6,000
- Chairman: Genésio Ayres Marchetti
- Website: http://www.atleticoha.com.br/
Home colours	Away colours

Clube Atlético Hermann Aichinger, or Atlético Ibirama as they are usually called, is a currently inactive Brazilian football team from Ibirama in Santa Catarina, founded on September 20, 1951. The club competed in the Brazilian Championship Third Level in 2004 and 2005.

== History ==
Clube Atlético Hermann Aichinger was founded on September 20, 1951, succeeding Sociedade Desportiva Industrial, a team created in July 1944. The foundation meeting occurred at Geraldo Stoll Bar. The club's first president was Alberto Lessa, and both the club's football field and head office were rented. It is named after Hermann Aichinger, who donated the plot of land where the club's field and headquarters were built.

In 2004, Hermann Aichinger competed in the Brazilian Championship Third Level, reaching the third stage of the competition.

== Stadium ==
Home stadium is the Estádio Hermann Aichinger, which is commonly known as Estádio da Baixada. It has a maximum capacity of 6,000 spectators. Record attendance was on April 17, 2005, when 6,022 spectators saw in the decisive match for the State Championship the 0-1 defeat against Criciúma.

== Honours ==
=== Official tournaments ===
State
Competitions	Titles	Seasons
Campeonato Catarinense Série B	2	1993, 2001

=== Runners-up ===
- Campeonato Catarinense (2): 2004, 2005
- Campeonato Catarinense Série B (2): 2004, 2011
