= Clube Atlético Metropolitano =

Association football club in Brazil

Metropolitano
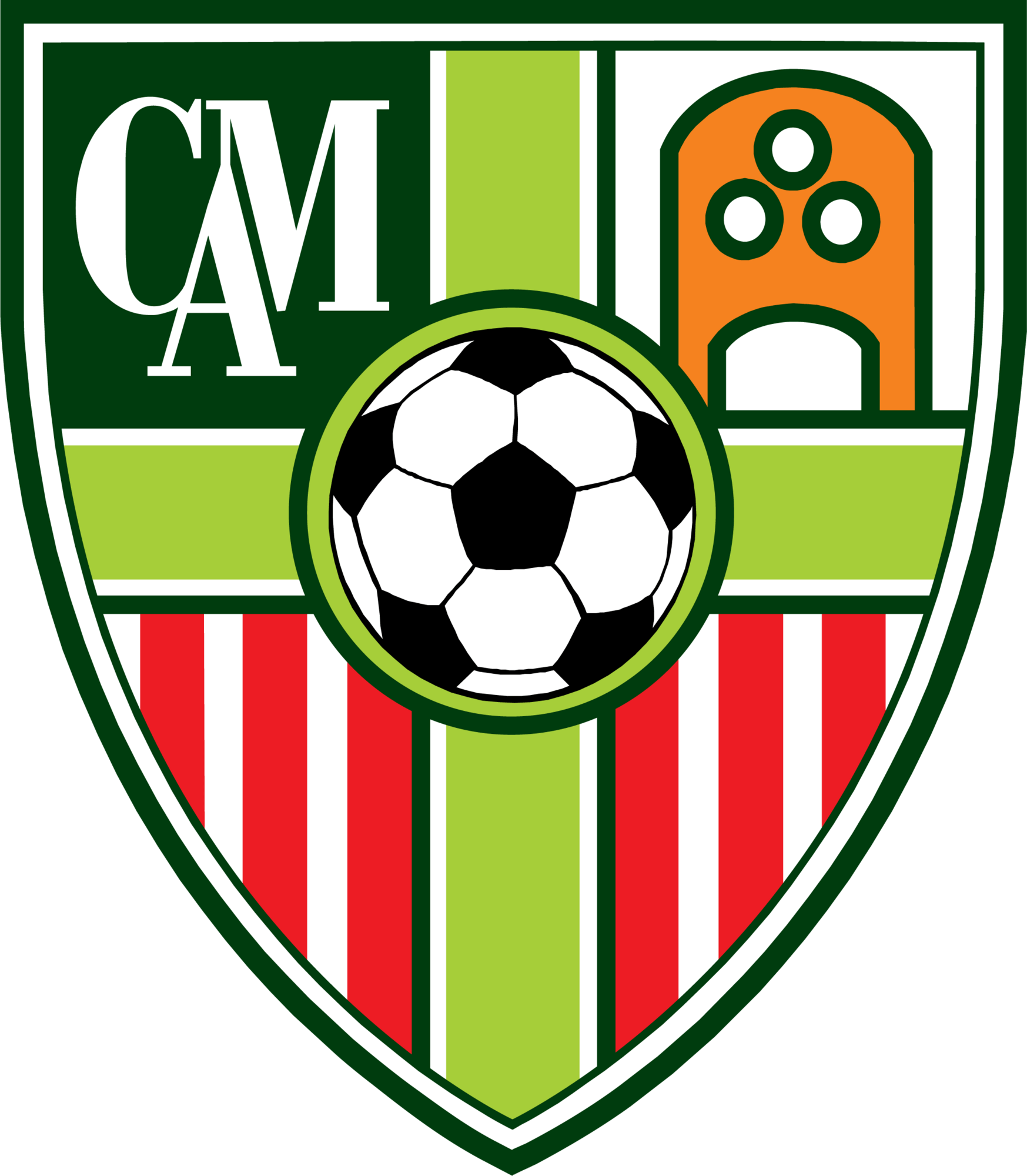
- Full name: Clube Atlético Metropolitano
- Nicknames: Metrô; Verdão
- Founded: January 22, 2002; 24 years ago
- Ground: SESI, Blumenau, Brazil
- Capacity: 3,624
- President: Valdair Matias
- Head coach: Isaque Pereira
- League: Campeonato Catarinense Série B
- 2025: Catarinense Série B, 4th of 9
- Website: metropolitano.net (archived)
Home colors	Away colors	Third colors

Clube Atlético Metropolitano is a Brazilian football team based in the city of Blumenau, Santa Catarina state. Founded on January 22, 2002, its official colors are green and white.

== Current squad ==
Note: Flags indicate national team as defined under FIFA eligibility rules; some limited exceptions apply. Players may hold more than one non-FIFA nationality.

No.	Pos.	Nation	Player
—	GK	BRA	Igor Koehler
—	GK	BRA	Zé Carlos
—	GK	BRA	João Ricardo
—	DF	BRA	Clau
—	DF	BRA	Persuhn
—	DF	BRA	Mike
—	DF	BRA	Romário
—	DF	BRA	Guilherme Café
—	DF	BRA	Paulinho
—	DF	BRA	Dudu
—	DF	BRA	Fred
—	DF	BRA	Rhuan
—	DF	BRA	Jeffinho
—	MF	BRA	Renan
—	MF	BRA	Dudu
—	MF	BRA	Zé Vitor

No.	Pos.	Nation	Player
—	MF	BRA	Leandro Melo
—	MF	BRA	Negueba
—	MF	BRA	Michel Schmöller
—	MF	BRA	Grando
—	MF	BRA	Juninho
—	MF	BRA	Ruan
—	MF	BRA	Angelo
—	MF	BRA	Netinho
—	FW	BRA	Kaique
—	FW	BRA	Nathan
—	FW	BRA	Bruninho
—	FW	BRA	Weslley
—	FW	ARG	Mariano Trípodi
—	FW	BRA	Cainan
—	FW	BRA	Lucas

== Honours ==
=== Official tournaments ===
State
Competitions	Titles	Seasons
Campeonato Catarinense Série B	1	2018

=== Others tournaments ===
==== International ====
- Centenary Tournament of FC Lustenau 07 (1): 2007

=== Runners-up ===
- Copa Santa Catarina (2): 2009, 2013
- Campeonato Catarinense Série B (1): 2026

== Season records ==
Season	Campeonato Catarinense		Copa Santa Catarina	Campeonato Brasileiro		
Season	Division	Position	Copa Santa Catarina	Division	Stage	Position
2002	B	5th				
2003	B	3rd				
2004	B	8th				
2005	A	7th				
2006	A	6th				
2007	A	8th				
2008	A	4th	5th	C	First Stage	56th
2009	A	8th	2nd			
2010	A	6th	7th	D	Second Stage	17th
2011	A	7th	3rd	D	First Stage	27th
2012	A	5th	3rd	D	Round of 16	11th
2013	A	5th	2nd	D	Quarter-finals	7th
2014	A	4th		D	Round of 16	15th
2015	A	5th		D	First Stage	28th
2016	A	7th		D	First Stage	55th
2017	A	10th		D	Second Stage	27th
2018	B	1st	9th			
2019	A	9th				
