= Magalhães =

Magalhães (pronounced [mɐɣɐˈʎɐ̃jʃ] in European Portuguese and [maɡaˈʎɐ̃js] in Brazilian Portuguese) is a Portuguese surname, sometimes rendered in English as Magellan. Notable people with the surname include:

Coat of arms of the Magalhães family

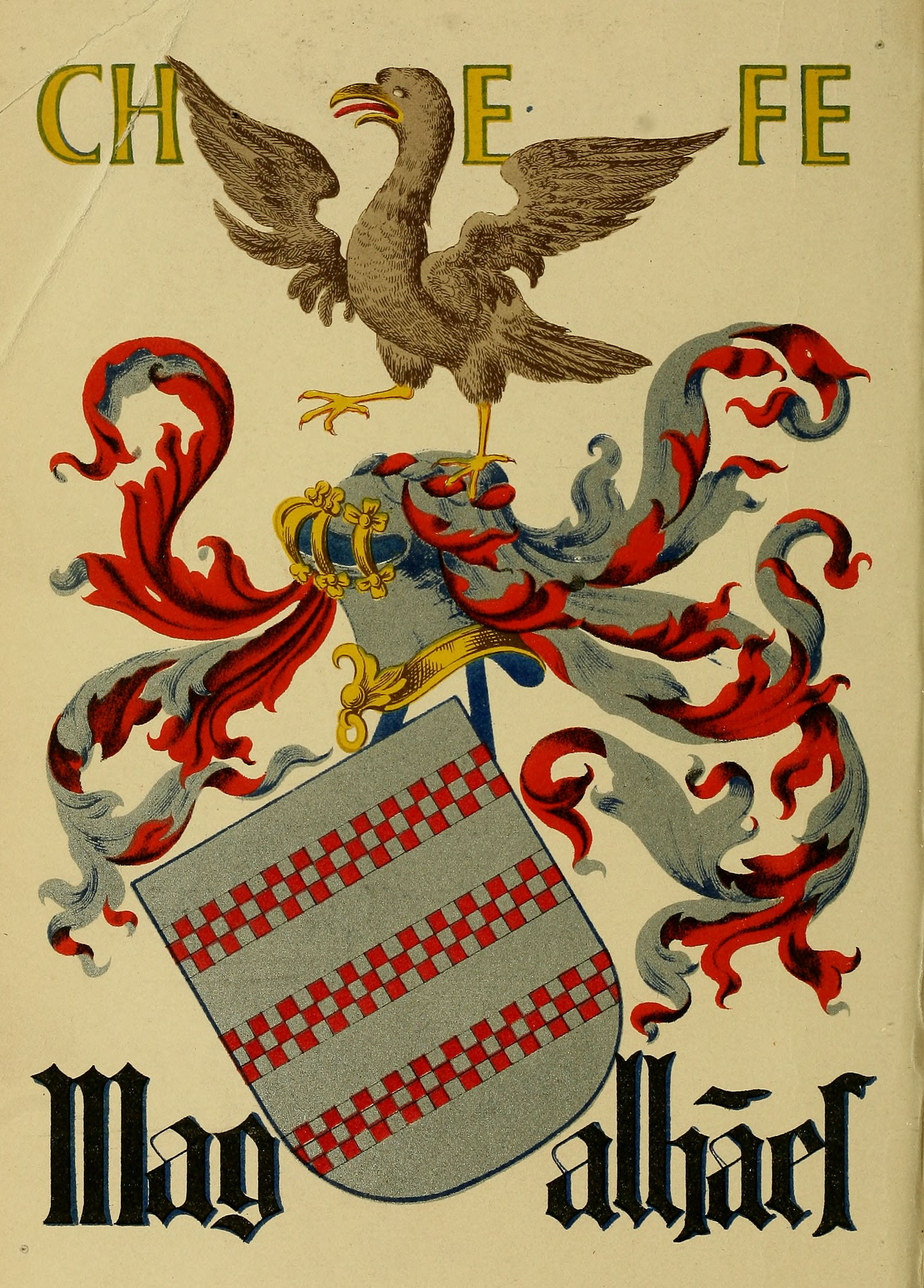
Coat of arms of Ferdinand Magellan

== General ==
- Álvaro Magalhães (writer), Portuguese writer
- Amanda Magalhães (born 1991), Brazilian actress, singer-songwriter, pianist and producer
- Ana Maria Magalhães, Brazilian film actress and director
- Antônio Carlos Magalhães, Brazilian politician
- Armindo Freitas-Magalhães, Portuguese psychologist
- Assusete Magalhães (1949–2025), Brazilian magistrate
- Carlos Leôncio de Magalhães, Brazilian farmer and businessman
- Fernando Magalhães, Brazilian obstetrician
- Fernão de Magalhães (Ferdinand Magellan) (1480–1521), Portuguese explorer who led the first expedition around the world
- Filipe de Magalhães, Portuguese composer
- Gabriel de Magalhães (1610–1677), Portuguese Jesuit missionary in China
- Gonçalves de Magalhães, Brazilian poet, playwright, medician and diplomat
- João Pedro de Magalhães, Portuguese microbiologist
- Joaquim Magalhães Mota, Portuguese lawyer and politician
- José de Magalhães Pinto, Brazilian politician and banker
- José Roberto Magalhães Teixeira, Brazilian politician
- Mallu Magalhães, Brazilian musician
- Manuel Magalhaes (1911-1996), Chilean politician
- Marcos Magalhães, Brazilian film director
- Pedro Ayres Magalhães (born 1959), Portuguese musician
- Rosa Magalhães, Brazilian carnival artist
- Solange Magalhães, Brazilian painter

== Sports ==
- Álvaro Magalhães, Portuguese footballer
- Ana Vitória "Tota" Magalhães, Brazilian cyclist
- Bruno Magalhães, Rallycar driver
- Carlos de Oliveira Magalhães, Portuguese footballer
- Cleidimar Magalhães Silva, Brazilian footballer
- Evandro Teixeira Magalhães, Brazilian footballer
- Fábio Luiz Magalhães, Brazilian beach volleyballer
- Gabriel Magalhães, Brazilian footballer
- Jaime Magalhães, Portuguese footballer
- Luís Magalhães, Portuguese basketball coach
- Luís Pedro Magalhães, Portuguese auto racing driver
- Osmar Magalhães (born 1960), Brazilian football player and manager
- Paulo Magalhães (born 1989), Chilean footballer
- Paulo César Magalhães (born 1963), Brazilian football player and agent
- Thiago Magalhães Pereira (born 1984), Brazilian footballer
- Vinny Magalhães, Brazilian martial artist
- Vinicius Magalhães (Draculino), Brazilian martial artist
