= Osmar Magalhães =

Brazilian football manager and player

Personal information
- Full name: Osmar Fernando Magalhães
- Date of birth: 1960 (age 65–66)
- Place of birth: Santana do Livramento, Rio Grande do Sul, Brazil
- Position: Midfielder

Youth career
- Internacional

Senior career*
Years	Team	Apps	(Gls)
1977–1981	Internacional		
1977–1980	→ São Borja (loan)		
1980–1981	→ America-RJ (loan)		
1981–1986	Coquimbo Unido		
1987–1988	Deportes La Serena		
1988–1990	Deportes Antofagasta		
1993	Novo Horizontino		
1993–1994	Caçadores		

Managerial career
- 2008: Futebol Clube do Porto
- 2009: Hercílio Luz
- 2009–2010: Joaçaba
- 2011: Atlético Gloriense
- 2012: Imperatriz
- 2012–2015: Atlético Gloriense
- 2015–2016: Joaçaba
- 2017–2018: Atlético Gloriense
- 2018–2019: FF Sports (youth)
- 2020: FF Sports
- 2023: Guarany-AL
- * Club domestic league appearances and goals

Osmar Fernando Magalhães (born 1960), sportingly known as Magalhães in Brazil and Bozzo in Chile, is a Brazilian football manager and former player who played as a midfielder. Besides Brazil, he played in Chile.

== Playing career ==
A product of the Internacional youth system, where he was at all divisions, Magalhães was loaned to São Borja and America-RJ. The last one, in the Brazilian Série A.

In 1981, he moved to Chile thanks to the Chilean coach Ramón Climent, who watched him playing for America-RJ, and joined Coquimbo Unido. A historical player of the club, he spent six seasons with them and got the promotion to the 1984 Chilean Primera División. In the 1984 season, he made seventeen appearances. In 1987, he switched to the classic rival, Deportes La Serena.

From 1988 to 1990, he played for Deportes Antofagasta, his last club in Chile and, later, the training club of his son, Paulo.

His last clubs were Novo Horizontino Futebol Clube from São Paulo and Caçadores from Santa Catarina, in his homeland.

== Coaching career ==
Magalhães began his career as fitness coach with Grêmio from 1996 to 2001. After he worked for clubs from Rio Grande do Sul (Canoas, Passo Fundo, Veranópolis, Guarany de Bagé and GE Bagé), Santa Catarina (Inter de Lages) and Paraná (AA Iguaçu).

In 2008, he began his coaching career with Futebol Clube do Porto. After, he coached EC Hercílio Luz, Joaçaba, Atlético Gloriense, Imperatriz and Francisco Ferro Sports.

In 2023, he signed with Guarany-AL.

== Personal life ==
Magalhães is the father of the Chile international Paulo Magalhães, who was born in Porto Alegre, Brazil, to a Chilean mother.

Belonging to a football family, his father of the same name was a goalkeeper of several teams, his younger brother, Paulo César, won both the 1983 Copa Libertadores and the 1983 Intercontinental Cup as a player of Grêmio and has served as his son's agent. Also, he is the uncle of the Brazilian footballers Rafael Esdras Magalhães and Thiago Pereira.

His sister, Neide, was a basketball player.

At the beginning of his career in Brazil, he was known as Osmar Gaúcho. In the Chilean football, he was known as Bozzo or Bozó.
