= Nhonhô Magalhães =

Brazilian businessman

Carlos Leôncio de Magalhães
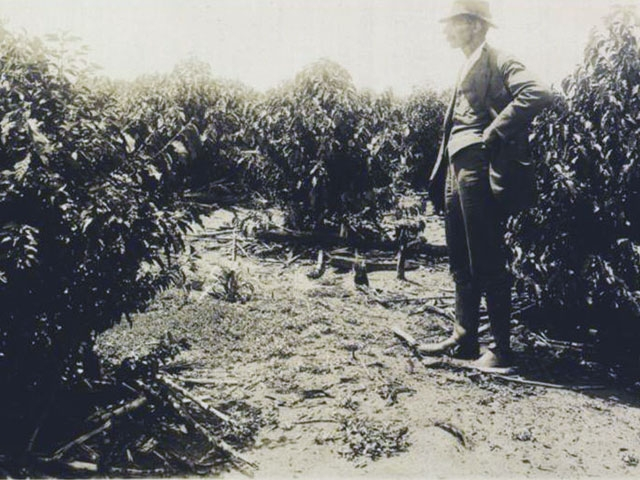
- Nhonhô Magalhães in one of his farms.
- Born: July 6, 1875; Araraquara
- Died: 1931; São Paulo, SP
- Citizenship: Brazilian
- Spouse: Ernestina Reis de Magalhães
- Children: Carlos Reis de Magalhães, Oswaldo Reis de Magalhães, Ernestina de Paiva Meira, Maria Cecilia Duprat, Paulo Reis de Magalhães, Adelaide Reis de Magalhães and José Carlos Reis de Magalhães

Carlos Leôncio (Nhonhô) de Magalhães (1875 in Araraquara – 1931 in São Paulo) was a Brazilian farmer and businessman. Nhonhô is considered to be one of the "coffee kings" and was one of the richest Brazilian farmers of the early 20th century. Carlos Leôncio de Magalhães started to work as a farmer during his early life and his name is connected to some of the most important farms of the Western part of the state of São Paulo, among which are Cambuí, Barreiro Rico and Itaquerê. Later on, these farms developed into towns, such as Matão, Nova Europa, Santa Ernestina, Gavião Peixoto and Tabatinga.

== Family ==
=== Ancestors ===
The Magalhães (or in English "Magellan") are a family whose origins are in Portugal. Nhonhô's grandparents, Francisco Carlos de Magalhães and Bernarda Rodrigues Monteiro, emigrated from Portugal and settled in Niterói, Rio de Janeiro, where they became affluent businessmen. Their eldest son, Carlos Baptista de Magalhães, was educated in two of the most exclusive schools in Brazil at that time, the Colégio do Santuário da Serra do Caraça (in the state of Minas Gerais) and the Colégio Pedro II (in the state of Rio de Janeiro), where he studied with some of the most prominent figures of Brazilian national politics, such as Joaquim Nabuco and Rodrigues Alves. However, after Francisco Carlos de Magalhães lost a considerable part of his wealth, Carlos Baptista de Magalhães had to move to Araraquara, São Paulo, in order to start working as a commercial representative.

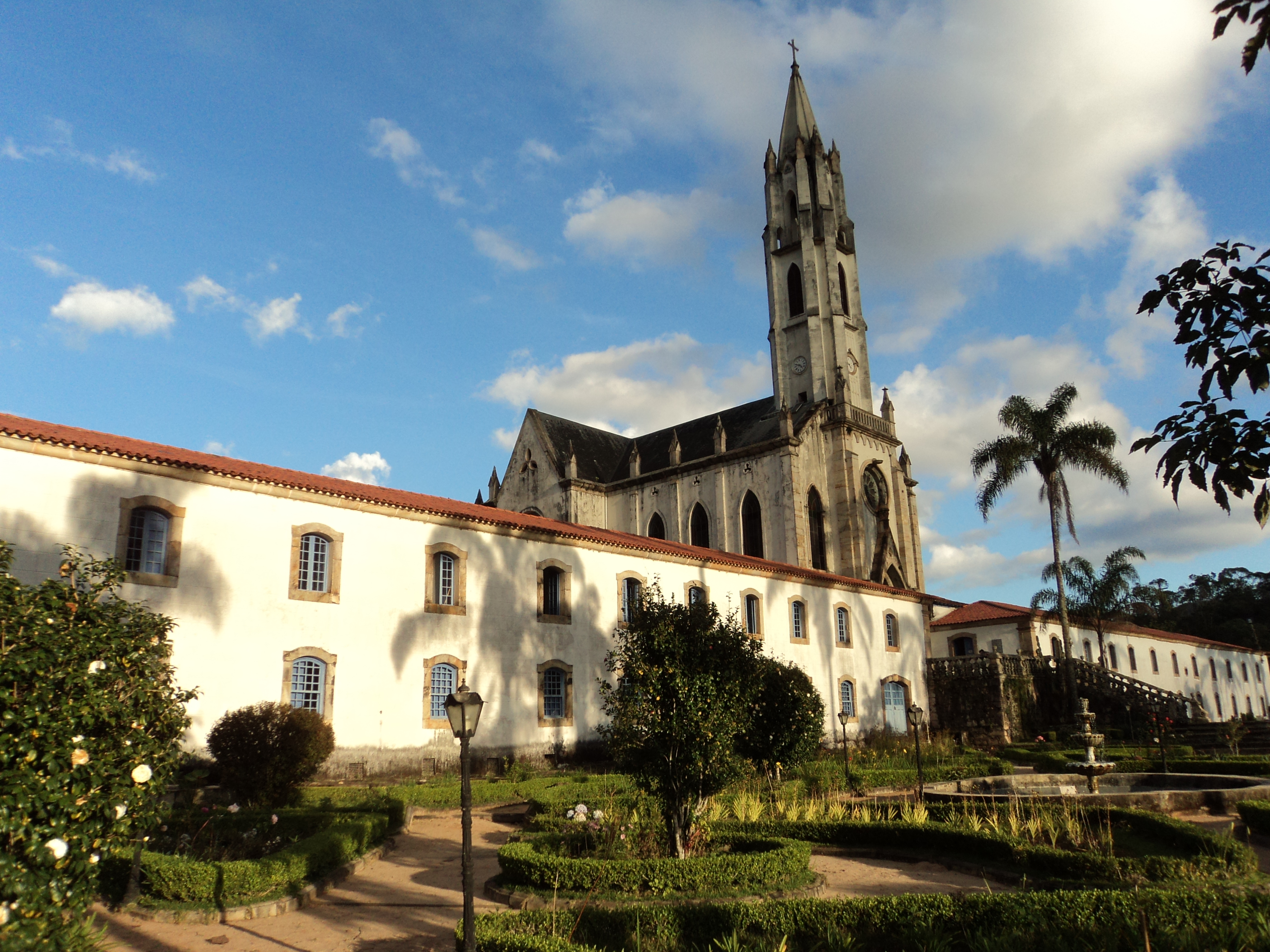
Colégio do Santuário da Serra do Caraça

Once in Araraquara, Carlos Baptista de Magalhães married D. Leôncia de Freitas Magalhães, the daughter of Justino Correia de Freitas and Anna de Arruda, from the traditional Arruda family of Araraquara. Carlos Baptista de Magalhães became a very important land owner, banker, businessman and politician and, in partnership with the family of his wife, founded the Estrada de Ferro Araraquara (Araraquara Railway) in 1895, becoming its first president. He was also a town councilor and led a monarchial uprise in the region, known as Revolução do Sertãozinho (Sertãozinho Revolution). Nonetheless, a few years after he assumed the presidency of the Partido Republicano Paulista - PRP (Republican Party of São Paulo).

Through his mother's family, Carlos Leôncio de Magalhães is connected to the most traditional families of São Paulo, among which one can identify the Arrudas, the Laras, the Alvarengas, the Prados, the Taques, the Proenças, the Barros, the Pires, the Cubas and the Moraes de Antas. These families, which rank among the first in Brazilian soil, descend from Portuguese gentry and are connected to the Portuguese, French, Aragonese, Castilian and Navarrese royal families.

Carlos Leôncio de Magalhães had two sisters, Maria Dulce de Magalhães (Nicota), married to Valdomiro Pinto Alves, and Maria Elisa de Magalhães (Zilota), married to Sebastião Lebeis. Waldomiro was the son of Antonio Alves Pereira de Almeida and Gertrudes Eufrozina Pinto. Sebastião Lebeis (Rio Claro, 1874 – São Paulo 1936) was the son of Guilherme Lebeis and Escolástica de Arruda Botelho.

=== Lineage ===
Carlos Leôncio de Magalhães married Ernestina Reis de Magalhães (Rio de Janeiro, 1876 – São Paulo, 1968), the daughter of José Monteiro Reis and Adelaide Monteiro Palha, from Rio de Janeiro. They had eight children: Maria José (who died before she was one year old), Carlos (1903 – 1985), Oswaldo (19?? – 1974), Ernestina (1908–2000), Maria Cecilia (1911–1999), Paulo (1913 – 1996), Adelaide (1917) and José Carlos (1921–2002). Carlos Reis de Magalhães, Oswaldo Reis de Magalhães, Paulo Reis de Magalhães and José Carlos Reis de Magalhães were the managers of the Itaquerê Company, which had been founded by Nhonhô Magalhães and concentrated the majority of his estates. Beyond this occupation, Paulo Magalhães was the president of several national and multinational companies, such as Alpargatas, Philips and Rhodia (company) and José Carlos de Magalhães became a Brazilian ornithologist, whose researches were made at the Barreiro Rico Farm.

Carlos married Marieta Lion and had two daughters. Oswaldo married Jandira Rondon and didn't have any children. Paulo married Marina Bastos and had five children. Ernestina married Roberto de Paiva Meira and had two children. Maria Cecilia married Antonio Ângelo Maria Duprat, viscount of Duprat, and had three children. Adelaide married Nestor Sacramento Rocha and had two daughters. José Carlos married Cecília Alves and had five children.

In spite of being tightly connected to the countryside, Carlos Leôncio de Magalhães bought a house in the early 1910s, located in Higienópolis (a wealthy neighborhood in São Paulo central area) and moved in with all his family. A few years later he decided to build a new house in the same avenue, but he died in 1931, before seeing the achievement of his last project. He was 56 years old when died of cancer.

== Businesses ==
=== Farms ===
Nhonhô started his professional life as a farm manager, helping his father with the administration of the family properties. When Carlos Leôncio was around twenty years old he started developing new farms in Matão, in order to sell them afterwards to foreign investors.

==== Cambuí Farm ====
The best investment of Nhonhô's life was the Cambuí (or Cambuhy) farm. In 1911 he bought a huge portion of land (around 605 square kilometers, or 233.6 square miles), an area in which are located today three towns (Matão, Nova Europa and Gavião Peixoto). In this estate, Carlos Leôncio de Magalhães created the Companhia Agrícola e Pastoril d'Oeste de São Paulo - CIAPOSP, sold in 1924 to an English investment group for half a million pounds, or more than ten times what he had paid when he bought the farm. This was the highest value paid for any property in Brazil until then. This English group, called Brazilian Warrant Co, established the Cambuhy Coffee and Cotton Estates Limited.

The estate that had been sold to the English investment group was formed by 19 farms (Cambuí, Alabama, Boa Vista, Santa Josefa, Retiro, Palmas, Guanabara, Niterói, Água Sumida, São João, Flórida, Califórnia, Arizona, Contribuição, Mato Grosso, Barreiro, Virgínia, Tamandaré and Pedregulho), which had in total 3 million coffee trees and approximately 15 thousand cows. These farms were connected by 300 kilometers of roads and 70 kilometers of railways with ten railway stations (Toryba, Teixeira Leite, Cambuhy, Uparoba, Gavião Peixoto, Nova Paulicéia, Nova Europa, Matão, Ponte Alta e Santa Josefa). The Cambuí farm had more than 3 thousand employees and produced around 3,5 million kilos of coffee per year.

==== Itaquerê farm ====
Nhonhô kept a small (but yet considerable) part of the Cambuí farm, where he established the Itaquerê farm. The name of this estate comes from the Itaquerê river, which crosses the farm. The property had 21.5 square miles and it was built to be a model of diversified production, even if coffee continued to be its main output. Carlos Leôncio also built a sugar mill (which was operated by the Companhia Açucareira Itaquerê, today called Usina Santa Fé) and a small hydroelectric power plant. Both plants are still in operation and the power plant still uses all the original machinery from 1928.

The Itaquerê farm was sold by Carlos Leôncio's heirs to the Malzoni family, which changed the name of the property to Santa Fé.

==== Barreiro Rico Farm ====
Another farm that belonged to Nhonhô was the Barreiro Rico, which was bought in 1926 and which is located in Anhembi, alongside the Tietê River. This farm of 74.75 square miles produced wood and bred nelore. The breeding of this type of cattle started in 1935, making the Barreiro Rico one of the first breeding farms still in activity in Brazil. At the beginning Nhonhô himself was the responsible for the management of the farm (from 1926 to 1931), but after that his sons Oswaldo (from 1931 to 1958) and José Carlos (from 1958 to 2001) administrated the estate.
