= João Gabriel (footballer, born 1996) =

Brazilian footballer (born 1996)

Personal information
- Full name: João Gabriel Ramos de Souza
- Date of birth: 12 February 1996 (age 30)
- Place of birth: Matão, Brazil
- Height: 1.93 m (6 ft 4 in)
- Position: Forward

Team information
- Current team: Futebol Clube do Porto

Youth career
- 2012–2013: Comercial
- 2013–2016: Cruzeiro

Senior career*
Years	Team	Apps	(Gls)
2015–2016	Cruzeiro	0	(0)
2015	→ Red Bull Brasil (loan)	0	(0)
2017–2019	Sagamihara	67	(28)
2019	→ Tochigi City (loan)	4	(3)
2020–2021	Kagoshima United	4	(0)
2021–2022	Tochigi City	11	(3)
2023	Sertãozinho	0	(0)
2023–2024	Passo Fundo	0	(0)
2023–2024	→ Joinville (loan)	0	(0)
2024–2025	Joinville	1	(1)
2025	Tubarão	0	(0)
2026	Barcelona	5	(0)
2026–	Porto	0	(0)
- * Club domestic league appearances and goals as of 03:11, 3 March 2026 (UTC)

João Gabriel Ramos de Souza (born 12 February 1996), commonly known as João Gabriel, is a Brazilian footballer who currently plays as a forward for the Campeonato Baiano side Futebol Clube do Porto.

== Club career ==
João Gabriel joined Sagamihara in early 2017 from Cruzeiro.

== Statistics ==
As of 29 March 2019.

Club	Season	League			Cup		Continental		Other		Total	
Club	Season	Division	Apps	Goals	Apps	Goals	Apps	Goals	Apps	Goals	Apps	Goals
Cruzeiro	2015	Série A	0	0	0	0	–		0	0	0	0
Cruzeiro	2016	Série A	0	0	0	0	–		0	0	0	0
Cruzeiro	Total		0	0	0	0	0	0	0	0	0	0
Red Bull Brasil (loan)	2015	Série D	0	0	0	0	–		0	0	0	0
Sagamihara	2017	J3 League	21	7	0	0	–		0	0	21	7
Sagamihara	2018	J3 League	30	17	0	0	–		0	0	30	17
Sagamihara	2019	J3 League	16	4	0	0	–		0	0	16	4
Sagamihara	Total		67	28	0	0	0	0	0	0	67	28
Tochigi City (loan)	2019	Kantō Soccer League	4	3	0	0	–		0	0	4	3
Kagoshima United	2020	J3 League	1	0	0	0	–		0	0	1	0
Career total			72	31	0	0	0	0	0	0	72	31
