= Campeonato Catarinense Série C =

Football league in Santa Catarina, Brazil

- Organising body: FCF
- Founded: 2004; 22 years ago
- Country: Brazil
- State: (Santa Catarina (state)) Santa Catarina
- Level on pyramid: 3
- Promotion to: Série B
- Current champions: Inter de Lages (2nd title) (2026)
- Most championships: 5 clubs (2 titles each)
- Website: FCF Official website

The Campeonato Catarinense Série C is the third tier of the professional state football league in the Brazilian state of Santa Catarina. It is run by the Santa Catarina Football Federation (FCF).

== List of champions ==
=== Divisão de Acesso ===
| Season | Champions | Runners-up |
|---|---|---|
| 2004 | Juventus (JS) (1) | Brusque |
| 2005 | Próspera (1) | Figueirense B |
| 2006 | Camboriuense (1) | Videira |
| 2007 | Cidade Azul (1) | Imbituba |
| 2008 | Porto (1) | Videira |
| 2009 | XV de Outubro (1) | Guarani de Palhoça |
| 2010 | Caxias (1) | Guarani de Palhoça |
| 2011 | Biguaçu (1) | Caçador |
| 2012 | Caçador (1) | Sport Jaraguá |
| 2013 | Inter de Lages (1) | Blumenau |

=== Série C ===
| Season | Champions | Runners-up |
|---|---|---|
| 2014 | Juventus (S) (1) | Sport Jaraguá |
| 2015 | Barra (1) | NEC |
| 2016 | CA Itajaí (1) | Fluminense |
| 2017 | Blumenau (1) | Curitibanos |
| 2018 | Próspera (2) | CA Itajaí |
| 2019 | Caçador (2) | CA Itajaí |
| 2020 | Atlético Catarinense (1) | Nação |
| 2021 | Blumenau (2) | Caravaggio |
| 2022 | Santa Catarina (1) | Caçador |
| 2023 | Atlético Tubarão (2) | Blumenau |
| 2024 | Fluminense (1) | Porto |
| 2025 | Guarani de Palhoça (1) | Sport Jaraguá |
| 2026 | Inter de Lages (2) | Manchester |

=== Notes ===
- Camboriuense is the currently Camboriú FC.
- Cidade Azul is the currently Atlético Tubarão.

== Titles by team ==
Teams in bold still active.

| Rank | Club | Winners | Winning years |
|---|---|---|---|
| 1 | **Atlético Tubarão** | 2 | 2007, 2023 |
| 1 | **Blumenau** | 2 | 2017, 2021 |
| 1 | **Caçador** | 2 | 2012, 2019 |
| 1 | **Inter de Lages** | 2 | 2013, 2026 |
| 1 | Próspera | 2 | 2005, 2018 |
| 6 | **Atlético Catarinense** | 1 | 2020 |
| 6 | **Barra** | 1 | 2015 |
| 6 | Biguaçu | 1 | 2011 |
| 6 | CA Itajaí | 1 | 2016 |
| 6 | **Camboriú** | 1 | 2006 |
| 6 | Caxias | 1 | 2010 |
| 6 | **Fluminense** | 1 | 2024 |
| 6 | **Guarani de Palhoça** | 1 | 2025 |
| 6 | **Juventus (JS)** | 1 | 2004 |
| 6 | Juventus (S) | 1 | 2014 |
| 6 | **Porto** | 1 | 2008 |
| 6 | **Santa Catarina** | 1 | 2022 |
| 6 | XV de Outubro | 1 | 2009 |

=== By city ===
| City | Championships | Clubs |
|---|---|---|
| Blumenau | 2 | Blumenau (2) |
| Caçador | 2 | Caçador (2) |
| Criciúma | 2 | Próspera (2) |
| Joinville | 2 | Caxias (1), Fluminense (1) |
| Lages | 2 | Internacional (2) |
| Tubarão | 2 | Atlético Tubarão (2) |
| Balneário Camboriú | 1 | Barra (1) |
| Biguaçu | 1 | Biguaçu (1) |
| Camboriú | 1 | Camboriú (1) |
| Indaial | 1 | XV de Outubro (1) |
| Itajaí | 1 | CA Itajaí (1) |
| Jaraguá do Sul | 1 | Juventus (1) |
| Palhoça | 1 | Guarani (1) |
| Porto União | 1 | Porto (1) |
| Rio do Sul | 1 | Santa Catarina (1) |
| São José | 1 | Atlético Catarinense (1) |
| Seara | 1 | Juventus (1) |
