= Magallanes =

Magallanes may refer to:

- Ferdinand Magellan (1480–1521), Portuguese explorer who led part of the first expedition around the world
- Strait of Magellan, the strait between the Pacific and Atlantic Oceans, located in Chile

== Places ==
- Magallanes Department, Santa Cruz Province in Argentina
- Magallanes y la Antártica Chilena Region in Chile
  - Magallanes Province, within this region
- Magallanes, the official name of the Chilean city of Punta Arenas between 1927 and 1938
- Magallanes, Agusan del Norte in the Philippines
- Magallanes, Cavite in the Philippines
- Magallanes, Sorsogon in the Philippines
- Magallanes Interchange in the Philippines
- Magallanes station in the Philippines
- Magallanes Village in the Philippines

== Sports ==
- Navegantes del Magallanes, a baseball club from Venezuela
- Deportes Magallanes, a football club from Chile

== Other uses ==
- Magallanes (surname)
- Magallanes (film), a 2014 Peruvian film
- Chilean corvette Magallanes (1873)
- Universidad de Magallanes in the Magallanes Region in Chile
- Portátil Magallanes, a rebrand of the Classmate PC laptop for distribution in Latin languages countries
- Ovejero magallánico, a dog originated in Chile

== See also ==
- Magellan (disambiguation)
