= Clube Atlético Juventus (SC) =

Juventus
- Full name: Clube Atlético Juventus
- Nickname(s): Fúria do Oeste
- Founded: 20 October 1962; 62 years ago
- Ground: Victório Pierozan, Seara
- Capacity: 1,700
- Chairman: Sadi Roque Balbinot
- Manager: Valcir Rebelatto
Home colours	Away colours

Clube Atlético Juventus, usually known as Juventus de Seara or simply Juventus, is a Brazilian football club from Seara, Santa Catarina.

== History ==
Initially focused only in the youth categories, Juventus started a senior team in late 2013, ahead of the following year's Campeonato Catarninense Série C. The club lifted the trophy unbeaten, with the goalscorer being Rodrigo Gral.

Promoted to the Série B, Juventus finished the tournament in the fourth position, and had Juninho Brandão as the championship's top goalscorer. On 16 November 2015, the club announced his withdrawal from the following year's tournament due to financial problems, and returned to only work with the youth categories.

== Honours ==
=== Official tournaments ===
State
Competitions	Titles	Seasons
Campeonato Catarinense Série C	1	2014
