= Magellan (disambiguation) =

Ferdinand Magellan (1480–1521) was a Portuguese explorer known for leading the first circumnavigation of the Earth.

Magellan may also refer to:

== People ==
- Jean Hyacinthe de Magellan (1723–1790), Portuguese natural philosopher
- Murielle Magellan (born 1967), French writer and theater director

== Places ==
- 4055 Magellan, an Amor asteroid
- Magellan Bay, Philippines
- Magellan's Cross, a geographic location in the Philippines
- Sea of Magellan, see Pacific Ocean
- Strait of Magellan, a geographic location in South America
- Magellan Rise, a suburb of Hamilton New Zealand

=== Geology ===
- Magellan Seamounts - Range in North West Pacific Ocean west of Marshall Islands.
- Magellan Rise - Oceanic Plateau east of the Marshall Islands
- North Magellan Rise - Ocean floor feature south west of Hawaii and east of the Marshall Islands

== Arts, entertainment, and media ==
=== Film and TV ===
- Magellan (film), a 2025 internationally co-produced epic historical drama film
- Magellan, a sequence of 24 short films by Hollis Frampton

=== Fictional entities ===
- Magellan, a fictional dragon from the American children's television series Eureeka's Castle
- Magellan, the survival space research vessel in the 2001 science fiction film Ice Planet
- Magellan, an interstellar ark or generation starship in Arthur C. Clarke's science fiction novel The Songs of Distant Earth

=== Other arts, entertainment, and media ===
- Magellan (band), a progressive rock band
- "Magellan", a 1971 novelty rap song by Yoyoy Villame

== Astronomy ==
- Magellan (spacecraft), a NASA uncrewed space mission to Venus
- Giant Magellan Telescope in Chile
- Magellan Telescopes at Las Campanas, Chile
- Magellanic Clouds, or Clouds of Magellan

== Brands and enterprises ==
- Magellan Aerospace, a Canadian aerospace manufacturer
- Magellan Data and Mapping Strategies, a political polling firm that serves Republican Party candidates and organizations
- Magellan Financial Group, an Australian investment manager
- Magellan Fund, a mutual fund offered by Fidelity Investments
- Magellan Midstream Partners, American oil pipeline corporation
- Magellan Navigation Inc, a maker of GPS equipment

== Circumnavigation and exploration ==
- Order of Magellan, given by the Circumnavigators Club

== Computing and technology ==
- Magellan (search engine), a forerunner of the Excite web portal
- Lotus Magellan, a file manager software

== Transportation ==
- Ferdinand Magellan (railcar), a former presidential rail car
- CMA CGM Magellan, a 2010 container ship
- MS Magellan, a former cruise ship
- SS Magellan, several steamships

== Other uses ==
- Magellan sheep dog, a dog originated in Chile

== See also ==
- Magalhães, the Portuguese form of the name
- Magellana, a moth genus
- Magallanes (disambiguation), the Spanish form of the name
- Magellanic (disambiguation)
