= Magellanic =

Magellanic may refer to:

- Magellanic Steppe, 7th largest desert in the world, see Patagonian Desert
- Magellanic Straits, a sea passageway at the tip of South America, see Strait of Magellan
- Magellanic subpolar forests, an ecoregion of southernmost Chile and Argentina
- Magellanic Premium, a major prize established in 1786 regarding navigation

== Astronomy ==
- Magellanic Clouds, two major Milky Way neighbouring galaxies, matter streams, or systems related to them:
  - Large Magellanic Cloud, a major satellite galaxy to the Milky Way
  - Small Magellanic Cloud, a smaller major satellite galaxy to the Milky Way
    - Mini Magellanic Cloud, a sub-satellite galaxy separating from the Small Magellanic Cloud
  - Magellanic Bridge, a neutral hydrogen stream with a few stars linking the two Magellanic Clouds, with a density of stars midway known as OGLE Island
  - Magellanic Stream, a neutral hydrogen gas halo and star envelope around the two Magellanic Clouds linking them to the Milky Way
- Magellanic spiral, a type of small galaxy
- Magellanic Catalogue of Stars

== Biology ==
- Magellanic horned owl, a large owl south of the central Andes, see Lesser horned owl
- Magellanic Long-clawed Mouse, also known as the Magellanic long-clawed akodont, see Chelemys delfini
- Magellanic penguin, a South American bird
- Magellanic plover, a wader shorebird in the extreme south of Argentina
- Magellanic rockcod, a species of cod icefish, see Maori cod
- Magellanic tuco-tuco, a South American rodent
- Magellanic woodpecker, a South American bird

== Science fiction ==
- The Magellanic Cloud, an English variant title of Obłok Magellana, a 1955 Polish science fiction novel by Stanislaw Lem
- The Magellanics, a science fiction novella by Alfred Coppel appearing in the Winter 1952 issue of Two Complete Science-Adventure Books
- The Horror from the Magellanic, a science fiction novelette appearing in the May 1969 issue of Amazing Stories by Edmond Hamilton

== Miscellaneous ==
- Swedish Magellanic Expedition, a scientific expedition (1907–09)

== See also ==
- Magellan (disambiguation)
