= Clube Atlético Catarinense =

Brazilian football club

Atlético Catarinense
- Full name: Clube Atlético Catarinense
- Nickname(s): CAC
- Founded: March 20, 2020; 5 years ago
- Ground: Estádio Ênio Amantino da Silva
- President: Daison Rodrigues
- Head coach: Arílson
- League: Campeonato Catarinense
- 2022: Catarinense Série B, 2nd
- Website: http://www.atleticocatarinense.com.br/
Home colours	Away colours

Clube Atlético Catarinense, commonly known as Atlético Catarinense, is a Brazilian football club based in São José, Santa Catarina.

== History ==
The club was founded in 2020 to represent the city of São José in professional football, which had not had a club since 2002. Initially playing in the Campeonato Catarinense Série C, the third tier of football in Santa Catarina, the club won the championship and a promotion to Série B. The club was the 2022 runner-up in Série B, losing to Criciúma in the championship.

== Honours ==
=== Official tournaments ===
State
Competitions	Titles	Seasons
Campeonato Catarinense Série C	1	2020

=== Runners-up ===
- Campeonato Catarinense Série B (1): 2022

== Notable players ==
- (Brazil) Sidão
