= Coffee King =

Brazilian informal agricultural title

Coffee King (Portuguese: Rei do Café) was an informal title created in Brazil during the 19th century and used until the early 20th century. It was usually applied to the biggest coffee producer of a given period.

In spite of the lack of consensus around the exact number of Coffee Kings, there are sources pointing to at least five of them:

- Joaquim José de Sousa Breves
- Henrique Dumont
- Francisco Schmidt
- Carlos Leôncio de Magalhães
- Geremia Lunardelli

== See also ==
- Agriculture in Brazil
- Coffee cycle
- Coffee production in Brazil
- Coffee with milk politics
- Economic history of Brazil
- Fazenda, Brazilian plantations
- Taubaté Agreement
