= Coffee production in Brazil =

Largest national coffee production in the world

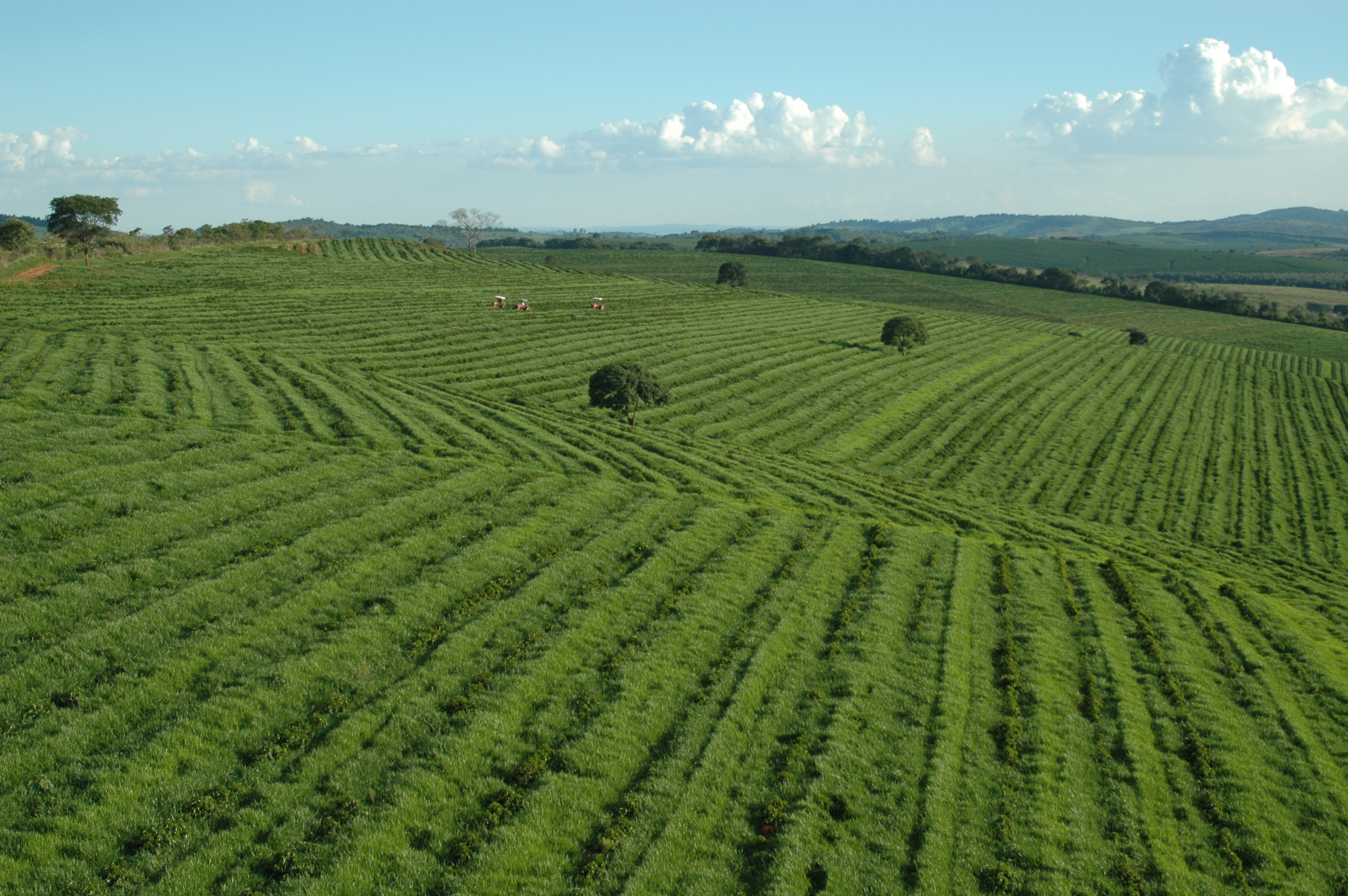
A coffee plantation in Santo Antônio do Amparo, Minas Gerais

Brazil produces about a third of the world's coffee, making the country by far the world's largest producer. Coffee plantations, covering some 27,000 km^{2} (10,000 sq mi), are mainly located in the southeastern states of Minas Gerais, São Paulo and Espírito Santo where the environment and climate provide ideal growing conditions.

Brazilian coffee prospered since the early 19th century, when immigrants came to work in the coffee plantations.

== History ==
Coffee was not native to the Americas but was imported to the country. The first crop arrived in Brazil in the 18th century making it the dominant producer by the 1840s. The first coffee bush in Brazil was planted by Francisco de Melo Palheta in Pará in 1727. According to legend, the Portuguese were looking for a cut of the coffee market, but could not obtain seeds from bordering French Guiana due to the governor's unwillingness to export the seeds. Palheta was sent to French Guiana on a diplomatic mission to resolve a border dispute. On his way back home, he managed to smuggle the seeds into Brazil by seducing the governor's wife who secretly gave him a bouquet spiked with seeds.

Share of major Brazilian exports of total exports 1821–1850 (%)
	Sugar	Cotton	Coffee	Others
1821–1830	30.1	20.6	18.4	30.9
1831–1840	24.0	10.8	43.8	21.4
1841–1850	26.7	7.5	41.4	24.4
Source: Bethell 1989, p. 86

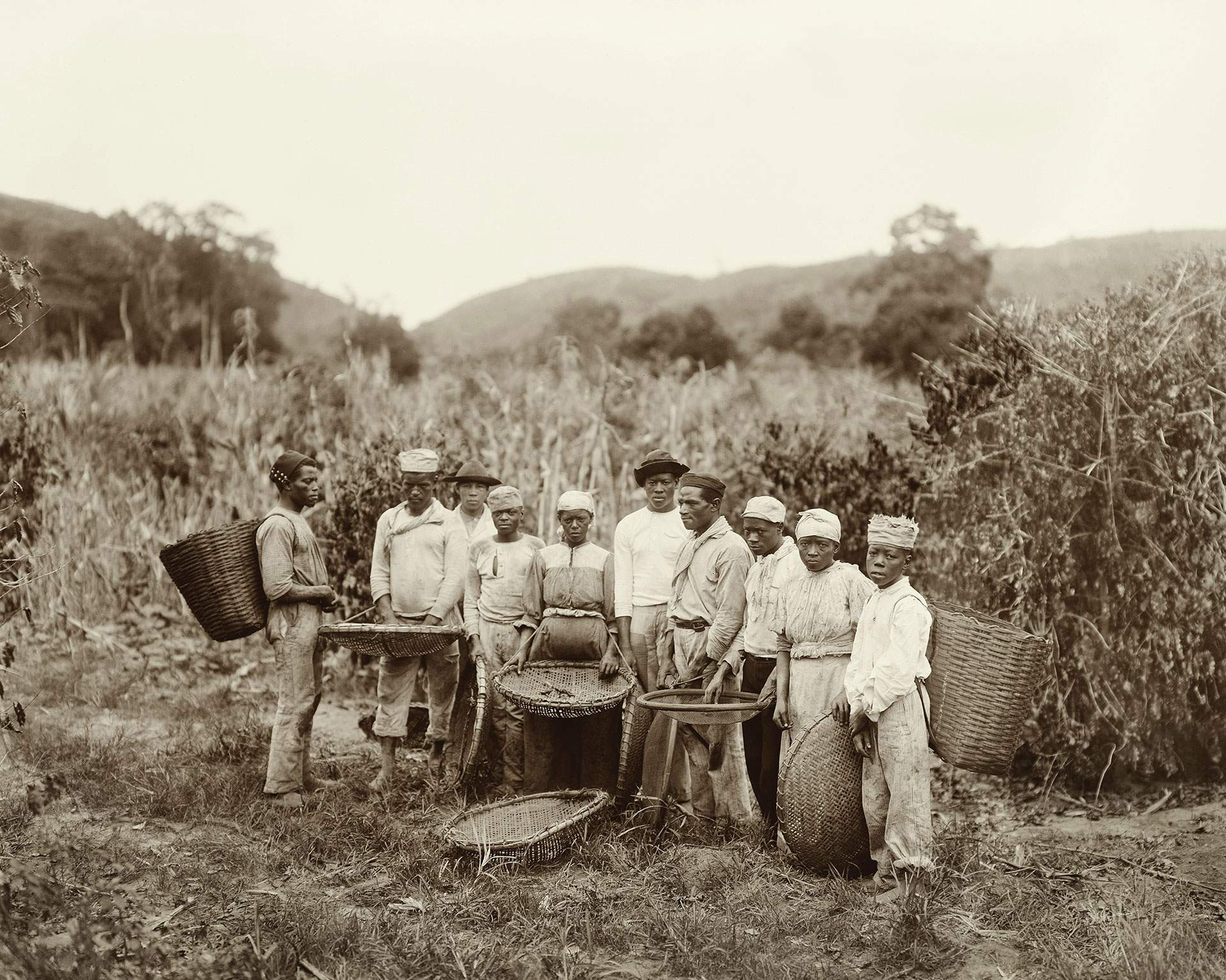
Enslaved African people working on a coffee plantation in Brazil, c.1882

Coffee spread from Pará and reached Rio de Janeiro in 1770, but was only produced for domestic consumption until the early 19th century when American and European demand increased, creating the first of two coffee booms. The cycle ran from the 1830s to 1850s, contributing to the decline of slavery and increased industrialization. Coffee plantations in Rio de Janeiro, São Paulo and Minas Gerais quickly grew in size in the 1820s, accounting for 20% of the world's production. By the 1830s, coffee had become Brazil's largest export and accounted for 30% of the world's production. In the 1840s, both the share of total exports and of world production reached 40%, making Brazil the largest coffee producer. The early coffee industry was dependent on slaves; in the first half of the 19th century 1.5 million slaves were imported to work on the plantations. When the foreign slave trade was outlawed in 1850, plantation owners began turning more and more to European immigrants to meet labor demands. However, the internal slave trade continued until slavery was finally abolished in Brazil in 1888.

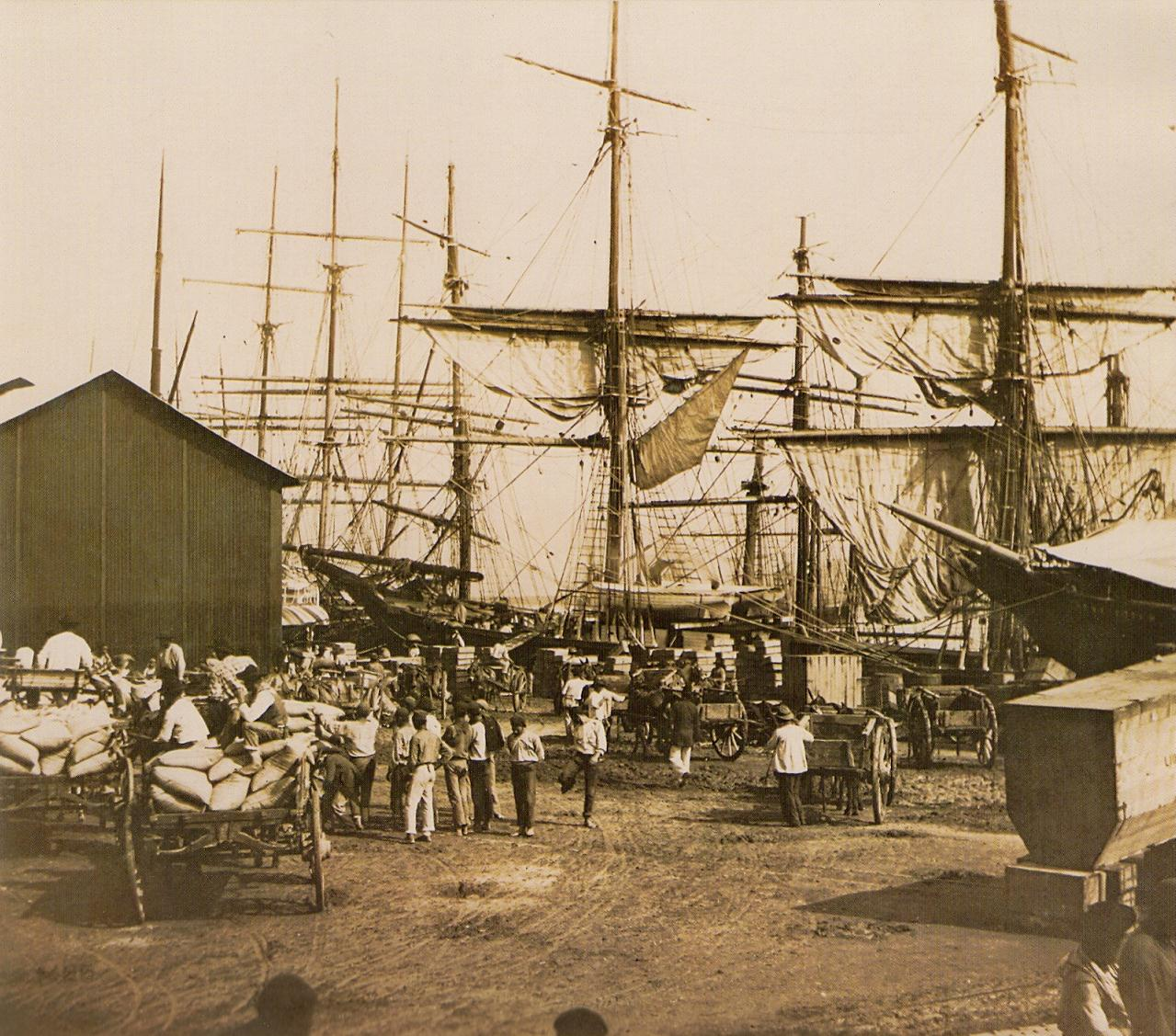
Coffee being embarked on the Port of Santos, São Paulo, 1880

The second boom ran from the 1880s to the 1930s, corresponding to a period in Brazilian politics called café com leite ("coffee with milk"). The name refers to the largest states' dominant industries: coffee in São Paulo and dairy in Minas Gerais. This period also saw the Brazilian government start the practice of valorization, a protectionist practice designed to stabilize the price of coffee.

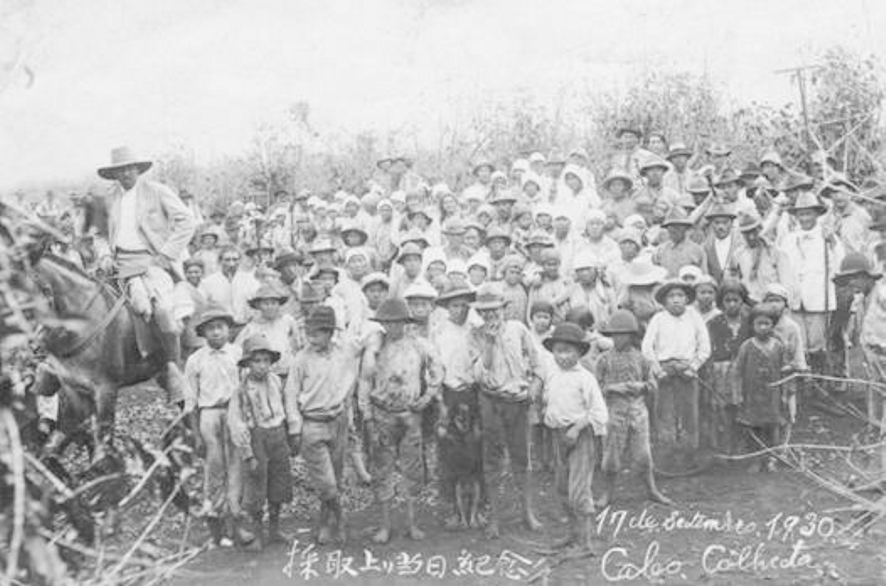
Japanese workers on a fazenda (farm), 1930.

The Zona da Mata Mineira district grew 90% of the coffee in Minas Gerais during the 1880s and 70% during the 1920s. Most of the workers were black men, with some being enslaved and some being free. Increasingly Italian, Spanish and Japanese immigrants provided the expanding labor force. A railway system was built to transport the coffee beans to market, but it also provided essential internal transportation for both freight and passengers, as well as to develop a large skilled labor force. The growing coffee industry attracted millions of immigrants and transformed São Paulo from a small town to the largest industrial center in the developing world. The city's population of 30,000 in the 1850s grew to 70,000 in 1890 and 240,000 by 1900. With one million inhabitants in the 1930s, São Paulo surpassed Rio de Janeiro as the country's largest city and most important industrial center.

By the early 20th century, coffee accounted for 16% of Brazil's gross national product, and three-fourths of its export earnings. Both growers and exporters played a major role in politics; however, historians debate whether or not they were indeed the most powerful actors in the political system. The February 1906 Taubaté Agreement is a clear example of the large political influence São Paulo wielded owing to its role in the coffee trade. Overproduction had decreased the price of coffee, and to protect the coffee industry – and the interests of the local coffee elite – the government was to control the price by buying abundant harvests and selling the beans on the international market at a better opportunity. The scheme sparked a temporary rise in the price and promoted the continued expansion of coffee production. The valorization scheme was successful from the perspective of the planters and the Brazilian state, but led to a global oversupply and increased the damages from the crash during the Great Depression in the 1930s.

In the 1920s, Brazil had a near monopoly of the international coffee market, supplying 80% of the world's coffee. Since the 1950s, the country's market share has steadily declined due to increased global production. Despite a falling share and attempts by the government to decrease the export sector's dependency on a single crop, coffee still accounted for 60% of Brazil's total exports as late as 1960.

=== Historiography ===
The first coffee economy in Brazil grew near São Paulo in the Santos coffee zone. North of São Paulo was the Paraíba Valley, this region was home to Oeste Paulista, a once hegemon of Brazilian coffee. This region and its economy only grew because of slave labor. While later on the industry largely invited immigrant populations to work in coffee. The coffee industry was already booming when slavery was abolished in 1888. This led the way for second slavery to exist, promoted by the Brazilian government and international European pressures to further expand the coffee economy. The politics and economics behind second slavery, have most certainly affected coffee production in Brazil. Historian Dale Tomich describes "The concept of the second slavery radically reinterprets the relation of slavery and capitalism by calling attention to the emergence of extensive new zones of slave commodity production in the US South, Cuba, and Brazil as part of nineteenth-century industrialization and world-economic expansion." Using this perspective on second slavery, it explains the coffee industry in Brazil today when tracing its origins in the 19th century. The abolition of slavery didn't necessarily change labor practices but nudged a change in labor history. This wave of second slavery, as the name suggests, may have abolished legal slavery, but it did not abolish harsh labor practices, nor did it abolish racism. The social history of Brazil was still a segregated society.

One of the most significant ways that second slavery in Brazil has impacted its social history, is the fact that it is connected to capitalism. The former slaves of São Paulo, were still the backbone of the coffee industry, catapulting Brazil to an elevated status of an industrializing nation. Even before the emancipation of slaves, several engravings and images from the early 19th century portray dark-skinned slaves working in coffee fields. As author Erik Mathisen argues, second slavery is connected to capitalism, much like slavery itself. And just like the U.S., by the 1880s in Brazil slavery limped on its traditional sense, but rich plantation owners disregarded the change in social status from slave to former slave, and retained its labor practices. Mathisen goes on to say: "Not only did Cuban sugar, Brazilian coffee, and American cotton become cash crops in high demand, but their production drew inspiration from new, brutal labor techniques, buoyed by new ideas about the scientific management of agriculture and labor…"

Much of the Brazilian coffee landscape has to do with its labor and social history. Second slavery has its roots in the sugar, cotton and coffee industry in the Americas. The sugar industry, much like the cotton industry up in Northern America, has a long and winding history. While sugar traveled far and wide throughout the Old World, the production ultimately fell to the Europeans in contemporary world history. This commodity shaped social, and labor history, as well as geography. Like cotton, this commodity yielded high profits and therefore the presence of capitalism was undeniable. As Dale Tomisch, in much of his works point out, sugar, cotton, and coffee, have forever changed the landscape on which people build their lives, as its history has seen the evolution of these sugar-based societies. Even with free labor, the ultimate goal for the state in the 19th century was economic expansion into the world economy; therefore, with free or unfree labor regimes, the state was still not committed to relieving the wrongs of slavery, but rather the growth of the economic state. With the context of second slavery in mind, when looking at these three major commodities, coffee, unlike sugar and cotton, became more prominent in 19th-century Brazil. The politics and economics behind second slavery have most certainly affected coffee production in Brazil.

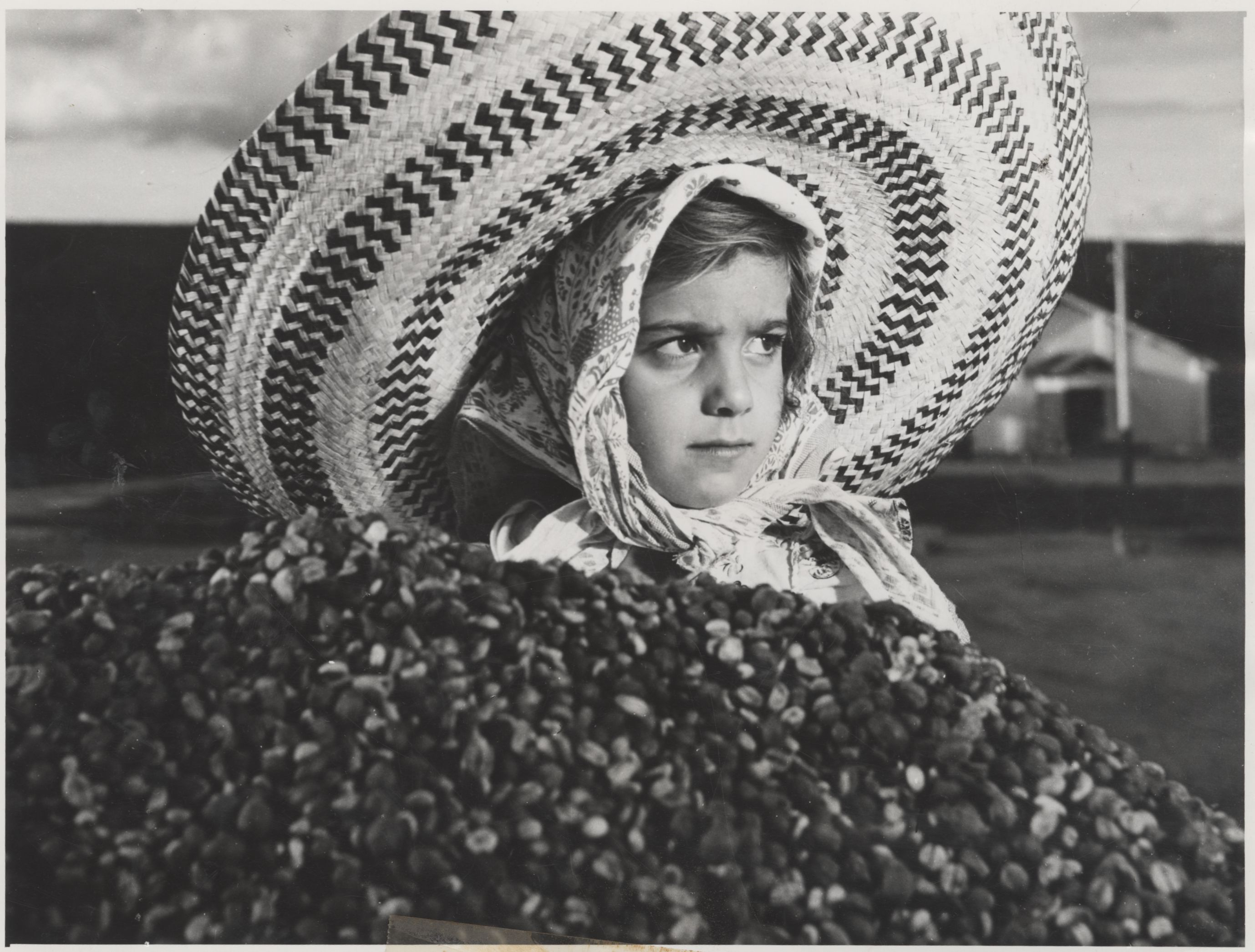
A young Brazilian farmer selecting the ripest coffee beans in 1961

Before the 1960s, historians generally ignored the coffee industry because it seemed too embarrassing. Coffee was not a major industry in the colonial period. In any one particular locality, the coffee industry flourished for a few decades and then moved on as the soil lost its fertility. This movement was called the Coffee Front and pushed deforestation westward. Due to this transience, coffee production was not deeply embedded in the history of any single locality. After independence, coffee plantations were associated with slavery, underdevelopment, and a political oligarchy, and not the modern development of state and society. Historians now recognize the importance of the industry, and there is a flourishing scholarly literature.

=== 1990s deregulations ===
Consumers' change in taste towards milder and higher quality coffee triggered a disagreement over export quotas of the International Coffee Agreement in the end of the 1980s. With the retained quotas from the 1983 agreement, the change increased the value of milder coffee at the expense of more traditional varieties. Brazil in particular refused to reduce its quotas believing it would lower their market share. The consumers, led by the United States, demanded higher coffee quality and the end of selling coffee to non-members at reduced rates. US officials criticized Brazil for not being willing to accept a reduction of the country's quotas despite falling share of the world market since 1980. Jorio Dauster, head of the state-controlled Brazilian Coffee Institute, believed Brazil could survive without help from the agreement. Not being able to reach an agreement in a timely manner, the agreement broke down in 1989. As a result, the Brazilian Coffee Institute, previously controlling the price of coffee by regulating the amount grown and sold, was abolished to limit government interference in favor of free markets. Up to this point the industry had simply neglected quality control management because government regulations favored scale economies, but now coffee processors began exploring higher quality segments in contrast to the traditionally lower quality.

== Production ==
=== Biggest coffee producers ===
The six Brazilian states with the largest acreage for coffee are Minas Gerais (1.22 million hectares); Espírito Santo (433,000 hectares); São Paulo (216,000 hectares); Bahia (171,000 hectares); Rondônia (95,000 hectares); and Paraná (49,000 hectares).

Brazil has been the world's largest producer of coffee for the last 150 years. This production peaked in the 1920s and declined since the 1950s due to global competition. Brazil is currently producing about a third of the world coffee. According to the Food and Agriculture Organization (FAO) and the United States Department of Agriculture (USDA), Brazil remains to date (2026) the world leader in production of green coffee, followed by Vietnam, Indonesia and Colombia. The country is unrivaled in total production of green coffee, arabica coffee and instant coffee. In 2011, total production was 2.7 million tonnes, more than twice the amount of Vietnam, the second largest producer. Some 3.5 million people are involved in the industry, mostly in rural areas.

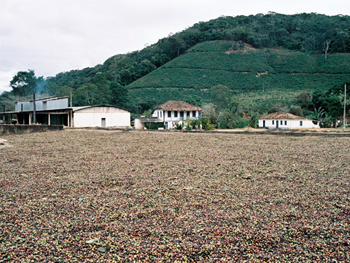
Coffee beans drying in the sun, Alto Jequitibá, Minas Gerais

=== Cultivation ===
There are about 220,000 coffee farms involved in the industry, with plantations covering about 27,000 km^{2} (10,000 sq mi) of the country.

Plantations are mainly located in the southeastern states of Minas Gerais, São Paulo and Paraná where the environment and climate provide ideal growing conditions. Minas Gerais alone accounts for about half of the country's production. Most plantations are harvested in the dry seasons of June through September, usually in one huge annual crop when most berries are ripe. In most countries, arabica beans are processed using the wet process (also called washed coffee), but virtually all coffee in Brazil is processed using the dry process (also called unwashed or natural coffee). The entire berries are cleaned and placed in the sun to dry for 8–10 days (or up to four weeks during unfavorable conditions). The outer layer of the dried berry is then removed in a hulling process before the beans are sorted, graded and packed in 60 kg bags.

==== Species ====
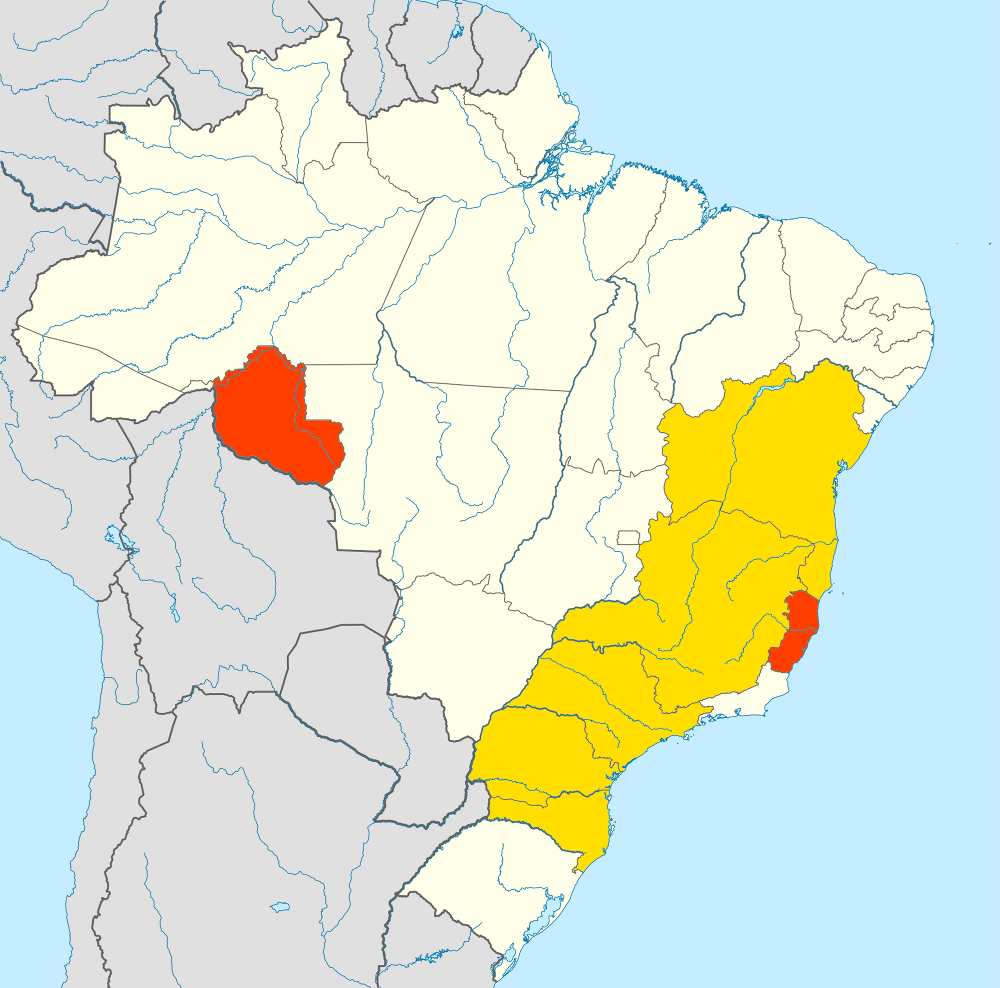
Map of Brazilian coffee growing regions Arabica Robusta Source: Souza 2008, p. 226

Several species in the coffee genus, Coffea, can be grown for their beans, but two species, arabica and robusta, account for virtually all production. Arabica dominates both Brazil and the world as a whole with about 70% of the production; robusta accounts for the remaining 30%. In Brazil, arabica production is located in the main coffee-growing cluster of states led by Minas Gerais where arabica is produced almost exclusively. Robusta is primarily grown in the southeastern much smaller state of Espírito Santo where about 80% of the coffee is robusta. More recently, the northwestern state of Rondônia entered the market and produces large shares of robusta.

==== Frost ====
The coffee plant can tolerate low temperatures, but not frost. Milder frosts, called "white frosts", kill the flowers that grow into the harvested cherries, but new flowers are regrown by the tree the next season. White frosts only affect the following year's harvest, but more severe frosts, "black frosts", kill the entire tree and have more long-term consequences. New plants have to be planted after a black frost, and it takes years before the tree begins to bear fruit, typically 3–4 years. Brazil is the only major producer vulnerable to frost, and harsh frosts may drive up the world price of coffee due to Brazil's large share of the market. Frosts of this severity affect harvests every five or six years, causing volatility on the market. (Note: See "Frosts And Droughts In Coffee Areas In Brazil " on ICO's website for a full list of frosts and droughts)

==== Black frost of 1975 ====
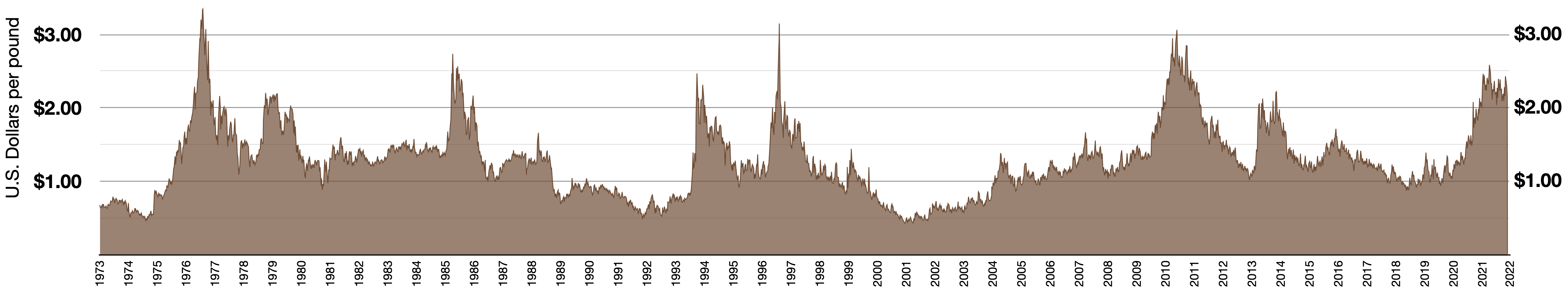
Coffee prices 1973 - 2022

The devastating black frost of 1975 struck on 18 July, hitting hardest in Paraná, Minas Gerais and São Paulo. The immediately following 1975–76 harvest was not severely affected as two-thirds of the harvest was already completed, but the 1976–77 harvest was hit harder with 73.5% of the crops affected. The price of coffee doubled in 1976–1977 and did not fall again until the successful harvest in August 1977. The last severe frost took place in 1994 when two particularly harsh frosts hit in June and July in the span of two weeks. While not as severe as in 1975, the frosts reduced the following year's harvest by 50–80% some states like São Paulo and Paraná and raised worldwide prices the following years.

=== Processing industry ===
The processing industry is divided in two distinct groups, ground/roasted coffee and instant coffee. The ground/roasted coffee market is highly competitive and had over 1,000 companies in 2001. In contrast, the instant coffee market is highly concentrated with four major firms accounting for 75% of the market. Brazil is the world's largest exporter of instant coffee, with instant coffee constituting 10–20% of total coffee exports. Both types of coffee are mainly exported to the US, the world's largest coffee consumer.

== Export ==
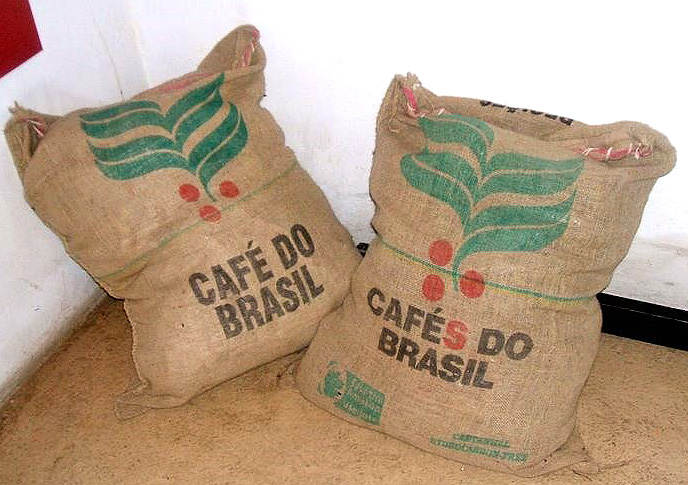
Bags of coffee in São Paulo

Coffee remains an important export, but its importance has declined in the last 50 years. Coffee exports as a percentage of total exports was over 50% between the 1850s and 1960s, peaking in 1950 with 63.9%. The percentage began to decline in the 1960s when other export-heavy sectors expanded. By 1980, coffee exports were down to 12.3% and by 2006 accounted for only 2.5%. Brazil itself is the largest consumer of coffee, surpassing the United States in the mid-2010s. Per capita, Brazil is the 14th largest consumer and, along with Ethiopia, the only major coffee producer with a sizeable domestic consumption.

=== Tariffs ===
There are no taxes on coffee exports from Brazil, but importing green and roasted coffee into the country is taxed by 10% and soluble coffee by 16%. Unprocessed coffee can be exported duty-free into the three largest markets: the United States, the European Union and Japan, but processed coffee such as roasted beans, instant coffee and decaffeinated coffee is taxed 7.5% into the EU and 10% into Japan. Exports to the United States are tariff-free.

== See also ==
- Coffee cycle, period of Brazil's economic history
- Coffee King
- Agriculture in Brazil
- Coffee with milk politics
- Economic history of Brazil
- Fazenda, Brazilian plantations
- Casa-grande
- "The Coffee Song" (also known as "They've Got an Awful Lot of Coffee in Brazil")
- List of countries by coffee production
