= SS Magellan =

SS Magellan is the name of the following ships:

- SS Magellan (1893), sunk by SM UB-50 on 25 July 1918
- SS Magellan (1897), sunk by SM U-63 on 11 December 1916

== See also ==
- Magellan (disambiguation)
- MS Magellan
