= Clube Atlético Itajaí =

CA Itajaí
- Full name: Clube Atlético Itajaí
- Founded: 20 April 2016
- Dissolved: 24 April 2023; 2 years ago
- Ground: Estádio Hercílio Luz
- Capacity: 6,000
- President: William Santos
| Home colors | Away colors |

Clube Atlético Itajaí was a Brazilian football club based in Itajaí, Santa Catarina.

== History ==
Founded on 20 April 2016 by Fabio Bartelt, the club won the Santa Catarina Série C title in its debut year. In 2017, the year in which he won the right to compete in Série B, withrew from the dispute, returning in 2018 again at the third level, where the club played for the next five seasons. In 2023, the extinction of the team was announced, then chaired by William Santos, who was facing health problems.

== Appearances ==
Following is the summary of CA Itajaí appearances in Campeonato Catarinense.

| Season | Division | Final position |
|---|---|---|
| 2016 | 3rd | 1st |
| 2017 | Did not play | |
| 2018 | 3rd | 2nd |
| 2019 | 3rd | 2nd |
| 2020 | 3rd | 4th |
| 2021 | 3rd | 3rd |
| 2022 | 3rd | 4th |

== Honours ==
=== Official tournaments ===
State
| Competitions | Titles | Seasons |
|---|---|---|
| Campeonato Catarinense Série C | 1 | 2016 |

=== Runners-up ===
- Campeonato Catarinense Série C (2): 2018, 2019
