= Taubaté Agreement =

1906 treaty

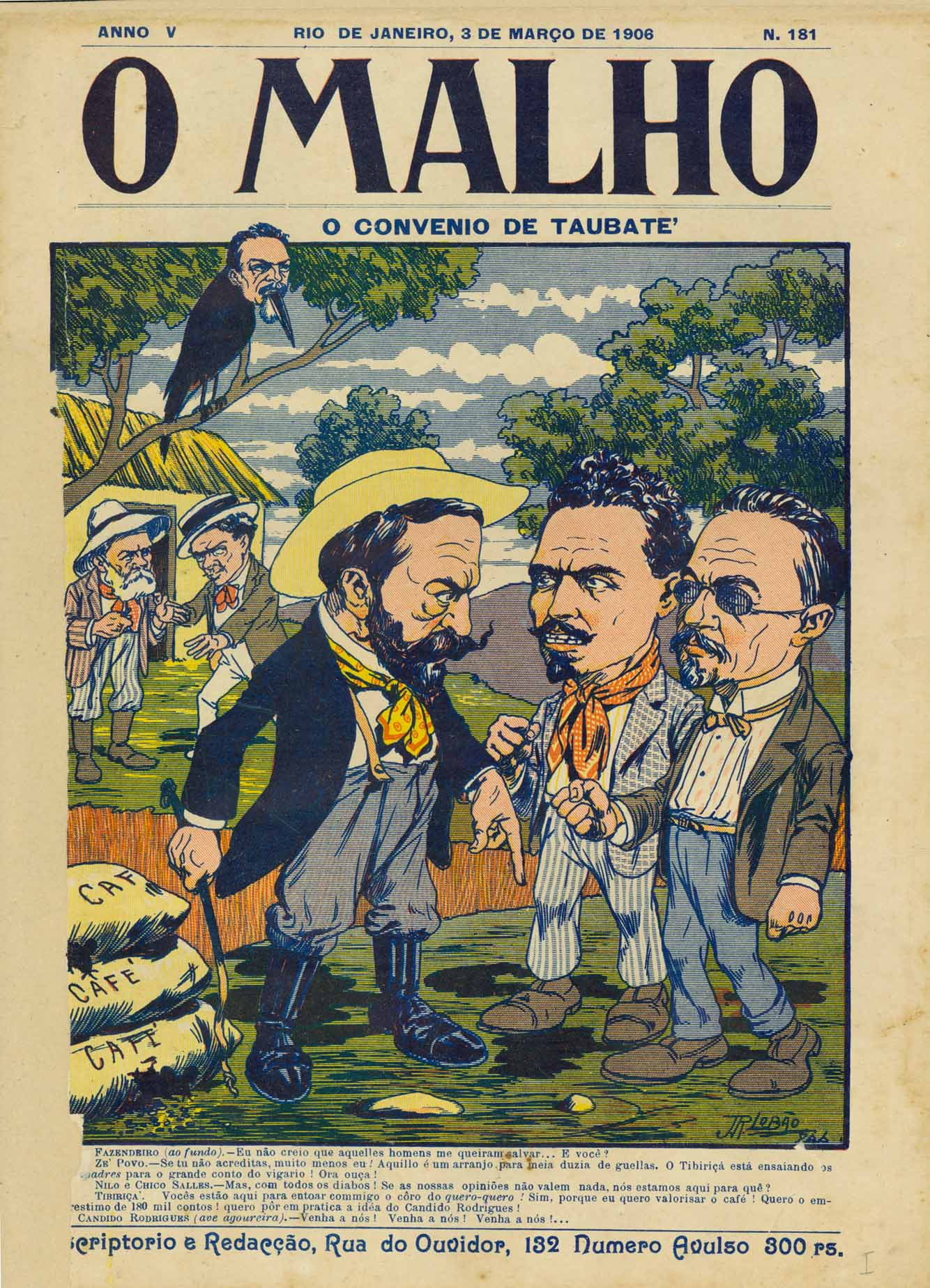
Cover of the O Malho magazine satirizing the Taubaté Agreement, 3 March 1906

The Taubaté Agreement (Portuguese: Convênio de Taubaté), was an agreement signed on 26 February 1906 during the First Brazilian Republic between the presidents of the states of Minas Gerais (Francisco Antônio de Sales), São Paulo (Jorge Tibiriçá) and Rio de Janeiro (Nilo Peçanha), the main producers of coffee in Brazil. Foreseeing the harvest of a record crop, the agreement was signed in order to artificially maintain the high prices of coffee. Based on the principles of the Governors' Policy, an intervention by the Federal government of Brazil was agreed for the benefit of the coffee growers in certain regions of the country.

The agreement established minimum prices for the purchase of surplus coffee production by governments, that the export of inferior types of coffee was to be discouraged, the improvement of the advertising of Brazilian coffee abroad, the stimulation of domestic consumption and the restrictment of the expansion of coffee crops. Purchases would be financed by issues backed by external loans. In addition, the federal government was committed to the creation of the Caixa de Conversão in order to stabilize the exchange rate, and thus, the income of coffee growers in domestic currency. The agreement started the first coffee price defense operation, which was made up of a policy of valuing the product and another of stabilizing the exchange rate.

== Background ==
Coffee production in Brazil was established in the 1820s. Initially, coffee plantations spread through the fertile Paraíba Valley in Rio de Janeiro and São Paulo. Continuing its ascending march, there was an expansion of coffee production in the province of Minas Gerais (Zona da Mata and the south of the province), at the same time that production was consolidated in the interior of São Paulo. The last 20 years of the Empire of Brazil saw an accentuated development of coffee growing in the so-called "Oeste Paulista" (Western São Paulo), up until that point an almost deserted region and whose vacant lands were quickly invaded by the new culture. The inauguration of railroads such as the São Paulo Railway Company in 1867, which crossed the Serra do Mar, connecting the coffee growing areas in the interior of São Paulo to the Port of Santos, and the abundance of cheap workforce, a result of the great immigration wave to Brazil at the end of the 19th century, largely contributed to the expansion of the coffee economy.

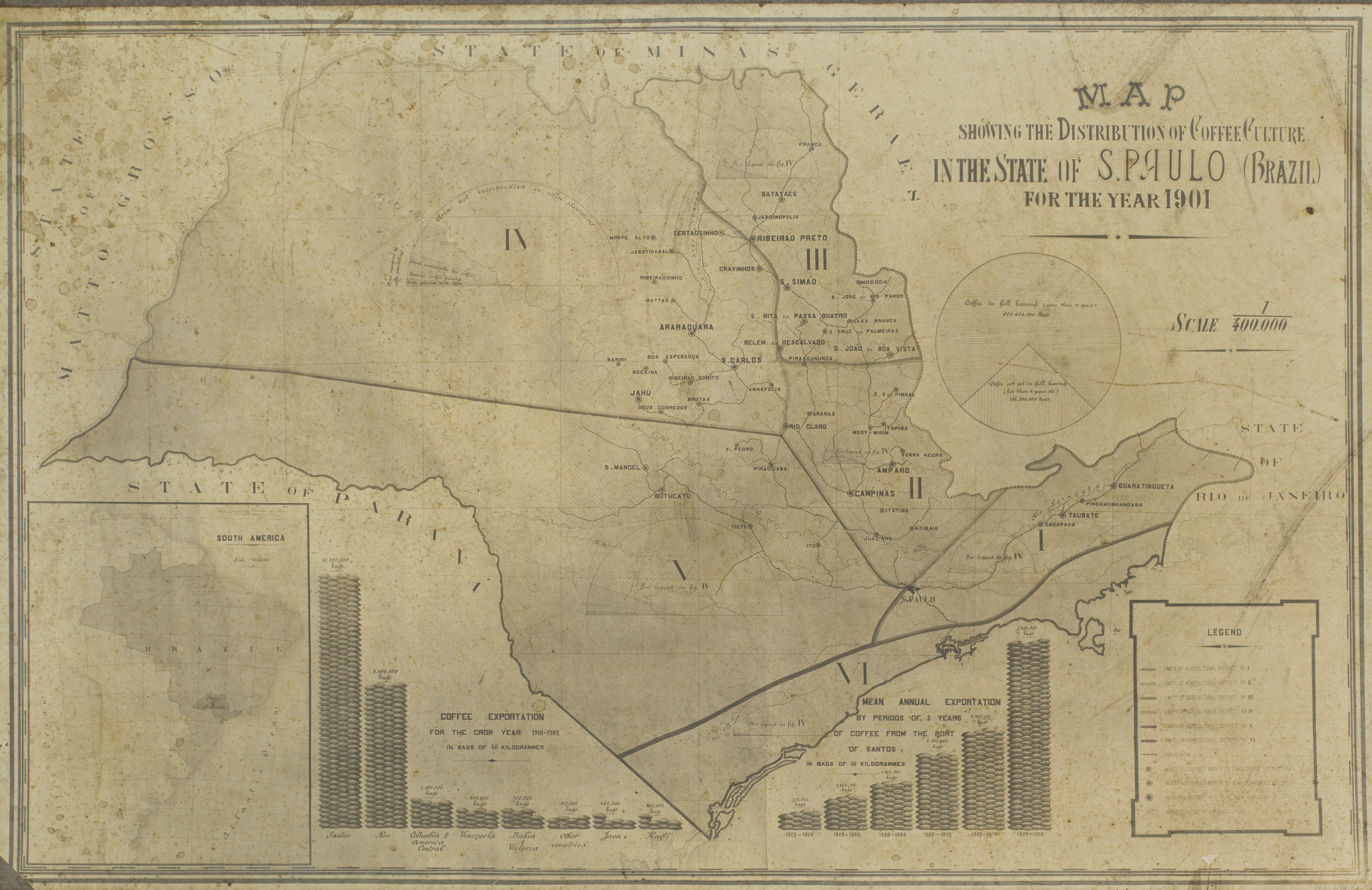
Illustrative map of the distribution of coffee in the state of São Paulo in 1901

In 1886, a period defined by an expressive increase in coffee prices began. The beginning of this cycle was marked by other movements that occurred at the same time: there was a strong growth in foreign demand, (Note: The international demand for coffee grew 3.1% a year from 1882 to 1905.) while the supply grew at an increasing yet irregular rhythm due to climatic conditions, the more or less appropriate treatment given to the plantantions and the fact that periods of great production were followed by a transitional period of plant exhaustion, which largely stimulated speculation. Due to the expansion of demand and the dynamics of supply, the international price of coffee doubled between 1885 and 1890, further stimulating the expansion of coffee plantations. The large expansion of production and other activities related to coffee, on the one hand, brought some wealth and progress to the country, but, on the other hand, resulted in overproduction which caused the fall of prices. Initially, the effects of this fall were mitigated by the devaluation of the Brazilian currency.

At the beginning of the 20th century, the overproduction crisis began to take shape. Coffee prices on the international market dropped significantly, prompting the mobilization of planters, who came together to create a strategy that would keep the price of the product valued in times of crisis. Since the Panic of 1893, which particularly affected the United States, the main buyer of Brazilian coffee, the price of coffee fell significantly. Brazilian intervention in the international level of coffee prices was only possible thanks to its dominance in international production, as the country controlled alone three quarters of the entire world supply.

== The agreement ==
In February 1906, the governors of the states of Minas Gerais (Francisco Antônio de Sales), São Paulo (Jorge Tibiriçá Piratininga) and Rio de Janeiro (Nilo Procópio Peçanha, later replaced by Alfredo Backer), met in Taubaté and as a result, on the ninth day of that month, signed an agreement that laid the foundations for a joint policy to value coffee, subject to approval by the President of the Republic.

Earlier proposals for federal intervention in the coffee market had already been made, notably by Alessandro Vincenzo Siciliano, an Italian-born Brazilian coffee grower and industrialist, in 1903. However, president Rodrigues Alves was reluctant to intervene, due to his liberal and austerity policies. The coffee valorization policy was then carried out by his successor, Afonso Pena.

Celso Furtado, in his work Formação Econômica do Brasil, summarized the measures as follows:

- In order to establish a balance between supply and demand, the federal government would intervene in the market, buying surpluses from coffee growers;
- The surpluses acquisitions would be financed through the use of capital obtained from loans abroad;
- The amortization and interest on these loans would be effected through a new tax levied in gold on each sack of coffee exported;
- In order to solve the problem of excess production in the medium and long term, the governors of coffee producing states would adopt measures aimed at discouraging the expansion of crops by coffee growers.

As a result, coffee prices were kept artificially high, guaranteeing coffee growers' profits. These, instead of reducing coffee production, continued to produce it on a large scale, forcing the government to contract more loans to continue acquiring the surpluses. The State acquired the product for resale in more favorable moments until 1924, the year in which the Coffee Institute of São Paulo was created, from when the intervention started to take place indirectly.

== Consequences ==
Also according to Celso Furtado, the biggest flaw of this policy of artificial valorization of coffee was that the government did not encourage the diversification of Brazilian exports, through subsidies, in order to alleviate the pressure of domestic supply on the trend of falling prices observed. However, he himself agrees that such governmental action would be very difficult because it did not correspond to the prevailing political interests at the time, linked to the export of coffee. The Taubaté Agreement only helped to postpone the imminent end of the coffee cycle in Brazil, which happened with the crash of the New York Stock Exchange in 1929. The Taubaté Agreement was used to enrich coffee owners, who invested in the industrialization of São Paulo, since the production had guaranteed sales. With the impossibility of paying the debts that the São Paulo government contracted abroad after the 1929 crisis, Getúlio Vargas' government assumed all debts by nationalizing them in 1930.

== See also ==
- Coffee King
- Coffee production in Brazil
- Coffee with milk politics
