= Júnior Brandão =

Brazilian footballer

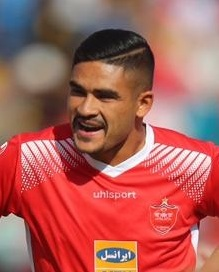
- Brandão in a pre-match training with Persepolis

Personal information
- Full name: José Brandão Gonçalves Júnior
- Date of birth: 7 January 1995 (age 31)
- Place of birth: Ibiúna, Brazil
- Height: 1.87 m (6 ft 2 in)
- Position: Forward

Team information
- Current team: The Cong-Viettel
- Number: 97

Youth career
- Grêmio Osasco
- 2015: Taboão da Serra

Senior career*
Years	Team	Apps	(Gls)
2015	Juventus de Seara	13	(10)
2015	Ypiranga	3	(0)
2016	Boa Esporte	3	(0)
2016	Ferroviária	1	(0)
2017	Novo Hamburgo	6	(0)
2017	Primavera	1	(0)
2018	Iporá	14	(4)
2018	Atlético Goianiense	18	(9)
2018	Ludogorets Razgrad II	6	(4)
2018–2022	Ludogorets Razgrad	0	(0)
2019	→ Goiás (loan)	20	(2)
2019	→ Persepolis (loan)	5	(0)
2020	→ Atlético Goianiense (loan)	15	(1)
2021	→ Rio Ave II (loan)	1	(0)
2021	→ Rio Ave (loan)	10	(0)
2021	→ CRB (loan)	22	(3)
2022	Operário	29	(3)
2023–2024	Madura United	20	(9)
2023–2024	→ Bhayangkara (loan)	10	(7)
2025	Malut United	11	(2)
2025	Guarani	5	(0)
2026	Madura United	14	(8)
2026–	The Cong-Viettel	1	(0)
- * Club domestic league appearances and goals as of 8 October 2026

José Brandão Gonçalves Júnior (born 7 January 1995), known as Júnior Brandão, is a Brazilian professional footballer who plays as a forward for V.League 1 club The Cong-Viettel.

== Club career ==
=== Early career ===
Born in Ibiúna, São Paulo, Brandão finished his formation with Taboão da Serra. In May 2015, after representing CATS in the 2015 Copa São Paulo de Futebol Júnior, he joined Juventus de Seara in the Campeonato Catarinense Série B.

Brandão made his senior debut on 28 June 2015, playing the last 19 minutes in a 1–1 home draw against Atlético Tubarão. He scored his first goals seven days later, netting a brace in a 9–0 home routing of Blumenau. On 29 July, he scored a hat-trick in a 3–2 home win against Operário de Mafra.

On 23 September 2015, Brandão signed for Série D side Ypiranga-RS, and featured rarely as his side achieved promotion to Série C.

Júnior Brandão played for Boa Esporte and Ferroviária during the 2016 campaign, both featuring sparingly. On 8 December of that year he agreed to a contract with Novo Hamburgo for the ensuing Campeonato Gaúcho, and contributed with one goal in only two matches as his side lifted the trophy.

On 11 August 2017, Brandão moved to Primavera, but his side was knocked out of the Campeonato Paulista Segunda Divisão just two matches after his arrival. In December, he signed for Iporá.

=== Atlético Goianiense ===
On 5 April 2018, Brandão was presented at Atlético Goianiense in Série B. He made his debut for the club on 14 April, coming on as a substitute in a 3–2 home win against Criciúma.

Brandão scored his first goals for Dragão on 25 May 2018, netting a brace in a 2–2 home draw against Oeste. On 11 June, he extended his contract until the end of 2020.

=== Ludogorets Razgrad ===
On 22 August 2018, Brandão was transferred to PFC Ludogorets Razgrad.

==== Loan to Goiás ====
On 3 January 2019 he returned in Brazil joining Série A team Goiás on loan until end of the year.

==== Loan to Persepolis ====
On 19 August 2019, Júnior Brandão signed a one-year loan contract with Persian Gulf Pro League champions Persepolis. On 28 November 2019, his contract with Persepolis was terminated due to poor performance.

==== Loan to Atlético Goianiense ====
On 21 February 2020, Brandão returned to Brazilian club Atlético Goianiense on a loan deal until the end of the season.

==== Loan to Rio Ave ====
On February 1, 2021, Brandão moved to Primeira Liga side Rio Ave, on a loan deal for the remainder of the season.

=== The Cong-Viettel ===
On 21 August 2026, Brandão joined V.League 1 side The Cong-Viettel.

== Career statistics ==
As of 23 May 2026

Club	Season	League			State League		Cup		Continental		Other		Total	
Club	Season	Division	Apps	Goals	Apps	Goals	Apps	Goals	Apps	Goals	Apps	Goals	Apps	Goals
Juventus-SC	2015	Catarinense Série B	—		13	10	—		—		—		13	10
Ypiranga-RS	2015	Série D	3	0	—		—		—		—		3	0
Boa Esporte	2016	Série C	0	0	3	0	—		—		—		3	0
Ferroviária	2016	Paulista	—		—		—		—		5 (Note: Appearance(s) in Copa Paulista)	1	5	1
Novo Hamburgo	2017	Série D	6	0	2	1	—		—		—		8	1
Primavera	2017	Paulista 2ª Divisão	—		1	0	—		—		—		1	0
Iporá	2018	Série D	0	0	14	4	—		—		—		14	4
Atlético Goianiense	2018	Série B	18	9	—		0	0	—		—		18	9
Ludogorets Razgrad	2018–19	First League	0	0	—		0	0	2 (Note: Appearance(s) in UEFA Europa League)	0	0	0	2	0
Ludogorets Razgrad II	2018–19	Second League	6	4	—		—		—		—		6	4
Goiás (loan)	2019	Série A	6	0	14	2	2	0	—		—		22	2
Persepolis (loan)	2019–20	Persian Gulf Pro League	5	0	—		1	0	—		—		6	0
Atlético Goianiense (loan)	2020	Série A	11	0	4	1	5	1	—		—		21	2
Rio Ave II (loan)	2020–21	Campeonato de Portugal	1	0	—		—		—		—		1	0
Rio Ave (loan)	2020–21	Primeira Liga	10	0	—		0	0	—		—		10	0
Regatas Brasil (loan)	2021	Série B	19	3	1	0	0	0	—		—		20	3
Operário	2022	Série B	29	3	0	0	0	0	—		—		29	3
Madura United	2023–24	Liga 1	20	9	0	0	0	0	—		—		20	9
Bhayangkara (loan)	2023–24	Liga 1	10	7	—		0	0	—		—		10	7
Malut United	2024–25	Liga 1	11	2	—		0	0	—		—		11	2
Guarani	2025	Série C	5	0	0	0	0	0	—		—		5	0
Madura United	2025–26	Super League	14	8	—		0	0	—		—		14	8
Career total			174	45	52	18	8	1	2	0	5	1	242	65

== Honours ==
Club

- Campeonato Gaúcho: 2017

Individual

- Liga 1 Player of the Month: December 2023
