= Irineópolis =

Coordinates: 26.2386°S 50.7997°W

- Municipality
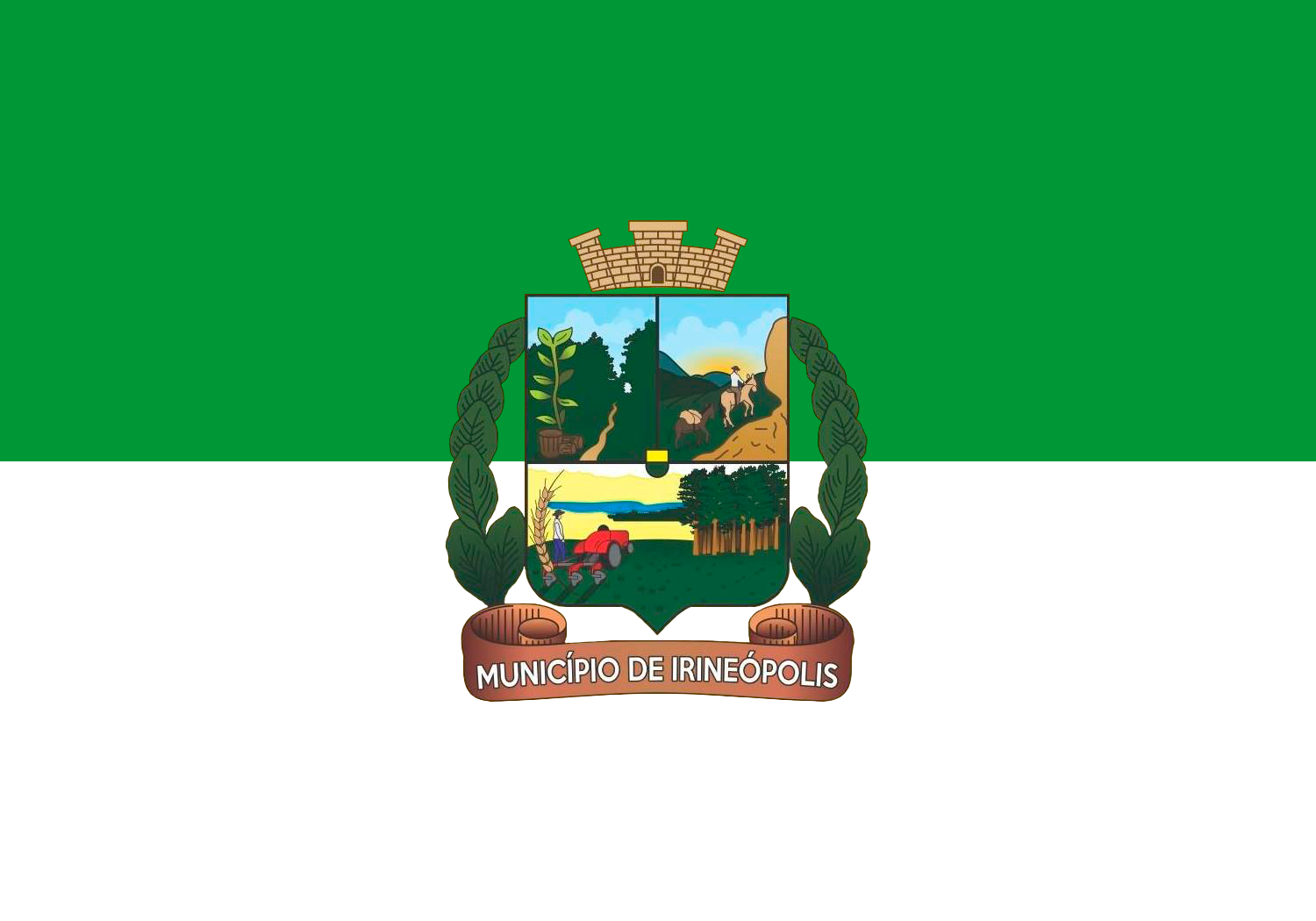
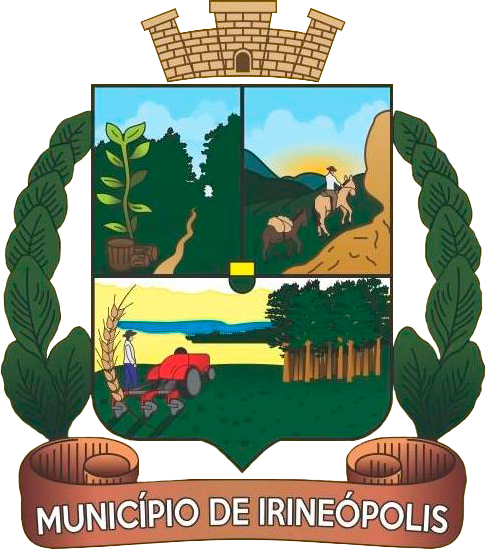
- Flag Coat of arms
- Interactive map of Irineópolis
- Country: Brazil
- Region: South
- State: Santa Catarina
- Mesoregion: Norte Catarinense

Population (2020)
  - Total: 11,289
- Time zone: UTC -3
- Website: www.irineopolis.sc.gov.br

Irineópolis is a municipality in the state of Santa Catarina in the South region of Brazil.

== Climate ==
Climate data for Irineópolis, elevation 777 m (2,549 ft), (1976–2005)
Month	Jan	Feb	Mar	Apr	May	Jun	Jul	Aug	Sep	Oct	Nov	Dec	Year
Mean daily maximum °C (°F)	28.0 (82.4)	27.9 (82.2)	26.7 (80.1)	23.5 (74.3)	20.7 (69.3)	18.9 (66.0)	18.9 (66.0)	20.6 (69.1)	21.7 (71.1)	23.8 (74.8)	26.0 (78.8)	27.2 (81.0)	23.7 (74.6)
Daily mean °C (°F)	20.9 (69.6)	20.7 (69.3)	19.6 (67.3)	16.3 (61.3)	13.5 (56.3)	11.6 (52.9)	11.3 (52.3)	12.8 (55.0)	14.7 (58.5)	16.8 (62.2)	18.6 (65.5)	20.1 (68.2)	16.4 (61.5)
Mean daily minimum °C (°F)	15.6 (60.1)	15.7 (60.3)	14.6 (58.3)	10.9 (51.6)	7.5 (45.5)	5.8 (42.4)	5.2 (41.4)	6.3 (43.3)	9.0 (48.2)	11.6 (52.9)	12.6 (54.7)	14.2 (57.6)	10.7 (51.4)
Average precipitation mm (inches)	183.0 (7.20)	158.0 (6.22)	117.0 (4.61)	77.0 (3.03)	101.0 (3.98)	102.0 (4.02)	85.0 (3.35)	77.0 (3.03)	146.0 (5.75)	165.0 (6.50)	126.0 (4.96)	147.0 (5.79)	1,484 (58.44)
Average relative humidity (%)	80	82	82	83	85	86	84	81	80	79	77	77	81
Mean monthly sunshine hours	157	153	160	131	128	142	134	140	79	100	192	160	1,676
Source 1: Empresa Brasileira de Pesquisa Agropecuária (EMBRAPA)
Source 2: Climatempo (precipitation)

== See also ==
- List of municipalities in Santa Catarina
