= Esporte Clube Internacional (SC) =

Internacional de Lages
- Full name: Esporte Clube Internacional
- Nicknames: Colorado Lageano; Vermelhão do Copacabana
- Founded: June 13, 1949 (77 years ago)
- Ground: Estádio Vidal Ramos Júnior, Lages, Santa Catarina state, Brazil
- Capacity: 9,600
- President: Cristopher Nunes
- Head coach: Beto Portella
- League: Campeonato Catarinense Série C
- 2025: Catarinense Série B, withdrew (relegated)
- Website: www.interdelages.com.br
Home colors	Away colors

Esporte Clube Internacional, commonly known as Internacional de Lages or Inter de Lages, is a Brazilian football team based in Lages, Santa Catarina state. In 2021, it plays Campeonato Catarinense Série B, the state of Santa Catarina's second league.

== History ==
The club was founded on June 13, 1949. It won the Campeonato Catarinense in 1965, the Campeonato Catarinense Second Level in 1990, 2000 and 2014 and the Campeonato Catarinense Third Level in 2013. Inter de Lages played the Taça Brasil in 1966, when it was eliminated in the first stage by Ferroviário-PR. The club returned to the national competitions in 2015, when it played the Campeonato Brasileiro Série D, the fourth tier of the Brazilian football.

== 2021 squad ==
Note: Flags indicate national team as defined under FIFA eligibility rules; some limited exceptions apply. Players may hold more than one non-FIFA nationality.

No.	Pos.	Nation	Player
—	GK	BRA	Diego
—	GK	BRA	Maciel
—	DF	BRA	Max
—	DF	BRA	Diego Chiclete
—	DF	BRA	Zé Vitor
—	DF	BRA	Fábio
—	DF	BRA	Pavani
—	DF	BRA	Marcelinho
—	DF	BRA	Railan
—	DF	BRA	Paulo Henrique
—	DF	BRA	Samuel Balbino
—	MF	BRA	Rudnei
—	MF	BRA	Renilson
—	MF	BRA	Calebe
—	MF	BRA	Ítalo
—	MF	BRA	Lucas Crispim
—	MF	BRA	Leozídio
—	MF	BRA	Cristiano
—	FW	BRA	Gustavo
—	FW	BRA	Michel Potiguar
—	FW	BRA	Wallace
—	FW	BRA	Gabriel Pelé
—	FW	BRA	Fabrício
—	FW	BRA	Christian

=== Staff ===
Coaching staff
Head coach	Beto Portella
Assistant coach	
Head athletic trainer	Walter Martinho
Goalkeeper coach	Márcio Amaral
Physiotherapist	Betinho Souza
Wardrobe keeper	
Football coordinator	Nasareno Silva

== Honours ==
=== Official tournaments ===
State
Competitions	Titles	Seasons
Campeonato Catarinense	1	1965
Campeonato Catarinense Série B	3^{s}	1990, 2000, 2014
Campeonato Catarinense Série C	2	2013, 2026

- record
- ^{S} shared record

=== Others tournaments ===
==== City ====
- Campeonato da Cidade de Lages (2): 1959, 1960

=== Runners-up ===
- Campeonato Catarinense (2): 1964, 1974
- Copa Santa Catarina (1): 1992
- Campeonato Catarinense Série B (2): 1989, 2023

== Stadium ==
Esporte Clube Internacional plays its home games at Estádio Vidal Ramos Júnior. The stadium used to have a maximum capacity of 11,800 people, but, following new security patterns, its capacity was lowered to 9,600 people.
