= Magallanes (surname) =

Magallanes is a surname. Notable people with the surname include:

- Adelfo Magallanes (1910–1988), Peruvian footballer
- Alex Magallanes Sr. (born 1974), Peruvian footballer
- Alex Magallanes Jr. (born 1997), Peruvian footballer
- Bobby Magallanes (born 1969), American minor league baseball manager
- Cristóbal Magallanes (1869–1927), Mexican saint
- Diego Magallanes (born 197), Argentine footballer
- Hugo Magallanes (born 1997), Uruguayan footballer
- Julián Magallanes (born 1986), Argentine footballer
- Nicholas Magallanes (1919–1977), former New York City Ballet principal dancer
- Pedro Magallanes (born 1956), Argentine footballer
- Piero Magallanes (born 2001), Peruvian footballer
