= Second Slavery =

Second Slavery is a term used to describe the form of cultural and economic bondage inflicted on the black population of the colonial America's during and following the wave of abolition brought on by the Haitian revolution and the British global abolition of the Atlantic slave trade. This new form of slavery was the offspring of the rise in geographical and economic expansion brought by capitalism which transformed the new slavery into a form of capitalism.

== Key concepts ==
This term is centralized around three main areas in the Americas: Brazil, Cuba, and the United States, since these are areas where the region's economics heavily rely on large populations of black slave labor. In a paper written by Klas Rönnbäck in 2010 for the Review Journal, a common perspective to view second slavery was the growing demand for European markets and its connection to the slave demand in these area, highlighting "the demand for plantation produce such as sugar, coffee, and cotton in this peripheral market had grown to such an extent by the middle of the nineteenth century that the production of these goods required the annual labor of some 190,000." And the factors of mainland vs. island areas is what lead these three areas to be some if not the most productive of their exports by slaves. Mainland Spanish America's ties to a lower/less significant slave population as the political changes coming from independence and abolition is what scholars ultimately argue excluded them from the second slavery argument in places like Cuba. Because of this, scholars have argued its levels of significance to the ties of capitalism, some coming to the conclusion that this evolution of slavery is in itself capitalism.

=== Cuba ===
With the second largest population of African imported slaves going to Cuba, by the mid 19th century, it became the largest sugar producer in the world. The expansion of land through industrialization brought Cuba to the forefront of sugar production, surpassing British Guiana, and with access to rail roads, it was able to double its production every ten years between 1830 and 1860. The plantations grew rice as well as sugar as a dual staple production that could feed their enslaved populations and profit with mass production.

=== Brazil ===
With the greatest concentration of enslaved shipments and African diaspora following the global close of the Atlantic slave trade in the mid-1800s, Brazil also rose to the top of the global exports of coffee, eventually making it the main export of the country. These coffee berries were picked by hand but the innovation and efficiency of the fazenda allowed for a growth in production. Producing dietary staples like corn, mandioca, beef, and rice for their slaves was a method practiced by Brazilian plantations as well, eventually selling corn as an export. This built an overall strive towards self-sufficiency among the plantations.

=== U.S. South ===
Through innovation of the cotton Gin, the U.S. eventually surpassed the production of the other products mentioned with its cotton production even though it had a significantly smaller population of enslaved shipments during this era of second slavery. This example also brought into perspective the expansion and transformation of earlier plantation systems by allowing economic access for poorer white farmers to purchase these plantations during westward expansion. The sale of labor was also kept to an inner network of land trade slave system after the abolition of the Atlantic Slave Trade.

== Global emancipation ==
The Atlantic Slave Trade brought new enslaved Africans to the Americas from the late 15th Century until the mid-1800s, but the means for second slavery still relied on black enslaved labor. During mid to late 1800s, amidst emancipation, illegal slave trade and slave markets would continue to bring their influence to and through the Americas.

The connection to emancipation ties second slavery to efforts of a liberal ideal towards economics and state, but brings forward the history of British political movements with abolition. Tomich writes later in his 2016 book, Politics of Second Slavery, that the British involvement in abolishing the Atlantic Slave Trade was less of a moral obligation by the horrors of slavery, but instead a method of geopolitical control and authority in Europe.

== Responses ==
Articles have been in circulation opposing the idea of Second Slavery in a way by disregarding the potential of continuation after laws abolished it around the world. Klas Rönnbäck's 2010 article points to three authors of the last 30 years that argue "there is little evidence that there was any natural or socioeconomic limit to slavery in the Americas, or that it had started to become unprofitable the time the slave trade was abolished." Thus giving the focus to the British west indies in its assumption of the fall of slavery, while he later shows that these areas were no longer the hubs for major slave shipments.
