= Paulo César Magalhães =

Brazilian footballer

Paulo César
Personal information
- Full name: Paulo César Magalhães
- Date of birth: 5 June 1963 (age 63)
- Place of birth: Santana do Livramento, Brazil
- Position: Left back

Youth career
- –1981: Grêmio

Senior career*
Years	Team	Apps	(Gls)
1981–1984	Grêmio	157	(3)
1985–1986	Vasco da Gama		
1986	Internacional		
1987	XV de Jaú		
1990	Goiânia		
1992	Remo		
1994	São Paulo-RS		
1995–1996	Novo Hamburgo		

International career
1981	Brazil U20		
- * Club domestic league appearances and goals as of 22 January 2024

Paulo César Magalhães (born 5 June 1963), is a Brazilian former professional footballer who played as a left back.

== Career ==
He began his career at Grêmio in 1981, the year in which he played for the Brazilian Under-20 team and won the Toulon tournament. With Grêmio, he was champion of the Copa Libertadores and Copa Intercontinental in 1983. He transferred to Vasco da Gama and later played for smaller teams in Brazilian football. In 2007, he was one of the founders of Cerâmica Atlético Clube.

== Personal life ==
Paulo César is brother of the footballer Osmar Magalhães, and uncle of Paulo Magalhães.

== Honours ==
Grêmio

- Intercontinental Cup: 1983
- Copa Libertadores: 1983

Brazil U20

- Toulon Tournament: 1981
