= Paulo Magalhães =

Chilean footballer (born 1989)

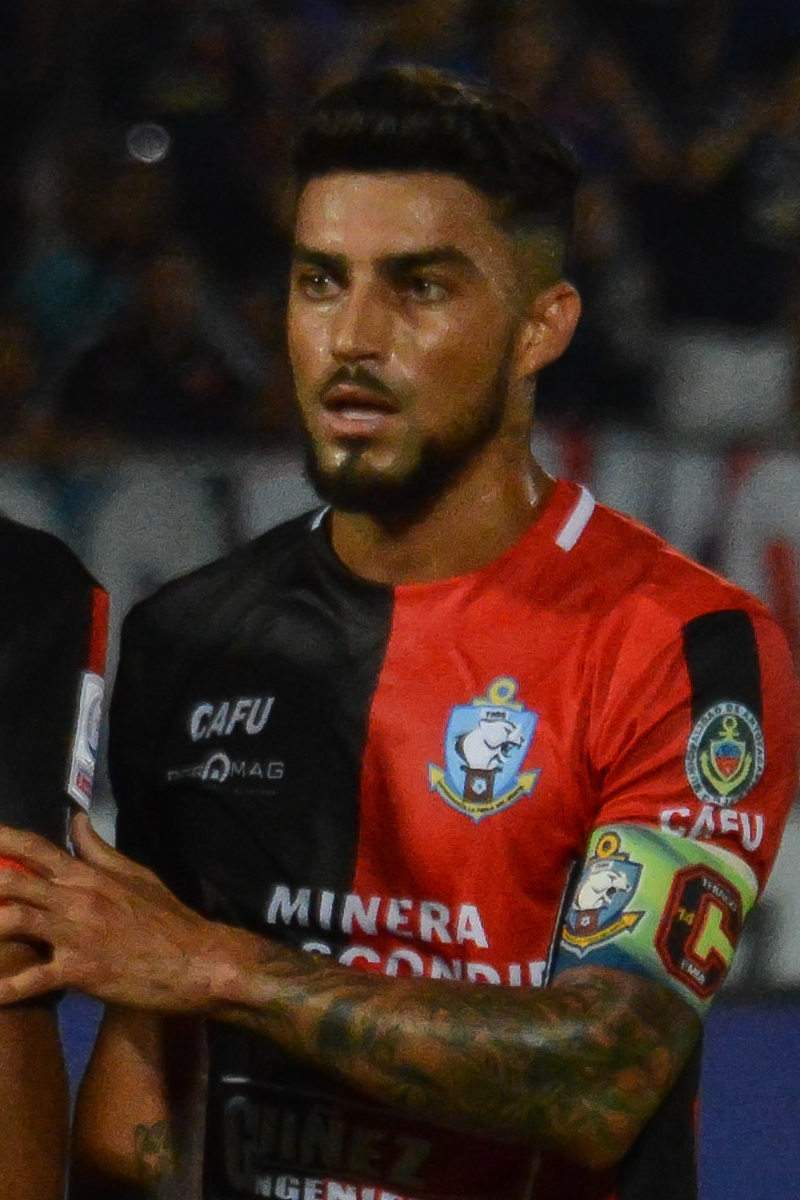
- Magalhães with Deportes Antofagasta in 2018

Personal information
- Full name: Paulo Cezar Magalhães Lobos
- Date of birth: 14 December 1989 (age 36)
- Place of birth: Porto Alegre, Brazil
- Height: 1.77 m (5 ft 10 in)
- Position: Full-back

Youth career
- Deportes Antofagasta

Senior career*
Years	Team	Apps	(Gls)
2006–2008	Deportes Antofagasta	36	(0)
2008	Locarno	0	(0)
2008–2009	Cobreloa	25	(1)
2009–2011	Colo-Colo	51	(2)
2011–2015	Universidad de Chile	99	(6)
2016	Internacional	9	(0)
2016	→ Criciúma (loan)	11	(0)
2017–2018	Deportes Antofagasta	44	(2)
2019–2021	O'Higgins	38	(4)
2021–2022	Deportes Antofagasta	26	(1)
2023	Deportes Iquique	6	(0)
2025	Deportes Rengo	10	(0)
2026	Nortino	–	(–)
Total		355	(16)

International career
2008	Chile U18		
2008–2009	Chile U23	9	(1)
2009	Chile U20	3	(0)
2011–2013	Chile	2	(0)
- * Club domestic league appearances and goals

Paulo Cézar Magalhães Lobos (born 14 December 1989) is a Chilean former professional footballer who played as a full-back.

== Early life ==
Magalhães was born in Porto Alegre, Brazil to a Brazilian father, former footballer Osmar Magalhães, who had previously played in Chile for Deportes Antofagasta where met his mother, Ximena Lobos, who is Chilean.

== Club career ==
=== Deportes Antofagasta ===
Magalhães began in the youth system of Chilean club Deportes Antofagasta. He played on the under 17 and under 19 sides in 2006 and 2007 respectively. In 2006, he made his debut with the adult side under coach Fernando Diaz.

=== Cobreloa ===
Magalhães signed for Cobreloa on a one-year contract in June 2008. He scored his first professional goal on 2 May 2009, against the next club he would sign with, Colo-Colo.

=== Colo-Colo ===
Before the 2009 Clausura Tournament, Colo-Colo lost starting defender Luis Pedro Figueroa. In order to fill the void, Colo-Colo signed Magalhães to a one-year contract. He played regularly in his first tournament with the team and scored two goals and the team went on to win the 2009 Clausura Championship.

=== Returned to Antofagasta ===
In March 2021, Magalhães returned to Deportes Antofagasta by third time.

=== Last years ===
After a year as a free agent, Magalhães signed with Deportes Rengo in the Segunda División Profesional de Chile for the 2025 season.

On 4 April 2026, Magalhães joined club Nortino from Antofagasta, his hometwon.

On 29 August 2026, Magalhães announced his official retirement from professional football.

== International career ==
Magalhães has participated on several different levels with the Chile national team. In 2008, he was part of the Chile Sub-18 side that won the João Havelange tournament which was held in Mexico.

After showing good form in Antofagasta in 2007 and with Cobreloa at the beginning of 2008, Magalhães was named to the Sub-23 national side coached by Eduardo Berizzo. The tournament which took place in Kuala Lumpur, Malaysia, saw he scored one goal against Togo. The same year Magalhaes participated in the Milk Cup, in which Chile took a sub-19 team. Chile made it to the final losing to Northern Ireland 2–1.

In 2009, Magalhães was part of the sub-20 Chile team in the 2009 South American Youth Championship held in Venezuela, which was unable to surpass the group stage. In the same year, he again participated in an international tournament with the Sub-21 Chilean side in the 2009 Toulon Tournament. Finally Magalhães won an international tournament when the team was crowned champions. His good performance in the tournament caused him to sign with Chilean side Colo-Colo.

== Personal life ==
From his paternal line – son of the Brazilian former professional footballer Osmar Magalhães and grandson of the goalkeeper of the same name – he is the nephew of Paulo César, a former footballer who won both the 1983 Copa Libertadores and the 1983 Intercontinental Cup along with Grêmio and that worked as his agent. Also, he is the cousin of Rafael Magalhães and Thiago Pereira.

In 2026, Magalhães started to work as a truck driver.

== Honours ==
Colo-Colo

- Chilean Primera División: 2009 Clausura

Universidad de Chile

- Chilean Primera División: 2011 Clausura, 2012 Apertura, 2014 Apertura
- Copa Sudamericana: 2011
- Copa Chile: 2012–13, 2015
- Supercopa de Chile: 2015

Internacional

- Campeonato Gaúcho: 2016

Chile U18

- João Havelange Tournament: 2008

Chile U21

- Toulon Tournament: 2009
