= Porto União =

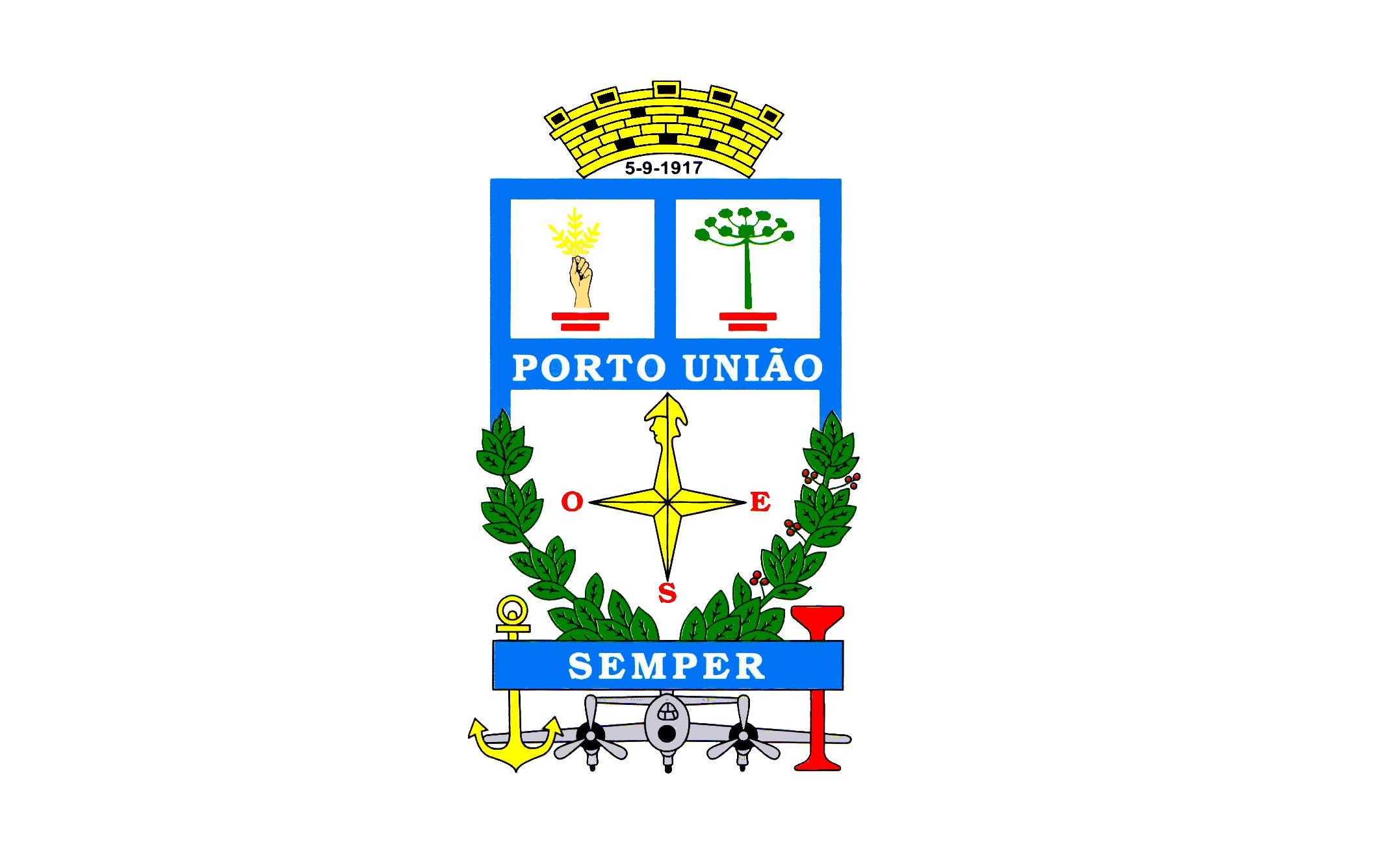
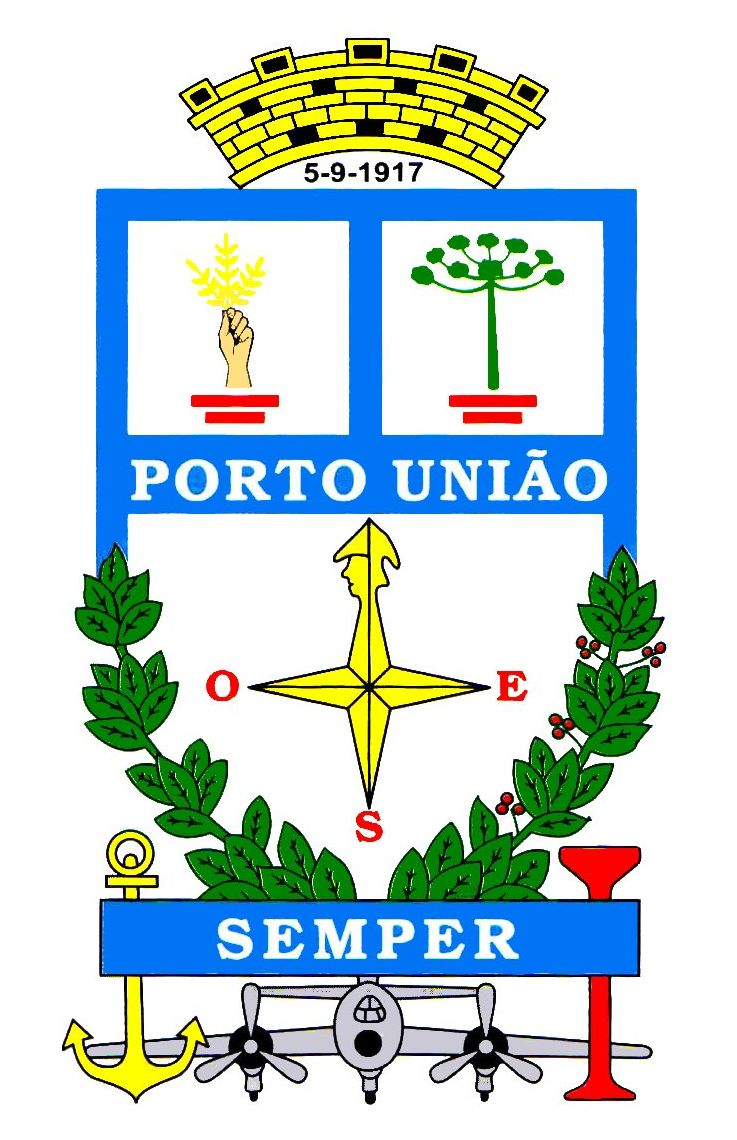
- Flag Coat of arms

- Location in Santa Catarina, Brazil

- Location within Brazil
- Coordinates: 26°14′16″S 51°04′40″W
- Country: Brazil
- Region: South
- State: Santa Catarina

Government
  - Mayor: Eliseu Mibach (PSDB)

Area
  - Total: 851.24 km^{2} (328.67 sq mi)
- Elevation: 752 m (2,467 ft)

Population (2020)
  - Total: 35,543
  - Density: 38.9/km^{2} (101/sq mi)
- Time zone: UTC-3 (UTC-3)
  - Summer (DST): UTC-2 (UTC-2)
- Area code: +55 42
- Website: www.portouniao.sc.gov.br

Porto União is a city located in the Northern Plateau in the State of Santa Catarina and on the left bank of Iguazu River, bordering the city of União da Vitória, Paraná. In 2020, its population was estimated in 35,543 inhabitants.

== History ==
The history of Porto União has always been intrinsically connected with the Iguazu River and with what is considered its twin city União da Vitória.

It all began in 1842 with the discovery of the 'Vau do Iguaçu' (literally meaning 'Iguazu Ford'), the best connection between the South and the Southeast Region, where the army troops and people from Rio Grande do Sul known as 'tropeiros' used to cross the river with their oxen in order to sell them in São Paulo and Minas Gerais. It was also an important stop point for those who used the river in transportation, receiving its first name: Porto da União (Harbour of Union). In a few years, the area rapidly developed.

The small village grew and in 1855 its name was changed to Porto União da Vitória. In the same year, immigration began with the influx of Germans, Poles, Ukrainians, Italians, Austrians and Russians. In 1901, its name again changed, this time to União da Vitória.

In 1912, the Contestado War took place and on September 5, 1917 the municipality of Porto União was created.

In the 1950s, both cities, União da Vitória and Porto União, reach their economic and regional importance as the result the growth of the native wood market and of yerba mate.

Nowadays, the city, just like its twin, lives of the non-native wood market and tourism. Porto União has a subtropical Cfa-like climate with hot summers and rainy months

== Climate ==
Climate data for Irineópolis, elevation 777 m (2,549 ft), (1976–2005)
Month	Jan	Feb	Mar	Apr	May	Jun	Jul	Aug	Sep	Oct	Nov	Dec	Year
Mean daily maximum °C (°F)	28.0 (82.4)	27.9 (82.2)	26.7 (80.1)	23.5 (74.3)	20.7 (69.3)	18.9 (66.0)	18.9 (66.0)	20.6 (69.1)	21.7 (71.1)	23.8 (74.8)	26.0 (78.8)	27.2 (81.0)	23.7 (74.6)
Daily mean °C (°F)	20.9 (69.6)	20.7 (69.3)	19.6 (67.3)	16.3 (61.3)	13.5 (56.3)	11.6 (52.9)	11.3 (52.3)	12.8 (55.0)	14.7 (58.5)	16.8 (62.2)	18.6 (65.5)	20.1 (68.2)	16.4 (61.5)
Mean daily minimum °C (°F)	15.6 (60.1)	15.7 (60.3)	14.6 (58.3)	10.9 (51.6)	7.5 (45.5)	5.8 (42.4)	5.2 (41.4)	6.3 (43.3)	9.0 (48.2)	11.6 (52.9)	12.6 (54.7)	14.2 (57.6)	10.7 (51.4)
Average precipitation mm (inches)	183.0 (7.20)	158.0 (6.22)	117.0 (4.61)	77.0 (3.03)	101.0 (3.98)	102.0 (4.02)	85.0 (3.35)	77.0 (3.03)	146.0 (5.75)	165.0 (6.50)	126.0 (4.96)	147.0 (5.79)	1,484 (58.44)
Average relative humidity (%)	80	82	82	83	85	86	84	81	80	79	77	77	81
Source 1: Empresa Brasileira de Pesquisa Agropecuária (EMBRAPA)
Source 2: Climatempo (precipitation)
