= Futebol Clube do Porto (SC) =

Brazilian football club

Porto
- Full name: Futebol Clube do Porto
- Nickname: Azulão da Fronteira
- Founded: June 9, 1999 (27 years ago)
- Ground: Estádio Municipal Antiocho Pereira, Porto União, Santa Catarina state, Brazil
- Capacity: 12,000
Home colors	Away colors

Futebol Clube do Porto, commonly known as Porto, is a Brazilian football club based in Porto União, Santa Catarina state.

== Honours ==
=== Official tournaments ===
State
Competitions	Titles	Seasons
Campeonato Catarinense Série C	1	2008

=== Runners-up ===
- Campeonato Catarinense Série C (1): 2024

== Stadium ==
Futebol Clube do Porto play their home games at Estádio Municipal Antiocho Pereira. The stadium has a maximum capacity of 12,000 people.
