= Thiago Pereira (footballer) =

Brazilian-Portuguese footballer

Personal information
- Full name: Thiago Magalhães Pereira
- Date of birth: 22 January 1984 (age 42)
- Place of birth: Sapucaia do Sul, Brazil
- Height: 1.87 m (6 ft 1 1/2 in)
- Position: Defender

Youth career
- 1997–2001: Internacional

Senior career*
Years	Team	Apps	(Gls)
2001–2005	Internacional		
2005–2006	Bahia		
2007	Internacional		
2008	Vila Nova		
2009	Brasil de Pelotas	8	(0)
2010	Chapecoense	0	(0)
2010	Ferroviário	21	(1)
2011	Santa Cruz	3	(0)
2011	Penafiel	0	(0)
2012	Paulista	4	(0)
2012–2013	Penafiel	7	(0)
2013	→ Académico de Viseu (loan)	17	(2)
2013–2014	Académico de Viseu	11	(0)
2014–2016	Lusitano FCV	45	(1)
2016–2017	Mirandela	34	(1)
2017	Ferreira de Aves	8	(1)
2018	GDC Roriz	1	(0)
2018–2019	Carvalhais	24	(1)
- * Club domestic league appearances and goals as of 18:18, 14 October 2020 (UTC)

Thiago Magalhães Pereira (born 22 January 1984) is a Brazilian football player. He also holds Portuguese citizenship.

== Club career ==
He made his professional debut in the Campeonato Gaúcho for Brasil de Pelotas on 13 February 2009 in a game against Sapucaiense.

== Personal ==
He is a cousin of Paulo Magalhães.
