= September 3 =

September 3 this year in various calendars
- Thursday, 3 September 2026
Akan	Nwonayaw
Armenian	15 Hoṙi 1476
Aztec	Atemoztli 16, 3 Cuetzpalin
Babylonian	20 Abu, 2337 SE
Balinese pawukon	Luang, Pepet, Beteng, Laba, Pon, Aryang, Wraspati of Uye, Brahma, Ogan, Manuh
Bengali	19 Bhadro, BS 1433
Chinese	Yang Metal Dragon・Legs Mansion; Fire Horse Year, Month 7, Day 22 (Chushu, 4 days until Bailu)
Common Era	3 September 2026 CE
Coptic	28 Mesori, AM 1742
Egyptian	20 Tybi, 2775 NE
Ethiopian	28 Naḥasē, 2018 Amätä Məhrät
French Republican	Décade II, Septidi de Fructidor de l'Année 234 de la République
Gregorian	3 September, AD 2026
Hebrew	21 Elul, AM 5786
Hindu	Kṛttikā・Vyāghāta; Solar: 18 Bhādrapada, 1948 SE; Lunisolar: Saptamī, Kṛishna pakṣa of Śrāvaṇa, 2083 VE; Rāudra・5127 KY・1,872,821
Icelandic	Fimmtudagur, 10 Tvímánuður 2026
Islamic	20 Rabi' al-awwal, AH 1448 (using tabular method)
ISO week date	2026-W36-4
Japanese	22 Fumizuki, Reiwa 8 (Shosho, 4 days until Hakuro)
Julian	21 August, AD 2026 (AM 7534)
Julian day	2461287
Korean	22 Wonsungidal, 4359 DE
Maya	13.0.13.16.4; 17 Mol, 3 Kan
Roman	ante diem XII Kalendas Septembres, MMDCCLXXIX AUC
Solar Hijri	12 Shahrivar, SH 1405
Tibetan	22 gro bzhin, me pho rta 2153 or 1772 or 1000

<<	September					>>
Su	Mo	Tu	We	Th	Fr	Sa
		1	2	3	4	5
6	7	8	9	10	11	12
13	14	15	16	17	18	19
20	21	22	23	24	25	26
27	28	29	30
2026

September 3 in recent years
2026 (Thursday)
2025 (Wednesday)
2024 (Tuesday)
2023 (Sunday)
2022 (Saturday)
2021 (Friday)
2020 (Thursday)
2019 (Tuesday)
2018 (Monday)
2017 (Sunday)

September 3 is the 246th day of the year (247th in leap years) in the Gregorian calendar; 119 days remain until the end of the year.

== Events ==
=== Pre-1600 ===
- 36 BC – In the Battle of Naulochus, Marcus Vipsanius Agrippa, admiral of Octavian, defeats Sextus Pompey, son of Pompey, thus ending Pompeian resistance to the Second Triumvirate.
- 301 – San Marino, one of the smallest nations in the world and the world's oldest republic still in existence, is founded by Saint Marinus.
- 590 – Consecration of Pope Gregory I (Gregory the Great).
- 673 – King Wamba of the Visigoths puts down a revolt by Hilderic, governor of Nîmes (France) and rival for the throne.
- 863 – Major Byzantine victory under general Petronas at the Battle of Lalakaon against an Arab raid under emir Umar al-Aqta, who is killed in battle.
- 1189 – Richard I of England (a.k.a. Richard "the Lionheart") is crowned at Westminster.
- 1260 – The Mamluks defeat the Mongols at the Battle of Ain Jalut in Palestine, marking their first decisive defeat and the point of maximum expansion of the Mongol Empire.
- 1335 – At the congress of Visegrád Charles I of Hungary mediates a reconciliation between two neighboring monarchs, John of Bohemia and Casimir III of Poland.
- 1411 – The Treaty of Selymbria is concluded between the Ottoman Empire and the Republic of Venice.

=== 1601–1900 ===
- 1650 – Victory over the royalists in the Battle of Dunbar opens the way to Edinburgh for the New Model Army during the English invasion of Scotland.
- 1651 – The Battle of Worcester is the last significant action in the Wars of the Three Kingdoms.
- 1658 – The death of Oliver Cromwell; Richard Cromwell becomes Lord Protector of England.
- 1666 – The Royal Exchange burns down in the Great Fire of London.
- 1777 – American Revolutionary War: During the Battle of Cooch's Bridge, the Flag of the United States is flown in battle for the first time.
- 1783 – American Revolutionary War: The war ends with the signing of the Treaty of Paris by the United States and the Kingdom of Great Britain.
- 1798 – The week long battle of St. George's Caye begins between Spain and Britain off the coast of Belize.
- 1812 – Twenty-four settlers are killed in the Pigeon Roost Massacre in Indiana.
- 1838 – Future abolitionist Frederick Douglass escapes from slavery.
- 1843 – King Otto of Greece is forced to grant a constitution following an uprising in Athens.
- 1855 – American Indian Wars: In Nebraska, 700 soldiers under United States General William S. Harney avenge the Grattan massacre by attacking a Sioux village and killing 100 men, women and children.
- 1861 – American Civil War: Confederate General Leonidas Polk invades neutral Kentucky, prompting the state legislature to ask for Union assistance.
- 1870 – Franco-Prussian War: The Siege of Metz begins, resulting in a decisive Prussian victory on October 23.
- 1878 – Over 640 die when the crowded pleasure boat Princess Alice collides with the Bywell Castle in the River Thames.
- 1879 – Siege of the British Residency in Kabul: British envoy Sir Louis Cavagnari and 72 men of the Guides are massacred by Afghan troops while defending the British Residency in Kabul. Their heroism and loyalty became famous and revered throughout the British Empire.
- 1895 – John Brallier becomes the first openly paid professional American football player, when he was paid US$10 by David Berry, to play for the Latrobe Athletic Association in a 12–0 win over the Jeanette Athletic Association.

=== 1901–present ===
- 1911 – A fire that started on Fraser's Million Dollar Pier destroys six to eight square blocks of Ocean Park, California.
- 1914 – Wilhelm, Prince of Albania leaves the country after just six months due to opposition to his rule.
- 1914 – French composer Albéric Magnard is killed defending his estate against invading German soldiers.
- 1916 – World War I: Leefe Robinson destroys the German airship Schütte-Lanz SL 11 over Cuffley, north of London; this is the first German airship to be shot down on British soil.
- 1925 – USS Shenandoah, the United States' first American-built rigid airship, is destroyed in a squall line over Noble County, Ohio. Fourteen of her 42-man crew perished, including her commander, Zachary Lansdowne.
- 1933 – Yevgeniy Abalakov is the first man to reach the highest point in the Soviet Union, Communism Peak (now called Ismoil Somoni Peak and situated in Tajikistan) (7495 m).
- 1935 – Sir Malcolm Campbell reaches a speed of 304.331 miles per hour on the Bonneville Salt Flats in Utah, becoming the first person to drive an automobile over 300 mph.
- 1939 – World War II: France, the United Kingdom, New Zealand and Australia declare war on Germany after the invasion of Poland, forming the Allied nations. The Viceroy of India also declares war, but without consulting the provincial legislatures.
- 1939 – World War II: The United Kingdom and France begin a naval blockade of Germany that lasts until the end of the war. This also marks the beginning of the Battle of the Atlantic.
- 1939 – World War II: Passenger liner Athenia is torpedoed and sunk by German submarine U-30. She is the first British ship lost in World War II, with a reported 117 civillian passenger and crew killed out of 1,418 aboard.
- 1941 – The Holocaust: Karl Fritzsch, deputy camp commandant of the Auschwitz concentration camp, experiments with the use of Zyklon B in the gassing of Soviet POWs.
- 1942 – World War II: In response to news of its coming liquidation, Dov Lopatyn leads an uprising in the Ghetto of Lakhva (present-day Belarus).
- 1943 – World War II: British and Canadian troops land on the Italian mainland. On the same day, Walter Bedell Smith and Giuseppe Castellano sign the Armistice of Cassibile, although it is not announced for another five days.
- 1944 – Holocaust: Diarist Anne Frank and her family are placed on the last transport train from the Westerbork transit camp to the Auschwitz concentration camp, arriving three days later.
- 1945 – A three-day celebration begins in China, following the Victory over Japan Day on September 2.
- 1950 – "Nino" Farina becomes the first Formula One Drivers' champion after winning the 1950 Italian Grand Prix.
- 1954 – The People's Liberation Army begins shelling the Republic of China-controlled islands of Quemoy, starting the First Taiwan Strait Crisis.
- 1967 – Dagen H in Sweden: Traffic changes from driving on the left to driving on the right overnight.
- 1971 – Qatar becomes an independent state.
- 1976 – Viking program: The American Viking 2 spacecraft lands at Utopia Planitia on Mars.
- 1978 – During the Rhodesian Bush War a group of ZIPRA guerrillas shot down civilian Vickers Viscount aircraft (Air Rhodesia Flight 825) with a Soviet-made SAM Strela-2; of 56 passengers and crew 38 people died in crash, 10 were massacred by the guerrillas at the site.
- 1981 – The Convention on the Elimination of All Forms of Discrimination Against Women, an international bill of rights for women, is instituted by the United Nations.
- 1987 – In a coup d'état in Burundi, President Jean-Baptiste Bagaza is deposed by Major Pierre Buyoya.
- 1989 – Cubana de Aviación Flight 9046 crashes into a residential area of Havana shortly after takeoff from José Martí International Airport, killing 150.
- 1989 – Varig Flight 254 crashes in the Amazon rainforest near São José do Xingu in Brazil, killing 12.
- 1997 – Vietnam Airlines Flight 815 (Tupolev Tu-134) crashes on approach into Phnom Penh airport, killing 64.
- 2001 – In Belfast, Protestant loyalists begin a picket of Holy Cross, a Catholic primary school for girls.
- 2004 – Beslan school siege ends, resulting in over 330 fatalities, including 186 children.
- 2010 – After taking off from Dubai International Airport, UPS Airlines Flight 6 develops an in-flight fire in the cargo hold and crashes near Nad Al Sheba, killing both crew members on board.
- 2016 – The U.S. and China, together responsible for 40% of the world's carbon emissions, both formally ratify the Paris global climate agreement.
- 2017 – North Korea conducts its sixth and most powerful nuclear test.

== Births ==
=== Pre-1600 ===
- 1034 – Emperor Go-Sanjō of Japan (died 1073)
- 1568 – Adriano Banchieri, Italian organist and composer (died 1634)

=== 1601–1900 ===
- 1675 – Paul Dudley, American lawyer and jurist (died 1751)
- 1693 – Charles Radclyffe, English captain and politician (died 1746)
- 1695 – Pietro Antonio Locatelli, Italian violin player and composer (died 1764)
- 1704 – Joseph de Jussieu, French explorer, geographer, and mathematician, (died 1779)
- 1710 – Abraham Trembley, Swiss biologist and zoologist (died 1784)
- 1724 – Guy Carleton, 1st Baron Dorchester, Irish-English general and politician, 21st Governor General of Canada (died 1808)
- 1781 – Eugène de Beauharnais, French general and politician (died 1824)
- 1803 – Prudence Crandall, American educator (died 1890)
- 1810 – Paul Kane, Irish-Canadian painter (died 1871)
- 1811 – John Humphrey Noyes, American activist, founded the Oneida Community (died 1886)
- 1814 – James Joseph Sylvester, English mathematician and academic (died 1897)
- 1820 – George Hearst, American businessman and politician (died 1891)
- 1840 – Jacob Christian Fabricius, Danish composer (died 1919)
- 1841 – Tom Emmett, English cricketer (died 1904)
- 1849 – Sarah Orne Jewett, American novelist, short story writer and poet (died 1909)
- 1851 – Olga Constantinovna of Russia, Queen consort of the Hellenes (died 1926)
- 1854 – Charles Tatham, American fencer (died 1939)
- 1856 – Louis Sullivan, American architect and educator, designed the Carson, Pirie, Scott and Company Building (died 1924)
- 1869 – Fritz Pregl, Slovenian chemist and physician, Nobel Prize laureate (died 1930)
- 1875 – Ferdinand Porsche, Austrian-German engineer and businessman, founded Porsche (died 1951)
- 1878 – Dorothea Douglass Lambert Chambers, English tennis player (died 1960)
- 1882 – Johnny Douglas, English cricketer and boxer (died 1930)
- 1887 – Frank Christian, American trumpet player (died 1973)
- 1897 – Sally Benson, American author and screenwriter (died 1972)
- 1899 – Frank Macfarlane Burnet, Australian virologist and academic, Nobel Prize laureate (died 1985)
- 1900 – Percy Chapman, English cricketer (died 1961)
- 1900 – Urho Kekkonen, Finnish journalist, lawyer, and politician, 8th President of Finland (died 1986)

=== 1901–present ===
- 1901 – Eduard van Beinum, Dutch violinist, pianist, and conductor (died 1959)
- 1905 – Carl David Anderson, American physicist and academic, Nobel Prize laureate (died 1991)
- 1905 – John Mills, New Zealand cricketer (died 1972)
- 1907 – Loren Eiseley, American anthropologist, philosopher, and author (died 1977)
- 1908 – Lev Pontryagin, Russian mathematician and academic (died 1988)
- 1910 – Kitty Carlisle, American actress, singer, socialite, and game show panelist (died 2007)
- 1910 – Franz Jáchym, Austrian Roman Catholic archbishop (died 1984)
- 1910 – Maurice Papon, French civil servant and convicted war criminal (died 2007)
- 1911 – Bernard Mammes, American cyclist and sergeant (died 2000)
- 1913 – Alan Ladd, American actor and producer (died 1964)
- 1914 – Dixy Lee Ray, American biologist and politician, 17th Governor of Washington (died 1994)
- 1915 – Knut Nystedt, Norwegian organist and composer (died 2014)
- 1915 – Memphis Slim, American singer-songwriter and pianist (died 1988)
- 1916 – Eddie Stanky, American baseball player, coach, and manager (died 1999)
- 1918 – Helen Wagner, American actress (died 2010)
- 1919 – Phil Stern, American soldier and photographer (died 2014)
- 1920 – Tereska Torrès, French soldier and author (died 2012)
- 1921 – John Aston Sr., English footballer (died 2003)
- 1921 – Thurston Dart, English pianist, conductor, and musicologist (died 1971)
- 1921 – Marguerite Higgins, American journalist and author (died 1966)
- 1923 – Glen Bell, American businessman, founded Taco Bell (died 2010)
- 1923 – Alice Gibson, Belizean chief librarian and educator (died 2021)
- 1923 – Fred Hawkins, American golfer (died 2014)
- 1923 – Mort Walker, American cartoonist (died 2018)
- 1924 – Mary Grace Canfield, American actress (died 2014)
- 1925 – Anne Jackson, American actress (died 2016)
- 1925 – Bengt Lindström, Swedish painter and sculptor (died 2008)
- 1925 – Hank Thompson, American singer-songwriter and guitarist (died 2007)
- 1926 – Alison Lurie, American author and academic (died 2020)
- 1926 – Irene Papas, Greek actress (died 2022)
- 1926 – Uttam Kumar, Indian Bengali actor, director, producer, singer, composer and playback singer (died 1980)
- 1928 – Gaston Thorn, Luxembourg lawyer and politician, 8th Prime Minister of Luxembourg (died 2007)
- 1928 – Pilar Pallete, Peruvian-American painter and actress
- 1929 – Whitey Bulger, American organized crime boss (died 2018)
- 1929 – Carlo Clerici, Swiss cyclist (died 2007)
- 1929 – Steve Rickard, New Zealand-Australian wrestler, trainer, and promoter (died 2015)
- 1929 – Armand Vaillancourt, Canadian sculptor and painter
- 1930 – Cherry Wilder, New Zealand author and poet (died 2002)
- 1931 – Albert DeSalvo, American serial killer known as the Boston Strangler (died 1973)
- 1931 – Dick Motta, American basketball player and coach
- 1931 – Guy Spitaels, Belgian academic and politician, 7th Minister-President of Wallonia (died 2012)
- 1932 – Eileen Brennan, American actress and singer (died 2013)
- 1933 – Basil Butcher, Guyanese cricketer (died 2019)
- 1933 – Tompall Glaser, American singer-songwriter (died 2013)
- 1934 – Freddie King, American singer-songwriter and guitarist (died 1976)
- 1935 – Helmut Clasen, German-Canadian motorcycle racer
- 1936 – Zine El Abidine Ben Ali, Tunisian soldier and politician, 2nd President of Tunisia (died 2019)
- 1938 – Liliane Ackermann, French microbiologist, community leader, writer, and lecturer (died 2007)
- 1938 – Sarah Bradford, English historian and author
- 1938 – Caryl Churchill, English-Canadian playwright
- 1938 – Richard MacCormac, English architect, founded MJP Architects (died 2014)
- 1938 – Ryōji Noyori, Japanese chemist and academic, Nobel Prize laureate
- 1940 – Frank Duffy, English architect
- 1940 – Pauline Collins, English actress (died 2025)
- 1940 – Eduardo Galeano, Uruguayan journalist and author (died 2015)
- 1940 – Brian Lochore, New Zealand rugby player and coach (died 2019)
- 1941 – Sergei Dovlatov, Russian-American journalist and author (died 1990)
- 1942 – Al Jardine, American singer-songwriter and guitarist
- 1943 – Valerie Perrine, American model and actress (died 2026)
- 1944 – Geoff Arnold, English cricketer and coach
- 1944 – Ray Groom, Australian footballer, lawyer, and politician, 39th Premier of Tasmania
- 1945 – George Biondo, American bass player and songwriter
- 1945 – Peter Goddard, English physicist and mathematician
- 1945 – Martha Saxton, American Historian (died 2023)
- 1947 – Kjell Magne Bondevik, Norwegian minister and politician, 26th Prime Minister of Norway
- 1947 – Michael Connarty, Scottish educator and politician
- 1947 – Mario Draghi, Italian banker and economist
- 1947 – Gérard Houllier, French footballer and coach (died 2020)
- 1947 – Susan Milan, English flute player and composer
- 1948 – Don Brewer, American drummer and singer-songwriter
- 1948 – Lyudmila Karachkina, Ukrainian astronomer
- 1948 – Fotis Kouvelis, Greek lawyer and politician, Greek Minister of Justice
- 1948 – Levy Mwanawasa, Zambian lawyer and politician, 3rd President of Zambia (died 2008)
- 1949 – José Pékerman, Argentine footballer, coach, and manager
- 1949 – Patriarch Peter VII of Alexandria (died 2004)
- 1950 – Doug Pinnick, American rock singer-songwriter and bass player
- 1951 – Denys Hobson, South African cricketer
- 1951 – D. Rolland Jennings, American politician
- 1952 – Shakti Kapoor, Indian actor
- 1953 – Jean-Pierre Jeunet, French director, producer, and screenwriter
- 1953 – George Peponis, Greek-Australian rugby league player and physician
- 1954 – Jaak Uudmäe, Estonian triple jumper and coach
- 1955 – Steve Jones, English singer-songwriter and guitarist
- 1956 – Jishu Dasgupta, Indian actor and director (died 2012)
- 1956 – Pat McGeown, Irish republican activist (died 1996)
- 1956 – Stephen Woolley, English director and producer
- 1957 – Garth Ancier, American businessman
- 1957 – Earl Cureton, American basketball player and coach (died 2024)
- 1957 – Steve Schirripa, American actor and producer
- 1957 – Sadhguru, Indian yogi, mystic
- 1957 – Ivan Šramko, Governor of the National Bank of Slovakia
- 1960 – Nick Gibb, English accountant and politician
- 1961 – Andy Griffiths, Australian author
- 1962 – David De Roure, English computer scientist and academic
- 1963 – Sam Adams, American politician, 51st Mayor of Portland
- 1963 – Mubarak Ghanim, Emirati footballer
- 1963 – Malcolm Gladwell, Canadian journalist, essayist, and critic
- 1964 – Adam Curry, American-Dutch businessman and television host, co-founded mevio
- 1964 – Spike Feresten, American screenwriter and producer
- 1964 – Junaid Jamshed, Pakistani singer-songwriter, guitarist and naat khawan (died 2016)
- 1964 – Holt McCallany, American actor
- 1965 – Rachel Johnson, British journalist
- 1965 – Vaden Todd Lewis, American singer-songwriter and guitarist
- 1965 – Costas Mandylor, Australian actor
- 1965 – Charlie Sheen, American actor and producer
- 1966 – Steven Johnson Leyba, American painter and author
- 1966 – Vladimir Ryzhkov, Russian historian and politician
- 1967 – Chris Gatling, American basketball player
- 1967 – Luis Gonzalez, American baseball player
- 1968 – Grace Poe, Filipino educator and politician
- 1969 – Noah Baumbach, American actor, director, producer, and screenwriter
- 1969 – John Fugelsang, American comedian, actor, and talk show host
- 1969 – Robert Karlsson, Swedish golfer
- 1969 – Marianna Komlos, Canadian bodybuilder, model, and wrestler (died 2004)
- 1969 – Matthew Offord, English journalist and politician
- 1969 – John Picacio, American artist
- 1970 – Jeremy Glick, American businessman (died 2001)
- 1970 – George Lynch, American basketball player and coach
- 1970 – Gareth Southgate, English footballer and manager
- 1971 – Kiran Desai, Indian-American author
- 1971 – Glen Housman, Australian swimmer
- 1971 – Chabeli Iglesias, Portuguese-Spanish journalist
- 1971 – Paolo Montero, Uruguayan footballer and manager
- 1972 – Christine Boudrias, Canadian speed skater
- 1972 – Bob Evans, American wrestler and trainer
- 1972 – Robbie O'Davis, Australian rugby league player
- 1972 – Martin Straka, Czech ice hockey player
- 1973 – Jennifer Paige, American singer
- 1973 – Damon Stoudamire, American basketball player and coach
- 1974 – Martin Gerber, Swiss ice hockey player
- 1974 – Clare Kramer, American actress, producer, and screenwriter
- 1974 – Rahul Sanghvi, Indian cricketer
- 1975 – Daniel Chan, Hong Kong singer-songwriter and actor
- 1975 – Cristobal Huet, French ice hockey player
- 1975 – Redfoo, American singer-songwriter, producer, and dancer
- 1976 – Valery V. Afanasyev, Russian ice hockey player and coach
- 1976 – Ashley Jones, American actress
- 1976 – Jevon Kearse, American football player
- 1976 – Raheem Morris, American football player and coach
- 1977 – Casey Hampton, American football player
- 1977 – Rui Marques, Angolan footballer
- 1977 – Olof Mellberg, Swedish footballer
- 1977 – Nate Robertson, American baseball player
- 1978 – Terje Bakken, Norwegian singer-songwriter (died 2004)
- 1978 – John Curtis, English footballer
- 1978 – Nichole Hiltz, American actress
- 1978 – Michal Rozsíval, Czech ice hockey player
- 1978 – Nick Wechsler, American actor
- 1979 – Júlio César, Brazilian footballer
- 1979 – Tomo Miličević, Bosnian-American guitarist
- 1980 – B.G., American rapper and actor
- 1980 – Daniel Bilos, Argentine footballer
- 1980 – Cindy Burger, Dutch footballer
- 1980 – Jason McCaslin, Canadian singer-songwriter, bass player, and producer
- 1981 – Fearne Cotton, English television and radio presenter
- 1982 – Sarah Burke, Canadian skier (died 2012)
- 1982 – Andrew McMahon, American singer-songwriter, pianist, and producer
- 1982 – Kaori Natori, Japanese singer
- 1982 – Tiago Rannow, Brazilian footballer
- 1982 – Chris Wilcox, American basketball player
- 1983 – Augusto Farfus, Brazilian race car driver
- 1983 – Nicky Hunt, English footballer
- 1983 – Marcus McCauley, American football player
- 1983 – Valdas Vasylius, Lithuanian basketball player
- 1984 – Mason Crosby, American football player
- 1984 – Garrett Hedlund, American actor
- 1984 – T. J. Perkins, Filipino-American wrestler
- 1985 – Scott Carson, English footballer
- 1985 – Kelvin Wilson, English footballer
- 1986 – Shaun White, American snowboarder, skateboarder, and guitarist
- 1986 – OMI, Jamaican singer
- 1986 – Capitão Telhada, Brazilian politician
- 1987 – Allie, Canadian wrestler
- 1987 – Modibo Maïga, Malian footballer
- 1987 – Dawid Malan, English cricketer
- 1987 – James Neal, Canadian ice hockey player
- 1988 – Jérôme Boateng, Ghanaian-German footballer
- 1988 – Hana Makhmalbaf, Iranian director and producer
- 1990 – Mohammad Shami, Indian cricketer
- 1992 – August Alsina, American singer-songwriter
- 1992 – Sakshi Malik, Indian wrestler
- 1993 – Lee So-jung, South Korean singer
- 1993 – Dominic Thiem, Austrian tennis player
- 1993 – Lee Seong-jong, South Korean singer
- 1994 – Francis Molo, New Zealand rugby league player
- 1994 – Glen Rea, English-Irish footballer
- 1995 – Myles Jack, American football player
- 1995 – Niklas Süle, German footballer
- 1996 – Joy, South Korean idol and actress
- 1996 – Abrahm DeVine, American swimmer
- 1996 – William Eskelinen, Swedish footballer
- 1996 – Nanda Kyaw, Burmese footballer
- 1996 – Florian Maitre, French cyclist
- 1996 – Callum Moore, Australian footballer
- 1996 – Neilson Powless, American cyclist
- 1996 – Yoane Wissa, French-Congolese footballer
- 1997 – Reniece Boyce, West Indian cricketer
- 1997 – Carter Kieboom, American baseball player
- 1997 – Salome Pazhava, Georgian rhythmic gymnast
- 1997 – Devin Singletary, American football player
- 1997 – Bernard Tekpetey, Ghanaian footballer
- 1998 – Oskar Seuntjens, Belgian politician
- 1999 – Rich Brian, Indonesian rapper and singer
- 2000 – Brandon Williams, English footballer
- 2001 – Kaia Gerber, American model and actress
- 2003 – Jack Dylan Grazer, American actor
- 2010 – Tanitoluwa Adewumi, Nigerian-American chess player

== Deaths ==
=== Pre-1600 ===
- 264 – Sun Xiu, Chinese emperor (born 235)
- 618 – Xue Ju, emperor of Qin
- 863 – Umar al-Aqta, Arab emir
- 931 – Uda, emperor of Japan (born 867)
- 1120 – Gerard Thom (The Blessed Gerard), founder of the Knights Hospitaller (born c. 1040)
- 1189 – Jacob of Orléans, French Jewish scholar
- 1301 – Alberto I della Scala, Lord of Verona
- 1313 – Anna of Bohemia (born 1290)
- 1354 – Joanikije II, Serbian patriarch and saint
- 1400 – John Holland, 1st Duke of Exeter (born c. 1352)
- 1402 – Gian Galeazzo Visconti, Italian son of Galeazzo II Visconti (born 1351)
- 1420 – Robert Stewart, Duke of Albany (born 1340)
- 1467 – Eleanor of Portugal, Holy Roman Empress (born 1434)
- 1592 – Robert Greene, English author and playwright (born 1558)

=== 1601–1900 ===
- 1609 – Jean Richardot, Belgian diplomat (born 1540)
- 1634 – Edward Coke, English lawyer, judge, and politician, Lord Chief Justice of England and Wales (born 1552)
- 1653 – Claudius Salmasius, French scholar and author (born 1588)
- 1658 – Oliver Cromwell, English general and politician, Lord Protector of England (born 1599)
- 1720 – Henri de Massue, Earl of Galway, French general and diplomat (born 1648)
- 1729 – Jean Hardouin, French historian and scholar (born 1646)
- 1766 – Archibald Bower, Scottish historian and author (born 1686)
- 1808 – John Montgomery, American merchant and politician (born 1722)
- 1857 – John McLoughlin, Canadian-American businessman (born 1784)
- 1866 – Konstantin Flavitsky, Russian painter (born 1830)
- 1877 – Adolphe Thiers, French historian and politician, 2nd President of France (born 1797)
- 1883 – Ivan Turgenev, Russian author and playwright (born 1818)
- 1886 – William W. Snow, American lawyer and politician (born 1812)
- 1893 – James Harrison, Scottish-Australian engineer, journalist, and politician (born 1816)

=== 1901–present ===
- 1901 – Evelyn Abbott, English classical scholar (born 1843)
- 1903 – Joseph Skipsey, English miner, author and poet (born 1832)
- 1906 – Mihály Kolossa, Hungarian author and poet (born 1846)
- 1914 – Albéric Magnard, French composer and educator (born 1865)
- 1929 – John Bigham, 1st Viscount Mersey, English jurist and politician (born 1840)
- 1936 – Nikita Balieff, Armenian-Russian puppeteer and director (born 1876)
- 1941 – Rafailo Momčilović, Serbian Orthodox hegumen and painter (born 1875)
- 1942 – Will James, Canadian-American author and illustrator (born 1892)
- 1942 – Séraphine Louis, French painter (born 1864)
- 1944 – John Lumsden, Irish physician, founded the St. John Ambulance Brigade of Ireland (born 1869)
- 1948 – Edvard Beneš, Czech academic and politician, 2nd President of Czechoslovakia (born 1884)
- 1954 – Marika Kotopouli, Greek actress (born 1887)
- 1961 – Robert E. Gross, American businessman (born 1897)
- 1962 – E. E. Cummings, American poet and playwright (born 1894)
- 1963 – Louis MacNeice, Irish poet and playwright (born 1907)
- 1967 – Francis Ouimet, American golfer and banker (born 1893)
- 1969 – John Lester, American cricketer and soccer player (born 1871)
- 1970 – Vasil Gendov, Bulgarian actor, director, and screenwriter (born 1891)
- 1970 – Vince Lombardi, American football player and coach (born 1913)
- 1970 – Alan Wilson, American singer-songwriter and guitarist (born 1943)
- 1974 – Harry Partch, American composer and theorist (born 1901)
- 1977 – Gianni Vella, Maltese artist (born 1885)
- 1980 – Barbara O'Neil, American actress (born 1910)
- 1980 – Duncan Renaldo, Romanian-American actor, producer, and screenwriter (born 1904)
- 1981 – Alec Waugh, English soldier and author (born 1898)
- 1985 – Johnny Marks, American songwriter (born 1909)
- 1987 – Morton Feldman, American composer and educator (born 1926)
- 1988 – Ferit Melen, Turkish civil servant and politician, 14th Prime Minister of Turkey (born 1906)
- 1989 – Gaetano Scirea, Italian footballer (born 1953)
- 1991 – Frank Capra, Italian-American director, producer, and screenwriter (born 1897)
- 1993 – David Brown, English businessman (born 1904)
- 1994 – James Thomas Aubrey, Jr., American screenwriter and producer (born 1918)
- 1994 – Billy Wright, English footballer and manager (born 1924)
- 1995 – Mary Adshead, English painter (born 1904)
- 1996 – Emily Kame Kngwarreye, Australian painter (born 1910)
- 1999 – Emma Bailey, American auctioneer and author (born 1910)
- 2000 – Edward Anhalt, American actor, producer, and screenwriter (born 1914)
- 2001 – Pauline Kael, American film critic and author (born 1919)
- 2002 – Kenneth Hare, Canadian climatologist and academic (born 1919)
- 2002 – W. Clement Stone, American businessman, philanthropist, and author (born 1902)
- 2003 – Alan Dugan, American soldier and poet (born 1923)
- 2003 – Rudolf Leiding, German businessman (born 1914)
- 2005 – R. S. R. Fitter, English biologist and author (born 1913)
- 2005 – William Rehnquist, American lawyer and jurist, 16th Chief Justice of the United States (born 1924)
- 2007 – Carter Albrecht, American keyboard player and guitarist (born 1973)
- 2007 – Syd Jackson, New Zealand trade union leader and activist (born 1939)
- 2007 – Jane Tomlinson, English runner (born 1964)
- 2007 – Steve Fossett, American aviator (born 1944)
- 2008 – Donald Blakeslee, American colonel and pilot (born 1917)
- 2010 – Noah Howard, American saxophonist (born 1943)
- 2010 – Robert Schimmel, American comedian, actor, and screenwriter (born 1950)
- 2012 – Griselda Blanco, Colombian drug lord (born 1943)
- 2012 – Harold Dunaway, American race car driver and pilot (born 1933)
- 2012 – Michael Clarke Duncan, American actor (born 1957)
- 2012 – Siegfried Jamrowski, Russian-German soldier and pilot (born 1917)
- 2012 – Sun Myung Moon, Korean religious leader and businessman, founded the Unification Church (born 1920)
- 2012 – Charlie Rose, American lawyer and politician (born 1939)
- 2013 – Ralph M. Holman, American lawyer and judge (born 1914)
- 2013 – Pedro Ferriz Santacruz, Mexican-American journalist (born 1921)
- 2013 – José Ramón Larraz, Spanish director and screenwriter (born 1929)
- 2013 – Janet Lembke, American author and scholar (born 1933)
- 2013 – Don Meineke, American basketball player (born 1930)
- 2013 – Lewis Morley, Hong Kong-Australian photographer (born 1925)
- 2014 – Aarno Raninen, Finnish singer-songwriter and pianist (born 1944)
- 2014 – A. P. Venkateswaran, Indian soldier and politician, 14th Foreign Secretary of India (born 1930)
- 2015 – Adrian Cadbury, English rower and businessman (born 1929)
- 2015 – Judy Carne, English actress and comedian (born 1939)
- 2015 – Carter Lay, American businessman and philanthropist (born 1971)
- 2015 – Zhang Zhen, Chinese general and politician (born 1914)
- 2015 – Chandra Bahadur Dangi, world record holder for shortest man (born 1939)
- 2017 – Walter Becker, American musician, songwriter, and record producer (born 1950)
- 2017 – John Ashbery, American poet (born 1927)
- 2024 – Flora Fraser, 21st Lady Saltoun, Scottish peer (born 1930)
- 2024 – Wayne Graham, American baseball player and coach (born 1936)
- 2024 – Charley Johnson, American football player (born 1938)
- 2026 – Ritu Khullar, Canadian jurist (born 1964)

== Holidays and observances ==
- Christian feast day:
  - Blessed Bartholomew Gutierrez
  - Blessed Brigida Morello Zancano
  - Mansuetus of Toul
  - Marinus
  - Phoebe
  - Pope Gregory I
  - Remaclus
  - Prudence Crandall (Episcopal Church (USA))
  - September 3 (Eastern Orthodox liturgics)
- China's victory over Japan commemoration related observances:
  - Armed Forces Day (Republic of China)
  - V-J Day (People's Republic of China)
- Feast of San Marino and the Republic, celebrates the foundation of the Republic of San Marino in 301.
- Flag Day (Australia)
- Independence Day, celebrates the second independence of Qatar from the United Kingdom in 1971.
- Levy Mwanawasa Day (Zambia)
- Merchant Navy Remembrance Day (Canada)
- Merchant Navy Day (United Kingdom)
- National Welsh Rarebit Day (United States)
- Tokehega Day (Tokelau, New Zealand)
