= Clasen =

Clasen is a German surname. Notable people with the surname include:

- Alvin J. Clasen (1892–1971), American politician
- Daniel Clasen (1622–1678), German political theorist, religious scholar, and classicist
- Helmut Clasen (born 1935), German-born Canadian motorcycle racer
- Henry J. Clasen (1829–1907), American politician
- Leo Clasen (1906–1972), German Holocaust survivor
