= List of shipwrecks in January 1883 =

The list of shipwrecks in January 1883 includes ships sunk, foundered, grounded, or otherwise lost during January 1883.

== 1 January ==
List of shipwrecks: 1 January 1883
Ship	State	Description
Congo	United Kingdom	The steamship was driven ashore in Druridge Bay. She was on a voyage from Calcutta, India to Dundee, Forfarshire.

== 2 January ==
List of shipwrecks: 2 January 1883
Ship	State	Description
Andreas Banck	Sweden	The ship put in to Danzig, Germany in a waterlogged condition and sank there. She was on a voyage from Västervik to Rochester, Kent, United Kingdom.
Lavinja	Germany	The barque was driven ashore 4 nautical miles (7.4 km) from Libava, Courland Governorate. She was on a voyage from Ventspils, Courland Governorate to Hull, Yorkshire, United Kingdom.
North America	Italy	The steamship struck a rock and foundered off Cape Palos, Spain. All on board were rescued. She was on a voyage from Buenos Aires, Argentina to Genoa.

== 3 January ==
List of shipwrecks: 3 January 1883
Ship	State	Description
Straits of Dover	United Kingdom	The steamship departed from Liverpool, Lancashire for Norfolk, Virginia, United States. No further trace, reported overdue.

-

== 4 January ==
List of shipwrecks: 4 January 1883
Ship	State	Description
Doris	Germany	The ship was sighted off Deal, Kent, United Kingdom whilst on a voyage from Pillau to Lisbon, Portugal. No further trace, reported missing.
Emma and Agnes	United Kingdom	The ship departed from Liverpool, Lancashire for Looe, Cornwall. No further trace, reported overdue.

== 5 January ==
List of shipwrecks: 5 January 1883
Ship	State	Description
Dunscore	United Kingdom	The ship collided with Persian Monarch (United Kingdom) and sank in the River Thames at Cubitt Town, Middlesex. She was refloated on 7 January.
Save All	United Kingdom	The fishing smack was run into by the steamship Empress (United Kingdom) and sank off the mouth of the Humber.

== 6 January ==
List of shipwrecks: 6 January 1883
Ship	State	Description
Pelican	United Kingdom	The Thames barge was run into by the steamship Telesilla (United Kingdom) and sank in the River Thames at Gravesend, Kent. Both crew were rescued by Telesilla.
Robert Williams	United Kingdom	The schooner ran aground at Slade, Glamorgan and was wrecked. Her crew were rescued by a coaster. She was on a voyage from Swansea to Abersoch, Glamorgan.

== 7 January ==
List of shipwrecks: 7 January 1883
Ship	State	Description
City of Brussels	United Kingdom	City of Brussels and Kirby Hall. The ocean liner collided with the steamship Kirby Hall (United Kingdom) in the River Mersey and cut in two. She sank with the loss of ten lives. Survivors were rescued by Kirby Hall. City of Brussels was on a voyage from New York, United States to Liverpool, Lancashire.
Enterprise	United Kingdom	The steamship ran aground on Jordan's Bank, in Liverpool Bay. She was on a voyage from Dundalk, County Louth to Liverpool. She was refloated and taken in to Liverpool.

== 8 January ==
List of shipwrecks: 8 January 1883
Ship	State	Description
guess	United Kingdom	The brigantine collided with a steamship and sank in the River Mersey at New Brighton, Cheshire. She was on a voyage from Liverpool, Lancashire to Dundalk, County Louth.

== 9 January ==
List of shipwrecks: 9 January 1883
Ship	State	Description
Glendoree	United Kingdom	The ship was abandoned in the Atlantic Ocean. She was on a voyage from Plymouth, Devon to A Coruña, Spain.
Parry's Lodge	United Kingdom	The schooner was wrecked on Pwll Du Point, Glamorgan, with the loss of her captain. She was on a voyage from Amlwch, Anglesey, to Swansea, Glamorgan.
Scawfell	United Kingdom	The barque foundered at sea. Her crew were rescued by the barque Rosedale (United Kingdom).

== 10 January ==
List of shipwrecks: 10 January 1883
Ship	State	Description
Sallie W. Kay	United States	The schooner was wrecked during a snowstorm 250 yards (230 m) off Ocean City, Maryland with the loss of one of her seven crew. Survivors were rescued by the United States Life-Saving Service. She was on a voyage from Baltimore, Maryland, to Boston, Massachusetts.
Unison	Germany	The barque sprang a leak and foundered in the Atlantic Ocean. Her crew were rescued by the barque Milan (Italy). Unison was on a voyage from Ardrossan, Ayrshire, United Kingdom to Puerto Rico.
William	United Kingdom	The Thames barge collided with the steamship Said (United Kingdom) and sank in the River Thames at Jenningtree Point with the loss of both crew. William was on a voyage from Wouldham, Kent to London.

== 11 January ==
List of shipwrecks: 11 January 1883
Ship	State	Description
Arzilla	United Kingdom	The ship foundered with some loss of life. Eleven survivors were rescued by Hindostan (United Kingdom).
Pride of the South	United Kingdom	The brigantine ran aground on the Bembridge Ledge, off the Isle of Wight. Her crew were rescued. She was on a voyage from Guernsey, Channel Islands to Portsmouth, Hampshire.

== 12 January ==
List of shipwrecks: 12 January 1883
Ship	State	Description
Henry's	Canada	The brig ran aground in the Solway Firth. She was on a voyage from Greenock, Renfrewshire, United Kingdom to Demerara, British Guiana. She was refloated and found to be leaky. Subsequently towed in to Maryport, Cumberland, United Kingdom.
Jessie Shuttleworth	United Kingdom	The ship was wrecked in a gale off Cape Tagmeriwelt, Morocco.
Libelle	Germany	The steamship was wrecked while entering the River Tyne off South Shields Her 29 passengers and crew were rescued by the Cullercoats Lifeboat. She was on a voyage from Bergen, Norway to the River Tyne.
Wild Deer	United Kingdom	The ship was wrecked on the North Rock, near Portaferry, County Down. All 209 passengers and 41 crew survived and taken ashore in fishing boats. They were landed at Clougher. She was on a voyage from Glasgow, Renfrewshire to New Zealand.

== 13 January ==
List of shipwrecks: 13 January 1883
Ship	State	Description
Carl Johann	Sweden	The ship departed from Swansea, Glamorgan, United Kingdom for Barbados. No further trace, reported missing.

== 15 January ==
List of shipwrecks: 15 January 1883
Ship	State	Description
Reindeer	United Kingdom	The fishing smack collided with the fishing smack Mary Gowland (United Kingdom) and sank in the North Sea.

== 16 January ==
List of shipwrecks: 16 January 1883
Ship	State	Description
Indus	United Kingdom	The steamship ran aground in the Seine near Berville-sur-Seine, Seine-Inférieure, France. She was on a voyage from Akyab, Burma to "Croisset", Seine-Inférieure.
Princesse Stephanie	Belgium	The steamship collided with the steamship Concha (Spain) off Lisbon, Portugal.

== 17 January ==
List of shipwrecks: 17 January 1883
Ship	State	Description
Francis Hixson	(United Kingdom) New South Wales	The 156 GRT tugboat grounded on her anchor at the bar of the Richmond River at Ballina, New South Wales, and became a wreck, while attempting to rescue the 33 GRT Platypus ( (United Kingdom) New South Wales), which survived.

-->

== 18 January ==
List of shipwrecks: 18 January 1883
Ship	State	Description
Cimbria	Germany	The Hammonia-class ocean liner ran aground in the Elbe. She was on a voyage from Hamburg to New York, United States. She was refloated with the assistance of the steamship Hansa (Germany) and resumed her voyage.
Lamperts	United Kingdom	The steamship was driven ashore at Cape Henry, Virginia, United States. She was on a voyage from Benisaf, Algeria to Baltimore, Maryland, United States.
Picardie	France	The steamship sprang a leak and sank off the Newfoundland Colony. Her crew were rescued by Labrador (Flag unknown). Picardie was on a voyage from New York to Havre de Grâce, Seine-Inférieure.

== 19 January ==
List of shipwrecks: 19 January 1883
Ship	State	Description
Cimbria and Sultan	Germany; United Kingdom	The Hammonia-class ocean liner Cimbria collided with the steamship Sultan and sank in the North Sea off Borkum with the loss of between 389 and 437 lives from the 490 people on board. Between 56 and 133 people were rescued by Diamant and Thetis (Flags unknown). Cimbria was on a voyage from Hamburg to New York, United States. Sultan rescued 39 people. She put in to Cuxhaven in a severely damaged condition.

== 20 January ==
List of shipwrecks: 20 January 1883
Ship	State	Description
Allan	United Kingdom	The schooner was wrecked on the Seal Carr Rock, off the coast of Berwickshire. Her crew survived.
Mariposa	United States	The brig was run down and sunk by the steamship Canima ( Canada and sank off Fisher's Island, New York with the loss of all but one of her crew.
Oranmore	United Kingdom	The steamship was driven ashore 10 nautical miles (19 km) from Baltimore, Maryland, United States. She was on a voyage from Baltimore to Liverpool, Lancashire. She was refloated and resumed her voyage.

== 21 January ==
List of shipwrecks: 21 January 1883
Ship	State	Description
Fra Francisco	Italy	The ship departed from Cardiff, Glamorgan, United Kingdom for Saint Vincent. No further trace, reported missing.
Inventa	Norway	The barque was driven ashore and wrecked at Thisted, Denmark. She was on a voyage from Liverpool, Lancashire, United Kingdom to Christiania.

== 22 January ==
List of shipwrecks: 22 January 1883
Ship	State	Description
Debonair	United Kingdom	The schooner was driven ashore at Helmsdale, Sutherland. She was refloated and beached.
Thistle	United Kingdom	The steamship ran aground on the Plough Rock, off the coast of Northumberland. Her crew were rescued by fishing cobles.
Thunder	United Kingdom	The steamship was severely damaged by fire at Hamburg, Germany.
Volante	Norway	The ship was driven ashore and wrecked on Læsø, Denmark. She was on a voyage from Rosehearty, Aberdeenshire, United Kingdom to Danzig, Germany.

== 23 January ==
List of shipwrecks: 23 January 1883
Ship	State	Description
Cyllenne	United Kingdom	The Thames barge foundered off Beachy Head, Sussex with the loss of all hands.

== 24 January ==
List of shipwrecks: 24 January 1883
Ship	State	Description
Abigail	United Kingdom	The brig sank in the Sound of Sanda. Her crew were rescued by the steamship Dunara Castle (United Kingdom). Abigail was on a voyage from Garston, Lancashire to Dublin.
Cunliffe	United Kingdom	The sloop sank at Hull, Yorkshire.
Forfarshire	United Kingdom	The ship ran aground at Dunkirk, Nord, France. She was on a voyage from San Francisco, California, United States to Dunkirk. She was refloated the next day with assistance.
Rebecca	United Kingdom	The schooner was driven ashore and wrecked at New Slains Castle, Aberdeenshire.
Water Lily, and William	United Kingdom	The smacks collided off Lowestoft, Suffolk with the loss of a crew member from one of the vessels. Water Lily sank, William was severely damaged.

== 25 January ==
List of shipwrecks: 25 January 1883
Ship	State	Description
Brothers	United Kingdom	The ship departed from Hartlepool, County Durham for London. No further trace, reported missing.
Cedric	United Kingdom	The steamship was driven ashore in Varna Bay.
Marseilles	United Kingdom	The steamship capsized at Newport, Monmouthshire. She was refloated on 27 January and drydocked the next day.
Sylvan	United Kingdom	The ship departed from the River Tyne for Almería, Spain. No further trace, reported overdue.

== 26 January ==
List of shipwrecks: 26 January 1883
Ship	State	Description
James Gray	United Kingdom	The steamship departed from Cardiff, Glamorgan for São Vicente, Cape Verde Islands. No further trace, reported overdue.
Janna	Netherlands	The brig struck The Manacles, Cornwall, United Kingdom. Her nine crew were rescued by Goodrievey Bay United Kingdom. Janna was on a voyage from Cardiff to the West Indies.
Kuras	United Kingdom	The brig was driven ashore near Crosby, Lancashire. She was refloated on 8 February.
Percy	United Kingdom	The sloop was wrecked off Merlimont, Pas-de-Calais, France. Her four crew were rescued.
Star of Hope	United States	The ship was wrecked at the mouth of the River Mersey. Her crew survived.

== 27 January ==
List of shipwrecks: 27 January 1883
Ship	State	Description
Agnes Jack	United Kingdom	The steamship foundered in the Bristol Channel off Port Eynon Point, Glamorgan, Wales, with the loss of her eighteen crew and her pilot. She was on a voyage from Cagliari, Sardinia, Italy, to Llanelli, Carmarthenshire.
Admiral Prinz Adalbert	Germany	The barque was driven ashore and wrecked near the Mumbles Lighthouse, Glamorgan, with the loss of one of her fifteen crew. See Wolverhampton.
Carl	Flag unknown	The ship foundered off the Shetland Islands, United Kingdom.
Chavarri	United Kingdom	The cargo ship departed from Swansea, Glamorgan for Savona, Italy. Presumed foundered with the loss of all hands, and probably sank on 28 January. Wreckage from the ship came ashore at St. Ann's Head, Pembrokeshire on 17 February.
Crimea	United Kingdom	The schooner was driven ashore and wrecked at Kilkeel, County Down. Her crew were rescued. She was on a voyage from Kilkeel to Carmarthen.
Earnest, Eva, Hope; Joseph, Marabout, Mary Ann Mandall; Roma, and Wilson	United Kingdom	Marabout was driven from her moorings at Barrow-in-Furness, Lancashire and was driven into the schooner's Earnest, Eva, Hope, Joseph, Mary Ann Mandall, Roma and Wilson, (all United Kingdom, which were all damaged.
Freundschaft	Germany	The brig foundered in the North Sea. Her crew were rescued by the schooner Sara (Germany). Freundschaft was on a voyage from West Wemyss, Fife, United Kingdom to Geestemünde.
James	United Kingdom	The schooner sank at Stranraer, Wigtownshire. Her crew survived.
James	United Kingdom	The schooner collided with the tug Talisman (United Kingdom) and sank in Loch Ryan.
James Grey	United Kingdom	The steamship was wrecked on the Tusker Rock in the Bristol Channel with the loss of all hands, about twenty lives.
Johanne	Denmark	The schooner foundered off the coast of Norfolk, United Kingdom. Her five crew survived. She was on a voyage from Halmstad, Sweden to Wisbech, Cambridgeshire, United Kingdom.
Kelso	United Kingdom	The schooner was found bottom up off Cardiff, Glamorgan. The fate of the crew is not known.
Mangerton	United Kingdom	The steamship departed from Garston, Lancashire of Havana, Cuba. No further trace, reported missing.
Nicholson	(United Kingdom of Great Britain and Ireland) Guernsey	The brig was abandoned in the North Sea. Her crew were rescued by the smack Gripper Banks (United Kingdom). Nicholson was on a voyage from South Shields, County Durham to Guernsey.
Percy	United Kingdom	The schooner was driven ashore and wrecked at Boulogne-sur-Mer, Pas-de-Calais, France.
Royal Sovereign	United Kingdom	The ship was wrecked. Her crew were rescued.
Washington	Germany	The ship foundered off the Shetland Islands.
Wolverhampton	Royal National Lifeboat Institution	The lifeboat capsized near the Mumbles while going to the rescue of Admiral Prinz Adalbert (Germany) with the loss of four of her six crew. She was declared a total loss and was replaced by another lifeboat bearing the same name.
Unnamed'	Flag unknown	The ship foundered in the Irish Sea off Blackpool, Lancashire, United Kingdom.

== 28 January ==
List of shipwrecks: 28 January 1883
Ship	State	Description
Adelgrunde	Norway	The barque was driven ashore at Fleetwood, Lancashire, United Kingdom. She was on a voyage from Liverpool, Lancashire to Halifax, Nova Scotia, Canada.
Alice	Germany	The schooner was driven ashore at "Caloothone". She was on a voyage from Antwerp, Belgium to Hamburg.
Carnet	France	The schooner was driven ashore at Kamperduin, North Holland, Netherlands. Her crew were rescued. She was on a voyage from Maldon, Essex to Plymouth, Devon, United Kingdom.
Lord Cardigan	United Kingdom	The steamship departed from Newport, Monmouthshire for Waterford. No further trace, reported missing.
Sirene	Russia	The barque was driven ashore and wrecked at Kopervik, Norway. She was on a voyage from Bo'ness, Lothian, United Kingdom to Norrköping, Norway.
Son of Rechab	United Kingdom	The sloop was wrecked near St Mary's Holm, Orkney Islands. Her crew survived. She was on a voyage from Kirkwall, Orkney Islands to Stornoway, Isle of Lewis, Outer Hebrides.
St Columba	United Kingdom	The vessel left Penarth, Glamorgan with a cargo of coal destined for Bombay, India. She subsequently foundered in the Bay of Biscay with the loss of all hands, including that of Rangers F.C. founder, Peter Campbell.
Unnamed	Flag unknown	The barque was driven ashore a few miles from Southport, Lancashire, United Kingdom. Her crew were rescued.

== 29 January ==
List of shipwrecks: 29 January 1883
Ship	State	Description
Argo	Italy	The barque was driven ashore at Ballycotton, County Cork, United Kingdom.
Bywell Castle	United Kingdom	The steamship was sighted off Cabo Caboviero whilst on a voyage from Alexandria, Egypt to Hull, Yorkshire. No further trace, presumed foundered with the loss of all hands. She may have foundered in the Bay of Biscay, or have been wrecked on the Haisborough Sands, in the North Sea off the coast of Norfolk in February 1883.
Kate	United Kingdom	The ship was abandoned in the North Sea. Her crew were rescued by the smack Beaconsfield (United Kingdom). Kate was on a voyage from Berwick upon Tweed, Northumberland to Shoreham-by-Sea, Sussex.
Larache	United Kingdom	The schooner was wrecked at Mogador, Morocco. Her crew were rescued.
Plassey	United Kingdom	The ship was driven ashore at Hythe, Kent. Her crew were rescued by rocket apparatus. She was on a voyage from Demerara, British Guiana to London.
Whitehaven Lass	United Kingdom	The barque was driven ashore and wrecked 1 nautical mile (1.9 km) north of Whitehaven, Cumberland. Her crew were rescued. She was on a voyage from Cartagena, Spain to Workington, Cumberland.

== 30 January ==
List of shipwrecks: 30 January 1883
Ship	State	Description
Edda	United Kingdom	The steamship was driven ashore at Sprogø, Denmark. She was on a voyage from Newcastle upon Tyne, Northumberland to Korsør, Denmark.
Ernest Wood	United Kingdom	The schooner sank in the Humber. Her crew were rescued. She was on a voyage from Hull, Yorkshire to Grimbsy, Lincolnshire.
Glan Menai	United Kingdom	The ship departed from Port Penrhyn, Caernarfonshire for Coleraine, County Antrim. No further trace, reported missing.
Grace	United States	The steamer sank in a collision with Luray (United States) in dense fog off Sewell's Point, Virginia with the loss of a crew member.
Madagascar	United Kingdom	The steamship ran aground in the Suez Canal.
Pavian	Flag unknown	The ship departed from "Passeroean", Java, Netherlands East Indies for Montreal, Quebec, Canada. No further trace, reported overdue.
Unnamed	Flag unknown	The brigantine foundered 1 nautical mile (1.9 km) off Brancaster, Norfolk, United Kingdom. .

== 31 January ==
List of shipwrecks: 31 January 1883
Ship	State	Description
Craigton	United Kingdom	The steamship was damaged by fire at Greenock, Renfrewshire.
Jutland	United Kingdom	The steamship collided with another steamship at Blackwall, Middlesex and was severely damaged. She was consequently beached. She was on a voyage from Terneuen, Zeeland, Netherlands to London.
Lass o'Doon	United Kingdom	The schooner was driven ashore on Terschelling, Friesland, Netherlands. Her crew were rescued. She was on a voyage from Newcastle upon Tyne, Northumberland to Rotterdam, south Holland, Netherlands.
Tide	Portugal	The barque was wrecked at Esposende. Her crew were rescued. She was on a voyage from New York, United States to Porto.

== Unknown date ==
List of shipwrecks: Unknown date in January 1883
Ship	State	Description
Adelaide	United Kingdom	The brigantine was driven ashore in the western Solent. She was on a voyage from Newcastle upon Tyne, Northumberland to Exeter, Devon.
Alpin	United Kingdom	The steamship was driven ashore at Philadelphia, Pennsylvania, United States.
Alvin	Spain	The steamship was wrecked on the coast of Virginia, United States. All on board were rescued. She was later refloated and taken in to Lewes, Delaware, United States.
Amélie	France	The steamship was lost in the Gulf of Lyons off Port Catte on or before 4 January. All on board, two passengers and 25 crew lost their lives. She was on a voyage from Cette, Hérault to Marseille, Bouches-du-Rhône.
Avon	United Kingdom	The smack foundered in the North Sea. Her crew were rescued by the smack Daisy (United Kingdom). Avon was on a voyage from South Shields, County Durham to London.
Bracadaile	United Kingdom	The steamship ran aground at Garmoyle, County Antrim. She was on a voyage from New York, United States to Belfast, County Antrim. She was refloated and completed her voyage.
Burgermeister de Waal	Netherlands	The steamship ran aground on the Schoudenwestplaat and was severely damaged. She was later refloated.
Cainan	United Kingdom	The ship .
Calamidas	Greece	The brig was wrecked at Chipiona, Spain with the loss of three of her crew. She was on a voyage from Seville, Spain to an English port.
Dagman	Germany	The ship was driven ashore and wrecked at "Kainit", South Carolina. She was on a voyage from Hamburg to Charleston, South Carolina.
Dare	United Kingdom	The brigantine ran aground on the Barber Sand, in the North Sea off the coast of Norfolk. Her six crew were rescued by the Caister Lifeboat.
Eaglet	United Kingdom	The ship was abandoned in the North Sea. Her crew were rescued by the fishing smack Teaser (United Kingdom).
Eden	United Kingdom	The steamship ran aground on the Sunderland Bank, in the Irish Sea off the coast of Lancashire.
Fidélité	France	The ship was driven ashore at Lackeen Point, County Tipperary, United Kingdom. She was on a voyage from Liverpool, Lancashire to Sierra Leone. She subsequently broke up.
Fred E. Scammell	United States	The ship was driven ashore. She was later refloated and taken in to New York in a leaky condition.
Frens	United Kingdom	The smack was abandoned. Her three crew were rescued by the Moelfre Lifeboat.
Friedrich Wilhelm IV	Germany	The barque was driven ashore on Hveen, Sweden. She was on a voyage from Hull to Wismar. She was refloated and put in to Helsingør, Denmark.
Inflexible	United Kingdom	The steamship collided with the steamship Clan Ogilvie and sank at Bombay, India before 26 January. She was refloated.
Kawe	United Kingdom	The ship foundered in the North Sea off Tayport, Fife. She was on a voyage from Algiers, Algeria to a British port.
Laura	Portugal	The barque was driven ashore near Porto. She was on a voyage from Havre de Grâce, Seine-Inférieure, France to Porto.
Margaret Gunn	United Kingdom	The schooner was wrecked in the Pentland Firth. Her seven crew were rescued by the Huna Lifeboat.
Mattie B. Russell	United States	The ship was abandoned in the Atlantic Ocean before 19 January.
Nanteos	United Kingdom	The schooner was wrecked. Her four crew were rescued by the Littlehaven Lifeboat.
Perseveranza	Flag unknown	The ship was driven ashore at Porth Neigwl, Caernarfonshire, United Kingdom. She was on a voyage from Pensacola, Florida, United States to Greenock, Renfrewshire.
Plantain	United Kingdom	The steamship ran aground at IJmuiden, North Holland, Netherlands. She was on a voyage from Calcutta, India to Amsterdam, North Holland. She was refloated.
Portland	United Kingdom	The schooner was driven ashore near Portmadoc, Caernarfonshire. Her crew were rescued. She was on a voyage from Waterford to Cardiff, Glamorgan. She was refloated on 6 February and taken in to Portmadoc.
Pride of the Ocean	(United Kingdom of Great Britain and Ireland) Gibraltar	The ship was wrecked on the Shipwash Sand, in the North Sea off the coast of Suffolk between 8 and 12 January with the presumed loss of all 22 crew. She was on a voyage from Hamburg, Germany to New York.
Racilia	United Kingdom	The steamship was driven ashore at Stubben, Denmark. She was on a voyage from Reval, Russia to London.
Resolut	Flag unknown	The barque departed New York, United States for Bremen, Germany, on 22 January and later was spoken to in the North Atlantic Ocean south of Newfoundland at 42°N 56°W. She subsequently disappeared.
Rio Douro	Portugal	The steamship was driven ashore near Porto. She was on a voyage from Antwerp, Belgium to Porto. She was refloated and taken in to Porto.
Waesland	Belgium	The steamship ran aground in the Zuidergat near Vlissingen, Zeeland, Netherlands. She was later refloated with assistance.
William H. Joyce	United States	The fishing schooner sank in a gale off the Newfoundland Colony with the loss of all eight crew.
Wilton	United Kingdom	The steamship was driven ashore in Chesapeake Bay. She was on a voyage from Benisaf, Algeria to Baltimore.
Wisconsin	United Kingdom	The steamship ran aground. She was on a voyage from New York to Liverpool. She was refloated and resumed her voyage.
Zephyr	United Kingdom	The steamship was driven ashore. She was on a voyage from Garston, Lancashire to Waterford. She was refloated and take in to Liverpool on 17 January.
Unnamed	Flag unknown	The schooner collided with the schooner May Flower (United Kingdom) and sank 6 nautical miles (11 km) south west by south of St. Ann's Head, Pembrokeshire, United Kingdom.
Unnamed	United Kingdom	The lighter sank at San Francisco, California.
Unnamed	Flag unknown	The brig ran aground on the Nore. She was refloated.
