= List of shipwrecks in February 1873 =

The list of shipwrecks in February 1873 includes ships sunk, foundered, grounded, or otherwise lost during February 1873.

== 1 February ==
List of shipwrecks: 1 February 1873
Ship	State	Description
Clan Alpine	United Kingdom	The steamship was wrecked on Black Head, Cornwall with the loss of thirteen of the 30 people on board. She was on a voyage from Antwerp, Belgium to Liverpool, Lancashire.
Clotilde	France	The lugger foundered off Hartland Point, Devon, United Kingdom. Her crew were rescued by the steamship Hampshire (United Kingdom).
Dasher	United Kingdom	The schooner was driven ashore and wrecked at the Old Head of Kinsale, County Cork.
Eastwood	Canada	The ship departed from Saint John's, Newfoundland Colony for Lisbon, Portugal. No further trace, presumed foundered with the loss of all hands.
Humber	United Kingdom	The ship was driven ashore and wrecked on Grand Manan, New Brunswick, Canada. She was on a voyage from Saint John, New Brunswick to London. The wreck was refloated on 4 February and towed in to Whale's Cove.
James	United Kingdom	The schooner was driven ashore at Donaghadee, County Down.
Jeune Austerlitz	France	The ship ran aground in the Isles of Scilly, United Kingdom and was abandoned by her crew. She was on a voyage from Cardiff, Glamorgan, United Kingdom to Brest, Finistère. She was refloated on 3 February and taken in to New Grimsby, Isles of Scilly.
Josephine Anais	France	The schooner was driven ashore in Cawsand Bay. She was on a voyage from Dunkirk, Nord to Cardiff.
Laura	Netherlands	The barque collided with the steamship Periere (France) 15 nautical miles (28 km) west of Holyhead, Anglesey, United Kingdom and was abandoned in a waterlogged condition. Ten of her twelve crew were rescued by Periere, the other two were reported missing. Laura was on a voyage from Stettin to Barrow-in-Furness, Lancashire.
Marie Emiline	France	The ship was driven ashore in Mounts Bay. Her crew were rescued by a lifeboat.
Mary T. Young	United States	The fishing schooner went ashore three miles below Race Point Light, and became a total loss. Crew saved.
M. McFarlane	United Kingdom	The ship was driven ashore in the Currituck Inlet. She was on a voyage from London to Baltimore, Maryland. She was a total loss.
Rambler	United Kingdom	The ship foundered in the Irish Sea 15 nautical miles (28 km) south south west of Cork. Her crew were rescued by Nerio ( (United Kingdom of Great Britain and Ireland) Jersey). Rambler was on a voyage from Newport, Monmouthshire to Cork.
Regeneration	France	The barque was driven ashore at Mizen Head, County Wicklow, United Kingdom. Her crew were rescued. She was on a voyage from a French port to Belfast, County Antrim, United Kingdom.
Sarah	United Kingdom	The brig was wrecked at Balbriggan, County Dublin with the loss of all five crew. The RNLI Skerries Lifeboat capsized whilst going to her assistance, with the loss of six of her ten crew.
Sophia	Netherlands	The schooner ran aground on the Pye Sand, in the North Sea off the coast of Essex, United Kingdom. She was on a voyage from Saint Petersburg, Russia to Bordeaux, Gironde, France. She was refloated on 15 January and towed in to Harwich, Essex by the tug Gleaner (United Kingdom).
Tres Adelphi	Trieste	The ship was driven ashore at Cape Pala, Sardinia, Italy. She was on a voyage from Trieste to London. She was refloated on 6 February.
Trot	United Kingdom	The schooner was driven ashore and wrecked in Glandore, County Cork, or at Landore, Glamorgan. Her crew were rescued. She was on a voyage from New York, United States to Glasgow, Renfrewshire.
Woodham	Norway	The steamship ran aground on the Chilton Ledges, off the Isle of Wight, United Kingdom. Her nineteen crew were rescued by the Brightstone Lodge Lifeboat. She was on a voyage from Newcastle upon Tyne, Northumberland, United Kingdom to New York, United States. Woodham was refloated on 27 April with assistance from the tugs Camel, Grinder (both United Kingdom), Robin Hood and Victoria (both United Kingdom) and taken in to Portsmouth, Hampshire, United Kingdom, where she sank.
Young Marquis	United Kingdom	The brigantine struck a floating baulk of timber in the Bay of Biscay and was abandoned by her crew. She was on a voyage from Cardiff to Seville, Spain.

== 2 February ==
List of shipwrecks: 2 February 1873
Ship	State	Description
Acclere, and Henriette	France	The brig Acclere was driven into Henriette at Penarth, Glamorgan, United Kingdom. Both vessels were severely damaged and were beached. Acclere was on a voyage from Saint-Malo, Ille-et-Vilaine to Cardiff, Glamorgan. Henriette was on a voyage from Caen, Calvados to Gloucester, United Kingdom.
Ada	United Kingdom	The ship was driven ashore at Malahide, County Dublin. She was on a voyage from Liverpool, Lancashire to Dublin. She was refloated on 12 February and taken in to Dublin.
Aimable Rose	France	The ship was wrecked at Le Conquet, Finistère with the loss of all but three of her crew.
Alarm	United Kingdom	The barque was abandoned in the Atlantic Ocean (41°45′N 43°08′W). Her twenty crew were rescued by Tre Sostre (Flag unknown). Alarm was on a voyage from Pensacola, Florida, United States to Liverpool.
Albert, or Alert	United Kingdom	The ship was wrecked at Porthdinllaen, Caernarfonshire. Her crew were rescued. She was on a voyage from Liverpool to Penzance, Cornwall.
Aneurin	United Kingdom	The ship was wrecked at Porthdinllaen. Her crew were rescued. She was on a voyage from Poole, Dorset to Runcorn, Cheshire.
Anna Agathe	France	The ship was driven ashore at Cardiff.
Belle	United Kingdom	The schooner sank off the Bishop Rock, Isles of Scilly. Her crew were rescued by the steamship John Cory (United Kingdom). Belle was on a voyage from Newport, Monmouthshire to Harrington, Cumberland.
Bois Chollet	France	The brig was wrecked at "Porsmoguer", Loire-Inférieure. She was on a voyage from Cádiz, Spain to Brest, Finistère.
Catherine	United Kingdom	The ship foundered off Penarth with the loss of all six crew. She was on a voyage from Gloucester and/or Lydney, Gloucestershire to Cardiff.
Catherine	United Kingdom	The schooner sank at Holyhead, Anglesey. She was on a voyage from Bangor, Caernarfonshire to Dublin.
City of Rotterdam	United Kingdom	The schooner collided with the steamship Hansa (Germany) and sank in the Humber. Her crew were rescued.
Covent Garden	Royal National Lifeboat Institution	The lifeboat was driven ashore at Porthminster, Cornwall whilst going to the assistance of the schooners Mary Ann and Rambler (both United Kingdom). She was refloated and completed her mission.
Covent Garden	Royal National Lifeboat Institution	The lifeboat was driven ashore a second time. She was going to the assistance of the brig Francis (United Kingdom). She was refloated and completed her mission.
Daniele Manin	Italy	The barque foundered in the Irish Sea 23 nautical miles (43 km) north west of Holyhead, Anglesey, United Kingdom with the loss of eight of the thirteen people on board. Survivors were rescued by Margaret (United Kingdom). Daniele Manin was on a voyage from Alexandria, Egypt to Liverpool.
Deux Sœurs et Marie	France	The ship was lost in the Bay of Ilieu. Her crew were rescued. She was on a voyage from Cardiff to Brest.
Eliza	United Kingdom	The schooner was driven ashore and wrecked at Cardiff.
Emilie	Norway	The schooner was driven ashore and wrecked at Wick, Caithness, United Kingdom. Her crew were rescued.
Erin	Austria-Hungary	The brig was driven ashore and wrecked at Penarth. She was on a voyage from Gloucester to Cardiff.
Euphémie	France	The schooner was driven ashore and wrecked at "Parthgwidder", near St. Ives, Cornwall. Her crew were rescued by the St. Ives Lifeboat Covent Garden ( Royal National Lifeboat Institution).
Francis	United Kingdom	The brig was driven ashore and wrecked at St. Ives. Her six crew were rescued by the St. Ives Lifeboat Convent Garden ( Royal National Lifeboat Institution).
Friend's Endeavour	United Kingdom	The smack was driven ashore and wrecked at Portland, Dorset.
G. and W. Jones	United Kingdom	The ship was run ashore at Angle, Pembrokeshire. She was on a voyage from Glasgow, Renfrewshire to Hayle, Cornwall. She was refloated on 14 February.
Iris	France	The schooner was driven ashore at Portland, Dorset, United Kingdom.
John and Mary	United Kingdom	The ship collided with a Greek brig and was abandoned by her crew, who were rescued by the brig. She was subsequently taken in to the Isles of Scilly.
John Scott	United Kingdom	The brig was driven ashore and wrecked at Kilcoole, County Wicklow with the loss of all but one of her seven crew. She was on a voyage from Whitehaven, Cumberland to Kingstown, County Dublin.
John Smith	United Kingdom	The ship was wrecked on the coast of County Wicklow with the loss of all six crew.
Leon Marie	France	The cutter was wrecked on Guernsey, Channel Islands.
Mary	United Kingdom	The barque was driven ashore at the Mumbles. She was on a voyage from Swansea to Alexandria, Egypt.
Maria Natalia	Russia	The ship was driven ashore at Great Yarmouth, Norfolk, United Kingdom. All nine people on board were rescued by the Great Yarmouth Lifeboat. She was on a voyage from Helsingborg, Sweden to Penarth.
Mary Ann	United Kingdom	The schooner was driven ashore and wrecked at St. Ives, Cornwall. Her five crew were rescued by the St. Ives Lifeboat Covent Garden ( Royal National Lifeboat Institution).
Mathilde	Austria-Hungary	The barque foundered in the Atlantic Ocean. Her crew were rescued by Maury (United Kingdom). Mathilde was on a voyage from Cardiff to Trieste.
Mincarlo	United Kingdom	The ship was wrecked at Porthdinllaen. Her crew were rescued. She was on a voyage from Runcorn to Poole.
Miss Madocks	United Kingdom	The ship was wrecked at Porthdinllaen. Her crew were rescued. She was on a voyage from Caernarfon to Swansea, Glamorgan.
Monarch	(United Kingdom of Great Britain and Ireland) Guernsey	The ship was driven ashore at Fowey, Cornwall. Her crew were rescued by the Fowey Lifeboat. She was refloated the next day.
Orich	Austria-Hungary	The ship was driven ashore at Penarth. She was on a voyage from Gloucester to Cardiff.
Penseé	France	The ship was wrecked at "Porsmoguer". She was on a voyage from Cádiz to Bordeaux, Gironde.
Pierre Marie	France	The ship sank at St. Ives.
Polmaise	United Kingdom	The barque was wrecked. She was on a voyage from Rockhampton, Queensland to London.
Rambler	United Kingdom	The schooner was driven ashore and wrecked at St. Ives with the loss of two of her three crew. The survivor was rescued by the St. Ives Lifeboat Covent Garden ( Royal National Lifeboat Institution).
Rose	United Kingdom	The schooner was driven ashore and wrecked at Penzance, Cornwall. Her crew were rescued by a pilot boat.
Satellite	United Kingdom	The full-rigged ship sprang a leak and foundered in the Atlantic Ocean 120 nautical miles (220 km) off the Isles of Scilly. Two of her crew were reported missing. Thirteen survivors were rescued by the steamship Bywell Castle (United Kingdom). The next day, the ship was discovered in a sinking condition by Lindsay (United Kingdom). Only her captain and cook were on board; her cook was rescued by Lindsay but her captain refused to leave. Satellite was on a voyage from Cardiff to Rio de Janeiro, Brazil.
Stag	United Kingdom	The schooner was driven ashore and wrecked at Clovelly, Devon. Her three crew were rescued after a man swam out to the ship with a lifeline. She was on a voyage from Newport, Monmouthshire to Barnstaple, Devon.
St. Malo	France	The ship was wrecked at "Porsmoguer". She was on a voyage from Cádiz to Saint-Nazaire, Loire-Inférieure.
Una	United Kingdom	The smack collided with the smack British Lass and was beached at Portland. She was on a voyage from Fareham, Hampshire to Jersey, Channel Islands.
Wemyss	United Kingdom	The schooner foundered in St Andrews Bay with the loss of all four crew.
Wilson	United Kingdom	The schooner was driven ashore at Drogheda, County Louth. Her crew were rescued by the Drogheda Lifeboat. She was on a voyage from Whitehaven, Cumberland to Cardiff.

== 3 February ==
List of shipwrecks: 3 February 1873
Ship	State	Description
Anglian	United Kingdom	The steamship was abandoned off the Longships, Cornwall in a sinking condition. Her crew were rescued by the steamship Marina (United Kingdom). Anglian was towed in to Penzance, Cornwall by the steamship Grebe (United Kingdom) the next day.
Eugene	United Kingdom	The ship was driven ashore at Dale, Pembrokeshire.
Friend's Endeavour	United Kingdom	The smack was driven ashore and wrecked at Portland, Dorset.
James R. Bayley	United Kingdom	The schooner capsized off Puffin Island, Anglesey with the loss of all hands. She drove onto the Dutchman's Bank and was wrecked. She was on a voyage from São Miguel Island, Azores to a British port.
Josephine Louise	France	The lugger was wrecked at Cawsand, Devon, United Kingdom. Her crew were rescued. She was on a voyage from Antwerp, Belgium to Cardiff, Glamorgan, United Kingdom.
Knight Templar	United Kingdom	The steamship foundered 80 nautical miles (150 km) off The Lizard, Cornwall. Her crew were rescued by Gateside (United Kingdom). Knight Templar was on her maiden voyage, from Cardiff to Bombay, India.
Maria Saletta	United Kingdom	The ship was abandoned in the Atlantic Ocean. Her three crew were rescued by Aurora (United Kingdom). Maria Saletta was on a voyage from Liverpool, Lancashire to Philadelphia, Pennsylvania, United States.
Mary Russell	United Kingdom	The brig was driven ashore at Dunwich, Suffolk.
Mio Moro	Austria-Hungary	The brig was abandoned in the Atlantic Ocean. Her crew were rescued by City of Brooklyn (United States). Mio Moro was on a voyage from Cardiff to Trieste.
Neptun	Norway	The ship was driven ashore at Winterton-on-Sea, Norfolk, United Kingdom. She was on a voyage from Grimstad to Philadelphia.
Reste	Spain	The brigantine foundered at sea. Her crew were rescued by the steamship Lisbon (United Kingdom). Reste was on a voyage from Liverpool to Havana, Cuba.
Rose	United Kingdom	The ship was wrecked at Penzance, Cornwall.
Sarpsborg	Norway	The barque ran aground on the Goodwin Sands, Kent, United Kingdom. The Ramsgate Lifeboat Bradford ( Royal National Lifeboat Institution) lost a crew member going to her assistance. Sarpsborg was on a voyage from Christiania to Cardiff. She was refloated with the assistance of the Kingsdown and Ramsgate Lifeboats and proceeded for London, United Kingdom.
Sytende Mai	Norway	The schooner was driven ashore south of Seaton Carew, County Durham, United Kingdom. Her seven crew were rescued by the Seaton Carew Lifeboat Charlotte ( Royal National Lifeboat Institution).
Thomas	United Kingdom	The ship was driven ashore at Dale.
Tryphemia	United Kingdom	The ship was driven ashore at Dale. She was later refloated.
Violette	France	The schooner was driven ashore and wrecked at Mouth Mill, between Clovelly and Hartland Point, Devon. Her crew were rescued. She was on a voyage from Falmouth, Cornwall to Swansea, Glamorgan.
Windsor	United Kingdom	The steamship ran aground in the Rock Channel. Her 60 passengers and some of her crew were taken off by the Hoylake Lifeboat. She was on a voyage from Liverpool, Lancashire to Dublin.
Unnamed	Flag unknown	The brigantine foundered in heavy seas on the Seven Stones Reef, between the Isles of Scilly and Cornwall with the loss of all hands. The schooner Aimable Jeanie (France) was unable to provide assistance.
Unnamed	United Kingdom	The schooner was wrecked on the Dutchman's Bank, in the Irish Sea.

== 4 February ==
List of shipwrecks: 4 February 1873
Ship	State	Description
Annie Forster	United Kingdom	The full-rigged ship sprang a leak and foundered. Her crew were rescued. She was on a voyage from London to Dakar, Senegal.
Cesarea	United Kingdom	The ship was abandoned in the Atlantic Ocean. Her crew were rescued by Crown Prince ( Canada). Cesarea was on a voyage from the Bull River to Belfast, County Antrim.
Kaloolah	United Kingdom	The brigantine was wrecked at "Welcoombe Mouth", near Bideford, Devon. Her crew were rescued. She was on a voyage from Lydney, Gloucestershire to Cork.
Leonidas	United States	The ship was abandoned at sea. Her crew were rescued by Beagle (United Kingdom). Leonidas was on a voyage from Newport, Monmouthshire, United Kingdom to New Orleans, Louisiana.
Sorinto	Norway	The barque ran aground in the Whittaker Channel, off the coast of Essex, United Kingdom. She was on a voyage from Christiania to Colchester, Essex. She was refloated and resumed her voyage.
Wilhelmine	United Kingdom	The ship was abandoned at sea. Her crew were rescued by Felina (Spain). Wilhelmine was on a voyage from Larache, Morocco to Falmouth, Cornwall.
Windsor	United Kingdom	The steamship was driven ashore near Liverpool, Lancashire. The Hoylake Lifeboat took off 80 passengers. She was on a voyage from Liverpool to Dublin.

== 5 February ==
List of shipwrecks: 5 February 1873
Ship	State	Description
Bons Amis	France	The ship was wrecked near "Cinguet", Finistère. She was on a voyage from Swansea, Glamorgan, United Kingdom to Caen, Calvados.
Emilie Castel Marie	Italy	The barque foundered off Long Island, New York, United States with the loss of six of her nine crew.
Maria	United Kingdom	The schooner was driven ashore at Dungeness, Kent. She was on a voyage from Dublin to Antwerp, Belgium.
Mona's Isle	(United Kingdom of Great Britain and Ireland) Isle of Man	The paddle steamer ran aground at Ashton, Renfrewshire but got off the same day, undamaged. She was on a voyage to Glasgow, Renfrewshire from the Isle of Man.
Rosalie	Sweden	The barque was abandoned in the Atlantic Ocean. Her crew were rescued by North Star (United Kingdom). Rosalie was on a voyage from New Orleans, Louisiana, United States to Londonderry, United Kingdom.

== 6 February ==
List of shipwrecks: 6 February 1873
Ship	State	Description
Anna Mathilde	Russia	The schooner was wrecked at Brekkestø, Norway. She was on a voyage from Newcastle upon Tyne, Northumberland, United Kingdom to Malmö. Sweden.
Clara	United Kingdom	The barque was driven ashore in a hurricane at Mauritius. She was refloated the next day.
Daisy	United Kingdom	The tug struck a submerged object and sank in the Clyde at Port Glasgow, Renfrewshire. She was refloated on 8 February and taken in to Greenock, Renfrewshire for repairs.
Grebe	United Kingdom	The steamship ran aground in the Clyde. She was on a voyage from Antwerp, Belgium to Glasgow, Renfrewshire. She was refloated on 9 February and taken in to Glasgow.
Joseph Cape	United Kingdom	The barque was wrecked at Nohoval, County Cork with the loss of all hands.
Mines de Soumah	France	The ship sank off "Ayck", Nord. Her crew were rescued. She was on a voyage from Newcastle upon Tyne to Algiers, Algeria.
Peru	United Kingdom	The full-rigged ship was partly abandoned in the Bay of Biscay. Eight of her 21 crew were taken off by the steamship West (United Kingdom). The remaining crew were rescued the next day by Invictor (United Kingdom). Peru was on a voyage from Cardiff, Glamorgan to Rio de Janeiro, Brazil.
Pomona	Netherlands	The ship was abandoned off the coast of Finistère, France. Her crew were rescued. She was Vlaardingen, South Holland to Lisbon, Portugal. She was subsequently taken in to Brest, Finistère.
Racer	United Kingdom	The barque was driven ashore in a hurricane at Mauritius. She was refloated.
Zuleika	United Kingdom	The ship was abandoned in the Atlantic Ocean. Her crew were rescued by Leila Alice (United States). Zuleika was on a voyage from Liverpool, Lancashire to São Miguel Island, Azores.

== 7 February ==
List of shipwrecks: 7 February 1873
Ship	State	Description
Adele et Marie	France	The sloop was wrecked in the Bay of Leque. Her crew were rescued.
Emile Ernest	France	The schooner was wrecked at "Penhois", Finistère with the loss of all but two of her crew. She was on a voyage from Cardiff, Glamorgan, United Kingdom to Marans, Charente-Inférieure.
Ersilias	Italy	The ship foundered. Her crew survived. She was on a voyage from Cardiff to Pola.
Gitana	Germany	The brig was driven ashore at Portsmouth, Hampshire, United Kingdom. She was on a voyage from Memel to Southampton, Hampshire.
Île d'Arais	France	The lugger sank north west of the Longships, Cornwall, United Kingdom. Her crew were rescued. She was on a voyage from Cardiff to Quimper, Finistère.
Mansanito	United Kingdom	The barque foundered in the Atlantic Ocean. Her crew were rescued by the barque Brestrusbrund (Norway). Mansanito was on a voyage from a port in Georgia, United States to Newcastle upon Tyne, Northumberland.
Sacra Famiglia	Austria-Hungary	The barque was abandoned in the Atlantic Ocean 100 nautical miles (190 km) west by south of The Lizard, Cornwall, United Kingdom. Her crew were rescued by Impulse (United Kingdom). Sacra Famiglia was on a voyage from Liverpool, Lancashire, United Kingdom to Barcelona, Spain.

== 8 February ==
List of shipwrecks: 8 February 1873
Ship	State	Description
Arab	United Kingdom	The brigantine collided with the Cockle Lightship ( Royal National Lifeboat Institution) and was abandoned by her crew. She was towed in to Lowestoft, Suffolk in a derelict condition by a tug and the Gorleston Lifeboat.
Avalon	Netherlands	The steamship ran aground at Brielle, South Holland. She was on a voyage from Havana, Cuba to Rotterdam, South Holland.
Elvizia	Italy	The ship was wrecked on the Haisborough Sands, in the North Sea off the coast of Norfolk, United Kingdom. Her crew were rescued. She was onh a voyage from South Shields, County Durham, United Kingdom to Civita Vecchia.
Kate	United Kingdom	The steamship sank off the Cork Sand, in the North Sea off the coast of Suffolk with the loss of three of her six crew. Survivors were rescued by the smacks Perseverance and Vigilant (both United Kingdom). Kate was on a voyage from Middlesbrough, Yorkshire to London.
Savannah	United States	The barque was wrecked on the Soreno Keys, off the Virgin Islands. Her crew were rescued. She was on a voyage from Philadelphia, Pennsylvania to Barbados.
Young Alfred	United Kingdom	The brigantine was abandoned in the Bay of Biscay. Her crew were rescued by the steamship Bywell Castle (United Kingdom).

== 9 February ==
List of shipwrecks: 9 February 1873
Ship	State	Description
Frigga	Norway	The brigantine was wrecked at Tenby, Pembrokeshire, United Kingdom. She was on a voyage from Sundsvall, Sweden to Carmarthen, United Kingdom.
Life Brigade	United Kingdom	The ship was sighted off Cape Henry, Virginia, United States whilst on a voyage from Baltimore, Maryland, United States to Neath, Glamorgan. No further trace, presumed foundered with the loss of all eight crew.
Stornoway, and unnamed vessel	United Kingdom; Norway	The barque Stornoway collided with a Norwegian vessel 40 nautical miles (74 km) off Cape de Gatt, Spain and was severely damaged. She put in to Cartagena, Spain. The Norwegian vessel foundered. Her crew were rescued by Stornoway.
Teviotdale	United Kingdom	The barque was wrecked on the Corton Sands, in the North Sea off the coast of Suffolk, with the loss of all twelve crew. She was on a voyage from the River Tyne to Rio de Janeiro, Brazil.

== 10 February ==
List of shipwrecks: 10 February 1873
Ship	State	Description
Anne Foster	United Kingdom	The ship was abandoned at sea. Her crew were rescued by the steamship Bywell Castle (United Kingdom).
Cezarena P.	Italy	The barque was wrecked on Tristan da Cunha. Her crew survived. They were taken off the island on 22 February by the brig Emma (Germany). Cezarina P. was on a voyage from Buenos Aires, Argentina to Rangoon, Burma.
Enterprise	United Kingdom	The ship ran aground on the Galloper Sand, in the North Sea off the Kent coast. She was on a voyage from Hartlepool, County Durham to Dieppe, Seine-Inférieure, France. She was refloated and assisted in to Ramsgate, Kent in a severely leaky condition.
Grange	United Kingdom	The steamship was wrecked at "Villes Martin", near Saint-Nazaire, Loire-Inférieure, France.
Leda	France	The ship was driven ashore 6 nautical miles (11 km) west of Ouistreham, Calvados.
Lord John Russell	United Kingdom	The ship was driven ashore in Studland Bay.
Polka	United Kingdom	The brig was wrecked near Torcross, Devon. She was on a voyage from South Shields, County Durhm to Lisbon, Portugal.
Prince Alfred	United Kingdom	The ship was driven ashore near Port Isaac, Cornwall. She was later refloated.

== 11 February ==
List of shipwrecks: 11 February 1873
Ship	State	Description
Bard of Avon	United Kingdom	The barque was abandoned in the Atlantic Ocean 300 nautical miles (560 km) east of Bermuda (34°20′N 55°44′W). Her crew were rescued by W. J. Starkey ( Canada). Bard of Avon was on a voyage from Pensacola, Florida, United States to Greenock, Renfrewshire.
George John	Germany	The barque foundered in the Atlantic Ocean. Her crew were rescued by Orielton ( Canada).
Honorine	France	The ship was driven ashore on the coast of Pas-de-Calais. She was on a voyage from Grangemouth, Stirlingshire, United Kingdom to Cette, Hérault. She was refloated and taken in to Boulogne in a leaky condition.
Palm Tree	United Kingdom	The ship departed from New York, United States for London. No further trace, presumed foundered with the loss of all hands.
Unnamed	United Kingdom	The ship collided with the steamship Artois (France) and sank east of Sardinia, Italy. Her crew were rescued by Artois.

== 12 February ==
List of shipwrecks: 12 February 1873
Ship	State	Description
Caroline	United Kingdom	The schooner was run down and sunk off Cape de Gatt, Spain. Her crew were rescued. She was on a voyage from Marseille, Bouches-du-Rhône, France to Havana, Cuba.
Daring	United Kingdom	The barque ran aground on the Cross Sand, in the North Sea off the coast of Norfolk and sank. Her crew were rescued by the brig Sir Henry Havelock (United Kingdom). Daring was on a voyage from Leith, Lothian to London.
Harmine	Germany	The schooner was driven ashore and wrecked on Læsø, Denmark. She was on a voyage from London to Stralsund.
Hudson	United States	The ship was driven ashore. She was on a voyage from New York to London. She was refloated and put back to New York.
R. W. Hodgson	United Kingdom	The steamship struck a sunken rock and foundered off Cape Corobedo, Spain. Her crew were rescued. She was on a voyage from Huelva, Spain to Liverpool, Lancashire.
Telegram	United Kingdom	The ship was abandoned in the English Channel off The Lizard, Cornwall. Her crew were rescued by Constantia (Germany). Telegram was on a voyage from Newport, Monmouthshire to Kingston, Jamaica.
Wave	United Kingdom	The schooner was driven ashore at Crosby, Lancashire. She was on a voyage from Liverpool to Plymouth, Devon. Wave was refloated with assistance from the Birkenhead Lifeboat and taken in to Birkenhead, Cheshire.

== 13 February ==
List of shipwrecks: 13 February 1873
Ship	State	Description
Topeka	United States	The ship departed from Wilmington, Delaware for London, United Kingdom. No further trace, presumed foundered with the loss of all hands.
Unnamed	Flag unknown	The brigantine collided with the barque Ben Nevis (United Kingdom) off the Isle of Wight, United Kingdom and sank with the loss of all hands.

== 14 February ==
List of shipwrecks: 14 February 1873
Ship	State	Description
Ben Nevis	Canada	The ship departed from Halifax, Nova Scotia for Liverpool, Lancashire, United Kingdom. No further trace, presumed foundered with the loss of all hands.
Harold Haarfanger	Flag unknown	The steamship was driven ashore on Bab-el-Mandeb, Aden Protectorate. She was on a voyage from London, United Kingdom to Colombo, Ceylon. She was refloated and taken in to Port Said, Egypt.
Laura	United Kingdom	The schooner foundered 3 nautical miles (5.6 km) off Whitby, Yorkshire. Her crew were rescued by the schooner Venus (United Kingdom). Laura was on a voyage from Middlesbrough, Yorkshire to Ipswich, Suffolk.

== 15 February ==
List of shipwrecks: 15 February 1873
Ship	State	Description
Archer	United Kingdom	The schooner ran aground on the West Rocks, in the North Sea off the coast of Essex. She was refloated and assisted in to Harwich in a leaky condition.
Dorothea	United Kingdom	The ship ran aground on the Corton Sand, in the North Sea off the coast of Suffolk. She was on a voyage from Sunderland, County Durham to Montevideo, Uruguay. She was refloated with the assistance of a tug and a yawl and assisted in to Harwich in a leaky condition.
Joseph and Margaret	United Kingdom	The brig ran aground at Old Hartlepool, County Durham. She was on a voyage from Whitby, Yorkshire to Old Hartlepool. She was refloated.
Quinteros	United Kingdom	The ship was wrecked on the Isla de Lobos, Uruguay.
Unnamed	Italy	The full-rigged ship ran aground in the River Tyne near South Shields, County Durham and was severely damaged.
Unnamed	Canada	The barque collided with a steamship off St. Catherine's Point, Isle of Wight, United Kingdom and sank. Her crew were rescued by the steamship.

== 16 February ==
List of shipwrecks: 16 February 1873
Ship	State	Description
Eliza	Germany	The brigantine was abandoned in the English Channel 20 nautical miles (37 km) off Portland, Dorset, United Kingdom. Her crew were rescued. She was on a voyage from Barrow-in-Furness, Lancashire, United Kingdom to Papenburg.
Norwich	United Kingdom	The steamship sprang a leak and foundered off the Shinnecock Inlet. Her crew were rescued. She was on a voyage from Boston, Massachusetts to New Orleans, Louisiana.

== 17 February ==
List of shipwrecks: 17 February 1873
Ship	State	Description
Coronation	United Kingdom	The ship sank off Aghada, County Cork.
Florence	Canada	The ship was abandoned at sea. Her crew were rescued by Kohinoor (United Kingdom), which put six of her crew aboard and took her in tow. Florence was on a voyage from Bahia, Brazil to a British port. Kohinoor towed her in to a port in Surinam.
Jenny	United Kingdom	The ship collided with the steamship Henri IV (France) at Brest, Finistère, France and was severely damaged. She was on a voyage from Portsmouth, Hampshire to Port-Launay, Finistère.
Jeune Caesar	France	The ship was wrecked at Saint-Cast-le-Guildo, Côtes-du-Nord. Her crew were rescued.
Lion	New Zealand	The 216-ton barque was wrecked on the bar at Whangapoua Harbour whilst outbound for Adelaide, South Australia with a load of timber. Her crew were rescued.
Lizzie Ann	United Kingdom	The ship was driven ashore at Acre, Ottoman Syria. She was refloated in late April.
Maggie	United States	The ship departed from New York for Seville, Spain. No further trace, presumed foundered with the loss of all hands.
Magnet	United Kingdom	The tug foundered. She was on a voyage from Bremen, Germany to Queenstown, County Cork.
St. Antonio	Italy	The brig was abandoned in the Mediterranean Sea off Castellón de la Plana, Spain. All on board were rescued.
St. Louis	France	The steamship collided with the steamship Aix Scheffer (Netherlands) and was beached. St. Louis was on a voyage from Bordeaux, Gironde to Saint-Nazaire, Loire-Inférieure. She was refloated and taken in to Saint-Nazaire, Loire-Inférieure for repairs.

== 18 February ==
List of shipwrecks: 18 February 1873
Ship	State	Description
Iona	United Kingdom	The ship was driven ashore at Castlemoyle. She was on a voyage from Newry, County Antrim to Middlesbrough, Yorkshire. She was refloated and resumed her voyage, but consequently put in to Scrabster, Caithness in a leaky condition.
Kate	United Kingdom	The steamship ran aground at Alexandria, Egypt. She was refloated on 22 February and taken in to Alexandria.
Nestor	United Kingdom	The brigantine collided with the steamship Bulgarian (United Kingdom) and was abandoned in the Atlantic Ocean with the loss of five of her seven crew. Survivors were rescued by Bulgarian. Nestor was on a voyage from Newport, Monmouthshire to Bilbao, Spain.
Tres Marias	Spain	The brig collided with the barque Cilaos (France) and sank in the Atlantic Ocean (38°25′N 9°30′W) with the loss of 92 of the 213 people on board.
Rose	United Kingdom	The brig was driven ashore and wrecked at Gaza, Ottoman Syria. Her crew were rescued.

== 19 February ==
List of shipwrecks: 19 February 1873
Ship	State	Description
Cervantes	Spain	The steamship ran aground at Workington, Cumberland, United Kingdom. She was on a voyage from Bilbao to Workington.
Citizen F	United Kingdom	The steamboat was run down and sunk by another steamboat in the River Thames at Temple. All on bord survived.
Dagmar	Denmark	The steamship ran aground north of "Svineborderne". She was on a voyage from Hull, Yorkshire, United Kingdom to Copenhagen.
Larnax	United Kingdom	The barque was run into by the steamship C. M. Palmer (United Kingdom) and sank in the River Thames at Gravesend, Kent with the loss of three lives. Larnax was on a voyage from London to Mauritius. She was refloated on 4 March.
Samuel Abbott	United Kingdom	The brig was driven ashore at Flamborough Head, Yorkshire.
Vanguard	United Kingdom	The brigantine ran aground on the Longsand, in the North Sea off the coast of Essex, and sank. Her crew were rescued. She was on a voyage from Sunderland, County Durham to Cherbourg, Manche, France.
Victorine	United Kingdom	The ship was wrecked. She was on a voyage from Neath, Glamorgan to Granville, Manche, France.

== 20 February ==
List of shipwrecks: 20 February 1873
Ship	State	Description
Killarney	United Kingdom	The ship was driven ashore at Wainfleet, Lincolnshire. She was on a voyage from Antwerp, Belgium to Goole, Yorkshire.
Marmion	United Kingdom	The steam lighter was run into by the steamship Princess Alice (United Kingdom and sank in the Clyde at Greenock, Renfrewshire.
Otter	United Kingdom	The steamship collided with the steamship J. H. Lorentzen (United Kingdom) and sank in the Wold, off Great Yarmouth, Norfolk. Otter was on a voyage from Newcastle upon Tyne, Northumberland to Antwerp, Belgium.
Surf	United States	The ship was driven ashore at Le Moule, Guadeloupe. She was on a voyage from Newcastle upon Tyne to Le Moule. She was consequently condemned.

== 22 February ==
List of shipwrecks: 22 February 1873
Ship	State	Description
Tennyson	United States	The ship foundered off Mauritius with the loss of all but three of her crew. Survivors were rescued by Warren Hastings (United Kingdom). Tennyson was on a voyage from Calcutta, India to Boston, Massachusetts.

== 23 February ==
List of shipwrecks: 23 February 1873
Ship	State	Description
Anna	United Kingdom	The ship collided with Auguste Blanche (United Kingdom) and was beached at Harwich, Essex.
Royal Oak	United Kingdom	The sloop was wrecked on the coast of Lincolnshire. Her four crew survived. she was on a voyage from Boston, Lincolnshire to Castleford, Yorkshire.

== 24 February ==
List of shipwrecks: 24 February 1873
Ship	State	Description
Concord	United Kingdom	The schooner heeled over and sank at Carrickfergus, County Antrim. She was severely damaged.
Isabella	United Kingdom	The schooner ran aground on the Hinder Bank, in the North Sea off the Dutch coast. She was on a voyage from Gioja, Spain to Rotterdam, South Holland, Netherlands. She was refloated and towed in to Hellevoetsluis, Zeeland, Netherlands where she sank.
Marianna Pescetto	Italy	The barque ran aground off the Barbary Coast and was wrecked. She was on a voyage from Cartagena, Spain to Swansea, Glamorgan, United Kingdom.
Nor-Wester	United States	The ship caught fire and put in to Key West, Florida. She was on a voyage from New Orleans, Louisiana to Liverpool, Lancashire, United Kingdom. She was a total loss.
Paquebot de Dunkerque	France	The ship ran aground on the Nash Sand, in the Bristol Channel off the coast of Glamorgan, capsized and was wrecked with the loss of all but one of her crew. The survivor was rescued by Marquis of Worcester (United Kingdom). Paquebot de Dunkerque was on a voyage from Clonakilty, County Cork, United Kingdom to Cardiff, Glamorgan.
Precieuse	France	The ship ran aground on the Billant Bank, in the Bay of Biscay and sank. Her crew were rescued. She was on a voyage from Cardiff to Nantes, Loire-Inférieure.
Storm King	United States	The ship was damaged by fire at Sydney, Nova Scotia, Canada.
Victoria	United Kingdom	The ship struck a rock at Cove, Ross-shire and was abandoned by her crew. She was on a voyage from Ullapool, Ross-shire to Montrose, Forfarshire. She floated off and sank. Also reported to have struck a rock and sank near Girdle Ness, Aberdeenshire.
Wakefield	United Kingdom	The steamship caught fire at sea. She was on a voyage from Hamburg, Germany to Grimsby, Lincolnshire.
Welkin	United States	The ship departed from Cardiff for Havana, Cuba. No further trace, presumed foundered with the loss of all hands.

== 25 February ==
List of shipwrecks: 25 February 1873
Ship	State	Description
Adelaide	United Kingdom	The oyster smack was driven ashore and sank at Pencwmpoint, Pembrokeshire.
Anne and Alice	United Kingdom	The barque was driven ashore and wrecked at Derbyhaven, Isle of Man.
Belfast	United Kingdom	The ship was driven ashore at Carrickfergus, County Antrim. She was refloated.
Buffalo	United Kingdom	The steamship was driven ashore at Greenisland, County Antrim. She was on a voyage from Glasgow, Renfrewshire to Belfast, County Antrim. She was refloated and completed her voyage.
El Cano	Spain	The steamship was wrecked on the Pearl Rock, off Gibraltar with the loss of a crew member. She was on a voyage from Barcelona to Antwerp, Belgium.
Ferozepore	United Kingdom	The barque was abandoned in the Atlantic Ocean. Her crew were rescued by Express (United Kingdom). Ferozepore was on a voyage from "Bulsiwer" to London.
Mesopotamia	United Kingdom	The ship caught fire and was beached at Bushire, Persia. She was refloated on 2 March.
No	Italy	The barque collided with Gaston (France and sank in the English Channel 20 nautical miles (37 km) off Portland, Dorset, United Kingdom with the loss of one life. No was on a voyage from South Shields, County Durham, United Kingdom to Genoa.
Perseverance	United Kingdom	The brigantine was driven ashore at Clandeboy, County Down. She was on a voyage from Maryport, Cumberland to Belfast. She was refloated and towed in to Belfast.
Petrel	(United Kingdom of Great Britain and Ireland) Isle of Man	The smack was driven ashore and wrecked at Port St. Mary.
Prosperity	United Kingdom	The yawl sank off Abersoch, Caernarfonshire. A man was rescued by the Abersoch Lifeboat.
Reward	United Kingdom	The brig ran aground on the Haaks Bank, in the North Sea off the Dutch coast. Her crew were rescued. She was on a voyage from Sunderland, County Durham to the Nieuwe Diep.
Victoria Maria	France	The ship was wrecked on Deadman Point, Cornwall, United Kingdom. Her crew were rescued. She was on a voyage from Trouville-sur-Mer, Calvados to Gloucester, United Kingdom.
Ythan	United Kingdom	The schooner was driven ashore and wrecked near Barry, Forfarshire. Her crew were rescued. She was on a voyage from Sunderland, County Durham to Arbroath, Forfarshire.
Unnamed	Netherlands	The ship was run into by the steamship Swanland and sank at Rotterdam, South Holland.

== 26 February ==
List of shipwrecks: 26 February 1873
Ship	State	Description
Ann	United Kingdom	The ship was driven ashore and wrecked at "Drunmore". She was on a voyage from Portwilliam, Dumfriesshire to Maryport, Cumberland.
Clanranald	United Kingdom	The brig was wrecked on the Barbary Coast. Her nine crew took to a boat; they were rescued the next day by the brig Express (Russia). Clanranald was on a voyage from Swansea, Glamorgan to Carloforte, Sardinia, Italy.
Dorothy	United Kingdom	The barque was run ashore at Gibraltar in a waterlogged condition. Her thirteen crew survived. She was on a voyage from Grimsby, Lincolnshire to Messina, Sicily, Italy. She subsequently broke her back and was condemned.
Ellen and Maria	United Kingdom	The brig was driven ashore at Blyth, Northumberland. Her crew were rescued.
Magna Charta	United Kingdom	The steamship collided with the steamship Abana or Alabama (United Kingdom) and sank in the North Sea off Souter Point, County Durham with the loss of a crew member.
Minerva	United Kingdom	The brig was driven ashore at Blyth. Her crew survived. She was on a voyage from Boulogne, Pas-de-Calais, France to Amble, Northumberland.
Oneco	United States	The ship caught fire at Tybee Island, Georgia and was scuttled. She was refloated in March and towed to Venus Point, Georgia.
Tyro	United Kingdom	The brigantine was driven ashore on Sanda Island, in the Firth of Clyde. Her crew were rescued. She was on a voyage from Troon, Ayrshire to Dundalk, County Louth.
Ulverstone	United Kingdom	The collier collided with the barque Concordia (Austria-Hungary) and sank off Weymouth, Dorset. Her crew survived. Ulverstone was on a voyage from South Shields, County Durham to Cartagena, Spain.
Witch of the Wave	United Kingdom	The ship was driven ashore near the mouth of the Gillespie Burn, in the Bay of Luce. She was on a voyage from Liverpool, Lancashire to Drummore, Wigtownshire.

== 27 February ==
List of shipwrecks: 27 February 1873
Ship	State	Description
Ann	United Kingdom	The ship was driven ashore at Drummore, Wigtownshire. She was on a voyage from Portwilliam, Wigtownshire to Maryport, Cumberland.
Birmah	United Kingdom	The steamship collided with the steamship City of Cambridge (United Kingdom) and sank in the River Mersey. Her crew were rescued by the tug Iron King (United Kingdom). Birmah was on a voyage from Iloilo, Spanish East Indies to Liverpool, Lancashire. She was refloated on 20 October and beached at Egremont.
Indefatigable, and White Rose	United Kingdom; United Kingdom	The ferry White Rose collided with Indefatigable in the River Mersey. Both vessels were severely damaged.
Kate	United Kingdom	The schooner ran aground in the Firth of Forth and was wrecked. She was on a voyage from Truro, Cornwall to Leith, Lothian.
Laura	United Kingdom	The ship ran aground on the Burcom Sand, in the North Sea. She was on a voyage from Inverness to Weymouth, Dorset. She was refloated and taken in to Grimsby, Lincolnshire in a leaky condition.
Mary Williams	United Kingdom	The ship departed from Lisbon, Portugal for Liverpool. No further trace, presumed foundered with the loss of all hands.
Patrician	United States	The ship was wrecked at San Francisco, California. Her crew were rescued.
Tunstall	United Kingdom	The steamship was driven ashore at Broadness Point.
Ville d'Andraix	France	The brigantine was abandoned in the Atlantic Ocean. Her crew were rescued by Black Prince (United Kingdom). Ville d'Andraix was on a voyage from New York, United States to A Coruña, Spain.

== 28 February ==
List of shipwrecks: 28 February 1873
Ship	State	Description
Barracouta	United Kingdom	The ship ran aground at New York, United States.
Cairngrom	United Kingdom	The ship ran aground at New York. She was refloated.
Dio Adelphie	Greece	The brig sak west of Cape Trafalgar, Spain. Her crew were rescued. She was on a voyage from Grimsby, Lincolnshire, United Kingdom to Galaţi, Ottoman Empire
Ella	United Kingdom	The ship was driven ashore near Portrush, County Antrim. Her crew were rescued. She was on a voyage from Ardrossan, Ayrshire to Londonderry.
Hadleys	United Kingdom	The barque was driven ashore and wrecked at Aracati, Brazil.
Maranhense	Flag unknown	The steamship struck the quayside at Liverpool, Lancashire, United Kingdom and was severely damaged.
Palestine	United Kingdom	The barque ran aground on the Goodwin Sands, Kent. She was refloated.
Pathfinder	United Kingdom	The steamship struck rocks at Dover, Kent and was damaged. She was on a voyage from Calais, France to Dover.
Patrician	United Kingdom	The ship was wrecked at San Francisco, California, United States. Her crew were rescued. She was on a voyage from San Francisco to Liverpool.
Robert Irving	United Kingdom	The ship sank off Douglas, Isle of Man. Her crew were rescued. She was on a voyage from Harrington, Cumberland to Douglas.

== Unknown date ==
List of shipwrecks: Unknown date in February 1873
Ship	State	Description
Aldana	United States	The ship was driven ashore at North Point, Maryland. She was on a voyage from Cárdenas, Cuba to Baltimore, Maryland.
Anne Foster	United Kingdom	The ship was abandoned in the Bay of Biscay. Her crew were rescued.
Azuline	United Kingdom	The ship foundered. She was on a voyage from Pensacola, Florida, United States to Sunderland, County Durham.
Barracouta	United States	The ship ran aground in the Columbia River before 28 February.
Bedlington	United Kingdom	The steamship was wrecked near Les Sables-d'Olonne, Vendée with the loss of all but three of her eleven crew. She was on a voyage from Les Sables-d'Olonne to Whitehaven, Cumberland.
Blue Jacket	United Kingdom	The ship was driven ashore and sank at Flamborough Head, Yorkshire. She was on a voyage from Rouen, Seine-Inférieure, France to South Shields, County Durham.
Brother's Pride	Canada	The schooner was abandoned in the Atlantic Ocean before 24 February.
Ceres	Germany	The ship was driven ashore before 12 February. She was on a voyage from Philadelphia, Pennsylvania, United States to a Baltic port. She was refloated and put back to Phildadelphia.
Charles S. Baylis	United Kingdom	The ship was severely damaged by fire at Mobile, Alabama, United States.
City of Halifax	United Kingdom	The steamship was damaged by fire at Saint John's, Newfoundland Colony before 11 February.
Coronella	United Kingdom	The barque was driven ashore at Ballyferris, County Down. She was on a voyage from Ardrossan, Ayrshire to Havana, Cuba. She was refloated with the assistance of two tugs and towed in to the Belfast Lough.
Côte d'Or	France	The barque foundered off Porto Judeau, Azores. Her crew were rescued.
Edwin M. Reed	United States	The ship was abandoned in the Atlantic Ocean. Her crew were rescued by Addie M. Bird (United States). Edwin M. Reed was on a voyage from Baltimore to Boston, Massachusetts.
Elisabeth Taylor	United Kingdom	The schooner was wrecked off the coast of Wigtownshire.
Ellen Jane	United Kingdom	The ship was driven ashore at the mouth of the River Tees. She was later refloated.
Epoque	France	The ship was wrecked at Cap-Haïtien, Haiti. She was on a voyage from Saint Thomas, Virgin Islands to Haiti.
Essex	United Kingdom	The steamship ran aground at Baltic Port, Russia. She was on a voyage from Hull, Yorkshire to Reval, Russia.
Express	United Kingdom	The ship was driven ashore near Aracati, Brazil. She was on a voyage from Pernambuco to Aracati.
Francois I	France	The ship capsized in a dry dock at Rio de Janeiro, Brazil. She was declared a total loss.
G. W. Hunter	United Kingdom	The ship ran aground on the Old Proprietor and was abandoned by her crew. She was severely damaged. She was on a voyage from Saint John, New Brunswick, Canada to Dublin.
Helen	United Kingdom	The schooner was driven ashore and sank at Southend, Essex. She was on a voyage from Caen, Calvados, France to London.
Hidalgo	United Kingdom	The steamship was driven ashore in the Red Sea before 16 February.
Karnak	Germany	The steamship ran aground in the Straits of Magellan
Kenilworth	United Kingdom	The steamship struck a sunken rock in the Strait of Magellan and was consequently beached at "Grapple Harbour". She was on a voyage from Valparaíso, Chile to Liverpool, Lancashire. Temporary repairs were made and she completed her voyage.
Kfarman	Norway	The ship was abandoned in the Atlantic Ocean before 13 February.
Lady Cartier	United Kingdom	The barque collided with the steamship Ville de Brest (France) and sank before 11 February.
Luce	Flag unknown	The ship was wrecked. She was on a voyage from Trieste to Cette, Hérault, France.
Margarethe	Germany	The brig was wrecked in the Los Roques archipelago, Venezuela. She was on a voyage from Hamburg to Maracaibo, Venezuela.
Marie Theres	United Kingdom	The ship was wrecked. Her crew were rescued. She was on a voyage from Hakodate, Japan to Shanghai.
Martha Jane	United Kingdom	The derelict ship was beached at Kilmore.
Mirfield	United Kingdom	The steamship struck a sunken rock off Ouessant, Finistère, France and was holed. An attempt was made to abandon ship, but a boat was swamped with the loss of three lives. The survivors decided to remain aboard. Mirfield was on a voyage from Alexandria, Egypt to Hull. She put in to Plymouth, Devon in a severely damaged condition.
Mystery	United Kingdom	The sloop ran aground and sank in the River Usk at Chepstow, Monmouthshire.
Naval Reserve	United Kingdom	The ship was driven ashore at the Rammekens Castle, near Vlissingen, Zeeland, Netherlands.
Nor'wester	United States	The clipper caught fire at sea. She was on a voyage from New Orleans, Louisiana to Liverpool. She put in to Key West, Florida on 27 February but was a total loss.
Nouvelle Societe	France	The ship was driven ashore in Blanc Sablon Cove, Ille-et-Vilaine. She was on a voyage from Swansea, Glamorgan, United Kingdom to Marennes, Charente-Inférieure. She was later refloated and towed in to Brest, Finistère.
Ocean Queen	United Kingdom	The ship ran aground and was severely damaged. She was on a voyage from Hong Kong to Amoy, China. She was refloated and completed her voyage.
Olympia	(United Kingdom of Great Britain and Ireland) Turks Islands	The schooner was wrecked off Anegada, Bahamas. Her crew were rescued.
Ormoy	United Kingdom	The ship was wrecked. Her crew were rescued. She was on a voyage from Yokohama, Japan to Amoy.
Padowa	Germany	The ship was abandoned off La Rochelle, Charente-Inférieure, France
Polonaise	United Kingdom	The ship was wrecked on Masthead Island, Queensland before 4 February. She was on a voyage from Rockhampton, Queensland to London.
Primrose	United Kingdom	The ship ran aground on the Middlecross Sand. She was on a voyage from Sunderland to Alexandria. She was refloated.
Progress	United Kingdom	The ship was run down and sunk in the Mediterranean Sea off Sardinia, Italy by the steamship Artois (France).
Reprise	United Kingdom	The ship was driven ashore near Cabo de Santa Maria, Portugal.
Richard Thompson	United Kingdom	The brigantine sank off Coll, Inner Hebrides before 4 February.
Sant Prisco	Flag unknown	The ship was driven ashore at Gibraltar. She was refloated on 28 February.
Secret	United Kingdom	The ship was wrecked on Eleuthera, Bahamas before 14 February. She was on a voyage from Demerara, British Guiana to Halifax, Nova Scotia, Canada.
Sjofrocken	Flag unknown	The ship was wrecked at Nassau, Bahamas before 28 February. She was on a voyage from Minatitlán, Mexico to Falmouth, Cornwall, United Kingdom.
St. Vincent de Paul	France	The ship was wrecked on the English coast between 5 and 20 February. A crew member was rescued by the steamship Lloyds (United Kingdom). St. Vincent de Paul was on a voyage from Hull to San Domingo.
Sunfoo	Flag unknown	The steamship was driven ashore near Jeddah, Hejaz Vilayet. She was on a voyage from Singapore, Straits Settlements to a British port. She was refloated and continued her voyage, but consequently put in to Malta in a leaky condition.
Superb	France	The ship was driven ashore and wrecked near Granville, Manche.
Thorwaldsen	United States	The schooner left Newfoundland for Gloucester, Massachusetts on 18 February and vanished. Lost with all 7 hands.
Tstriana	Flag unknown	The ship was driven ashore at "Fedona Point". She was on a voyage from Trieste to Bordeaux, Gironde, France.
Warberg	Sweden	The barque was wrecked. Her crew were rescued. She was on a voyage from South Shields to a port on Gotland.
Widdrington	United Kingdom	The ship foundered off the coast of Denmark.
William	United States	The ship was driven ashore and wrecked at Cape Hatteras, North Carolina. She was on a voyage from Dominica to Baltimore.
Young Marquis	United Kingdom	The ship was abandoned in the Atlantic Ocean off Ouessant, Finistère, France. Her crew were rescued.
