= Tiago Treichel =

Brazilian footballer

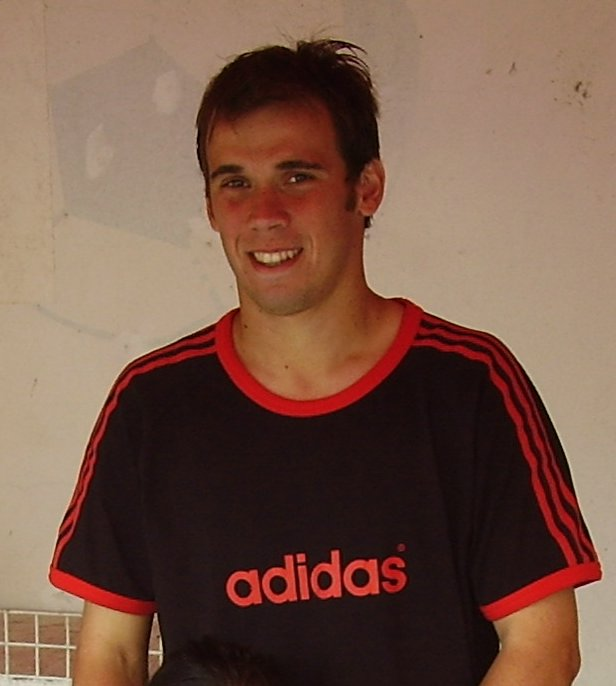

Personal information
- Full name: Tiago Treichel Moraes da Silva
- Date of birth: 8 September 1984 (age 42)
- Place of birth: Pelotas, Brazil
- Height: 1.78 m (5 ft 10 in)
- Position: Attacking midfielder

Youth career
- Pelotas

Senior career*
Years	Team	Apps	(Gls)
2003–2004	Pelotas	0	(0)
2005	Sapiranga	0	(0)
2005	Novo Hamburgo	1	(0)
2006	Litex Lovech	?	(?)
2006–2009	Palmeiras	0	(0)
2007	→ Ceará (loan)	0	(0)
2007	→ Aimoré (loan)	0	(0)
2008	→ Atlético de Ibirama (loan)	0	(0)
2008	→ Operário (MS) (loan)	2	(0)
2009	→ São Paulo (RS) (loan)	0	(0)
2009	Comercial de Ribeirão Preto	0	(0)
2010	Guarani de Juazeiro	0	(0)
2010	Votoraty	0	(0)
2010	Cerâmica	0	(0)
2012	Pelotas	0	(0)
2012	Farroupilha	0	(0)
- * Club domestic league appearances and goals

Tiago Treichel Moraes da Silva known as Tiago Treichel or just Tiago (born 8 September 1984) is a Brazilian footballer

== Biography ==
=== Early career ===
Born in Pelotas, Rio Grande do Sul state, Tiago Treichel had played for Pelotas, Sapiranga, Novo Hamburgo (from 1 August 2005 to January 2006) in state leagues before signed by Bulgarian side Litex Lovech on 31 January 2006. With Sapiranga in the first half of 2005 Campeonato Gaúcho Second Division, the team advanced to the second stage (round of 16), finished as the 5th of Group 5 (second stage divided into 3 groups, 5 to 7, 6 teams each). Tiago scored 8 goals in 2005 Copa FGF, which Novo Hamburgo was the champion. Novo Hamburgo also played in 2005 Campeonato Brasileiro Série C, which the team finished as the 4th. He only played once, on 28 August 2005, which another Tiago, Tiago Rannow played more.

With the Bulgarian side, Tiago did not enter Litex's squad in 2005–06 UEFA Cup.

=== Palmeiras ===
On 21 August 2006, he returned to Brazil, signed a three-year contract with Palmeiras.

He then spent seasons on loan to Brazilian lower divisions, for Ceará (March to May 2007), Aimoré (August to December 2007), Atlético de Ibirama (March to June 2008), Operário (MS) (June to August 2008), São Paulo (RS) (April to July 2009) All the clubs were mainly played in state competitions, namely: 2007 Campeonato Cearense, 2007 Campeonato Gaúcho Segunda Divisão, 2007 Copa FGF, 2008 Campeonato Cearense and 2009 Campeonato Gaúcho Segunda Divisão. Only Operário was played in 2008 Campeonato Brasileiro Série C and Ceará played in 2007 Copa do Brasil. He only played 2 out of possible 6 games in Série C, on 6 July and on 20 July. Operário did not advance to the next stage.

=== Late career ===
In August 2009 he was signed by Comercial de Ribeirão Preto until the end of 2009 Campeonato Paulista Segunda Divisão (4th level in São Paulo state).

He then left for Guarani of Juazeiro do Norte, Ceará state in 1-year deal in November 2009. In February 2010 he was signed by Paulista Série A2 side Votoraty until the end of year. but in March he left for Cerâmica of 2010 Campeonato Gaúcho Segunda Divisão, also signed a contract until the end of 2010. He was released again in August 2010, before the start of 2010 Copa FGF.

That season he played 3 times in Paulista Série A2 and 8 times in Gaúcho 2nd Divisão, all goalless.

In December 2011 Tiago was signed by Pelotas but in February 2012 joined Grêmio Atlético Farroupilha until the end of 2012 Campeonato Gaúcho.

== Honours ==
- Copa FGF: 2005
