= Leo Clasen =

Gay Holocaust survivor (1906–1972)

Leo Clasen (1906–1972) was imprisoned in the Sachsenhausen concentration camp because of his homosexuality. He wrote about his experiences in 1954–1955 in the homophile magazine Humanitas, Monatszeitschrift für Menschlichkeit und Kultur, which was published in seven parts under the pseudonym L. D. Classen von Neudegg. His account is one of the most significant records of the experience of homosexuals persecuted by Nazi Germany. He was born on 26 June 1906 in Neumünster, Schleswig-Holstein, Germany and was educated as a doctor.

== See also ==
- Persecution of homosexuals in Nazi Germany and the Holocaust
