= Becton =

Becton is a surname. Notable people with the surname include:

- Charles Becton, attorney, former judge and president of the North Carolina Bar Association
- Frank Becton (1873–1909), English professional footballer
- Frederick J. Becton (1908–1995), United States Navy rear admiral
- George Wilson Becton (died 1933), African-American preacher
- Julius W. Becton Jr. (1926–2023), United States Army lieutenant general
- Maxwell Becton (1868–1951), co-founded Becton Dickinson, an American medical equipment manufacturing company, in 1897
- Mekhi Becton (born 1999), American football player
- Nick Becton (born 1990), American National Football League player
- Tommy Becton (1878–1957), former professional footballer
