= Capitão Telhada =

Brazilian politician (born 1986)

Member of the Legislative Assembly of São Paulo
- Incumbent
- Assumed office 15 March 2023

Personal details
- Born: 3 September 1986 (age 39)
- Party: Progressistas
- Parent: Coronel Telhada (father)

Rafael Henrique Cano Telhada (born 3 September 1986), better known as Capitão Telhada, is a Brazilian politician serving as a member of the Legislative Assembly of São Paulo since 2023. He is the son of Coronel Telhada.
