= Tiago Rannow =

Brazilian footballer (born 1982)

Personal information
- Full name: Tiago da Silva Rannow
- Date of birth: 3 September 1982 (age 44)
- Place of birth: Porto Alegre, Brazil
- Height: 1.78 m (5 ft 10 in)
- Position: Right-back

Team information
- Current team: Santa Cruz

Senior career*
Years	Team	Apps	(Gls)
- ?
2005	Novo Hamburgo	7	(0)
2006	Ipatinga	0	(0)
2006	Joinville	0	(0)
2007	Cerâmica	0	(0)
2008	Chapecoense	0	(0)
2008–2009	Naval	6	(0)
2010	Noroeste	0	(0)
2011	São José de Porto Alegre	0	(0)
2011	Brasil de Farroupilha	0	(0)
2011	Brusque	4	(0)
2012	Santa Cruz	0	(0)
2012–2013	Brasil de Pelotas	6	(0)
2014	Santa Cruz	0	(0)
- * Club domestic league appearances and goals

Tiago da Silva Rannow known as Tiago or Tiago Rannow (born 3 September 1982) is a Brazilian footballer for Santa Cruz.

== Biography ==
Tiago started his career at Rio Grande do Sul state. In 2005 season he scored once in Campeonato Gaúcho and played in 2005 Campeonato Brasileiro Série C, which the team finished 4th.

In February 2006 he signed a 2-year contract with Ipatinga. After failed to play any game in 2006 Campeonato Brasileiro Série C, he left for Joinville in October 2006, for a playoff to decide which team to represent Santa Catarina in 2007 Série C, eventually Joinville winning the playoff and the other teams would have to qualify via winning 2007 Campeonato Catarinense. On 1 August 2007, he left for Cerâmica for 2007 Copa FGF. He played for Chapecoense in 2008 Campeonato Catarinense.

Tiago left for Portuguese Primeira Liga side Naval, in mid-2008. He played the first 2 games and first 4 games of 2008–09 and 2009–10 Primeira Liga respectively.

In February 2010 he returned to Brazil, after terminating his contract with Naval. He signed a contract with Noroeste until the end of 2010 Campeonato Paulista Série A2. In November 2010 he left for São José de Porto Alegre for the next season Campeonato Gaúcho. but on 4 January 2011 he was signed by Brasil de Farroupilha in 6-month contract. In July he was signed by Brusque until the end of 2011 Série D.

In December 2011 he was signed by Brasil de Pelotas in 2-year contract. In January 2012 he left for Santa Cruz do Sul in 6-month loan. after the end of 2012 Campeonato Gaúcho Tiago returned to Pelotas for 2012 Série D.

== Honours ==
- Copa FGF: 2005
