= SS Bywell Castle =

Passenger and cargo ship

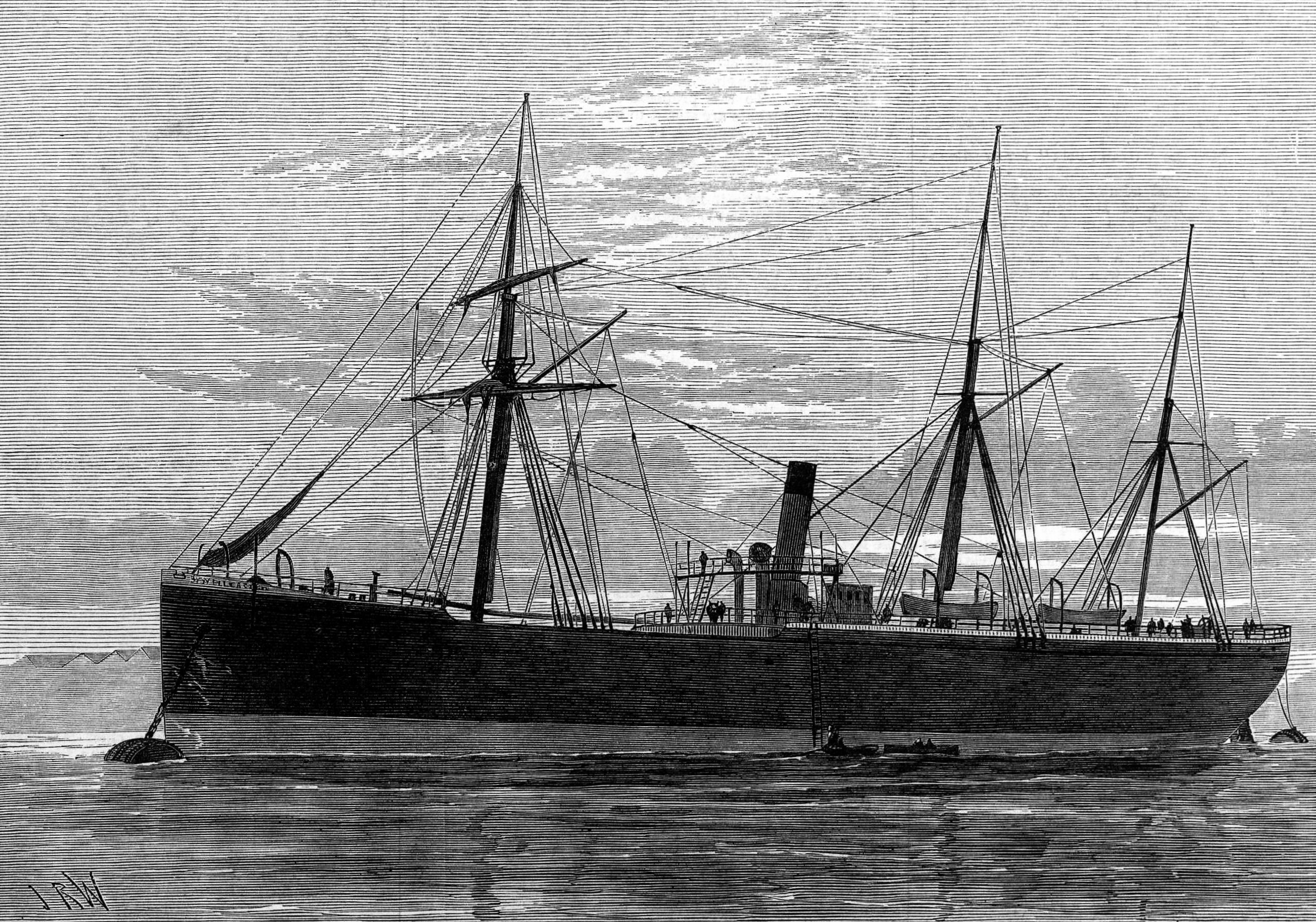
- Bywell Castle, 1878

History
- Name: Bywell Castle
- Namesake: Bywell Castle
- Owner: Hall Brothers
- Port of registry: (United Kingdom of Great Britain and Ireland) London, United Kingdom
- Builder: Palmers Shipbuilding and Iron Company
- Yard number: 250
- Launched: 20 November 1869
- Completed: January 1870
- Maiden voyage: 9 February 1870
- Out of service: February 1883
- Identification: Code Letters JKPW; United Kingdom Official Number 63546
- Fate: Foundered or wrecked

General characteristics
- Class & type: Cargo liner
- Tonnage: 1,376 GRT, 892 NRT
- Length: 254 feet 3 inches (77.50 m)
- Beam: 32 feet 1 inch (9.78 m)
- Depth: 19 feet 6 inches (5.94 m)
- Installed power: Compound steam engine, 120hp
- Propulsion: Single screw propeller, sails
- Sail plan: Barquentine
- Crew: 22

Bywell Castle was a passenger and cargo ship that was built in 1869 by Palmers Shipbuilding and Iron Company, Jarrow, County Durham. She was involved in the Princess Alice Disaster in September 1878 in which more than 600 people died. She disappeared in February 1883 whilst on a voyage from Alexandria, Egypt to Hull, Yorkshire, United Kingdom.

== Description ==
Bywell Castle was 254 feet 3 inches (77.50 m) long, with a beam of 32 feet 1 inch (9.78 m) and a depth of 19 feet 6 inches (5.94 m). She was assessed at 1,376 GRT, 892 NRT. She was powered by a compound steam engine, which had cylinders of 27 inches (69 cm) and 54 inches (140 cm) diameter by 33 inches (84 cm) stroke. It was rated at 120 horsepower and drove a single screw propeller.

== History ==
Bywell Castle was built as yard number 250 by Palmers Shipbuilding and Iron Company, Jarrow, County Durham for Hall Brothers, Newcastle upon Tyne, Northumberland. She was launched on 20 November 1869 and completed in January 1870. Her port of registry was London and the United Kingdom Official Number 63546 was allocated, as were the Code Letters JKPW. She had a crew of 22 men.

Bywell Castle made her maiden voyage from London to Bombay and Kurrachee, India on 9 February 1870. From 10 to 12 February she encountered severe gales in the English Channel and the Bay of Biscay. She arrived at Bombay on 16 March, having been delayed by a day when the steamship Brazilian ran aground in the Suez Canal. Although she made a good passage, it was reported that her accommodation was more adapted to cargo than passengers. On her return voyage she reached Malta from Bombay via the Suez Canal in 28 days. She was bound for Liverpool, Lancashire with a cargo of cotton. On 24 January 1873, Bywell Castle put in to Plymouth, Devon due to a loss of steering gear, two lifeboats and other damage whilst on a voyage from Newcastle upon Tyne to Aden, Aden Settlement. On 2 February, she rescued seventeen crew from the British full-rigged ship Satellite, which foundered in the Atlantic Ocean 120 nautical miles (220 km) south west of the Isles of Scilly. On 8 February, she rescued the crew of the brigantine Young Marquis in the Bay of Biscay. Two days later she rescued the crew of the ship Anne Foster. They were landed at Gibraltar. On 30 November 1873, Bywell Castle was prevented from sailing from Port Talbot, Glamorgan to Port Said, Egypt as she was overloaded by 180 tons. On 25 July 1876, the barque Dorothy collided with the barque Robina in the English Channel 20 nautical miles (37 km) off Start Point, Devon. Dorothy was severely damaged; she was towed in to Plymouth by Bywell Castle. She was reboilered in 1877.

On 3 September 1878, Bywell Castle collided with the paddle steamer Princess Alice in the River Thames at Becton, Middlesex. Princess Alice capsized and sank with the loss of more than 600 lives. Both vessels were held to blame for the collision. Hall Brothers appealed the verdict, and Bywell Castle was held blameless for the collision.

On 24 May 1881, Bywell Castle discovered the passenger ship California in distress in the Atlantic Ocean, her engines having broken down. She towed California the 876 nautical miles (1,622 km) to Halifax, Nova Scotia, Canada, where they arrived on 29 May. Bywell Castle was awarded £3,000 salvage. In February 1883, Bywell Castle was reported missing whilst on a voyage from Alexandria, Egypt to Hull, Yorkshire with a cargo of beans and cotton seed. She was last sighted on 29 January off Cape Corvoeiro, Portugal. It was feared that she may have foundered in the Bay of Biscay on 2 February, although a steamship answering her description was wrecked on the Haisborough Sands, in the North Sea off the coast of Norfolk with the loss of all hands later that month. The Court of Inquiry into her loss ruled that she was overladen.
