= Helmut Clasen =

Canadian motorcycle racer

Helmut Clasen (born September 3, 1935, in Cologne) is a Canadian motorcycle racer. He is an active motorcycle enduro competitor since 1957, called "Speedy" by family and friends alike.

== Career highlights ==
Clasen finished his first International Six Day Trials in 1962 which was held in Garmisch-Partenkirchen, Germany. Clasen, a privateer, campaigned a DKW RT175, and finished only 25 seconds behind Czechoslovak ace Zdeněk Polanka. This finish brought Clasen much recognition as an up-and-coming rider, and earned him a position as a Hercules factory rider. After several successful racing seasons in Germany, Clasen emigrated to Canada in 1967. In Canada, he remained active in the sport of Enduro, also racing in motocross and hare scrambles, while becoming a successful motorcycle Importer and dealer. During the 1971 ISDT, Clasen won the first ever Gold Medal for Canada. This feat earned him an invitation from the Canadian Prime Minister, by whom he was recognized for his Gold Medal effort.

Clasen has participated in 7 ISDT's (1962, 1971, 1972, 1973, 1976, 1989, and 1994), and has won the Canadian Off Road National Championship 14 times. Clasen won his final Canadian National Championship in 2000, at the age of 65. Today, at over 80 years of age, Clasen is actively involved with "Vintage" motorcycle off-road racing. Clasen participates in racing events in Europe, Canada and the United States. January 1972 Ambassador of Canadian Motorcycle Sport. On October 27, 2007, Clasen was inducted into the Canadian Motorcycle Hall of Fame. Clasens' induction is significant as he is the first German Canadian "offroad" racer to be so recognized.
