= Mauro Ovelha =

Brazilian footballer

Personal information
- Full name: Mauro Grasel
- Date of birth: 3 August 1967 (age 59)
- Place of birth: Santo Ângelo, Brazil
- Position: Centre-back

Youth career
- Internacional

Senior career*
Years	Team	Apps	(Gls)
1986	Criciúma		
1987–1988	Blumenau		
1989	Araranguá		
1990–1994	Concórdia EC		
1995	Juventus-SC		
1996	Tubarão		
1997	Brasil de Farroupilha		
1997	Figueirense		
1998	Brasil de Farroupilha		
1998	Marcílio Dias		
1999–2000	Joaçaba		
2001	Atlético de Ibirama		

Managerial career
- 2000: Joaçaba (caretaker)
- 2001: Atlético de Ibirama
- 2007: Marcílio Dias
- 2009–2010: Chapecoense
- 2010: Atlético de Ibirama
- 2011: Chapecoense
- 2011: Joinville
- 2011: Metropolitano
- 2012: Avaí
- 2012: Caxias
- 2013: Atlético de Ibirama
- 2013: CRAC
- 2014: São Luiz
- 2014: Atlético de Ibirama
- 2015: CRAC
- 2015–2016: Brusque
- 2016: Marcílio Dias
- 2017: Brusque
- 2017: Metropolitano
- 2017–2018: Concórdia
- 2018: Camboriú
- 2019: Camboriú
- 2020: Camboriú
- 2022: Camboriú (director)
- 2022–: Metropolitano (director)
- * Club domestic league appearances and goals as of 22 May 2024

Mauro Grasel (born 3 August 1967) better known as Mauro Ovelha, is a Brazilian former professional footballer and manager, who played as a centre-back.

== Playing career ==
Mauro began his career at Criciúma in 1986, and earned the nickname "Ovelha" (English: Sheep) from a radio host in the city, due to the similarity of his hair to that of the singer Ovelha. In 1997 he became involved in controversy when he attacked a fan after being criticized.

== Managerial career ==
Ovelha began his coaching career improvised at Joaçaba in 2000. In 2001, at Atlético de Ibirama, becoming a coach and player at the same time, even replacing himself during a match. His first big job was at Marcílio Dias in 2007, champion of the Copa Santa Catarina and the Recopa Sul-Brasileira. In 2011 he was state champion for the first time with Chapecoense, after being runners-up for four times. Subsequently, Ovelha was champion of the second state division in 2015 with Brusque and 2017 with Concórdia.

In 2022 he took on the role of football supervisor at Camboriú, a team he coached for three seasons. After the 2022 Campeonato Catarinense where Camboriú was runner-up, he went to perform this same function at Metropolitano, where he is currently director.

== Honours ==
=== Player ===
Blumenau

- Campeonato Catarinense Série B: 1987

Concórdia EC

- Campeonato Catarinense Série B: 1991

Atlético de Ibirama

- Campeonato Catarinense Série B: 2001

=== Manager ===
Atlético de Ibirama

- Campeonato Catarinense Série B: 2001

Marcílio Dias

- Copa Santa Catarina: 2007
- Recopa Sul-Brasileira: 2007

Chapecoense

- Campeonato Catarinense: 2011

Caxias

- Copa Pantanal: 2012

Brusque

- Campeonato Catarinense Série B: 2015

Concórdia

- Campeonato Catarinense Série B: 2017
