= Itamar Schülle =

Brazilian footballer and manager (born 1967)

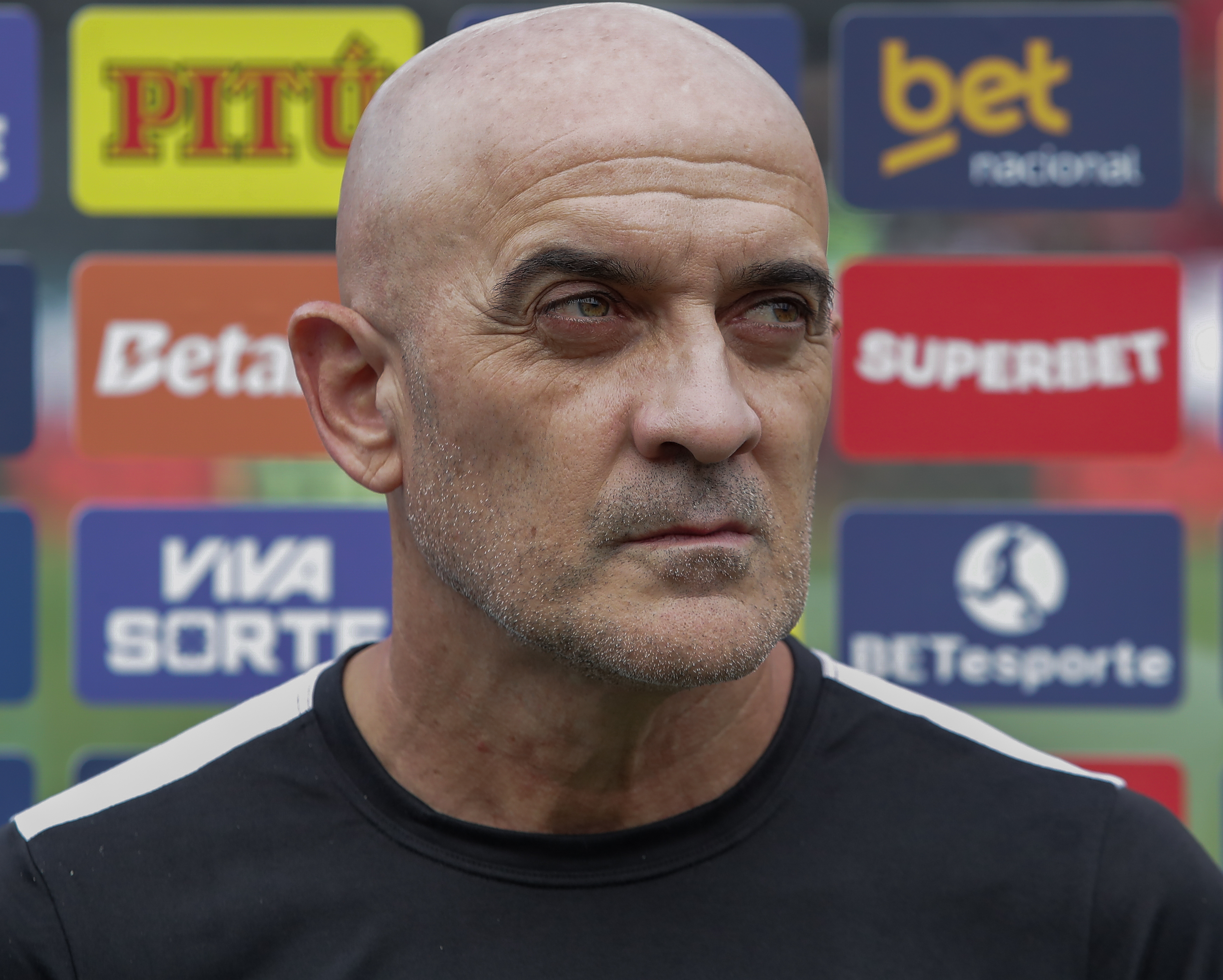
- Schülle in 2025

Personal information
- Full name: Itamar Schülle
- Date of birth: 8 April 1967 (age 59)
- Place of birth: Ituporanga, Brazil
- Position: Forward

Team information
- Current team: ASA (head coach)

Senior career*
Years	Team	Apps	(Gls)
- Brusque

Managerial career
- 2002: Alto Vale
- 2003: São Bento-SC
- 2003–2004: Nacional-PR
- 2004: Juventus-SC
- 2004–2005: Metropolitano
- 2005: Figueirense
- 2005: Juventus-SC
- 2005–2006: São Carlos
- 2006–2007: Juventus-SC
- 2007: Joinville
- 2007: Rio Branco-PR
- 2007: São Luiz-RS
- 2008: Brasil de Pelotas
- 2009–2010: Criciúma
- 2010: Botafogo-PB
- 2010: Pelotas
- 2011: São José-RS
- 2011: Brusque
- 2012: Novo Hamburgo
- 2012: Chapecoense
- 2012: Santo André
- 2013–2014: Novo Hamburgo
- 2014: Caxias
- 2015: Operário Ferroviário
- 2016–2017: Botafogo-PB
- 2017: ABC
- 2018–2019: Cuiabá
- 2019: Vila Nova
- 2020: Santa Cruz
- 2020: Criciúma
- 2021: Paysandu
- 2022: Concórdia
- 2022: Botafogo-PB
- 2023: Concórdia
- 2024: Santa Cruz
- 2024: Retrô
- 2025: Santa Cruz
- 2025: Azuriz
- 2025: Retrô
- 2026: CSA
- 2026–: ASA
- * Club domestic league appearances and goals

Itamar Schülle (born 8 April 1967) is a Brazilian football manager and former player who played as a forward. He is the current head coach of ASA.

Since 2002 Schülle has coached Alto Vale, Nacional de Rolândia, Juventus-SC, Metropolitano, Figueirense, São Carlos, Joinville, Rio Branco de Paranaguá, São Luiz de Ijuí, Brasil de Pelotas, Criciúma, Botafogo da Paraíba, Pelotas, São José-RS, Brusque, Novo Hamburgo, Chapecoense, Santo André, Novo Hamburgo and Caxias.

However, Schülle's greatest achievement was with Operário Ferroviário where he won the Campeonato Paranaense in 2015, where Operário beat Coritiba over two games in the final, with an aggregate margin of 5 to 0.

== Managerial statistics ==
As of 7 May 2026

Managerial record by team and tenure
Team	Nat	From	To	Record							
Team	Nat	From	To	G	W	D	L	GF	GA	GD	Win %
Alto Vale	(Brazil)	1 January 2002	16 April 2002	10	3	1	6	10	18	−8	30.00
São Bento	(Brazil)	1 January 2003	30 October 2003	31	16	7	8	75	41	+34	51.61
Nacional-PR	(Brazil)	30 November 2003	5 April 2004	13	4	4	5	16	17	−1	30.77
Juventus-SC	(Brazil)	6 April 2004	6 December 2004	38	21	10	7	65	38	+27	55.26
Metropolitano	(Brazil)	8 December 2004	8 February 2005	4	0	3	1	2	4	−2	0.00
Figueirense	(Brazil)	10 February 2005	31 May 2005	24	9	6	9	39	26	+13	37.50
São Carlos	(Brazil)	1 June 2005	30 May 2006	23	10	4	9	44	39	+5	43.48
Rio Branco-RP	(Brazil)	19 February 2007	2 March 2007	3	1	1	1	4	4	+0	33.33
Juventus-SC	(Brazil)	5 March 2007	23 April 2007	11	1	1	9	13	25	−12	9.09
Brasil de Pelotas	(Brazil)	1 January 2008	26 November 2008	46	19	8	19	65	70	−5	41.30
Criciúma	(Brazil)	1 January 2009	4 August 2009	36	11	6	19	64	69	−5	30.56
Botafogo-PB	(Brazil)	5 March 2010	20 August 2010	27	9	9	9	35	25	+10	33.33
São José	(Brazil)	22 August 2010	24 October 2010	12	3	5	4	8	11	−3	25.00
Pelotas	(Brazil)	26 October 2010	10 May 2011	17	5	5	7	26	28	−2	29.41
São José	(Brazil)	20 May 2011	16 October 2011	14	2	4	8	15	24	−9	14.29
Brusque	(Brazil)	1 November 2011	3 February 2012	4	1	0	3	1	5	−4	25.00
Novo Hamburgo	(Brazil)	7 February 2012	8 April 2012	14	7	5	2	19	15	+4	50.00
Chapecoense	(Brazil)	9 April 2012	26 November 2012	27	10	8	9	34	23	+11	37.04
Santo André	(Brazil)	1 January 2013	12 September 2013	45	14	11	20	49	54	−5	31.11
Novo Hamburgo	(Brazil)	16 January 2014	31 July 2014	22	10	3	9	24	23	+1	45.45
Caxias	(Brazil)	1 August 2014	6 October 2014	10	1	4	5	6	15	−9	10.00
Operário Ferroviário	(Brazil)	1 January 2015	22 October 2015	29	16	5	8	41	24	+17	55.17
Botafogo-PB	(Brazil)	2 November 2015	1 August 2017	88	42	22	24	115	77	+38	47.73
ABC	(Brazil)	1 September 2017	18 August 2017	15	5	2	8	13	17	−4	33.33
Cuiabá	(Brazil)	29 November 2017	13 October 2019	111	61	25	25	174	98	+76	54.95
Vila Nova	(Brazil)	18 October 2019	1 December 2019	9	1	6	2	7	10	−3	11.11
Santa Cruz	(Brazil)	3 December 2019	8 September 2020	28	15	9	4	33	16	+17	53.57
Criciúma	(Brazil)	1 October 2020	15 December 2020	11	1	4	6	9	18	−9	9.09
Paysandu	(Brazil)	4 February 2021	17 May 2021	16	8	4	4	19	15	+4	50.00
Concórdia	(Brazil)	20 January 2022	21 June 2022	15	6	4	5	15	12	+3	40.00
Botafogo-PB	(Brazil)	22 June 2022	15 September 2022	8	1	6	1	5	5	+0	12.50
Concórdia	(Brazil)	1 January 2023	10 August 2023	27	8	12	7	24	20	+4	29.63
Santa Cruz	(Brazil)	20 November 2023	19 March 2024	13	7	4	2	20	10	+10	53.85
Retrô	(Brazil)	20 March 2024	21 October 2024	24	12	4	8	30	20	+10	50.00
Santa Cruz	(Brazil)	23 October 2024	31 March 2025	12	6	2	4	15	9	+6	50.00
Azuriz	(Brazil)	30 May 2025	22 June 2025	6	1	2	3	3	9	−6	16.67
Retrô	(Brazil)	24 June 2025	18 August 2025	10	1	3	6	4	15	−11	10.00
CSA	(Brazil)	1 January 2026	1 March 2026	12	6	2	4	14	9	+5	50.00
ASA	(Brazil)	2 March 2026	present	17	7	6	4	25	14	+11	41.18
Career total				863	359	219	285	1,154	944	+210	41.60

== Honours ==
=== Player ===
Brusque

- Campeonato Catarinense: 1992
- Copa Santa Catarina: 1992

=== Manager ===
Operário Ferroviário

- Campeonato Paranaense: 2015

Botafogo da Paraiba

- Campeonato Paraibano: 2017

Cuiabá

- Campeonato Mato-Grossense: 2018, 2019

Retrô

- Campeonato Brasileiro Série D: 2024
