= Palmito (footballer) =

Brazilian footballer

Personal information
- Full name: Edemar Luiz Aléssio
- Date of birth: 10 September 1960 (age 66)
- Place of birth: Itajaí, Brazil
- Position: Midfielder

Senior career*
Years	Team	Apps	(Gls)
1980	Juventus (Rio do Sul)		
1981–1986	Joinville		
1986–1987	Chapecoense		
1988	Marcílio Dias		
1989	Criciúma		
1990	Chapecoense		
1991	Blumenau		
1992–1993	Brusque		
- * Club domestic league appearances and goals as of 27 October 2023

Edemar Luiz Aléssio (born 10 September 1960), better known as Palmito, is a Brazilian former professional footballer who played as a midfielder.

== Career ==
A high-quality midfield player, he made history for several football teams in Santa Catarina. He is the record holder for Campeonato Catarinense titles with 7 in total. He currently lives and works in the city of Brusque.

== Honours ==
Joinville

- Campeonato Catarinense: 1981, 1982, 1983, 1984, 1985

Criciúma

- Campeonato Catarinense: 1989

Brusque

- Campeonato Catarinense: 1992
