= Hemerson Maria =

Brazilian footballer (born 1972)

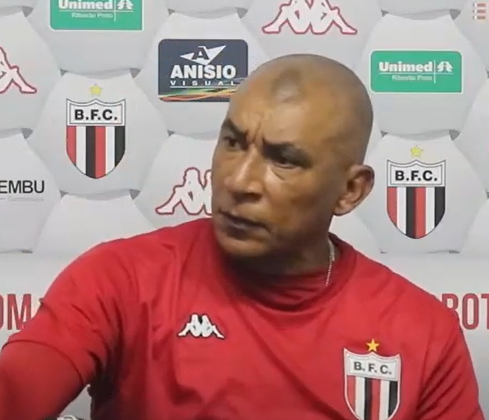
- Maria with Botafogo-SP in 2019

Personal information
- Full name: Hemerson José Maria
- Date of birth: 4 May 1972 (age 54)
- Place of birth: Florianópolis, Brazil
- Position: Forward

Youth career
- 1979–1992: Figueirense

Senior career*
Years	Team	Apps	(Gls)
1993–1994	Figueirense		
1995	Flamengo-SC		
1995	Alto Vale		

Managerial career
- 2001: Guarani de Palhoça U20
- 2001: Guarani de Palhoça
- 2001–2010: Figueirense U20
- 2011–2012: Avaí U20
- 2012: Avaí
- 2013: Red Bull Brasil
- 2013: CRAC
- 2013: Avaí
- 2014–2015: Joinville
- 2016: Joinville
- 2016–2017: Fortaleza
- 2017–2018: Vila Nova
- 2019: Figueirense
- 2019: Botafogo-SP
- 2020: Chapecoense
- 2020: Brasil de Pelotas
- 2021: Criciúma
- 2021: Vila Nova
- 2022: Tombense
- 2023: Barra-SC
- 2023: Aparecidense
- 2024: Anápolis
- 2025: Joinville
- 2026: ABECAT
- * Club domestic league appearances and goals

Hemerson José Maria (born 4 May 1972) is a Brazilian professional football coach and former player who played as a forward.

== Career ==
Maria played as a senior for a period of just three years, representing Figueirense, Flamengo-SC and Alto Vale. After retiring, he moved to a managerial role, being an under-20 coach at Guarani de Palhoça in 2001 before taking over the first team later in the year.

Maria later returned to Figueirense, where he spent nearly ten years managing the under-20 side. He moved to Avaí in 2011, being initially named manager of the under-20 team.

On 26 March 2012, Maria was appointed manager of Avaí, replacing the sacked Mauro Ovelha. He won the 2012 Campeonato Catarinense, but was sacked on 18 September after a poor run of form.

Maria managed Red Bull Brasil and CRAC before returning to Avaí on 13 June 2013. He left the club at the end of the season, after failing to achieve promotion.

On 9 December 2013, Maria was announced as manager of Joinville. He won the 2014 Série B with the club, leading the side to a top tier promotion after 32 years of absence. He was sacked on 4 June, after a poor start in the league.

Maria returned to JEC on 15 February 2016, but was again dismissed on 28 June. On 19 September, he took over Fortaleza in the place of Marquinhos Santos, but left the club on 12 October after missing out on promotion in the Série C.

On 9 May 2017, Maria was named at the helm of Vila Nova. He left the club in the end of the 2018 campaign, after missing out on promotion in both seasons, and was announced back at Figueirense on 28 November 2018.

On 29 July 2019, Maria resigned from Figueira, and was named in charge of Botafogo-SP also in the second division on 7 August. He left in November, with the club finishing the campaign in the 9th position.

Maria was appointed manager of Chapecoense on 5 December 2019, but left on a mutual agreement on 16 February 2020, after just three matches. He took over Brasil de Pelotas on 30 March, but resigned on 28 October.

Maria was named manager of Criciúma on 8 January 2021, but was sacked on 1 April. He returned to Vila Nova on 11 August, but resigned just twelve days later.

On 22 February 2022, Maria replaced Rafael Guanaes at the helm of Tombense. He was himself dismissed on 12 May, after the club's elimination in the 2022 Copa do Brasil.

== Honours ==
=== Player ===
Figueirense

- Campeonato Catarinense: 1994

=== Manager ===
Avaí

- Campeonato Catarinense: 2012

Joinville

- Campeonato Brasileiro Série B: 2014
