= Samuel (footballer, born 1986) =

Brazilian footballer (born 1986)

Personal information
- Full name: Samuel Firmino de Jesus
- Date of birth: 7 April 1986 (age 40)
- Place of birth: São Paulo, Brazil
- Height: 1.90 m (6 ft 3 in)
- Position: Centre-back

Team information
- Current team: Taubaté

Youth career
- Ituano

Senior career*
Years	Team	Apps	(Gls)
2005–2007	Ituano	27	(1)
2007–2008	Portuguesa	16	(0)
2008	Comercial (SP)	8	(0)
2008	União São João	0	(0)
2008–2009	Paraná	11	(0)
2009–2010	Joinville	9	(0)
2010–2011	São Paulo	13	(0)
2011	Werder Bremen	0	(0)
2011–2012	Anderlecht	4	(0)
2012–2013	Braga	0	(0)
2013	São Bernardo	0	(0)
2013–2014	ASA	14	(0)
2014	ABC	26	(2)
2014–2015	Red Bull Brasil	12	
2015–2016	Atlético-GO	30	(0)
2016	Busan IPark	3	(0)
2017	Linense	0	(0)
2017	Bragantino	2	(0)
2017	Juventude	0	(0)
2018	ABC	5	(0)
2019–	Taubaté	0	(0)
- * Club domestic league appearances and goals as of 15 April 2019

Samuel Firmino de Jesus (born 7 April 1986), known as Samuel (Portuguese pronunciation: [sɐmuˈew]) is a Brazilian professional footballer who plays as a centre-back for Taubaté.

== Biography ==
Samuel started his career with Ituano, which he was registered as an amateur in 2005 season. He made his Série B debut on 23 April 2005 and scored a goal on 23 August. He also played the last round of the season as last minute substitute, on 10 September, which the team did not advance to the second stage (quarter-final). He signed a professional three-year contract on 28 July 2006.

In January 2007, he was signed by Portuguesa on a one-year deal, where he met his namesake forward Samuel. In the 2008 season, at first he left for Comercial de Ribeirão Preto, then União São João (on 1 July) and Paraná (on 5 August). He scored the opening goal on 23 January 2008, losing to Santo André 2–1, and played every games in 2008 Campeonato Paulista Série A2.

In the 2009 season, he was signed by Joinville. He signed a new 1-year deal in April, winning 2009 Copa Santa Catarina and 2009 Recopa Sul-Brasileira; finished as the runner-up of 2010 Campeonato Catarinense.

His contract with Joinville expired on 10 May 2010 and was not renewed. On 17 June 2010, he was signed by São Paulo FC until the end of season.

On 31 January 2011, he was signed by Werder Bremen as free agent.

== Honours ==
- Campeonato Paulista Série A2: 2007
- Copa Santa Catarina: 2009

== Career statistics ==
Appearances and goals by club, season and competition
Club	Season	League			National Cup		State League		Other		Total	
Club	Season	Division	Apps	Goals	Apps	Goals	Apps	Goals	Apps	Goals	Apps	Goals
Ituano	2005	Série B	3	1	0	0	?	?	–		?	?
Ituano	2006	Série B	24	0			?	?	–		?	?
Ituano	Total		27	1	0	0	?	?	0	0	?	?
Portuguesa	2007	Série B	9	0	2	0	20	0	–		31	0
Comercial	2008	Regional (SP A2)					19	1	–		19	1
União São João	2008	Regional (SP A2)							–		0	0 (Note: 0 game in 2008 Copa Paulista)
Paraná	2008	Série B	1	0					–		1	0
Joinville	2009	Regional (SC)					20	1	17 (Note: 15 appearances in Copa Santa Catarina, twos in 2009 Recopa Sul-Brasileira)	0	37	1
Joinville	2010	Série D	0	0			20	0	–		20	0
Joinville	Total		0	0	40	1	?	?	0	0	?	?
São Paulo	2010	Série A	8	0					–		8	0
Werder Bremen	2010–11	Bundesliga	0	0	– (Note: Werder Bremen was eliminated before Samuel arrived.)				–		0	0
Career total			45	1	2	0	?	?	17	0	?	?
