= Paulinho (footballer, born 1987) =

Brazilian footballer

Personal information
- Full name: Paulo César Urnau
- Date of birth: March 12, 1987 (age 39)
- Place of birth: Foz do Iguaçu, Brazil
- Height: 1.72 m (5 ft 8 in)
- Position: Defensive midfielder

Team information
- Current team: Juventus Jaraguá

Youth career
- Atlético-PR

Senior career*
Years	Team	Apps	(Gls)
2001–2008	Atlético-PR	13	(0)
2007	→ Rio Branco-PR (Loan)	12	(3)
2008	Ytterhogdals IK	2	(0)
2009–2011	J.Malucelli	33	(7)
2011–	Juventus Jaraguá		
- * Club domestic league appearances and goals

Paulo César Urnau or simply Paulinho (born March 12, 1987, in Foz do Iguaçu) is a Brazilian defensive footballer, who currently plays for Grêmio Esportivo Juventus.
