= 2008 Recopa Sul-Brasileira =

Brazilian football knockout competition

The 2008 Recopa Sul-Brasileira was the 2nd staging of this Brazilian football knockout competition. All matches of the competition were played at Estádio Augusto Bauer, Brusque, Santa Catarina. Four clubs participated of the competition: Pelotas, of Rio Grande do Sul (champion of Copa FGF), Londrina of Paraná (champion of Copa Paraná), Atlético Sorocaba of São Paulo (champion of Copa Paulista de Futebol), and Brusque of Santa Catarina (champion of Copa Santa Catarina).

== Prize money ==
The winner of the competition was awarded a prize money amount of R$30,000, and the runner-up was awarded a prize money amount of R$10,000.

== Competition format ==
The competition is a one legged knockout tournament played in two stages, semifinals and the final.

== Competition stages ==
Semi-finals
December 5 – Brusque
(São Paulo (state)) Atlético Sorocaba	2
(Rio Grande do Sul) Pelotas	0
December 5 - Brusque
(Santa Catarina (state)) Brusque	1 (7)
(Paraná (state)) Londrina	1 (6)

Final
December 7 - Brusque
(São Paulo (state)) Atlético Sorocaba	0
(Santa Catarina (state)) Brusque	1

=== Semifinals ===
December 5, 2008
19:00

(São Paulo (state)) Atlético Sorocaba	2–0	(Rio Grande do Sul) Pelotas
Leandro Diniz 26' 87'	(Report)

Estádio Augusto Bauer, Brusque
Referee: Célio Amorim

December 5, 2008
21:00

(Santa Catarina (state)) Brusque	1–1	(Paraná (state)) Londrina
Tom 18'	(Report)	Rodrigo 10'
Penalties
Rafael Bittencourt (penalty scored) Thiago (penalty scored); William (penalty missed); Marcelo (penalty scored); Baiano (penalty scored); João Neto (penalty missed); Paulinho (penalty scored); Valdo (penalty scored) Xipote (penalty scored)	7–6	(penalty scored) Gabriel (penalty missed) Leandro Barbosa; (penalty scored) Reinaldo; (penalty scored) Felipe; (penalty scored) Rodrigo; (penalty missed) Pedro; (penalty scored) Edimar; (penalty scored) Wesley (penalty missed) Heverson

Estádio Augusto Bauer, Brusque
Referee: Paulo Henrique Bezerra

=== Final ===
December 7, 2008
16:00

(Santa Catarina (state)) Brusque	1–0	(São Paulo (state)) Atlético Sorocaba
Rafael Bitencourt 37'	(Report)

Estádio Augusto Bauer, Brusque
Referee: José Acácio da Rocha

== Champion ==
Recopa Sul-Brasileira
2008 Winners

Brusque
First Title

== Top goalscorers ==
Player	Club	Goals
Leandro Diniz	(São Paulo (state)) Sorocaba	2
Rafael Bitencourt	(Santa Catarina (state)) Brusque	1
Rodrigo	(Paraná (state)) Londrina	1
Tom	(Santa Catarina (state)) Brusque	1
