= Adrianinho =

Adrianinho may refer to:

- Adrianinho (footballer, born 1980), full name Adriano Manfred Laaber, Brazilian football midfielder
- Adrianinho (footballer, born 2004), full name Adriano Silveira Borges Filho, Brazilian football winger

== See also ==
- Adriano
