= Recopa Sul-Brasileira =

- Founded: 2007
- Region: Brazil
- Teams: 4
- Current champions: (Rio Grande do Sul) Cerâmica
- 2010 Recopa Sul-Brasileira

The Recopa Sul-Brasileira was a Brazilian football competition reuniting the champions of four other competitions, which are the Copa FPF, the Copa Paraná, the Copa Santa Catarina and the Copa FGF, respectively played by teams of São Paulo, Paraná, Santa Catarina and Rio Grande do Sul. It was officially recognized by the Brazilian Football Confederation. The competition's first edition was played in 2007.

== Format ==
Starting in 2007, the competition was played by four teams in two stages, the first being the semifinals, and the second being the final, played by the semifinals winners. Every year, one of the four participating states hosts the competition.

== Participating teams ==
=== 2007 ===
In 2007, the following teams participated of the competition:

Club	City	State
Caxias	Caxias do Sul	Rio Grande do Sul
J. Malucelli	São José dos Pinhais	Paraná
Juventus	São Paulo	São Paulo
Marcílio Dias	Itajaí	Santa Catarina

=== 2008 ===
In 2008, the following teams participated of the competition:

Club	City	State
Atlético Sorocaba	Sorocaba	São Paulo
Brusque	Brusque	Santa Catarina
Londrina	Londrina	Paraná
Pelotas	Pelotas	Rio Grande do Sul

=== 2009 ===
In 2009, the following teams participated of the competition:

Club	City	State
Joinville	Joinville	Santa Catarina
Porto Alegre	Porto Alegre	Rio Grande do Sul
Serrano Centro-Sul	Prudentópolis	Paraná
Votoraty	Votorantim	São Paulo

=== 2010 ===
In 2010, the following teams participated of the competition:

Club	City	State
Brusque	Brusque	Santa Catarina
Cerâmica	Gravataí	Rio Grande do Sul
Paulista	Jundiaí	São Paulo
Roma Apucarana	Apucarana	Paraná

== List of champions ==
Year	Host	Final
Year	Host	Winner	Score	Runner-up
2007; Details	(Paraná (state)); Paraná	(Santa Catarina (state)); Marcílio Dias	4–1	(Rio Grande do Sul); Caxias
2008; Details	(Santa Catarina (state)); Santa Catarina	(Santa Catarina (state)); Brusque	1–0	(São Paulo (state)); Atlético Sorocaba
2009; Details	(São Paulo (state)); São Paulo	(Santa Catarina (state)); Joinville	3–2	(Paraná (state)); Serrano Centro-Sul
2010; Details	Rio Grande do Sul	(Rio Grande do Sul); Cerâmica	1–0	(Santa Catarina (state)); Brusque

== Statistics ==
=== By team ===
Team	State	Winner	Runner-up	Years won	Years runner-up
Brusque	Santa Catarina	1	1	2008	2008
Cerâmica	Rio Grande do Sul	1	0	2010
Joinville	Santa Catarina	1	0	2009
Marcílio Dias	Santa Catarina	1	0	2007
Atlético Sorocaba	São Paulo	0	1		2008
Caxias	Rio Grande do Sul	0	1		2007
Serrano Centro-Sul	Paraná	0	1		2009

=== By state ===
State	Winners	Runners-Up	Winning Clubs	Runners-Up
Santa Catarina	3	1	Brusque (1), Joinville (1), Marcílio Dias (1)	Brusque (1)
Rio Grande do Sul	1	1	Cerâmica (1)	Caxias (1)
Paraná	0	1		Serrano Centro-Sul (1)
São Paulo	0	1		Atlético Sorocaba (1)
