= Sport Club Corinthians =

Sport Club Corinthians can refer to the following association football clubs:

- Sport Club Corinthians Alagoano, from Maceió, Alagoas, Brazil
- Sport Club Corinthians Paulista, from São Paulo, São Paulo state, Brazil
- Sport Club Corinthians Paranaense, from São José dos Pinhais, Paraná state, Brazil
