= Imbituba Futebol Clube =

Imbituba
- Full name: Imbituba Futebol Clube
- Nickname(s): Águia do Litoral
- Founded: February 1, 2007
- Ground: Estádio Ninho da Águia, Imbituba, Santa Catarina state, Brazil
- Capacity: 5,000
Home colours	Away colours

Imbituba Futebol Clube, commonly known as Imbituba, is a Brazilian football club based in Imbituba, Santa Catarina state. The club was formerly known as Centro de Futebol Zico Imbituba Futebol Clube.

== History ==
The club was founded on February 1, 2007 as Centro de Futebol Zico Imbituba Futebol Clube due to a partnership between Centro Esportivo Alberto Rodrigues and Rio de Janeiro-base club Centro de Futebol Zico Sociedade Esportiva. They won the Campeonato Catarinense Second Level in 2009, after beating Juventus in the final. After Centro de Futebol Zico Sociedade Esportiva left the partnership, the club was renamed to Imbituba Futebol Clube.

== Honours ==
=== Official tournaments ===
State
Competitions	Titles	Seasons
Campeonato Catarinense Série B	1	2009

=== Runners-up ===
- Campeonato Catarinense Série C (1): 2007

== Stadium ==
Imbituba Futebol Clube play their home games at Estádio Emília Mendes Rodrigues, nicknamed Estádio Ninho da Águia. The stadium has a maximum capacity of 5,000 people.
