= Clube Esportivo Paysandu =

Paysandu
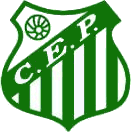
- Full name: Clube Esportivo Paysandu
- Founded: December 30, 1918
- Ground: Estádio Carlos Renaux, Brusque, Santa Catarina state, Brazil
Home colours	Away colours

Clube Esportivo Paysandu, commonly known as Paysandu, is a Brazilian social club and a former football club based in Brusque, Santa Catarina state.

== History ==
The club was founded on December 30, 1918 as Sport Club Paysandú. The club was eventually renamed to Clube Esportivo Paysandu They won the Campeonato Catarinense Second Level in 1986. Paysandu and Carlos Renaux fused on October 12, 1987 to form Brusque Futebol Clube.

== Stadium ==
Clube Esportivo Paysandu played their home games at Estádio Carlos Renaux.

== Honours ==
=== Official tournaments ===
State
Competitions	Titles	Seasons
Campeonato Catarinense Série B	1	1986

=== Others tournaments ===
==== State Regional ====
- Campeonato do Vale do Itajaí (1): 1940

==== City ====
- Campeonato de Brusque (1): 1959

=== Runners-up ===
- Campeonato Catarinense (1): 1956
