= Samuel Lopes =

Brazilian footballer (born 1984)

Personal information
- Full name: Samuel Lopes da Cunha
- Date of birth: 7 February 1984 (age 42)
- Place of birth: Colatina, Brazil
- Height: 1.82 m (5 ft 11 1/2 in)
- Position: Forward

Team information
- Current team: São Raimundo-PA

Youth career
- Grêmio

Senior career*
Years	Team	Apps	(Gls)
2005–2007	Grêmio	22	(5)
2006	→ Juventude (loan)	0	(0)
2006	→ Avaí (loan)	12	(2)
2007	→ Portuguesa (loan)	5	(0)
2007	Vila Nova	14	(2)
2008	Paysandu	6	(1)
2009	Veranópolis	0	(0)
2010	Nacional (PR)	0	(0)
2010–2011	Águia de Marabá	8	(0)
2011	Pelotas	0	(0)
2011–	São Raimundo-PA		
- * Club domestic league appearances and goals

Samuel Lopes da Cunha (born 7 February 1984) is a Brazilian footballer who plays for São Raimundo Esporte Clube (PA).

== Biography ==
=== Grêmio ===
A youth product of Grêmio, he signed a 3-year contract in August 2004. He played five matches in the 2005 Copa do Brasil for Grêmio. He also won promotion to the 2006 Campeonato Brasileiro Série A and the Série B. In the 2006 season he was loaned to Juventude. The loan was pre-matured in July and he was transferred to Avaí.

=== Portuguesa ===
In January 2007 he joined the Portuguesa for a one-year contract. At Portuguesa, he was known as Samuel Lopes to avoid confusion with his namesake, Samuel.

He scored five goals in the first seven games of the Campeonato Paulista Série A2. Portuguesa was the champion and was promoted to Série A1. He missed the rest of the state matches after round 21 and his goals stood at five. In the 2007 Campeonato Brasileiro Série B he played five times.

=== Vila Nova ===
He left for the Vila Nova on 5 September. He won promotion to the 2008 Campeonato Brasileiro Série B.

=== Paysandu ===
In January 2008 he signed a contract with the Paysandu until the end of Campeonato Paraense. He finished as the runner-up of the second half of the league and the third overall. He scored nine goals in eleven games. He was re-signed by the Paysandu in August, until the end of the 2008 Campeonato Brasileiro Série C. The team failed to advance to the final stage of the Série C (round 19 to 32).

=== Veranópolis ===
In January 2009 he returned to Rio Grande do Sul, to join the Veranópolis. The club finished fourth place in the 2009 Campeonato Gaúcho, along with two other Gaúcho teams.

=== Águia de Marabá ===
After 6 months of inactivity, he joined the Nacional de Rolândia. In February he joined the Águia de Marabá until the end of 2010 Campeonato Paraense. The club offered him another contract until the end of the 2010 Campeonato Brasileiro Série C on 12 July.

In January 2011, he extended his contract with the Águia de Marabá for 1 more year. On 23 February 2011, Lance! reported that Samuel was training with the America Football Club and was about to register in the FFERJ, but the deal never materialized.

== Honours ==
- Campeonato Paulista Série A2: 2007

== Career statistics ==
Club performance			League		Cup		League Cup		Total	
Season	Club	League	Apps	Goals	Apps	Goals	Apps	Goals	Apps	Goals
Brazil			League		Copa do Brasil		League Cup		Total	
2005	Grêmio	Série B	22	5	5	2	?	4	?	11
2006	Juventude	Série A	0	0			?	?	?	?
2006	Avaí	Série B	12	2					12	2
2007	Portuguesa	Série B	5	0	2	0	16	5	23	5
2007	Vila Nova	Série C	14	2					14	2
2008	Paysandu	Série C	6	1			11	9	18	10
2009	Veranópolis	Regional (RS1)					4	0	4	0
2010	Nacional (PR)	Regional (PR1)					1	0	1	0
2010	Águia de Marabá	Série C	8	0			?	5	?	5
2011	Águia de Marabá	Série C	0	0			0	0	0	0
Career total			67	10	7	2	?	?	?	?

Note: State Leagues are marked as League Cup
