= Matheus Bertotto =

Brazilian footballer

Personal information
- Full name: Matheus Hanauer Bertotto
- Date of birth: 15 June 1993 (age 33)
- Place of birth: Porto Alegre, Brasil
- Height: 1.89 m (6 ft 2 in)
- Position: Midfielder

Youth career
- 2009–2013: Pedra Branca
- 2010: → Resende (loan)
- 2012: → Resende (loan)
- 2013: → Internacional (loan)

Senior career*
Years	Team	Apps	(Gls)
2012–2013	Pedra Branca	0	(0)
2012	→ Resende (loan)	0	(0)
2014–2018	Internacional	14	(0)
2016	→ Joinville (loan)	13	(1)
2017	→ Ferroviária (loan)	0	(0)
2018	Veranópolis	0	(0)
2018	Juventude	22	(1)
2019	Londrina	17	(1)
2020	Novo Hamburgo	0	(0)
- * Club domestic league appearances and goals as of 18:46, 17 August 2020 (UTC)

Matheus Hanauer Bertotto (born 15 June 1993) is a Brazilian footballer who plays as a midfielder.

== Career ==
=== Pedrabranca ===
Born in Porto Alegre, Rio Grande do Sul, Bertotto began his career in the youth ranks of Pedrabranca Futebol Clube. In 2011, he trained with Manchester United but the move fell through due to his lack of an EU passport. He also played friendlies for Club Atlético Independiente in Argentina.

He was loaned to Resende Futebol Clube in the 2012 Campeonato Carioca; initially an unused substitute on 29 January in a 3–2 win over Olaria Atlético Clube at the Estádio do Trabalhador, three days later he made his professional debut by replacing Emerson for the final 29 minutes of a 3–0 loss at Macaé Esporte Futebol Clube. He made eleven more appearances over the campaign as Resende finished fifth and qualified for the next year's Copa do Brasil.

=== Internacional ===
On returning to Pedrabranca, Bertotto was loaned to Sport Club Internacional, one of the giants of his state, and helped them win the 2013 U-20 Cup, scoring once in the final against Sociedade Esportiva Palmeiras. Despite interest from Clube Atlético Paranaense, this loan was made permanent, with Bertotto signing a five-year deal; Inter paid R$500,000 for 50% of his economic rights.

He was an unused substitute for Inter on 18 January 2014, in the first game of that year's Campeonato Gaúcho, but made no further matchday appearances for the eventual champions. He made his debut for the Colorado on 16 August, replacing Rafael Moura for the final five minutes of a 1–0 win at Goiás Esporte Clube in that year's Campeonato Brasileiro Série A; he totalled nine appearances, five of which starts. At the start of the following year, he made two appearances as the team defended their Gaúcho title.

== Honours ==
Internacional

- Campeonato Gaúcho: 2014, 2015
