= Estádio Augusto Bauer =

Football stadium in Brusque, Brazil

Coordinates: 27.1014°S 48.9161°W

- Gigantinho
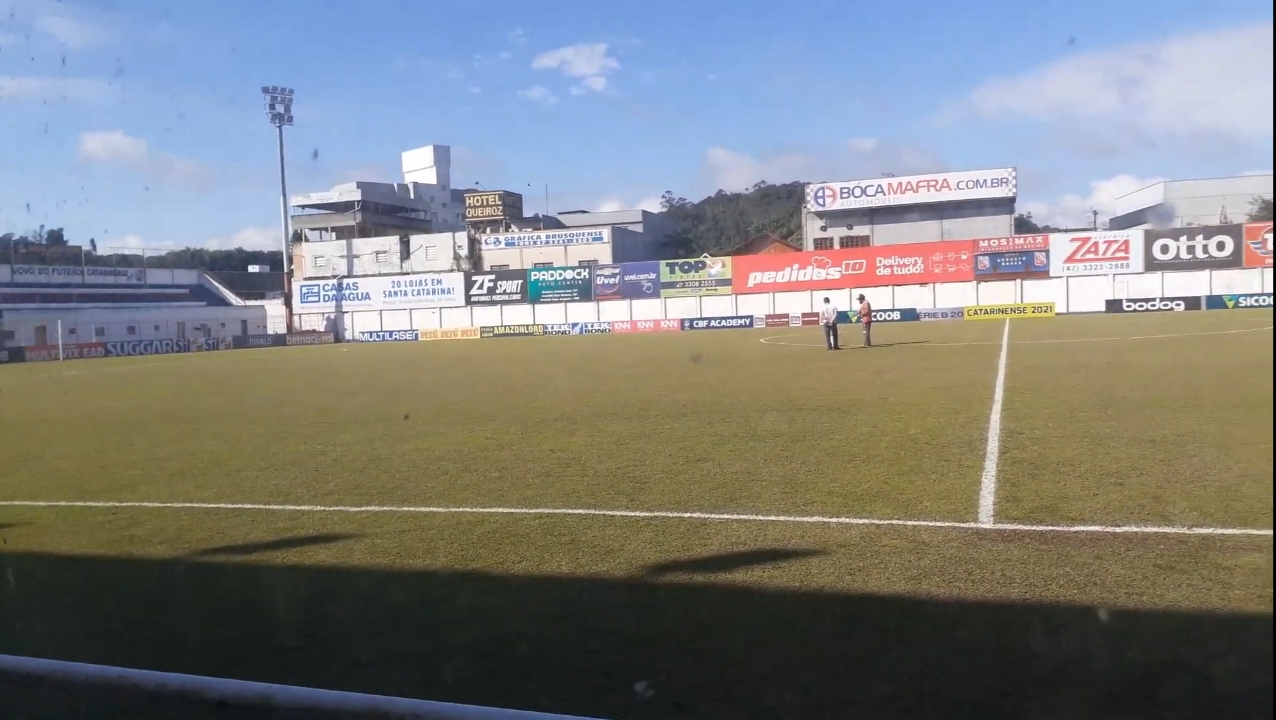
- Interactive map of Estádio Augusto Bauer
- Location: Brusque, Santa Catarina, Brazil
- Owner: Clube Atlético Carlos Renaux
- Capacity: 6,000
- Surface: Grass

Construction
- Opened: 7 June 1931

Tenants
- Clube Atlético Carlos Renaux; Brusque Futebol Clube

Estádio Augusto Bauer, also known as the Arena Simon for sponsorship reasons, is a football stadium located in Brusque city, Santa Catarina state, Brazil. It is the home of Clube Atlético Carlos Renaux, which rents the stadium to Brusque Futebol Clube so they can also play there. The stadium has a maximum capacity of 6,000 people and was built in 1931.

== History ==
The stadium was inaugurated on 7 June 1931, when Marcílio Dias beat Carlos Renaux 1–0. The stadium was expanded between the 1950s and 1960, with the inclusion of new bleachers, a bigger football field, an embankment and floodlights. In the 1980s, new stands were built. In 1984, a major flood struck the city of Brusque, destroying a large part of the stadium. After a period of recovery, it was used again. In 2012 it underwent another remodeling, with new fencing, seats, restrooms and other improvements. In 2024 it was completely renovated, gaining a roof over the back stands, synthetic turf, new lighting, new locker rooms, restrooms, restaurants and much more.
