= Udeh Clinton =

Nigerian footballer

Personal information
- Full name: Udeh Arinze Clinton
- Date of birth: 15 January 2002 (age 24)
- Place of birth: Orlu, Imo, Nigéria
- Height: 1.74 m (5 ft 9 in)
- Position: Forward

Team information
- Current team: Brusque (on loan from Cianorte)

Youth career
- Giant Brillars FC
- 2021–2022: Londrina

Senior career*
Years	Team	Apps	(Gls)
2023	Londrina	29	(4)
2024	Vitória de Guimarães	0	(0)
2024	Tondela	1	(0)
2024–	Cianorte	17	(1)
2025–	→ Brusque (loan)	40	(3)
- * Club domestic league appearances and goals as of 9 November 2026

Udeh Arinze Clinton (born 15 January 2002) is a Nigerian professional footballer who plays as a forward for Brusque, on loan from Cianorte.

== Club career ==
Born in Orlu, Nigeria, Clinton played for Londrina EC youth teams in 2021 and 2022, and for the first team in 2023. In October, he obtained a court order for non-payment by SM Sports, Londrina's management company, and signed with Vitória de Guimarães from Portugal. Without playing, he was transferred to CD Tondela where he made only one appearance, against Belenenses. He returned to Brazil in mid-2024 to play for Cianorte, where he stood out as the player with the most assists in the 2025 Campeonato Paranaense. In August, he signed a loan contract with Brusque FC.

On 6 January 2026, Clinton scored the first goal of the season in Brazilian football, against Chapecoense in the Santa Catarina state championship.
