= Esporte Clube Próspera =

Próspera
- Full name: Esporte Clube Próspera
- Nickname: Time da Raça
- Founded: March 29, 1946 (80 years ago)
- Ground: Estádio Engenheiro Mário Balsini, Criciúma, Santa Catarina state, Brazil
- Capacity: 5,000
- 2023: Catarinense Série B, relegated on court
- Website: http://www.timedaraca.com.br/
Home colours	Away colours

Esporte Clube Próspera, commonly known as Próspera, is a Brazilian football club based in Criciúma, Santa Catarina state.

== History ==
The club was founded on March 29, 1946. They won the Campeonato Catarinense Second Level in 2005.

== Honours ==
=== Official tournaments ===
State
Competitions	Titles	Seasons
Campeonato Catarinense Série B	1	2020
Campeonato Catarinense Série C	2^{s}	2005, 2018

- record
- ^{S} shared record

=== Others tournaments ===
==== State Regional ====
- Campeonato Regional da LARM (2): 1962, 1964

=== Runners-up ===
- Campeonato Catarinense (1): 1971
- Copa Santa Catarina (1): 2006
- Campeonato Catarinense Série B (1): 1991

== Stadium ==
Esporte Clube Próspera play their home games at Estádio Engenheiro Mário Balsini. The stadium has a maximum capacity of 5,000 people.
