= Campeonato Catarinense Série B =

Football league in Santa Catarina, Brazil

- Organising body: FCF
- Founded: 1986; 40 years ago
- Country: Brazil
- State: (Santa Catarina (state)) Santa Catarina
- Level on pyramid: 2
- Promotion to: Campeonato Catarinense
- Relegation to: Série C
- Current champions: Hercílio Luz (1st title) (2026)
- Most championships: Brusque; Inter de Lages; Joinville; Marcílio Dias (3 titles each)
- Website: FCF Official website

The Campeonato Catarinense – Série B is the second tier of the professional state football league in the Brazilian state of Santa Catarina. It is run by the Santa Catarina Football Federation (FCF).

== List of champions ==
=== Segunda Divisão ===
Season	Champions	Runners-up
1986	Paysandu (1)	Blumenau
1987	Blumenau (1)	Figueirense
1988	Araranguá (1)	Canoinhas
1989	Caçadorense (1)	Inter de Lages
1990	Inter de Lages (1)	Juventus
1991	Concórdia EC (1)	Próspera
1992	AD Joaçaba (1)	Xanxerense
1993	Atlético de Ibirama (1)	Blumenau
1994	Avaí (1)	Hercílio Luz
1995	Not held	
1996	Alto Vale (1)	Biguaçu
1997	Brusque (1)	Barra Velha
1998	Fraiburgo (1)	Botafogo
1999	Marcílio Dias (1)	Itajaí EC
2000	Inter de Lages (2)	Joaçaba EC
2001	Atlético de Ibirama (2)	Caxias
2002	Caxias (1)	Tiradentes
2003	Guarani de Palhoça (1)	União de Timbó

=== Divisão Intermediária ===
Season	Champions	Runners-up
2004	CA Lages (1)	Atlético de Ibirama
2005	Joinville (1)	Marcílio Dias
2006	Joinville (2)	Marcílio Dias
2007	Joinville (3)	Camboriú
2008	Brusque (2)	Juventus
2009	CFZ Imbituba (1)	Juventus
2010	Marcílio Dias (2)	Concórdia AC
2011	Camboriú (1)	Atlético de Ibirama
2012	Guarani de Palhoça (2)	Juventus
2013	Marcílio Dias (3)	Brusque

=== Série B ===
Season	Champions	Runners-up
2014	Inter de Lages (3)	Guarani de Palhoça
2015	Brusque (3)	Camboriú
2016	Almirante Barroso (1)	Atlético Tubarão
2017	Concórdia AC (1)	Hercílio Luz
2018	Metropolitano (1)	Marcílio Dias
2019	Almirante Barroso (2)	Concórdia AC
2020	Próspera (1)	Hercílio Luz
2021	Barra (1)	Camboriú
2022	Criciúma (1)	Atlético Catarinense
2023	Nação (1)	Inter de Lages
2024	Caravaggio (1)	Santa Catarina
2025	Carlos Renaux (1)	Camboriú
2026	Hercílio Luz (1)	Metropolitano

=== Notes ===
- Caçadorense is the same club of SE Kindermann who competed at the women's level.
- CFZ Imbituba is the currently Imbituba FC.

== Titles by team ==
Teams in bold still active.

Rank	Club	Winners	Winning years
1	**Brusque**	3	1997, 2008, 2015
1	**Inter de Lages**	3	1990, 2000, 2014
1	**Joinville**	3	2005, 2006, 2007
1	**Marcílio Dias**	3	1999, 2010, 2013
5	Almirante Barroso	2	2016, 2019
5	Atlético de Ibirama	2	1993, 2001
5	**Guarani de Palhoça**	2	2003, 2012
8	AD Joaçaba	1	1992
8	Alto Vale	1	1996
8	Araranguá	1	1988
8	**Avaí**	1	1994
8	**Barra**	1	2021
8	**Blumenau**	1	1987
8	CA Lages	1	2004
8	**Camboriú**	1	2011
8	**Caravaggio**	1	2024
8	**Carlos Renaux**	1	2025
8	Caxias	1	2002
8	**Concórdia AC**	1	2017
8	Concórdia EC	1	1991
8	**Criciúma**	1	2022
8	Fraiburgo	1	1998
8	**Hercílio Luz**	1	2026
8	**Imbituba**	1	2009
8	Kindermann	1	1989
8	**Metropolitano**	1	2018
8	**Nação**	1	2023
8	Paysandu	1	1986
8	Próspera	1	2020

=== By city ===
City	Championships	Clubs
Brusque	5	Brusque (3), Carlos Renaux (1), Paysandu (1)
Itajaí	5	Marcílio Dias (3), Almirante Barroso (2)
Joinville	5	Joinville (3), Caxias (1), Nação (1)
Lages	4	Internacional (3), CA Lages (1)
Blumenau	2	Blumenau (1), Metropolitano (1)
Concórdia	2	Concórdia AC (1), Concórdia EC (1)
Criciúma	2	Criciúma (1), Próspera (1)
Ibirama	2	Atlético de Ibirama (2)
Palhoça	2	Guarani (2)
Araranguá	1	Araranguá (1)
Balneário Camboriú	1	Barra (1)
Caçador	1	Kindermann (1)
Camboriú	1	Camboriú (1)
Florianópolis	1	Avaí (1)
Fraiburgo	1	Fraiburgo (1)
Joaçaba	1	AD Joaçaba (1)
Imbituba	1	Imbituba (1)
Nova Veneza	1	Caravaggio (1)
Rio do Sul	1	Alto Vale (1)
Tubarão	1	Hercílio Luz (1)
