= Associação Xanxerense de Futebol =

Xanxerense
- Full name: Associação Xanxerense de Futebol
- Founded: May 13, 1976; 50 years ago
- Ground: Estádio Josué Anoni, Xanxerê, Santa Catarina state, Brazil
- Capacity: 5,000
Home colours	Away colours

Associação Xanxerense de Futebol, commonly known as Xanxerense, is a Brazilian football club based in Xanxerê, Santa Catarina state.

== History ==
The club was founded on May 13, 1978. They finished in the second position in the Campeonato Catarinense Série B in 1992, losing the competition to Joaçaba.

== Honours ==
=== Runners-up ===
- Campeonato Catarinense Série B (1): 1992

== Stadium ==
Associação Xanxerense de Futebol play their home games at Estádio Josué Anoni. The stadium has a maximum capacity of 5,000 people.
