= 2007 Recopa Sul-Brasileira =

Brazilian football competition

The 2007 Recopa Sul-Brasileira was the 1st staging of this Brazilian football knockout competition. All matches of the competition were played at Estádio Janguito Malucelli, Curitiba, Paraná. Four clubs participated of the competition: Caxias, of Rio Grande do Sul (champion of Copa FGF), J. Malucelli of Paraná (champion of Copa Paraná), Juventus of São Paulo (champion of Copa FPF), and Marcílio Dias of Santa Catarina (champion of Copa Santa Catarina).

== Prize money ==
The winner of the competition was awarded a prize money amount of R$30,000, and the runner-up was awarded a prize money amount of R$10,000.

== Competition stages ==
Semi-finals
December 5 – Curitiba
(Santa Catarina (state)) Marcílio Dias	4
(São Paulo (state)) Juventus	1
December 6 - Curitiba
(Paraná (state)) J. Malucelli	1
(Rio Grande do Sul) Caxias	2

Final
December 8 – Curitiba
(Santa Catarina (state)) Marcílio Dias	4
(Rio Grande do Sul) Caxias	1

=== Semifinals ===
December 5, 2007
16:00

(Santa Catarina (state)) Marcílio Dias	4–1	(São Paulo (state)) Juventus
Luiz Ricardo 1' 46'; Fabrício 36'; Claudemir 83'	(Report)	Xuxa 45'

Janguito Malucelli, Curitiba
Referee: Antônio dos Santos (Paraná)
December 6, 2007
16:25^{(1)}

(Paraná (state)) J. Malucelli	1–2 (AET)	(Rio Grande do Sul) Caxias
Diogo 6' (pen)	(Report)	Sandro 32'; Fabrício 94'

Janguito Malucelli, Curitiba
Referee: Maurício dos Santos (Paraná)

^{(1)} Due to rains, the match start was delayed 25 minutes.

=== Final ===
December 8, 2007
16:00

(Santa Catarina (state)) Marcílio Dias	4–1	(Rio Grande do Sul) Caxias
Váldson 20'; Luiz Ricardo 34' 70' 90+2'	(Report)	Castor 50'

Janguito Malucelli, Curitiba

== Champion ==
Recopa Sul-Brasileira
2007 Winners

Marcílio Dias
First Title

== Top goalscorers ==
Player	Club	Goals
Luiz Ricardo	(Santa Catarina (state)) Marcílio Dias	5
Castor	(Rio Grande do Sul) Caxias	1
Claudemir	(Santa Catarina (state)) Marcílio Dias	1
Diogo	(Paraná (state)) J. Malucelli	1
Fabrício	(Rio Grande do Sul) Caxias	1
Fabrício	(Santa Catarina (state)) Marcílio Dias	1
Sandro	(Rio Grande do Sul) Caxias	1
Váldson	(Santa Catarina (state)) Marcílio Dias	1
Xuxa	(São Paulo (state)) Juventus	1
