= 2009 Recopa Sul-Brasileira =

Football Competition

The 2009 Recopa Sul-Brasileira was the 3rd staging of this Brazilian football knockout competition. All matches of the competition were played at Estádio Municipal Domenico Paolo Metidieri, Votorantim, São Paulo. Four clubs participated of the competition: Porto Alegre, of Rio Grande do Sul (runner-up of Copa Arthur Dellagrave), Serrano Centro-Sul of Paraná (champion of Campeonato Paranense Second Level), Votoraty of São Paulo (champion of Copa Paulista de Futebol), and Joinville of Santa Catarina (champion of Copa Santa Catarina).

== Prize money ==
The winner of the competition was awarded a prize money amount of R$30,000, and the runner-up was awarded a prize money amount of R$10,000.

== Competition format ==
The competition is a one legged knockout tournament played in two stages, semifinals and the final.

== Competition stages ==
Semi-finals
December 12 – Votorantim
(Rio Grande do Sul) Porto Alegre	2
(Santa Catarina (state)) Joinville	6
December 12 - Votorantim
(São Paulo (state)) Votoraty	0
(Paraná (state)) Serrano Centro-Sul	2

Final
December 13 - Votorantim
(Santa Catarina (state)) Joinville	3
(Paraná (state)) Serrano Centro-Sul	2

=== Semifinals ===
December 12, 2009
14:00

(Rio Grande do Sul) Porto Alegre	2–6	(Santa Catarina (state)) Joinville
Rodrigo Santos 15'; Adão 45+2'	(Report)	Lima 7' 11' 64' 76' 87'; Elton 74'

Estádio Municipal Domenico Paolo Metidieri, Votorantim
Referee: Magno de Souza Lima Neto

December 12, 2009
16:00

(São Paulo (state)) Votoraty	0–2	(Paraná (state)) Serrano Centro-Sul
	(Report)	Massai 51'; Joel 88'

Estádio Municipal Domenico Paolo Metidieri, Votorantim
Referee: Kléber José de Melo

=== Final ===
December 13, 2009
10:00

(Santa Catarina (state)) Joinville	3–2	(Paraná (state)) Serrano Centro-Sul
Lima 9'; Ricardinho 61'; Lino 90+2'	(Report)	Rocha 43'; Thiaguinho 84'

Estádio Municipal Domenico Paolo Metidieri, Votorantim
Referee: Norberto Luciano da Silveira

== Champion ==
Recopa Sul-Brasileira
2009 Winners

Joinville
First Title

== Top goalscorers ==
Player	Club	Goals
Lima	(Santa Catarina (state)) Joinville	6
Adão	(Rio Grande do Sul) Porto Alegre	1
Elton	(Santa Catarina (state)) Joinville	1
Joel	(Paraná (state)) Serrano Centro-Sul	1
Lino	(Santa Catarina (state)) Joinville	1
Massai	(Paraná (state)) Serrano Centro-Sul	1
Ricardinho	(Santa Catarina (state)) Joinville	1
Rocha	(Paraná (state)) Serrano Centro-Sul	1
Rodrigo Santos	(Rio Grande do Sul) Porto Alegre	1
Thiaguinho	(Paraná (state)) Serrano Centro-Sul	1
