= Adrianinho (footballer, born 2004) =

Brazilian footballer

Personal information
- Full name: Adriano Silveira Borges Filho
- Date of birth: 14 June 2004 (age 22)
- Place of birth: Boa Vista, Roraima, Brazil
- Height: 1.75 m (5 ft 9 in)
- Position: Winger

Team information
- Current team: Brusque

Youth career
- 2020–2021: São Raimundo-RR
- 2021: Cruzeiro
- 2021–2025: Criciúma

Senior career*
Years	Team	Apps	(Gls)
2022–2025	Criciúma	11	(0)
2025	→ Noroeste (loan)	6	(0)
2025–	Brusque	33	(6)
- * Club domestic league appearances and goals as of 9 November 2026

Adriano Silveira Borges Filho (born 14 June 2004), better known as Adrianinho, is a Brazilian professional footballer who plays as a winger for Campeonato Brasileiro Série C club Brusque.

== Career ==
Having played for the youth teams of São Raimundo-RR, Cruzeiro, and Criciúma, Adrianinho was one of the standout players in the team's campaign that reached the semi-finals of the 2025 Copa São Paulo de Futebol Júnior. After a loan spell at Noroeste, he was permanently signed by Brusque FC. In his debut, he scored his first goal for the club in a match against Botafogo-PB.

== Honours ==
São Raimundo

- Campeonato Roraimense: 2020

Criciúma

- Campeonato Catarinense: 2024
- Campeonato Catarinense Série B: 2022
