= Prudentópolis Futebol Clube =

Prudentópolis
- Full name: Prudentópolis Futebol Clube
- Nickname: Tigrão
- Founded: September 1, 2007 (18 years ago)
- Ground: Estádio Newton Agibert
- Capacity: 3,500
- President: Valdir Luiz Cagnini
- Head coach: Paulo Massaro
Home colors	Away colors

Prudentópolis Futebol Clube, commonly known as Prudentópolis, is a Brazilian football club based in Prudentópolis, Paraná state. The club was formerly known as Serrano Centro-Sul Esporte Clube.

== History ==
The club was founded on November 1, 2007 as Serrano Centro-Sul Esporte Clube. The club won the Campeonato Paranaense Third Level in 2008, after beating São José-PR in the final. Serrano won the Campeonato Paranaense Second Level in 2009, qualifying to compete in the 2009 Recopa Sul-Brasileira, when they were defeated in the final by Joinville 3–2, on December 13, 2009 at Estádio Municipal Domenico Paolo Metidieri, in Votorantim, São Paulo state. They competed in the Campeonato Paranaense in 2010, when they finished in the 12th place out of 14 teams, thus being relegated to the following year Second Level. The club was renamed to Prudentópolis Futebol Clube in 2013.

== Honours ==
=== Regional ===
- Recopa Sul-Brasileira
  - Runners-up (1): 2009

=== State ===
- Campeonato Paranaense Série Prata
  - Winners (1): 2009
  - Runners-up (2): 2013, 2016
- Campeonato Paranaense Série Bronze
  - Winners (2): 2008, 2025
- Campeonato Paranaense do Interior
  - Winners (1): 2014

== Stadium ==
Prudentópolis Futebol Clube play their home games at Estádio Newton Agibert. The stadium has a maximum capacity of 3,500 people.
