= Clube Atlético Alto Vale =

Atlético Alto Vale
- Full name: Clube Atlético Alto Vale
- Nickname(s): Rubro-Negro
- Founded: October 21, 1995
- Dissolved: 2003; 22 years ago
- Ground: Estádio Alfredo João Krieck, Rio do Sul, Santa Catarina state, Brazil
- Capacity: 8,000
Home colours	Away colours

Clube Atlético Alto Vale, commonly known as Atlético Alto Vale, was a Brazilian football club based in Rio do Sul, Santa Catarina state.

== History ==
The club was founded on October 21, 1995. They won the Campeonato Catarinense Second Level in 1996. In 2000 won their greatest conquer: "returno Catarinão". In 2006 the club had licencied from professional football. In 2022 another professional team showed in the city, and Alto Vale's return became more distant. The newer professional team was: Santa Catarina Clube.

== Honours ==
=== Official tournaments ===
State
Competitions	Titles	Seasons
Campeonato Catarinense Série B	1	1996

== Stadium ==
Clube Atlético Alto Vale play their home games at Estádio Alfredo João Krieck. The stadium has a maximum capacity of 8,000 people.
