= Clube Atlético Carlos Renaux =

Association football club in Brazil

Carlos Renaux
- Full name: Clube Atlético Carlos Renaux
- Nicknames: Tricolor; Vovô
- Founded: September 14, 1913
- Ground: Estádio Augusto Bauer, Brusque, Santa Catarina state, Brazil
- Capacity: 5,000
Home colours	Away colours

Clube Atlético Carlos Renaux, commonly known as Carlos Renaux, is a Brazilian football club based in Brusque, Santa Catarina state. They won the Campeonato Catarinense twice.

== History ==
The club was founded on September 14, 1913, as Sport Club Brusquense. The club was renamed to Clube Atlético Carlos Renaux on March 19, 1944. They won the Campeonato Catarinense in 1950 and in 1953. Carlos Renaux and Paysandu-SC fused on October 12, 1987 to form Brusque Futebol Clube.

However, they were disestablished in 1987 to create Brusque Futebol Clube, the club returned in 1997, remains active and plays in the second tier of Campeonato Catarinense.

== Stadium ==
Clube Atlético Carlos Renaux played their home games at Estádio Augusto Bauer. The stadium has a maximum capacity of 5,000 people.

== Honours ==
=== Official tournaments ===
State
Competitions	Titles	Seasons
Campeonato Catarinense	2	1950, 1953
Campeonato Catarinense Série B	1	2025

=== Others tournaments ===
==== State Regional ====
- Campeonato do Vale do Itajaí (5): 1922, 1941, 1942, 1943, 1945
- Torneio Início do Vale do Itajaí (3): 1940, 1941, 1943

==== City ====
- Campeonato Blumenauense (5): 1950, 1952, 1953, 1954, 1958
- Campeonato Brusquense (6): 1959, 1960, 1961, 1962, 1963, 1987
- Torneio Início de Blumenau (4): 1951, 1952, 1954, 1957
- Torneio Início de Brusque (1): 1959

=== Runners-up ===
- Campeonato Catarinense (3): 1952, 1957, 1958
