= J. Malucelli Futebol =

Football club from Paraná, Brazil

J. Malucelli
- Full name: J. Malucelli Futebol
- Nickname: Jotinha (Little J)
- Founded: December 27, 2000
- Dissolved: December 5, 2017
- Ground: Eco-Estádio Janguito Malucelli, Curitiba, Brazil
- Capacity: 6,000
Home colors	Away colors

J. Malucelli Futebol, usually known simply as J. Malucelli, and formerly known as Malutrom and as Corinthians Paranaense, was a Brazilian football team from the city of Curitiba, Paraná state, founded on December 27, 1994. The club competed in the Copa João Havelange in 2000, and in the Campeonato Brasileiro Série C in 2008.

== History ==
The club was founded on December 27, 1994 as Clube Malutrom by the Malucelli and Trombini families. Malutrom is a portmanteau of Malucelli and Trombini

In 2000, Malutrom won the Copa João Havelange Green and White Module playoff, beating Uberlândia, and thus qualifying to the Eightfinals, where the club was eliminated by Cruzeiro.

In 2005, the club was renamed to J. Malucelli Futebol.

In 2007, the club won the Copa Paraná, after beating Londrina in the final, at Eco-Estádio Janguito Malucelli, and thus qualifying to that year's Recopa Sul-Brasileira, and also qualifying to the following year's Copa do Brasil and Campeonato Brasileiro Série C. The club was eliminated by Caxias in the 2007 Recopa Sul-Brasileira semifinals.

=== Corinthians Paranaense ===
The club was renamed to Sport Club Corinthians Paranaense in 2009, after being officially registered at the Brazilian Football Confederation. The club adopted a logo and kits similar to the Sport Club Corinthians Paulista ones.

=== J. Malucelli again ===
After three years as Corinthians Paranaense, the club was officially renamed back to J. Malucelli Futebol on August 10, 2012. After being relegated in the Paraná championship of 2017, the team shut down.

== Honours ==
=== National unofficial ===
- Copa João Havelange – Módulos Verde e Branco
  - Winners (1): 2000

=== State ===
- Campeonato Paranaense
  - Runners-up (1): 2009
- Copa Paraná
  - Winners (1): 2007
- Campeonato Paranaense Série Prata
  - Winners (1): 1998
