= Estádio Janguito Malucelli =

Football stadium in Curitiba, Brazil

Coordinates: 25.4312°S 49.3187°W

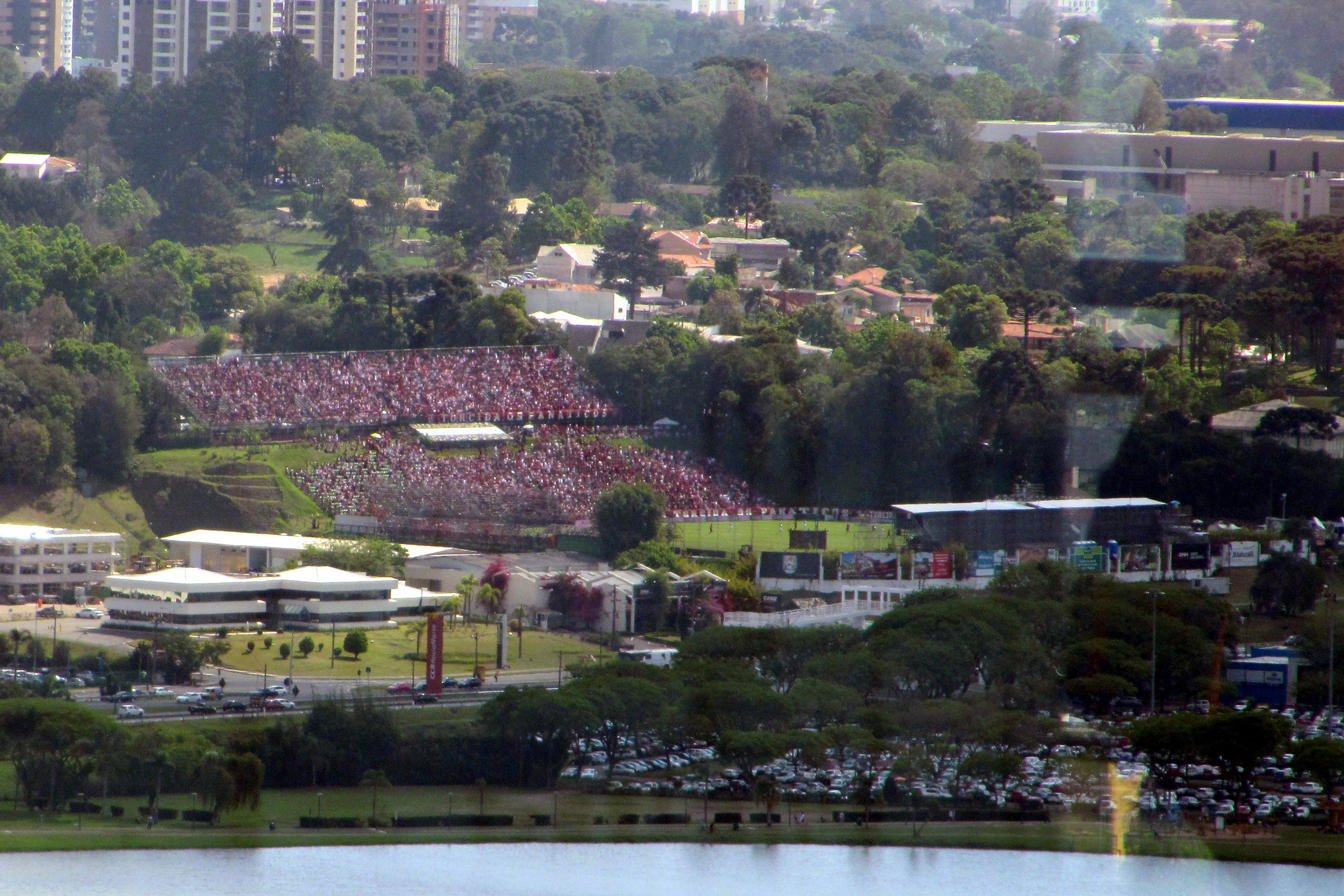
Ecoestádio on a match day, in October 2012.

Estádio Janguito Malucelli was a football stadium located in Curitiba, Brazil.

== History ==
The Estádio Janguito Malucelli opened in 2007. The stadium had a capacity of around 4200. Estádio Janguito Malucelli received media attention for being the first "ecological stadium in Brazil".

In 2012, Atlético Paranaense played its games at the stadium, due to its home stadium being closed for renovation works for the 2014 World Cup, so the Estádio Janguito Malucelli underwent renovation and expansion to accommodate Brazilian second tier games.
