= Votoraty Futebol Clube =

Votoraty
- Full name: Votoraty Futebol Clube
- Nickname(s): Tigre de Concreto
- Founded: May 12, 2005 (19 years ago)
- Ground: Estádio Domênico Paolo Mettidieri, Votorantim, São Paulo state, Brazil
- Capacity: 10,034
Home colors	Away colors

Votoraty Futebol Clube, commonly known as Votoraty, is a Brazilian football club from Votorantim, São Paulo state. They competed in the Copa do Brasil once.

== History ==
The club was founded on May 12, 2005 by a group of businessmen. They won the Campeonato Paulista Série A3 and the Copa Paulista de Futebol in 2009. Votoraty competed in the Copa do Brasil in 2010, when they were eliminated in the Second Stage by Grêmio.

== Honours ==
- Copa Paulista
  - Winners (1): 2009
- Campeonato Paulista Série A3
  - Winners (1): 2009

== Stadium ==
Votoraty Futebol Clube play their home games at Estádio Domênico Paolo Mettidieri. The stadium has a maximum capacity of 10,034 people.
