= Brusque Futebol Clube =

Brazilian association football club based in Brusque, Santa Catarina, Brazil

Brusque
- Full name: Brusque Futebol Clube
- Nicknames: Bruscão (Big Brusque); Quadricolor (Four-colour); Marreco (Garganey)
- Founded: 12 October 1987; 39 years ago
- Ground: Augusto Bauer
- Capacity: 5,000
- President: Danilo Rezini
- Head coach: Filipe Gouveia
- League: Campeonato Brasileiro Série C Campeonato Catarinense
- 2025 2025: Série C, 6th of 20; Catarinense, 6th of 12
- Website: www.brusquefutebolclube.com.br
Home colors	Away colors	Third colors

Brusque Futebol Clube, commonly referred to as Brusque, is a Brazilian professional club based in Brusque, Santa Catarina founded on 12 October 1987.

== History ==
The club was founded on 12 October 1987, after Paysandu-SC and Carlos Renaux fused.

The club competed in the Campeonato Brasileiro Série C in 1988, being eliminated in the second stage. In 1989, Brusque competed in the Campeonato Brasileiro Série B, when the club was eliminated in the first stage. In 1992, Brusque won the Campeonato Catarinense, and the Copa Santa Catarina for the first time.

In 2008, Brusque won the Copa Santa Catarina for the second time, after beating Joinville in the final. The club also competed in the same season's Recopa Sul-Brasileira, which they won after beating Londrina after a penalty shootout in the semifinals, and defeating Atlético Sorocaba 2–0 in the final.

In 2010, Brusque won the Copa Santa Catarina for the third time, but suffered relegation from the Catarinense two years later. After returning to the top tier in the following year, they suffered another relegation in 2014, but returned to the first division in 2015 by winning the Campeonato Catarinense Série B.

In 2019, Brusque won the Campeonato Brasileiro Série D, the first national title of their history. In the following year, they also achieved promotion in the Série C, returning to the second division after 36 years.

== Stadium ==
The club usually plays its home games at Estádio Augusto Bauer, which is a stadium located in Brusque, and it has a maximum capacity of 5,000 people.

== Current squad ==
As of 20 August 2026

Note: Flags indicate national team as defined under FIFA eligibility rules; some limited exceptions apply. Players may hold more than one non-FIFA nationality.

No.	Pos.	Nation	Player
1	GK	BRA	Matheus Nogueira
2	DF	BRA	Jeferson
3	DF	BRA	João Maistro (on loan from Goianiense)
4	DF	BRA	Cipriano (on loan from APOEL)
5	MF	BRA	Bernardo Lemes
6	DF	BRA	Raimar
7	MF	BRA	Gazão
8	MF	BRA	Jonatan Lucca
9	FW	BRA	Marlyson
10	FW	BRA	João Pedro
11	FW	BRA	Petterson Novaes
12	GK	BRA	Paulo Gianezini
13	FW	BRA	Renan Henrique
14	DF	BRA	Ryan Santos
15	DF	BRA	Rafael Milhorim
16	DF	BRA	Davi Gabriel

No.	Pos.	Nation	Player
17	FW	BRA	Adrianinho
18	FW	BRA	Álvaro
19	FW	BRA	Macário
20	MF	BRA	Ariel Palácio
21	FW	NGR	Udeh Clinton (on loan from Cianorte)
22	MF	BRA	Pedro Medeiros
23	DF	BRA	Italo Lucas (on loan from Sport Recife)
24	MF	BRA	Alex Paulino
25	GK	BRA	José Vinicius
26	DF	BRA	Leonardo Ataíde (on loan from Cuiabá)
-	GK	BRA	Lucas Moura
-	DF	BRA	Alisson Cassiano
-	MF	BRA	Rafa Fonseca
-	MF	BRA	Leonardo
-	MF	BRA	João Vithor

=== Youth team ===
Note: Flags indicate national team as defined under FIFA eligibility rules; some limited exceptions apply. Players may hold more than one non-FIFA nationality.

No.	Pos.	Nation	Player
42	GK	BRA	Andrey

=== Out on loan ===
Note: Flags indicate national team as defined under FIFA eligibility rules; some limited exceptions apply. Players may hold more than one non-FIFA nationality.

No.	Pos.	Nation	Player
97	DF	BRA	Mateus Pivô (at AVS until 30 June 2027)
—	MF	BRA	Biel (at Sport Recife until 31 December 2026)

== Honours ==
=== Official tournaments ===
National
Competitions	Titles	Seasons
Campeonato Brasileiro Série D	1	2019
Regional
Competitions	Titles	Seasons
Recopa Sul-Brasileira	1^{s}	2008
State
Competitions	Titles	Seasons
Campeonato Catarinense	2	1992, 2022
Copa Santa Catarina	5^{s}	1992, 2008, 2010, 2018, 2019
Recopa Catarinense	2^{s}	2020, 2023
Campeonato Catarinense Série B	3^{s}	1997, 2008, 2015

- record
- ^{S} shared record

=== Runners-up ===
- Campeonato Brasileiro Série C (1): 2023
- Recopa Sul-Brasileira (1): 2010
- Campeonato Catarinense (3): 2020, 2023, 2024
- Copa Santa Catarina (3): 1990, 2011, 2017
- Recopa Catarinense (1): 2019
- Campeonato Catarinense Série B (1): 2013
- Campeonato Catarinense Série C (1): 2004
