= Joinville Esporte Clube =

Joinville
- Full name: Joinville Esporte Clube
- Nicknames: JEC; Tricolor Catarinense (Santa Catarina's Tricolour); O Coelho (The Rabbit); Nasceu Campeão (The Born Champion)
- Founded: 29 January 1976 (50 years ago)
- Ground: Arena Joinville
- Capacity: 22,675
- President: Charles Fischer
- Head coach: Gilmar Dal Pozzo
- League: Campeonato Brasileiro Série D Campeonato Catarinense
- 2025 2025: Série D, 26th of 64; Catarinense, 4th of 12
- Website: www.jec.com.br
Home colors	Away colors

Joinville Esporte Clube, JEC or simply Joinville, is a Brazilian football team from Joinville in Santa Catarina. Founded on 29 January 1976 they have won the Série B and Série C once and they have the largest sequence of consecutive state titles, eight (1978, 1979, 1980, 1981, 1982, 1983, 1984, 1985).

Joinville is the third most successful club in Santa Catarina in terms of state championship titles (12), behind Avaí (19) and Figueirense (18).

== History ==
Joinville was founded on 29 January 1976, after América-SC football department and Caxias football department fused. The club's Golden Age was in the 1980s, when the club won eight state championships in a row.

Joinville's largest win was on 31 October 1976, when the club beat Ipiranga of Tangará 11–1 at Estádio Municipal de Tangará.

The club won the Copa Santa Catarina in 2009, and then the Recopa Sul-Brasileira in the same year, after beating Serrano Centro-Sul 3–2 in the final. They won the Copa Santa Catarina again in 2011. Joinville also won the Série C in 2011, after beating CRB 3–1 and 4–0 in the final. The club won the Copa Santa Catarina for the third time in 2012. In 2014, the club won the Campeonato Brasileiro Série B, returning to the Série A after 29 years of absence.

Joinville were relegated to the Serie B in 2015 after coming in last place in the Serie A, and then relegated once again to Serie C in 2016.

After 3 years without national division, Joinville secured their place in 2025 Serie D.

In 2026, the year of its fiftieth anniversary, Joinville went through a major crisis in the championship, with intense fan protests against the board and the squad. The club was fined in R$ 20,000 reais and lost three field orders by the Sports Court of Justice of Santa Catarina state (Tribunal de Justiça Desportiva do Estado de Santa Catarina, TJD-SC) after the fans threw bombs and flares onto the pitch in the first round of the relegation quadrangular, in the 4-2 defeat to Marcelo Dias on Arena Joinville. Joinville was relegated to Campeonato Catarinense Série B in the fourth round, after losing to Carlos Renaux 2-1 away from home and Marcelo Dias winning against Figueirense 1-0 on Estádio Orlando Scarpelli. Meanwhile, an impeachment request by a group of ten advisors was filed against the club's president Darthanhan Oliveira, alleging administrative and financial mismanagement. The request was accepted by the club's Deliberative Council, which established a disciplinary committee to judge the case according to the statutory rules.

== Honours ==
=== Official tournaments ===
National
Competitions	Titles	Seasons
Campeonato Brasileiro Série B	1	2014
Campeonato Brasileiro Série C	1	2011
Regional
Competitions	Titles	Seasons
Recopa Sul-Brasileira	1^{s}	2009
State
Competitions	Titles	Seasons
Campeonato Catarinense	12	1976, 1978, 1979, 1980, 1981, 1982, 1983, 1984, 1985, 1987, 2000, 2001
Copa Santa Catarina	5^{s}	2009, 2011, 2012, 2013, 2020
Recopa Catarinense	1	2021
Campeonato Catarinense Série B	3^{s}	2005, 2006, 2007

- record
- ^{S} shared record

=== Others tournaments ===
==== State ====
- Taça Santa Catarina (1): 1980
- Taça Governador do Estado (3): 1981, 1982, 1984

=== Runners-up ===
- Campeonato Catarinense (8): 1989, 1990, 1996, 2006, 2010, 2014, 2015, 2016
- Copa Santa Catarina (5): 1995, 2007, 2008, 2010, 2025

== Rivals ==
Joinville's greatest rivals are Avaí, Figueirense and Criciúma.

The matches between Criciúma and Joinville Esporte Clube are called Interior Classic, by the media and fans of these clubs and others.

== Mascot and nickname ==
- The club's mascot is a rabbit. Joinville is nicknamed JEC, which is an acronym of the club's full name.

== Current squad ==
As of 20 August 2026

Note: Flags indicate national team as defined under FIFA eligibility rules; some limited exceptions apply. Players may hold more than one non-FIFA nationality.

No.	Pos.	Nation	Player
—	GK	BRA	Jhonatan
—	GK	BRA	Matheus
—	GK	BRA	Felipe
—	GK	BRA	Samuel Pires
—	DF	BRA	Danrlei
—	DF	BRA	Fabiano Eller (on loan from Náutico)
—	DF	BRA	Jaime (on loan from Figueirense)
—	DF	BRA	Ligger (on loan from Oeste)
—	DF	BRA	Everton Silva
—	DF	BRA	Reginaldo
—	DF	BRA	Robertinho (on loan from Tombense)
—	DF	BRA	Diego
—	DF	BRA	Fernandinho
—	MF	BRA	Matheus Bertotto (on loan from Internacional)
—	MF	BRA	Diones

No.	Pos.	Nation	Player
—	MF	BRA	Kadu
—	MF	BRA	Naldo
—	MF	BRA	Paulinho Dias (on loan from Atlético Paranaense)
—	MF	BRA	Tinga
—	MF	BRA	Bruno Farias
—	MF	BRA	Bruno Ribeiro (on loan from Juventude)
—	MF	BRA	Carlos Alberto (on loan from Atlético Paranaense)
—	MF	BRA	Juninho
—	MF	BRA	Mateus Silva
—	MF	BRA	Thomás (on loan from Flamengo)
—	FW	BRA	Adriano
—	FW	BRA	Fernando Viana
—	FW	BRA	Giva (on loan from Ponte Preta)
—	FW	BRA	Heliardo (on loan from Cianorte)
—	FW	BRA	Jael

=== Out on loan ===
Note: Flags indicate national team as defined under FIFA eligibility rules; some limited exceptions apply. Players may hold more than one non-FIFA nationality.

No.	Pos.	Nation	Player
—	DF	BRA	André Baumer (to (Brazil) Flamengo)
—	DF	BRA	Igor (to (Brazil) Flamengo)
—	DF	BRA	Bruno Aguiar (to (Qatar) Muaither SC)
—	DF	BRA	Brenner (to (Brazil) Juventus Jaraguá)
—	MF	BRA	Roberto (to (Brazil) Fluminense)
—	MF	BRA	Luiz Meneses (to (Brazil) Osasco Audax)

No.	Pos.	Nation	Player
—	MF	BRA	Breno (to (Brazil) Juventus Jaraguá)
—	MF	BRA	Jonathan Ramos (to (Brazil) Juventus Jaraguá)
—	MF	BRA	Gustavo Sauer (to (South Korea) Daejeon Citizen)
—	FW	BRA	Ítalo Melo (to (Brazil) América de Natal)
—	FW	BRA	Welinton Júnior (to (Brazil) CRB)

== National competitions record ==
First Division (Série A)

Year	Position	Year	Position
1977	33rd	1983	37th
1978	41st	1984	25th
1979	29th	1985	8th
1980	21st	1986	14th
1981	38th	2015	20th
1982	38th		

Second Division (Série B)

Year	Position	Year	Position	Year	Position
1987	14th	1997	6th	2004	22nd
1988	5th	1998	7th	2012	6th
1989	10th	1999	15th	2013	6th
1990	18th	2000	20th	2014	1st
1991	23rd	2001	9th	2016	17th
1992	27th	2002	12th		
1996	15th	2003	14th		

Third Division (Série C)

Year	Position
2005	11th
2006	17th
2007	18th
2011	1st
2017	9th
2018	20th

Fourth Division (Série D)

Year	Position
2010	4th
2019	45th
2020	37th
2021	9th

Brazilian Cup

Year	Position	Year	Position
1990	First round	2017	Fourth round
2001	First round	2018	Second round
2002	First round	2019	First round
2013	Second round	2021	Second round
2014	First round		
2015	First round		
2016	Second round		

== Seasons ==
Results of league and cup competitions by season
Season	Division	P	W	D	L	F	A	Pts	Pos	Brazilian Cup	Competition	Result
Season	League									Brazilian Cup	South America	
1976	—	—	—	—	—	—	—	—	—	—	—	—
1977	Série A	13	5	3	5	15	18	15	33rd	—	—	—
1978	Série A	20	4	10	6	17	24	18	41st	—	—	—
1979	Série A	16	7	4	5	20	17	18	29th	—	—	—
1980	Série A	15	4	6	5	20	16	14	21st	—	—	—
1981	Série A	9	2	2	5	5	11	6	38th	—	—	—
1982	Série A	8	2	1	5	11	16	5	38th	—	—	—
1983	Série A	8	2	2	4	7	12	6	37th	—	—	—
1984	Série A	14	4	4	6	10	18	12	25th	—	—	—
1985	Série A	28	13	6	9	36	23	32	8th	—	—	—
1986	Série A	28	8	13	7	30	31	29	14th	—	—	—
1987	Yellow Module	14	2	5	7	8	16	9	14th	—	—	—
1988	Série B	22	9	9	4	27	20	41	5th	—	—	—
1989	Série B	14	7	4	3	12	17	18	10th	—	—	—
1990	Série B	10	2	5	3	8	8	9	18th	R1	—	—
1991	Série B	14	5	6	3	16	15	16	23rd	—	—	—
1992	Série B	14	4	4	6	6	11	12	27th	—	—	—
1993	—	—	—	—	—	—	—	—	—	—	—	—
1994	—	—	—	—	—	—	—	—	—	—	—	—
1995	—	—	—	—	—	—	—	—	—	—	—	—
1996	Série B	10	3	2	5	15	14	11	15th	—	—	—
1997	Série B	16	7	4	5	22	20	25	6th	—	—	—
1998	Série B	19	8	6	5	23	21	30	7th	—	—	—
1999	Série B	21	8	2	11	22	25	26	15th	—	—	—
2000	Yellow Module	17	5	7	5	19	17	22	20th	—	—	—
2001	Série B	26	11	8	7	39	26	41	9th	R1	—	—
2002	Série B	25	10	4	11	36	44	34	12th	R1	—	—
2003	Série B	23	7	6	10	33	41	30	15th	—	—	—
2004	Série B ↓	23	6	0	17	24	42	18	22nd	—	—	—
2005	Série C	10	5	2	3	13	8	17	11th R3	—	—	—
2006	Série C	12	6	2	5	20	14	20	17th R2	—	—	—
2007	Série C	12	6	3	3	16	9	21	18th R2	—	—	—
2008	—	—	—	—	—	—	—	—	—	—	—	—
2009	—	—	—	—	—	—	—	—	—	—	—	—
2010	Série D ↑	12	6	4	2	14	7	22	4th	—	—	—
2011	Série C ↑	16	11	4	1	38	16	37	1st	—	—	—
2012	Série B	38	17	9	12	58	40	60	6th	—	—	—
2013	Série B	38	17	8	13	58	44	59	6th	R2	—	—
2014	Série B ↑	38	21	7	10	54	33	70	1st	R1	—	—
2015	Série A ↓	38	7	10	21	26	48	31	20th	R1	Copa Sudamericana	R2
2016	Série B ↓	38	9	13	16	32	42	40	17th	R2	—	—
2017	Série C	18	6	7	5	28	23	25	9th	R4	—	—
2018	Série C ↓	18	4	2	12	13	35	14	20th	R2	—	—
2019	Série D	6	2	1	3	3	4	7	45th	R1	—	—
2020	Série D	14	5	5	4	17	11	20	37th	—	—	—
2021	Série D	18	8	9	1	21	10	33	9th	R2	—	—
2022	—	—	—	—	—	—	—	—	—	—	—	—
2023	—	—	—	—	—	—	—	—	—	—	—	—

== International record ==
- Copa Sudamericana: 1 appearance

Best: 2015 (2nd stage)

== Managers ==
- (Brazil) João Francisco (1985)
- (Brazil) Hélio dos Anjos (1985–89)
- (Brazil) Edu Coimbra (1987)
- (Brazil) Arturzinho (2011)
- (Brazil) Leandro Campos (2012)
- (Brazil) Marcelo Serrano (2012)
- (Brazil) Artur Neto (2012–13)
- (Brazil) Arturzinho (2013)
- (Brazil) Ricardo Drubscky (2013)
- (Uruguay) Sérgio Ramirez (2013)
- (Brazil) Hemerson Maria (2014–15)
- (Brazil) Adílson Batista (2015)
- (Brazil) PC Gusmão (2015–16)
- (Brazil) Hemerson Maria (2016)
- (Brazil) Lisca (2016)
- (Brazil) Ramon Menezes (2016)
- (Brazil) Fabinho Santos (2017)
- (Brazil) Pingo (2017)
- (Brazil) Rogério Zimmermann (2017-)

== Futsal ==
Joinville has a futsal team in partnership with the company Krona Tubos e Conexões that plays top tier futsal in the Liga Nacional de Futsal.

== See also ==
- Joinville Futsal
