= Rio do Sul =

Rio do Sul - Santa Catarina - Brazil
- Municipality
- Rio do Sul - Santa Catarina - Brazil

- Flag Coat of arms

- Location in Brazil
- Country: Brazil
- Region: South
- State: Santa Catarina
- Mesoregion: Vale do Itajai

Government
  - Mayor: José Thomé

Area
  - Total: 100.702 sq mi (260.817 km^{2})
- Elevation: 1,115.1 ft (339.88 m)

Population (2020)
  - Total: 72,006
  - Density: 715.04/sq mi (276.08/km^{2})
- Time zone: UTC -3
- Postal code: 89160-000
- Area code: 47
- Website: www.riodosul.sc.gov.br

Rio do Sul is a municipality in the state of Santa Catarina in the South region of Brazil.

One of the postcards of the city is the Cathedral of St. John the Baptist. Other important buildings are Ponte dos Arcos, a former railway station and German-style buildings. Also in town is the Itajaí-Açu river (a confluence of Itajaí do Sul and Itajaí do Oeste).

== History ==
Rio do Sul was elevated to municipality status as of state Law # 1,708 of October 10, 1930, with territory taken from Blumenau.

== Geography ==
=== Climate ===
The Region is classified as having a temperate, humid climate. The annual median temperature is 18 °C (maximum of 34 °C, in the summer and minimum -2 °C in the winter). In the winter of 2013, snow was recorded in the municipality, which is very uncommon.

=== Floods ===
Rio do Sul has a history of frequently occurring floods, as in the city there are three rivers- Itajaí-Açu, Itajaí do Norte and Itajaí do Oeste. The most destructive floods ever recorded were 1983 and 1984; there was also a more recent case in September 2011, where the water level went over 13 m.

== Education ==
The city of Rio do Sul is the most responsible for the education of children, the largest number of schools facing children and teenagers is administrative and public access. But a lower number of private schools meet the demands of the school age population. Among the main elementary and secondary schools are Colégio Dom Bosco, Colégio Sinodal Ruy Barbosa, Instituto Maria Auxiliadora, COC and UNIDAVI. In public education, there are two main state colleges: Henrique da Silva Fontes and Paulo Zimmermann.

There are also educational centers geared directly towards the labor market as SENAI and SENAC, which offer professional courses for high-schoolers.

The universities operating in the region are UNIDAVI, which was founded in Rio do Sul in 1966 and FAMESUL Uniasselvi, IFC - Federal Institute of Santa Catarina, the only public university in the city.

== See also ==
- List of municipalities in Santa Catarina
