= Grêmio Esportivo Juventus =

Association football club in Brazil

Juventus
- Full name: Grêmio Esportivo Juventus
- Nicknames: Moleque Travesso; Tricolor Jaraguaense; Tricolor do Jaraguá Esquerdo
- Founded: 1 May 1966; 60 years ago
- Ground: Estádio João Marcatto
- Capacity: 10,000
- President: Jerry Back Luft
- Head coach: Luiz Roberto Magalhães (Pingo)
- League: Campeonato Catarinense Série B
- 2025: Catarinense Série B, 5th of 9
- Website: www.juventusjaragua.com.br
Home colors	Away colors

Grêmio Esportivo Juventus, commonly known as Juventus or Juventus-SC, is a Brazilian football club based in Jaraguá do Sul, Santa Catarina state. They competed twice in the Série C.

== History ==
The club was founded on 1 May 1966. Juventus competed in the Série C in 1995 and in 1996.

== Honours ==
=== Official tournaments ===
State
Competitions	Titles	Seasons
Campeonato Catarinense Série C	1	2004

=== Others tournaments ===
==== City ====
- Campeonato Citadino de Jaraguá do Sul (3): 1974, 1975, 1982

=== Runners-up ===
- Copa Santa Catarina (1): 2021
- Campeonato Catarinense Série B (4): 1990, 2008, 2009, 2012

== Stadium ==
Grêmio Esportivo Juventus play their home games at Estádio João Marcatto. The stadium has a maximum capacity of 10,000 people.
