= Brusque, Santa Catarina =

Coordinates: 27°05′41.73″S 48°54′53.31″W

Brusque
- Municipality
- Municipality of Brusque
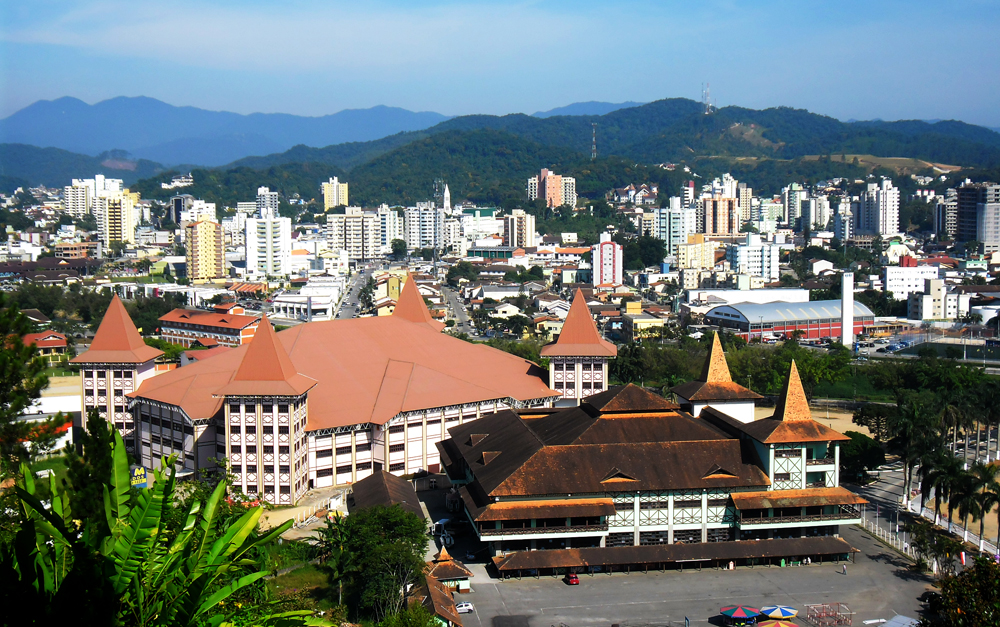
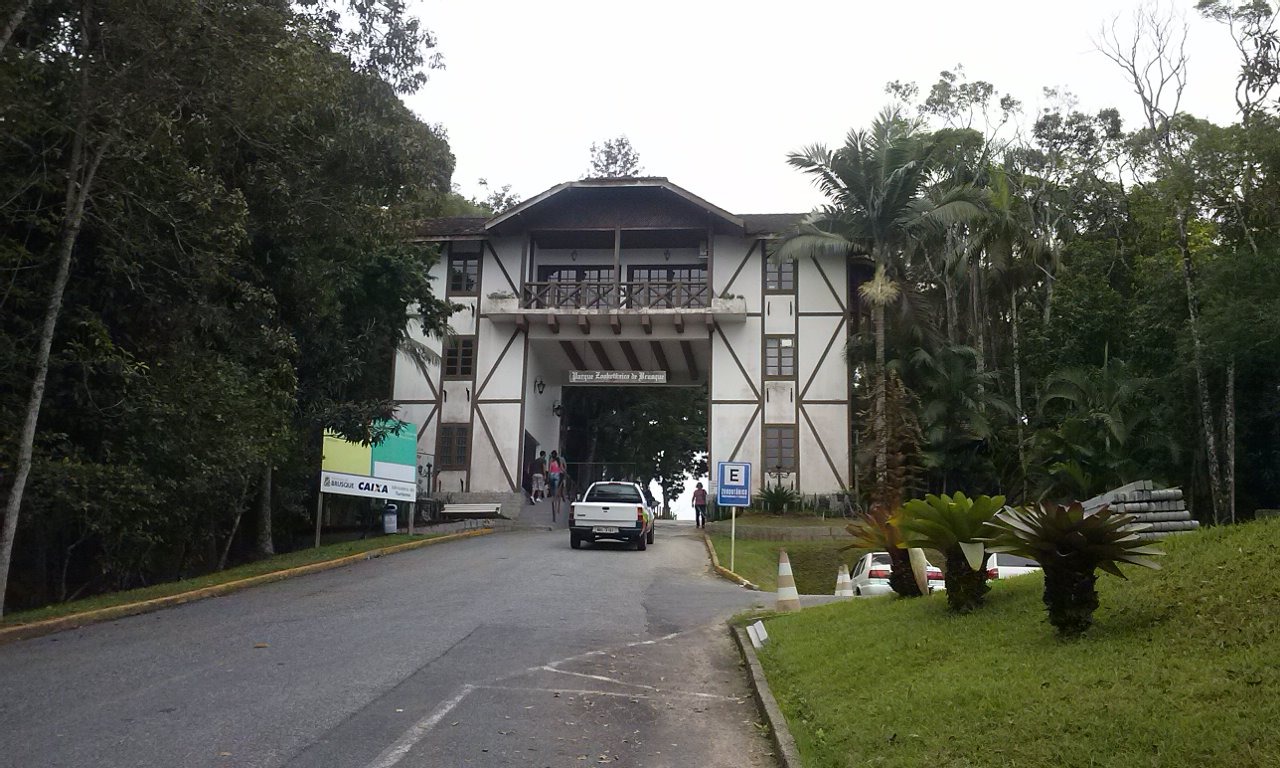
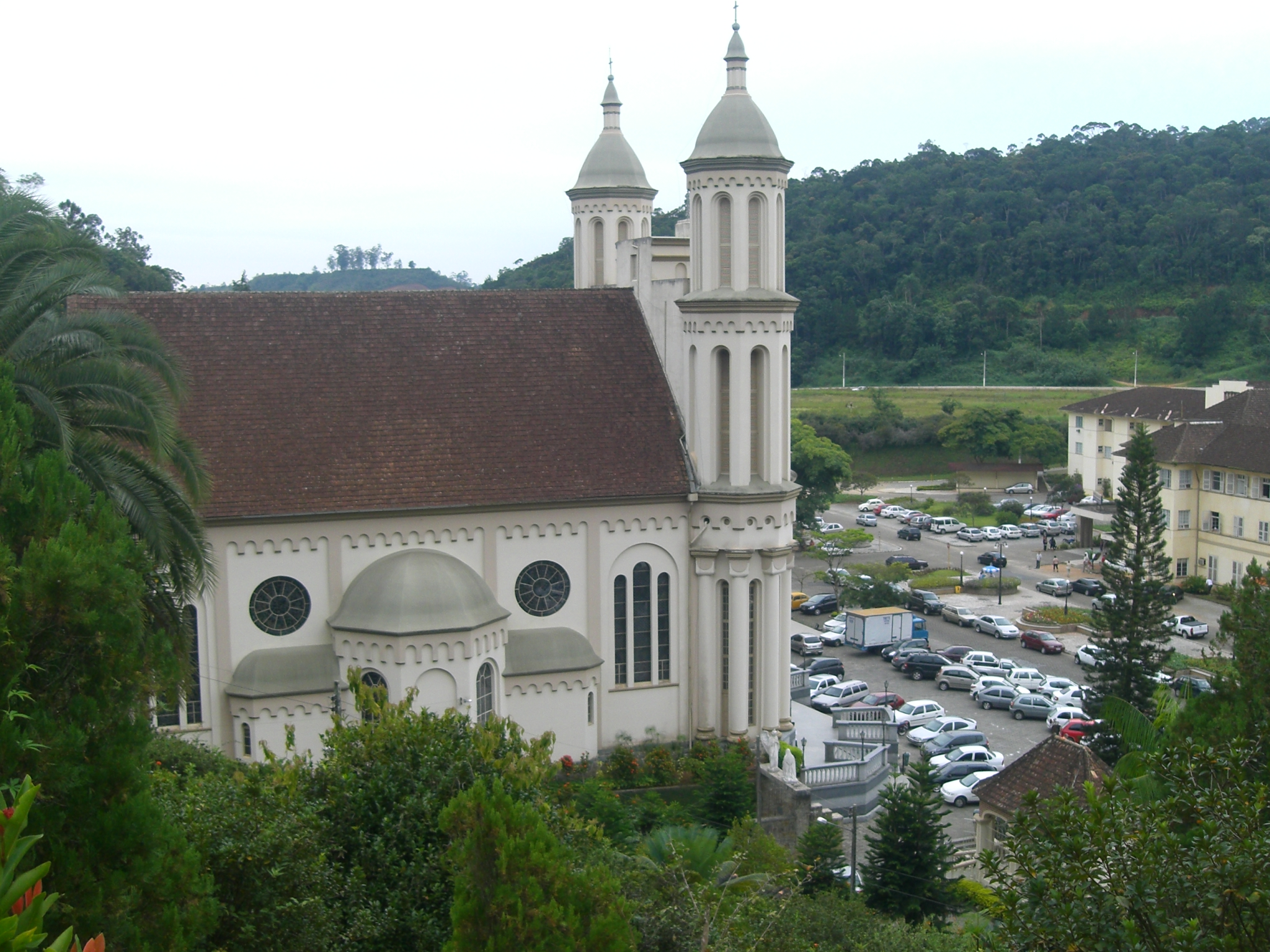
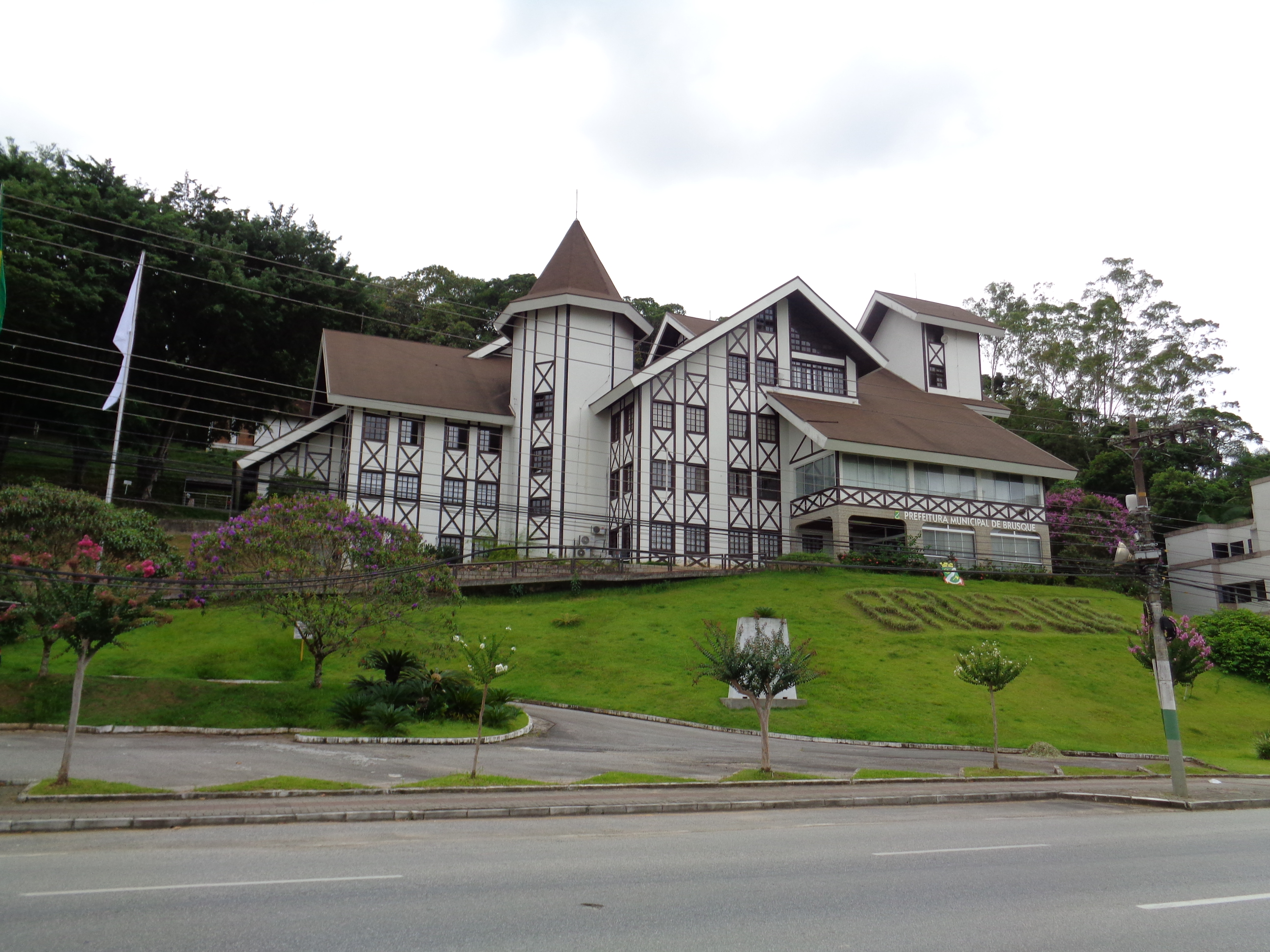
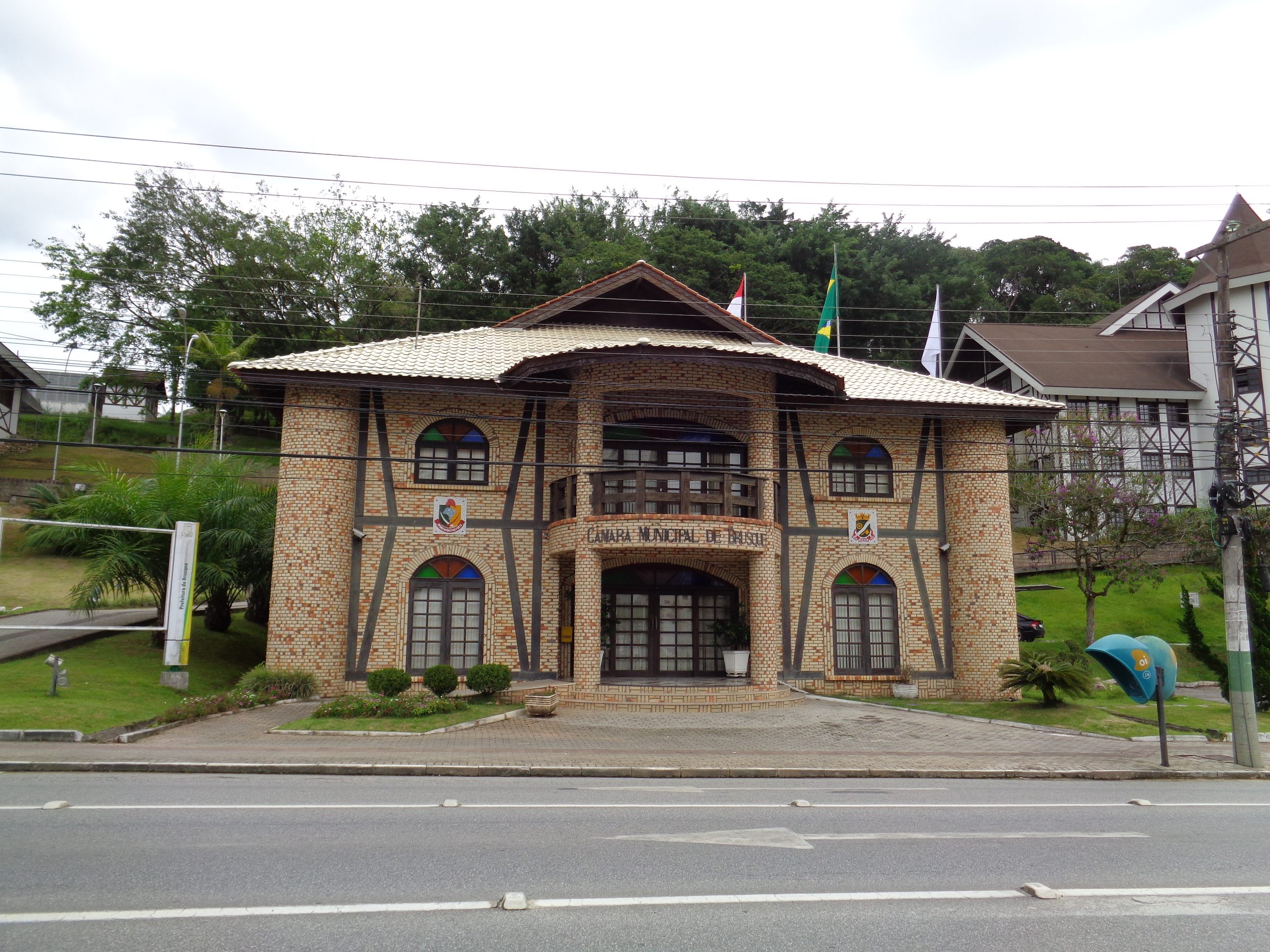
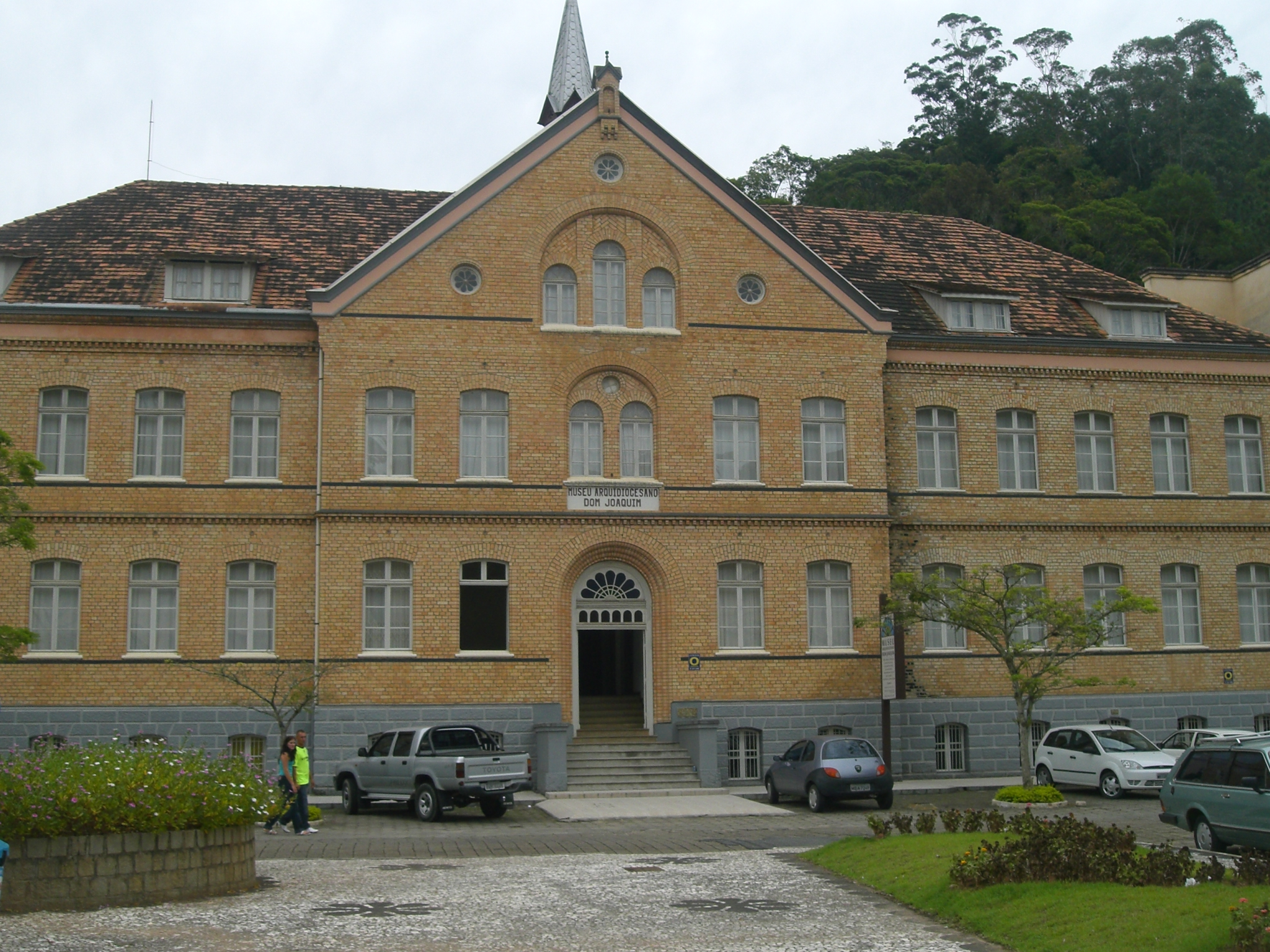
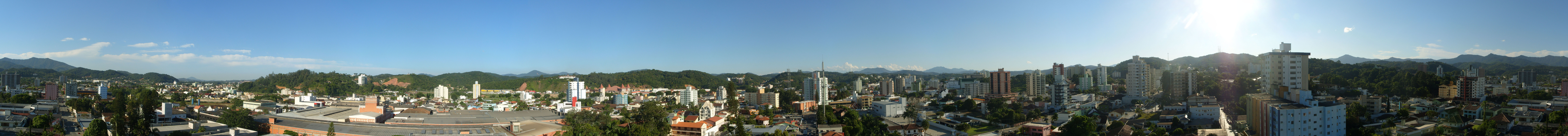

- Flag Coat of arms
- Nickname: Tissue City
- Location in Santa Catarina

- Location in Brazil
- Country: Brazil
- Region: South
- State: Santa Catarina
- Founded: August 4, 1860
- Founder: Maximilian von Schneeburg
- Named for: Francisco Carlos de Araújo Brusque

Government
  - Type: Mayor-council government
  - Mayor: André Vechi (PL)

Area
  - Total: 284.675 km^{2} (109.914 sq mi)
- Elevation: 21 m (69 ft)

Population (2022 Census)
  - Total: 141,385
  - Estimate (2025): 155,307
  - Density: 496.654/km^{2} (1,286.33/sq mi)
- Time zone: UTC-3 (BRT)
- Postal Code: 88350-000
- Area code: + 55 (47)
- HDI (2010): 0.795 – high
- Website: brusque.sc.gov.br

Brusque is a city in the state of Santa Catarina, Brazil. It was founded on August 4, 1860, by 55 German immigrants.

The city was originally called Colônia Itajahy, but on 17 January 1890 it was renamed Brusque after former Santa Catarina province president Francisco Carlos de Araújo Brusque.

== Sports ==
Brusque is home to Clube Atlético Carlos Renaux, the first professional football team in the state, founded on September 14, 1913. Currently, their official football team is Brusque Futebol Clube, founded on October 12, 1987.

Brusque has a strong women's volleyball team, Abel Moda Vôlei, in the Superliga Brasileira de Voleibol.

== Curiosities ==
- The city is a pioneer in the invention of the voting machine, and the first polling station to use it was also in Brusque (1988).

- First Latin American city to have public computers (1995).

- Headquarters of the first spinning industry of Santa Catarina (1892 - Textile Factory Renaux).

- Headquarters of the only English colony of Santa Catarina (1867).

- The only city in Brazil to use chlorine dioxide to treat water consumed by the population.

Current ethnic composition: 90% Whites; 5% Pardos; 4% Blacks; 0.5% Native American; 0.5% Asian. Original Population: 50% German; 30% Italian; 10% Portuguese; 9% African; 1% Asian.

== Religions ==
80% Catholics; 15% Lutherans; 4% Evangelicals; 1% Jehovah's Witness.

== Notable people ==
- Júlia Bergmann, volleyball player for the Brazilian national team
- Murilo Fischer - Professional road bicycle racer
- Ederson Tormena - Footballer
- Brandão - Footballer
- Luciano Hang - Businessman

== Climate ==
Climate data for Brusque, Santa Catarina (1976–2005)
Month	Jan	Feb	Mar	Apr	May	Jun	Jul	Aug	Sep	Oct	Nov	Dec	Year
Record high °C (°F)	40.4 (104.7)	41.0 (105.8)	40.2 (104.4)	35.6 (96.1)	33.2 (91.8)	32.2 (90.0)	32.0 (89.6)	35.0 (95.0)	38.2 (100.8)	36.6 (97.9)	39.2 (102.6)	40.9 (105.6)	41.0 (105.8)
Mean daily maximum °C (°F)	31.0 (87.8)	31.1 (88.0)	30.0 (86.0)	27.6 (81.7)	24.7 (76.5)	22.6 (72.7)	22.4 (72.3)	23.1 (73.6)	23.7 (74.7)	25.8 (78.4)	27.8 (82.0)	29.8 (85.6)	26.6 (79.9)
Daily mean °C (°F)	24.4 (75.9)	24.1 (75.4)	23.2 (73.8)	20.5 (68.9)	17.8 (64.0)	15.7 (60.3)	15.0 (59.0)	16.0 (60.8)	17.6 (63.7)	19.3 (66.7)	21.2 (70.2)	23.0 (73.4)	19.8 (67.7)
Mean daily minimum °C (°F)	19.6 (67.3)	19.7 (67.5)	18.8 (65.8)	16.3 (61.3)	13.2 (55.8)	11.7 (53.1)	10.7 (51.3)	12.0 (53.6)	13.8 (56.8)	15.3 (59.5)	16.8 (62.2)	18.4 (65.1)	15.5 (59.9)
Record low °C (°F)	10.0 (50.0)	9.4 (48.9)	7.8 (46.0)	4.6 (40.3)	1.0 (33.8)	−0.8 (30.6)	−3.2 (26.2)	−4.6 (23.7)	−1.0 (30.2)	4.0 (39.2)	6.6 (43.9)	9.4 (48.9)	−4.6 (23.7)
Average precipitation mm (inches)	225.4 (8.87)	194.6 (7.66)	156.9 (6.18)	88.0 (3.46)	91.3 (3.59)	97.6 (3.84)	117.1 (4.61)	95.9 (3.78)	126.8 (4.99)	166.8 (6.57)	161.3 (6.35)	188.8 (7.43)	1,710.5 (67.33)
Source: Empresa Brasileira de Pesquisa Agropecuária (EMBRAPA)
