= 2026 Club Athletico Paranaense season =

Athletico Paranaense
2026 season
- President: Mario Celso Petraglia
- Manager: Odair Hellmann
- Stadium: Arena da Baixada
- Campeonato Brasileiro Série A: 5th
- Campeonato Paranaense: Semi-finals
- Copa do Brasil: Round of 16
- Copa Paraná: Finals
- Top goalscorer: League: Kevin Viveros (21); All: Kevin Viveros (22)
Home colours	Away colours	Third colours

In the 2026 season, the 103rd season in its history, Club Athletico Paranaense participates in the Brazilian Série A after a one-season absence, and also competes in the Campeonato Paranaense and the Copa do Brasil.

== Transfers ==
=== In ===
Pos.	Player	Transferred from	Fee	Date	Source
DF	(Brazil) Gilberto Junior	(Brazil) Palmeiras	Loan	27 December 2025	
FW	(Argentina) Lucas Di Yorio	Universidad de Chile	Loan return	31 December 2025	
DF	(Brazil) Dudu	(Brazil) Atlético Goianiense	Loan return	31 December 2025	
DF	(Paraguay) Mateo Gamarra	(Brazil) Cruzeiro	Loan return	31 December 2025	
FW	(Uruguay) Gonzalo Mastriani	(Brazil) Botafogo	Loan return	31 December 2025	
DF	(Colombia) Hayen Palacios	(Uruguay) Nacional	Loan return	31 December 2025	
DF	(Argentina) Gastón Benavídez	(Argentina) Talleres	Loan made permanent	1 January 2026	
MF	(Colombia) Alejandro García	(Colombia) Once Caldas	Free	1 January 2026	
MF	(Brazil) Jadson	(Brazil) Juventude	Free	3 January 2026	
MF	(Colombia) Juan Portilla	(Argentina) Talleres	Undisclosed	3 January 2026	
FW	(Colombia) Daniel Aguilar	(Colombia) Orsomarso U20	Undisclosed	22 January 2026	
MF	(Brazil) Luiz Gustavo	(Brazil) São Paulo FC	Free	23 January 2026	
DF	(Brazil) Claudinho	(Brazil) Desportivo Brasil U20	Undisclosed	28 January 2026	
FW	(Colombia) Jorge Rivaldo	(Colombia) Águilas Doradas	Undisclosed	1 July 2026	
DF	(Brazil) Gilberto	(Brazil) Bahia	Free	1 July 2026	
DF	(Brazil) Dantas	(Brazil) Novorizontino	Loan	9 July 2026	
MF	(Colombia) Kerwin Vargas	(United States) Charlotte FC	Undisclosed	31 July 2026	

=== Out ===
Pos.	Player	Transferred to	Fee	Date	Source
MF	(Colombia) Elan Ricardo	(Turkey) Beşiktaş	Loan return	31 December 2025	
MF	(Brazil) Patrick	(Brazil) Santos	Loan return	31 December 2025	
MF	(Colombia) Kevin Velasco	(Mexico) Puebla	Loan return	31 December 2025	
FW	(Argentina) Lucas Di Yorio	(Mexico) Santos Laguna	Undisclosed	1 January 2026	
DF	(Paraguay) Mateo Gamarra	(Paraguay) Olimpia	Loan	1 January 2026	
FW	(Brazil) Alan Kardec	(Brazil) Juventude		1 January 2026	
DF	(Colombia) Hayen Palacios	(Colombia) Independiente Medellín	Loan	9 February 2026	
FW	(Uruguay) Gonzalo Mastriani	(Brazil) América Mineiro	Loan	11 March 2026	
DF	(Brazil) Habraão	(Brazil) Sport Recife	Loan	26 March 2026	
FW	(Brazil) Julimar	(United Arab Emirates) Sharjah FC	Undisclosed	13 July 2026	
DF	(Brazil) Dudu	(Brazil) Guarani	Undisclosed	24 July 2026	

== Friendlies ==
8 July 2026 Friendly	Boca Juniors (Argentina)	1–0	(Brazil) Athletico Paranaense	Salta, Argentina
21:00 UTC−3				Stadium: Estadio Padre Ernesto Martearena

11 July 2026 Friendly	Red Bull Bragantino (São Paulo (state))	2–1	(Paraná (state)) Athletico Paranaense	Atibaia
10:00 UTC−3		Report

== Competitions ==
=== Overall record ===
Competition	First match	Last match	Starting round	Final position	Record							
Competition	First match	Last match	Starting round	Final position	Pld	W	D	L	GF	GA	GD	Win %
Brasileiro Série A	28 January 2026		Matchday 1		36	16	9	11	56	47	+9	44.44
Campeonato Paranaense	8 January 2026	22 February 2026	Matchday 1	Semi-finals	10	5	2	3	20	10	+10	50.00
Copa do Brasil	23 April 2026	6 August 2026	Fifth round	Round of 16	4	1	2	1	2	4	−2	25.00
Copa Paraná	23 April 2026	21 November 2026	First round		11	6	2	3	13	10	+3	54.55
Total					61	28	15	18	91	71	+20	45.90

Last updated: 22 November 2026
Source: Competitions

=== Campeonato Brasileiro Série A ===
Pos	Team	Pld	W	D	L	GF	GA	GD	Pts	Qualification or relegation
3	Cruzeiro (Q)	36	20	6	10	59	50	+9	66	Qualification for Copa Libertadores group stage
4	Fluminense (T)	35	17	9	9	56	42	+14	60	Qualification for Copa Libertadores group stage
5	Athletico Paranaense (X)	35	15	9	11	52	45	+7	54	Qualification for Copa Libertadores second stage (Note: Since Palmeiras, who qualified for the Copa Libertadores group stage on league performance, reached the 2026 Copa do Brasil final, the Copa Libertadores second stage berth allocated to the 2026 Copa do Brasil runners-up was passed to the Série A's highest-placed team not already qualified.)
6	Bahia (X)	36	14	12	10	50	46	+4	54	Qualification for Copa Libertadores second stage
7	Atlético Mineiro (X)	35	14	9	12	44	40	+4	51	Qualification for Copa Sudamericana group stage

Updated to match(es) played on 21 November 2026. Source: CBF
Rules for classification: 1) points; 2) wins; 3) goal difference; 4) goals scored; 5) head-to-head results (only between two teams); 6) fewest red cards; 7) fewest yellow cards; 8) drawing of lots.
(Q) Qualified for the phase indicated; (T) Qualified, but not yet for the particular phase indicated; (X) Assured of Copa Sudamericana, but may still qualify for Copa Libertadores

==== Results by round ====
Round	1	2	3	4	5	6	7	8	9	10	11	12	13	14	15	16	17	18	19	20	21	22	23	24	25	26	27	28	29	30	31	32	33	34	35	36
Ground	A	H	H	A	H	A	H	H	A	A	H	A	H	H	A	H	A	H	A	H	A	A	H	A	H	A	A	H	H	A	H	A	A	H	A	H
Result	W	L	W	D	W	L	W	W	L	L	W	L	W	D	L	D	W	W	W	W	D	W	D	W	D	L	D	W	D	W	L	D	L	L	L	W
Position	8	12	6	7	4	6	5	4	6	6	6	6	6	6	6	6	4	4	3	3	3	3	3	3	3	3	3	3	4	3	3	4	5	5		
Points	3	3	6	7	10	10	13	16	16	16	19	19	22	23	23	24	27	30	33	36	37	40	41	44	45	45	46	49	50	53	53	54	54	54	54	57

Updated to match(es) played on 22 November 2026. Source:
A = Away; H = Home; W = Win; D = Draw; L = Loss

==== Matches ====
28 January 2026 1	Internacional	0–1	Athletico Paranaense	Porto Alegre

12 February 2026 3	Athletico Paranaense	2–1	Santos	Curitiba
				Stadium: Arena da Baixada

19 February 2026 2	Athletico Paranaense	0–1	Corinthians	Curitiba
				Stadium: Arena da Baixada

25 February 2026 4	Red Bull Bragantino	1–1	Athletico Paranaense	Bragança Paulista

15 March 2026 6	Fluminense	3–2	Athletico Paranaense	Rio de Janeiro

18 March 2026 7	Athletico Paranaense	2–1	Cruzeiro	Curitiba
				Stadium: Arena da Baixada

22 March 2026 8	Athletico Paranaense	2–0	Coritiba	Curitiba
				Stadium: Arena da Baixada

29 March 2026 5	Athletico Paranaense	4–1	Botafogo	Curitiba
19:30				Stadium: Arena da Baixada

1 April 2026 9	Bahia	3–0	Athletico Paranaense	Salvador
20:00

5 April 2026 10	Atlético Mineiro	2–1	Athletico Paranaense	Belo Horizonte
17:30

12 April 2026 11	Athletico Paranaense	2–0	Chapecoense	Curitiba
11:00				Stadium: Arena da Baixada

19 April 2026 12	Palmeiras	1–0	Athletico Paranaense	São Paulo
18:30				Stadium: Allianz Parque; Referee: Felipe Fernandes de Lima

26 April 2026 13	Athletico Paranaense	3–1	Vitória	Curitiba
18:30	Luiz Gustavo (yellow card) 9', (goal) 90+8'; Kevin Viveros 35' (pen.), 90+2'; Benavídez (yellow card) 56'; Dias 69'; Santos (yellow card) 90'; Zapelli (yellow card) 90+5'		Edenilson (yellow card) 13'; Renê 23'; Martínez (yellow card) 44'; Zé Vitor (yellow card) 88'; Lucas (yellow card) 90+6'	Stadium: Arena da Baixada; Referee: Bruno Arleu de Araújo

2 May 2026 14	Athletico Paranaense	0–0	Grêmio	Curitiba
20:30				Stadium: Arena da Baixada; Referee: Sávio Pereira Sampaio

10 May 2026 15	Vasco da Gama	1–0	Athletico Paranaense	Rio de Janeiro
20:30	Thiago Mendes 37'			Stadium: São Januário; Referee: Raphael Claus

17 May 2026 16	Athletico Paranaense	1–1	Flamengo	Curitiba
19:30	Mendoza 11'		Danilo (yellow card) 70' (yellow-red card) 90+2'; Pedro 84'	Stadium: Arena da Baixada; Referee: Rafael Rodrigo Klein

24 May 2026 17	Remo	1–2	Athletico Paranaense	Belém
16:00	Jajá Silva 14', (red card) 45+8'; Marcelinho (yellow card) 45+12'		Viveros 45', 53'; Zapelli (yellow card) 45+11'; Felipinho (yellow card) 64'; Leozinho (yellow card) 90'; Riquelme (yellow card) 90+2'	Stadium: Mangueirão; Referee: Rodrigo José Pereira de Lima

30 May 2026 18	Athletico Paranaense	1–0	Mirassol	Curitiba
16:00	Viveros 88'			Stadium: Arena da Baixada; Referee: Fernando Antonio Mendes de Salles Nascimento Filho

22 July 2026 19	São Paulo	1–2	Athletico Paranaense	São Paulo
21:30

25 July 2026 20	Athletico Paranaense	2–0	Internacional	Curitiba
18:30				Stadium: Arena da Baixada

30 July 2026 21	Corinthians	0–0	Athletico Paranaense	São Paulo
19:30

9 August 2026 22	Santos	0–2	Athletico Paranaense	Santos
18:30				Stadium: Vila Belmiro

15 August 2026 23	Athletico Paranaense	1–1	Red Bull Bragantino	Curitiba
18:30				Stadium: Arena da Baixada

24 August 2026 24	Botafogo	2–3	Athletico Paranaense	Rio de Janeiro
20:00

30 August 2026 25	Athletico Paranaense	3–3	Fluminense	Curitiba
11:00				Stadium: Arena da Baixada

6 September 2026 26	Cruzeiro	3–1	Athletico Paranaense	Belo Horizonte
16:00

11 September 2026 27	Coritiba	3–3	Athletico Paranaense	Curitiba
21:00	Joaquín Lavega (yellow card) 28'; Jacy (yellow card) 34'; Breno Lopes (red card) 45'; Tiago Cóser 45+3'; JP Chermont (yellow card) 45+9'; Pedro Rocha (yellow card) 45+12'; Rodrigo Moledo 90+2', 90+7'		Luiz Gustavo 14', (yellow card) 90+3'; Arthur Dias 30'; Viveros (yellow card) 34', (goal) 63' (pen.); João Cruz (yellow card) 43'; Dantas (yellow card) 45+5'	Stadium: Estádio Couto Pereira; Referee: Wagner do Nascimento Magalhães

20 September 2026 28	Athletico Paranaense	2–1	Bahia	Curitiba
19:30 UTC−3				Stadium: Arena da Baixada

8 October 2026 29	Athletico Paranaense	2–2	Atlético Mineiro	Curitiba
20:00 UTC−3				Stadium: Arena da Baixada

12 October 2026 30	Chapecoense	1–4	Athletico Paranaense	Chapecó
19:30 UTC−3

17 October 2026 31	Athletico Paranaense	0–2	Palmeiras	Curitiba
19:30 UTC−3				Stadium: Arena da Baixada

24 October 2026 32	Vitória	1–1	Athletico Paranaense	Salvador
16:30 UTC−3

29 October 2026 33	Grêmio	2–0	Athletico Paranaense	Porto Alegre
19:30 UTC−3

4 November 2026 34	Athletico Paranaense	1–3	Vasco da Gama	Curitiba
19:30 UTC−3				Stadium: Arena da Baixada

18 November 2026 35	Flamengo	2–1	Athletico Paranaense	Rio de Janeiro
20:30 UTC−3	Carrascal 17'; Jorginho 27' (pen.); Pulgar (yellow card) 28'; Léo Pereira (yellow card) 59'		Vargas 11'; Benavídez (yellow card) 25'; Mendoza (yellow card) 76'; Rivaldo (yellow card) 88'	Stadium: Maracanã; Attendance: 68,545; Referee: Rafael Rodrigo Klein

22 November 2026 36	Athletico Paranaense	4–2	Remo	Curitiba
16:00 UTC−3				Stadium: Arena da Baixada; Referee: Wilton Sampaio

=== Campeonato Paranaense ===
8 January 2026 1	Andraus	1–2	Athletico Paranaense

11 January 2026 2	Cianorte	1–1	Athletico Paranaense

14 January 2026 3	Athletico Paranaense	2–0	Operário Ferroviário

17 January 2026 4	Athletico Paranaense	0–1	Coritiba

20 January 2026 5	Azuriz	2–1	Athletico Paranaense

24 January 2026 6	Athletico Paranaense	4–1	Galo Maringá

==== Quarter-finals ====
3 February 2026 First leg	Athletico Paranaense	5–0	Foz do Iguaçu

7 February 2026 Second leg	Foz do Iguaçu	1–3 (1–8 agg.)	Athletico Paranaense

==== Semi-finals ====
15 February 2026 First leg	Londrina	2–2	Athletico Paranaense

22 February 2026 Second leg	Athletico Paranaense	0–1 (2–3 agg.)	Londrina

=== Copa do Brasil ===
==== Fifth round ====
23 April 2026 First leg	Athletico Paranaense (Paraná (state))	0–0	(Goiás) Atlético Goianiense	Curitiba
21:30				Stadium: Arena da Baixada; Attendance: 18,261; Referee: Paulo Cesar Zanovelli da Silva

14 May 2026 Second leg	Atlético Goianiense (Goiás)	0–0 (0–0 agg.) (1–4 p)	(Paraná (state)) Athletico Paranaense	Goiânia
19:00	Tito (yellow card) 21'; Geovany Soares (yellow card) 28'; Gustavo Coutinho (yellow card) 36'; Marrony (yellow card) 43'		João Cruz (yellow card) 26'; Gilberto (yellow card) 57'; Esquivel (yellow card) 71'	Stadium: Estádio Antônio Accioly; Referee: Alex Gomes Stefano
	Penalties
	Cristiano (penalty missed); Lopes Guilherme (penalty missed); Junior Barreto (penalty scored)		(penalty scored) Viveros; (penalty scored) Mendoza; (penalty scored) Esquivel; (penalty scored) Jadson

==== Round of 16 ====
3 August 2026 First leg	Athletico Paranaense (Paraná (state))	2–0	(Bahia) Vitória	Curitiba
21:30	João Cruz 9'; Arthur Dias (yellow card) 26'; Leozinho (yellow card) 50'; Dudu 78', (yellow card) 85'		Martínez (yellow card) 21' (yellow-red card) 67'; Cacá (yellow card) 62'	Stadium: Arena da Baixada; Referee: Edina Alves Batista

6 August 2026 Second leg	Vitória (Bahia)	4–0 (4–2 agg.)	(Paraná (state)) Athletico Paranaense	Salvador
20:00				Stadium: Barradão
