= Felipe Chiqueti =

Brazilian footballer

Personal information
- Full name: Felipe Chiqueti Bandeira
- Date of birth: 9 February 2005 (age 21)
- Place of birth: São Paulo, Brazil
- Height: 1.76 m (5 ft 9 in)
- Position: Attacking midfielder

Team information
- Current team: Athletico Paranaense
- Number: 47

Youth career
- 2019–2025: Athletico Paranaense

Senior career*
| Years | Team | Apps | (Gls) |
| 2023– | Athletico Paranaense | 18 | (5) |
- * Club domestic league appearances and goals as of 18:58, 10 November 2026 (UTC)

Felipe Chiqueti Bandeira (born 9 February 2005), better known as Felipe Chiqueti, is a Brazilian professional footballer who plays as an attacking midfielder for Athletico Paranaense.

== Career ==
Born in São Paulo, Chiqueti began his career in the youth sectors of Athletico Paranaense in 2019. For the club, he gained great prominence by being the top scorer in the 2022 Campeonato Brasileiro Sub-17.

He made his professional debut against Corinthians, in the 2023 Campeonato Brasileiro Série A.

== Career statistics ==
As of 10 November 2026

| Club | Season | League | | | State League | | Cup | | Continental | | Other | | Total | |
| Club | Season | Division | Apps | Goals | Apps | Goals | Apps | Goals | Apps | Goals | Apps | Goals | Apps | Goals |
|---|---|---|---|---|---|---|---|---|---|---|---|---|---|---|
| Athletico Paranaense | 2023 | Série A | 1 | 0 | — | | — | | — | | — | | 1 | 0 |
| Athletico Paranaense | 2025 | Série B | 0 | 0 | 0 | 0 | 0 | 0 | — | | 6 (Note: Appearance(s) in Copa Paraná) | 1 | 6 | 1 |
| Athletico Paranaense | 2026 | Série A | 9 | 0 | 8 | 5 | 2 | 0 | — | | 1 | 0 | 20 | 5 |
| Career total | | | 10 | 0 | 8 | 5 | 2 | 0 | 0 | 0 | 7 | 1 | 27 | 6 |

== Honours ==
Athletico Paranaense

- Campeonato Paranaense: 2023, 2024
