= Kauan Alemão =

Brazilian footballer

Personal information
- Full name: Kauan Felipe Klisman Rocha
- Date of birth: 9 February 2007 (age 19)
- Place of birth: Pontal, Brazil
- Position: Centre-back

Team information
- Current team: Athletico Paranaense (on loan from Novorizontino)
- Number: 15

Youth career
- 2022–: Novorizontino
- 2026–: → Athletico Paranaense (loan)

Senior career*
Years	Team	Apps	(Gls)
2026–	Novorizontino	9	(0)
2026–	→ Athletico Paranaense (loan)	1	(0)
- * Club domestic league appearances and goals as of 14:29, 28 October 2026 (UTC)

Kauan Felipe Klisman Rocha (born 9 February 2007), known as Kauan Alemão or just Alemão, is a Brazilian footballer who plays as a centre-back for Athletico Paranaense, on loan from Novorizontino.

== Career ==
Born in Pontal, São Paulo, Alemão joined Novorizontino's youth sides in 2022, and was promoted to the first team after the 2026 Copa São Paulo de Futebol Júnior. He made his senior debut on 15 February of that year, coming on as a half-time substitute for Nicolas Careca in a 3–0 Campeonato Paulista away loss to Red Bull Bragantino.

Mainly a backup option, Alemão moved to Athletico Paranaense on loan in September 2026, initially for the under-20 team. After playing in the Copa Paraná, he made his Série A debut on 24 October, replacing Bruno Baldini late into a 1–1 away draw against Vitória.

== Career statistics ==
As of 28 October 2026.

Club	Season	League			State League		Cup		Continental		Other		Total	
Club	Season	Division	Apps	Goals	Apps	Goals	Apps	Goals	Apps	Goals	Apps	Goals	Apps	Goals
Novorizontino	2026	Série B	6	0	3	0	0	0	—		4 (Note: Appearance(s) in Copa Sul-Sudeste)	1	13	1
Athletico Paranaense (loan)	2026	Série A	1	0	—		—		—		6 (Note: Appearance(s) in Copa Paraná)	0	7	0
Career total			7	0	3	0	0	0	0	0	10	1	20	1
