= Claudinho (footballer, born 2005) =

Brazilian footballer

Personal information
- Full name: Claudio Henrique de Jesus Passos
- Date of birth: 27 October 2005 (age 21)
- Place of birth: Uberaba, Brazil
- Position: Left-back

Team information
- Current team: Athletico Paranaense
- Number: 26

Youth career
- São Paulo
- 2023–2025: Desportivo Brasil
- 2025: → Athletico Paranaense (loan)

Senior career*
Years	Team	Apps	(Gls)
2024–2025	Desportivo Brasil	25	(1)
2026–	Athletico Paranaense	13	(0)
- * Club domestic league appearances and goals as of 16:55, 10 November 2026 (UTC)

Claudio Henrique de Jesus Passos (born 26 October 2005), commonly known as Claudinho, is a Brazilian footballer who plays as a left-back for Athletico Paranaense.

== Career ==
Born in Uberaba, Minas Gerais, Claudinho spent a short period in the youth sides of São Paulo before moving to Desportivo Brasil in 2023. He started to appear with the latter's senior team in the following year, in the Campeonato Paulista Série A3.

In 2025, Claudinho joined Athletico Paranaense initially for the under-20 team, on loan. After signing a permanent deal in December of that year, and subsequently played with the club's under-23 squad in the Campeonato Paranaense.

Claudinho first appeared with the main squad on 18 May 2026, coming on as a first-half substitute for injured Léo Derik in a 1–1 Série A home draw against Flamengo. On 7 July, he renewed his contract until 2030.

== Career statistics ==
As of 10 November 2026

Club	Season	League			State League		Cup		Continental		Other		Total	
Club	Season	Division	Apps	Goals	Apps	Goals	Apps	Goals	Apps	Goals	Apps	Goals	Apps	Goals
Desportivo Brasil	2024	Paulista A3	—		9	0	—		—		—		9	0
Desportivo Brasil	2025	Paulista A3	—		16	1	—		—		—		16	1
Desportivo Brasil	Total		—		25	1	—		—		—		25	1
Athletico Paranaense	2025	Série B	—		—		—		—		6 (Note: Appearance(s) in Taça FPF)	0	6	0
Athletico Paranaense	2026	Série A	9	0	7	0	0	0	—		1	0	17	0
Athletico Paranaense	Total		9	0	7	0	0	0	—		7	0	23	0
Total			9	0	32	1	0	0	0	0	7	0	48	1
