= Bruno Baldini =

Brazilian footballer

Personal information
- Full name: Bruno Gonçalves Baldini
- Date of birth: 20 March 2007 (age 19)
- Place of birth: Barueri, Brazil
- Height: 1.88 m (6 ft 2 in)
- Position: Centre-back

Team information
- Current team: Athletico Paranaense
- Number: 55

Youth career
- Grêmio Barueri (futsal)
- Portuguesa (futsal)
- São Paulo
- Audax
- 2023–2024: SKA Brasil
- 2024–2025: Avaí
- 2026–: Athletico Paranaense

Senior career*
Years	Team	Apps	(Gls)
2026	Avaí	18	(1)
2026–	Athletico Paranaense	1	(0)
- * Club domestic league appearances and goals as of 20:09, 27 October 2026 (UTC)

Bruno Gonçalves Baldini (born 20 March 2007) is a Brazilian footballer who plays as a centre-back for Athletico Paranaense.

== Career ==
Born in Barueri, São Paulo, Baldini began his career in futsal, playing for Grêmio Barueri and Portuguesa before joining São Paulo FC's youth sides at the age of ten, where he played in both futsal and football categories. Initially a forward or a midfielder, he moved to Audax, where he became a centre-back, and had a stint at SKA Brasil before joining Avaí in October 2024.

Promoted to the first team for the 2026 season, Baldini made his senior debut on 14 January 2026, starting and scoring the winner in a 1–0 Campeonato Catarinense home success over Carlos Renaux. He subsequently established himself as a starter, and renewed his contract until December 2028 on 6 March.

On 29 May 2026, Athletico Paranaense announced the signing of Baldini on a contract until December 2030; he was initially assigned to the under-20 team. He made his Série A debut on 24 October, starting in a 1–1 away draw against Vitória.

== Career statistics ==
As of 27 October 2026.

Club	Season	League			State League		Cup		Continental		Other		Total	
Club	Season	Division	Apps	Goals	Apps	Goals	Apps	Goals	Apps	Goals	Apps	Goals	Apps	Goals
Avaí	2025	Série B	—		—		—		—		2 (Note: Appearance(s) in Copa Santa Catarina)	0	2	0
Avaí	2026	Série B	9	0	9	1	2	0	—		2 (Note: One appearance in Recopa Catarinense, one appearance in Copa Sul-Sudeste)	0	22	1
Avaí	Total		9	0	9	1	2	0	—		4	0	24	1
Athletico Paranaense	2026	Série A	1	0	—		—		—		—		1	0
Career total			10	0	9	1	2	0	0	0	4	0	25	1

== Honours ==
Avaí

- Recopa Catarinense: 2026
