= Arthur Dias =

Brazilian footballer

Personal information
- Full name: Arthur dos Santos Barbosa Dias
- Date of birth: 10 April 2007 (age 19)
- Place of birth: Campo Grande, Brazil
- Height: 1.87 m (6 ft 2 in)
- Position: Centre-back

Team information
- Current team: Athletico Paranaense
- Number: 4

Youth career
- 2022–2025: Athletico Paranaense

Senior career*
Years	Team	Apps	(Gls)
2025–	Athletico Paranaense	50	(1)

International career^{‡}
2024	Brazil U17	3	(1)
2025–	Brazil U20	13	(2)
2026–	Brazil	2	(0)
- * Club domestic league appearances and goals as of 15:30, 10 November 2026 (UTC) ‡ National team caps and goals as of 15:30, 10 November 2026 (UTC)

Arthur dos Santos Barbosa Dias (born 10 April 2007), known as Arthur Dias, is a Brazilian footballer who plays as a centre-back for Athletico Paranaense and the Brazil national team.

== Club career ==
Born in Campo Grande, Mato Grosso do Sul, Arthur Dias joined Athletico Paranaense's youth sides in 2022, and signed his first professional contract with the club in September 2023. He made his first team debut on 27 July 2025, coming on as a second-half substitute for Léo Derik in a 2–2 Série B away draw against América Mineiro; in that match, he also committed a penalty which resulted in the draw.

Arthur Dias became a first-choice in August 2025, and renewed his link until December 2028 on 5 September. He scored his first professional goal on 11 September 2026, netting his side's second in a 3–3 Série A away draw against rivals Coritiba.

== International career ==
On 20 June 2024, Arthur Dias was called up to the Brazil national under-17 team for the Cascais Luso Cup. On 14 January of the following year, he was called up to the 2025 South American U-20 Championship with the under-20 side, playing in eight of the nation's nine matches in the tournament.

On 9 September 2026, Arthur Dias was called up to the full side by Carlo Ancelotti for two friendlies against Australia and one against India.

== Career statistics ==
=== Club ===
As of 10 November 2026

Club	Season	League			State League		Cup		Continental		Other		Total	
Club	Season	Division	Apps	Goals	Apps	Goals	Apps	Goals	Apps	Goals	Apps	Goals	Apps	Goals
Athletico Paranaense	2025	Série B	17	0	0	0	0	0	—		—		17	0
Athletico Paranaense	2026	Série A	31	1	2	0	4	0	—		—		37	1
Total			48	1	2	0	4	0	0	0	0	0	54	1

=== International ===
As of 10 November 2026

Appearances and goals by national team and year
National team	Year	Apps	Goals
Brazil	2026	2	0
Total		2	0

== Honours ==
Brazil U17

- Cascais Luso Cup: 2024

Brazil U20

- South American U-20 Championship: 2025
