= Dudu (footballer, born 2006) =

Brazilian association football player

Personal information
- Full name: Eduardo Kogitzki Anastacio
- Date of birth: 1 January 2006 (age 20)
- Place of birth: Curitiba, Brazil
- Height: 1.77 m (5 ft 10 in)
- Position: Midfielder

Team information
- Current team: Athletico Paranaense
- Number: 53

Youth career
- 2019–2024: Athletico Paranaense

Senior career*
Years	Team	Apps	(Gls)
2023–	Athletico Paranaense	50	(4)

International career^{‡}
2022–2023	Brazil U17	17	(3)
- * Club domestic league appearances and goals as of 19:03, 10 November 2026 (UTC) ‡ National team caps and goals as of 29 March 2023

Eduardo Kogitzki Anastacio (born 1 January 2006), known as Dudu Kogitzki or just Dudu, is a Brazilian footballer who plays as a midfielder for Athletico Paranaense.

== Club career ==
From Curitiba, Dudu initially played futsal and joined Athletico Paranaense at the age of 13 years-old in 2019. In September 2022, he signed his first professional contract with the club. In November 2023, he signed a new three-year contract with the club.

== International career ==
He played for Brazil U17 at the 2023 South American U-17 Championship. He subsequently impressed playing as a left-footed playmaker at the 2023 FIFA U-17 World Cup.

== Career statistics ==
As of 10 November 2026

Club	Season	League			State League		Cup		Continental		Other		Total	
Club	Season	Division	Apps	Goals	Apps	Goals	Apps	Goals	Apps	Goals	Apps	Goals	Apps	Goals
Athletico Paranaense	2023	Série A	1	0	—		—		—		—		1	0
Athletico Paranaense	2024	Série A	0	0	1	0	0	0	1 (Note: Appearance(s) in Copa Sudamericana)	0	—		2	0
Athletico Paranaense	2025	Série B	19	3	0	0	4	0	—		—		23	3
Athletico Paranaense	2026	Série A	23	1	6	0	4	1	—		—		33	2
Career total			43	4	7	0	8	1	1	0	0	0	59	5
