= Riquelme (footballer, born 2005) =

Brazilian footballer

Personal information
- Full name: Diogo Riquelme Rivas do Nascimento
- Date of birth: 23 April 2005 (age 21)
- Place of birth: Ferraz de Vasconcelos, Brazil
- Height: 1.81 m (5 ft 11 in)
- Position: Midfielder

Team information
- Current team: Athletico Paranaense
- Number: 63

Youth career
- 2016–2018: Palmeiras
- 2019–2022: Red Bull Bragantino
- 2023–2025: Athletico Paranaense

Senior career*
Years	Team	Apps	(Gls)
2025–	Athletico Paranaense	17	(2)
- * Club domestic league appearances and goals as of 19:05, 10 November 2026 (UTC)

Diogo Riquelme Rivas do Nascimento (born 23 April 2005), known as Diogo Riquelme or just Riquelme, is a Brazilian footballer who plays as a midfielder for Athletico Paranaense.

== Career ==
Born in Ferraz de Vasconcelos, São Paulo, Riquelme joined Athletico Paranaense's youth sides in 2023, after playing for Red Bull Bragantino and Palmeiras. He made his first team debut with the former on 9 February 2025, coming on as a late substitute for João Cruz in a 3–2 Campeonato Paranaense away win over Maringá.

On 14 August 2025, Riquelme renewed his contract with Furacão until December 2028. He scored his first senior goal the following 24 January, netting his side's fourth in a 4–1 home routing of Galo Maringá.

== Career statistics ==
As of 10 November 2026

Club	Season	League			State League		Cup		Continental		Other		Total	
Club	Season	Division	Apps	Goals	Apps	Goals	Apps	Goals	Apps	Goals	Apps	Goals	Apps	Goals
Athletico Paranaense	2025	Série B	4	0	1	0	1	0	—		5 (Note: Appearance(s) in Copa Paraná)	0	11	0
Athletico Paranaense	2026	Série A	5	0	7	2	0	0	—		6	0	18	2
Total			9	0	8	2	1	0	0	0	11	0	29	2
