= Hayen =

Hayen can refer to:

- Hayen Palacios (born 1999), Colombian footballer
- Nicky Hayen (born 1980), Belgian football manager and former player
