= Santos (footballer, born 1990) =

Brazilian footballer (born 1990)

Personal information
- Full name: Aderbar Melo dos Santos Neto
- Date of birth: 17 March 1990 (age 36)
- Place of birth: Campina Grande, Brazil
- Height: 1.88 m (6 ft 2 in)
- Position: Goalkeeper

Team information
- Current team: Athletico Paranaense (on loan from Fortaleza)
- Number: 23

Youth career
- 2006–2008: Porto-PE
- 2008–2010: Athletico Paranaense

Senior career*
Years	Team	Apps	(Gls)
2010–2022	Athletico Paranaense	180	(0)
2022–2023	Flamengo	33	(0)
2024–	Fortaleza	0	(0)
2025–	→ Athletico Paranaense (loan)	48	(0)

International career^{‡}
2021	Brazil U23 (O.P.)	6	(0)
Medal record
Men's football
Representing Brazil
Olympic Games
Gold medal – first place	2020 Tokyo	Team
- * Club domestic league appearances and goals as of 16:51, 10 November 2026 (UTC) ‡ National team caps and goals as of 14:18, 7 August 2021 (UTC)

Aderbar Melo dos Santos Neto (born 17 March 1990), commonly known as Santos, is a Brazilian professional footballer who plays as a goalkeeper for Athletico Paranaense, on loan from Fortaleza.

== Club career ==
=== Athletico Paranaense ===
Born in Campina Grande, Paraíba, Santos joined Athletico Paranaense's youth setup in 2008, aged 18. He was promoted to the main squad in 2010, as a fourth-choice.

Santos made his professional debut on 17 November 2012, starting in a 0–0 away draw against Criciúma, for the Série B championship. In 2013, he was promoted to second-choice, only behind Wéverton.

A starter during the year's Campeonato Paranaense (which Furacão only used under-23 players), Santos made his Série A debut on 20 October 2013, replacing injured Weverton in a 0–3 away loss against Goiás.

Santos remained as a backup to Weverton in the following seasons. In 2018, as the latter departed to Palmeiras, he became an undisputed starter. On 18 April of that year, he extended his contract until October 2020.

=== Flamengo ===
On 3 April 2022, Flamengo announced the signing of Santos on a contract until December 2025.

== International career ==
On 19 September 2019, after lifting the 2019 Copa do Brasil, Santos was called up to the Brazil national team by manager Tite for two friendlies against Senegal and Nigeria, in October.

On 17 June 2021, Santos was named in the Brazil squad for the 2020 Summer Olympics.

== Career statistics ==
As of 10 November 2026

Club	Season	League			State League		Cup		Continental		Other		Total	
Club	Season	Division	Apps	Goals	Apps	Goals	Apps	Goals	Apps	Goals	Apps	Goals	Apps	Goals
Athletico Paranaense	2010	Série A	0	0	0	0	0	0	—		—		0	0
Athletico Paranaense	2011	Série A	0	0	0	0	0	0	2 (Note: Appearance(s) in Copa Sudamericana)	0	—		2	0
Athletico Paranaense	2012	Série B	1	0	0	0	0	0	—		—		1	0
Athletico Paranaense	2013	Série A	1	0	23	0	0	0	—		—		24	0
Athletico Paranaense	2014	Série A	3	0	0	0	0	0	0	0	—		3	0
Athletico Paranaense	2015	Série A	1	0	0	0	0	0	0	0	—		1	0
Athletico Paranaense	2016	Série A	8	0	2	0	0	0	—		0	0	10	0
Athletico Paranaense	2017	Série A	4	0	8	0	0	0	0	0	—		12	0
Athletico Paranaense	2018	Série A	32	0	4	0	8	0	12	0	—		56	0
Athletico Paranaense	2019	Série A	28	0	0	0	8	0	8 (Note: Appearance(s) in Copa Libertadores)	0	3 (Note: Two appearances in Recopa Sudamericana, one appearance in J.League Cup / Copa Sudamericana Championship)	0	43	0
Athletico Paranaense	2020	Série A	33	0	7	0	2	0	4	0	1 (Note: Appearance(s) in Supercopa do Brasil)	0	47	0
Athletico Paranaense	2021	Série A	18	0	2	0	4	0	8	0	—		32	0
Athletico Paranaense	2022	Série A	—		5	0	—		—		2 (Note: Appearance(s) in Recopa Sudamericana)	0	7	0
Athletico Paranaense	Total		129	0	51	0	22	0	34	0	6	0	242	0
Flamengo	2022	Série A	18	0	—		8	0	10	0	—		37	0
Flamengo	2023	Série A	6	0	9	0	3	0	3	0	5 (Note: One appearance in Supercopa do Brasil, two appearances in FIFA Club World Cup, two appearances in Recopa Sudamericana)	0	26	0
Flamengo	Total		24	0	9	0	11	0	13	0	5	0	63	0
Fortaleza	2024	Série A	0	0	0	0	0	0	0	0	4 (Note: Appearance(s) in Copa do Nordeste)	0	4	0
Athletico Paranaense (loan)	2025	Série B	21	0	1	0	4	0	—		—		26	0
Athletico Paranaense (loan)	2026	Série A	24	0	2	0	4	0	—		—		30	0
Athletico Paranaense (loan)	Total		45	0	3	0	8	0	—		—		56	0
Career total			198	0	63	0	41	0	47	0	15	0	365	0

== Honours ==
Athletico Paranaense

- Copa Sudamericana: 2018, 2021
- J.League Cup / Copa Sudamericana Championship: 2019
- Copa do Brasil: 2019
- Campeonato Paranaense: 2016, 2018, 2020

Flamengo

- Copa Libertadores: 2022
- Copa do Brasil: 2022

Fortaleza

- Copa do Nordeste: 2024

Brazil Olympic

- Summer Olympics: 2020

Individual

- Campeonato Brasileiro Série A Team of the Year: 2019
- Campeonato Brasileiro Série A most clean sheets: 2018
- IFFHS Olympic Goalkeeper of the Tournament: 2020
- Copa Libertadores Team of the Tournament: 2022
