= Alejandro García (footballer, born 2001) =

Colombian footballer (born 2001)

Personal information
- Full name: Alejandro García Castillo
- Date of birth: 28 February 2001 (age 25)
- Place of birth: Manizales, Colombia
- Height: 1.80 m (5 ft 11 in)
- Position: Midfielder

Team information
- Current team: Athletico Paranaense
- Number: 17

Youth career
- Once Caldas

Senior career*
Years	Team	Apps	(Gls)
2017–2025	Once Caldas	152	(7)
2026–	Athletico Paranaense	2	(0)

International career
2019	Colombia U18	1	(1)
2019–2020	Colombia U20	2	(0)
2023–2024	Colombia U23	6	(0)
- * Club domestic league appearances and goals as of 7 April 2026

Alejandro García Castillo (born 28 February 2001) is a Colombian professional footballer who plays as a midfielder for Brasil Série A club Athletico Paranaense.

== Club career ==
Born in Manizales, García was an Once Caldas youth graduate. He made his first team debut on 15 March 2017, coming on as a second-half substitute in a 1–0 home loss to Rionegro Águilas, for the year's Copa Colombia. Mainly a member of the under-20 team, he made his Categoría Primera A debut on 10 September 2018, replacing Marcelino Carreazo in an away loss to the same opponent for the same scoreline.

Promoted to the first team in 2019, García only became a starter in 2021, and scored his first professional goal on 27 March of that year, netting his side's fourth in a 4–2 home win over Boyacá Chicó. In the following campaigns, he continued to feature regularly.

== International career ==
García represented Colombia at under-18, under-20 and under-23 levels, featuring in the 2023 Pan American Games and the 2024 CONMEBOL Pre-Olympic Tournament with the latter.

== Career statistics ==
As of 10 November 2026

Appearances and goals by club, season and competition
Club	Season	League			National cup (Note: Includes Copa Colombia)		Continental		State league (Note: Includes Campeonato Paranaense)		Other		Total	
Club	Season	Division	Apps	Goals	Apps	Goals	Apps	Goals	Apps	Goals	Apps	Goals	Apps	Goals
Once Caldas	2017	Categoría Primera A	0	0	1	0	—		—		—		1	0
Once Caldas	2018	Categoría Primera A	5	0	1	0	—		—		—		6	0
Once Caldas	2019	Categoría Primera A	2	0	0	0	0	0	—		—		2	0
Once Caldas	2020	Categoría Primera A	8	0	0	0	—		—		—		8	0
Once Caldas	2021	Categoría Primera A	26	3	1	0	—		—		—		27	3
Once Caldas	2022	Categoría Primera A	15	1	0	0	—		—		—		15	1
Once Caldas	2023	Categoría Primera A	27	1	2	0	—		—		—		29	1
Once Caldas	2024	Categoría Primera A	41	1	3	0	—		—		—		44	1
Once Caldas	2025	Categoría Primera A	28	1	1	0	11 (Note: Appearances in Copa Sudamericana)	1	—		—		40	2
Once Caldas	Total		152	7	9	0	11	1	—		—		172	8
Athletico Paranaense	2026	Série A	0	0	0	0	—		2	0	5 (Note: Appearances in Copa Paraná)	0	7	0
Career total			152	7	9	0	11	1	2	0	7	0	179	8
