= Reidiney =

Brazilian footballer

Personal information
- Full name: Francisco Reidiney Duarte Gomes
- Date of birth: 14 December 2006 (age 19)
- Place of birth: Sobral, Brazil
- Height: 1.75 m (5 ft 9 in)
- Position: Winger

Team information
- Current team: Novorizontino
- Number: 41

Youth career
- Tianguá
- Guarany de Sobral
- 2023–2026: Novorizontino

Senior career*
Years	Team	Apps	(Gls)
2023	Guarany de Sobral	0	(0)
2026–	Novorizontino	24	(1)
- * Club domestic league appearances and goals as of 17 November 2026

Francisco Reidiney Duarte Gomes (born 14 December 2006), known as Reidiney, is a Brazilian professional footballer who plays for Novorizontino. Mainly a winger, he can also play as a right-back.

== Career ==
Born in Sobral, Ceará, Reidiney was invited to join the youth categories of Guarany de Sobral after playing for Tianguá in a friendly against their under-20 team. In 2023, after already making his first team debut with Guarany, he moved to Novorizontino and returned to the youth setup.

After playing senior matches in the Copa Sul-Sudeste, Reidiney made his Série B debut on 22 June 2026, starting in a 2–0 away win over Ponte Preta. He subsequently started to feature regularly with the main squad, and scored his first senior goal on 26 July, in a 4–1 away routing of Londrina.

== Career statistics ==
As of 17 November 2026

Club	Season	League			State League		Cup		Continental		Other		Total	
Club	Season	Division	Apps	Goals	Apps	Goals	Apps	Goals	Apps	Goals	Apps	Goals	Apps	Goals
Guarany de Sobral	2023	Cearense Série B	—		—		—		—		1 (Note: Appearance(s) in Taça Fares Lopes)	0	1	0
Novorizontino	2026	Série B	24	1	—		—		—		3 (Note: Appearance(s) in Copa Sul-Sudeste)	0	27	1
Career total			24	1	0	0	0	0	0	0	4	0	28	1
