= Dantas (footballer) =

Brazilian footballer

Personal information
- Full name: João Vitor Silva Dantas de Oliveira
- Date of birth: 25 July 2004 (age 22)
- Place of birth: Rio de Janeiro, Brazil
- Height: 1.89 m (6 ft 2 in)
- Positions: Centre-back; defensive midfielder

Team information
- Current team: Athletico Paranaense (on loan from Novorizontino)
- Number: 25

Youth career
- 2019: Barra da Tijuca
- 2021–2023: Bangu
- 2022–2023: → Novorizontino (loan)
- 2024–2025: Novorizontino

Senior career*
Years	Team	Apps	(Gls)
2024–	Novorizontino	59	(2)
2026–	→ Athletico Paranaense (loan)	7	(0)
- * Club domestic league appearances and goals as of 16:53, 10 November 2026 (UTC)

João Vitor Silva Dantas de Oliveira (born 25 July 2004), commonly known as Dantas, is a Brazilian professional footballer who plays as a centre-back or a defensive midfielder for Athletico Paranaense, on loan from Novorizontino.

== Career ==
Born in Rio de Janeiro, Dantas played for Barra da Tijuca and Bangu before joining the youth categories of Novorizontino in 2022. Initially on loan, he signed a permanent contract with the club ahead of the 2024 season.

After playing for the under-20 team, Dantas made his first team debut on 3 March 2024, coming on as a late substitute for Waguininho in a 1–1 Campeonato Paulista away draw against Ponte Preta. In the following campaign, after a short period back with the under-20s, he became a first-choice in the main squad.

Dantas scored his first senior goal on 8 September 2025, netting the opener in a 1–1 home draw against Atlético Goianiense. A regular starter, he was loaned to Série A side Athletico Paranaense on 9 July 2026.

== Career statistics ==
As of 10 November 2026

Club	Season	League			State League		Cup		Continental		Other		Total	
Club	Season	Division	Apps	Goals	Apps	Goals	Apps	Goals	Apps	Goals	Apps	Goals	Apps	Goals
Novorizontino	2024	Série B	6	0	3	0	—		—		—		9	0
Novorizontino	2025	Série B	26	2	7	0	3	0	—		—		36	2
Novorizontino	2026	Série B	7	0	10	0	3	1	—		—		20	1
Novorizontino	Total		39	2	20	0	6	1	—		—		65	3
Athletico Paranaense (loan)	2026	Série A	7	0	—		—		—		—		7	0
Career total			46	2	20	0	6	1	0	0	0	0	72	3

== Honours ==
Novorizontino

- Campeonato Paulista Sub-20: 2024

Individual

- Campeonato Paulista Team of the Year: 2026
