= Jorge Rivaldo =

Colombian footballer (born 2003)

Personal information
- Full name: Jorge Luis Rivaldo Pinto
- Date of birth: 28 September 2003 (age 23)
- Place of birth: Barranquilla, Colombia
- Height: 1.89 m (6 ft 2 in)
- Position: Forward

Team information
- Current team: Athletico Paranaense
- Number: 19

Youth career
- Estrella Roja
- Ringo Amaya
- Fortaleza CEIF

Senior career*
Years	Team	Apps	(Gls)
2022–2024	Fortaleza CEIF	4	(0)
2024–2025	Tigres	23	(8)
2025	→ Águilas Doradas (loan)	11	(5)
2026	Águilas Doradas	19	(11)
2026–	Athletico Paranaense	9	(1)
- * Club domestic league appearances and goals as of 16:39, 10 November 2026 (UTC)

Jorge Luis Rivaldo Pinto (born 28 September 2003) is a Colombian footballer who plays as a forward for Brazilian club Athletico Paranaense.

== Career ==
=== Early career ===
Born in Barranquilla, Rivaldo represented Fortaleza CEIF as a youth, and made his first team debut on 8 October 2022, coming on as a late substitute in a 3–1 Categoría Primera B home win over Valledupar. In July 2024, after being rarely used, he moved to Tigres.

In July 2025, Rivaldo moved to Categoría Primera A side Águilas Doradas on loan. After agreeing to a permanent deal ahead of the 2026 season, he scored 11 goals in just 19 matches during the Apertura tournament, being the club's top scorer.

=== Athletico Paranaense ===
On 6 June 2026, Campeonato Brasileiro Série A side Athletico Paranaense announced the signing of Rivaldo on a four-year contract.

== Career statistics ==
As of 10 November 2026.

Club	Season	League			Cup		Continental		Other		Total	
Club	Season	Division	Apps	Goals	Apps	Goals	Apps	Goals	Apps	Goals	Apps	Goals
Fortaleza CEIF	2022	Categoría Primera B	1	0	0	0	—		—		1	0
Fortaleza CEIF	2023	Categoría Primera B	3	0	0	0	—		—		3	0
Fortaleza CEIF	2024	Categoría Primera A	0	0	0	0	—		—		0	0
Fortaleza CEIF	Total		4	0	0	0	—		—		4	0
Tigres	2024	Categoría Primera B	12	3	0	0	—		—		12	3
Tigres	2025	Categoría Primera B	11	5	0	0	—		—		11	5
Tigres	Total		23	8	0	0	—		—		23	8
Águilas Doradas	2025	Categoría Primera A	11	5	0	0	—		—		11	5
Águilas Doradas	2025	Categoría Primera A	19	11	1	0	—		—		20	11
Águilas Doradas	Total		30	16	1	0	—		—		31	16
Athletico Paranaense	2026	Série A	9	1	1	0	—		1 (Note: Appearance(s) in Copa Paraná)	0	11	1
Career total			66	25	2	0	0	0	1	0	69	25
