= 2025 Avaí FC season =

Avaí FC
2025 season
- Manager: Enderson Moreira
- Stadium: Estádio da Ressacada
- Série B: Pre-season
- Campeonato Catarinense: Pre-season
- Average home league attendance: 6,600

The 2025 season is the 101st year of Avaí Futebol Clube's history. The club will participate in the Campeonato Brasileiro Série B for the second consecutive season and the Campeonato Catarinense.

== Competitions ==
=== Overall record ===
Competition	First match	Last match	Starting round	Record							
Competition	First match	Last match	Starting round	Pld	W	D	L	GF	GA	GD	Win %
Série B	5 April 2025	22 November 2025	Matchday 1	0	0	0	0	0	0	+0	—
Campeonato Catarinense	15 January 2025			2	1	1	0	1	0	+1	50.00
Total				2	1	1	0	1	0	+1	50.00

Last updated: 18 January 2025
Source: Competitions

=== Série B ===
==== League table ====
Pos	Team	Pld	W	D	L	GF	GA	GD	Pts
7	Novorizontino	38	15	15	8	43	32	+11	60
8	CRB	38	16	8	14	45	40	+5	56
9	Avaí	38	14	14	10	50	40	+10	56
10	Cuiabá	38	14	12	12	43	44	−1	54
11	Atlético Goianiense	38	13	13	12	39	38	+1	52

Source: CBF
Rules for classification: 1) points; 2) wins; 3) goal difference; 4) goals scored; 5) head-to-head results (only between 2 teams); 6) fewest red cards; 7) fewest yellow cards; 8) drawing of lots.

==== Matches ====
28 July 2025 19	Avaí	5–0	Botafogo-SP

3 August 2025 20	Novorizontino	1–1	Avaí

10 August 2025 21	Avaí	2–0	Cuiabá

19 August 2025 22	Operário Ferroviário	v	Avaí

=== Campeonato Catarinense ===
==== Results by round ====
Round	1	2	3
Ground	H	A	A
Result	W	D	
Position			

Updated to match(es) played on 18 January 2025. Source:
A = Away; H = Home; W = Win; D = Draw; L = Loss

15 January 2025 1	Avaí	1–0	Santa Catarina	Florianópolis
20:30 UTC−3	Hygor 71'			Stadium: Estádio da Ressacada

18 January 2025 2	Brusque	0–0	Avaí
16:30 UTC−3

22 January 2025 3	Caravaggio	v	Avaí
19:00 UTC−3
