= 1990 Campeonato Brasileiro Série B =

Season of football team

The 1990 Campeonato Brasileiro Série B was the second division of Brazilian football, played by 24 teams. It began in August 1990 and ended on December 6, 1990. Sport Recife won the tournament title, beating Athletico Paranaense in the finals.

== Format ==
First Phase

The 24 participants were divided into four groups of six teams each. The teams competed in round within groups and robin, qualifying to the next stage the top four of each shift. The four teams with the worst campaigns would be relegated to 1991 Série C, but no such tournament happened, as CBF decided to include 64 clubs in the 1991 Série B, and cancel the Série C of that year.

Second Phase

The 16 qualified teams were divided into four groups with four teams each, playing in the group in turn and robin, qualifying the top two from each group to the next stage.

Third Phase

The 8 qualified teams were divided into two groups of four teams each, playing in the group in turn and robin, qualifying the best of each group for the final.

Final

The top placed teams of their respective groups in the third stage played the finals. Both gained access to the 1991 Campeonato Brasileiro Série A.

== First phase ==
=== Group A ===
Pos	Team	Pld	W	D	L	GF	GA	GD	Pts	Qualification or relegation
1	(Santa Catarina (state)) Criciúma	10	5	3	2	8	6	+2	13	Qualified to the second phase
2	(Santa Catarina (state)) Blumenau	10	3	5	2	5	3	+2	11	Qualified to the second phase
3	(Paraná (state)) Atlético-PR	10	2	7	1	7	2	+5	11	Qualified to the second phase
4	(Rio Grande do Sul) Juventude	10	3	4	3	6	7	−1	10	Qualified to the second phase
5	(Santa Catarina (state)) Joinville	10	2	5	3	8	8	0	9	Eliminated
6	(Paraná (state)) Coritiba	10	2	2	6	6	14	−8	6	Relegated to 1991 Série C

=== Group B ===
Pos	Team	Pld	W	D	L	GF	GA	GD	Pts	Qualification or relegation
1	(Paraná (state)) Grêmio Maringá	10	4	4	2	9	6	+3	12	Qualified to the second phase
2	(São Paulo (state)) XV de Piracicaba	10	4	4	2	13	12	+1	12	Qualified to the second phase
3	(São Paulo (state)) Botafogo-SP	10	4	3	3	14	6	+8	11	Qualified to the second phase
4	(São Paulo (state)) Guarani	10	4	2	4	13	11	+2	10	Qualified to the second phase
5	(Acre (state)) Rio Branco-AC	10	2	4	4	7	15	−8	8	Eliminated
6	(Goiás) Anapolina	10	1	5	4	9	15	−6	7	Relegated to 1991 Série C

=== Group C ===
Pos	Team	Pld	W	D	L	GF	GA	GD	Pts	Qualification or relegation
1	(Bahia) Catuense	10	5	4	1	14	6	+8	14	Qualified to the second phase
2	(Paraná (state)) Operário-PR	10	4	4	2	16	8	+8	12	Qualified to the second phase
3	(São Paulo (state)) Juventus	10	5	1	4	8	10	−2	11	Qualified to the second phase
4	(Rio de Janeiro (state)) Itaperuna	10	3	4	3	10	11	−1	10	Qualified to the second phase
5	(Pernambuco) Central	10	1	5	4	4	8	−4	7	Eliminated
6	(Rio de Janeiro (state)) Americano	10	2	2	6	4	13	−9	6	Relegated to 1991 Série C

=== Group D ===
Pos	Team	Pld	W	D	L	GF	GA	GD	Pts	Qualification or relegation
1	(Pernambuco) Sport	10	3	6	1	9	4	+5	12	Qualified to the second phase
2	(Maranhão) Moto Club	10	3	6	1	8	4	+4	12	Qualified to the second phase
3	(Pará) Remo	10	3	5	2	9	6	+3	11	Qualified to the second phase
4	Ceará	10	4	2	4	8	9	−1	10	Qualified to the second phase
5	(Pernambuco) Santa Cruz	10	2	6	2	8	9	−1	10	Eliminated
6	(Paraíba) Treze	10	1	3	6	4	14	−10	5	Relegated to 1991 Série C

== Second phase ==
Group E
Pos	Team	Pld	W	D	L	GF	GA	GD	Pts	Qualification
1	Guarani	6	3	2	1	6	3	+3	8	Advanced to the Third phase
2	Criciúma	6	2	2	2	5	4	+1	6	Advanced to the Third phase
3	XV de Piracicaba	6	2	1	3	5	8	−3	5	
4	Blumenau	6	1	3	2	5	6	−1	5	

Group F
Pos	Team	Pld	W	D	L	GF	GA	GD	Pts	Qualification
1	Juventude	6	4	2	0	6	1	+5	10	Advanced to the Third phase
2	Atlético Paranaense	6	3	1	2	7	4	+3	7	Advanced to the Third phase
3	Botafogo-SP	6	2	2	2	4	3	+1	6	
4	Grêmio Maringá	6	0	1	5	3	12	−9	1	

Group G
Pos	Team	Pld	W	D	L	GF	GA	GD	Pts	Qualification
1	Catuense	6	3	1	2	6	5	+1	7	Advanced to the Third phase
2	Moto Club	6	3	0	3	4	3	+1	6	Advanced to the Third phase
3	Juventus	6	3	0	3	5	5	0	6	
4	Ceará	6	2	1	3	3	5	−2	5	

Group H
Pos	Team	Pld	W	D	L	GF	GA	GD	Pts	Qualification
1	Operário-PR	6	3	2	1	6	5	+1	8	Advanced to the Third phase
2	Sport	6	1	4	1	4	4	0	6	Advanced to the Third phase
3	Itaperuna	6	1	4	1	4	4	0	6	
4	Remo	6	1	2	3	5	6	−1	4	

== Third phase ==
Group I
Pos	Team	Pld	W	D	L	GF	GA	GD	Pts	Qualification
1	Sport	6	3	3	0	8	5	+3	9	Advanced to the final
2	Guarani	6	3	2	1	10	3	+7	8	
3	Juventude	6	2	2	2	6	7	−1	6	
4	Moto Club	6	0	1	5	5	14	−9	1	

Group J
Pos	Team	Pld	W	D	L	GF	GA	GD	Pts	Qualification
1	Atlético Paranaense	6	2	3	1	7	5	+2	7	Advanced to the final
2	Criciúma	6	2	2	2	10	5	+5	6	
3	Operário-PR	6	2	2	2	5	9	−4	6	
4	Catuense	6	2	1	3	7	10	−3	5	

Final

December 12, 1990

Atlético Paranaense	1–1	Sport

Pinheirão

December 16, 1990

Sport	0–0	Atlético Paranaense

Ilha do Retiro

Sport declared as Série B champions due to better season record.

=== Promotion ===
The champion and the runner-up, which are Sport and Atlético Paranaense, were promoted to the following year's first level.

=== Relegation ===
The four worst placed teams, which are Anapolina, Coritiba, Americano and Treze, were relegated to the following year's third level. However, the Second level was expanded to 64 clubs in the next year, eliminating any need for a Third level, and thus the relegations were cancelled.

== Champion ==
1990 Campeonato Brasileiro da Série B
Sport Recife
First title
