= Leozinho (footballer, born 1998) =

Brazilian footballer

Personal information
- Full name: Leonardo Caetano Silva
- Date of birth: 5 December 1998 (age 27)
- Place of birth: Petrópolis, Brazil
- Height: 1.73 m (5 ft 8 in)
- Position: Winger

Team information
- Current team: Athletico Paranaense
- Number: 21

Youth career
- 2017: Magnus Futsal (futsal)

Senior career*
Years	Team	Apps	(Gls)
2017–2022	Magnus Futsal (futsal)		
2023	Hercílio Luz	18	(3)
2024	Ituano	31	(2)
2025–	Athletico Paranaense	53	(9)

International career
2017–2018	Brazil U20 (futsal)		
2018–2022	Brazil (futsal)		
Medal record
Men's futsal
Representing Brazil
South American U-20 Futsal Championship
Winner	2018 Peru
- * Club domestic league appearances and goals as of 16:42, 10 November 2026 (UTC)

Leonardo Caetano Silva (born 5 December 1998), commonly known as Leozinho, is a Brazilian professional footballer who plays as a winger for Athletico Paranaense. He is a former futsal player who also played as a winger.

== Early life ==
Born in Petrópolis, Rio de Janeiro, Leozinho began his career with several futsal sides in his hometown. In 2016, he spent a trial period at Flamengo and was approved at Tigres do Brasil, but the move fell through. In the beginning of 2017, he was approved on a trial at Magnus Futsal.

== Futsal career ==
After making his senior debut with Magnus in the later months of 2017, Leozinho started to feature regularly for the club in the following years, being named Best Young Player in the World by Futsal Awards in 2019 and 2020. He also debuted for the Brazil national futsal team in 2018 and scored at the 2021 FIFA Futsal World Cup.

In July 2022, Leozinho was separated from the squad, later having his contract rescinded on 5 August. In November, he announced in a podcast that he would leave futsal to play 11-a-side football.

== Football career ==
Shortly after announcing his departure from futsal, Leozinho agreed to a deal with Mexican side Atlético San Luis, but the move fell through. On 13 February 2023, he was announced at Hercílio Luz.

Leozinho scored his first goal in football on 7 June 2023, netting the opener in a 2–2 Série D home draw against Caxias. He left Hercílio on 3 November, after three goals in 22 matches.

In February 2024, Leozinho signed a one-year contract with Série B side Ituano, after a trial period. After featuring in just one match in the 2024 Campeonato Paulista as the club suffered relegation, he subsequently started to feature more regularly under new head coach Alberto Valentim, and scored his first goal for the club on 7 September, netting the winner in a 3–2 home success over Mirassol.

On 8 January 2025, Leozinho joined Athletico Paranaense on a two-year contract and helped the Furacão return to the Série A after an unfortunate relegation.

== Career statistics ==
As of 10 November 2026

Appearances and goals by club, season and competition
Club	Season	League			State League		National Cup		Continental		Other		Total	
Club	Season	Division	Apps	Goals	Apps	Goals	Apps	Goals	Apps	Goals	Apps	Goals	Apps	Goals
Hercílio Luz	2023	Série D	13	3	5	0	—		—		4 (Note: Appearance(s) in Copa Santa Catarina)	0	22	3
Ituano	2024	Série B	30	2	1	0	1	0	—		—		32	2
Athletico Paranaense	2025	Série B	20	2	8	1	4	0	—		—		32	3
Athletico Paranaense	2026	Série A	20	5	5	1	3	0	—		—		28	6
Athletico Paranaense	Total		40	7	13	2	7	0	—		—		60	9
Career total			83	12	19	2	8	0	0	0	4	0	114	14

== Honours ==
Magnus Futsal

- Liga Paulista de Futsal: 2017
- Intercontinental Futsal Cup: 2018, 2019
- Liga Nacional de Futsal: 2020
- Campeonato Paulista de Futsal: 2020, 2021
- Supercopa do Brasil de Futsal: 2021
- Taça Brasil de Futsal: 2021

Brazil U20 (futsal)

- South American U-20 Futsal Championship: 2018

Individual

- Futsal Awards Best Young Player in the World: 2019, 2020
