= Léo Derik =

Brazilian footballer

Personal information
- Full name: Leonardo Derik Dias Gonçalves
- Date of birth: 24 July 2005 (age 21)
- Place of birth: São Paulo, Brazil
- Height: 1.66 m (5 ft 5 in)
- Position: Left-back

Team information
- Current team: Athletico Paranaense
- Number: 6

Youth career
- 2019–2024: Athletico Paranaense

Senior career*
Years	Team	Apps	(Gls)
2025–	Athletico Paranaense	34	(1)

International career
2024	Brazil U20	4	(0)
- * Club domestic league appearances and goals as of 15:33, 10 November 2026 (UTC)

Leonardo Derik Dias Gonçalves (born 24 July 2005), known as Léo Derik, is a Brazilian footballer who plays for Athletico Paranaense. Mainly a left-back, he can also play as a left winger.

== Club career ==
Born in São Paulo, Léo Derik joined Athletico Paranaense's youth sides in 2019, for the under-13s. He made his first team debut on 14 January 2025, coming on as a late substitute for Luiz Fernando in a 5–1 Campeonato Paranaense home routing of Rio Branco; he also participated in the club's last two goals, despite not providing any direct assists.

A backup option to Fernando, Léo Derik became a starter in August 2025, and scored his first professional goal on 16 September 2025, netting his side's second in a 3–2 away win over Chapecoense.

== International career ==
On 17 May 2024, Léo Derik was called up to the Brazil national under-20 team for a period of trainings. On 18 September of the following year, he was called up to the 2025 FIFA U-20 World Cup, and played in the nation's all three matches in the competition.

== Personal life ==
On 14 August 2026, Léo Derik was sentenced in first instance to 13 years in prison for raping a former affair in December 2023 and February 2024. Despite the Public Prosecutor's Office had sought Derik's acquittal after taking the view that the body of evidence was insufficient to support a conviction, the judge deemed the evidence sufficient to convict him of the two rapes; the player's defense already announced that they will appeal from the decision.

== Career statistics ==
As of 10 November 2026

Club	Season	League			State League		Cup		Continental		Other		Total	
Club	Season	Division	Apps	Goals	Apps	Goals	Apps	Goals	Apps	Goals	Apps	Goals	Apps	Goals
Athletico Paranaense	2025	Série B	15	1	4	0	3	0	—		—		22	1
Athletico Paranaense	2026	Série A	12	0	3	0	3	0	—		3 (Note: Appearance(s) in Copa Paraná)	0	21	0
Total			27	1	7	0	6	0	0	0	3	0	43	1
