= Kevin Viveros =

Colombian footballer (born 2000)

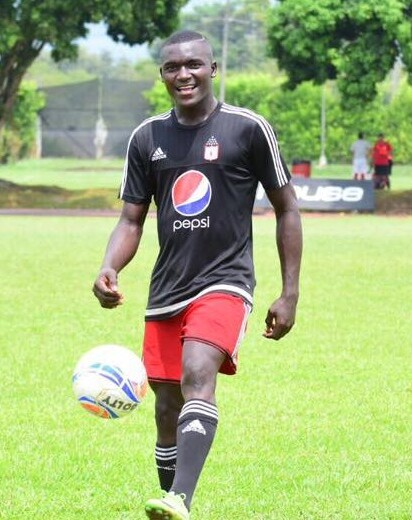
- Viveros with América de Cali in 2017

Personal information
- Full name: Kevin Stiven Viveros Rodallega
- Date of birth: 26 April 2000 (age 26)
- Place of birth: Buenaventura, Colombia
- Height: 1.80 m (5 ft 11 in)
- Position: Right winger

Team information
- Current team: Athletico Paranaense
- Number: 9

Youth career
- –2019: América de Cali

Senior career*
Years	Team	Apps	(Gls)
2018–2021	América de Cali	17	(0)
2019	→ Atlético Cali (loan)	14	(3)
2020	→ Leones (loan)	10	(1)
2022–2023	Carabobo	34	(21)
2023	→ Deportivo Cali (loan)	19	(4)
2023–2025	Sarajevo	0	(0)
2024	→ La Equidad (loan)	21	(8)
2024–2025	→ Atlético Nacional (loan)	44	(9)
2025	Atlético Nacional	0	(0)
2025–	Athletico Paranaense	55	(30)

International career^{‡}
2026–	Colombia	3	(0)
- * Club domestic league appearances and goals as of 15:43, 10 November 2026 (UTC) ‡ National team caps and goals as of 6 October 2026

Kevin Stiven Viveros Rodallega (born 26 April 2000) is a Colombian professional footballer who plays as right winger for Brazilian club Athletico Paranaense and the Colombia national team.

== Club career ==
=== Deportivo Cali ===
In January 2023, Viveros signed for Colombian club Deportivo Cali on a loan transfer from Carabobo.

=== Sarajevo ===
On 30 June 2023, Viveros signed for Bosnian club Sarajevo.

=== La Equidad ===
At the end of November 2023, Sarajevo made an agreement with Colombian team La Equidad to loan Viveros with option to buy him at the end of the season.

=== Atlético Nacional ===
On 11 July 2024, Viveros signed for Colombian club Atlético Nacional on a loan transfer from Sarajevo. On 8 May 2025, he scored twice in a 3-1 Copa Libertadores victory against Internacional.

== International career ==
On 26 September 2026, Viveros made his debut for the Colombia national team in a friendly against Mexico.

== Career statistics ==
=== Club ===
As of 10 November 2026

Appearances and goals by club, season and competition
Club	Season	League			National cup (Note: Includes Copa Colombia, Bosnian Cup)		Continental		State league (Note: Includes Campeonato Paranaense)		Other		Total	
Club	Season	Division	Apps	Goals	Apps	Goals	Apps	Goals	Apps	Goals	Apps	Goals	Apps	Goals
América de Cali	2018	Liga DIMAYOR	7	0	1	0	0	0	—		—		8	0
América de Cali	2019	Liga DIMAYOR	10	0	4	0	—		—		—		14	0
América de Cali	2020	Liga DIMAYOR	0	0	0	0	—		—		—		0	0
América de Cali	Total		17	0	5	0	—		—		—		22	0
Atlético Cali (loan)	2019	Categoría Primera B	14	3	0	0	—		—		—		14	3
Leones (loan)	2020	Categoría Primera B	10	1	4	1	—		—		—		14	2
Carabobo	2022	Liga FUTVE	34	21	0	0	—		—		—		34	21
Deportivo Cali (loan)	2023	Liga DIMAYOR	19	4	4	3	—		—		—		23	7
Sarajevo	2023–24	Bosnian Premier League	0	0	0	0	1 (Note: Appearance in UEFA Europa Conference League)	0	—		—		1	0
La Equidad (loan)	2024	Liga DIMAYOR	21	8	0	0	—		—		—		21	8
Atlético Nacional (loan)	2024	Liga DIMAYOR	24	3	8	1	—		—		—		32	4
Atlético Nacional (loan)	2025	Liga DIMAYOR	20	6	0	0	5 (Note: Appearances in Copa Libertadores)	4	—		2 (Note: Appearances in Superliga Colombiana)	0	27	10
Atlético Nacional (loan)	Total		44	9	8	1	5	4	—		2	0	59	14
Athletico Paranaense	2025	Série B	21	9	4	1	—		—		—		25	10
Athletico Paranaense	2026	Série A	32	21	4	0	—		2	1	—		38	22
Athletico Paranaense	Total		53	30	8	1	—		2	1	—		63	32
Career total			212	76	29	6	6	4	2	1	2	0	251	87

=== International ===
As of match played 6 October 2026

Appearances and goals by national team and year
National team	Year	Apps	Goals
Colombia	2026	3	0
Total		3	0

== Honours ==
Atlético Nacional

- Liga DIMAYOR: 2024
- Copa Colombia: 2024
