= Gilberto (footballer, born 2005) =

Brazilian footballer

Personal information
- Full name: Gilberto Junior Leite dos Santos
- Date of birth: 27 March 2005 (age 21)
- Place of birth: São Paulo, Brazil
- Height: 1.65 m (5 ft 5 in)
- Position: Right-back

Team information
- Current team: Athletico Paranaense (on loan from Palmeiras)
- Number: 2

Youth career
- 2017–2025: Palmeiras

Senior career*
Years	Team	Apps	(Gls)
2026–	Palmeiras	0	(0)
2026–	→ Athletico Paranaense (loan)	17	(0)

International career
2025	Brazil U20	2	(0)
- * Club domestic league appearances and goals as of 15:22, 10 November 2026 (UTC)

Gilberto Junior Leite dos Santos (born 27 March 2005), known as Gilberto Junior or just Gilberto, is a Brazilian footballer who plays as a right-back for Athletico Paranaense, on loan from Palmeiras.

== Club career ==
Born in São Paulo, Gilberto joined Palmeiras' youth sides in 2017, aged 12. In March 2024, he renewed his contract with the club until March 2026.

On 23 April 2025, already established in the under-20 team, Gilberto further extended his link with Verdão until December 2027. On 27 December, he was loaned to fellow Série A side Athletico Paranaense for one year.

Regularly used during the 2026 Campeonato Paranaense, Gilberto made his top tier debut on 22 March 2026, coming on as a second-half substitute for Lucas Esquivel in a 2–0 home win over rivals Coritiba.

== International career ==
Gilberto was called up to the Brazil national under-20 team for the 2025 FIFA U-20 World Cup,

== Career statistics ==
As of 10 November 2026

Club	Season	League			State League		Cup		Continental		Other		Total	
Club	Season	Division	Apps	Goals	Apps	Goals	Apps	Goals	Apps	Goals	Apps	Goals	Apps	Goals
Athletico Paranaense	2026	Série A	8	0	9	0	1	0	—		—		18	0
Total			8	0	9	0	1	0	0	0	0	0	18	0
