= Mateo Gamarra =

Paraguayan footballer (born 2000)

Personal information
- Full name: Mateo Gamarra González
- Date of birth: 20 October 2000 (age 26)
- Place of birth: Concepción, Paraguay
- Height: 1.80 m (5 ft 11 in)
- Positions: Centre back; left back

Team information
- Current team: Olimpia (on loan from Athletico)
- Number: 14

Youth career
- 2016–2019: Independiente FBC

Senior career*
Years	Team	Apps	(Gls)
2018–2021	Independiente FBC	1	(0)
2020	→ 12 de Octubre (loan)	8	(0)
2021	→ Olimpia (loan)	6	(0)
2022–2023	Olimpia	70	(4)
2024–	Athletico Paranaense	30	(1)
2025	→ Cruzeiro (loan)	2	(0)
2026	→ Olimpia (loan)	34	(4)

International career^{‡}
2022–	Paraguay	4	(0)
- * Club domestic league appearances and goals as of 15 November 2026 ‡ National team caps and goals as of 15 November 2026

Mateo Gamarra González (born 20 October 2000) is a Paraguayan professional footballer who plays as a Centre Back or Left Back for Olimpia, on loan from Athletico, and the Paraguay national team.

== Club career ==
Born in Concepción, he joined Independiente F.B.C. at the age of 15. Playing as a central defender Gamarra had a breakthrough in 2022 featuring for Club Olimpia regularly in the league, Copa Libertadores and Copa Sudamericana. He won his first silverware with Olimpia when the club clinched the 2022 Clausura tournament.

On 19 December 2023, Gamarra moved abroad for the first time in his career, after signing a four-year contract with Campeonato Brasileiro Série A side Athletico Paranaense.

On 14 February 2025, Gamarra was loaned to Cruzeiro until the end of the year.

== International career ==
On 1 September 2022, Gamarra made his debut for the Paraguay against Mexico.

== Personal life ==
One of 14 children born to Vidalia González, his father died when Gamarra was a teenager. Gamarra worked as a painter during the COVID-19 pandemic and football was suspended, in order to provide extra income for his family. Gamarra has organised friendly football matches in his hometown to raise money for local charity causes.
