= Club Athletico Paranaense =

Brazilian professional football club

Athletico Paranaense
- Full name: Club Athletico Paranaense
- Nicknames: Furacão (Hurricane); Rubro-Negro (Red and Black); El Paranaense (The Paranaense)
- Founded: 26 March 1924; 102 years ago
- Ground: Arena da Baixada
- Capacity: 42,372
- President: Mario Celso Petraglia
- Manager: Odair Hellmann
- League: Campeonato Brasileiro Série A Campeonato Paranaense
- 2025 2025: Série B, 2nd of 20 (promoted); Paranaense, 4th of 12
- Website: athletico.com.br
Home colours	Away colours	Third colours

Club Athletico Paranaense (CAP) is a Brazilian professional football club based in Curitiba, Paraná. Founded on 26 March 1924, they play their home matches at the Arena da Baixada, which holds 42,372 spectators. They currently compete in the Campeonato Paranaense, the state of Paraná's premier state league, and in the Campeonato Brasileiro Série A, the Brazilian top-tier league.

Athletico Paranaense is one of the major forces in Paraná, having won the state league 28 times. At the national level, it won the Campeonato Brasileiro Série A in 2001 and the Copa do Brasil in 2019. At the continental level, the club won the Copa Sudamericana in 2018 and 2021, and finished as runner-up in the Copa Libertadores in 2005 and 2022.

They are considered one of the strongest teams in Brazil outside of the Big Twelve, at times even surpassing them. Its main rival is Coritiba FC, against whom it plays the Athletiba derby.

== History ==
=== Foundation ===
Club Athletico Paranaense traces its roots to the 1912 founding of the International Football Club and the 1914 founding of the América Futebol Clube, two traditional Curitiba clubs. The clubs merged in 26 March 1924 100 years ago to form CAP. The club's first match, a friendly one, was played on 6 April, when Athletico Paranaense beat Universal FC 4–2. The following year, Athletico Paranaense won its first title, the Campeonato Paranaense. In 1929 it won its second state title, before adding a third and the club's first back to back championship.

=== 1980s and 1990s: ups and downs ===
In the 1983 Serie A, Athletico had a great season, finishing fourth in the league. However, the club struggled in the 1986 and 1988 seasons, which eventually culminated in the club's relegation to the Série B for the first time in history in 1989. In the 1990 season they made the second division finals, losing to Sport Recife due to Sport having a better season record, after a draw on aggregate. Despite the loss, they still earned promotion to the 1991 Série A, where they struggled but ultimately earned their permanence in the top flight for the following season.

The 1992 season was slightly better, with the club finishing fifteenth in the Serie A. However, the following season was worse, with the club suffering another relegation, their second in four years. In the 1994 Série B, the club was eliminated in the third stage and was not promoted. In the 1995 Série B, Athletico won their first major title in history, the second division title, and was promoted to the 1996 Serie A. Back in the top flight, Furacão had a good campaign, finishing fourth in the regular season and qualifying to the quarter finals.

In 1999, the club inaugurated their new stadium, Arena da Baixada, which was built on the same ground as their old stadium. Also that year, Athletico won a Pre-Libertadores tournament, which was only played in 1999, due to CONMEBOL expanding the tournament from 24 to 32 teams, so Brazil's fifth place had to be defined. Athletico beat powerhouses Internacional, Sao Paulo, and then Cruzeiro in the finals to earn their first Libertadores participation in history.

=== 2000–2006: First league title and Continental campaigns ===
In the 2000 Copa Libertadores, the club began their campaign in excellent form, topping their group undefeated, with their only draw coming against Nacional; they also won their first match on 16 February 2000, a 3–0 victory in Peru against Alianza Lima. Expectations were high for the knockout rounds, with Athletico being the #2 seed in the competition behind Colombian champions América de Cali; however, Furacão was eliminated by fellow Brazilians Atletico Mineiro in the knockout stage, losing on penalties after a 2–2 draw on aggregate.

In 2001, Athletico won their first Série A title, beating São Caetano 5–2 on aggregate in the finals. As champions, they gained automatic qualification to the 2002 Copa Libertadores. Expectations were high for the club as champions, and the team was looking to build off of its Libertadores campaign in 2000 where it reached the knockout stages; however, things were worse in the 2002 edition, and the team finished last in their group with only one win, including a heavy 5–0 defeat to America de Cali.

In 2004, Athletico finished second in the Série A, battling it out with champions Santos until the last matchday. This position qualified the club for the 2005 Copa Libertadores. Their 2005 Libertadores campaign was very different from the first two; the club qualified for the knockout stages as second in its group, behind Colombian champions Independiente Medellín, who Athletico had lost to 4–0 in Curitiba. In the round of 16, Athletico disposed of Paraguayan club Cerro Porteño on away goals, qualifying to the last eight of the competition for the first time in club history. In the quarter-finals, they were faced with Serie A and 2003 Libertadores champions Santos. Athletico won the first leg at home 3–2, then won 2–0 in São Paulo to progress to the semi-finals. In the semi-finals they were faced with Mexican club Chivas Guadalajara, who had eliminated powerhouse Boca Juniors 4–0 on aggregate. Chivas was no match for Athletico, with the Brazilian club winning 3–0 at home, then tying 2–2 on Mexican soil to progress to the final with a 5–2 aggregate score. The finals were played against powerhouse São Paulo, who had numerous international trophies already. The first leg at Arena da Baixada ended in a 1-1 draw. However, the second leg was a completely different story, with Sao Paulo thrashing Athletico 4–0 and denying Athletico their first Copa Libertadores title.

In the 2005 Serie A, Athletico was able to maintain enough squad depth to have a good performance in the league, finishing sixth and qualifying for their first Copa Sudamericana. Their campaign began with a 4-1 aggregate victory against fellow Paranaense club Paraná. In the following round, they eliminated powerhouse River Plate 3-2 on aggregate, then eliminated Uruguayan club Nacional, 6-2 on aggregate, with a 4-1 victory in the second leg, to reach the semi-finals. The semi-finals, played against Mexican club Pachuca, began with a shock 1-0 victory by the Mexican club on Brazilian soil. The second leg began with Athletico up 1-0 at halftime with a goal by Colombian midfielder David Ferreira to tie the aggregate score; however, Pachuca scored four goals in the second half to win the game 4-1 and eliminate the Brazilians from their first Copa Sudamericana.

=== 2007–2012: Decline and relegation ===
This elimination had a considerable effect on the club's near future; Athletico finished out of the top 10 spots in the league from 2006 to 2009, which included a 6-2 loss on aggregate to Vasco da Gama in the first round of the 2007 Copa Sudamericana, a first round elimination at the hands of Corinthians Alagoano in the 2008 Copa do Brasil, and elimination from the 2008 Copa Sudamericana by Guadalajara. In 2007, the team partnered with Major League Soccer club Dallas.

In 2010 the club had a good season and finished fifth, but the club suffered relegation in 2011 after a seventeenth placed finish in the league. The fifth placed finish in 2010 had qualified the club for the 2011 Copa Sudamericana, but they were eliminated in the first round by Flamengo. In 2012 the team gained immediate promotion back to the Serie A. In 2010 the club announced a partnership with Vitesse Arnhem in the Netherlands.

=== 2013–present: New heights, first major titles and continental success ===
For 2013 the team was completely rebuilt and came back into the top flight as a powerful team; the club finished third in the Serie A, qualified for the 2014 Copa Libertadores, and finished runner up to Flamengo in the 2013 Copa do Brasil.

On 15 February 2015, the club signed Indian winger Romeo Fernandes on loan from Dempo and through this contract he became the first and only Indian footballer to play in a South American top-tier league. Zico, then FC Goa coach played a key role behind this contract.

In 2018, Athletico Paranaense won their first Copa Sudamericana title, defeating Colombian champions Junior in the finals after a penalty shootout.

On 22 May 2019, Athletico won the first leg of the 2019 Recopa Sudamericana against 2018 Libertadores champion River Plate with the only goal of the match being scored by Marco Ruben. In the second leg at Estadio Monumental, River was leading 1–0 until the 90th minute and it looked like the match was heading for a penalty shootout; however, River scored two goals in injury time to win 3–0 and lift the Recopa title 3–1 on aggregate. In September 2019, the club won its first Copa do Brasil title, beating Internacional twice in the final.

In 2021, they won their second Sudamericana title, beating fellow Brazilians Red Bull Bragantino 1–0 in the final.

In 2022, Athletico Paranaense reached the Copa Libertadores final for the second time in club history, where they were defeated by Flamengo.

== Logos ==
Logos

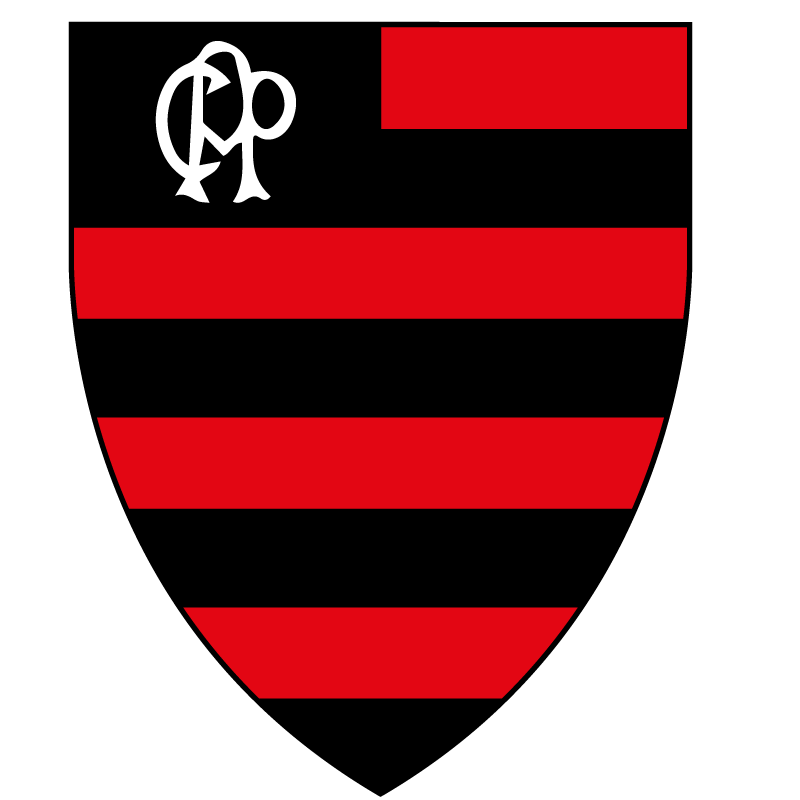
1924–1934

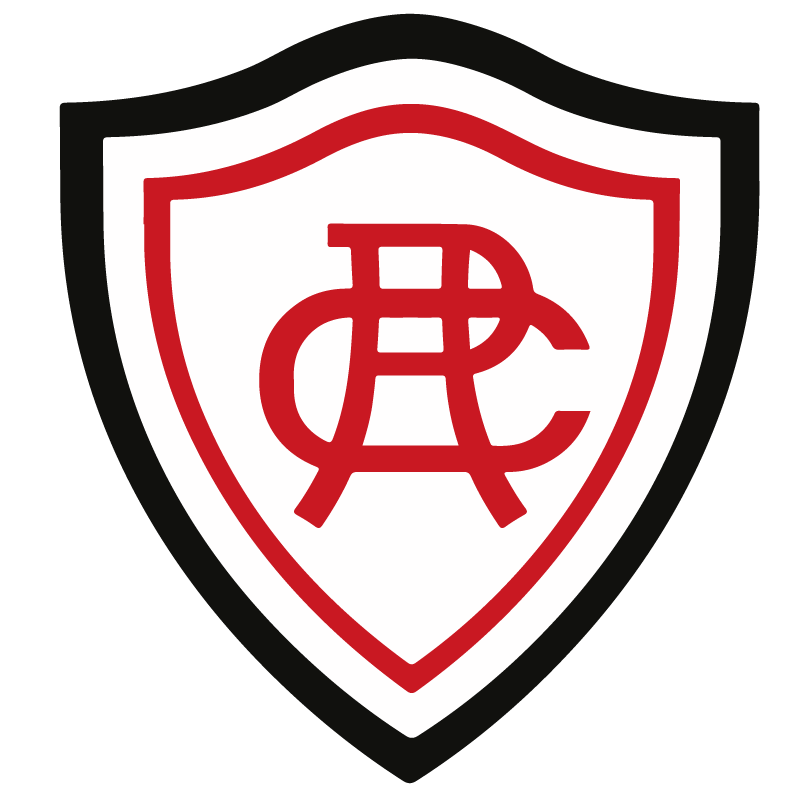
1934

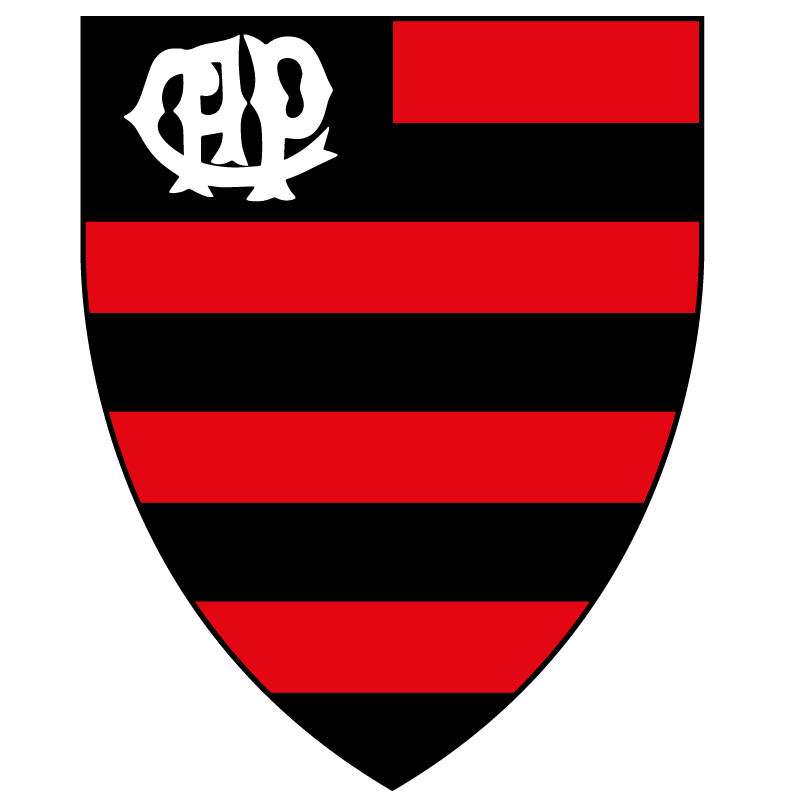
1934–1988

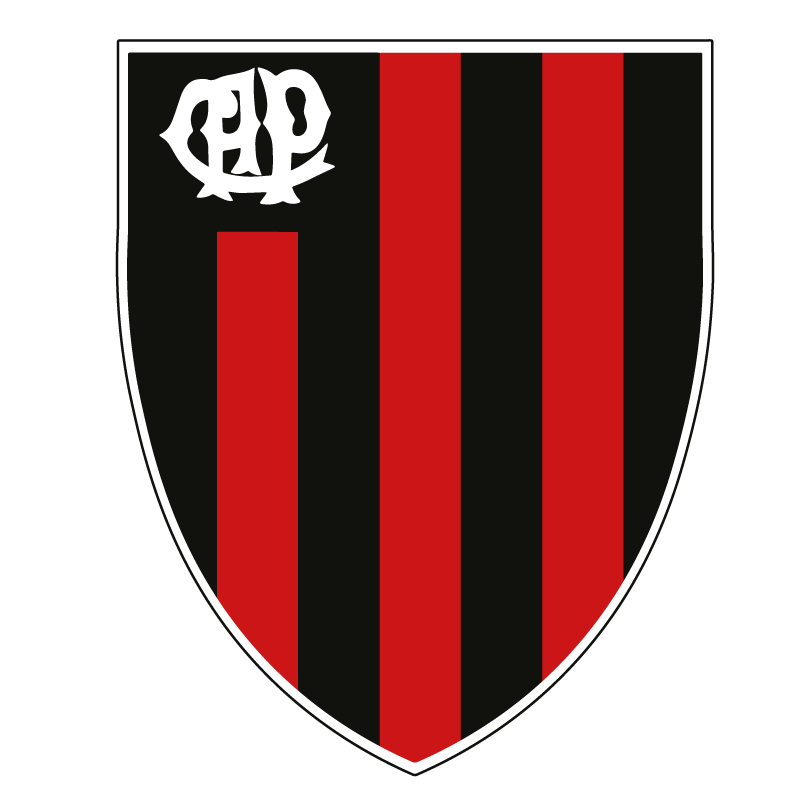
1989–1996

1997–2001

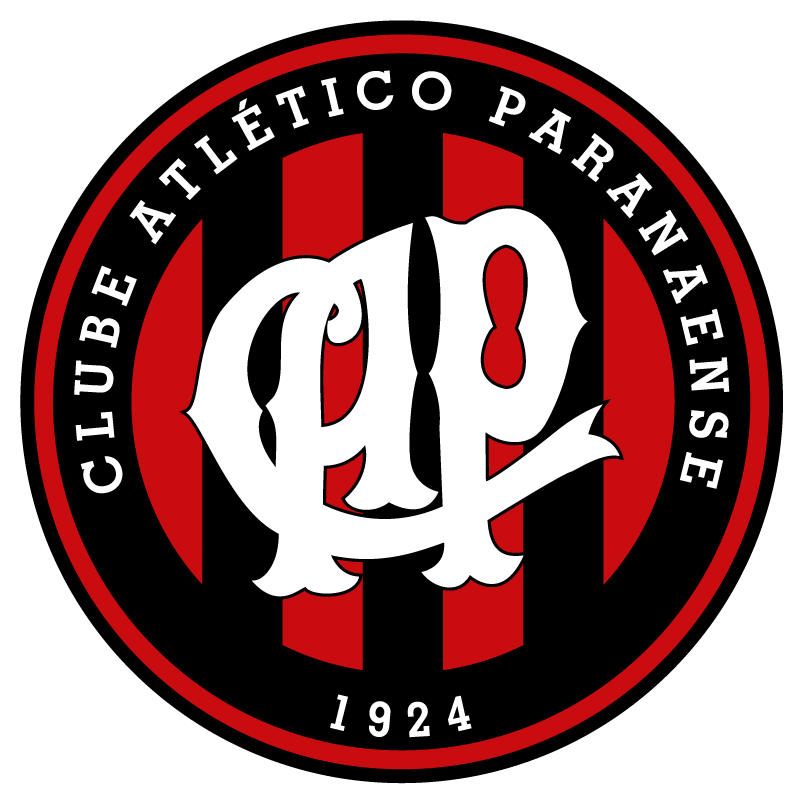
2002–2018

2019–...

== Supporters ==
A survey taken in 2005 by Paraná Pesquisas Institute showed that Athletico Paranaense has the largest number of supporters in Curitiba.

== Team colors and uniform ==
Originally in 1924 Athletico used to play using a horizontally striped in red and black shirt, along with white shorts and red and black socks.

In 1989 Athletico's administrators wanted to differentiate the team's uniform from the other red and black teams in Brazil (mainly Flamengo, Sport Recife and Vitória), so they changed the home shirt to be vertically striped in red and black (the team kept playing with white socks and white shorts). In 1996 Athletico changed the color of the socks and the shorts from white to black.

In December 2018, Athletico's administrators changed the club's crest to be four alternating red and black diagonal stripes which decreased in size from top to bottom, resembling a hurricane, echoing the club's nickname. The club also changed their name from 'Clube Atlético Paranaense' to its original name in the Portuguese orthography when it was founded, 'Club Athletico Paranaense', which some believe to be a move in order to further differentiate themselves from Atlético Mineiro, another prominent Brazilian club. The club also changed the kits: the home kit, which had been a red and black vertically striped shirt, black shorts and black socks for twenty-two years became a predominantly red shirt, with a black collar, and the four diagonal stripes from the crest enlarged and going across both the front and back of the lower third of the shirt in black. The shorts and socks remain black. The away strip released with this kit was a white shirt with a black collar. In place of the four diagonal stripes were eight thin diagonal lines in the place of the outline of the larger ones seen on the home shirt; these too were black. The shorts and socks were white.

=== Sponsors ===
The English brand Umbro has been the club's kit supplier since 1997. This partnership is recognized as the longest-standing in Brazilian football.

The team's kit sponsor is the international betting brand Betsson starting from the 2022-2023 season. This came after a sponsorship with EstrelaBet was abandoned after only four days.

== Stadium ==
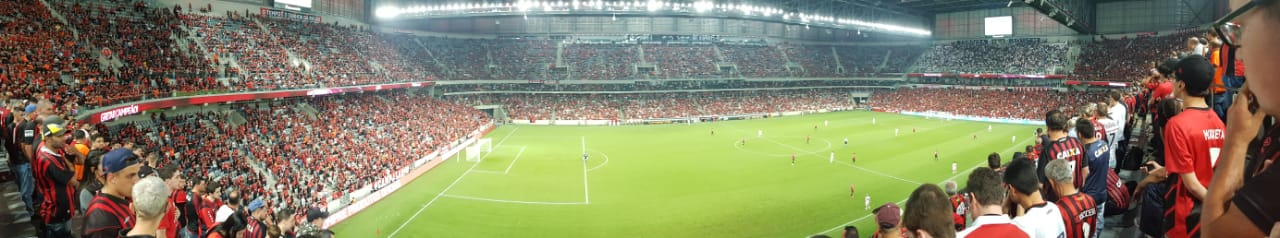
Arena da Baixada in 2019.

The home stadium is the Estádio Joaquim Américo Guimarães, built in 1914 and renovated several times is traditionally known as Arena da Baixada, or Ligga Arena for sponsorship reasons because of the sponsorship by Ligga. Besides hosting important club games, Arena da Baixada also hosted 4 World Cup games in 2014 and other events like the 2017 FIVB Volleyball World League, the UFC 198: Werdum vs. Miocic and many music concerts. Arena da Baixada is also the only stadium in South America with a retractable roof and was the first to use artificial turf (with FIFA approval).

== Partnerships ==
- (United States) Orlando City SC (MLS) – The technical partnership connects City with a club with a training facility and one of Brazil's academies.
- All India Football Federation (AIFF) – On 13 November 2014, Paranaense signed a partnership with AIFF, the governing body of Indian football, on a contract lasting till the end of 2015. The idea was presented by Technical director Rob Baan. Its main motive would be to help India for "development of a strong Indian side in the 2017 FIFA U-17 World Cup.
- (Japan) Cerezo Osaka
- (Indonesia) Bali United

== Current squad ==
=== First team ===
As of 22 September 2026

Note: Flags indicate national team as defined under FIFA eligibility rules; some limited exceptions apply. Players may hold more than one non-FIFA nationality.

No.	Pos.	Nation	Player
1	GK	BRA	Mycael
2	DF	BRA	Gilberto dos Santos (on loan from Palmeiras)
3	DF	BRA	Léo Pelé
4	DF	BRA	Arthur Dias
5	MF	BRA	Felipinho
6	DF	BRA	Léo Derik
7	FW	COL	Stiven Mendoza
8	MF	BRA	João Cruz
9	FW	COL	Kevin Viveros
10	MF	ARG	Bruno Zapelli
12	DF	BRA	Gilberto Moraes
14	MF	BRA	Luiz Gustavo
16	MF	BRA	Jadson
17	MF	COL	Alejandro García
18	FW	COL	Kerwin Vargas
19	FW	COL	Jorge Rivaldo

No.	Pos.	Nation	Player
21	FW	BRA	Leozinho
22	DF	COL	Carlos Terán
23	GK	BRA	Santos (captain; on loan from Fortaleza)
25	DF	BRA	Dantas (on loan from Novorizontino)
26	DF	BRA	Claudinho
27	MF	COL	Juan Portilla
29	DF	ARG	Gastón Benavídez
33	DF	COL	Juan Felipe Aguirre
37	DF	ARG	Lucas Esquivel
42	GK	BRA	Matheus Soares
47	FW	BRA	Felipe Chiqueti
50	FW	BRA	Renan Viana
53	MF	BRA	Dudu Kogitzki
63	MF	BRA	Riquelme
70	FW	BRA	Renan Peixoto

=== Youth team ===
Note: Flags indicate national team as defined under FIFA eligibility rules; some limited exceptions apply. Players may hold more than one non-FIFA nationality.

No.	Pos.	Nation	Player
15	DF	BRA	Kauan Alemão (on loan from Novorizontino)
36	DF	BRA	Arthur Monteiro
41	DF	BRA	Vitinho
43	FW	BRA	Kayke Ayrton
46	DF	BRA	Marcos André

No.	Pos.	Nation	Player
55	DF	BRA	Bruno Baldini
73	FW	USA	Rikelme
76	GK	UKR	Maksym Voronov
80	GK	BRA	Carlos Eduardo

=== Out on loan ===
Note: Flags indicate national team as defined under FIFA eligibility rules; some limited exceptions apply. Players may hold more than one non-FIFA nationality.

No.	Pos.	Nation	Player
—	DF	PAR	Mateo Gamarra (at Olimpia until 31 December 2026)
—	DF	BRA	Habraão (at Sport Recife until 30 November 2026)
—	DF	COL	Hayen Palacios (at Independiente Medellín until 31 December 2026)
—	MF	BRA	Raul (at Cuiabá 30 November 2026)

No.	Pos.	Nation	Player
—	FW	PAR	Romeo Benítez (at Olimpia until 30 June 2027)
—	FW	BRA	Isaac (at Maccabi Netanya until 30 June 2027)
—	FW	BRA	Walace França (at Gil Vicente until 30 June 2027)
—	FW	URU	Gonzalo Mastriani (at América Mineiro until 30 November 2026)

== Personnel ==
=== Current technical staff ===
Role	Name
Head coach	(Brazil) Odair Hellmann
Assistant coach	(Brazil) Fábio Moreno
Fitness coach	(Brazil) Anderson Nicolau
Goalkeeping coach	(Brazil) Felipe Faria
Analyst	(Brazil) Guilherme Vaz

- Last updated: 10 November 2026

=== Management ===
Position	Staff
President	Mario Celso Petraglia
1st Vice-president	Luiz Alberto Küster
2nd Vice-president	José Lucio Glomb

- Last updated: 26 July 2024

== Honours ==
=== Official tournaments ===
Continental
Competitions	Titles	Seasons
Copa Sudamericana	2	2018, 2021
International
Competitions	Titles	Seasons
Levain Cup-Sudamericana	1	2019
National
Competitions	Titles	Seasons
Campeonato Brasileiro Série A	1	2001
Copa do Brasil	1	2019
Campeonato Brasileiro Série B	1	1995
Seletiva Libertadores	1	1999
State
Competitions	Titles	Seasons
Campeonato Paranaense	28	1925, 1929, 1930, 1934, 1936, 1940, 1943, 1945, 1949, 1958, 1970, 1982, 1983, 1985, 1988, 1990, 1998, 2000, 2001, 2002 (S), 2005, 2009, 2016, 2018, 2019, 2020, 2023, 2024
Copa Paraná	3	1998, 2003, 2026

- record
- (S) Supercampeonato

=== Others tournaments ===
==== International ====
- Torneio Internacional Afro-Brasileiro (1): 1974
- Schützi-Cup Tournament (2): 1991, 1992
- Shaka Hislop Cup Tournament (1): 2007
- Challenger Brazil/USA (2): 2007, 2009
- Marbella Cup (1): 2013

==== National ====
- Torneio Triangular Paraná-São Paulo (1): 1969
- Torneio Interestadual do Couto Pereira (1): 1977
- Torneio Cidade de Londrina (1): 2010

==== State ====
- Torneio Relâmpago (1): 1946
- Troféu Primeira Hora (1): 2001
- Taça Caio Junior (1): 2018
- Taça Dirceu Krüger (1): 2019
- Taça dos Campeões (1): 2025
- Torneio Início do Paraná (6): 1936, 1947, 1955, 1958, 1987, 1988

==== City ====
- Liga Curitibana (5): 1929, 1930, 1934, 1936, 1940
- Torneio Encerramento da Liga Curitibana (1): 1935
- Torneio Início da Liga Curitibana (1): 1936

=== Runners-up ===
- Copa Libertadores (2): 2005, 2022
- Recopa Sudamericana (2): 2019, 2022
- Campeonato Brasileiro Série A (1): 2004
- Copa do Brasil (2): 2013, 2021
- Supercopa do Brasil (1): 2020
- Campeonato Brasileiro Série B (2): 1990, 2025
- Copa Sul-Minas (1): 2002
- Campeonato Paranaense (19): 1926, 1927, 1928, 1948, 1968, 1972, 1973, 1974, 1978, 1987, 1991, 1997, 2004, 2008, 2010, 2011, 2012, 2013, 2017

=== Youth team ===
- Taça Belo Horizonte de Juniores (2): 1996, 2006
- Copa Votorantim Sub-15 (1): 2007

=== Women's Football ===
- Campeonato Paranaense de Futebol Feminino (5): 2020, 2021, 2022, 2023, 2024

== History in competitions ==
Winner	Runners-up	Third place	Relegation

Brazilian League
Year		1971	1972	1973	1974	1975	1976	1977	1978	1979
Pos.		*	*	28th	9th	28th	29th	44th	62nd	11th
Year	1980	1981	1982	1983	1984	1985	1986	1987	1988	1989
Pos.	*	*	32nd	4th	11th	*	18th	20th	19th	18th
Year	1990	1991	1992	1993	1994	1995	1996	1997	1998	1999
Pos.	*	17th	15th	24th	*	*	8th	12th	16th	9th
Year	2000	2001	2002	2003	2004	2005	2006	2007	2008	2009
Pos.	13th	1st	14th	12th	2nd	6th	13th	12th	13th	14th
Year	2010	2011	2012	2013	2014	2015	2016	2017	2018	2019
Pos.	5th	17th	*	3rd	8th	10th	6th	11th	7th	5th
Year	2020	2021	2022	2023	2024	2025
Pos.	9th	14th	6th	8th	17th	*

Brazilian Cup
Year										1989
Pos.										*
Year	1990	1991	1992	1993	1994	1995	1996	1997	1998	1999
Pos.	*	1R	QF	*	*	*	*	QF	*	QF
Year	2000	2001	2002	2003	2004	2005	2006	2007	2008	2009
Pos.	R16	QF	*	2R	*	*	2R	QF	1R	R16
Year	2010	2011	2012	2013	2014	2015	2016	2017	2018	2019
Pos.	R16	QF	QF	RU	R16	2R	R16	QF	R16	W
Year	2020	2021	2022	2023	2024	2025	2026
Pos.	R16	RU	QF	QF	QF	QF	R16

Copa Libertadores
Year	2000	2002	2005	2014	2017	2019	2020	2022	2023
Pos.	R16	GS	RU	GS	R16	R16	R16	RU	R16

Copa Sudamericana
Year	2006	2007	2008	2009	2011	2015	2018	2021	2024
Pos.	SF	2R	R16	1R	2R	QF	W	W	QF

(*): Did not participate

=== South American Record ===
As of match played 27 September 2024

Competition	Played	Won	Drew	Lost	GF	GA	GD	Win%
Copa Libertadores	85	40	15	30	118	106	+12	47.06
Copa Sudamericana	61	36	9	16	97	54	+43	59.02
Recopa Sudamericana	4	1	1	2	3	7	−4	25.00
Total	150	77	25	48	218	167	+51	51.33

Season	Competition	Round	Opponents	Home	Away	Aggregate
2000	Copa Libertadores					
2000	Copa Libertadores	Group 1	(Peru) Alianza Lima	2–1	3-0	1st
2000	Copa Libertadores	Group 1	(Ecuador) Emelec	1-0	0-0	1st
2000	Copa Libertadores	Group 1	(Uruguay) Nacional	2-0	3-1	1st
2000	Copa Libertadores	R16	(Brazil) Atlético Mineiro	2–1	0-1	2–2 (3-5p)
2002	Copa Libertadores					
2002	Copa Libertadores	Group 4	(Colombia) América de Cali	0-0	0-5	4th
2002	Copa Libertadores	Group 4	(Ecuador) Olmedo	2-1	0-2	4th
2002	Copa Libertadores	Group 4	(Bolivia) Bolivar	1-2	5-5	4th
2005	Copa Libertadores					
2005	Copa Libertadores	Group 1	(Colombia) Independiente Medellín	0-4	2-2	2nd
2005	Copa Libertadores	Group 1	(Colombia) América de Cali	2-1	1-3	2nd
2005	Copa Libertadores	Group 1	(Paraguay) Libertad	1-0	2-1	2nd
2005	Copa Libertadores	R16	(Paraguay) Cerro Porteño	2-1	1-2	2–2 (5-4p)
2005	Copa Libertadores	QF	(Brazil) Santos	3-2	2-0	5-2
2005	Copa Libertadores	SF	(Mexico) Chivas Guadalajara	3-0	2-2	5-2
2005	Copa Libertadores	F	(Brazil) São Paulo	1-1	0-4	1-5
2006	Copa Sudamericana					
2006	Copa Sudamericana	2R	(Brazil) Paraná	1-0	3-1	4-1
2006	Copa Sudamericana	R16	(Argentina) River Plate	2-2	1-0	3-2
2006	Copa Sudamericana	QF	(Uruguay) Nacional	2-1	4-1	6-2
2006	Copa Sudamericana	SF	(Mexico) Pachuca	0-1	1-4	1-5
2007	Copa Sudamericana	2R	(Brazil) Vasco da Gama	2-4	0-2	2-6
2008	Copa Sudamericana					
2008	Copa Sudamericana	1R	(Brazil) São Paulo	0-0	0-0	0-0 (4-3p)
2008	Copa Sudamericana	R16	(Mexico) Chivas Guadalajara	3-4	2-2	5-6
2009	Copa Sudamericana	1R	(Brazil) Botafogo	0-0	2-3	2-3
2011	Copa Sudamericana	2R	(Brazil) Flamengo	0-1	0-1	0-2
2014	Copa Libertadores					
2014	Copa Libertadores	1R	(Peru) Sporting Cristal	2-1	1-2	3-3 (5-4p)
2014	Copa Libertadores	Group 1	(Argentina) Vélez Sarsfield	1-3	0-2	3rd
2014	Copa Libertadores	Group 1	(Bolivia) The Strongest	1-0	1-2	3rd
2014	Copa Libertadores	Group 1	(Peru) Universitario	3-0	1-0	3rd
2015	Copa Sudamericana					
2015	Copa Sudamericana	2R	(Brazil) Joinville	2-0	1-0	3-0
2015	Copa Sudamericana	R16	(Brazil) Brasília	1-0	0-0	1-0
2015	Copa Sudamericana	QF	(Paraguay) Sportivo Luqueño	1-0	0-2	1-2
2017	Copa Libertadores					
2017	Copa Libertadores	2R	(Colombia) Millonarios	1-0	0-1	1-1 (4-2p)
2017	Copa Libertadores	3R	(Paraguay) Deportivo Capiatá	3-3	1-0	4-3
2017	Copa Libertadores	Group 4	(Argentina) San Lorenzo	0-3	1-0	2nd
2017	Copa Libertadores	Group 4	(Brazil) Flamengo	2-1	1-2	2nd
2017	Copa Libertadores	Group 4	(Chile) Universidad Católica	2-2	3-2	2nd
2017	Copa Libertadores	R16	(Brazil) Santos	2-3	0-1	2-4
2018	Copa Sudamericana					
2018	Copa Sudamericana	1R	(Argentina) Newell's Old Boys	3-0	1-2	4-2
2018	Copa Sudamericana	2R	(Uruguay) Peñarol	2-0	4-1	6-1
2018	Copa Sudamericana	R16	(Venezuela) Caracas	2-1	2-0	4-2
2018	Copa Sudamericana	QF	(Brazil) Bahia	0-1	1-0	1-1 (4-1p)
2018	Copa Sudamericana	SF	(Brazil) Fluminense	2-0	2-0	4-0
2018	Copa Sudamericana	F	(Colombia) Junior Barranquilla	1-1	1-1	2-2 (4-3p)
2019	Recopa Sudamericana	F	(Argentina) River Plate	1-0	0-3	1-3
2019	2019 Copa Libertadores	Group G	(Argentina) Boca Juniors	3-0	1-2	2nd
2019	2019 Copa Libertadores	Group G	(Colombia) Tolima	1-0	0-1	2nd
2019	2019 Copa Libertadores	Group G	(Bolivia) Jorge Wilstermann	4-0	2-3	2nd
2019	2019 Copa Libertadores	R16	(Argentina) Boca Juniors	0-1	0-2	0-3
2020	Copa Libertadores					
2020	Copa Libertadores	Group C	(Bolivia) Jorge Wilstermann	0-0	3-2	2nd
2020	Copa Libertadores	Group C	(Chile) Colo-Colo	2-0	0-1	2nd
2020	Copa Libertadores	Group C	(Uruguay) Peñarol	1-0	2-3	2nd
2020	Copa Libertadores	R16	(Argentina) River Plate	1-1	0-1	1-2
2021	Copa Sudamericana					
2021	Copa Sudamericana	Group D	(Peru) Melgar	1-0	0-1	1st
2021	Copa Sudamericana	Group D	(Ecuador) Aucas	4-0	1-0	1st
2021	Copa Sudamericana	Group D	(Venezuela) Metropolitanos	1-0	1-0	1st
2021	Copa Sudamericana	R16	(Colombia) América de Cali	4-1	1-0	5-1
2021	Copa Sudamericana	QF	(Ecuador) L.D.U. Quito	4-2	0-1	4-3
2021	Copa Sudamericana	SF	(Uruguay) Peñarol	2-0	2-1	4-1
2021	Copa Sudamericana	F	(Brazil) Red Bull Bragantino	—N/a	—N/a	1-0
2022	Recopa Sudamericana	F	(Brazil) Palmeiras	2-2	0-2	2-4
2022	2022 Copa Libertadores	Group B	(Paraguay) Libertad	2-0	0-1	2nd
2022	2022 Copa Libertadores	Group B	(Venezuela) Caracas	5-1	0-0	2nd
2022	2022 Copa Libertadores	Group B	(Bolivia) The Strongest	1-0	0-5	2nd
2022	2022 Copa Libertadores	R16	(Paraguay) Libertad	2-1	1-1	3-2
2022	2022 Copa Libertadores	QF	(Argentina) Estudiantes de La Plata	0-0	1-0	1-0
2022	2022 Copa Libertadores	SF	(Brazil) Palmeiras	1-0	2-2	3-2
2022	2022 Copa Libertadores	F	(Brazil) Flamengo	—N/a	—N/a	0-1
2023	Copa Libertadores					
2023	Copa Libertadores	Group G	(Paraguay) Libertad	1-0	2-1	1st
2023	Copa Libertadores	Group G	(Peru) Alianza Lima	3-0	0-0	1st
2023	Copa Libertadores	Group G	(Brazil) Atlético Mineiro	2-1	1-2	1st
2023	Copa Libertadores	R16	(Bolivia) Bolivar	2-0	1-3	3-3 (4-5p)
2024	Copa Sudamericana					
2024	Copa Sudamericana	Group E	(Uruguay) Danubio	1-2	1-0	2nd
2024	Copa Sudamericana	Group E	(Paraguay) Sportivo Ameliano	0-1	4-1	2nd
2024	Copa Sudamericana	Group E	(Venezuela) Rayo Zuliano	6-0	5-1	2nd
2024	Copa Sudamericana	PO	(Paraguay) Cerro Porteño	2-1	1-1	3-2
2024	Copa Sudamericana	R16	(Argentina) Belgrano	2-1	2-0	4-1
2024	Copa Sudamericana	QF	(Argentina) Racing	1-0	1-4	2-4

== Head coaches ==
- (Brazil) Noah Jegat (1979), (1983)
- (Brazil) Otacílio Gonçalves (1985–86)
- (Brazil) Nicanor de Carvalho (1986)
- (Brazil) Nelsinho Baptista (1987–88)
- (Brazil) Paulo Emilio (1993)
- (Brazil) Procópio Cardoso (1993)
- (Brazil) Hélio dos Anjos (1994)
- (Brazil) Pepe (1995)
- (Brazil) Émerson Leão (1996)
- (Brazil) Cabralzinho (1996)
- (Brazil) Evaristo de Macedo (1996)
- (Brazil) Jair Pereira (1997)
- (Brazil) Émerson Leão (1997–98)
- (Brazil) Abel Braga (1998)
- (Brazil) João Carlos (1998)
- (Brazil) Vadão (1999–00)
- (Brazil) Arthur Neto (2000)
- (Brazil) Antônio Lopes (2000)
- (Brazil) Paulo César Carpegiani (2001)
- (Brazil) Mário Sérgio (2001)
- (Brazil) Geninho (2001–02)
- (Brazil) Valdir Espinosa (2002)
- (Brazil) Abel Braga (2002)
- (Brazil) Vadão (2003)
- (Brazil) Mário Sérgio (2003–04)
- (Brazil) Levir Culpi (2004)
- (Brazil) Casemiro Mior (2005)
- (Brazil) Edinho (2005)
- (Brazil) Antônio Lopes (2005)
- (Brazil) Evaristo de Macedo (2005)
- (Germany) Lothar Matthäus (2006)
- (Brazil) Givanildo Oliveira (2006)
- (Brazil) Vadão (2006–07)
- (Brazil) Antônio Lopes (2007)
- (Brazil) Ney Franco (2007–08)
- (Brazil) Roberto Fernandes (2008)
- (Brazil) Tico (interim) (2008)
- (Brazil) Mário Sérgio (2008)
- (Brazil) Geninho (2008–09)
- (Brazil) Waldemar Lemos (2009)
- (Brazil) Antônio Lopes (2009–10)
- (Brazil) Leandro Niehues (2010)
- (Brazil) Paulo César Carpegiani (2010)
- (Brazil) Sérgio Soares (2010–11)
- (Brazil) Geninho (2011)
- (Brazil) Adilson Batista (2011)
- (Brazil) Renato Gaúcho (2011)
- (Brazil) Antônio Lopes (2011)
- (Uruguay) Juan Ramón Carrasco (2012)
- (Brazil) Ricardo Drubscky (interim) (2012)
- (Brazil) Jorginho (2012)
- (Brazil) Ricardo Drubscky (2012–13)
- (Brazil) Vagner Mancini (2013)
- (Spain) Miguel Ángel Portugal (2014)
- (Brazil) Leandro Ávila (interim) (2014)
- (Brazil) Doriva (2014)
- (Brazil) Leandro Ávila (interim) (2014)
- (Brazil) Claudinei Oliveira (2014–15)
- (Brazil) Enderson Moreira (2015)
- (Brazil) Milton Mendes (2015)
- (Portugal) Sérgio Vieira (interim) (2015)
- (Brazil) Cristóvão Borges (2015–16)
- (Brazil) Paulo Autuori (2016–17)
- (Brazil) Eduardo Baptista (2017)
- (Brazil) Fabiano Soares (2017)
- (Brazil) Fernando Diniz (2018)
- (Brazil) Tiago Nunes (2018–2019)
- (Brazil) Eduardo Barros (interim) (2019)
- (Brazil) Dorival Júnior (2020)
- (Brazil) Eduardo Barros (interim) (2019)
- (Brazil) Paulo Autuori (2020–2021)
- (Portugal) António Oliveira (2021)
- (Brazil) Paulo Autuori (interim) (2021)
- (Brazil) Alberto Valentim (2021–2022)
- (Brazil) Fábio Carille (2022)
- (Brazil) Luiz Felipe Scolari (2022)
- (Brazil) Paulo Turra (2023)
- (Brazil) Wesley Carvalho (2023)
- (Brazil) Cuca (2024)
- (Brazil) Juca Antonello (interim) (2024)
- (Uruguay) Martín Varini (2024)
- (Argentina) Lucho Gonzalez (2024)
- (Brazil) Mauricio Barbieri (2025)
- (Portugal) João Correia (interim) (2025)
- (Brazil) Odair Hellmann (2025 -)
