= Grêmio Novorizontino =

Brazilian association football club based in Novo Horizonte, São Paulo, Brazil

Novorizontino
- Full name: Grêmio Novorizontino
- Nickname: Tigre do Vale (Tiger of the Valley)
- Founded: 1 March 2010; 16 years ago
- Ground: Dr. Jorge Ismael de Biasi
- Capacity: 16,000
- SAF Owner: Novorizontino SAF (100%)
- President: Genilson da Rocha Santos
- Head coach: Enderson Moreira
- League: Campeonato Brasileiro Série B Campeonato Paulista
- 2025 2025: Série B, 7th of 20; Paulista, 6th of 16
- Website: www.gremionovorizontino.com.br
Home colors	Away colors

Grêmio Novorizontino, commonly referred to as simply Novorizontino, is a Brazilian association football club in Novo Horizonte, São Paulo. They currently play in the Série B, the second tier of Brazilian football, as well as in the Campeonato Paulista Série A1, the first tier of the São Paulo state football league.

== History ==
A replacement to dissolved Grêmio Esportivo Novorizontino, the club was founded on 1 March 2010, inheriting the club's colors and logo. After spending its first years in amateur football, the club joined Federação Paulista de Futebol in 2010, but only appeared in a competition of the federation in 2012.

In its first professional year, Novorizontino achieved a promotion from Campeonato Paulista Segunda Divisão, finishing fourth. After managing to survive in 2013's Série A3, the club was crowned champions in the following year, after defeating Independente de Limeira by 5–0 on aggregate.

On 28 April 2015, Novorizontino sealed its promotion to Campeonato Paulista Série A1, finishing second in the tournament. After managing to avoid relegation in the 2016 Campeonato Paulista, the club reached the competition's knockout rounds in the following year, but was knocked out by Palmeiras.

In 2020, Novorizontino achieved a first-ever promoton to the Série C, after reaching the semifinals of the 2020 Série D. In the 2021 Campeonato Paulista, the club won the Troféu do Interior, and achieved a second consecutive league promotion at the end of the year. Despite suffering relegation in the 2022 Paulistão, the club managed to avoid relegation in the Série B.

Novorizontino returned to the Paulista Série A1 immediately in 2023, and missed out a top tier promotion in the league's last round, finishing fifth. They reached the 2024 Campeonato Paulista semifinals, being again fifth in the league, before another stable state league and league campaigns in 2025.

In the 2026 Campeonato Paulista, Novorizontino reached the finals for the first time ever, but lost to Palmeiras. On 7 November of that year, the club achieved a first-ever promotion to the Série A, after a 2–1 win over Fortaleza. Seven days later, Novorizontino secure the title for the first time in their history after defeat Criciuma with narrowly 0–1 in away games a goal Juninho 69th minute.

== Current squad ==
As of 26 September 2026

Note: Flags indicate national team as defined under FIFA eligibility rules; some limited exceptions apply. Players may hold more than one non-FIFA nationality.

No.	Pos.	Nation	Player
1	GK	BRA	Lucas Ribeiro
2	DF	BRA	Madson
3	DF	BRA	Carlinhos (on loan from Noroeste)
4	DF	BRA	Patrick
5	DF	BRA	Sander
6	MF	BRA	Luís Oyama
7	FW	BRA	Ronald Barcellos (on loan from Maringá)
8	FW	ARG	Tití Ortiz
9	FW	BRA	Carlão
10	MF	BRA	Rômulo (on loan from Palmeiras)
11	FW	BRA	Robson (captain)
12	GK	BRA	João Scapin
14	DF	BRA	Eduardo Brock
15	MF	BRA	Tavinho
16	FW	BRA	Vinícius Paiva
17	MF	BRA	Matheus Bianqui (on loan from Coritiba)
18	MF	BRA	Léo Naldi (on loan from Vitória)
19	MF	BRA	Diego Galo

No.	Pos.	Nation	Player
22	DF	ARG	Iván Alvariño (on loan from Remo)
24	DF	PER	Jhilmar Lora
26	DF	BRA	Gabriel Bahia (on loan from Volta Redonda)
27	FW	BRA	Diego Mathias (on loan from Noroeste)
28	MF	BRA	Marlon
29	GK	BRA	Paulo Henrique (on loan from Vitória-ES)
30	FW	BRA	Nicolas Careca
31	GK	BRA	César Augusto
33	DF	BRA	Renato Palm
35	MF	BRA	Hector
36	MF	BRA	Miguel Contiero
40	FW	BRA	Jardiel (on loan from Grêmio)
41	FW	BRA	Reidiney
50	MF	BRA	Juninho
66	DF	BRA	Maykon Jesus (on loan from Atlético Mineiro)
77	FW	BRA	Hélio Borges
78	DF	BRA	Arthur Barbosa
93	GK	BRA	Jordi

=== Youth team ===
Note: Flags indicate national team as defined under FIFA eligibility rules; some limited exceptions apply. Players may hold more than one non-FIFA nationality.

No.	Pos.	Nation	Player
23	FW	BRA	Jhones Kauê
34	MF	BRA	Nogueira
37	MF	BRA	Esquerdinha
38	MF	BRA	Luiz Gabriel
54	MF	BRA	Bruno Santos
56	MF	ARG	Matías Ludueña

No.	Pos.	Nation	Player
60	DF	BRA	Luiz Otávio
70	MF	BRA	Matheus Geres
72	MF	BRA	Tiago
82	GK	BRA	Gustavo Hobold
90	DF	BRA	Gabriel Correia
—	DF	BRA	Bruno Santana

=== Out on loan ===
Note: Flags indicate national team as defined under FIFA eligibility rules; some limited exceptions apply. Players may hold more than one non-FIFA nationality.

No.	Pos.	Nation	Player
—	GK	BRA	Pedro Henrique (at Flamengo until 31 January 2027)
—	DF	BRA	Antony (at Goiânia until 30 November 2026)
—	DF	BRA	Dantas (at Athletico Paranaense until 31 December 2026)

No.	Pos.	Nation	Player
—	DF	BRA	Enzo Rocha (at Confiança until 30 November 2026)
—	DF	BRA	Kauan Alemão (at Athletico Paranaense until 31 December 2026)

== Honours ==
=== Official tournaments ===
National
Competitions	Titles	Seasons
Campeonato Brasileiro Série B	1	2026
State
Competitions	Titles	Seasons
Campeonato Paulista Série A3	1	2014

=== Others tournaments ===
==== State ====
- Campeonato Paulista do Interior (1): 2021

=== Runners-up ===
- Campeonato Paulista (1): 2026
- Campeonato Paulista Série A2 (2): 2015, 2023
