= Arena da Baixada =

Football stadium in Paraná, Brazil

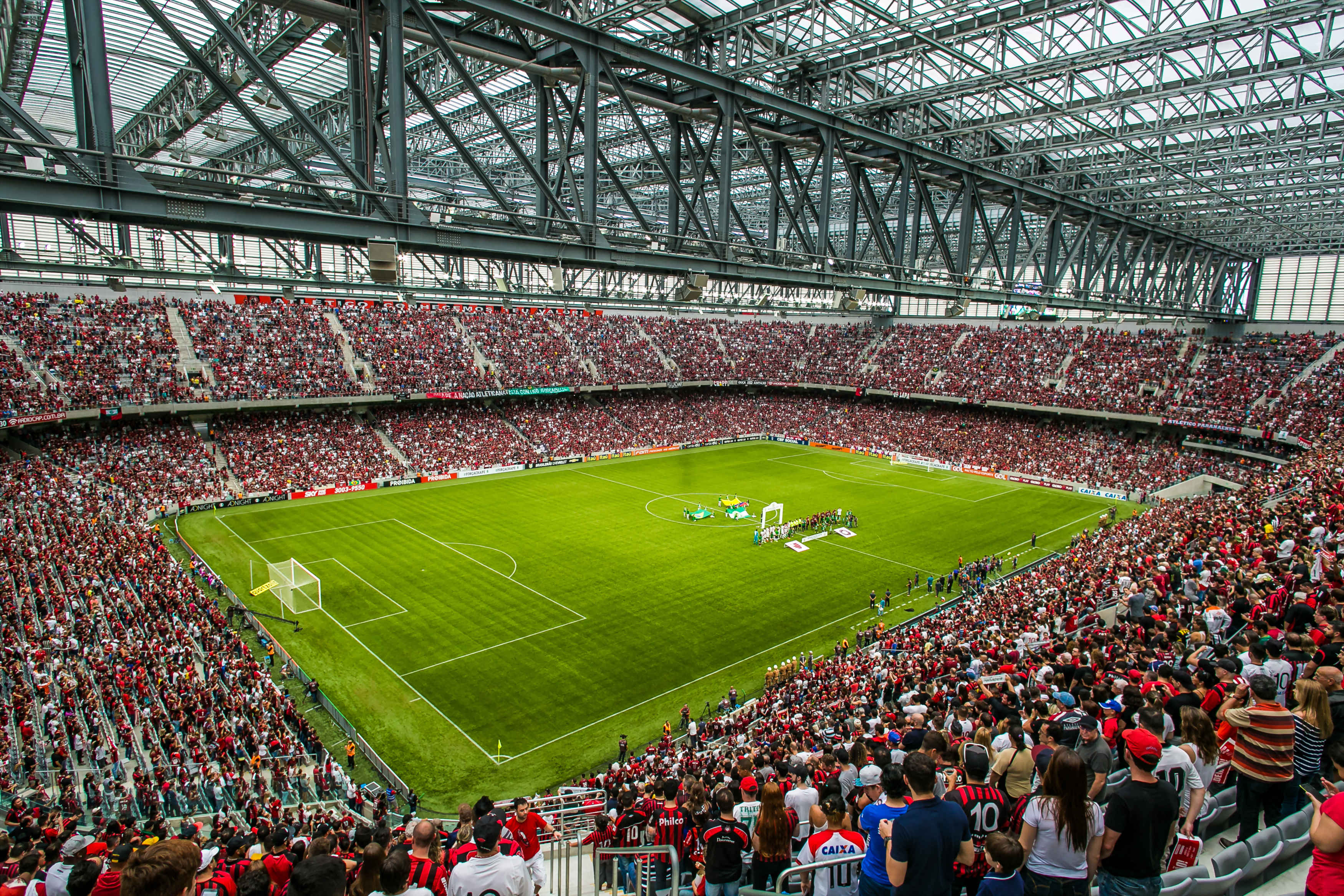
- Sisbrace
- Interactive map of Arena da Baixada
- Full name: Estádio Mario Celso Petraglia
- Former names: Estádio Joaquim Américo Guimarães (1997–2005; 2008–2023); Kyocera Arena (2005–2008); Ligga Arena (2023–2025)
- Location: Curitiba, Paraná, Brazil
- Coordinates: 25°26′54″S 49°16′37″W
- Owner: Club Athletico Paranaense
- Operator: G3 United
- Capacity: 42,372
- Roof: Retractable
- Surface: Artificial grass
- Record attendance: Non-football: 45,925 (religious event, 27 July 2019); Football: 42,177 (Athletico Paranaense vs. Atlético Goianiense, 20 November 2024)
- Field size: 105 m × 68 m (344 ft × 223 ft)

Construction
- Groundbreaking: December 1, 1997
- Opened: June 24, 1999
- Renovated: 2009, 2012–2014

Tenant
- Athletico Paranaense

Website
- www.liggaarena.com

Estádio Mario Celso Petraglia, locally known as Arena da Baixada, is a stadium located in Curitiba, the state capital of Paraná, Brazil. It is the home stadium of Athletico Paranaense, and has a capacity of 42,372 people. The stadium was the first in Brazil to sell its naming rights; it was known as Kyocera Arena between 2005 and 1 April 2008 and Ligga Arena between June 2023 and August 2025. It was the first retractable roof stadium built in South America.

With Curitiba selected as one of the host cities of the 2014 FIFA World Cup, the stadium was rebuilt from 2012 to 2014. Its capacity was expanded to 42,372 seats.

Located in the Água Verde borough near the center of Curitiba, the history of the stadium began in the early twentieth century, when in 1914, Joaquim Américo Guimarães (1879–1917), then president of the International (the forefathers of Club Athletico Paranaense), led the construction of the then Arena da Baixada stadium. Athletico came into existence ten years later, inheriting the assets, including the stadium.

== History ==
The stadium was built at the previous location of a Brazilian Army powder depot. In 1934, the stadium was renamed Estádio Joaquim Américo Guimarães. In 1980, the stadium received its first floodlights. From 1986 to 1994, the stadium was closed and Athletico Paranaense played their games at Estadio Pinheirão. After being reopened in 1994 and operating for some years, the old stadium building was demolished on March 26, 1997, right after a construction project of a new arena was announced. In June 1999, the new stadium was built. In 2005, the stadium was renamed Kyocera Arena, after the Japanese company Kyocera purchased the naming rights. The contract with Kyocera ended in early 2008. It was not renewed, and no new partnership was announced. As a result, the stadium went back to its old name, Arena da Baixada.

In February 2024, it was renamed Estádio Mario Celso Petraglia, in honor to its long-lasting president.

The inaugural match of the old stadium was played on 6 September 1914, when Flamengo beat Internacional 7–1. The first goal of the stadium was scored by Flamengo's Arnaldo.

The inaugural match of the new stadium was played on 24 June 1999, when Athletico Paranaense beat Cerro Porteño of Paraguay 2–1. The first goal of the stadium after its reinauguration was scored by Athletico's Lucas Severino.

The stadium's football attendance record currently stands at 40,263, set on 12 December 2018 when Athletico Paranaense defeated Atletico Junior on penalties for the 2018 Copa Sudamericana Final.

The attendance record for a non-football event was registered on July 27, 2019, when "Semana de Avivamento" took place (a religious event among evangelical churches). On this day, 45,925 people attended the event.

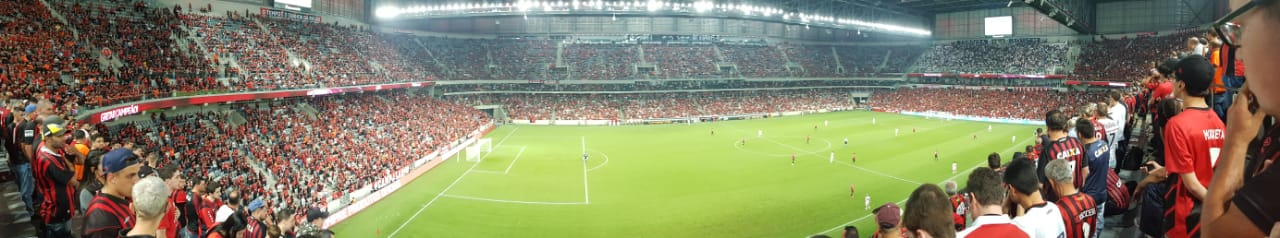
Arena da Baixada, in a game between Athletico Paranaense and Santos.

== 2014 FIFA World Cup ==
Ever since renovation works were completed in June 1999, the historic Estádio Joaquim Américo has been considered by many experts and journalists as one of Brazil's most modern and best-appointed stadiums.

The stadium, which was originally constructed back in 1914, was one of the venues chosen to host games at the 2014 FIFA World Cup.

Prior to welcoming the global showpiece, the stadium underwent another set of renovation works from 2012 to 2014. The renovations were a series of improvements in facilities and the addition of rows of extra seats parallel to the pitch. This resulted in an increased capacity of 42,000, which made it possible for the stadium to host four World Cup matches.

Construction of the stadium did not come without difficulties. Building work at the stadium was suspended in October 2013 on the orders of a Brazilian labor tribunal due to numerous and serious safety breaches. "Countless infractions have been committed, in various stages of the building project," wrote the judge Lorena Colnago in her decision, the Paraná Regional Labor Tribunal said in a statement. Subsequently, the planned retractable roof for the stadium was canceled because it would not be ready in time for the world cup. In late 2014, construction of the planned retractable roof resumed. With the completion of the project in March 2015, Arena da Baixada became the first stadium in South America with a retractable roof.

The official inauguration of the renovated stadium was on May 14, 2014, in a friendly match between Athletico and Corinthians Paulista that finished 2–1 to Corinthians in front of 30,000 people. The first goal was scored by Athletico's Marcelo Cirino in the 13th minute.

The first match to be held during the world cup was played between Iran and Nigeria, on June 16, ending with no goals.

=== Matches ===
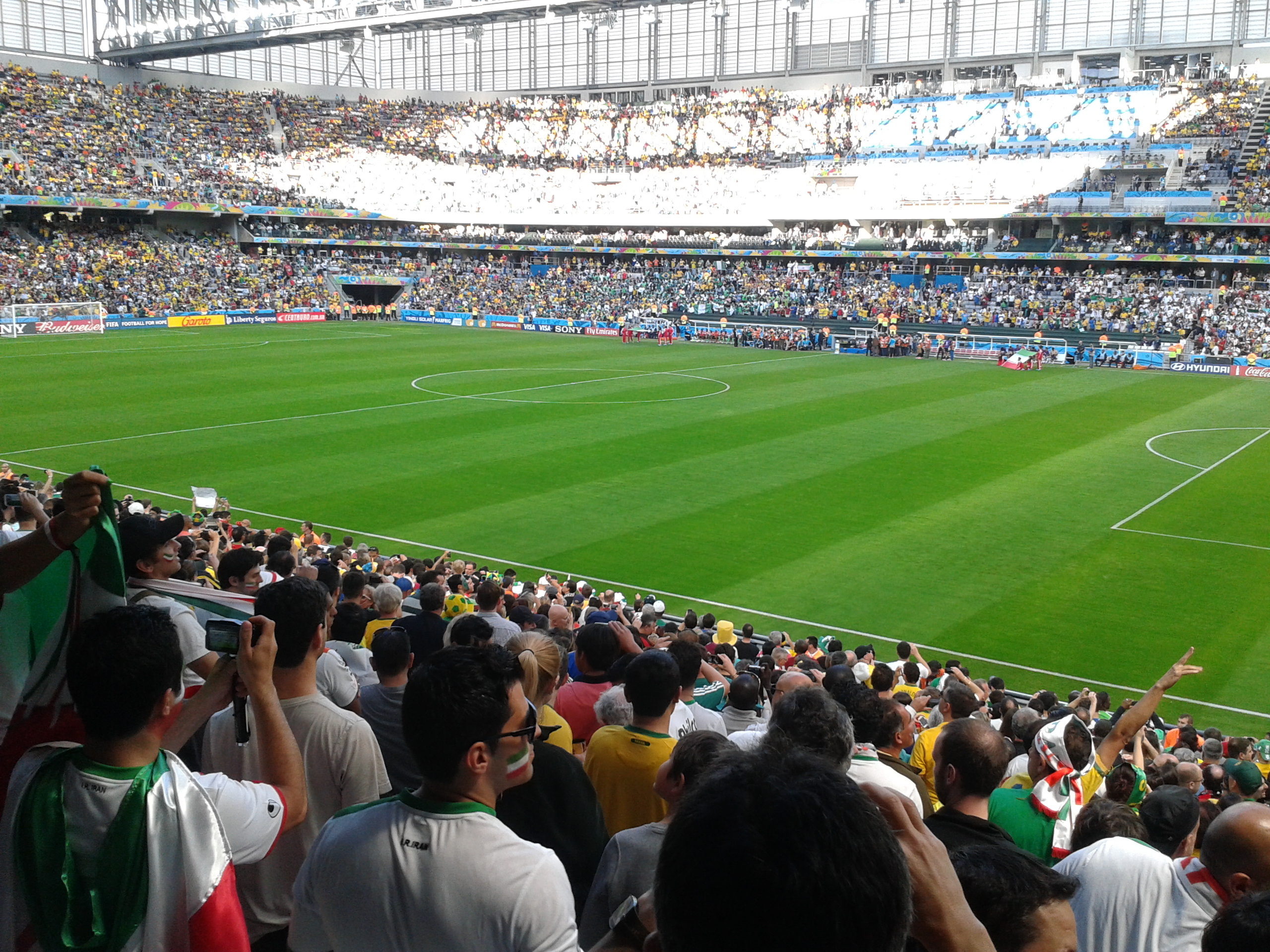
Arena da Baixada in 2014 FIFA World Cup Group F match between Iran and Nigeria on 16 June 2014

Date	Time (UTC-03)	Team #1	Result	Team #2	Round	Attendance
June 16, 2014	16:00	Iran	0–0	Nigeria	Group F	39,081
June 20, 2014	19:00	Honduras	1–2	Ecuador	Group E	39,224
June 23, 2014	13:00	Australia	0–3	Spain	Group B	39,375
June 26, 2014	17:00	Algeria	1–1	Russia	Group H	39,311

== UFC 198: Werdum vs. Miocic ==
The event was the first that the promotion hosted in Curitiba. It was the fourth stadium venue and first Brazilian stadium to host a UFC event and drew 45,207 fans, then the third largest crowd in UFC's history. Two Curitiba natives, Cris Cyborg and Shogun Rua, appeared on the official card with both winning their fights.

== 2017 FIVB Volleyball World League ==
In 2017, the stadium hosted the final round of 2017 FIVB Volleyball World League.

Pool J1

Date	Time		Score		Set 1	Set 2	Set 3	Set 4	Set 5	Total	Report
4 Jul	15:05	Brazil	3–1	Canada	25–21	17–25	25–19	25–19		92–84	P2 P3
5 Jul	15:05	Russia	0–3	Canada	23–25	27–29	17–25			67–79	P2 P3
6 Jul	15:05	Brazil	3–2	Russia	25–18	18–25	25–19	22–25	16–14	106–101	P2 P3

Pool K1

Date	Time		Score		Set 1	Set 2	Set 3	Set 4	Set 5	Total	Report
4 Jul	17:40	France	3–2	United States	27–25	20–25	26–24	17–25	15–12	105–111	P2 P3
5 Jul	17:40	Serbia	1–3	United States	22–25	23–25	25–19	22–25		92–94	P2 P3
6 Jul	18:10	France	3–2	Serbia	25–21	25–20	17–25	18–25	15–11	100–102	P2 P3

Semifinals

Date	Time		Score		Set 1	Set 2	Set 3	Set 4	Set 5	Total	Report
7 Jul	15:05	Brazil	3–1	United States	25–20	23–25	25–20	25–19		98–84	P2 P3
7 Jul	17:50	France	3–1	Canada	25–19	22–25	25–19	25–21		97–84	P2 P3

3rd place match

Date	Time		Score		Set 1	Set 2	Set 3	Set 4	Set 5	Total	Report
8 Jul	20:00	United States	1–3	Canada	25–18	20–25	22–25	21–25		88–93	P2 P3

Final

Date	Time		Score		Set 1	Set 2	Set 3	Set 4	Set 5	Total	Report
8 Jul	23:05	Brazil	2–3	France	25–21	15–25	23–25	25–19	13–15	101–105	P2 P3

Preceded by Tauron Arena; Kraków	FIVB Volleyball World League; Final Venue; 2017	Succeeded by Stade Pierre-Mauroy; Villeneuve-d'Ascq (as FIVB Volleyball Men's Nations League Final Venue)
