= Hayen Palacios =

Colombian footballer (born 1999)

Personal information
- Full name: Hayen Santiago Palacios Sánchez
- Date of birth: 8 September 1999 (age 27)
- Place of birth: Medellín, Colombia
- Height: 1.81 m (5 ft 11 in)
- Positions: Forward; right back

Team information
- Current team: Independiente Medellín (on loan from Athletico Paranaense)
- Number: 2

Youth career
- Atlético Nacional

Senior career*
Years	Team	Apps	(Gls)
2018–2022	Atlético Nacional	28	(3)
2022–2023	Aguilas Doradas	5	(0)
2023	Envigado	9	(1)
2024	Fortaleza	28	(3)
2025–	Athletico Paranaense	18	(3)
2025–2026	→ Nacional (loan)	2	(0)
2026–	→ Independiente Medellín (loan)	1	(0)

International career^{‡}
2019–	Colombia U20	0	(0)
- * Club domestic league appearances and goals as of 1 October 2025 ‡ National team caps and goals as of 13:31, 17 January 2019 (UTC)

Hayen Santiago Palacios Sánchez (born 8 September 1999) is a Colombian football player who plays as forward and Right back for Colombian club Independiente Medellín, on loan from Athletico Paranaense.

== Career statistics ==
=== Club ===
As of 29 April 2024

Club	Division	Season	League		Cup		Continental		Total	
Club	Division	Season	Apps	Goals	Apps	Goals	Apps	Goals	Apps	Goals
Atlético Nacional	Categoría Primera A	2018	8	1	1	0	–		9	1
Atlético Nacional	Categoría Primera A	2019	3	1	–		1	0	4	1
Atlético Nacional	Total		11	2	1	0	1	0	13	2
Alianza Petrolera	Categoría Primera A	2020	10	2	2	0	–		12	2
Atlético Nacional	Categoría Primera A	2021	9	0	2	0	–		11	0
Atlético Nacional	Categoría Primera A	2022	8	1	0	0	2	0	10	1
Atlético Nacional	Total		17	1	2	0	2	0	21	1
Águilas Doradas	Categoría Primera A	2022	4	0	0	0	–		4	0
Águilas Doradas	Categoría Primera A	2023	1	0	0	0	–		1	0
Águilas Doradas	Total		5	0	0	0	0	0	5	0
Envigado F.C.	Categoría Primera A	2023	9	1	0	0	–		9	1
Fortaleza C.E.I.F.	Categoría Primera A	2024	19	0	3	0	–		22	0
Career total			71	6	8	0	3	0	82	6

== Honours ==
Atlético Nacional

- Copa Colombia (2): 2018, 2021
- Categoría Primera A (1): 2022 Apertura
