= 2025 Club Athletico Paranaense season =

Club Athletico Paranaense
2025 season
- President: Mario Celso Petraglia
- Manager: Maurício Barbieri (until 4 May); Odair Hellmann (from 22 May)
- Stadium: Arena da Baixada
- Série B: 2nd
- Campeonato Paranaense: Semi-finals
- Copa do Brasil: Quarter-finals
- Top goalscorer: League: Kevin Viveros (9); All: Kevin Viveros (9)
Home colours	Away colours	Third colours

The 2025 season was the 101st year of Club Athletico Paranaense’s history. The team competed in the Campeonato Brasileiro Série B after relegation, the Campeonato Paranaense, and the Copa do Brasil.

== Squad ==
=== Transfers In ===
Pos.	Player	Transferred from	Fee	Date	Source
MF	(Brazil) Luiz Fernando	(Brazil) Atlético Goianiense	Free	1 January 2025	
DF	(Brazil) Léo	(Brazil) Vasco da Gama	€2,000,000	2 January 2025	
MF	(Brazil) Falcão	(Brazil) CRB	Undisclosed	5 January 2025	
FW	(Brazil) Leozinho	(Brazil) Ituano	Undisclosed	8 January 2025	
FW	(Brazil) Isaac	(Brazil) Fluminense	Undisclosed	13 January 2025	
FW	(Brazil) Alan Kardec	(Brazil) Atlético Mineiro	Free	14 January 2025	
DF	(Brazil) Dudu	(Brazil) Fortaleza	Undisclosed	15 January 2025	
MF	(Colombia) Kevin Viveros	(Colombia) Atlético Nacional	US$5,000,000	23 June 2025	
MF	(Colombia) Stiven Mendoza	(Mexico) León	Undisclosed	3 July 2025	
MF	(Colombia) Élan Ricardo	(Turkey) Beşiktaş	Loan	18 August 2025	
DF	(Colombia) Carlos Terán	(United States) Chicago Fire	Undisclosed	25 August 2025	

=== Transfers Out ===
Pos.	Player	Transferred to	Fee	Date	Source
MF	(Brazil) Fernandinho		End of contract	1 January 2025	
MF	(Brazil) Christian	(Brazil) Cruzeiro	€2,700,000	1 January 2025	
MF	(Brazil) Hugo Moura	(Brazil) Vasco da Gama	€2,000,000	1 January 2025	
MF	(Brazil) Erick	(Brazil) Bahia	€4,500,000	8 January 2025	
MF	(Uruguay) Agustín Canobbio	(Brazil) Fluminense	Undisclosed	10 January 2025	
DF	(Argentina) Leonardo Godoy	(Brazil) Santos	Loan	13 January 2025	

== Competitions ==
=== Overall record ===
Competition	First match	Last match	Starting round	Final position	Record							
Competition	First match	Last match	Starting round	Final position	Pld	W	D	L	GF	GA	GD	Win %
Série B	5 April 2025	22 November 2025	Matchday 1	2nd	38	19	8	11	53	43	+10	50.00
Campeonato Paranaense	11 January 2025	19 March 2025	League Phase	Semifinal	15	7	6	2	23	13	+10	46.67
Copa do Brasil	8 March 2025	10 September 2025	First Round	Quarterfinals	8	4	1	3	8	6	+2	50.00
Total					61	30	15	16	84	62	+22	49.18

Source: Competitions

=== Série B ===
==== League table ====
Pos	Team	Pld	W	D	L	GF	GA	GD	Pts	Promotion or relegation
1	Coritiba (C, P)	38	19	11	8	39	23	+16	68	Promotion to 2026 Campeonato Brasileiro Série A
2	Athletico Paranaense (P)	38	19	8	11	53	43	+10	65	Promotion to 2026 Campeonato Brasileiro Série A
3	Chapecoense (P)	38	18	8	12	52	35	+17	62	Promotion to 2026 Campeonato Brasileiro Série A
4	Remo (P)	38	16	14	8	51	39	+12	62	Promotion to 2026 Campeonato Brasileiro Série A
5	Criciúma	38	17	10	11	47	33	+14	61	

Source: CBF
Rules for classification: 1) points; 2) wins; 3) goal difference; 4) goals scored; 5) head-to-head results (only between 2 teams); 6) fewest red cards; 7) fewest yellow cards; 8) drawing of lots.
(C) Champions; (P) Promoted

==== Matches ====
4 April 2025 1	Paysandu	1–2	Athletico Paranaense	Belém
21:00 UTC−3	Leandro Vilela (yellow card) 40', (goal) 43'	Report	Fernando (yellow card) 18'; Zapelli 33'; Habraão (yellow card) 55'; Renan 72', (yellow card) 90+1'; Isaac (yellow card) 81'	Stadium: Estádio da Curuzu; Attendance: 16,081; Referee: Jefferson Ferreira de Moraes (Goiás)

10 April 2025 2	Athletico Paranaense	2–1	Criciúma	Curitiba
19:00 UTC−3	Alan Kardec 22'; Léo (yellow card) 75'; Patrick (yellow card) 81'; Palacios 84'	Report	Rodrigo (yellow card) 61'; Marcelo Hermes 76'; Luciano Castán (yellow card) 82'	Stadium: Ligga Arena; Referee: Paulo César Zanovelli da Silva (Minas Gerais)

15 April 2025 3	Cuiabá	2–1	Athletico Paranaense	Cuiabá
19:00 UTC−3	Lucas Mineiro 60'; Pedrinho 72'	Report	Léo Pelé 15'	Stadium: Arena Pantanal

20 April 2025 4	Athletico Paranaense	2–0	CRB	Curitiba
--:-- UTC−3	Alan Kardec 7'; Renan Peixoto 82'	Report		Stadium: Ligga Arena

24 April 2025 5	Novorizontino	2–1	Athletico Paranaense

4 May 2025 6	Athletico Paranaense	1–4	Botafogo-SP

8 May 2025 7	Athletico Paranaense	1–1	Chapecoense

17 May 2025 8	Vila Nova	2–1	Athletico Paranaense

24 May 2025 9	Athletico Paranaense	1–0	Athletic

1 June 2025 10	Operário Ferroviário	2–2	Athletico Paranaense

8 June 2025 11	Athletico Paranaense	0–1	Atlético Goianiense

14 June 2025 12	Athletico Paranaense	2–1	Remo

21 June 2025 13	Avaí	1–2	Athletico Paranaense

28 June 2025 14	Athletico Paranaense	0–1	Coritiba

5 July 2025 15	Amazonas	0–1	Athletico Paranaense

12 July 2025 16	Athletico Paranaense	0–1	Goiás

19 July 2025 17	Volta Redonda	3–2	Athletico Paranaense

22 July 2025 18	Athletico Paranaense	1–1	Ferroviária

27 July 2025 19	América Mineiro	2–2	Athletico Paranaense

3 August 2025 20	Athletico Paranaense	1–1	Paysandu

11 August 2025 21	Criciúma	4–2	Athletico Paranaense

16 August 2025 22	Athletico Paranaense	1–1	Cuiabá

23 August 2025 23	CRB	0–1	Athletico Paranaense

30 August 2025 24	Athletico Paranaense	2–1	Novorizontino

6 September 2025 25	Botafogo-SP	1–3	Athletico Paranaense

16 September 2025 26	Chapecoense	2–3	Athletico Paranaense

21 September 2025 27	Athletico Paranaense	2–0	Vila Nova

24 September 2025 28	Athletic	0–3	Athletico Paranaense

27 September 2025 29	Athletico Paranaense	1–0	Operário Ferroviário

5 October 2025 30	Atlético Goianiense	3–0	Athletico Paranaense

9 October 2025 31	Remo	2–1	Athletico Paranaense

14 October 2025 32	Athletico Paranaense	1–1	Avaí

19 October 2025 33	Coritiba	0–0	Athletico Paranaense

27 October 2025 34	Athletico Paranaense	2–0	Amazonas

1 November 2025 35	Goiás	0–1	Athletico Paranaense

8 November 2025 36	Athletico Paranaense	2–0	Volta Redonda

16 November 2025 37	Ferroviária	1–2	Athletico Paranaense

23 November 2025 38	Athletico Paranaense	1–0	América Mineiro

=== Campeonato Paranaense ===
Pos	Team	Pld	W	D	L	GF	GA	GD	Pts	Qualification or relegation
1	Operário Ferroviário	11	6	4	1	18	7	+11	22	Advance to Final stage
2	Athletico Paranaense	11	6	4	1	19	9	+10	22	Advance to Final stage
3	Coritiba	11	6	2	3	19	8	+11	20	Advance to Final stage
4	Londrina	11	6	2	3	16	10	+6	20	Advance to Final stage
5	Cianorte	11	5	2	4	18	13	+5	17	Advance to Final stage

Source: FPF

=== Copa do Brasil ===
==== First round ====
25 February 2025	Pouso Alegre	0–2	Athletico Paranaense	Pouso Alegre
21:30		Report	Luiz Fernando 5'; Velasco 74'	Stadium: Manduzão; Attendance: 4,507; Referee: Bráulio da Silva Machado (Santa Catarina)

==== Second round ====
13 March 2025	Athletico Paranaense	3–1	Guarany de Bagé	Curitiba
19:30	Luiz Fernando 12', 40', 73'	Report	Yan 58'	Stadium: Arena da Baixada; Attendance: 15,675; Referee: Flávio Rodrigues de Souza (São Paulo)

==== Third round ====
1 May 2025 First leg	Brusque	0–0	Athletico Paranaense	Joinville
16:00 UTC−3		Report		Stadium: Arena Joinville; Referee: Edina Alves Batista

20 May 2025 Second leg	Athletico Paranaense	1–0	Brusque	Curitiba
19:30 UTC−3	Kauã Moraes 1'	Report		Stadium: Ligga Arena; Referee: Paulo César Zanovelli da Silva
