= 2024 Campeonato Brasileiro Série A =

Football league

Campeonato Brasileiro Série A
- Season: 2024
- Dates: 13 April – 8 December 2024
- Champions: Botafogo (3rd title)
- Relegated: Athletico Paranaense; Criciúma; Atlético Goianiense; Cuiabá
- Copa Libertadores: Botafogo (via Copa Libertadores); Palmeiras; Flamengo (via Copa do Brasil); Fortaleza; Internacional; São Paulo; Corinthians; Bahia
- Copa Sudamericana: Cruzeiro; Vasco da Gama; Vitória; Atlético Mineiro; Fluminense; Grêmio
- Matches: 380
- Goals: 929 (2.44 per match)
- Top goalscorer: Yuri Alberto; Alerrandro (15 goals each)
- Biggest home win: Cuiabá 5–0 Fortaleza (16 June); Palmeiras 5–0 Cuiabá (24 August); Palmeiras 5–0 Criciúma (15 September)
- Biggest away win: Vasco da Gama 1–6 Flamengo (2 June)
- Highest scoring: Juventude 3–5 Palmeiras (20 October)
- Average attendance: 24,384

The 2024 Campeonato Brasileiro Série A (officially the Brasileirão Betano 2024 for sponsorship reasons) was the 68th season of the Campeonato Brasileiro Série A, the top level of professional football in Brazil, and the 22nd edition in a double round-robin since its establishment in 2003. The competition began on 13 April and ended on 8 December 2024.

The top six teams as well as the 2024 Copa do Brasil champions qualified for the Copa Libertadores. Meanwhile, the next six best-placed teams not qualified for Copa Libertadores qualified for the Copa Sudamericana, and the last four were relegated to Série B for 2025.

In this tournament, Botafogo won their third Brazilian championship and first since 1995, clinching the title after defeating São Paulo 2–1 on the final day of the season. Palmeiras were the defending champions.

== Teams ==
Twenty teams competed in the league: the top 16 teams from the previous season and four teams promoted from the Série B.

Vitória became the first club to be promoted on 12 November 2023 after a 2–1 win against Novorizontino. Criciúma were promoted on 18 November 2023, and Juventude and Atlético Goianiense were promoted on 25 November 2023.

Location of teams in 2024 Série A

| Pos. | Relegated from 2023 Série A |
|---|---|
| 17th | Santos |
| 18th | Goiás |
| 19th | Coritiba |
| 20th | América Mineiro |

| Pos. | Promoted from 2023 Série B |
|---|---|
| 1st | Vitória |
| 2nd | Juventude |
| 3rd | Criciúma |
| 4th | Atlético Goianiense |

=== Number of teams by state ===
| N.T. | State | Team(s) |
|---|---|---|
| 4 | Rio de Janeiro | Botafogo, Flamengo, Fluminense and Vasco da Gama |
| 4 | São Paulo | Corinthians, Palmeiras, Red Bull Bragantino and São Paulo |
| 3 | Rio Grande do Sul | Grêmio, Internacional and Juventude |
| 2 | Bahia | Bahia and Vitória |
| 2 | Minas Gerais | Atlético Mineiro and Cruzeiro |
| 1 | Ceará | Fortaleza |
| 1 | Goiás | Atlético Goianiense |
| 1 | Mato Grosso | Cuiabá |
| 1 | Paraná | Athletico Paranaense |
| 1 | Santa Catarina | Criciúma |

=== Stadiums and locations ===
| Team | Location | State | Stadium | Capacity |
|---|---|---|---|---|
| Athletico Paranaense | Curitiba | Paraná | Ligga Arena | 42,372 |
| Atlético Goianiense | Goiânia | Goiás | Antônio Accioly | 12,500 |
| Atlético Mineiro | Belo Horizonte | Minas Gerais | Arena MRV | 46,000 |
| Bahia | Salvador | Bahia | Casa de Apostas Arena Fonte Nova | 50,000 |
| Botafogo | Rio de Janeiro | Rio de Janeiro | Olímpico Nilton Santos | 46,931 |
| Corinthians | São Paulo | São Paulo | Neo Química Arena | 48,000 |
| Criciúma | Criciúma | Santa Catarina | Heriberto Hülse | 19,300 |
| Cruzeiro | Belo Horizonte | Minas Gerais | Mineirão | 61,846 |
| Cuiabá | Cuiabá | Mato Grosso | Arena Pantanal | 44,097 |
| Flamengo | Rio de Janeiro | Rio de Janeiro | Maracanã | 78,838 |
| Fluminense | Rio de Janeiro | Rio de Janeiro | Maracanã | 78,838 |
| Fortaleza | Fortaleza | Ceará | Castelão | 63,903 |
| Grêmio | Porto Alegre | Rio Grande do Sul | Arena do Grêmio | 55,662 |
| Internacional | Porto Alegre | Rio Grande do Sul | Beira-Rio | 50,128 |
| Juventude | Caxias do Sul | Rio Grande do Sul | Alfredo Jaconi | 19,924 |
| Palmeiras | São Paulo | São Paulo | Allianz Parque | 43,713 |
| Red Bull Bragantino | Bragança Paulista | São Paulo | Nabi Abi Chedid | 17,022 |
| São Paulo | São Paulo | São Paulo | MorumBIS | 67,428 |
| Vasco da Gama | Rio de Janeiro | Rio de Janeiro | São Januário | 21,880 |
| Vitória | Salvador | Bahia | Barradão | 30,793 |

== Personnel and kits ==
| Team | Head coach | Captain | Kit manufacturer | Main sponsor | Other sponsors |
|---|---|---|---|---|---|
| Athletico Paranaense | (Argentina) Lucho González | (Brazil) Thiago Heleno | Umbro | Esportes da Sorte | List: Front: Copacol; Back: Neodent, Banco Inter; Sleeves: None; Shorts: None; Socks: None; Number: None |
| Atlético Goianiense | (Brazil) Anderson Gomes (caretaker) | (Brazil) Ronaldo | Dragão Premium (Note: Club manufactured kit) | Blaze.com | List: Front: Blaze.com; Back: Unimed; Sleeves: Cristal Alimentos; Shorts: None; Socks: None; Number: None |
| Atlético Mineiro | (Brazil) Lucas Gonçalves (caretaker) | (Brazil) Hulk | Adidas | Betano | List: Front: You Saúde, Multimarcas Consórcios, Vilma Alimentos; Back: Galo BMG, Supermercados BH; Sleeves: Gerdau; Shorts: Auto Truck, ABC da Construção; Socks: None; Number: Mundiale |
| Bahia | (Brazil) Rogério Ceni | (Brazil) Éverton Ribeiro | Esquadrão | Esportes da Sorte | List: Front: Dular Alimentos; Back: Unimed; Sleeves: Canaã Alimentos; Shorts: ITS Brasil, Unimed, Faculdade Multivix; Socks: None; Number: Acelen |
| Botafogo | (Portugal) Artur Jorge | (Brazil) Marlon Freitas | Reebok | Parimatch | List: Front: None; Back: None; Sleeves: Centrum; Shorts: None; Socks: LifeFit; Number: None |
| Corinthians | (Argentina) Ramón Díaz | (Brazil) Fagner | Nike | Esportes da Sorte | List: Front: ALE Combustíveis, Foxlux; Back: EZZE Seguros; Sleeves: Corinthians BMG; Shorts: UniCesumar; Socks: None; Number: eFootball |
| Criciúma | (Brazil) Cláudio Tencati | (Brazil) Rodrigo | Volt Sport | EstrelaBet | List: Front: Sicredi; Back: Rocha Alimentos, Cristalcopo; Sleeves: Universidade do Extremo Sul Catarinense; Shorts: EstrelaBet; Socks: None; Number: Unimed |
| Cruzeiro | (Brazil) Fernando Diniz | (Argentina) Lucas Romero | Adidas | Betfair | List: Front: Lavitan, BP Consórcio; Back: Vilma Alimentos, Supermercados BH; Sleeves: Surf; Shorts: Faculdade Multivix; Socks: Kodilar Alimentos; Number: None |
| Cuiabá | (Brazil) Bernardo Franco | (Brazil) Walter | Kappa | Drebor | List: Front: Sicredi, Agro Amazônia; Back: Sicredi, Conheça Mato Grosso; Sleeves: None; Shorts: Conheça Mato Grosso; Socks: None; Number: None |
| Flamengo | (Brazil) Filipe Luís | (Brazil) Gerson | Adidas | PixBet | List: Front: Banco de Brasília; Back: Mercado Livre, Assist Card; Sleeves: Kwai; Shorts: ABC da Construção; Socks: Zé Delivery; Number: None |
| Fluminense | (Brazil) Mano Menezes | (Brazil) Thiago Silva | Umbro | Superbet | List: Front: Leve Saúde, Frescatto, Univassouras; Back: Zé Delivery; Sleeves: Zinzane; Shorts: ABC da Construção; Socks: None; Number: None |
| Fortaleza | (Argentina) Juan Pablo Vojvoda | (Brazil) Tinga | Volt Sport | Novibet | List: Front: Banco Inter, Zenir, Soccer Grass; Back: Brisanet, Soccer Grass, Unimed Fortaleza; Sleeves: Novibet; Shorts: Novibet, Matrix Fitness, SP Combustíveis; Socks: None; Number: Ftrade Brasil |
| Grêmio | (Brazil) Renato Gaúcho | (Brazil) Pedro Geromel | Umbro | Banrisul | List: Front: Esportes da Sorte; Back: Banrisul, Unimed; Sleeves: Vero Banrisul; Shorts: Esportes da Sorte; Socks: None; Number: Marquespan |
| Internacional | (Brazil) Roger Machado | (Brazil) Alan Patrick | Adidas | Banrisul | List: Front: None; Back: Banrisul, EstrelaBet, Unimed; Sleeves: Vero Banrisul; Shorts: None; Socks: None; Number: Marquespan |
| Juventude | (Brazil) Fábio Matias | (Brazil) Nenê | 19treze | Stake.com | List: Front: Randon Corp; Back: RodOil, Humana Saúde; Sleeves: None; Shorts: None; Socks: None; Number: None |
| Palmeiras | (Portugal) Abel Ferreira | (Paraguay) Gustavo Gómez | Puma | Crefisa | List: Front: Avanti Palmeiras, FAM Centro Universitário, Crefisa; Back: Crefisa, FAM Centro Universitário; Sleeves: Crefisa; Shorts: Crefisa; Socks: FAM Centro Universitário; Number: Crefisa |
| Red Bull Bragantino | (Brazil) Fernando Seabra | (Brazil) Cleiton | In-house | Red Bull | List: Front: None; Back: Red Bull, Asaas, Yanmar; Sleeves: Mrjack.bet; Shorts: None; Socks: None; Number: None |
| São Paulo | (Argentina) Luis Zubeldía | (Brazil) Rafinha | New Balance | Superbet | List: Front: Ademicon, Viva Sorte; Back: Superbet, Blue Plano de Saúde; Sleeves: None; Shorts: ABC da Construção; Socks: None; Number: eFootball |
| Vasco da Gama | (Brazil) Felipe (caretaker) | (Argentina) Pablo Vegetti | Kappa | Betfair | List: Front: Viva Sorte; Back: Vasco BMG, Betfair; Sleeves: Zé Delivery; Shorts: Viva Sorte, Intermac Assistance; Socks: None; Number: R10 Score |
| Vitória | (Brazil) Thiago Carpini | (Brazil) Wagner Leonardo | Volt Sport | Betsat | List: Front: Fatal Model, ITS Brasil, Acelen; Back: UniAgro; Sleeves: Vitória Bank; Shorts: X-Pro Ice Zero e Whey, Acelen; Socks: UniBarter; Number: None |

=== Coaching changes ===
| Team | Outgoing head coach | Manner of departure | Date of vacancy | Position in table | Incoming head coach | Date of appointment | Ref |
|---|---|---|---|---|---|---|---|
| Cruzeiro | (Brazil) Paulo Autuori | End of caretaker spell | 6 December 2023 | Pre-season | (Argentina) Nicolás Larcamón | 20 December 2023 | |
| Athletico Paranaense | (Brazil) Wesley Carvalho | End of caretaker spell | 7 December 2023 | Pre-season | (Colombia) Juan Carlos Osorio | 3 January 2024 | |
| São Paulo | (Brazil) Dorival Júnior | Signed by Brazil | 7 January 2024 | Pre-season | (Brazil) Thiago Carpini | 11 January 2024 | |
| Juventude | (Brazil) Thiago Carpini | Signed by São Paulo | 11 January 2024 | Pre-season | (Brazil) Roger Machado | 12 January 2024 | |
| Corinthians | (Brazil) Mano Menezes | Sacked | 5 February 2024 | State leagues | (Brazil) Thiago Kosloski (caretaker) | 5 February 2024 | |
| Corinthians | (Brazil) Thiago Kosloski (caretaker) | Sacked | 9 February 2024 | State leagues | (Portugal) António Oliveira | 9 February 2024 | |
| Cuiabá | (Portugal) António Oliveira | Signed by Corinthians | 9 February 2024 | State leagues | (Brazil) Luiz Fernando Iubel (caretaker) | 7 February 2024 | |
| Botafogo | (Brazil) Tiago Nunes | Sacked | 22 February 2024 | State leagues | (Brazil) Fábio Matias (caretaker) | 22 February 2024 | |
| Athletico Paranaense | (Colombia) Juan Carlos Osorio | Sacked | 3 March 2024 | State leagues | (Brazil) Cuca | 4 March 2024 | |
| Atlético Mineiro | (Brazil) Luiz Felipe Scolari | Mutual agreement | 20 March 2024 | State leagues | (Argentina) Gabriel Milito | 24 March 2024 | |
| Botafogo | (Brazil) Fábio Matias | End of caretaker spell | 3 April 2024 | State leagues | (Portugal) Artur Jorge | 3 April 2024 | |
| Cruzeiro | (Argentina) Nicolás Larcamón | Sacked | 8 April 2024 | State leagues | (Brazil) Fernando Seabra | 9 April 2024 | |
| São Paulo | (Brazil) Thiago Carpini | Sacked | 18 April 2024 | 19th | (Argentina) Luis Zubeldía (Note: Milton Cruz was the caretaker head coach in the 3rd round match against Atlético Goianiense on 21 April.) | 20 April 2024 | |
| Vasco da Gama | (Argentina) Ramón Díaz | Sacked | 27 April 2024 | 16th | (Brazil) Rafael Paiva (caretaker) | 27 April 2024 | |
| Cuiabá | (Brazil) Luiz Fernando Iubel | Resigned | 29 April 2024 | 20th | (Portugal) Petit (Note: Ricardo Colbachini was the caretaker head coach in a 2024 Copa do Brasil match against Goiás on 2 May.) | 1 May 2024 | |
| Vitória | (Brazil) Léo Condé | Sacked | 14 May 2024 | 18th | (Brazil) Thiago Carpini | 14 May 2024 | |
| Vasco da Gama | (Brazil) Rafael Paiva (caretaker) | End of caretaker spell | 21 May 2024 | 18th | (Portugal) Álvaro Pacheco | 21 May 2024 | |
| Vasco da Gama | (Portugal) Álvaro Pacheco | Sacked | 20 June 2024 | 17th | (Brazil) Rafael Paiva (caretaker) | 20 June 2024 | |
| Atlético Goianiense | (Brazil) Jair Ventura | Sacked | 21 June 2024 | 16th | (Brazil) Anderson Gomes (caretaker) | 21 June 2024 | |
| Athletico Paranaense | (Brazil) Cuca | Resigned | 24 June 2024 | 5th | (Brazil) Juca (caretaker) | 24 June 2024 | |
| Fluminense | (Brazil) Fernando Diniz | Sacked | 24 June 2024 | 20th | (Brazil) Marcão (caretaker) | 24 June 2024 | |
| Fluminense | (Brazil) Marcão | End of caretaker spell | 1 July 2024 | 20th | (Brazil) Mano Menezes | 1 July 2024 | |
| Corinthians | (Portugal) António Oliveira | Sacked | 2 July 2024 | 19th | (Brazil) Raphael Laruccia (caretaker) | 2 July 2024 | |
| Atlético Goianiense | (Brazil) Anderson Gomes | End of caretaker spell | 4 July 2024 | 17th | (Brazil) Vagner Mancini | 4 July 2024 | |
| Athletico Paranaense | (Brazil) Juca | End of caretaker spell | 10 July 2024 | 7th | (Uruguay) Martín Varini | 9 July 2024 | |
| Corinthians | (Brazil) Raphael Laruccia | End of caretaker spell | 10 July 2024 | 17th | (Argentina) Ramón Díaz | 10 July 2024 | |
| Internacional | (Argentina) Eduardo Coudet | Sacked | 10 July 2024 | 11th | (Brazil) Pablo Fernandez (caretaker) | 10 July 2024 | |
| Juventude | (Brazil) Roger Machado | Resigned | 17 July 2024 | 12th | (Brazil) Jair Ventura | 17 July 2014 | |
| Internacional | (Brazil) Pablo Fernandez | End of caretaker spell | 18 July 2024 | 13th | (Brazil) Roger Machado | 18 July 2024 | |
| Atlético Goianiense | (Brazil) Vagner Mancini | Sacked | 4 August 2024 | 20th | (Brazil) Umberto Louzer | 5 August 2024 | |
| Cuiabá | (Portugal) Petit | Resigned | 27 August 2024 | 19th | (Brazil) Bernardo Franco | 28 August 2024 | |
| Cruzeiro | (Brazil) Fernando Seabra | Sacked | 23 September 2024 | 7th | (Brazil) Fernando Diniz | 23 September 2024 | |
| Athletico Paranaense | (Uruguay) Martín Varini | Sacked | 23 September 2024 | 13th | (Argentina) Lucho González | 24 September 2024 | |
| Flamengo | (Brazil) Tite | Sacked | 30 September 2024 | 4th | (Brazil) Filipe Luís | 30 September 2024 | |
| Juventude | (Brazil) Jair Ventura | Sacked | 26 October 2024 | 17th | (Brazil) Fábio Matias | 27 October 2024 | |
| Red Bull Bragantino | (Portugal) Pedro Caixinha | Sacked | 27 October 2024 | 16th | (Brazil) Fernando Seabra | 31 October 2024 | |
| Atlético Goianiense | (Brazil) Umberto Louzer | Resigned | 29 October 2024 | 20th | (Brazil) Anderson Gomes (caretaker) (Note: Caretaker until the end of the season.) | 29 October 2024 | |
| Vasco da Gama | (Brazil) Rafael Paiva | Sacked | 24 November 2024 | 11th | (Brazil) Felipe (caretaker) | 24 November 2024 | |
| Atlético Mineiro | (Argentina) Gabriel Milito | Sacked | 4 December 2024 | 14th | (Brazil) Lucas Gonçalves (caretaker) | 5 December 2024 | |

== Foreign players ==
The clubs can have a maximum of nine foreign players in their Campeonato Brasileiro squads per match, but there is no limit of foreigners in the clubs' squads.

- Players marked in **bold** indicate they are registered during mid-season transfer window.

| Club | Player 1 | Player 2 | Player 3 | Player 4 | Player 5 | Player 6 | Player 7 | Player 8 | Player 9 | Player 10 | Player 11 |
|---|---|---|---|---|---|---|---|---|---|---|---|
| Athletico Paranaense | (Argentina) Tomás Cuello | (Argentina) Lucas Di Yorio | (Argentina) Lucas Esquivel | (Argentina) Leonardo Godoy | (Argentina) Bruno Zapelli | (Paraguay) Mateo Gamarra | (Uruguay) Agustín Canobbio | (Uruguay) Gonzalo Mastriani | | | |
| Atlético Goianiense | (Chile) Ángelo Araos | (Colombia) Yeferson Rodallega | (Costa Rica) **Joel Campbell** | (Uruguay) Alejo Cruz | (Uruguay) **Gonzalo Freitas** | (Uruguay) **Rafael Haller** | (Uruguay) Emiliano Rodríguez | (Venezuela) **Jan Carlos Hurtado** | (Venezuela) **Matías Lacava** | | |
| Atlético Mineiro | (Argentina) Rodrigo Battaglia | (Argentina) Renzo Saravia | (Argentina) **Fausto Vera** | (Argentina) Matías Zaracho | (Chile) Eduardo Vargas | (Colombia) Brahian Palacios | (Ecuador) Alan Franco | (Paraguay) **Júnior Alonso** | (Uruguay) Mauricio Lemos | | |
| Bahia | (Argentina) Víctor Cuesta | (Colombia) Santiago Arias | (Uruguay) Nicolás Acevedo | (Uruguay) Carlos de Pena | (Uruguay) **Luciano Rodríguez** | | | | | | |
| Botafogo | (Angola) Bastos | (Argentina) **Thiago Almada** | (Argentina) Alexander Barboza | (Paraguay) Gatito Fernández | (Paraguay) Óscar Romero | (Uruguay) Mateo Ponte | (Venezuela) Jefferson Savarino | | | | |
| Corinthians | (Argentina) Rodrigo Garro | (Ecuador) Diego Palacios | (Ecuador) Félix Torres | (Netherlands) **Memphis Depay** | (Paraguay) Ángel Romero | (Peru) **André Carrillo** | (Spain) **Héctor Hernández** | (Venezuela) **José Andrés Martínez** | | | |
| Criciúma | (Democratic Republic of the Congo) Yannick Bolasie | (Peru) Miguel Trauco | (Portugal) Tobias Figueiredo | (Venezuela) Wilker Ángel | | | | | | | |
| Cruzeiro | (Argentina) Álvaro Barreal | (Argentina) **Lautaro Díaz** | (Argentina) Juan Dinenno | (Argentina) Lucas Romero | (Argentina) Lucas Villalba | (Paraguay) **Fabrizio Peralta** | | | | | |
| Cuiabá | (Paraguay) Isidro Pitta | | | | | | | | | | |
| Flamengo | (Argentina) **Carlos Alcaraz** | (Argentina) Agustín Rossi | (Chile) Erick Pulgar | (Ecuador) **Gonzalo Plata** | (Nigeria) Shola Ogundana | (Uruguay) Giorgian de Arrascaeta | (Uruguay) Nicolás de la Cruz | (Uruguay) Guillermo Varela | (Uruguay) Matías Viña | | |
| Fluminense | (Argentina) Germán Cano | (Colombia) Jhon Arias | (Colombia) **Gabriel Fuentes** | (Colombia) Jan Lucumí | (Colombia) **Kevin Serna** | (Uruguay) **Facundo Bernal** | (Uruguay) David Terans | | | | |
| Fortaleza | (Argentina) Emanuel Brítez | (Argentina) Tomás Cardona | (Argentina) Juan Martín Lucero | (Argentina) Imanol Machuca | (Argentina) **Eros Mancuso** | (Argentina) Emmanuel Martínez | (Argentina) Tomás Pochettino | (Chile) Benjamín Kuscevic | (Venezuela) Kervin Andrade | | |
| Grêmio | (Argentina) Franco Cristaldo | (Argentina) Walter Kannemann | (Argentina) Agustín Marchesín | (Argentina) Cristian Pavón | (Chile) **Alexander Aravena** | (Colombia) **Miguel Monsalve** | (Denmark) **Martin Braithwaite** | (Paraguay) Mathías Villasanti | (Uruguay) **Matías Arezo** | (Venezuela) Yeferson Soteldo | |
| Internacional | (Argentina) **Braian Aguirre** | (Argentina) Lucas Alario | (Argentina) Alexandro Bernabei | (Argentina) Gabriel Mercado | (Colombia) Rafael Santos Borré | (Ecuador) Enner Valencia | (Uruguay) Sergio Rochet | (Uruguay) **Agustín Rogel** | | | |
| Juventude | (Argentina) Tomi Montefiori | (Ecuador) **Ronie Carrillo** | | | | | | | | | |
| Palmeiras | (Argentina) **Agustín Giay** | (Argentina) José Manuel López | (Argentina) Aníbal Moreno | (Colombia) Richard Ríos | (Paraguay) Gustavo Gómez | (Uruguay) Joaquín Piquerez | | | | | |
| Red Bull Bragantino | (Angola) **Ivan Cavaleiro** | (Colombia) **Kelvin Flórez** | (Colombia) Henry Mosquera | (Colombia) **Sergio Palacios** | (Ecuador) José Hurtado | (Uruguay) Thiago Borbas | | | | | |
| São Paulo | (Argentina) Jonathan Calleri | (Argentina) Alan Franco | (Argentina) Giuliano Galoppo | (Argentina) **Santiago Longo** | (Colombia) **Luis Manuel Orejuela** | (Ecuador) Robert Arboleda | (Ecuador) **Jhegson Méndez** | (Northern Ireland) **Jamal Lewis** | (Paraguay) Damián Bobadilla | (Uruguay) Michel Araújo | (Venezuela) Nahuel Ferraresi |
| Vasco da Gama | (Argentina) Juan Sforza | (Argentina) Pablo Vegetti | (Chile) Pablo Galdames | (Chile) **Jean Meneses** | (Colombia) **Emerson Rodríguez** | (France) Dimitri Payet | (Paraguay) Robert Rojas | (Switzerland) **Maxime Dominguez** | (Uruguay) Puma Rodríguez | | |
| Vitória | (Paraguay) Raúl Cáceres | | | | | | | | | | |

=== Players holding Brazilian dual nationality ===
They do not take foreign slot.

- (Bulgaria) Cicinho (Bahia)
- (Spain) Diego Costa (Grêmio)
- (Belgium) Wanderson (Internacional)
- (Portugal) João Moreira (São Paulo)

== Standings ==
=== League table ===
| Pos | Team | Pld | W | D | L | GF | GA | GD | Pts | Qualification or relegation |
|---|---|---|---|---|---|---|---|---|---|---|
| 1 | Botafogo (C) | 38 | 23 | 10 | 5 | 59 | 29 | +30 | 79 | Qualification for Copa Libertadores group stage (Note: Botafogo and Flamengo qualified for the Copa Libertadores group stage by winning the 2024 Copa Libertadores and the 2024 Copa do Brasil, respectively.) |
| 2 | Palmeiras | 38 | 22 | 7 | 9 | 60 | 33 | +27 | 73 | Qualification for Copa Libertadores group stage |
| 3 | Flamengo | 38 | 20 | 10 | 8 | 61 | 42 | +19 | 70 | Qualification for Copa Libertadores group stage |
| 4 | Fortaleza | 38 | 19 | 11 | 8 | 53 | 39 | +14 | 68 | Qualification for Copa Libertadores group stage |
| 5 | Internacional | 38 | 18 | 11 | 9 | 53 | 36 | +17 | 65 | Qualification for Copa Libertadores group stage |
| 6 | São Paulo | 38 | 17 | 8 | 13 | 53 | 43 | +10 | 59 | Qualification for Copa Libertadores group stage |
| 7 | Corinthians | 38 | 15 | 11 | 12 | 54 | 45 | +9 | 56 | Qualification for Copa Libertadores second stage |
| 8 | Bahia | 38 | 15 | 8 | 15 | 49 | 49 | 0 | 53 | Qualification for Copa Libertadores second stage |
| 9 | Cruzeiro | 38 | 14 | 10 | 14 | 43 | 41 | +2 | 52 | Qualification for Copa Sudamericana group stage |
| 10 | Vasco da Gama | 38 | 14 | 8 | 16 | 43 | 56 | −13 | 50 | Qualification for Copa Sudamericana group stage |
| 11 | Vitória | 38 | 13 | 8 | 17 | 45 | 52 | −7 | 47 | Qualification for Copa Sudamericana group stage |
| 12 | Atlético Mineiro | 38 | 11 | 14 | 13 | 47 | 54 | −7 | 47 | Qualification for Copa Sudamericana group stage |
| 13 | Fluminense | 38 | 12 | 10 | 16 | 33 | 39 | −6 | 46 | Qualification for Copa Sudamericana group stage |
| 14 | Grêmio | 38 | 12 | 9 | 17 | 44 | 50 | −6 | 45 | Qualification for Copa Sudamericana group stage |
| 15 | Juventude | 38 | 11 | 12 | 15 | 48 | 59 | −11 | 45 | |
| 16 | Red Bull Bragantino | 38 | 10 | 14 | 14 | 44 | 48 | −4 | 44 | |
| 17 | Athletico Paranaense (R) | 38 | 11 | 9 | 18 | 40 | 46 | −6 | 42 | Relegation to Campeonato Brasileiro Série B |
| 18 | Criciúma (R) | 38 | 9 | 11 | 18 | 42 | 61 | −19 | 38 | Relegation to Campeonato Brasileiro Série B |
| 19 | Atlético Goianiense (R) | 38 | 7 | 9 | 22 | 29 | 58 | −29 | 30 | Relegation to Campeonato Brasileiro Série B |
| 20 | Cuiabá (R) | 38 | 6 | 12 | 20 | 29 | 49 | −20 | 30 | Relegation to Campeonato Brasileiro Série B |

Source: CBF
Rules for classification: 1) points; 2) wins; 3) goal difference; 4) goals scored; 5) head-to-head results (only between two teams); 6) fewest red cards; 7) fewest yellow cards; 8) drawing of lots.
(C) Champions; (R) Relegated

== Results ==
| Home \ Away | CAP | ACG | CAM | BAH | BOT | COR | CRI | CRU | CUI | FLA | FLU | FOR | GRE | INT | JUV | PAL | RBB | SPA | VAS | VIT |
|---|---|---|---|---|---|---|---|---|---|---|---|---|---|---|---|---|---|---|---|---|
| Athletico Paranaense | — | 2–0 | 1–0 | 1–3 | 0–1 | 1–1 | 3–1 | 3–0 | 4–0 | 1–1 | 1–1 | 1–1 | 0–2 | 1–0 | 1–2 | 0–2 | 1–2 | 1–2 | 1–0 | 1–2 |
| Atlético Goianiense | 1–2 | — | 1–0 | 1–1 | 1–4 | 2–2 | 1–2 | 0–1 | 0–0 | 1–2 | 1–0 | 3–1 | 1–1 | 1–0 | 2–1 | 0–1 | 0–0 | 0–3 | 0–1 | 0–2 |
| Atlético Mineiro | 1–0 | 1–1 | — | 1–1 | 0–0 | 2–1 | 1–1 | 3–0 | 1–1 | 2–4 | 0–2 | 1–1 | 2–1 | 1–3 | 2–3 | 0–4 | 3–0 | 2–1 | 2–0 | 2–2 |
| Bahia | 1–1 | 2–0 | 3–0 | — | 0–0 | 0–1 | 1–0 | 4–1 | 1–2 | 0–2 | 2–1 | 1–0 | 1–0 | 1–1 | 2–0 | 1–2 | 1–0 | 0–3 | 2–1 | 2–0 |
| Botafogo | 1–1 | 1–0 | 3–0 | 1–2 | — | 2–1 | 1–1 | 0–3 | 0–0 | 4–1 | 1–0 | 2–0 | 0–0 | 1–0 | 5–1 | 1–0 | 2–1 | 2–1 | 3–0 | 1–1 |
| Corinthians | 5–2 | 3–0 | 0–0 | 3–0 | 0–1 | — | 2–1 | 2–1 | 1–1 | 2–1 | 3–0 | 0–0 | 2–2 | 2–2 | 1–1 | 2–0 | 1–1 | 2–2 | 3–1 | 3–2 |
| Criciúma | 0–0 | 2–0 | 2–1 | 2–2 | 2–1 | 2–4 | — | 1–0 | 2–5 | 0–3 | 1–1 | 1–1 | 0–1 | 1–1 | 1–1 | 1–2 | 1–0 | 1–1 | 2–2 | 0–1 |
| Cruzeiro | 2–0 | 3–1 | 0–0 | 1–1 | 3–2 | 3–0 | 2–1 | — | 2–1 | 0–1 | 2–0 | 1–2 | 1–1 | 0–0 | 2–0 | 1–2 | 2–1 | 0–1 | 1–1 | 3–1 |
| Cuiabá | 1–2 | 0–0 | 0–3 | 1–2 | 1–2 | 0–1 | 2–1 | 0–0 | — | 1–2 | 0–1 | 5–0 | 1–3 | 0–1 | 0–0 | 0–2 | 1–1 | 2–0 | 1–2 | 0–0 |
| Flamengo | 1–0 | 2–0 | 0–0 | 2–1 | 0–2 | 2–0 | 2–1 | 2–1 | 1–1 | — | 0–2 | 1–2 | 2–1 | 3–2 | 4–2 | 1–1 | 2–1 | 2–1 | 1–1 | 2–2 |
| Fluminense | 1–0 | 1–2 | 2–2 | 1–0 | 0–1 | 0–0 | 0–0 | 1–0 | 1–0 | 0–1 | — | 2–2 | 2–2 | 1–1 | 1–1 | 1–0 | 2–2 | 2–0 | 2–1 | 0–1 |
| Fortaleza | 1–0 | 3–1 | 1–1 | 4–1 | 1–1 | 1–0 | 1–0 | 1–1 | 1–0 | 0–0 | 1–0 | — | 1–0 | 3–0 | 2–1 | 3–0 | 1–1 | 1–0 | 3–0 | 3–1 |
| Grêmio | 2–0 | 3–1 | 2–3 | 0–2 | 1–2 | 0–3 | 1–2 | 0–2 | 1–0 | 3–2 | 1–0 | 3–1 | — | 0–1 | 2–2 | 2–2 | 0–2 | 2–1 | 1–0 | 2–0 |
| Internacional | 2–2 | 1–1 | 1–2 | 2–1 | 0–1 | 1–0 | 2–0 | 1–0 | 3–0 | 1–1 | 2–0 | 2–1 | 1–0 | — | 2–1 | 1–1 | 4–1 | 0–0 | 1–2 | 3–1 |
| Juventude | 1–1 | 1–0 | 1–1 | 2–1 | 3–2 | 2–0 | 1–2 | 0–1 | 1–1 | 2–1 | 2–1 | 0–3 | 3–0 | 1–3 | — | 3–5 | 1–1 | 0–0 | 2–0 | 1–1 |
| Palmeiras | 0–2 | 3–1 | 2–1 | 2–0 | 1–3 | 2–0 | 5–0 | 2–0 | 5–0 | 0–0 | 0–1 | 2–2 | 1–0 | 0–1 | 3–1 | — | 2–1 | 2–1 | 2–0 | 0–2 |
| Red Bull Bragantino | 1–0 | 3–1 | 1–2 | 2–1 | 0–1 | 1–0 | 5–1 | 1–1 | 0–0 | 1–1 | 0–1 | 1–2 | 2–2 | 2–2 | 2–1 | 0–0 | — | 1–1 | 2–1 | 2–1 |
| São Paulo | 2–1 | 1–0 | 2–2 | 3–1 | 2–2 | 3–1 | 2–1 | 2–0 | 0–1 | 1–0 | 2–1 | 1–2 | 1–0 | 1–3 | 1–2 | 0–0 | 2–0 | — | 3–0 | 2–1 |
| Vasco da Gama | 2–1 | 2–2 | 2–0 | 3–2 | 1–1 | 2–0 | 0–4 | 0–0 | 1–0 | 1–6 | 2–0 | 2–0 | 2–1 | 0–1 | 1–1 | 0–1 | 2–2 | 4–1 | — | 2–1 |
| Vitória | 0–1 | 0–2 | 4–2 | 2–2 | 0–1 | 1–2 | 2–1 | 2–2 | 1–0 | 1–2 | 2–1 | 2–0 | 1–1 | 2–1 | 1–0 | 0–1 | 1–0 | 1–3 | 0–1 | — |

Source: CBF
Legend: Blue = home team win; Yellow = draw; Red = away team win.

== Season statistics ==
=== Top scorers ===
| Rank | Player | Club | Goals |
|---|---|---|---|
| 1 | (Brazil) Yuri Alberto | Corinthians | 15 |
| 1 | (Brazil) Alerrandro | Vitória | 15 |
| 3 | (Brazil) Estêvão | Palmeiras | 13 |
| 4 | (Argentina) Pablo Vegetti | Vasco da Gama | 12 |
| 5 | (Brazil) Pedro | Flamengo | 11 |
| 5 | (Brazil) Wesley | Internacional | 11 |
| 5 | (Brazil) Raphael Veiga | Palmeiras | 11 |
| 5 | (Brazil) Luciano | São Paulo | 11 |
| 9 | (Brazil) Hulk | Atlético Mineiro | 10 |
| 9 | (Argentina) Rodrigo Garro | Corinthians | 10 |
| 9 | (Argentina) José Manuel López | Palmeiras | 10 |
| 9 | (Brazil) Lucas Moura | São Paulo | 10 |

Source: Soccerway

=== Top assists ===
| Rank | Player | Club | Assists |
|---|---|---|---|
| 1 | (Argentina) Rodrigo Garro | Corinthians | 10 |
| 2 | (Brazil) Estêvão | Palmeiras | 9 |
| 3 | (Venezuela) Jefferson Savarino | Botafogo | 7 |
| 3 | (Brazil) Matheus Pereira | Cruzeiro | 7 |
| 3 | (Brazil) Ganso | Fluminense | 7 |
| 6 | (Brazil) Cauly | Bahia | 6 |
| 6 | (Brazil) Jean Lucas | Bahia | 6 |
| 6 | (Brazil) Gerson | Flamengo | 6 |
| 6 | (Brazil) João Lucas | Juventude | 6 |
| 6 | (Argentina) Tomás Pochettino | Fortaleza | 6 |
| 6 | (Brazil) Lucas Moura | São Paulo | 6 |

Source: Soccerway

=== Clean sheets ===
| Rank | Player | Club | Clean sheets |
|---|---|---|---|
| 1 | (Brazil) John | Botafogo | 16 |
| 1 | (Brazil) Weverton | Palmeiras | 16 |
| 3 | (Brazil) Fábio | Fluminense | 13 |
| 3 | (Brazil) João Ricardo | Fortaleza | 13 |
| 5 | (Brazil) Marcos Felipe | Bahia | 9 |
| 5 | (Brazil) Walter | Cuiabá | 9 |
| 7 | (Brazil) Everson | Atlético Mineiro | 8 |
| 7 | (Argentina) Agustín Rossi | Flamengo | 8 |
| 7 | (Uruguay) Sergio Rochet | Internacional | 8 |
| 7 | (Brazil) Rafael | São Paulo | 8 |
| 7 | (Brazil) Léo Jardim | Vasco da Gama | 8 |
| 7 | (Brazil) Lucas Arcanjo | Vitória | 8 |

Source: FBref.com

== Awards ==
=== Monthly awards ===
| Month | Player of the month | | Ref. |
| Month | Player | Club | Ref. |
|---|---|---|---|
| April | (Brazil) Gustavo Scarpa | Atlético Mineiro | |
| May | (Uruguay) Nicolás de la Cruz | Flamengo | |
| June | (Brazil) Pedro | Flamengo | |
| July | (Brazil) Pedro | Flamengo | |
| August | (Brazil) Luiz Henrique | Botafogo | |
| September | (Brazil) Alan Patrick | Internacional | |
| October | (Brazil) Gerson | Flamengo | |

| Month | Goalkeeper of the month | | Ref. |
| Month | Player | Club | Ref. |
|---|---|---|---|
| April | (Brazil) Bento | Athletico Paranaense | |
| May | (Brazil) Bento | Athletico Paranaense | |
| June | (Brazil) Weverton | Palmeiras | |
| July | (Brazil) João Ricardo | Fortaleza | |
| August | (Brazil) Hugo Souza | Corinthians | |
| September | (Brazil) Weverton | Palmeiras | |
| October | (Brazil) Hugo Souza | Corinthians | |

| Month | Young Player of the month | | Ref. |
| Month | Player | Club | Ref. |
|---|---|---|---|
| April | (Uruguay) Mateo Ponte | Botafogo | |
| May | (Brazil) Alisson Santana | Atlético Mineiro | |
| June | (Brazil) Kaiki Bruno | Cruzeiro | |
| July | (Brazil) Mateus Carvalho | Vasco da Gama | |
| August | (Brazil) Estêvão | Palmeiras | |
| September | (Brazil) Igor Jesus | Botafogo | |
| October | (Brazil) Luiz Henrique | Botafogo | |

=== Season awards ===
Série A Team of the Year
| Goalkeeper | (Brazil) John (Botafogo) | | | |
| Defenders | (Brazil) Wesley França (Flamengo) | (Argentina) Alexander Barboza (Botafogo) | (Angola) Bastos (Botafogo) | (Argentina) Alexandro Bernabei (Internacional) |
| Midfielders | (Argentina) Rodrigo Garro (Corinthians) | (Brazil) Gerson (Flamengo) | (Brazil) Marlon Freitas (Botafogo) | (Brazil) Alan Patrick (Internacional) |
| Forwards | (Brazil) Luiz Henrique (Botafogo) | | (Brazil) Estêvão (Palmeiras) | |

Player marked bold won the "Best Player of the season award".

== Attendances ==
| # | Club | Average attendance |
|---|---|---|
| 1 | Flamengo | 54,337 |
| 2 | Corinthians | 43,612 |
| 3 | São Paulo | 39,966 |
| 4 | Bahia | 36,202 |
| 5 | Fluminense | 34,502 |
| 6 | Fortaleza | 31,934 |
| 7 | Palmeiras | 31,558 |
| 8 | Cruzeiro | 31,389 |
| 9 | Athletico Paranaense | 30,581 |
| 10 | Internacional | 29,301 |
| 11 | Botafogo | 28,604 |
| 12 | Atlético Mineiro | 27,662 |
| 13 | Vitória | 23,273 |
| 14 | Vasco da Gama | 20,969 |
| 15 | Grêmio | 20,381 |
| 16 | Criciúma | 14,651 |
| 17 | Juventude | 8,692 |
| 18 | Atlético Goianiense | 8,616 |
| 19 | Cuiabá | 7,536 |
| 20 | Red Bull Bragantino | 6,020 |
