= 2019 Campeonato Brasileiro Série A =

Year of professional football in Brazil

Campeonato Brasileiro Série A
- Season: 2019
- Dates: 27 April – 8 December 2019
- Champions: Flamengo (6th title)
- Relegated: Cruzeiro; CSA; Chapecoense; Avaí
- Copa Libertadores: Flamengo (via Copa Libertadores); Athletico Paranaense (via Copa do Brasil); Santos; Palmeiras; Grêmio; São Paulo; Internacional; Corinthians
- Copa Sudamericana: Fortaleza; Goiás; Bahia; Vasco da Gama; Atlético Mineiro; Fluminense
- Matches: 380
- Goals: 876 (2.31 per match)
- Top goalscorer: Gabriel Barbosa (25 goals)
- Biggest home win: Flamengo 6–1 Goiás (14 July 2019); Santos 6–1 Goiás (4 August 2019); Grêmio 6–1 Avaí (26 September 2019); Flamengo 6–1 Avaí (5 December 2019)
- Biggest away win: CSA 0–4 Athletico-PR (20 July 2019)
- Highest scoring: Grêmio 4–5 Fluminense (5 May 2019)
- Longest winning run: 8 games Flamengo
- Longest unbeaten run: 24 games Flamengo
- Longest winless run: 18 games Avaí
- Longest losing run: 8 games Avaí

The 2019 Campeonato Brasileiro Série A (officially the Brasileirão Assaí 2019 for sponsorship reasons) was the 63rd season of the Campeonato Brasileiro Série A, the top level of professional football in Brazil, and the 17th edition in a double round-robin since its establishment in 2003. The competition started on 27 April and ended on 8 December 2019.

The top six teams as well as the 2019 Copa do Brasil champions qualified for the Copa Libertadores. The next six best-placed teams not qualified for Copa Libertadores qualified for the Copa Sudamericana and the last four were relegated to Série B for 2020. Palmeiras were the defending champions. During the 2019 season, the official match ball was the Nike Merlin CBF.

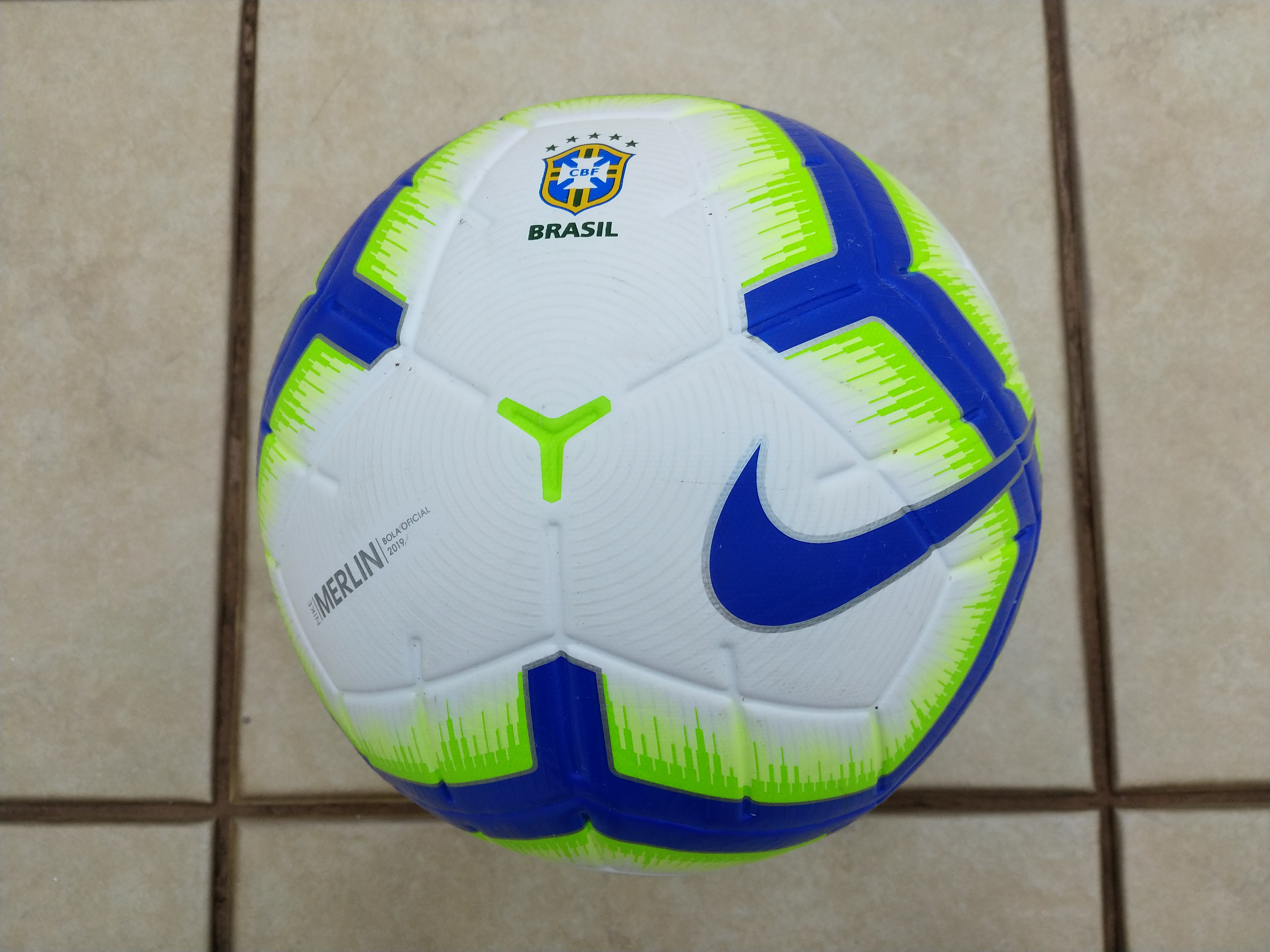
2019 Nike Merlin CBF

Flamengo secured their sixth league title with four matches to spare on 24 November and just one day after winning the 2019 Copa Libertadores, following Palmeiras' 2–1 loss to Grêmio at home.

== Teams ==
Location of teams in 2019 Série A

Twenty teams competed in the league – the top sixteen teams from the previous season, as well as four teams promoted from the Série B.

Fortaleza became the first club to be promoted after a 1–2 win against Atlético Goianiense on 3 November 2018. Goiás was promoted on 17 November, and Avaí and CSA on 24 November.

Pos.	Relegated from 2018 Série A
17	Sport
18	América Mineiro
19	Vitória
20	Paraná

Pos.	Promoted from 2018 Série B
1	Fortaleza
2	CSA
3	Avaí
4	Goiás

=== Number of teams by state ===
Number of teams	State	Team(s)
4	Rio de Janeiro	Botafogo, Flamengo, Fluminense and Vasco da Gama
4	São Paulo	Corinthians, Palmeiras, Santos and São Paulo
2	Ceará	Ceará and Fortaleza
2	Minas Gerais	Atlético Mineiro and Cruzeiro
2	Rio Grande do Sul	Grêmio and Internacional
2	Santa Catarina	Avaí and Chapecoense
1	Alagoas	CSA
1	Bahia	Bahia
1	Goiás	Goiás
1	Paraná	Athletico Paranaense

=== Stadiums and locations ===
Team	Location	State	Stadium	Capacity
Athletico Paranaense	Curitiba	Paraná	Arena da Baixada	42,370
Atlético Mineiro	Belo Horizonte	Minas Gerais	Mineirão	61,846
Avaí	Florianópolis	Santa Catarina	Ressacada	17,800
Bahia	Salvador	Bahia	Arena Fonte Nova	47,907
Botafogo	Rio de Janeiro	Rio de Janeiro	Olímpico Nilton Santos	44,661
Ceará	Fortaleza	Ceará	Arena Castelão	63,903
Chapecoense	Chapecó	Santa Catarina	Arena Condá	20,089
Corinthians	São Paulo	São Paulo	Arena Corinthians	47,605
Cruzeiro	Belo Horizonte	Minas Gerais	Independência	23,018
CSA	Maceió	Alagoas	Rei Pelé	17,126
Flamengo	Rio de Janeiro	Rio de Janeiro	Maracanã	78,838
Fluminense	Rio de Janeiro	Rio de Janeiro	Maracanã	78,838
Fortaleza	Fortaleza	Ceará	Arena Castelão	63,903
Goiás	Goiânia	Goiás	Serra Dourada	50,049
Grêmio	Porto Alegre	Rio Grande do Sul	Arena do Grêmio	55,662
Internacional	Porto Alegre	Rio Grande do Sul	Beira-Rio	50,128
Palmeiras	São Paulo	São Paulo	Allianz Parque	43,713
Santos	Santos	São Paulo	Urbano Caldeira	16,068
São Paulo	São Paulo	São Paulo	Morumbi	72,039
Vasco da Gama	Rio de Janeiro	Rio de Janeiro	São Januário	24,584

== Personnel and kits ==
Team	Manager	Captain	Kit manufacturer	Shirt main sponsor
Athletico Paranaense	(Brazil) Eduardo Barros (caretaker)	(Brazil) Thiago Heleno	Umbro	Banco Digi+
Atlético Mineiro	(Brazil) Vágner Mancini	(Brazil) Léo Silva	Le Coq Sportif	Meu Galo BMG
Avaí	(Brazil) Evando Spinassé Camillato	(Brazil) Betão	Umbro	None
Bahia	(Brazil) Roger Machado	(Brazil) Lucas Fonseca	Esquadrão (club manufactured kit)	Alimentos Dular
Botafogo	(Brazil) Alberto Valentim	(Argentina) Joel Carli	Kappa	Azeite Royal
Ceará	(Brazil) Argel Fucks	(Brazil) Tiago Alves	Topper	Finanzero/MVC
Chapecoense	(Brazil) Marquinhos Santos	(Brazil) Douglas Bacelar	Umbro	Aurora Coop
Corinthians	(Brazil) Dyego Coelho (caretaker)	(Brazil) Cássio Ramos	Nike	Meu Corinthians BMG
Cruzeiro	(Brazil) Adílson Batista	(Brazil) Henrique Pacheco Lima	Umbro	Banco Digi+
CSA	(Brazil) Jacozinho (caretaker)	(Brazil) Didira	Azulão (club manufactured kit)	Carajás Home Center
Flamengo	(Portugal) Jorge Jesus	(Brazil) Diego Ribas	Adidas	Banco BS2
Fluminense	(Brazil) Marcão	(Brazil) Digão	Under Armour	None
Fortaleza	(Brazil) Rogério Ceni	(Brazil) Marcelo Boeck	Leão1918 (club manufactured kit)	Banco Digi+
Goiás	(Brazil) Ney Franco	(Brazil) Léo Sena	Gr33n (club manufactured kit)	Marjo Sports
Grêmio	(Brazil) Renato Gaúcho	(Brazil) Maicon Souza	Umbro	Banrisul
Internacional	(Brazil) Zé Ricardo (caretaker)	(Argentina) Andrés D'Alessandro	Nike	Banrisul
Palmeiras	(Brazil) Andrey Lopes (caretaker)	(Brazil) Bruno Henrique	Puma	Crefisa
Santos	(Argentina) Jorge Sampaoli	(Brazil) Victor Ferraz	Umbro	None
São Paulo	(Brazil) Fernando Diniz	(Brazil) Anderson Hernanes	Adidas	Banco Inter
Vasco da Gama	(Brazil) Vanderlei Luxemburgo	(Brazil) Leandro Castán	Diadora	Meu Vasco BMG

(c) = caretaker

=== Foreign players ===
The clubs can have a maximum of five foreign players in their Campeonato Brasileiro squads per match, but there is no limit of foreigners in the clubs' squads.

Club	Player 1	Player 2	Player 3	Player 4	Player 5	Player 6	Player 7
Athletico Paranaense	(Argentina) Lucho González	(Argentina) Tomás Andrade	(Argentina) Marco Ruben	(Argentina) Braian Romero			
Atlético Mineiro	(Ecuador) Juan Cazares	(Colombia) Yimmi Chará	(Uruguay) David Terans	(Venezuela) Rómulo Otero	(Paraguay) Ramón Martínez	(Uruguay) Lucas Hernández	(Argentina) Franco Di Santo
Avaí	(Colombia) Jonny Mosquera	(Paraguay) Richard Franco					
Bahia	(Venezuela) Alejandro Guerra						
Botafogo	(Argentina) Joel Carli	(Paraguay) Gatito Fernández	(Chile) Leonardo Valencia				
Ceará	(South Korea) Chico Hyun-sol Kim^{dn}						
Chapecoense	(Argentina) Diego Torres						
Corinthians	(Ecuador) Junior Sornoza	(Argentina) Mauro Boselli	(Uruguay) Bruno Méndez				
Cruzeiro	(Colombia) Luis Manuel Orejuela	(Argentina) Ariel Cabral	(Cameroon) Joel Tagueu				
CSA	(Argentina) Jonathan Gómez	(Paraguay) Rodolfo Gamarra	(Paraguay) Héctor Bustamante				
Flamengo	(Colombia) Orlando Berrío	(Uruguay) Giorgian De Arrascaeta	(Paraguay) Robert Piris Da Motta	(Spain) Pablo Marí			
Fluminense	(Colombia) Yony González	(Portugal) Marcos Paulo^{dn}					
Fortaleza	(Uruguay) Santiago Romero	(Colombia) Juan Sebastián Quintero	(Argentina) Mariano Vázquez	(Colombia) Fabián Zambrano			
Goiás	(Uruguay) Leandro Barcia						
Grêmio	(Argentina) Walter Kannemann						
Internacional	(Argentina) Andrés D'Alessandro	(Uruguay) Nicolás López	(Argentina) Víctor Cuesta	(Colombia) Santiago Tréllez	(Argentina) Martín Sarrafiore	(Peru) Paolo Guerrero	(United States) Johnny Cardoso^{dn}
Palmeiras	(Colombia) Miguel Borja	(Colombia) Iván Angulo	(Paraguay) Gustavo Gómez				
Santos	(Uruguay) Carlos Sánchez	(Paraguay) Derlis González	(Venezuela) Yeferson Soteldo	(Colombia) Felipe Aguilar	(Peru) Christian Cueva	(Costa Rica) Bryan Ruiz	(Colombia) Fernando Uribe
São Paulo	(Ecuador) Joao Rojas	(Ecuador) Robert Arboleda	(Uruguay) Gonzalo Carneiro	(Spain) Juanfran			
Vasco da Gama	(Paraguay) Raúl Cáceres	(Colombia) Oswaldo Henríquez	(Colombia) Fredy Guarin				

(dn) = Player holding Brazilian dual nationality.

=== Managerial changes ===
Team	Outgoing manager	Manner of departure	Date of vacancy	Position in table	Incoming manager	Date of appointment
Vasco da Gama	(Brazil) Marcos Valadares	End of caretaker tenure	12 May	20th	(Brazil) Vanderlei Luxemburgo	13 May
Flamengo	(Brazil) Abel Braga	Resigned	29 May	6th	(Brazil) Marcelo Salles (caretaker)	29 May
Flamengo	(Brazil) Marcelo Salles	End of caretaker tenure	1 June	4th	(Portugal) Jorge Jesus	1 June
Avaí	(Brazil) Geninho	Sacked	17 June	20th	(Brazil) Alberto Valentim	18 June
CSA	(Brazil) Marcelo Cabo	Sacked	30 June	19th	(Brazil) Argel Fucks	2 July
Chapecoense	(Brazil) Ney Franco	Sacked	24 July	19th	(Brazil) Emerson Cris (caretaker)	24 July
Chapecoense	(Brazil) Emerson Cris	End of caretaker tenure	16 September	19th	(Brazil) Marquinhos Santos	16 September
Goiás	(Brazil) Claudinei Oliveira	Resigned	4 August	12th	(Brazil) Robson Gomes (caretaker)	4 August
Goiás	(Brazil) Robson Gomes	End of caretaker tenure	7 August	12th	(Brazil) Ney Franco	7 August
Cruzeiro	(Brazil) Mano Menezes	Resigned	8 August	18th	(Brazil) Rogério Ceni	11 August
Fortaleza	(Brazil) Rogério Ceni	Signed by Cruzeiro	11 August	14th	(Brazil) Zé Ricardo	12 August
Fluminense	(Brazil) Fernando Diniz	Sacked	19 August	18th	(Brazil) Oswaldo de Oliveira	20 August
Palmeiras	(Brazil) Luiz Felipe Scolari	Sacked	2 September	5th	(Brazil) Mano Menezes	3 September
São Paulo	(Brazil) Cuca	Resigned	26 September	6th	(Brazil) Fernando Diniz	26 September
Cruzeiro	(Brazil) Rogério Ceni	Sacked	26 September	16th	(Brazil) Abel Braga	27 September
Fortaleza	(Brazil) Zé Ricardo	Sacked	27 September	15th	(Brazil) Rogério Ceni	29 September
Fluminense	(Brazil) Oswaldo de Oliveira	Sacked	27 September	16th	(Brazil) Marcão	27 September
Ceará	(Brazil) Enderson Moreira	Sacked	1 October	15th	(Brazil) Adílson Batista	2 October
Botafogo	(Brazil) Eduardo Barroca	Sacked	6 October	12th	(Brazil) Alberto Valentim	11 October
Internacional	(Brazil) Odair Hellmann	Sacked	10 October	6th	(Brazil) Ricardo Colbachini (caretaker)	10 October
Avaí	(Brazil) Alberto Valentim	Signed by Botafogo	11 October	19th	(Brazil) Evando	11 October
Atlético Mineiro	(Brazil) Rodrigo Santana	Sacked	13 October	11th	(Brazil) Vágner Mancini	14 October
Internacional	(Brazil) Ricardo Colbachini	End of caretaker tenure	21 October	6th	(Brazil) Zé Ricardo	21 October
Corinthians	(Brazil) Fábio Carille	Sacked	3 November	8th	(Brazil) Dyego Coelho (caretaker)	3 November
Athletico Paranaense	(Brazil) Tiago Nunes	Signed by Corinthians (to 2020)	5 November	6th	(Brazil) Eduardo Barros (caretaker)	5 November
Ceará	(Brazil) Adílson Batista	Sacked	27 November	16th	(Brazil) Argel Fucks	29 November
CSA	(Brazil) Argel Fucks	Signed with Ceará	29 November	18th	(Brazil) Jacozinho (caretaker)	
Cruzeiro	(Brazil) Abel Braga	Sacked	29 November	17th	(Brazil) Adílson Batista	29 November
Palmeiras	(Brazil) Mano Menezes	Sacked	1 December	3rd	(Brazil) Andrey Lopes (caretaker)	2 December

== Standings ==
=== League table ===
Pos	Team	Pld	W	D	L	GF	GA	GD	Pts	Qualification or relegation
1	Flamengo (C)	38	28	6	4	86	37	+49	90	Qualification for Copa Libertadores group stage (Note: Flamengo qualified for the Copa Libertadores group stage by winning the 2019 Copa Libertadores. Athletico Paranaense qualified for the Copa Libertadores group stage by winning the 2019 Copa do Brasil.)
2	Santos	38	22	8	8	60	33	+27	74	Qualification for Copa Libertadores group stage
3	Palmeiras	38	21	11	6	61	32	+29	74	Qualification for Copa Libertadores group stage
4	Grêmio	38	19	8	11	64	39	+25	65	Qualification for Copa Libertadores group stage
5	Athletico Paranaense	38	18	10	10	51	32	+19	64	Qualification for Copa Libertadores group stage
6	São Paulo	38	17	12	9	39	30	+9	63	Qualification for Copa Libertadores group stage
7	Internacional	38	16	9	13	44	39	+5	57	Qualification for Copa Libertadores second stage
8	Corinthians	38	14	14	10	42	34	+8	56	Qualification for Copa Libertadores second stage
9	Fortaleza	38	15	8	15	50	49	+1	53	Qualification for Copa Sudamericana first stage
10	Goiás	38	15	7	16	46	64	−18	52	Qualification for Copa Sudamericana first stage
11	Bahia	38	12	13	13	44	43	+1	49	Qualification for Copa Sudamericana first stage
12	Vasco da Gama	38	12	13	13	39	45	−6	49	Qualification for Copa Sudamericana first stage
13	Atlético Mineiro	38	13	9	16	45	49	−4	48	Qualification for Copa Sudamericana first stage
14	Fluminense	38	12	10	16	38	46	−8	46	Qualification for Copa Sudamericana first stage
15	Botafogo	38	13	4	21	31	45	−14	43	
16	Ceará	38	10	9	19	36	41	−5	39	
17	Cruzeiro (R)	38	7	15	16	27	46	−19	36	Relegation to Campeonato Brasileiro Série B
18	CSA (R)	38	8	8	22	24	58	−34	32	Relegation to Campeonato Brasileiro Série B
19	Chapecoense (R)	38	7	11	20	31	52	−21	32	Relegation to Campeonato Brasileiro Série B
20	Avaí (R)	38	3	11	24	18	62	−44	20	Relegation to Campeonato Brasileiro Série B

Source: CBF
Rules for classification: 1) points; 2) wins; 3) goal difference; 4) goals scored; 5) head-to-head results; 6) least red cards received; 7) least yellow cards received; 8) draw.
(C) Champions; (R) Relegated

=== Positions by round ===
The table lists the positions of teams after each week of matches.
In order to preserve chronological evolvements, any postponed matches are not included to the round at which they were originally scheduled, but added to the full round they were played immediately afterwards.

Team ╲ Round	1	2	3	4	5	6	7	8	9	10	11	12	13	14	15	16	17	18	19	20	21	22	23	24	25	26	27	28	29	30	31	32	33	34	35	36	37	38
Flamengo	4	7	9	7	9	6	4	5	3	3	3	3	3	3	2	1	1	1	1	1	1	1	1	1	1	1	1	1	1	1	1	1	1	1	1	1	1	1
Santos	9	3	4	2	4	5	3	2	2	2	2	1	1	1	1	2	2	2	3	3	3	3	3	2	3	3	3	3	3	3	3	3	3	2	2	2	2	2
Palmeiras	2	4	2	1	1	1	1	1	1	1	1	2	2	2	3	3	5	3	2	2	2	2	2	3	2	2	2	2	2	2	2	2	2	3	3	3	3	3
Grêmio	13	17	18	18	19	18	18	13	11	10	11	11	13	14	13	12	11	11	8	7	7	8	8	7	6	7	7	7	5	5	4	4	4	4	4	4	4	4
Athletico-PR	3	6	8	6	10	12	10	11	12	12	7	7	8	11	8	10	9	9	11	9	9	9	9	9	10	9	9	8	8	6	7	6	5	5	5	5	5	5
São Paulo	5	1	3	3	3	4	8	8	9	9	5	5	6	5	5	4	4	5	6	6	6	7	5	5	5	5	4	4	4	4	5	5	6	6	6	6	6	6
Internacional	16	13	15	9	5	7	5	7	4	5	6	6	7	8	7	7	6	6	4	4	4	5	6	6	7	6	6	5	6	7	8	7	7	7	8	7	8	7
Corinthians	11	10	11	12	8	3	9	10	10	8	10	8	5	6	6	5	3	4	5	5	5	4	4	4	4	4	5	6	7	8	6	8	8	8	7	8	7	8
Fortaleza	19	15	16	16	14	14	14	17	14	13	14	14	14	12	14	15	12	13	14	15	15	14	14	13	15	15	14	14	12	12	14	13	12	12	10	9	9	9
Goiás	10	11	14	10	6	10	12	9	6	7	9	9	12	13	12	11	13	14	15	12	12	11	10	10	9	10	10	10	10	9	10	10	11	9	9	10	10	10
Bahia	7	9	5	8	11	8	6	6	8	11	12	12	10	10	10	8	8	7	7	8	8	6	7	8	8	8	8	9	9	10	9	9	9	10	11	11	11	11
Vasco da Gama	18	20	20	20	20	20	20	18	15	16	15	15	15	15	15	14	15	15	12	13	13	13	13	14	12	11	11	11	11	11	12	11	10	11	12	12	13	12
Atlético-MG	8	2	1	4	2	2	2	3	5	4	4	4	4	4	4	6	7	8	9	10	10	10	11	11	11	12	12	12	13	13	11	12	13	13	14	13	12	13
Fluminense	14	19	13	15	13	15	16	15	16	15	17	17	16	16	18	18	18	17	16	17	16	16	15	15	14	14	16	16	17	17	15	17	17	15	15	15	14	14
Botafogo	17	12	6	5	7	11	7	4	7	6	8	10	9	7	9	9	10	10	10	11	11	12	12	12	13	13	13	13	14	14	17	14	14	14	13	14	15	15
Ceará	1	5	12	14	12	9	11	12	13	14	13	13	11	9	11	13	14	12	13	14	14	15	16	17	16	16	15	15	15	15	13	15	15	16	16	16	16	16
Cruzeiro	15	14	7	11	15	16	15	14	18	17	16	16	18	17	16	16	16	16	17	18	17	17	18	18	18	18	17	17	16	16	16	16	16	17	17	17	17	17
CSA	20	18	17	17	18	17	17	19	19	19	19	19	19	19	19	19	19	19	18	16	18	18	17	16	17	17	18	18	18	18	18	18	18	18	18	18	18	18
Chapecoense	6	8	10	13	16	13	13	16	17	18	18	18	17	18	17	17	17	18	19	20	20	20	20	20	20	20	19	19	19	19	19	19	19	19	19	19	19	19
Avaí	12	16	19	19	17	19	19	20	20	20	20	20	20	20	20	20	20	20	20	19	19	19	19	19	19	19	20	20	20	20	20	20	20	20	20	20	20	20

Leader and Copa Libertadores group stage
Copa Libertadores group stage
Copa Libertadores second stage
Copa Sudamericana first stage
Relegation to Campeonato Brasileiro Série B

Source: CBF.com

== Results ==
Home \ Away	CAP	CAM	AVA	BAH	BOT	CEA	CHA	COR	CRU	CSA	FLA	FLU	FOR	GOI	GRE	INT	PAL	SAN	SPA	VAS
Athletico Paranaense	—	1–0	0–1	1–0	1–0	1–0	1–1	0–2	0–0	1–0	0–2	3–0	4–1	4–1	2–0	1–0	1–1	1–0	0–1	4–1
Atlético Mineiro	0–1	—	2–1	0–1	2–0	2–1	0–2	2–1	2–0	4–0	2–1	2–1	2–2	2–0	1–4	1–3	0–2	2–0	1–1	1–2
Avaí	0–0	1–0	—	0–2	0–2	1–2	0–1	1–1	2–2	0–0	0–3	1–1	1–3	0–0	1–1	0–2	1–2	1–2	0–0	0–0
Bahia	1–2	1–1	1–0	—	2–0	1–2	1–1	3–2	0–0	1–0	3–0	3–2	1–1	1–1	1–0	2–3	1–1	0–1	0–0	1–1
Botafogo	2–1	2–1	2–0	3–2	—	1–1	0–0	1–0	0–2	2–1	0–1	0–1	1–0	3–1	0–1	0–1	0–1	0–1	1–2	1–0
Ceará	1–1	1–2	1–0	0–0	0–0	—	4–1	0–1	0–0	4–0	0–3	2–0	2–1	0–1	2–1	2–0	2–0	0–1	1–1	1–1
Chapecoense	1–1	1–2	1–0	0–0	0–1	1–0	—	0–1	1–1	3–0	0–1	1–1	1–3	2–2	0–1	2–0	1–2	0–1	0–3	1–2
Corinthians	2–2	1–0	3–0	2–1	2–0	2–2	1–0	—	1–2	1–0	1–1	1–2	3–2	2–0	0–0	0–0	1–1	0–0	1–0	1–0
Cruzeiro	0–2	0–0	0–0	1–1	0–0	1–0	1–2	0–0	—	0–1	1–2	0–0	1–1	2–1	1–4	1–1	0–2	2–0	1–0	1–0
CSA	0–4	2–2	3–1	1–2	1–2	1–0	2–0	2–1	1–1	—	0–2	0–1	0–2	1–0	0–0	1–0	1–1	0–0	1–2	0–3
Flamengo	3–2	3–1	6–1	3–1	3–2	4–1	2–1	4–1	3–1	1–0	—	2–0	2–0	6–1	3–1	3–1	3–0	1–0	0–0	4–4
Fluminense	1–2	1–1	0–1	2–0	0–1	1–1	1–1	1–0	4–1	0–1	0–0	—	0–0	0–1	2–1	2–1	1–0	1–1	1–2	0–0
Fortaleza	2–1	2–2	2–0	2–1	1–0	1–0	2–0	1–3	2–1	3–0	1–2	0–1	—	2–0	2–1	0–1	0–1	2–1	0–1	1–1
Goiás	2–1	0–0	2–0	4–3	1–0	2–1	3–1	2–2	1–0	1–0	2–2	3–0	1–2	—	3–2	2–1	1–2	0–3	1–2	0–1
Grêmio	2–1	1–0	6–1	0–1	3–0	2–1	3–3	0–0	2–0	2–1	0–1	4–5	1–0	3–0	—	2–0	1–1	1–2	3–0	2–1
Internacional	1–1	2–1	2–0	3–1	3–2	1–0	1–0	0–0	3–1	2–0	2–1	2–1	2–2	1–2	1–1	—	1–1	0–0	1–0	0–1
Palmeiras	1–0	1–1	2–0	2–2	1–0	1–0	1–0	1–1	1–0	6–2	1–3	3–0	4–0	5–1	1–2	1–0	—	4–0	3–0	1–1
Santos	1–1	3–1	3–1	1–0	4–1	2–1	2–0	1–0	4–1	2–0	4–0	2–1	3–3	6–1	0–3	0–0	2–0	—	1–1	3–0
São Paulo	0–1	2–0	1–0	0–0	2–0	1–0	4–0	1–0	1–1	1–1	1–1	0–2	2–1	0–1	0–0	2–1	1–1	3–2	—	1–0
Vasco da Gama	1–1	1–2	1–1	0–2	2–1	1–0	1–1	1–1	1–0	0–0	1–4	2–1	1–0	1–1	1–3	2–1	1–2	0–1	2–0	—

Source: CBF
Legend: Blue = home team win; Yellow = draw; Red = away team win.

== Season statistics ==
=== Top scorers ===
Rank	Player	Club	Goals
1	(Brazil) Gabriel Barbosa	Flamengo	25
2	(Brazil) Bruno Henrique	Flamengo	21
3	(Brazil) Eduardo Sasha	Santos	14
3	(Brazil) Gilberto	Bahia	14
5	(Uruguay) Giorgian De Arrascaeta	Flamengo	13
5	(Brazil) Everaldo	Chapecoense	13
5	(Brazil) Wellington Paulista	Fortaleza	13
8	(Brazil) Thiago Galhardo	Ceará	12
8	(Uruguay) Carlos Sánchez	Santos	12
10	(Brazil) Everton	Grêmio	11

Source: Globoesporte.com

=== Assists ===
Rank	Player	Club	Assists
1	(Uruguay) Giorgian De Arrascaeta	Flamengo	14
2	(Brazil) Dudu	Palmeiras	11
3	(Uruguay) Carlos Sánchez	Santos	9
4	(Brazil) Gabriel Barbosa	Flamengo	8
4	(Brazil) Rony	Athletico Paranaense	8
6	(Brazil) Éverton Ribeiro	Flamengo	7
6	(Brazil) Clayson	Corinthians	7
8	(Brazil) Ricardinho	Ceará	6
8	(Brazil) Juninho	Fortaleza	6
8	(Brazil) Alisson	Grêmio	6
8	(Brazil) Luan	Grêmio	6
8	(Brazil) Antony	São Paulo	6

Source: Soccerway.com

=== Hat-tricks ===
Player	For	Against	Result	Date	Ref.
(Uruguay) Giorgian De Arrascaeta	Flamengo	Goiás	6–1	14 July 2019	
(Brazil) Gilberto	Bahia	Flamengo	3–0	4 August 2019	
(Brazil) Thiago Galhardo	Ceará	Chapecoense	4–1	10 August 2019	
(Brazil) Luiz Adriano	Palmeiras	Fluminense	3–0	10 September 2019	
(Brazil) Bruno Henrique	Flamengo	Corinthians	4–1	3 November 2019	
(Brazil) Bruno Henrique	Flamengo	Ceará	4–1	27 November 2019	

=== Clean sheets ===
Rank	Player	Club	Clean sheets
1	(Brazil) Tiago Volpi	São Paulo	15
1	(Brazil) Cássio	Corinthians	15
2	(Brazil) Éverson	Santos	14
2	(Brazil) Douglas Friedrich	Bahia	14
5	(Brazil) Diego Alves	Flamengo	13
5	(Brazil) Weverton	Palmeiras	13
7	(Brazil) Fábio	Cruzeiro	12
7	(Brazil) Paulo Victor	Grêmio	12
7	(Brazil) Santos	Athletico Paranaense	12
10	(Brazil) Marcelo Lomba	Internacional	11
10	(Brazil) Fernando Miguel	Vasco da Gama	11
10	(Brazil) Tadeu	Goiás	11

Source: FBref.com

=== Average home attendances ===
Ranked from highest to lowest average attendance.

Pos.	Team	Stadium	GP	Cumulative	Average
1	Flamengo	Maracanã	19	1,045,477	55,025
2	Fortaleza	Castelão	19	626,996	33,000
3	Corinthians	Arena Corinthians	19	624,261	32,856
4	São Paulo	Morumbi	19	559,203	29,432
5	Palmeiras	Allianz Parque	19	531,269	27,962
6	Bahia	Fonte Nova	19	500,439	26,339
7	Ceará	Castelão	19	494,191	26,010
8	Cruzeiro	Mineirão	19	426,335	22,439
9	Vasco da Gama	São Januário	19	388,523	20,449
10	Fluminense	Maracanã	19	383,977	20,209
11	Internacional	Beira-Rio	19	376,655	19,824
12	Grêmio	Arena do Grêmio	19	316,309	16,648
13	Botafogo	Nilton Santos	19	302,512	15,922
14	Atletico Mineiro	Independência	19	289,861	15,256
15	Athletico Paranaense	Arena da Baixada	19	287,182	15,115
16	Goiás	Serra Dourada	19	256,625	13,507
17	CSA	Rei Pelé	19	203,419	10,706
18	Santos	Vila Belmiro	19	195,830	10,307
19	Avaí	Ressacada	19	146,384	7,704
20	Chapecoense	Arena Condá	19	114,071	6,004
–	Total		380	8,069,528	21,236

== Awards ==
=== Annual awards ===
Award	Winner	Club
Prêmio Craque do Brasileirão Best Coach	(Portugal) Jorge Jesus	Flamengo
Bola de Prata Best Coach	(Portugal) Jorge Jesus	Flamengo
Prêmio Craque do Brasileirão Best Newcomer	(Brazil) Michael	Goiás
Bola de Prata Best Newcomer	(Brazil) Michael	Goiás
Prêmio Craque do Brasileirão Best Player	(Brazil) Bruno Henrique	Flamengo
Bola de Ouro Best Player	(Brazil) Gabriel Barbosa	Flamengo
Prêmio Craque do Brasileirão Goal of the Season	(Uruguay) Giorgian De Arrascaeta	Flamengo

Série A Team of the Year
Goalkeeper	(Brazil) Santos (Athletico Paranaense)			
Defence	(Brazil) Rafinha (Flamengo)	(Brazil) Rodrigo Caio (Flamengo)	(Spain) Pablo Marí (Flamengo)	(Brazil) Filipe Luís (Flamengo)
Midfield	(Uruguay) Giorgian De Arrascaeta (Flamengo)	(Brazil) Gerson (Flamengo)	(Brazil) Bruno Guimarães (Athletico Paranaense)	(Brazil) Éverton Ribeiro (Flamengo)
Attack	(Brazil) Gabriel Barbosa (Flamengo)		(Brazil) Bruno Henrique (Flamengo)	
