= João Ricardo (footballer, born 1988) =

Brazilian footballer

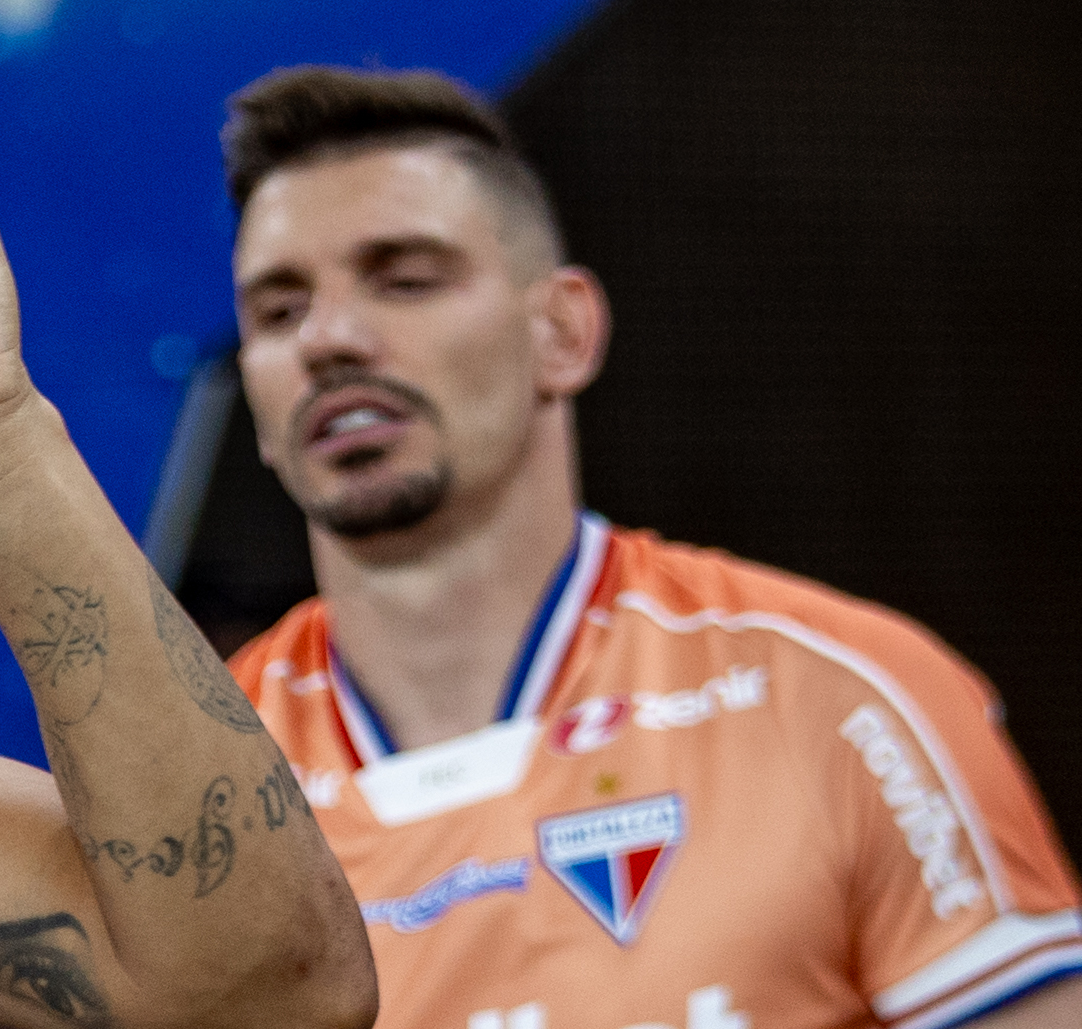
- João Ricardo with Fortaleza in 2023

Personal information
- Full name: João Ricardo Riedi
- Date of birth: 6 September 1988 (age 38)
- Place of birth: Mariano Moro, Brazil
- Height: 1.88 m (6 ft 2 in)
- Position: Goalkeeper

Team information
- Current team: Fortaleza
- Number: 1

Senior career*
Years	Team	Apps	(Gls)
2008	Concórdia		
2008–2010	Brusque	4	(0)
2010	Goiânia	9	(0)
2011–2012	Brusque	40	(0)
2012	Marcílio Dias	8	(0)
2012	Rio Branco-AC	0	(0)
2012	Paysandu	8	(0)
2013	Veranópolis	17	(0)
2013	Icasa	32	(0)
2014–2015	Paraná	1	(0)
2014–2015	→ América Mineiro (loan)	64	(0)
2016–2018	América Mineiro	132	(0)
2019–2021	Chapecoense	76	(0)
2021–2022	Ceará	48	(0)
2023–	Fortaleza	186	(0)
- * Club domestic league appearances and goals as of 21 October 2026

João Ricardo Riedi (born 6 September 1988), known as João Ricardo, is a Brazilian footballer who plays as a goalkeeper for Fortaleza.

== Club career ==
Born in Mariano Moro, Rio Grande do Sul, João Ricardo made his senior debut while at Concórdia in 2008. He moved to Brusque shortly after, being regularly used during his two-year spell.

In 2010 João Ricardo joined Goiânia, but returned to his previous club later in the year. He went on to appear with Brusque in 2011 Campeonato Brasileiro Série C, as a starter.

On 1 August 2012 João Ricardo signed for Paysandu, after a brief stint at Marcílio Dias.

On 12 December 2012 João Ricardo moved to Veranópolis. After being an undisputed starter, he joined Icasa.

On 4 January 2014, João Ricardo signed for Paraná, also in the second level. On 8 June of that year, he moved to fellow league team América Mineiro, achieving promotion to Série A in 2015.

On 2 January 2019, João Ricardo joined Chapecoense on a two-year deal, as a replacement to Genoa-bound Jandrei. In April, he was suspended until further notice after testing positive in a doping exam.

== Career statistics ==
As of 8 December 2024

Club	Season	League			State League		Cup		Continental		Other		Total	
Club	Season	Division	Apps	Goals	Apps	Goals	Apps	Goals	Apps	Goals	Apps	Goals	Apps	Goals
Brusque	2011	Série D	8	0	14	0	0	0	—		—		22	0
Brusque	2012	Catarinense	—		18	0	—		—		—		18	0
Brusque	Total		8	0	32	0	0	0	—		—		40	0
Paysandu	2012	Série C	8	0	—		—		—		—		8	0
Veranópolis	2013	Gaúcho	—		17	0	2	0	—		—		19	0
Icasa	2013	Série B	32	0	—		—		—		—		34	0
Paraná	2014	Série B	1	0	0	0	0	0	—		—		1	0
América Mineiro	2014	Série B	16	0	—		—		—		—		16	0
América Mineiro	2015	Série B	37	0	11	0	3	0	—		—		51	0
América Mineiro	2016	Série A	35	0	15	0	5	0	—		3	0	58	0
América Mineiro	2017	Série B	34	0	13	0	2	0	—		3	0	52	0
América Mineiro	2018	Série A	28	0	7	0	2	0	—		—		37	0
América Mineiro	Total		150	0	46	0	12	0	—		6	0	214	0
Chapecoense	2019	Série A	13	0	11	0	3	0	2	0	—		29	0
Chapecoense	2020	Série B	38	0	14	0	—		—		—		52	0
Chapecoense	Total		51	0	25	0	3	0	2	0	—		81	0
Ceará	2021	Série A	13	0	4	0	—		1	0	0	0	18	0
Ceará	2022	Série A	35	0	2	0	6	0	7	0	7	0	57	0
Ceará	Total		48	0	6	0	6	0	8	0	7	0	75	0
Fortaleza	2023	Série A	32	0	2	0	2	0	11	0	3	0	50	0
Fortaleza	2024	Série A	38	0	9	0	4	0	10	0	9	0	70	0
Fortaleza	Total		70	0	11	0	6	0	21	0	12	0	120	0
Career total			368	0	137	0	29	0	31	0	25	0	590	0

== Honours ==
América Mineiro

- Campeonato Mineiro: 2016
- Campeonato Brasileiro Série B: 2017

Chapecoense

- Campeonato Catarinense: 2020
- Campeonato Brasileiro Série B: 2020

Fortaleza

- Campeonato Cearense: 2023, 2026
- Copa do Nordeste: 2024
