= Unimed =

Unimed may refer to:

- Unimed (organization), a Brazilian medical work cooperative and health insurance operator
- Unimed S.A., a Swiss biomedical engineering company
- Unione delle Università del Mediterraneo or Mediterranean Universities Union
- UNIMED, abbreviation for the State University of Medan in Indonesia
- UniMed or Universal Medicine, an esoteric healing and occult organization in Australia and the UK
- UNIMED, abbreviation for the University Of Medical Sciences in Ondo City, Ondo State, Nigeria. unimed.edu.ng
