= Fernando Seabra =

Brazilian football manager (born 1977)

Personal information
- Full name: Fernando Seabra
- Date of birth: 19 June 1977 (age 49)
- Place of birth: São Paulo, Brazil

Managerial career
- Years: Team
- 2006: Assisense (assistant)
- 2007–2008: Grêmio Barueri (assistant)
- 2008–2009: PAEC U20
- 2009–2010: Red Bull Brasil U17
- 2011–2013: Red Bull Brasil U20
- 2013: Red Bull Brasil (assistant)
- 2013: Red Bull Brasil
- 2018–2019: Corinthians U20 (assistant)
- 2020–2021: Athletico Paranaense U17
- 2021–2022: Desportivo Brasil U20
- 2022: Desportivo Brasil
- 2022–2024: Cruzeiro U20
- 2023: Cruzeiro (interim)
- 2024: Red Bull Bragantino II
- 2024: Cruzeiro
- 2024–2025: Red Bull Bragantino
- 2026: Coritiba

Fernando Seabra (born 19 June 1977) is a Brazilian football coach.

== Career ==
=== Early career ===
Born in São Paulo, Seabra began his career as an assistant coach of Assisense in 2006. He later worked at Grêmio Barueri under the same role, before taking over the youth sides of PAEC and Red Bull Brasil.

On 8 June 2013, Seabra was named head coach of RB for the year's Copa Paulista. He later worked in the staff of other clubs in his native state, before becoming a development analyst at Ceará in January 2015.

Between 2016 and 2017, Seabra was a coordinator of Santos' B-team, being dismissed in April 2017. Later in that year, he joined Corinthians as a youth coordinator, being later an assistant of Eduardo Barroca in the under-20 team.

In February 2020, Seabra left Timão to join Athletico Paranaense as an under-17 coach. He moved to Desportivo Brasil in the following year, being initially an under-20 coach before taking over the main squad on 14 December 2021.

On 28 February 2022, Seabra left DB on a mutual agreement. and was announced as an under-20 coach of Cruzeiro on 8 March. On 29 August 2023, he was named interim head coach of the first team, replacing sacked Pepa.

Seabra coached the Raposa in a 0–0 home draw against Red Bull Bragantino on 3 September 2023, and returned to his former role two days later after the appointment of Zé Ricardo. In November, he was Paulo Autuori's assistant in the last rounds of the season.

On 30 January 2024, Seabra was announced as Red Bull Bragantino II head coach.

=== Cruzeiro ===
On 9 April 2024, Seabra returned to Cruzeiro, now being named head coach of the main squad. He remained in charge after the club's change of ownership, but was criticized by new owner Pedro Lourenço in July 2024 in a leaked audio.

Seabra was sacked on 23 September 2024, after a 0–0 home draw against Cuiabá,

=== Red Bull Bragantino ===
Seabra returned to Bragantino on 31 October 2024, now as head coach of the main squad. He managed to avoid relegation in the last round, and remained in charge for the 2025 season.

On 27 October 2025, Seabra was dismissed by Bragantino after a poor run of form.

=== Coritiba ===
On 8 December 2025, Seabra was announced as head coach of Coritiba for the upcoming season. He was sacked on 27 October 2026, after seven winless matches.

== Managerial statistics ==
As of 28 October 2026.

Managerial record by team and tenure
Team	Nat	From	To	Record								Ref
Team	Nat	From	To	G	W	D	L	GF	GA	GD	Win %	Ref
Red Bull Brasil	(Brazil)	8 June 2013	8 September 2013	12	2	4	6	4	11	−7	16.67	
Desportivo Brasil	(Brazil)	14 December 2021	28 February 2022	9	1	4	4	8	10	−2	11.11	
Cruzeiro (interim)	(Brazil)	29 August 2023	5 September 2023	1	0	1	0	0	0	+0	0.00	
Red Bull Bragantino II	(Brazil)	28 January 2024	9 April 2024	15	8	2	5	26	20	+6	53.33	
Cruzeiro	(Brazil)	9 April 2024	23 September 2024	35	17	8	10	46	32	+14	48.57	
Red Bull Bragantino	(Brazil)	31 October 2024	27 October 2025	56	18	14	24	66	76	−10	32.14	
Coritiba	(Brazil)	8 December 2025	27 October 2026	42	14	13	15	48	58	−10	33.33	
Total				170	60	46	64	198	207	−9	35.29	—

== Honours ==
Cruzeiro U20

- Campeonato Mineiro Sub-20: 2023
- Copa do Brasil Sub-20: 2023
