= Rafael Paiva =

Brazilian football coach (born 1984)

Personal information
- Full name: Cledson Rafael de Paiva
- Date of birth: 26 August 1984 (age 42)
- Place of birth: Cambuí, Brazil

Team information
- Current team: Atlético Mineiro U17 (head coach)

Managerial career
- Years: Team
- 2013: Mogi Mirim U15
- 2014: Desportivo Brasil U15
- 2015–2018: São Paulo U15
- 2018–2020: São Paulo U17
- 2021: Vasco da Gama U17
- 2022: Palmeiras U15
- 2022–2023: Palmeiras U17
- 2024: Vasco da Gama U20
- 2024: Vasco da Gama (interim)
- 2024: Vasco da Gama (interim)
- 2025–2026: Club América (assistant)
- 2026–: Atlético Mineiro U17

Cledson Rafael de Paiva (born 26 August 1984) is a Brazilian football coach, currently the head coach of Atlético Mineiro's under-17 team.

== Career ==
Born in Cambuí, Minas Gerais, Paiva began his career as a fitness coach at Guarani before becoming an under-15 coach at Mogi Mirim in 2013. He subsequently worked under the same role at Desportivo Brasil and São Paulo, before being named in charge of the latter's under-17 team in March 2018.

On 2 November 2021, after a period in China, Paiva was named under-17 coach of Vasco da Gama. He left the club on 11 January of the following year, and was announced at Palmeiras the following day, as an under-15 coach.

In March 2022, Paiva was promoted to Palmeiras' under-17 side, and led the side to two consecutive Campeonato Brasileiro Sub-17 and Copa do Brasil Sub-17 titles. On 23 January 2024, he returned to Vasco after being named in charge of the under-20 squad.

On 27 April 2024, Paiva was named interim head coach of Vasco, after the departure of Ramón Díaz. He led the club in four matches (which included a qualification in the 2024 Copa do Brasil) before returning to his previous role after the appointment of Álvaro Pacheco on 21 May; on 20 June, however, he returned to an interim role, after Pacheco was sacked.

On 24 November 2024, Paiva was sacked from Vasco during a press conference by club president Pedrinho. In May 2025, he moved to Mexico and worked as an assistant to compatriot André Jardine, before returning to his home country on 2 February 2026 after being named head coach of the under-17 team of Atlético Mineiro.

== Managerial statistics ==
As of match played 24 November 2024

Managerial record by team and tenure
Team	Nat	From	To	Record							
Team	Nat	From	To	G	W	D	L	GF	GA	GD	Win %
Vasco da Gama (interim)	(Brazil)	30 April 2024	20 May 2024	4	1	2	1	5	5	+0	25.00
Vasco da Gama (interim)	(Brazil)	21 June 2024	24 November 2024	31	12	8	11	37	39	−2	38.71
Career total				35	13	10	12	42	44	−2	37.14

== Honours ==
São Paulo U17

- Campeonato Paulista Sub-17: 2019

Palmeiras U17

- Campeonato Brasileiro Sub-17: 2022, 2023
- Campeonato Paulista Sub-17: 2022
- Copa do Brasil Sub-17: 2022, 2023
