= Héctor Bustamante (footballer) =

Paraguayan footballer (born 1995)

Personal information
- Full name: Héctor Ariel Bustamante López
- Date of birth: 31 March 1995 (age 31)
- Place of birth: Encarnación, Paraguay
- Height: 1.66 m (5 ft 5 1/2 in)
- Position: Forward

Team information
- Current team: Pelotas

Senior career*
Years	Team	Apps	(Gls)
2014	3 de Febrero	13	(0)
2015–2017	Club Nacional	46	(5)
2016–2017	→ Rubio Ñu (loan)	20	(0)
2018	3 de Febrero	16	(0)
2019–2020	Novo Hamburgo	0	(0)
2019	→ Atlético Goianiense (loan)	9	(0)
2019	→ CSA (loan)	19	(1)
2020	→ Operário Ferroviário (loan)	13	(1)
2020	→ CSA (loan)	2	(0)
2021–	Pelotas	8	(0)
- * Club domestic league appearances and goals as of 5 September 2020

Héctor Ariel Bustamante López (born 31 March 1995) is a Paraguayan footballer who plays as a forward for Pelotas.

== Career ==
=== Novo Hamburgo ===
==== Atlético Goianiense (loan) ====
On 30 April 2019 Atlético Goianiense signed Bustamante on loan from Novo Hamburgo.

==== CSA (loan) ====
On 6 August 2019 CSA signed Bustamante on loan from Novo Hamburgo until the end of 2019 Série A season.
