= Unimed S.A. =

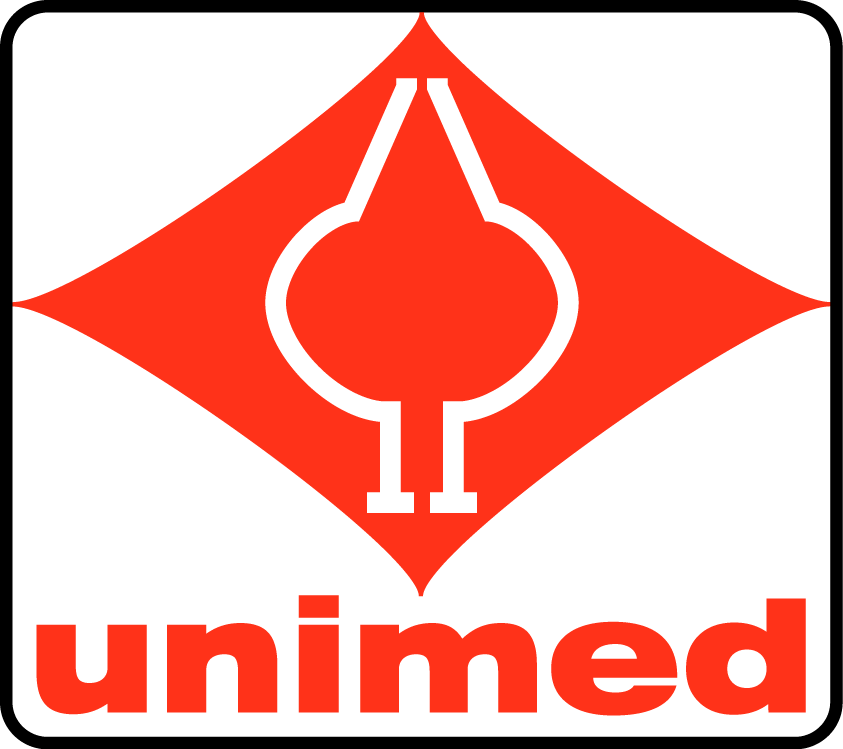
- Company type: Société Anonyme
- Industry: Biomedical engineering
- Founded: P.-J. Guisan S.A. (1936); Intramed S.A. (1946); Unimed S.A. (1958)
- Founder: Karl Schoenholzer
- Headquarters: Lausanne, Switzerland
- Area served: Worldwide
- Key people: Karl Schoenholzer (Founder); Patrick Schoenholzer (CEO)
- Products: Needles and medical needles, connectors and stopcocks, stainless steel tube contract manufacturing
- Number of employees: ▲120 (2012)
- Website: www.unimed.ch

Unimed is a Swiss company active in the biomedical engineering field. It fabricates and sells a large range of medical and diagnostics needles. Its headquarters are in Lausanne, Switzerland. Since 1958, its logo represents a medical needle hub and was created by the founder Mr. Karl Schoenholzer.

== Historical Introduction ==
In 1936, Mr. Pierre-Jean Guisan, son of a medical doctor and nephew of the famous Swiss general Guisan, started the production of hypodermic needles in the cellar of a building on Avenue de Cour, Lausanne, Switzerland. After a while, he found more appropriate production facilities on Rue de Genève, Lausanne. The newly founded company was named P.-J. Guisan S.A. and produced hypodermic needles for dentists and medical doctors.

At that time, the tubes used for the production of the needles were imported but during World War II, the supply became complicated and Mr. Guisan contacted a French company in order to eventually obtain, in 1944, the stainless steel tube drawing process know-how required for the production of needles.

At the same time, the company Wander S.A. became interested in purchasing and increasing the export sales of Swiss companies active in the medical field. They showed interest in both P.-J. Guisan S.A and a syringe-producing company, while helping Mr.Guisan in his efforts to produce stainless steel tubes.

The company Wander S.A. acquired 50% of the shares of P.-J. Guisan S.A. and Microtube S.A., also founded by Mr.Guisan in 1944 for the stainless steel tube drawing activity.

In 1946, Mr.Künzli, in charge of the medical department from Wander S.A. founded a company named Intramed S.A. in Bern, and acquired all the shares previously acquired by Wander S.A. Unfortunately, the results were not up to the ambitions of Mr.Künzli and in 1950, the company went out of business.

At that time, a business company in Lausanne, Socorex S.A., was interested in purchasing shares in the medical industry, Therefore, it bought the trademarks, the activity and half of the shares of P.-J. Guisan S.A.. The other half, held by Mr.Guisan himself, was acquired at the same time. Socorex also took out the options on the shares from Microtube and the syringe-producing company Isba Instruments Scientifiques S.A., in Bassecourt. As Socorex took on the activity of Intramed, the focus was on needles and syringes. The production of the other products were gradually abandoned, as the syringes and needles from Socorex gained worldwide reputation.

In 1954, the owners of Socorex S.A. decided to sell this activity to a new company named Socorex Instruments Medicaux S.A., led by Mr.Hertig and Mr. Karl Schoenholzer, who was an authorized representative from Socorex. This company took on the activity of Socorex S.A. in the same facilities, and focused even more on needles and syringes. At that time, about 70-80% of the syringes and needles produced in Switzerland by the company were sold for export.

In 1958, Mr. Hertig and Mr. Schoenholzer decided to split up. It was decided that Mr. Hertig, owner of the syringe production activity, would keep the syringe field from Socorex Instruments Médicaux S.A., which later would become Socorex-Isba S.A.

Mr. Karl Schoenholzer took on the production and the sale for export of the needles under a new company name, Unimed S.A.

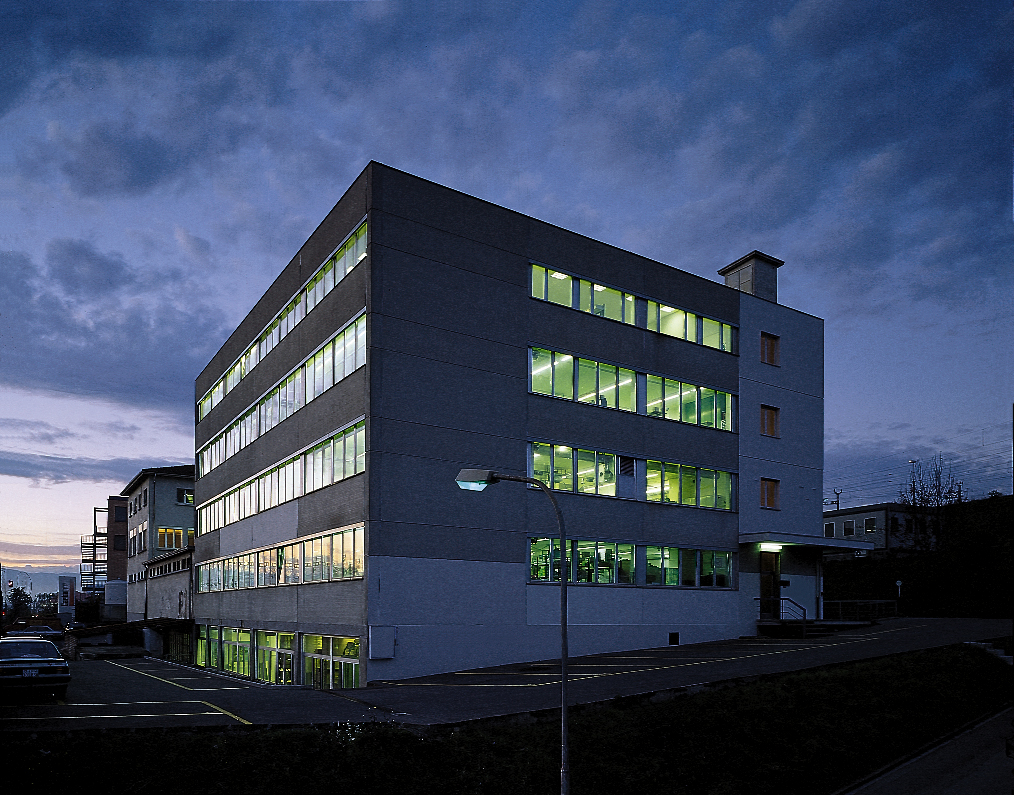
Unimed S.A. headquarters in Lausanne

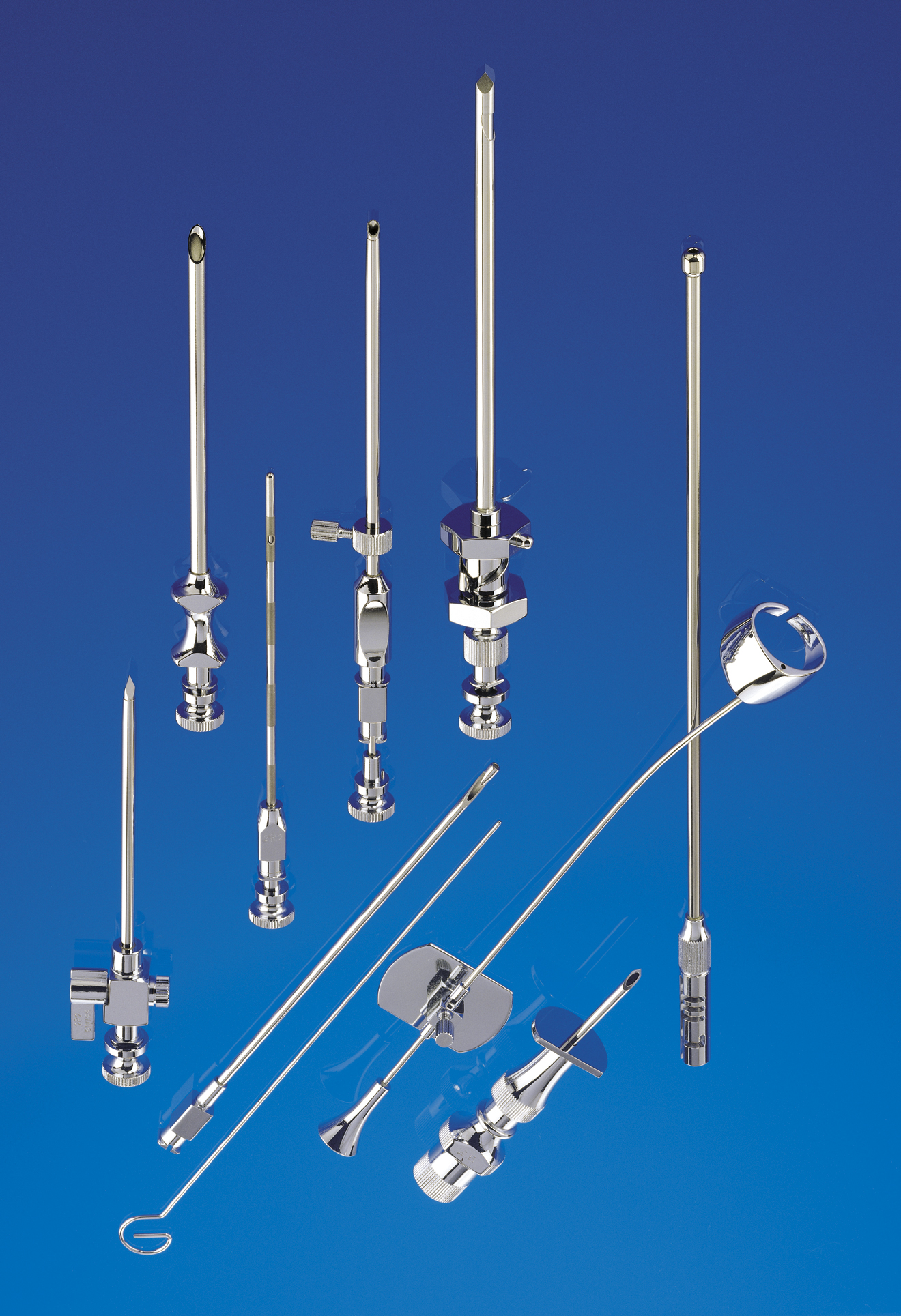
Medical devices produced by Unimed S.A.

== History ==
Unimed focused even more on the field of medical needles and developed the production of surgical needles that had been started in 1951 by Socorex S.A.. Additionally, the sales program of the medical needles was developed and the field of veterinary needles was added to the production. The needles that were produced according to several models and dimensions, were sold by authorized retailers in Switzerland and abroad.

In 1981, Mr. Patrick Schoenholzer, son of Mr. Karl Schoenholzer, a graduate engineer from ETH Lausanne was hired by the company. At the time the increasing cost of cleaning and reconditioning of reusable needles as well as fears about the emerging AIDS virus, led to a rapid decline of sales of standard Unimed brand products. It was therefore decided to reorient the company's activity to contract manufacturing by making available its know-how in the stainless steel tube forming process. Contract manufacturing as well as the supply of stainless steel tubing positioned Unimed as a key supplier to the medical device and diagnostics industries.

Currently Unimed serves more than 1,500 clients in 70 countries. Contract manufacturing has become a major business for the company, which is producing a large number of finished and semi-finished products for its clients who eventually place them on the market under their own brand name.

== Bibliography ==
- H. Rieben et al., "Portraits de 250 entreprises vaudoises", 1980, p. 136-137, ISBN 2-8265-0038-4
