= Jacozinho =

Brazilian footballer

Personal information
- Full name: Givaldo Santos Vasconcelos
- Date of birth: 2 February 1956 (age 70)
- Place of birth: Gararu, Brazil
- Height: 1.65 m (5 ft 5 in)
- Position: Winger

Youth career
- Vasco-SE

Senior career*
Years	Team	Apps	(Gls)
1976–1977	Vasco-SE		
1977	Sergipe		
1978–1980	Galícia		
1978	→ Jequié (loan)		
1979–1980	→ Leônico (loan)	?	(5)
1980–1985	CSA	?	(12)
1983	→ Corinthians PP (loan)		
1985–1988	Santa Cruz	?	(3)
1987	→ CSA (loan)		
1987	→ Nacional-AM (loan)		
1988	→ Baraúnas (loan)		
1989	ABC		
1989	Rio Branco-AC		
1990	Imperatriz		
1991–1993	Flamengo-PI		
1994	Ypiranga-PE		

Managerial career
- 2012–2015: CSA U20 (assistant)
- 2015–: CSA (assistant)
- 2015–2017: CSA U20
- 2017: CSA (interim)
- 2018: CSA (interim)
- 2019: CSA (interim)
- * Club domestic league appearances and goals

Givaldo Santos Vasconcelos (born 2 February 1956), commonly known as Jacozinho, is a Brazilian retired footballer who played as a winger.

== Playing career ==
Jacozinho was born in Gararu, Sergipe, and started his career with Vasco-SE in 1976. In the following year, he moved to neighbouring Sergipe, playing his first national championship and later representing clubs in the state of Bahia.

In late 1980, Jacozinho joined CSA. There, he featured regularly as the club finished second in the Série B three times and won the Campeonato Alagoano five times, and was somehow invited to Zico's friendly in 1985, celebrated due to his return to Flamengo; he was included in the Amigos do Zico (Zico's Friends) squad. In that match, he scored the only goal of Zico's team, after receiving a pass from Diego Maradona; the match ended 3–1 for Flamengo.

After gaining national notoriety due to the friendly goal, Jacozinho joined Santa Cruz, He came back to CSA in 1987, and subsequently represented Nacional-AM, Baraúnas, ABC, Rio Branco-AC, Imperatriz, Flamengo-PI and Ypiranga-PE, retiring in 1994.

== Post-playing career ==
Jacozinho also worked as Magno Malta's advisor for a nearly 15 years before charging him for mobbing. In 2012, he returned to his main club CSA, as an assistant manager of the youth sides.

In 2015, Jacozinho became an assistant manager of the main squad, being also manager of the under-20s and interim manager on two occasions in 2017 and 2018. On 30 November 2019, after Argel Fucks left for Ceará, he was named interim manager for the latter three matches of the Série A.

== Honours ==
CSA

- Campeonato Alagoano: 1980, 1981, 1982 e 1984

Santa Cruz

- Campeonato Pernambucano: 1986
