= Cambuí, Minas Gerais =

Coordinates: 22°36′43″S 46°03′28″W

Cambuí
- Municipality
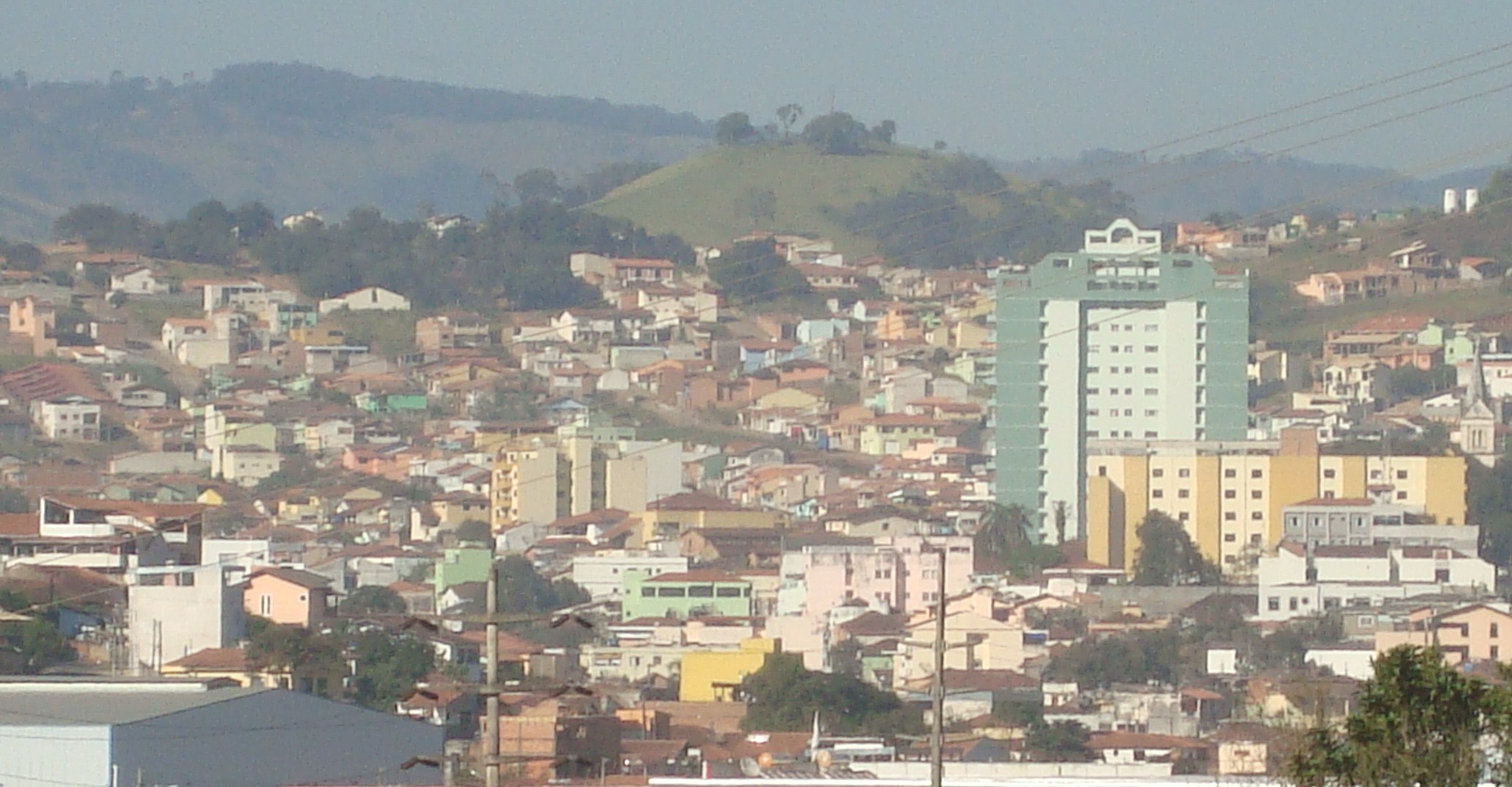
- View of Cambuí

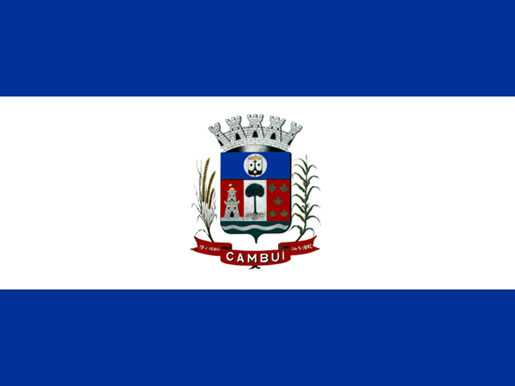
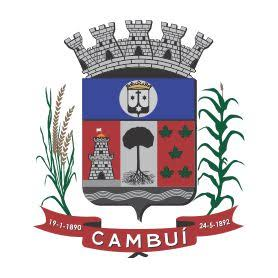
- Flag Coat of arms
- Country: Brazil
- Region: Southeast
- State: Minas Gerais
- Mesoregion: Sud/Sudoeste de Minas

Population (2020)
  - Total: 29,814
- Time zone: UTC -3

Cambuí is a municipality in the state of Minas Gerais in the Southeast region of Brazil.

== See also ==
- List of municipalities in Minas Gerais
