= Ricardo Colbachini =

Brazilian football manager

Personal information
- Full name: Ricardo Colbachini
- Date of birth: 23 March 1985 (age 41)
- Place of birth: Caxias do Sul, Brazil

Youth career
- Years: Team
- 1992–2002: Juventude

Managerial career
- 2003–2007: Juventude (youth)
- 2007–2010: Grêmio U15
- 2010: Internacional U15
- 2011–2012: Caxias (assistant)
- 2011: Caxias (interim)
- 2012: Caxias (interim)
- 2013: Juventude U20
- 2013: Juventude (assistant)
- 2013–2014: Internacional U17
- 2015–2020: Internacional B
- 2019: Internacional (interim)
- 2020–2021: Pelotas
- 2021: Gama
- 2021: Lugano (assistant)
- 2022: Fluminense (assistant)
- 2022: Avaí (assistant)
- 2023–2024: Primavera
- 2024: Cuiabá (assistant)
- 2024: Cuiabá (interim)
- 2025: Rio Branco-ES

Ricardo Colbachini (born 23 March 1985) is a Brazilian football coach.

== Career ==
Colbachini was born in Caxias do Sul, Rio Grande do Sul, and quit his playing career at the age of 17 after "not seeing himself as a distinct player". He then started his coaching career at Juventude, club he was representing as a player, as a head coach of the under-13s.

Colbachini was subsequently in charge of Grêmio and Internacional's under-15 sides before being appointed Lisca's assistant at Caxias in 2011. In April of that year, after Lisca's successor Luiz Carlos Ferreira was sacked, he was appointed interim head coach. At the age of just 26, he became the youngest head coach of the Copa do Brasil when his side defeated Botafogo-PB.

On 3 January 2013, Colbachini returned to Juventude, again being named Lisca's assistant. On 25 October, he moved back to Inter and was appointed in charge of the under-17 squad.

In May 2015, Colbachini took over Internacional's B-team, replacing fired Clemer. On 10 October 2019, after the dismissal of Odair Hellmann, he was appointed interim head coach of the first team; his first professional match occurred three days later, a 0–0 home draw against Santos for the Série A championship.

On 20 October 2019, after the appointment of Zé Ricardo as head coach of the first team, Colbachini returned to his previous role with the reserve team. On 24 April of the following year, he was named Pelotas head coach.

Sacked by Pelotas on 26 March 2021, Colbachini was named at the helm of Gama on 25 May, but left on 12 June to become Abel Braga's assistant at Swiss side FC Lugano. The duo were dismissed by the latter on 1 September, however.

Colbachini followed Braga to Fluminense, also as his assistant, and later reunited with Lisca at Avaí on 19 September 2022 under the same role. The duo left the latter on 24 October, and Colbachini was appointed in charge of Primavera on 10 November.

On 1 February 2024, Colbachini left Primavera by mutual consent, and subsequently moved to Cuiabá as an assistant. On 29 April, after interim head coach Luiz Fernando Iubel resigned, he was named interim of the club himself.
