= Yeferson Rodallega =

Colombian footballer

Personal information
- Full name: Yefferson Andrés Rodallega Paz
- Date of birth: 23 November 2000 (age 25)
- Place of birth: Cali, Colombia
- Height: 1.78 m (5 ft 10 in)
- Position: Left-back

Team information
- Current team: Once Caldas (on loan from Envigado)

Youth career
- Envigado

Senior career*
Years	Team	Apps	(Gls)
2020–	Envigado	93	(2)
2024	→ Atlético Goianiense (loan)	7	(0)
2025	→ Independiente Medellín (loan)	17	(0)
2026	→ Once Caldas (loan)	0	(0)
- * Club domestic league appearances and goals as of 11 December 2025

Yeferson Andrés Rodallega Paz (born 23 November 2000) is a Colombian footballer who plays as a left-back for Once Caldas, on loan from Envigado.

== Career ==
Born in Cali, Rodallega was an Envigado youth graduate. He made his first team – and Categoría Primera A – debut on 10 October 2020, coming on as a late substitute for Yadir Meneses in a 1–1 away draw against Deportivo Pereira.

Rodallega was definitely promoted to the main squad for the 2021 season, and became a regular starter in the following year. He scored his first professional goal on 21 July 2023, netting a last-minute equalizer in a 1–1 away draw against La Equidad.

On 13 February 2024, Rodallega moved abroad for the first time in his career, after being announced at Campeonato Brasileiro Série A side Atlético Goianiense on a one-year loan deal, with a buyout clause.

== Career statistics ==
As of 15 February 2024

Club	Season	League			Cup		Continental		State league		Other		Total	
Club	Season	Division	Apps	Goals	Apps	Goals	Apps	Goals	Apps	Goals	Apps	Goals	Apps	Goals
Envigado	2020	Categoría Primera A	3	0	0	0	—		—		—		3	0
Envigado	2021	Categoría Primera A	21	0	2	0	—		—		—		23	0
Envigado	2022	Categoría Primera A	32	0	1	0	—		—		—		33	0
Envigado	2023	Categoría Primera A	35	2	1	0	—		—		—		36	2
Envigado	2024	Categoría Primera A	2	0	0	0	—		—		—		2	0
Envigado	Total		93	2	4	0	—		—		—		97	2
Atlético Goianiense (loan)	2024	Série A	0	0	0	0	—		0	0	—		0	0
Career total			93	2	4	0	0	0	0	0	0	0	97	2
