= Emerson Cris =

Brazilian football manager (born 1978)

Personal information
- Full name: Emerson Cris Hartkopp
- Date of birth: 22 January 1978 (age 48)
- Place of birth: Curitiba, Brazil
- Height: 1.78 m (5 ft 10 in)
- Position: Defensive midfielder

Youth career
- Paraná

Senior career*
Years	Team	Apps	(Gls)
1997–2003	Paraná		
1997	→ Grêmio Maringá (loan)		
2004	Criciúma	0	(0)
2004	Sport		
2005	Gama		
2005	Al-Sharjah		
2006–2007	Joinville		
2007–2008	Bahia		
2009–2010	Chapecoense	4	(1)
2011–2012	Anapolina	10	(0)
2013	CRAC	3	(0)

Managerial career
- 2014–2017: Chapecoense (youth)
- 2016: Chapecoense (interim)
- 2017–2019: Chapecoense (assistant)
- 2017: Chapecoense (interim)
- 2019: Chapecoense (interim)
- 2019: Chapecoense (interim)
- 2020–2021: Concórdia
- 2022: Próspera
- 2023: Chapecoense U20
- 2023: Chapecoense (assistant)
- 2023: Chapecoense (interim)
- 2024: Galo Maringá
- 2024: Concórdia
- 2025: Azuriz
- 2025: Brasil de Pelotas
- 2026: Galo Maringá
- 2026: Marcílio Dias
- * Club domestic league appearances and goals

Emerson Cris Hartkopp (born 22 January 1978), known as Emerson Cris or simply Emerson, is a Brazilian football coach and former player who played as a defensive midfielder.

== Career ==
Born in Curitiba, Paraná, Emerson finished his formation with Paraná and started his senior career while on loan at Grêmio Maringá in 1997. Upon returning, he started to feature sparingly with the first team in the Série A.

Emerson left the club in December 2003, and failed to settle with any club in the remainder of his career. He represented Criciúma, Sport, Gama, Al-Sharjah, Joinville, Bahia, Chapecoense, Anapolina and CRAC; he retired with the latter in 2013.

Emerson returned to Chapecoense in 2014, as a manager of the under-20 squad. He became the assistant manager of the main squad in 2017, and after the dismissal of Vinícius Eutrópio in September of that year, he was named manager in an interim manner.

In March 2019, after the sacking of Claudinei Oliveira, Emerson was again interim, but returned to his previous role shortly after the appointment of Ney Franco.
