= Mariano Moro =

Municipality in Rio Grande do Sul, Brazil

Coordinates: 27°21′14″S 52°08′49″W

- Municipality
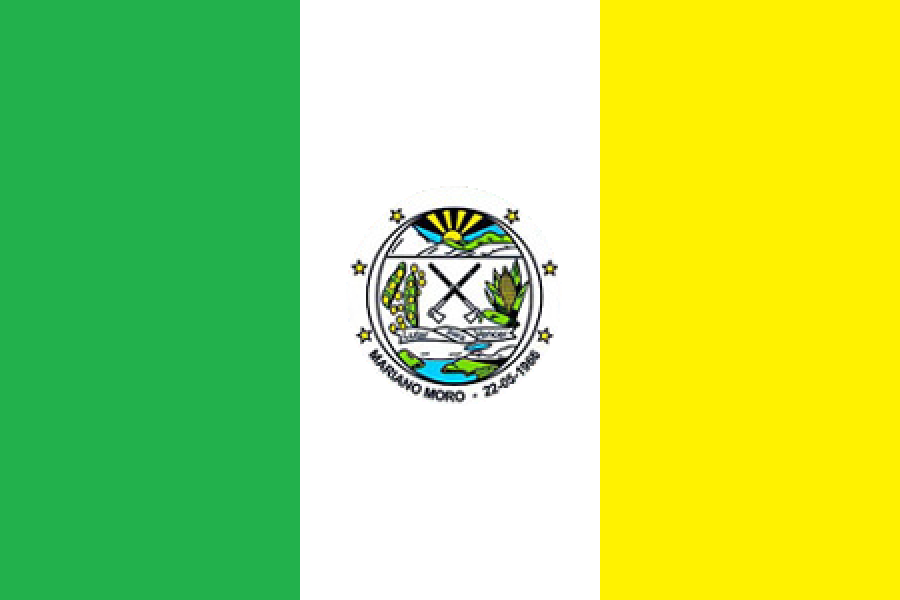
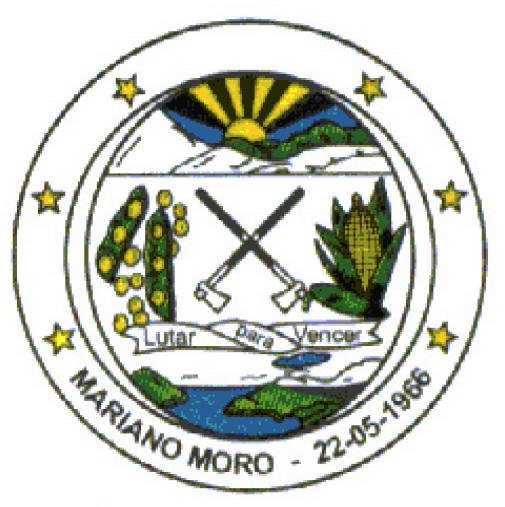
- Flag Coat of arms
- Interactive map of Mariano Moro
- Country: Brazil
- Time zone: UTC−3 (BRT)

Mariano Moro is a municipality in the state of Rio Grande do Sul, Brazil.

== Geography ==
It belongs to the Northwest Grandense Mesoregion River and the Erechim Microregion. It is a municipality that includes the waters of the Uruguay River and is fluvial border with the state of Santa Catarina. As of 2020, the estimated population was 2,009.

== See also ==
- List of municipalities in Rio Grande do Sul
