= Universidade do Extremo Sul Catarinense =

University in Santa Catarina, Brazil

Coordinates: 28.7013°S 49.4084°W

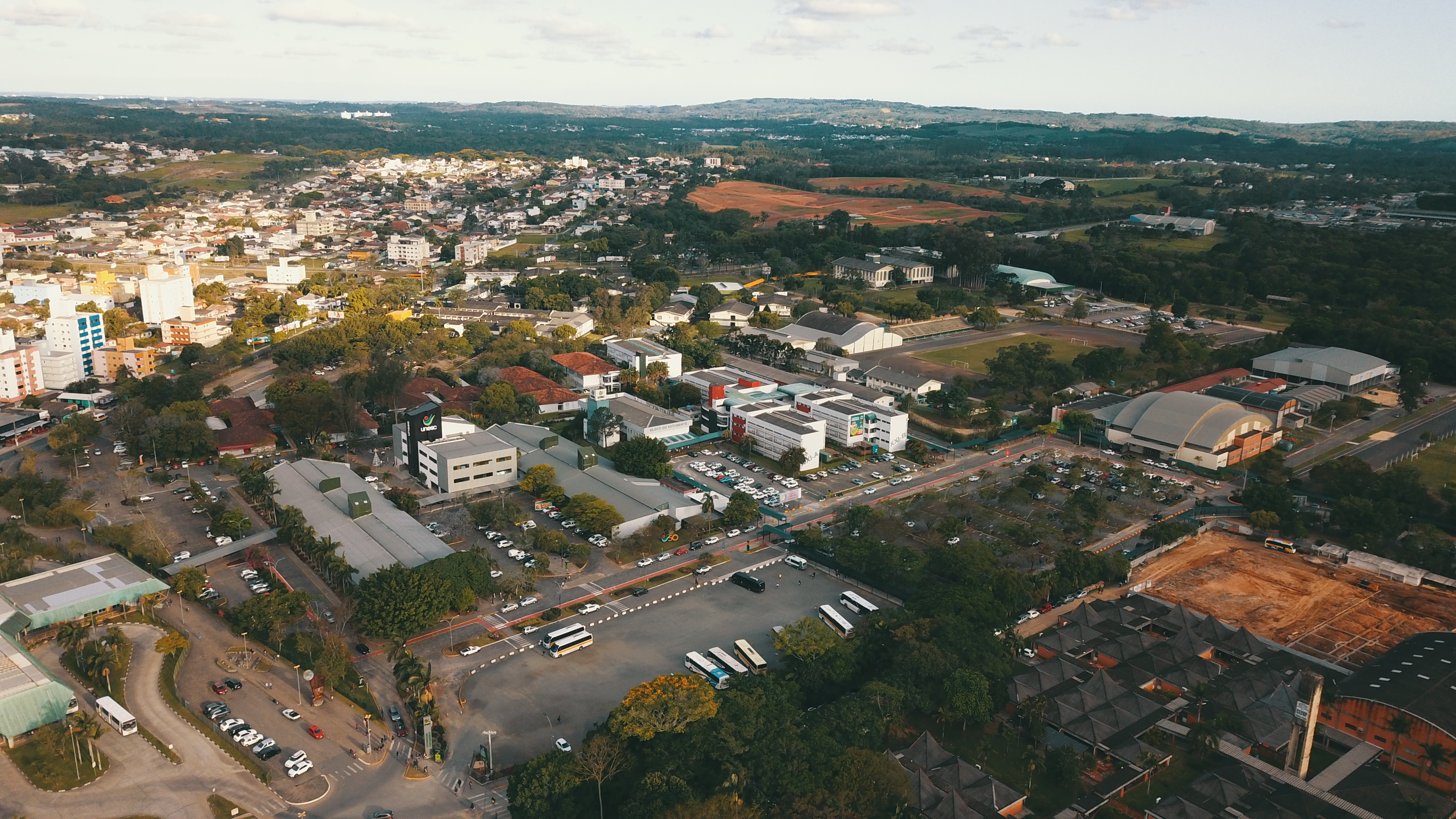
- Type: Community
- Established: 1968
- Rector: Luciane Bisognin Ceretta
- Administrative staff: 513
- Undergraduates: 10.256
- Postgraduates: 9.174
- Location: Criciúma, Santa Catarina, Brazil
- Campus: Urban
- Website: www.unesc.net

The Universidade do Extremo Sul Catarinense (Unesc) is a community university, located in the municipality of Criciúma, in the southern part of Santa Catarina, Brazil. It works through education, research and extension in different areas of knowledge. It was the first institution of higher education to be deployed in the southern state of Santa Catarina.

The current dean of UNESC is Luciane Bisognin Ceretta, elected in 2017 by the academic community.
