= Unimed (organization) =

Brazilian medical work cooperative and health insurance operator

- Type: Cooperative
- Industry: Managed healthcare; Insurance
- Founded: November 28, 1975; 50 years ago
- Headquarters: São Paulo, São Paulo, Brazil
- Area served: Brazil
- Key people: Omar Abujamra Junior (president)
- Services: Healthcare services; Health insurance; Health care provider
- Net income: ▲ R$271.1 million (2023)
- Total equity: ▲ R$520.4 million (2023)
- Number of employees: c. 136,000 (2022)
- Website: www.unimed.coop.br

Confederação Nacional das Cooperativas Médicas (in English: National Confederation of Medical Cooperatives), commonly known as Unimed, is a Brazilian medical work cooperative and health insurance operator. It is considered the largest of its kind in the world, with more than 115,000 affiliated physicians, 386 branches and more than 15 million beneficiaries. Its name is a composite of união and médicos (Portuguese for "union" and "physicians").

Created as an alternative against capital-based health plans, the cooperative was founded in 1967 in the city of Santos, state of São Paulo, by Dr. Luiz Camargo Barbosa and 22 more doctors.

Unimed operates as a physician-owned cooperative. This means doctors hold a dual role: they are both members of the cooperative and providers of healthcare services. While some staff, like auditors or on-call personnel, may be salaried employees, the majority are members. The compensation of member physicians is directly tied to their production, which is typically determined by the quantity and type of procedures they perform.

According to the World Cooperative Monitor 2023 Report, Unimed had 135,000 employees and $15.61 billion in revenue in 2021. Unimed's website states that 143 thousand jobs are generated by the Unimed system, implying the cooperative has seen employment growth since the World Cooperative Monitor's report was released. Notably, the report identified Unimed as a worker cooperative, meaning it may surpass the Mondragon Corporation as the largest worker cooperative in the world.

== History ==
With the purpose to guarantee the freedom and dignity of healthy professionals and structure improvements needed by the sector at finish of 1960 decade, a doctors group affiliated to Santos Doctors Sindicate (Sindicato dos Médicos de Santos), in Sao Paulo State, sought in cooperativism an alternative model of Management based on ethics, without aim of profit and with an emphasis on the social role of medicine.

That is why, on December 18, 1967, Luiz Camargo Barbosa and 22 other doctors founded the Union of Doctors – Unimed, with Camargo Barbosa as the first president.

The board of Unimed Santos went to visit cities interested in adopting the model of cooperativism and soon the Unimed expanded, first by the interior of the State and then for the rest of the Country.

To organize institutionally all the federations and Single companies, which began to be created at the beginning of the decade, the Unimed of Brazil was founded on November 28, 1975, during a meeting of members.
