= Zé Ricardo =

Brazilian footballer

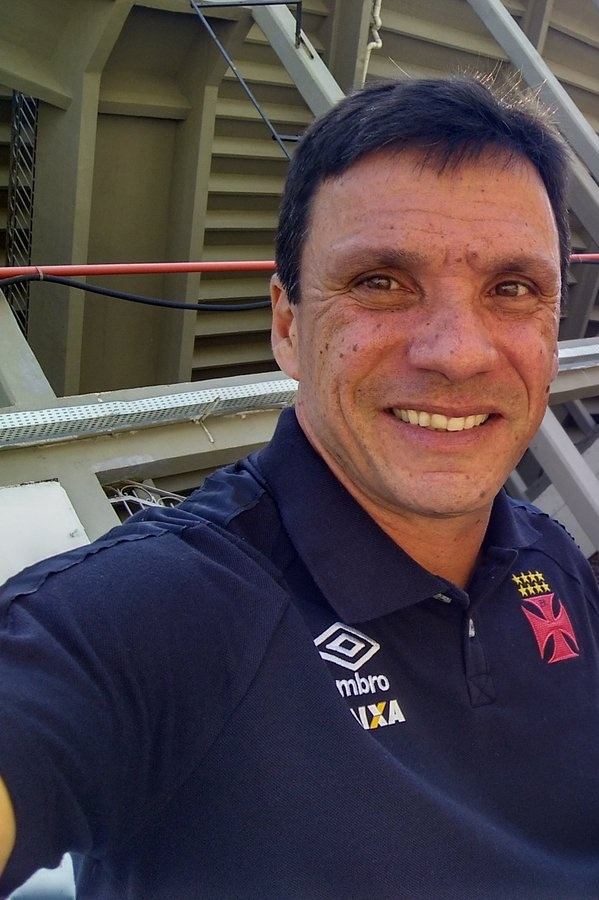
- Zé Ricardo in 2017

Personal information
- Full name: José Ricardo Mannarino
- Date of birth: 5 June 1971 (age 55)
- Place of birth: Rio de Janeiro, Brazil
- Height: 1.80 m (5 ft 11 in)
- Position: Centre back

Youth career
- Years: Team
- São Cristóvão
- Olaria

Managerial career
- 2005–2008: Flamengo (youth)
- 2009–2011: Audax Rio (youth)
- 2012–2016: Flamengo (youth)
- 2016–2017: Flamengo
- 2017–2018: Vasco da Gama
- 2018–2019: Botafogo
- 2019: Fortaleza
- 2019: Internacional
- 2021: Qatar SC
- 2022: Vasco da Gama
- 2022–2023: Shimizu S-Pulse
- 2023: Cruzeiro
- 2024: Goiás
- 2025: Criciúma
- 2026: Sporting Cristal

José Ricardo Mannarino (born 5 June 1971), known as Zé Ricardo, is a Brazilian professional football coach and former player.

== Career ==
=== Early career ===
Born in Rio de Janeiro, Zé Ricardo represented São Cristóvão and Olaria as a youth, but retired at early age. He subsequently appeared professionally in futsal, but retired at the age of 25.

In 1992, aged only 21, Zé Ricardo was appointed manager of futsal club Vila Isabel. He subsequently went on to manage Vasco da Gama and Botafogo in the 1990s, and also took charge of adult teams in Italy.

Zé Ricardo arrived at Flamengo in 1998, still in futsal. In 2005, he moved to football, being initially in charge of the youth categories.

In 2008 Zé Ricardo left Fla and was appointed manager of Audax Rio. He returned to the former in 2012, being crowned champions of multiple tournaments with the under-18s and under-20s.

=== Flamengo ===
On 26 May 2016, Zé Ricardo was appointed as caretaker of the first team, after Muricy Ramalho resigned due to health problems. His first professional match in charge occurred on 29 May 2016, a 2–1 Série A away win against Ponte Preta.

Zé Ricardo was appointed as permanent first team manager on 14 July 2016. On 6 August of the following year, he was sacked after winning only a single match in eight.

=== Vasco da Gama ===
On 22 August 2017, just two weeks after departing Flamengo, Zé Ricardo took charge of fellow state club, and biggest rival, Vasco da Gama. He took the club to a seventh position in the season, thus qualifying for the 2018 Copa Libertadores.

On 2 June of the following year, Zé Ricardo resigned.

=== Botafogo ===
On 4 August 2018, Zé Ricardo was appointed manager of Botafogo still in his native state, in the place of fired Marcos Paquetá. On 12 April 2019, after being knocked out of the year's Copa do Brasil by Série C side Juventude, he was sacked.

=== Fortaleza ===
On 12 August 2019, Zé Ricardo replaced Rogério Ceni at the helm of Fortaleza, still in the first division. On 27 September, however, he was relieved from his duties, with Ceni subsequently taking his place.

=== Internacional ===
On 21 October 2019, Zé Ricardo was announced as manager of Internacional until the end of the year.

=== Qatar SC ===
After leaving Internacional, Zé Ricardo spent a year in Italy studying, and was appointed manager of Qatar SC on 14 June 2021. On 29 September, after only five matches, he was sacked.

=== Vasco da Gama return ===
On 4 December 2021, Zé Ricardo returned to Vasco da Gama after being named manager of the club for the 2022 campaign. On 5 June 2022, he resigned.

=== Shimizu S-Pulse ===
Following the dismissal of Hiroaki Hiraoka in the middle of the 2022 J1 League season, Zé Ricardo was appointed manager of Shimizu S-Pulse. However, he was unable to help them survive in the top flight and they were relegated to the J2 League.

Shimizu also started the 2023 season very poorly, winning none of their first seven games, scoring only four goals in the process. On 3 April 2023, it was announced that Zé Ricardo's contract with the club had been mutually terminated.

=== Cruzeiro ===
On 5 September 2023, Zé Ricardo returned to his home country, after being announced at Cruzeiro in the top tier. He was dismissed on 12 November, with the club in the relegation zone.

=== Goiás ===
On 25 December 2023, Zé Ricardo was named head coach of Goiás for the upcoming season. He left on a mutual agreement on 25 March 2024, after being knocked out of the 2024 Copa Verde.

=== Criciúma ===
On 18 December 2024, Zé Ricardo was appointed Criciúma head coach. The following 6 May, he was sacked.

=== Sporting Cristal ===
On 3 April 2026, Zé Ricardo moved abroad and replaced compatriot Paulo Autuori at the helm of Sporting Cristal in Peru. On 5 June, he left by mutual consent.

== Managerial statistics ==
As of 25 March 2024

Managerial record by team and tenure
Team	Nat	From	To	Record								Ref
Team	Nat	From	To	G	W	D	L	GF	GA	GD	Win %	Ref
Flamengo	(Brazil)	26 May 2016	6 August 2017	89	48	25	16	147	84	+63	53.93	
Vasco da Gama	(Brazil)	22 August 2017	2 June 2018	50	22	13	15	70	65	+5	44.00	
Botafogo	(Brazil)	4 August 2018	12 April 2019	41	17	11	13	52	44	+8	41.46	
Fortaleza	(Brazil)	12 August 2019	27 September 2019	7	1	2	4	7	11	−4	14.29	
Internacional	(Brazil)	22 October 2019	8 December 2019	11	4	3	4	13	15	−2	36.36	
Qatar SC	(Qatar)	1 July 2021	29 September 2021	5	1	1	3	4	8	−4	20.00	
Vasco da Gama	(Brazil)	4 December 2021	5 June 2022	25	12	8	5	29	17	+12	48.00	
Shimizu S-Pulse	(Japan)	5 June 2022	3 April 2023	28	6	11	11	37	41	−4	21.43	
Cruzeiro	(Brazil)	5 September 2023	12 November 2023	10	3	2	5	9	8	+1	30.00	
Goiás	(Brazil)	25 December 2023	25 March 2024	16	9	6	1	22	6	+16	56.25	
Criciúma	(Brazil)	18 December 2024	6 May 2025	21	9	8	4	29	16	+13	42.86	
Sporting Cristal	(Peru)	3 April 2026	present	0	0	0	0	0	0	+0	—	
Total				304	133	90	81	419	314	+105	43.75	—

== Honours ==
=== As manager ===
Flamengo

- Copa São Paulo de Futebol Júnior: 2016
- Campeonato Carioca: 2017

Individual

- Campeonato Carioca Coach of the year: 2018
