= List of foreign Campeonato Brasileiro Série A players =

This is a list of foreign players that have played in the Campeonato Brasileiro Série A. The following players:

1. have played at least one Campeonato Brasileiro Série A game for the respective club.
2. are considered foreign, i.e., outside the Brazil determined by the following:

A player is considered foreign if his allegiance is not to play for the national teams of Brazil.

More specifically,

- If a player has been capped at an international level, the national team is used; if he has been capped by more than one country, the highest level (or the most recent) team is used. These include Brazilian players with dual citizenship.
- If a player has not been capped at the international level, his country of birth is used, except for those who were born abroad from Brazil parents or moved to the Brazil at a young age, and those who clearly indicated to have switched his nationality to another nation.

Players in bold have played at least one game for their national team.

== Africa (CAF) ==
=== Algeria ===
- **Billal Brahimi** – Santos (2025)
- **Islam Slimani** – Coritiba (2023)

=== Angola ===
- **Bastos** – Botafogo (2023–2026)
- **Domingos Andrade** – Botafogo (2026–)
- **Geraldo** – Coritiba (2011, 2013–2014)
- **Johnson Macaba** – Gama (2001), Goiás (2006)
- **Loide Augusto** – Vasco da Gama (2025)

=== Cameroon ===
- **Duplexe Tchamba** – Remo (2026–)
- **Joel Tagueu** – Coritiba (2014), Cruzeiro (2015, 2019), Santos (2016), Botafogo (2017), Avaí (2017)
- **William Andem** – Cruzeiro (1994–1996), Bahia (1997)

=== Cape Verde ===
- **Jovane Cabral** – Grêmio (2026–)

=== DR Congo (Democratic Republic of the Congo) ===
- **Yannick Bolasie** – Criciúma (2024), Cruzeiro (2025), Chapecoense (2026–)

=== Ghana ===
- Benjamin Arhin – Internacional (2026-)

=== Guinea ===
- **Mamady Cissé** – Atlético Mineiro (2026–)

=== Guinea-Bissau ===
- **João Pedro** – Remo (2026)

=== Ivory Coast ===
- **Salomon Kalou** – Botafogo (2020)

=== Morocco ===
- **Hakim Ziyech** – Botafogo (2026–)
- **Zakaria Labyad** – Corinthians (2026–)

=== Mozambique ===
- Nuno Robalo – Paysandu (1995)

=== Nigeria ===
- Abubakar Bello-Osagie – Vasco da Gama (2008)
- **Benji Nzeakor** – Vitória (1988,1991)
- **Ricky Owubokiri** – América-RJ (1984)
- Shola Ogundana – Flamengo (2024)

=== Sierra Leone ===
- **Aluspah Brewah** – Flamengo (2004), Fortaleza (2005)

=== South Africa ===
- **Mark Williams** – Corinthians (1996)
- Tyroane Sandows – Grêmio (2016–2017)

=== Togo ===
- **Hamílton** – Náutico (2008), Sport Recife (2009, 2012)

=== Tunisia ===
- **Ady** – Bahia (1994–1996), Santos (1998), Portuguesa (1999)

== Asia (AFC) ==
=== China ===
- **Alan** – Fluminense (2008–2010, 2022–2023)
- **Aloísio** – Grêmio (2006), Figueirense (2011–2012), São Paulo (2013), América Mineiro (2022–2023)
- **Elkeson** – Vitória (2009–2011), Botafogo (2011–2012)
- **Fernandinho** – Flamengo (2012-2013)
- **Serginho** – Santos (2014-2017), Vitória (2016), América Mineiro (2018)
- Chen Zhizhao – Corinthians (2012–2013)

=== Hong Kong ===
- **Itaparica** – Cruzeiro (2003)

=== India ===
- **Romeo Fernandes** – Athletico Paranaense (2015)

=== Indonesia ===
- **Beto Gonçalves** – Juventude (2007)

=== Japan ===
- **Kazu Miura** – Coritiba (1988–1989)
- **Keisuke Honda** – Botafogo (2020)
- **Masakiyo Maezono** – Santos (1998)
- Tomo Sugawara – Santos (1999)

=== Lebanon ===
- Adnan Abou Rizk – Corinthians (1968-1969), Olaria (1973)
- **Jadir Morgenstern** – Athletico Paranaense (1993–1994)

=== Malaysia ===
- **Bérgson** – Grêmio (2009–2010), Portuguesa (2013), Chapecoense (2014), Athletico Paranaense (2018), Ceará (2019–2020), Fortaleza (2020)

=== Qatar ===
- **Emerson Sheik** – São Paulo (1998–1999), Flamengo (2009, 2015–2016), Fluminense (2010–2011), Corinthians (2011–2014, 2018), Botafogo (2014), Ponte Preta (2017)
- **Guilherme Torres** – Portuguesa (2012), Corinthians (2012—2014)
- **Lucas Mendes** – Coritiba (2008, 2011-2012)
- **Marcone** – Vitória (1997, 2000)
- **Rodrigo Tabata** – Goiás (2004-2005), Santos (2006-2008)

=== Timor-Leste ===
- **Juninho** – Avaí (2015)
- **Patrick Fabiano** – CSA (2019)
- **Rodrigo Silva** – Atlético Mineiro (2005)

=== United Arab Emirates ===
- **Caio Canedo** – Botafogo (2010-2011), Figueirense (2012), Internacional (2013), Vitória (2014)
- **Erik** – Internacional (2019)
- **Fábio Lima** – Vasco da Gama (2013)
- **Luan Pereira** – Avaí (2017, 2019)
- **Yuri César** – Fortaleza (2020)

=== Vietnam ===
- **Rafaelson Bezerra** – Vitória (2016-2017)

== Europe (UEFA) ==
=== Armenia ===
- **Alex** – Botafogo-SP (2001)

=== Azerbaijan ===
- **Andrezinho** – Fluminense (1997), Vasco da Gama (2001)
- **Ernani Pereira** – Guarani (2001)

=== Belgium ===
- Francis Amuzu – Grêmio (2025–)

=== Bosnia and Herzegovina ===
- **Sanjin Pintul** – Athletico Paranaense (1997)

=== Bulgaria ===
- **Cicinho** – Ponte Preta (2012–2013), Santos (2013–2015), Bahia (2023–2024)
- **Lúcio Wagner** – Botafogo (1998)
- **Tiago Silva** – Palmeiras (1998-2000), Portuguesa (2001)
- **Wanderson** – Portuguesa (2013)

=== Croatia ===
- **Eduardo da Silva** – Flamengo (2014–2015), Athletico Paranaense (2017–2018)
- Filip Krovinović – Grêmio (2026–)

=== Cyprus ===
- **Fabiano Freitas** – São Paulo (2007)

=== Denmark ===
- **Martin Braithwaite** – Grêmio (2024–)

=== England ===
- **Jesse Lingard** – Corinthians (2026–)

=== France ===
- Danlaba Mendy – Grêmio (1998)
- **Dimitri Payet** – Vasco da Gama (2023–2025)

=== Germany ===
- Alexander Baumjohann – Coritiba (2017), Vitória (2018)
- Alexander Kamianecky – America-RJ (1971–1979), América-RN (1980), Nacional-AM (1981)
- Mihajlo Schingirly – América Mineiro (1971-1974), Goiânia (1975)
- **Paulo Rink** – Athletico Paranaense (1990, 1992, 1993–1994, 1995–1997), Atlético Mineiro (1991), Santos (1999)
- Viktor Walter – Cruzeiro (1967-1968)

=== Greece ===
- **Andreas Samaris** – Coritiba (2023)

=== Hungary ===
- **Leandro de Almeida** – Athletico Paranaense (2005)

=== Italy ===
- André Anderson – São Paulo (2022)
- Benito Fantoni – Atlético Mineiro (1959), Cruzeiro (1961)
- Carlucci – Atlético Goianiense (1965)
- **Cristian Ledesma** – Santos (2015)
- **Éder** – Criciúma (2004, 2024), São Paulo (2021–2022)
- **Emerson Palmieri** – Santos (2011–2015)
- **João Pedro** – Atlético Mineiro (2010), Santos (2012), Grêmio (2023–2024)
- **Jorginho** – Flamengo (2025–)
- Marco Osio – Palmeiras (1996)
- Miro Sergi – Bahia (1963)
- **Rafael Tolói** – Goiás (2009-2010), São Paulo (2012-2015, 2025–)
- Rodrigo Possebon – Santos (2010–2011)
- **Rômulo** – Santo André (2009), Cruzeiro (2010), Athletico Paranaense (2011)

=== Montenegro ===
- Željko Tadić – Vasco da Gama (2004)

=== Netherlands ===
- **Clarence Seedorf** – Botafogo (2012–2014)
- **Memphis Depay** – Corinthians (2024–)

=== Northern Ireland ===
- **Jamal Lewis** – São Paulo (2024)

=== Poland ===
- **Krzysztof Nowak** – Athletico Paranaense (1996–1998)
- **Mariusz Piekarski** – Athletico Paranaense (1996–1997), Flamengo (1997)
- **Roger Guerreiro** – São Caetano (2001–2002), Corinthians (2003), Flamengo (2004), Juventude (2005)

=== Portugal ===
- Arouca – Palmeiras (1974-1976), Portuguesa (1977-1978), Ferroviária (1983)
- Aurélio Buta – São Paulo FC (2026–)
- Bruno Pereirinha – Athletico Paranaense (2015–2017)
- **Cédric Soares** – São Paulo (2025–)
- **Deco** – Corinthians (1996), Fluminense (2010–2013)
- **Domingos Duarte** – São Paulo (2026–)
- Fábio Braga – Fluminense (2012-2013), Coritiba (2016), Ponte Preta (2017)
- Fernandes – São Paulo (1967)
- **Fernando Peres** – Vasco da Gama (1974), Sport Recife (1975), Treze (1976)
- **Gonçalo Paciência** – Sport Recife (2025)
- **Ivan Cavaleiro** – Red Bull Bragantino (2024)
- **Jacinto João** – Portuguesa (1975)
- João Costa – Cruzeiro (2026–)
- João Silva – Sport Recife (2025)
- José Dominguez – Vasco da Gama (2005)
- **Josué Pesqueira** – Coritiba (2026–)
- **Liédson** – Coritiba (2001), Flamengo (2002, 2012), Corinthians (2003, 2011–2012)
- **Lito** – Vasco da Gama (1979)
- Marcos Paulo – Fluminense (2019–2021), São Paulo (2023)
- Nuno Moreira – Vasco da Gama (2025–)
- **Otávio** – Internacional (2012-2014)
- Rafael Ramos – Corinthians (2022), Ceará (2025)
- Raphael Guzzo – Goiás (2023)
- Rúben Ismael – Vitória (2025–)
- Rúben Rodrigues – Vitória (2025)
- **Sérgio Oliveira** – Sport Recife (2025)
- Tobias Figueiredo – Fortaleza (2023), Criciúma (2024)

=== Russia ===
- **Ari** – Fortaleza (2005)
- **Guilherme Marinato** – Athletico Paranaense (2005–2007)
- **Mário Fernandes** – Grêmio (2009-2011)

=== Serbia ===
- Dejan Osmanović – Vitória (2001)
- **Dejan Petković** – Vitória (1997–1999), Flamengo (2000–2002, 2009–2011), Vasco da Gama (2002–2003, 2004), Fluminense (2005–2006), Goiás (2006), Santos (2007), Atlético Mineiro (2008)
- Miodrag Anđelković – Fluminense (2001)
- Nikola Damjanac – Fluminense (2001)
- Vladimir Đorđević – Fluminense (2006)
- Vladimir Petković – Botafogo (2001)

=== Spain ===
- Aitor Cantalapiedra – Vitória (2025–2026)
- **Catanha** – Paysandu (1995), Atlético Mineiro (2005)
- Chris Ramos – Botafogo (2025–2026)
- **Donato** – América-RJ (1983-1984), Vasco da Gama (1985-1987)
- **Diego Costa** – Atlético Mineiro (2021), Botafogo (2023), Grêmio (2024)
- Fran Mérida – Athletico Paranaense (2013–2014)
- Héctor Hernández – Corinthians (2024–2025)
- Hugo Mallo – Internacional (2023–2024)
- Jesé – Coritiba (2023)
- **Juanfran** – São Paulo (2019–2021)
- Marco Moreno – Bahia (2026–)
- **Marcos Senna** – Corinthians (1999–2000), Juventude (2001), São Caetano (2002)
- Miguel Carvalho – Chapecoense (2026–)
- Pablo Marí – Flamengo (2019)
- **Saúl** – Flamengo (2025–)

=== Sweden ===
- **Niclas Eliasson** – Internacional (2026–)

=== Switzerland ===
- Maxime Dominguez – Vasco da Gama (2024)

=== Turkey ===
- **Colin Kazim-Richards** – Coritiba (2016), Corinthians (2017–2018)

=== Ukraine ===
- **Júnior Moraes** – Santos (2007–2008), Santo André (2009), Corinthians (2022–2023)
- **Marlos** – Coritiba (2008–2009), São Paulo (2009–2011), Athletico Paranaense (2022)

== North and Central America, Caribbean (CONCACAF) ==
=== Canada ===
- **Tony Menezes** – Botafogo-SP (2001)

=== Costa Rica ===
- **Bryan Ruiz** – Santos (2018–2020)
- **Joel Campbell** – Atlético Goianiense (2024)
- **Rodney Wallace** – Sport Recife (2016)

=== Jamaica ===
- **Allan Cole** – Náutico (1972)

=== Mexico ===
- **Antonio de Nigris** – Santos (2006)
- **Leandro Augusto** – Criciúma (1996–1998), Internacional (1998), Botafogo (1999–2000)

=== Nicaragua ===
- **Jacob Montes** – Botafogo (2022, 2024)

=== Panama ===
- **Felipe Baloy** – Grêmio (2003–2004), Athletico Paranaense (2005)
- **Kadir Barría** – Botafogo (2025–)

=== Suriname ===
- François Thijm – Remo (1965)

=== United States ===
- **Desmond Armstrong** – Santos (1991)
- **Freddy Adu** – Bahia (2013)
- **Johnny Cardoso** – Internacional (2019–2023)

== South America (CONMEBOL) ==
=== Argentina ===
- Adonis Frías – Santos (2025–2026)
- Adrián González – São Paulo (2009)
- Adrián Martínez – Coritiba (2022)
- Agustín Allione – Palmeiras (2014–2016), Bahia (2017–2018)
- **Agustín Cejas** – Santos (1970-1971, 1973-1974), Grêmio (1976)
- Agustín Doffo – Chapecoense (2018)
- **Agustín Giay** – Palmeiras (2024–)
- **Agustín Marchesín** – Grêmio (2024)
- Agustín Rossi – Flamengo (2023–)
- **Alan Franco** – São Paulo (2023–2026)
- Alan Lescano – Vasco da Gama (2026–)
- Alan Ruiz – Grêmio (2014)
- Alejandro Donatti – Flamengo (2016–2017)
- **Alejandro Mancuso** – Palmeiras (1995), Flamengo (1996–1997)
- Alejandro Martínez – Ceará (2025)
- Alejandro Martinuccio – Fluminense (2011, 2015), Cruzeiro (2012–2013), Chapecoense (2016–2017)
- **Alejandro Sabella** – Grêmio (1985)
- Alejo Véliz – Bahia (2026–)
- Alexander Barboza – Botafogo (2024–2026), Palmeiras (2026–)
- Alexandro Bernabei – Internacional (2024–)
- Alexis Ferrero – Botafogo (2008)
- Alexis Messidoro – Cruzeiro (2017)
- Alfredo Obberti – Grêmio (1972-1973)
- Álvaro Barreal – Cruzeiro (2024), Santos (2025–)
- Álvaro Montoro – Botafogo (2025–)
- Andrés Chávez – São Paulo (2016-2017)
- **Andrés D'Alessandro** – Internacional (2008–2015, 2017–2020)
- Andrés Ríos – Vasco da Gama (2017-2018)
- Andrés Romero – Náutico (2012)
- **Aníbal Moreno** – Palmeiras (2024–2025)
- **Ariel Cabral** – Cruzeiro (2015–2019), Goiás (2020)
- Ariel Nahuelpán – Coritiba (2008–2010), Internacional (2016–2017)
- Benjamín Garré – Vasco da Gama (2025)
- Benjamín Rollheiser – Santos (2025–)
- Braian Aguirre – Internacional (2024–)
- Braian Cufré – Remo (2026)
- Braian Romero – Athletico Paranaense (2019), Internacional (2022)
- Brian Sarmiento – Ponte Preta (2013)
- Bruno Zapelli – Athletico Paranaense (2023–2024, 2026–)
- Carlos Alcaraz – Flamengo (2024)
- Carlos Buttice – America-RJ (1971–1972), Bahia (1972–1974)
- Carlos Frontini – Vitória (2002), Ponte Preta (2005), Santos (2005), América de Natal (2007), Figueirense (2007), Goiás (2008)
- Carlos Galván – Atlético Mineiro (1998–2000), Santos (2000–2002), Paysandu (2004)
- Carlos Luque – Internacional (2014-2015)
- **Carlos Tevez** – Corinthians (2005–2006)
- Chamaco Rodríguez – Grêmio (1971)
- Christian Ortiz – Sport Recife (2025)
- Claudio Aquino – Fluminense (2016)
- **Claudio Borghi** – Flamengo (1989)
- Claudio Spinelli – Vasco da Gama (2026–)
- **Clemente Rodríguez** – São Paulo (2013)
- Cristian Medina – Botafogo (2026–)
- **Cristian Pavón** – Atlético Mineiro (2022–2023), Grêmio (2024–)
- Damián Escudero – Grêmio (2011), Atlético Mineiro (2012), Vitória (2013–2014), Vasco da Gama (2017–2018)
- Damián Musto – Internacional (2020)
- Darío Bottinelli – Flamengo (2011–2012), Coritiba (2013)
- Darío Conca – Vasco da Gama (2007), Fluminense (2008–2011, 2014), Flamengo (2017)
- Diego Capria – Atlético Mineiro (2000)
- Diego Churín – Grêmio (2020–2021), Atlético Goianiense (2022)
- Diego Loscri – Guarani (2004)
- **Diego Morales** – Náutico (2013)
- Diego Tarzia – Vitória (2026–)
- Diego Torres – Chapecoense (2018–2019)
- Eduardo Dreyer – Coritiba (1972–1975), Londrina (1976, 1977), Athletico Paranaense (1978)
- Eduardo Navarro – Bahia (1976)
- Emanuel Biancucchi – Bahia (2014), Vasco da Gama (2015)
- Emanuel Brítez – Fortaleza (2022–2025), Vitória (2026–)
- Emiliano Dudar – Vasco da Gama (2006-2007)
- **Emiliano Rigoni** – São Paulo (2021–2022, 2025)
- Emiliano Vecchio – Santos (2016–2018)
- Emmanuel Martínez – América Mineiro (2022–2023), Fortaleza (2024–2025), Vitória (2026–)
- Enzo Díaz – São Paulo (2025–)
- **Ernesto Farías** – Cruzeiro (2010-2011)
- Eros Mancuso – Fortaleza (2024–2025)
- Esteban Burgos – América Mineiro (2023)
- Eugenio Isnaldo – Bahia (2021)
- Ezequiel Cerutti – Coritiba (2020)
- Ezequiel González – Fluminense (2009-2010)
- Ezequiel Miralles – Grêmio (2011–2012), Santos (2012)
- Fabián Monzón – Fluminense (2013)
- Fabián Noguera – Santos (2016–2017)
- Fábio de los Santos – Criciúma (1995), Bragantino (1997), Botafogo-SP (1999), Grêmio (2001–2002)
- **Fabricio Bustos** – Internacional (2022–2024), Coritiba (2026–)
- Fabrizio Angileri – Corinthians (2025–)
- Facundo Bertoglio – Grêmio (2012)
- Facundo Colidio – Vasco da Gama (2026–)
- Fausto Vera – Corinthians (2022–2024), Atlético Mineiro (2024–2025)
- **Federico Mancuello** – Flamengo (2016–2017), Cruzeiro (2018)
- Federico Nieto – Athletico Paranaense (2010–2012)
- Fernando Ávalos – Corinthians (2000–2001)
- Fernando Barrientos – Athletico Paranaense (2015–2016)
- **Fernando Cavenaghi** – Internacional (2011)
- Fernando Tobio – Palmeiras (2014-2015)
- Franco Cristaldo – Grêmio (2023–2025)
- **Franco Di Santo** – Atlético Mineiro (2019–2020)
- Gabriel Amato – Grêmio (2000)
- Gabriel Carabajal – Santos (2022), Vasco da Gama (2023)
- **Gabriel Mercado** – Internacional (2021–)
- **Gabriel Rojas** – Cruzeiro (2026–)
- Gastón Ávila – Fortaleza (2025)
- Gastón Benavídez – Athletico Paranaense (2026–)
- Gastón Fernández – Grêmio (2017)
- Germán Cano – Vasco da Gama (2020), Fluminense (2022–)
- Germán Conti – Bahia (2021), América Mineiro (2022)
- Germán Herrera – Grêmio (2006–2007, 2009–2010), Corinthians (2008), Botafogo (2010–2012)
- Gervasio Núñez – Botafogo (2016–2017)
- Giuliano Galoppo – São Paulo (2022–2024)
- Gonzalo Escobar – Fortaleza (2023), Santos (2025–)
- **Héctor Canteros** – Flamengo (2014–2016), Chapecoense (2017–2018)
- **Héctor Veira** – Corinthians (1976)
- **Hernán Barcos** – Palmeiras (2012), Grêmio (2013-2014), Cruzeiro (2018)
- Horacio Ameli – São Paulo (2002)
- Hugo Colace – Flamengo (2008)
- **Ignacio Canuto** – Figueirense (2012)
- **Ignacio Fernández** – Atlético Mineiro (2021–2022)
- **Ignacio Scocco** – Internacional (2013)
- Imanol Machuca – Fortaleza (2023–2024)
- **Javier Mascherano** – Corinthians (2005–2006)
- Javier Toledo – Athletico Paranaense (2010)
- **Jesús Dátolo** – Internacional (2012–2013), Atlético Mineiro (2013–2016)
- **Joaquín Correa** – Botafogo (2025–2026)
- **Joaquín Freitas** – Flamengo (2026–)
- Joel Carli – Botafogo (2016–2019, 2022)
- Jonatan Cristaldo – Palmeiras (2014–2016)
- Jonathan Calleri – São Paulo (2016, 2021–)
- Jonathan Gómez – São Paulo (2017–2018), CSA (2019), Sport Recife (2020)
- Jorge Paolino – Flamengo (1976–1977)
- José Herrera – Fortaleza (2025), Red Bull Bragantino (2026–)
- **José Manuel López** – Palmeiras (2022–)
- **José Sanfilippo** – Bahia (1968-1970)
- Juan Arraya – Portuguesa (2013)
- Juan Dinenno – Cruzeiro (2024–2025), São Paulo (2025)
- Juan Ferreyra – Botafogo (2014)
- Juan Herbella – Internacional (2004)
- **Juan Manuel Martínez** – Corinthians (2012)
- Juan Martín Lucero – Fortaleza (2023–2025)
- Juan Nardoni – Grêmio (2026–)
- Juan Pablo Freytes – Fluminense (2025–)
- **Juan Pablo Sorín** – Cruzeiro (2000-2001, 2004, 2009)
- Juan Sánchez Miño – Cruzeiro (2016)
- Juan Sforza – Vasco da Gama (2024–2025), Juventude (2025)
- Julián Maidana – Grêmio (2006)
- Julián Palacios – Goiás (2023)
- Julio Buffarini – São Paulo (2016–2017)
- Julio Furch – Santos (2023)
- Keko Villalva – Goiás (2020)
- Kevin Lomónaco – Red Bull Bragantino (2022)
- Lautaro Díaz – Cruzeiro (2024–2025), Santos (2025–2026)
- Leandro Chaparro – Vasco da Gama (2011-2012)
- Leandro Desábato – Vasco da Gama (2018)
- Leandro Fernández – Internacional (2020)
- Leandro Zárate – Botafogo (2008)
- **Leonardo Astrada** – Grêmio (2000)
- Leonardo Gil – Vasco da Gama (2020)
- Leonardo Godoy – Athletico Paranaense (2024), Santos (2025)
- Leonardo Pisculichi – Vitória (2017)
- Leonel Di Plácido – Botafogo (2023)
- Leonel Pérez – Grêmio (2026)
- Leonel Picco – Remo (2026–)
- **Leopoldo Luque** – Santos (1983)
- **Lisandro López** – Internacional (2015)
- Livio Prieto – Atlético Mineiro (2005)
- Luca Orellano – Vasco da Gama (2023)
- **Lucas Alario** – Internacional (2024)
- Lucas Besozzi – Grêmio (2023)
- Lucas Di Yorio – Athletico Paranaense (2024)
- Lucas Esquivel – Athletico Paranaense (2023–2024, 2026–)
- Lucas Mugni – Flamengo (2014–2015), Sport Recife (2020), Bahia (2021, 2023), Ceará (2025)
- **Lucas Pratto** – Atlético Mineiro (2015–2016), São Paulo (2017)
- Lucas Romero – Cruzeiro (2016–2019, 2024–)
- Lucas Villalba – Cruzeiro (2024–)
- **Lucho González** – Athletico Paranaense (2016–2021)
- Luciano Acosta – Fluminense (2025–)
- Luciano Giménez – Cuiabá (2024)
- **Luis Artime** – Palmeiras (1968), Fluminense (1972)
- Manuel Capasso – Vasco da Gama (2023)
- **Manuel Lanzini** – Fluminense (2011–2012)
- Marcelino Moreno – Coritiba (2023)
- Marcelo Benítez – Vitória (2018)
- Marcelo Cañete – São Paulo (2011), Portuguesa (2013)
- Marcelo Meli – Vitória (2018)
- **Marco Ruben** – Athletico Paranaense (2019)
- Mariano Torres – Náutico (2009)
- Mariano Trípodi – Santos (2008), Vitória (2008), Atlético Mineiro (2009), Joinville (2015)
- Mariano Vázquez – Fortaleza (2019–2021)
- **Mario Bolatti** – Internacional (2011–2012), Botafogo (2014)
- Martín Benítez – Vasco da Gama (2020), São Paulo (2021), América Mineiro (2022–2023)
- Martín Sarrafiore – Internacional (2018–2019), Coritiba (2020)
- Mateo Sanabria – Bahia (2025–)
- **Matías Defederico** – Corinthians (2009–2010)
- Matías Pisano – Cruzeiro (2016), Santa Cruz (2016)
- Matías Rodríguez – Grêmio (2014-2015)
- **Matías Zaracho** – Atlético Mineiro (2020–2024)
- **Mauro Boselli** – Corinthians (2019–2020)
- Maxi Biancucchi – Flamengo (2007–2009), Vitória (2013), Bahia (2014)
- Maxi López – Grêmio (2009), Vasco da Gama (2018–2019)
- Maxi Rolón – Santos (2016)
- Miguel Ángel Ortíz – Atlético Mineiro (1976–1977), Comercial-SP (1978), Caxias (1979)
- Nahuel Bustos – São Paulo (2022)
- **Narciso Doval** – Flamengo (1969–1970, 1972–1975), Fluminense (1976–1978)
- Néstor Scotta – Grêmio (1971)
- **Nicolás Otamendi** – Atlético Mineiro (2014)
- **Norberto Andrada** – Vasco da Gama (1969, 1971–1975), Vitória (1976)
- **Norberto Madurga** – Sociedade Esportiva Palmeiras (1972)
- **Oscar Ortiz** – Grêmio (1976)
- **Pablo Guiñazú** – Internacional (2007–2012), Vasco da Gama (2013, 2015)
- **Pablo Mouche** – Sociedade Esportiva Palmeiras (2014–2015)
- Pablo Vegetti – Vasco da Gama (2023–2025)
- Patito Rodríguez – Santos (2012–2013, 2014)
- Pol Fernández – Fortaleza (2025)
- Rafael Monti – Remo (2026–)
- Ramón Ábila – Cruzeiro (2016–2017)
- **Ramos Delgado** – Santos (1968–1971)
- Raúl Estévez – Botafogo (2004)
- Raúl Iberbia – Coritiba (2013–2014)
- **Raúl Páez** – Bahia (1969–1970)
- **Renzo Saravia** – Internacional (2020–2021), Botafogo (2022), Atlético Mineiro (2023–2025)
- **Ricardo Centurión** – São Paulo (2015–2016)
- Ricardo Romera – Santos (1977-1978)
- **Roberto Abbondanzieri** – Internacional (2010)
- **Rodolfo Fischer** – Botafogo (1972–1976), Vitória (1976)
- Rodrigo Atencio – Sport Recife (2025)
- **Rodrigo Battaglia** – Atlético Mineiro (2023–2024)
- Rodrigo Castillo – Fluminense (2026–)
- Rodrigo Díaz – Athletico Paranaense (2009)
- Rodrigo Garro – Corinthians (2024–)
- Rodrigo Villagra – Internacional (2026–)
- **Rogelio Domínguez** – Flamengo (1968)
- **Rolando Schiavi** – Grêmio (2007)
- Román Gómez – Bahia (2026–)
- Rubén Piaggio – Internacional (1994)
- Rubens Sambueza – Flamengo (2008)
- Santiago Longo – São Paulo (2024)
- Santiago Ramos Mingo – Bahia (2025–)
- Santiago Sosa – Vasco da Gama (2026–)
- **Sebastián Domínguez** – Corinthians (2005–2006)
- **Sebastián Saja** – Grêmio (2007–2008)
- Sergio Escudero – Corinthians (2009–2010), Coritiba (2012–2013), Criciúma (2014)
- Sergio Gioino – Palmeiras (2005)
- **Sergio Goycochea** – Internacional (1995)
- Silvio Romero – Fortaleza (2022–2023)
- **Thiago Almada** – Botafogo (2024)
- Tomás Andrade – Atlético Mineiro (2018), Athletico Paranaense (2019)
- Tomás Cardona – Fortaleza (2024)
- Tomás Cuello – Red Bull Bragantino (2020–2021), Athletico Paranaense (2022–2024), Atlético Mineiro (2025–)
- Tomás Pérez – Atlético Mineiro (2026–)
- Tomás Pochettino – Fortaleza (2023–2025), Vitória (2026–)
- **Ubaldo Fillol** – Flamengo (1984–1985)
- Valentín Depietri – Fortaleza (2021–2022)
- **Víctor Cuesta** – Internacional (2017–2021), Botafogo (2022–2023), Bahia (2024)
- Walter Bou – Vitória (2018)
- **Walter Kannemann** – Grêmio (2016–2021, 2023–)
- **Walter Montillo** – Cruzeiro (2010–2012), Santos (2013), Botafogo (2017)
- Walter Montoya – Grêmio (2019)

=== Bolivia ===
- **Carlos Aragonés** – Palmeiras (1981–1984), Coritiba (1984–1985)
- **Edivaldo Rojas** – Athletico Paranaense (2004, 2008), Figueirense (2005)
- **Henry Vaca** – Atlético Goianiense (2020)
- **José Alfredo Castillo** – Atlético Mineiro (2008)
- **Juan Carlos Arce** – Corinthians (2007), Sport Recife (2009)
- **Luis Alberto Gutiérrez** – Bahia (2012)
- **Luis Alí** – Ponte Preta (2017–2018)
- **Marcelo Moreno** – Cruzeiro (2007–2008, 2014), Grêmio (2012), Flamengo (2013)
- **Mauricio Ramos** – Cruzeiro (1994)
- **Miguel Terceros** – Santos (2022–2023, 2026–)
- **Pablo Escobar** – Ipatinga (2008), Santo André (2009)
- **Rodrigo Ramallo** – Vitória (2016-2017)

=== Chile ===
- Adán Vergara – Vasco da Gama (2005)
- Alejandro Escalona – Grêmio (2006)
- **Alexander Aravena** – Grêmio (2024–2025)
- **Ángelo Araos** – Corinthians (2018, 2020–2021)
- **Ángelo Henríquez** – Fortaleza (2021–2022)
- **Arturo Vidal** – Flamengo (2022–2023), Athletico Paranaense (2023)
- **Benjamín Kuscevic** – Palmeiras (2020–2022), Coritiba (2023), Fortaleza (2024–2025)
- **Carlos Palacios** – Internacional (2021)
- **César Pinares** – Grêmio (2020–2021)
- **Charles Aránguiz** – Internacional (2014–2015, 2023–2024)
- **Christian Vilches** – Athletico Paranaense (2015–2016)
- **Claudio Maldonado** – São Paulo (2000–2003), Cruzeiro (2003–2005), Santos (2006–2007), Flamengo (2009–2012), Corinthians (2013)
- Cristián Suárez – Corinthians (2008)
- Eduardo de la Barra – Avaí (1976)
- **Eduardo Vargas** – Grêmio (2013), Atlético Mineiro (2020–2024)
- **Elías Figueroa** – Internacional (1972–1976)
- **Erick Pulgar** – Flamengo (2022–)
- **Eros Pérez** – Internacional (2001)
- **Esteban Pavez** – Athletico Paranaense (2017–2018)
- **Eugenio Mena** – Santos (2013–2014), Cruzeiro (2015), São Paulo (2016), Sport Recife (2017), Bahia (2018)
- **Felipe Seymour** – Cruzeiro (2015), Vasco da Gama (2015)
- **Fernando Astengo** – Grêmio (1987)
- Francisco Arancibia – Palmeiras (2015–2016)
- **Gabriel Mendoza** – São Paulo (1997)
- **Gary Medel** – Vasco da Gama (2023–2024)
- **Gonzalo Fierro** – Flamengo (2008–2011)
- **Gonzalo Tapia** – São Paulo (2025–2026)
- **Guillermo Maripán** – Internacional (2026–)
- **Gustavo Canales** – Botafogo (2016–2017)
- **Héctor Tapia** – Cruzeiro (2004)
- Ignacio Jara – Goiás (2020)
- **Iván Román** – Atlético Mineiro (2025–2026)
- **Jean Meneses** – Vasco da Gama (2024–2025)
- **Jean Paul Pineda** – Vitória (2017)
- **Johnny Herrera** – Corinthians (2006)
- **Jorge Aravena** – Portuguesa (1991)
- **Jorge Valdivia** – Palmeiras (2006–2008, 2010–2012, 2014–2015)
- **José Luis Álvarez** – Fluminense (1984)
- **José Luis Sierra** – São Paulo (1994–1995)
- **José Luis Villanueva** – Vasco da Gama (2008)
- **Juan Carlos Letelier** – Internacional (1990)
- **Leonardo Valencia** – Botafogo (2017–2019)
- **Luciano Arriagada** – Athletico Paranaense (2023)
- **Luciano Cabral** – Athletico Paranaense (2016)
- **Luis Pedro Figueroa** – Palmeiras (2009–2010)
- **Marcos González** – Flamengo (2012–2014)
- **Mario Soto** – Palmeiras (1977)
- **Mark González** – Sport Recife (2016)
- **Mauricio Isla** – Flamengo (2020–2022)
- **Mauricio Pinilla** – Vasco da Gama (2008)
- **Nelson Tapia** – Santos (2004)
- **Nicolás Castillo** – Juventude (2021)
- **Pablo Galdames** – Vasco da Gama (2024)
- **Paulo Magalhães** – Internacional (2016)
- **Roberto Cereceda** – Figueirense (2014–2015)
- **Roberto Rojas** – São Paulo (1988–1989)

=== Colombia ===
- **Albeiro Usuriaga** – Santos (1996)
- **Álex Escobar** – Atlético Mineiro (1996)
- **Alexander Viveros** – Cruzeiro (2000, 2002)
- **Alfredo Morelos** – Santos (2023)
- Anderson Plata – Athletico Paranaense (2018–2019)
- **Andrés Colorado** – São Paulo (2022)
- Andrés Escobar – Vasco da Gama (2017)
- **Andrés Gómez** – Vasco da Gama (2025–)
- Andrés González - Remo (2026-)
- **Andrés Orozco** – Internacional (2007-2008)
- Brahian Palacios – Atlético Mineiro (2024–2025)
- Brayan Ceballos – Fortaleza (2022–2023)
- Brayan Lucumí – Coritiba (2020)
- **Carlos Cuesta** – Vasco da Gama (2025–)
- Carlos Terán – Athletico Paranaense (2026–)
- César Haydar – Red Bull Bragantino (2020–2021)
- Christian Rivera – Sport Recife (2025)
- Cristian Borja – Internacional (2007), Flamengo (2010)
- **Daniel Giraldo** – Juventude (2025)
- Daniel Hernández – Athletico Paranaense (2015)
- **Daniel Ruiz** – Santos (2023)
- **Darío Muñoz** – Palmeiras (2001–2006), Goiás (2006)
- **David Ferreira** – Athletico Paranaense (2005–2010)
- **Dayro Moreno** – Athletico Paranaense (2006)
- **Diego Arias** – Cruzeiro (2012)
- **Dorlan Pabón** – São Paulo (2014)
- Duvier Riascos – Cruzeiro (2015-2016), Vasco da Gama (2015,2018)
- Dylan Borrero – Atlético Mineiro (2020–2021), Chapecoense (2026–)
- **Edixon Perea** – Grêmio (2008-2009)
- **Eduard Atuesta** – Palmeiras (2022–2023)
- **Edwin Valencia** – Athletico Paranaense (2017–2010), Fluminense (2010–2014), Santos (2015–2016)
- Eisner Loboa – América Mineiro (2016)
- Emerson Batalla – Juventude (2025)
- Emerson Rodríguez – Vasco da Gama (2024)
- **Fabián Vargas** – Internacional (2006-2007)
- **Faustino Asprilla** – Palmeiras (1999–2000), Fluminense (2000)
- **Felipe Aguilar** – Santos (2019–2020), Athletico Paranaense (2020)
- **Fernando Uribe** – Flamengo (2018–2019), Santos (2019–2020)
- **Freddy Rincón** – Palmeiras (1993–1995), Corinthians (1997–2000, 2004), Santos (2000), Cruzeiro (2001)
- **Fredy Guarín** – Vasco da Gama (2019)
- Gabriel Fuentes – Fluminense (2024–2025)
- **Gustavo Cuéllar** – Flamengo (2016–2019), Grêmio (2025)
- Gustavo del Toro – Atlético Mineiro (2000)
- Gustavo Torres – Vasco da Gama (2020)
- **Héctor Hurtado** – Internacional (1999)
- **Helibelton Palacios** – Cruzeiro (2023–2024)
- **Henry Mosquera** – Red Bull Bragantino (2023–)
- **Hugo Rodallega** – Bahia (2021)
- Iván Angulo – Botafogo (2020)
- Jaime Alvarado – Athletico Paranaense (2020)
- **James Rodríguez** – São Paulo (2023–2024)
- **Jaminton Campaz** – Grêmio (2021)
- Jan Lucumí – Fluminense (2024)
- Javier Reina – Ceará (2010, 2018)
- Jhoan Hernández – Botafogo (2026–)
- **Jhon Arias** – Fluminense (2021–2025), Palmeiras (2026–)
- Jhon Vásquez – Ceará (2022)
- **Johan Carbonero** – Internacional (2025–)
- Johan Rojas – Vasco da Gama (2026–)
- **Jonathan Copete** – Santos (2016–2019), Avaí (2022)
- **Jonathan Estrada** – Avaí (2011)
- Jonny Mosquera – Avaí (2019)
- Jordan Barrera – Botafogo (2025–)
- **Jorge Carrascal** – Flamengo (2025–)
- Jorge Rivaldo – Athletico Paranaense (2026–)
- José Enamorado – Grêmio (2026–)
- Jown Cardona – Ceará (2018–2019)
- Juan Angulo – Bahia (2013)
- Juan Carlos Díaz – Coritiba (2022)
- **Juan Carlos Henao** – Santos (2005)
- Juan Felipe Aguirre – Athletico Paranaense (2026–)
- Juan Manuel Cuesta – Internacional (2021)
- Juan Pablo Ramírez – Bahia (2021), América Mineiro (2022)
- **Juan Portilla** – Athletico Paranaense (2026–)
- Juan Quintero – Fortaleza (2019–2020), Juventude (2021)
- Julián Millán – Fluminense (2026–)
- **Julián Viáfara** – Athletico Paranaense (2006–2008), Vitória (2008–2011)
- Kelvin Osorio – Cuiabá (2022)
- Kerwin Vargas – Athletico Paranaense (2026–)
- **Kevin Castaño** – Atlético Mineiro (2026–)
- **Kevin Serna** – Fluminense (2024–)
- **Kevin Viveros** – Athletico Paranaense (2026–)
- Luis Carlos Ruiz – Sport Recife (2016)
- **Luis Orejuela** – Cruzeiro (2019), Grêmio (2020), São Paulo (2021), Athletico Paranaense (2022)
- **Luis Sinisterra** – Cruzeiro (2025–)
- **Marino Hinestroza** – Vasco da Gama (2026–)
- **Marlos Moreno** – Flamengo (2018)
- Martín García – São Caetano (2006), Vasco da Gama (2007)
- **Mateo Cassierra** – Atlético Mineiro (2026–)
- Mateo Zuleta – Atlético Goianiense (2024)
- **Mauricio Molina** – Santos (2008–2009)
- Michael Ortega – Figueirense (2016)
- **Miguel Borja** – Palmeiras (2017–2019), Grêmio (2021)
- Miguel Monsalve – Grêmio (2024–)
- **Navarro Montoya** – Athletico Paranaense (2006)
- Néiser Villarreal – Cruzeiro (2026–)
- Nicolás Hernández – Athletico Paranaense (2021–2022), Internacional (2023)
- **Orlando Berrío** – Flamengo (2017–2020), América Mineiro (2021)
- **Óscar Estupiñán** – Bahia (2024)
- Oswaldo Henríquez – Sport Recife (2016–2018), Vasco da Gama (2018–2019)
- **Pablo Armero** – Palmeiras (2009–2010), Bahia (2017), CSA (2019)
- **Rafael Santos Borré** – Internacional (2024–2026)
- Reinaldo Lenis – Sport Recife (2016–2018)
- Ricardo Laborde – Náutico (2008)
- **Richard Ríos** – Flamengo (2020), Palmeiras (2023–2025)
- **Rubén Bustos** – Grêmio (2007), Internacional (2008)
- **Santiago Arias** – Bahia (2024–2025)
- **Santiago Montoya** – Vasco da Gama (2013)
- **Santiago Moreno** – Fluminense (2025–2026)
- Santiago Tréllez – Vitória (2017), São Paulo (2018, 2020), Internacional (2019)
- **Sebastián Gómez** – Coritiba (2023, 2026–)
- **Sergio Herrera** – Athletico Paranaense (2010)
- Sergio Palacios – Red Bull Bragantino (2024–2025)
- Sherman Cárdenas – Atlético Mineiro (2015), Vitória (2016–2017)
- **Stiven Mendoza** – Corinthians (2015), Bahia (2017), Ceará (2021–2022), Santos (2023), Athletico Paranaense (2026–)
- **Víctor Aristizábal** – São Paulo (1996–1998), Santos (1998–1999), Vitória (2002), Cruzeiro (2003), Coritiba (2004)
- **Víctor Cantillo** – Corinthians (2020–2023)
- **Vladimir Marín** – Athletico Paranaense (2005)
- **Vladimir Hernández** – Santos (2017)
- **Wason Rentería** – Internacional (2005–2006), Atlético Mineiro (2009), Santos (2011–2012)
- Wilder Guisao – São Paulo (2015)
- Yani Quintero – Red Bull Bragantino (2023)
- Yeferson Rodallega – Atlético Goianiense (2024)
- Yeison Guzmán – Fortaleza (2025)
- **Yerry Mina** – Palmeiras (2016-2017)
- **Yerson Candelo** – Criciúma (2024)
- Yesus Cabrera – Cuiabá (2021)
- Yílmar Filigrana – Coritiba (2017)
- **Yimmi Chará** – Atlético Mineiro (2018–2019)
- Yony González – Fluminense (2019, 2023), Corinthians (2020), Ceará (2021), Atlético Goianiense (2024)

=== Ecuador ===
- **Alan Franco** – Atlético Mineiro (2020–2021, 2023–)
- **Alan Minda** – Atlético Mineiro (2026–)
- **Álex Bolaños** – Santa Cruz (2016)
- **Ángelo Preciado** – Atlético Mineiro (2026–)
- Anthony Landázuri – Fortaleza (2022)
- **Anthony Valencia** – Flamengo (2026–)
- **Bryan Angulo** – Santos (2022)
- **Bryan Cabezas** – Fluminense (2018-2019)
- Bryan García – Athletico Paranaense (2022–2023)
- **Carlos Tenorio** – Vasco da Gama (2012–2013)
- **Cristian Penilla** – Chapecoense (2017)
- **Édison Méndez** – Atlético Mineiro (2010)
- **Enner Valencia** – Internacional (2023–2025)
- **Erick Castillo** – Vitória (2024)
- **Félix Torres** – Corinthians (2024–2025), Internacional (2026–)
- **Fernando Guerrero** – Chapecoense (2017)
- **Frickson Erazo** – Flamengo (2014), Grêmio (2015), Atlético Mineiro (2016–2017), Vasco da Gama (2018)
- **Gabriel Cortez** – Botafogo (2020)
- **Gilson de Souza** – Vasco da Gama (1989), Athletico Paranaense (1993)
- **Giovanny Espinoza** – Cruzeiro (2008)
- **Gonzalo Plata** – Flamengo (2024–)
- **Héctor Carabalí** – São Paulo (1999)
- **Helinho** – América-RJ (1969), Náutico (1972-1973), Rio Negro (1975-1976)
- **Hólger Quiñónez** – Vasco da Gama (1989–1991)
- **Jayro Campos** – Atlético Mineiro (2010)
- **Jefferson Orejuela** – Fluminense (2017)
- **Jhegson Méndez** – São Paulo (2023)
- **Jhoanner Chávez** – Bahia (2023)
- **Jhojan Julio** – Santos (2022)
- **Joao Rojas** – São Paulo (2018–2021)
- **Joffre Guerrón** – Cruzeiro (2009–2010), Athletico Paranaense (2010–2012)
- Jorge Martínez – Coritiba (1986)
- **José Cifuentes** – Cruzeiro (2024)
- **José Hurtado** – Red Bull Bragantino (2022–)
- **Juan Cazares** – Atlético Mineiro (2016–2019), Corinthians (2020), Fluminense (2021), América Mineiro (2023)
- **Junior Sornoza** – Fluminense (2017–2018), Corinthians (2019)
- **Keny Arroyo** – Cruzeiro (2025–)
- Kike Saverio – Vitória (2025–)
- **Léo Realpe** – Red Bull Bragantino (2020–2024)
- **Luis Bolaños** – Santos (2009), Internacional (2009)
- **Luis Caicedo** – Cruzeiro (2017, 2018)
- **Luis Segovia** – Botafogo (2023)
- **Mario Pineida** – Fluminense (2022)
- **Máximo Tenorio** – Vasco da Gama (1996)
- **Michael Quiñónez** – Santos (2008)
- **Michael Arroyo** – Grêmio (2017-2018)
- **Miller Bolaños** – Grêmio (2016-2017)
- **Neicer Reasco** – São Paulo (2006–2008)
- **Paes** – Portuguesa (1967-1969)
- **Patricio Urrutia** – Fluminense (2009)
- **Robert Arboleda** – São Paulo (2017–)
- Ronie Carrillo – Juventude (2024)
- **Ulises de la Cruz** – Cruzeiro (1999)
- **Wagner Rivera** – Flamengo (1996)

=== Paraguay ===
- **Adalberto Román** – Palmeiras (2012)
- **Adam Bareiro** – Fortaleza (2025)
- **Alan Benítez** – Internacional (2025)
- **Alexis Duarte** – Santos (2025–2026)
- **Ángel Romero** – Corinthians (2014–2018, 2023–2025)
- Antonio Galeano – São Paulo (2021), Ceará (2025), Mirassol (2026), Remo (2026–)
- **Antonio Sanabria** – Internacional (2026–)
- **Arnaldo Espínola** – Internacional (1997-1998), Cruzeiro (1999)
- Brian Montenegro – Athletico Goianiense (2021)
- **Carlos Coronel** – São Paulo (2026–)
- **Carlos Gamarra** – Internacional (1995–1997), Corinthians (1998–1999), Flamengo (2000–2001), Palmeiras (2005–2006)
- **Carlos Kiese** – Grêmio (1980)
- **Catalino Rivarola** – Grêmio (1995–1998), Palmeiras (1999)
- **César Benítez** – Coritiba (2016, 2018)
- **César Pinares** – Grêmio (2020–2021)
- **César Ramírez** – Flamengo (2005–2006)
- **Celso Ayala** – São Paulo (2000)
- **Cristian Riveros** – Grêmio (2013–2014)
- **Damián Bobadilla** – São Paulo (2024–)
- Derlis Florentín – Palmeiras (2007)
- **Derlis González** – Santos (2018–2020)
- **Diego Gavilán** – Internacional (2003, 2004–2005), Grêmio (2007), Flamengo (2008), Portuguesa (2008)
- **Edgar Aguilera** – Athletico Paranaense (1998)
- **Edgar Báez** – Santos (1996-1997)
- Edgar Balbuena – Corinthians (2009–2010)
- **Edgardo Orzusa** – Chapecoense (2018–2019)
- **Enrique Meza** – Sport Recife (2014), Chapecoense (2014)
- **Estanislao Struway** – Portuguesa (1997), Coritiba (1998–1999)
- **Fabián Balbuena** – Corinthians (2016–2018, 2022–2023), Grêmio (2025–)
- **Fabrizio Peralta** – Cruzeiro (2024)
- Feliciano Brizuela – Avaí (2019)
- **Félix Brítez** – Internacional (1987)
- **Francisco Arce** – Grêmio (1994–1998), Palmeiras (1998–2002)
- **Francisco Reyes** – Flamengo (1971–1973)
- Freddy Noguera – Grêmio (2023)
- **Guillermo Beltrán** – Vitória (2014)
- **Gustavo Caballero** – Santos (2025–)
- **Gustavo Gómez** – Palmeiras (2018–)
- **Gustavo Sotelo** – Cruzeiro (1995)
- Héctor Bustamante – CSA (2019)
- **Hernán Pérez** – Coritiba (2022)
- Higínio Gamarra – Comercial-MS (1975,1978), Operário-MS (1979)
- **Isidro Pitta** – Juventude (2022), Cuiabá (2023–2024), Red Bull Bragantino (2025–)
- Iván González – Athletico Paranaense (2010–2011)
- **Iván Piris** – São Paulo (2011–2012)
- Jorge González – Paraná (2018)
- **Jorge Mendoza** – Ponte Preta (2017)
- Jorge Ortega – Coritiba (2016)
- **José Benítez** – Internacional (1977,1979,1981-1983), Palmeiras (1978)
- **Jose Ortigoza** – Palmeiras, Cruzeiro, Paraná (2009, 2011–2012, 2018)
- **Juan Iturbe** – Grêmio (2023)
- **Juan Carlos Villamayor** – Corinthians (1996), Ponte Preta (1999)
- **Julio dos Santos** – Grêmio (2008), Athletico Paranaense (2008–2009), Vasco da Gama (2015–2017)
- **Julio Cáceres** – Atlético Mineiro (2005, 2010)
- **Julio César Enciso** – Internacional (1996-1999)
- **Julio Irrazábal** – Vasco da Gama (2010-2011)
- **Julio Manzur** – Santos (2006)
- **Junior Alonso** – Atlético Mineiro (2021, 2022–2026)
- **Justo Jacquet** – Internacional (1989)
- **Lucas Barrios** – Palmeiras, Grêmio (2016–2017)
- **Luis Cáceres** – Vitória (2013–2014), Coritiba (2015–2016)
- Marcelo Báez – Paraná (2018)
- Mario Saldívar – Figueirense (2012)
- **Mateo Gamarra** – Athletico Paranaense (2024), Cruzeiro (2025)
- **Mathías Villasanti** – Grêmio (2021, 2023–)
- **Matías Galarza** – Coritiba (2022), Vasco da Gama (2023)
- **Matías Rojas** – Corinthians (2023)
- Matías Segovia – Botafogo (2023)
- **Miguel Samudio** – Cruzeiro (2014)
- **Maurício** – Cruzeiro (2019), Internacional (2020-2024), Palmeiras (2024–)
- **Miguel Sanabria** – Coritiba (1988)
- **Nelson Cuevas** – Santos (2008)
- Nery Bareiro – Coritiba (2016), Chapecoense (2018)
- **Néstor Camacho** – Avaí (2015)
- **Néstor Isasi** – São Paulo (1997), América Mineiro (1998)
- **Óscar Romero** – Botafogo (2024), Internacional (2025)
- **Óscar Ruiz** – Bahia (2021), Juventude (2022)
- **Pablo Giménez** – Atlético Mineiro (2005)
- **Pablo Zeballos** – Botafogo (2014)
- **Pedro Benítez** – Atlético Mineiro (2009–2010)
- Pedro Molinas – Sport Recife (1974)
- **Raimundo Aguilera** – Portuguesa (1971), Botafogo-SP (1976-1978), Criciúma (1979)
- **Ramón Martínez** – Atlético Mineiro (2019), Coritiba (2020)
- **Ramón Sosa** – Palmeiras (2025–)
- **Raúl Bobadilla** – Fluminense (2021)
- Raúl Cáceres – Vasco da Gama (2019), América Mineiro (2022), Vitória (2024–2025)
- **Ricardo Tavarelli** – Grêmio (2004)
- Richard Franco – Avaí (2019)
- **Robert Piris Da Motta** – Flamengo (2018–2019, 2021)
- **Robert Rojas** – Vasco da Gama (2024)
- **Roberto "Gato" Fernández** – Internacional (1991–1993), Palmeiras (1994)
- **Roberto "Gatito" Fernández** – Vitória (2014–2015), Figueirense (2016), Botafogo (2017–2020, 2022–2024)
- **Rodolfo Gamarra** – CSA (2019)
- **Romerito** – Fluminense (1984–1988)
- Rubén Lezcano – Fluminense (2025)
- **Sebastián Ferreira** – Vasco da Gama (2023)
- **Sergio Díaz** – Corinthians (2018–2019)
- **Víctor Cáceres** – Flamengo (2012–2015)
- **Víctor Quintana** – Cruzeiro (2002)
- Walter Clar – Chapecoense (2026)
- **William Mendieta** – Palmeiras (2014)
- **Wilson Pittoni** – Figueirense (2011–2012), Bahia (2014, 2015)

=== Peru ===
- **Abel Lobatón** – Athletico Paranaense (2000, 2003)
- **Alberto Gallardo** – Palmeiras (1966–1968)
- Alexander Lecaros – Botafogo (2020)
- **André Carrillo** – Corinthians (2024–)
- **Beto da Silva** – Grêmio (2017-2018)
- **Christian Cueva** – São Paulo (2016–2018), Santos (2019)
- **Erick Noriega** – Grêmio (2025–)
- Fernando Pacheco – Fluminense (2020), Juventude (2021)
- **Flavio Maestri** – Vitória (2003-2004)
- **Kevin Quevedo** – Goiás (2020)
- **Luis Advíncula** – Ponte Preta (2013)
- **Luis Ramírez** – Corinthians (2011–2013), Ponte Preta (2013), Botafogo (2014)
- **Marko Ciurlizza** – Botafogo (2001)
- **Martín Hidalgo** – Internacional (2006–2008)
- **Miguel Trauco** – Flamengo (2017–2019), Criciúma (2024)
- **Paolo Guerrero** – Corinthians (2012–2015), Flamengo (2015–2018), Internacional (2019–2021), Avaí (2022)
- **Roberto Palacios** – Cruzeiro (1997)
- **Raúl Ruidíaz** – Coritiba (2012–2013)
- **Yoshimar Yotún** – Vasco da Gama (2013)

=== Uruguay ===
- **Abel Hernández** – Internacional (2020), Fluminense (2021)
- Adán Machado – Cruzeiro (1982)
- **Agustín Canobbio** – Athletico Paranaense (2022–2024), Fluminense (2025–)
- **Agustín Rogel** – Internacional (2024–2025)
- Agustín Sant'Anna – Red Bull Bragantino (2025–)
- Alan Rodríguez – Internacional (2025–2026)
- Alan Saldivia – Vasco da Gama (2026–)
- Alberto Acosta – Náutico (2007), Corinthians (2009)
- Alejo Cruz – Atlético Goianiense (2024)
- **Alfredo Lamas** – Internacional (1969)
- **Alvaro Pereira** – São Paulo (2014)
- **Ángel Brunell** – Fluminense (1973-1974)
- **Atilio Ancheta** – Grêmio (1971-1980)
- Baltasar Barcia – Criciúma (2024)
- Braian Rodríguez – Grêmio (2015–2016)
- **Brian Ocampo** – Coritiba (2026–)
- **Bruno Méndez** – Corinthians (2019–2020, 2022–2023), Internacional (2021–2022)
- **Bruno Silva** – Internacional (2010)
- Camilo Cándido – Bahia (2023)
- Carlos Borges – CSA (1986)
- Carlos Cabrera – Sport Recife (1977–1978)
- Carlos de Pena – Internacional (2022–2023), Bahia (2024)
- **Carlos Gutiérrez** – Atlético Mineiro (2002–2003)
- **Carlos Nicola** – Athletico Paranaense (2000–2001)
- **Carlos Sánchez** – Santos (2018–2022)
- César Pereyra – Santos (1988)
- Christian Oliva – Santos (2026–)
- Cláudio Milar – Juventude (1997), Botafogo (2001)
- **Cristian Olivera** – Grêmio (2025), Bahia (2026–)
- **Damián Suárez** – Botafogo (2024)
- Daniel González – Portuguesa (1978, 1980–1981), Corinthians (1982–1983), Vasco da Gama (1983–1985)
- **Danilo Menezes** – Vasco da Gama (1965, 1967-1969), ABC (1972, 1976-1979)
- **Darío Pereyra** – São Paulo (1977–1988), Flamengo (1988), Palmeiras (1989)
- **David Terans** – Atlético Mineiro (2018–2019), Athletico Paranaense (2021–2023), Fluminense (2024)
- Diego Aguirre – Internacional (1989), São Paulo (1990), Portuguesa (1991)
- **Diego Forlán** – Internacional (2012-2013)
- **Diego Godín** – Atlético Mineiro (2022)
- Diego Hernández – Botafogo (2023–2024), Remo (2026)
- **Diego Lugano** – São Paulo (2003-2006, 2016–2017)
- Dorotéo Rocha – Vitória (1988)
- **Éber Moas** – Vitória (1997)
- **Egidio Arévalo Ríos** – Botafogo (2011)
- **Emiliano Martínez** – Red Bull Bragantino (2021), Palmeiras (2025–)
- Emiliano Rodríguez – Atlético Goianiense (2024)
- **Emiliano Velázquez** – Santos (2021–2022)
- **Fabián Carini** – Atlético Mineiro (2009–2010)
- Fabricio Domínguez – Sport Recife (2025)
- Facundo Bernal – Fluminense (2024–2026)
- **Facundo Torres** – Palmeiras (2025)
- Federico Barrandeguy – Botafogo (2020)
- Federico Gino – Cruzeiro (2016)
- **Felipe Carballo** – Grêmio (2023–2024)
- **Fernando Kanapkis** – Atlético Mineiro (1993–1994)
- **Fernando Álvez** – Botafogo (1987)
- Fernando Rosa – Atlético Mineiro (1993–1994)
- Francisco Salomón – Internacional (1978)
- **Franco Catarozzi** – Remo (2026–)
- Franco Rossi – Chapecoense (2026–)
- Gabriel Clemata – Athletico Paranaense (1982)
- **Gabriel Neves** – São Paulo (2021–2023)
- **Giorgian De Arrascaeta** – Cruzeiro (2015–2018), Flamengo (2019–)
- **Gonzalo Carneiro** – São Paulo (2018–2020)
- Gonzalo Freitas – Atlético Goianiense (2024)
- Gonzalo Mastriani – América Mineiro (2022–2023), Athletico Paranaense (2024), Botafogo (2025)
- **Gonzalo Sorondo** – Internacional (2007–2011)
- Guillermo de los Santos – Coritiba (2022)
- **Guillermo Varela** – Flamengo (2022–)
- **Gustavo Matosas** – São Paulo (1993), Athletico Paranaense (1996), Goiás (1997)
- Guzmán Rodríguez – Red Bull Bragantino (2025–)
- **Hebert Revetria** – Cruzeiro (1977-1978)
- **Héctor Cincunegui** – Atlético Mineiro (1971–1973)
- **Héctor Silva** – Palmeiras (1970-1971), Portuguesa (1972)
- **Horacio Peralta** – Flamengo (2006)
- **Hugo de León** – Grêmio (1981–1984), Corinthians (1984–1985), Santos (1986–1987), Botafogo (1991)
- **Ignacio Laquintana** – Red Bull Bragantino (2023–2025), Vitória (2026–)
- Ignacio Ramírez – Sport Recife (2025)
- Ignacio Sosa – Red Bull Bragantino (2026–)
- Isabelino Ramírez – América Mineiro (1979), Londrina (1981)
- Javier Méndez – América Mineiro (2023)
- Jesús Trindade – Coritiba (2022)
- Joaquín Lavega – Fluminense (2025), Coritiba (2026–)
- **Joaquín Piquerez** – Palmeiras (2021–)
- Jonatan Álvez – Internacional (2018–2019)
- Jorge Caraballo – Goiás (1986–1987)
- **Jorge Manicera** – Flamengo (1968-1969)
- **Jorge Oyarbide** – Grêmio (1968)
- **José Luis Rodríguez** – Vasco da Gama (2023–)
- **José Urruzmendi** – Internacional (1969)
- Juan Ahuntchain – Vasco da Gama (1980)
- **Juan Castillo** – Botafogo (2008–2009)
- Juan de Lima – Botafogo (1987)
- Juan Pintado – Goiás (2020)
- Juan Manuel Olivera – Náutico (2013)
- **Juan Ramón Carrasco** – São Paulo (1990)
- Juan Salgueiro – Botafogo (2016)
- Kevin Ramírez – Chapecoense (2026–)
- **Ladislao Mazurkiewicz** – Atlético Mineiro (1972–1974)
- Leandro Barcia – Goiás (2019), Sport Recife (2020–2021), Atlético Goianiense (2022)
- **Leo Percovich** – Guarani (1995), Fluminense (1996)
- Leonardo Fernández – Fluminense (2023)
- Lucas Hernández – Atlético Mineiro (2019), Cuiabá (2021)
- **Lucas Monzón** – Botafogo (2026–)
- Lucas Olaza – Athletico Paranaense (2014–2015)
- Lucas Villalba – Botafogo (2026–)
- **Luciano Rodríguez** – Bahia (2024–2025), Cruzeiro (2026–)
- Luis Aguiar – Vitória (2014)
- **Luis Maidana** – Palmeiras (1966)
- **Luis Suárez** – Gremio (2023)
- Marcelo Lipatín – Coritiba (2000), Grêmio (2006)
- Marcelo Palau – Athletico Paranaense (2013)
- **Marco Vanzini** – Juventude (2007)
- **Martín Silva** – Vasco da Gama (2015, 2017–2018)
- Martín Taborda – Corinthians (1978–1979, 1981–1982), Coritiba (1980), Sport Recife (1980), Portuguesa (1982, 1984)
- Mateo Ponte – Botafogo (2023–)
- **Matías Arezo** – Grêmio (2024–2025)
- **Matías Viña** – Palmeiras (2020–2021), Flamengo (2024–2025), Cruzeiro (2026–)
- **Mauricio Lemos** – Atlético Mineiro (2023–2024), Vasco da Gama (2025)
- **Mauricio Victorino** – Cruzeiro (2011–2014), Palmeiras (2014)
- Maxi Rodríguez – Grêmio (2013–2015)
- Maximiliano Silvera – Santos (2023)
- Michel Araújo – Fluminense (2020, 2022), São Paulo (2023–2024), Bahia (2025–)
- Miguel Merentiel – Palmeiras (2022)
- Nico Hernández – Vitória (1998)
- Nicolás Acevedo – Bahia (2023–)
- **Nicolás de la Cruz** – Flamengo (2024–)
- **Nicolás Fonseca** – Coritiba (2026–)
- Nicolás Freitas – Internacional (2015)
- Nicolás Ferreira – Remo (2026)
- **Nicolás Lodeiro** – Botafogo (2012–2014), Corinthians (2014–2015)
- Nicolás López – Internacional (2016–2019)
- Nicolás Quagliata – Cuiabá (2023)
- Niki – Botafogo (1995–1996)
- **Obdulio Trasante** – Grêmio (1988-1989)
- **Óscar Aguirregaray** – Internacional (1988-1989), Palmeiras (1990-1991)
- Pablo Ceppelini – Cuiabá (2023)
- **Pablo Forlán** – São Paulo (1971–1975), Cruzeiro (1976)
- Pablo García – Coritiba (2022)
- Pablo Siles – Athletico Paranaense (2022)
- Pedro Kraus – Palmeiras (1970)
- Pedro Milans – Corinthians (2026–)
- **Pedro Rocha** – São Paulo (1970–1978), Coritiba (1978), Palmeiras (1979)
- Pedro Varela – Botafogo (1988)
- Rafael Haller – Atlético Goianiense (2024)
- Renzo López – Vitória (2025–2026)
- **Richard Morales** – Grêmio (2008)
- **Robert Flores** – Sport Recife (2014)
- **Rodolfo Rodríguez** – Santos (1984–1988), Portuguesa (1990–1992), Bahia (1992–1994)
- **Rodrigo Aguirre** – Botafogo (2018)
- Rodrigo Fernández – Santos (2022–2023)
- Rogelio Ramírez – Portuguesa (1984)
- **Rubén Paz** – Internacional (1982-1985)
- Santiago García – Athletico Paranaense (2011–2012)
- Santiago Rodríguez – Botafogo (2025–2026)
- **Sebastián Abreu** – Grêmio (1998), Botafogo (2010–2012), Figueirense (2012)
- **Sebastián Eguren** – Palmeiras (2014)
- **Sergio Ramírez** – Flamengo (1977–1979), Sport Recife (1980), Ferroviário-CE (1981), Campo Grande (1983), Pinheiros (1985)
- Sergio Orteman – Grêmio (2008–2009)
- **Sergio Rochet** – Internacional (2023–)
- **Sergio Santín** – Santos (1986)
- **Thiago Borbas** – Red Bull Bragantino (2023–2025), Atlético Mineiro (2026–)
- **Víctor Diogo** – Palmeiras (1986-1987)
- **Walter Corbo** – Grêmio (1977-1978)
- **Walter Olivera** – Atlético Mineiro (1984-1985)
- Washington Aguerre – América Mineiro (2023)

=== Venezuela ===
- **Alejandro Guerra** – Palmeiras (2017–2019), Bahia (2019)
- **Alexander Rondón** – São Paulo (2004)
- **Ángelo Peña** – Náutico (2013–2014)
- Breitner – Santos (2010, 2011), Náutico (2012)
- **César González** – Coritiba (2016–2017)
- Cristhian Rivas – Cuiabá (2022)
- **Jan Hurtado** – Red Bull Bragantino (2021–2022), Atlético Goianiense (2024)
- **Jefferson Savarino** – Atlético Mineiro (2020–2021), Botafogo (2024–2025), Fluminense (2026–)
- **Jhon Chancellor** – Coritiba (2022–2023)
- **José Martínez** – Corinthians (2024–2025)
- **Kervin Andrade** – Fortaleza (2024–2025)
- **Luis Manuel Seijas** – Chapecoense (2016–2018)
- **Matías Lacava** – Santos (2021), Atlético Goianiense (2024)
- **Nahuel Ferraresi** – São Paulo (2022–2026), Botafogo (2026–)
- **Rómulo Otero** – Atlético Mineiro (2016–2018, 2019–2021), Corinthians (2021), Fortaleza (2022)
- **Tomás Rincón** – Santos (2023, 2025–2026)
- **Vito Fassano** – Cruzeiro (1967–1969)
- **Wilker Ángel** – Criciúma (2024), Juventude (2025)
- **Yeferson Soteldo** – Santos (2019–2021, 2022–2023, 2025), Grêmio (2024), Fluminense (2025–)

== Notes ==
1. Born in Angola
2. Born in Angola (then Portuguese Angola)
3. Born in Argentina
4. Born in Brazil
5. Born in England
6. Born in France
7. Born in Germany
8. Born in Ghana
9. Born in Italy
10. Born in Japan
11. Born in Netherlands
12. Born in Paraguay
13. Born in Portugal
14. Born in Réunion (Overseas department of the French Republic)
15. Born in South Africa
16. Born in Suriname
17. Born in the United States
18. Born in Venezuela
19. Born in a country which was then part of SFR Yugoslavia
20. Capped for the Argentina national under-20 football team
21. Capped for the Brazil national team
22. Capped for the Brazil national under-23 football team
23. Capped for the Brazil national under-20 football team
24. Capped for the Brazil national under-18 football team
25. Capped for the Brazil national under-17 football team
26. Capped for the France national under-19 football team
27. Capped for the Galicia national football team
28. Capped for the Japan national under-19 football team
29. Capped for the Netherlands national under-17 team
30. Capped for the Netherlands national under-20 team
31. Capped for the Netherlands national under-21 team
32. Capped for the Portugal national under-20 football team
33. Capped for the Spain national under-19 football team
34. Capped for the United States national under-19 football team
35. Capped for the FR Yugoslavia national football team
36. Capped for the FR Yugoslavia national under-21 football team
