= 2018 Campeonato Brasileiro Série A =

Campeonato Brasileiro Série A
- Season: 2018
- Dates: 14 April – 2 December 2018
- Champions: Palmeiras (10th title)
- Relegated: Sport; América Mineiro; Vitória; Paraná
- Copa Libertadores: Palmeiras; Cruzeiro (cup winners); Flamengo; Internacional; Grêmio; São Paulo; Atlético Mineiro; Atlético Paranaense (Copa Sudamericana winners)
- Copa Sudamericana: Botafogo; Santos; Bahia; Fluminense; Corinthians; Chapecoense
- Matches: 380
- Goals: 827 (2.18 per match)
- Top goalscorer: Gabriel Barbosa (18 goals)
- Biggest home win: Atlético-PR 5–1 Chapecoense (15 April 2018); Grêmio 5–1 Santos (6 May 2018); Atlético-PR 4–0 Vitória (29 July 2018); Grêmio 4–0 Vitória (12 August 2018); Grêmio 4–0 Botafogo (1 September 2018); Atlético-PR 4–0 América-MG (6 October 2018); Fluminense 4–0 Paraná (8 October 2018); Atlético-PR 4–0 Sport (14 October 2018); Palmeiras 4–0 América-MG (21 November 2018)
- Biggest away win: Paraná 0–4 Corinthians (22 April 2018); Paraná 0–4 Flamengo (21 October 2018)
- Highest scoring: Santos 5–2 Vitória (3 June 2018); Atlético-MG 5–2 Fluminense (10 June 2018); Vitória 3–4 Botafogo (23 September 2018); Atlético-MG 5–2 Sport (30 September 2018); Grêmio 3–4 Sport (27 October 2018)
- Longest unbeaten run: Palmeiras (23 games)

The 2018 Campeonato Brasileiro Série A (officially the Brasileirão Assaí 2018 for sponsorship reasons) was the 62nd season of the Campeonato Brasileiro Série A, the top level of professional football in Brazil, and the 16th edition in a double round-robin since its establishment in 2003. The season began on 14 April 2018 and ended on 2 December 2018. The top six teams as well as the 2018 Copa do Brasil champions qualified to the Copa Libertadores. The next six best-placed teams not qualified for Copa Libertadores qualified for the Copa Sudamericana and the last four were relegated to Série B in 2019.

Palmeiras won their 10th title, which is the most titles in the tournament.

== Teams ==
Location of teams in 2018 Série A

Twenty teams competed in the league – the top sixteen teams from the previous season, as well as four teams promoted from the Série B.

América Mineiro became the first club to be promoted after a 1–2 win against Figueirense on 11 November 2017. Internacional was promoted on 14 November 2017, and Paraná and Ceará were promoted on 18 November 2017.

Pos.	Relegated from 2017 Série A
17º	Coritiba
18º	Avaí
19º	Ponte Preta
20º	Atlético Goianiense

Pos.	Promoted from 2017 Série B
1º	América Mineiro
2º	Internacional
3°	Ceará
4º	Paraná

=== Number of teams by state ===
Number of teams	State	Team(s)
4	Rio de Janeiro	Botafogo, Flamengo, Fluminense and Vasco da Gama
4	São Paulo	Corinthians, Palmeiras, Santos and São Paulo
3	Minas Gerais	América Mineiro, Atlético Mineiro and Cruzeiro
2	Bahia	Bahia and Vitória
2	Paraná	Atlético Paranaense and Paraná
2	Rio Grande do Sul	Grêmio and Internacional
1	Ceará	Ceará
1	Pernambuco	Sport
1	Santa Catarina	Chapecoense

=== Stadiums and locations ===
Team	Location	State	Stadium	Capacity
América Mineiro	Belo Horizonte	Minas Gerais	Independência	23,018
Atlético Mineiro	Belo Horizonte	Minas Gerais	Independência	23,018
Atlético Paranaense	Curitiba	Paraná	Arena da Baixada	42,370
Bahia	Salvador	Bahia	Arena Fonte Nova; Pituaçu (2 matches)	47,907; 32,157
Botafogo	Rio de Janeiro	Rio de Janeiro	Olímpico Nilton Santos	44,661
Ceará	Fortaleza	Ceará	Arena Castelão; Presidente Vargas (5 matches)	63,903; 20,268
Chapecoense	Chapecó	Santa Catarina	Arena Condá	20,089
Corinthians	São Paulo	São Paulo	Arena Corinthians	47,605
Cruzeiro	Belo Horizonte	Minas Gerais	Mineirão; Independência (one match)	61,846; 23,018
Flamengo	Rio de Janeiro	Rio de Janeiro	Maracanã	78,838
Fluminense	Rio de Janeiro	Rio de Janeiro	Maracanã; Olímpico Nilton Santos (2 matches); Mané Garrincha (one match)	78,838; 72,788; 44,661
Grêmio	Porto Alegre	Rio Grande do Sul	Arena do Grêmio	55,662
Internacional	Porto Alegre	Rio Grande do Sul	Beira-Rio	50,128
Palmeiras	São Paulo	São Paulo	Allianz Parque; Pacaembu (4 matches)	43,713; 37,730
Paraná	Curitiba	Paraná	Vila Capanema; Estádio do Café (one match)	17,140; 30,000
Santos	Santos	São Paulo	Vila Belmiro; Pacaembu (7 matches)	16,068; 37,730
São Paulo	São Paulo	São Paulo	Morumbi	72,039
Sport	Recife	Pernambuco	Ilha do Retiro; Arena Pernambuco (one match)	32,983; 44,300
Vasco da Gama	Rio de Janeiro	Rio de Janeiro	São Januário; Mané Garrincha (2 matches); Maracanã (one match)	24,584; 72,788; 78,838
Vitória	Salvador	Bahia	Barradão	34,535

== Personnel and kits ==
Team	Manager	Captain	Kit manufacturer	Shirt main sponsor
América Mineiro	(Brazil) Givanildo Oliveira	(Brazil) Rafael Lima	Lupo	Caixa
Atlético Mineiro	(Brazil) Levir Culpi	(Brazil) Léo Silva	Topper	Caixa
Atlético Paranaense	(Brazil) Tiago Nunes	(Brazil) Thiago Heleno	Umbro	Caixa
Bahia	(Brazil) Enderson Moreira	(Brazil) Tiago	Esquadrão	Caixa
Botafogo	(Brazil) Zé Ricardo	(Brazil) Rodrigo Lindoso	Topper	Caixa
Ceará	(Brazil) Lisca	(Brazil) Rafael Pereira	Topper	Caixa
Chapecoense	(Brazil) Claudinei Oliveira	(Brazil) Wellington Paulista	Umbro	Aurora
Corinthians	(Brazil) Jair Ventura	Various	Nike	Vacant
Cruzeiro	(Brazil) Mano Menezes	(Brazil) Henrique	Umbro	Caixa
Flamengo	(Brazil) Dorival Júnior	(Brazil) Réver	Adidas	Caixa
Fluminense	(Brazil) Fábio Moreno	(Brazil) Gum	Under Armour	Valle Express
Grêmio	(Brazil) Renato Gaúcho	(Brazil) Maicon	Umbro	Banrisul
Internacional	(Brazil) Odair Hellmann	(Argentina) Andrés D'Alessandro	Nike	Banrisul
Palmeiras	(Brazil) Luiz Felipe Scolari	(Brazil) Bruno Henrique	Adidas	Crefisa
Paraná	(Brazil) Dado Cavalcanti	(Brazil) Leandro Vilela	Topper	Caixa
Santos	(Brazil) Cuca	(Brazil) Renato	Umbro	Caixa
São Paulo	(Brazil) André Jardine	(Brazil) Hudson	Adidas	Banco Inter
Sport	(Brazil) Milton Mendes	(Brazil) Durval	Under Armour	Caixa
Vasco da Gama	(Brazil) Alberto Valentim	(Uruguay) Martín Silva	Diadora	Vacant
Vitória	(Brazil) Joao Burse (caretaker)	(Brazil) Willian Farias	Topper	Caixa

=== Managerial changes ===
Team	Outgoing manager	Manner of departure	Date of vacancy	Position in table	Incoming manager	Date of appointment
Sport	(Brazil) Nelsinho Baptista	Resigned	24 April	17th	(Brazil) Claudinei Oliveira	25 April
Ceará	(Brazil) Marcelo Chamusca	Sacked	20 May	19th	(Brazil) Jorginho	21 May
Corinthians	(Brazil) Fábio Carille	Signed by Al-Wehda	22 May	4th	(Brazil) Osmar Loss	23 May
Vasco da Gama	(Brazil) Zé Ricardo	Resigned	2 June	12th	(Brazil) Valdir Bigode (caretaker)	2 June
Bahia	(Brazil) Guto Ferreira	Sacked	3 June	18th	(Brazil) Cláudio Prates (caretaker)	4 June
Ceará	(Brazil) Jorginho	Resigned	4 June	20th	(Brazil) Lisca	4 June
Vasco da Gama	(Brazil) Valdir Bigode	End of caretaker tenure	6 June	13th	(Brazil) Jorginho	7 June
Fluminense	(Brazil) Abel Braga	Resigned	16 June	12th	(Brazil) Marcelo Oliveira	22 June
América Mineiro	(Brazil) Enderson Moreira	Signed by Bahia	16 June	13th	(Brazil) Ricardo Drubscky	19 June
Bahia	(Brazil) Cláudio Prates	End of caretaker tenure	16 June	17th	(Brazil) Enderson Moreira	16 June
Botafogo	(Brazil) Alberto Valentim	Resigned	19 June	9th	(Brazil) Marcos Paquetá	26 June
Atlético Paranaense	(Brazil) Fernando Diniz	Sacked	25 June	18th	(Brazil) Tiago Nunes	27 June
América Mineiro	(Brazil) Ricardo Drubscky	Sacked	24 July	17th	(Brazil) Adílson Batista	24 July
Santos	(Brazil) Jair Ventura	Sacked	26 July	15th	(Brazil) Cuca	29 July
Palmeiras	(Brazil) Roger Machado	Sacked	26 July	6th	(Brazil) Luiz Felipe Scolari	26 July
Vitória	(Brazil) Vágner Mancini	Sacked	28 July	16th	(Brazil) Paulo César Carpegiani	14 August
Botafogo	(Brazil) Marcos Paquetá	Sacked	1 August	11th	(Brazil) Zé Ricardo	3 August
Chapecoense	(Brazil) Gilson Kleina	Sacked	6 August	16th	(Brazil) Guto Ferreira	6 August
Sport	(Brazil) Claudinei Oliveira	Resigned	12 August	14th	(Brazil) Eduardo Baptista	15 August
Vasco da Gama	(Brazil) Jorginho	Sacked	13 August	15th	(Brazil) Alberto Valentim	27 August
Paraná	(Brazil) Rogério Micale	Sacked	14 August	20th	(Brazil) Claudinei Oliveira	15 August
Corinthians	(Brazil) Osmar Loss	Resigned	5 September	8th	(Brazil) Jair Ventura	6 September
Sport	(Brazil) Eduardo Baptista	Sacked	24 September	14th	(Brazil) Milton Mendes	26 September
Flamengo	(Brazil) Mauricio Barbieri	Sacked	28 September	4th	(Brazil) Dorival Júnior	28 September
Chapecoense	(Brazil) Guto Ferreira	Sacked	15 October	17th	(Brazil) Claudinei Oliveira	16 October
Paraná	(Brazil) Claudinei Oliveira	Signed by Chapecoense	16 October	20th	(Brazil) Dado Cavalcanti	17 October
Atlético Mineiro	(Brazil) Thiago Larghi	Sacked	17 October	6th	(Brazil) Levir Culpi	17 October
América Mineiro	(Brazil) Adílson Batista	Sacked	10 November	18th	(Brazil) Givanildo Oliveira	11 November
Fluminense	(Brazil) Marcelo Oliveira	Sacked	29 November	14th	(Brazil) Fábio Moreno	29 November

=== Foreign players ===
The clubs can have a maximum of five foreign players in their Campeonato Brasileiro squads per match, but there is no limit of foreigners in the clubs' squads.

Club	Player 1	Player 2	Player 3	Player 4	Player 5	Player 6
América Mineiro						
Atlético Mineiro	(Ecuador) Juan Cazares	(Argentina) Tomás Andrade	(Colombia) Yimmi Chará	(Uruguay) David Terans	(Uruguay) Martín Rea	
Atlético Paranaense	(Argentina) Lucho González	(Colombia) Anderson Plata				
Bahia	(Argentina) Agustín Allione					
Botafogo	(Argentina) Joel Carli	(Paraguay) Junior Fernández	(Chile) Leonardo Valencia	(Uruguay) Rodrigo Aguirre		
Ceará	(Colombia) Javier Reina	(Colombia) Jown Cardona				
Chapecoense	(Argentina) Héctor Canteros	(Paraguay) Nery Bareiro	(Argentina) Agustín Doffo	(Argentina) Diego Torres	(Paraguay) Edgardo Orzuza	
Corinthians	(Paraguay) Ángel Romero	(Qatar) Emerson Sheik^{1}	(Paraguay) Sergio Díaz	(Chile) Ángelo Araos		
Cruzeiro	(Uruguay) Giorgian De Arrascaeta	(Argentina) Ariel Cabral	(Argentina) Lucas Romero	(Argentina) Federico Mancuello	(Argentina) Hernán Barcos	
Flamengo	(Colombia) Gustavo Cuéllar	(Peru) Miguel Trauco	(Colombia) Orlando Berrío	(Colombia) Marlos Moreno	(Colombia) Fernando Uribe	(Paraguay) Robert Piris Da Motta
Fluminense	(Uruguay) Guillermo de Amores	(Ecuador) Junior Sornoza	(Ecuador) Bryan Cabezas			
Grêmio	(Argentina) Walter Kannemann					
Internacional	(Argentina) Andrés D'Alessandro	(Uruguay) Nicolás López	(Argentina) Víctor Cuesta	(Uruguay) Jonathan Álvez	(Argentina) Martín Sarrafiore	(Peru) Paolo Guerrero
Palmeiras	(Colombia) Miguel Borja	(Venezuela) Alejandro Guerra	(Argentina) Nicolás Freire	(Paraguay) Gustavo Gómez		
Paraná	(Paraguay) Marcelo Báez	(Paraguay) Jorge González				
Santos	(Colombia) Jonathan Copete	(Costa Rica) Bryan Ruiz	(Uruguay) Carlos Sánchez	(Paraguay) Derlis González		
São Paulo	(Colombia) Santiago Tréllez	(Ecuador) Robert Arboleda	(Uruguay) Gonzalo Carneiro	(Ecuador) Joao Rojas		
Sport						
Vasco da Gama	(Uruguay) Martín Silva	(Argentina) Maxi López	(Argentina) Andrés Ríos	(Argentina) Leandro Desábato	(Colombia) Oswaldo Henríquez	
Vitória	(Argentina) Marcelo Meli	(Argentina) Marcelo Benítez	(Argentina) Walter Bou			

- ^{1} Players holding Brazilian dual nationality.

== Standings ==
=== League table ===
Pos	Team	Pld	W	D	L	GF	GA	GD	Pts	Qualification or relegation
1	Palmeiras (C)	38	23	11	4	64	26	+38	80	Qualification for Copa Libertadores group stage
2	Flamengo	38	21	9	8	59	29	+30	72	Qualification for Copa Libertadores group stage
3	Internacional	38	19	12	7	51	29	+22	69	Qualification for Copa Libertadores group stage
4	Grêmio	38	18	12	8	48	27	+21	66	Qualification for Copa Libertadores group stage
5	São Paulo	38	16	15	7	46	34	+12	63	Qualification for Copa Libertadores second stage
6	Atlético Mineiro	38	17	8	13	56	43	+13	59	Qualification for Copa Libertadores second stage
7	Atlético Paranaense	38	16	9	13	54	37	+17	57	Qualification for Copa Libertadores group stage (Note: Atlético Paranaense qualified for the Copa Libertadores group stage by winning the 2018 Copa Sudamericana.)
8	Cruzeiro	38	14	11	13	34	34	0	53	Qualification for Copa Libertadores group stage (Note: Cruzeiro qualified for the Copa Libertadores group stage by winning the 2018 Copa do Brasil.)
9	Botafogo	38	13	12	13	38	46	−8	51	Qualification for Copa Sudamericana first stage
10	Santos	38	13	11	14	46	40	+6	50	Qualification for Copa Sudamericana first stage
11	Bahia	38	12	12	14	39	41	−2	48	Qualification for Copa Sudamericana first stage
12	Fluminense	38	12	9	17	32	46	−14	45	Qualification for Copa Sudamericana first stage
13	Corinthians	38	11	11	16	34	35	−1	44	Qualification for Copa Sudamericana first stage
14	Chapecoense	38	11	11	16	34	50	−16	44	Qualification for Copa Sudamericana first stage
15	Ceará	38	10	14	14	32	38	−6	44	
16	Vasco da Gama	38	10	13	15	41	48	−7	43	
17	América Mineiro (R)	38	10	10	18	30	47	−17	40	Relegation to Campeonato Brasileiro Série B
18	Sport (Note: Sport were deducted three points for the late payment of salary of player Gabriel.) (R)	38	11	9	18	35	57	−22	39	Relegation to Campeonato Brasileiro Série B
19	Vitória (R)	38	9	10	19	36	63	−27	37	Relegation to Campeonato Brasileiro Série B
20	Paraná (R)	38	4	11	23	18	57	−39	23	Relegation to Campeonato Brasileiro Série B

Source: CBF
Rules for classification: 1) points; 2) wins; 3) goal difference; 4) goals scored; 5) head-to-head results; 6) least red cards received; 7) least yellow cards received; 8) draw.
(C) Champions; (R) Relegated

== Results ==
Home \ Away	AMG	CAM	CAP	BAH	BOT	CEA	CHA	COR	CRU	FLA	FLU	GRE	INT	PAL	PAR	SAN	SPA	SPT	VAS	VIT
América Mineiro	—	1–3	3–1	1–0	1–0	0–0	0–0	0–0	1–2	2–2	0–0	1–1	2–1	0–0	0–1	2–1	1–3	3–0	2–1	2–1
Atlético Mineiro	0–0	—	3–1	1–0	1–0	2–1	3–3	1–0	1–0	0–1	5–2	0–1	0–1	1–1	2–0	3–1	1–0	5–2	0–0	2–1
Atlético Paranaense	4–0	1–2	—	2–0	2–1	2–2	5–1	1–0	2–0	3–0	3–1	2–1	2–2	1–3	3–0	2–0	0–1	4–0	1–0	4–0
Bahia	1–0	2–2	0–0	—	3–3	2–1	1–0	1–0	0–0	0–0	2–0	0–2	0–1	1–1	2–0	1–0	2–2	2–0	3–0	4–1
Botafogo	1–0	0–3	2–0	0–1	—	0–0	1–0	1–0	1–1	2–1	2–1	2–1	1–0	1–1	2–1	0–0	2–2	2–0	1–1	1–1
Ceará	2–2	2–1	0–0	0–2	0–0	—	3–1	2–1	0–1	0–3	1–0	0–1	1–1	2–2	1–0	1–1	0–0	1–0	0–0	2–0
Chapecoense	1–0	1–0	2–1	1–1	0–1	2–0	—	2–1	2–0	3–2	1–2	1–1	2–1	1–2	1–1	0–0	1–0	2–1	1–1	0–1
Corinthians	1–0	1–1	0–0	2–1	2–0	1–1	0–0	—	2–0	0–3	2–1	0–1	1–1	1–0	1–0	1–1	1–1	2–1	1–0	0–0
Cruzeiro	3–1	0–0	2–1	1–1	1–0	0–2	3–0	1–0	—	0–2	2–1	0–1	0–0	1–0	3–1	2–1	0–2	2–0	1–1	3–0
Flamengo	2–0	2–1	1–2	2–0	2–0	0–1	2–0	1–0	1–0	—	3–0	2–0	2–0	1–1	2–0	1–0	0–1	4–1	1–1	1–0
Fluminense	1–0	1–0	2–0	1–1	1–0	0–0	3–1	1–0	1–0	0–2	—	0–1	0–3	1–0	4–0	0–1	1–1	0–0	0–1	0–0
Grêmio	1–0	2–0	0–0	2–2	4–0	3–2	2–0	1–0	1–1	2–0	0–0	—	0–0	0–2	2–0	5–1	2–1	3–4	2–1	4–0
Internacional	2–0	1–2	2–1	2–0	3–0	1–0	3–0	2–1	0–0	2–1	2–0	1–0	—	0–0	1–0	2–2	3–1	0–0	3–1	2–1
Palmeiras	4–0	3–2	2–0	3–0	2–0	2–1	0–0	1–0	3–1	1–1	3–0	2–0	1–0	—	3–0	3–2	3–1	2–3	1–0	3–2
Paraná	1–0	0–1	0–0	1–0	1–1	0–1	1–1	0–4	1–1	0–4	2–1	0–0	1–1	1–1	—	0–2	1–1	1–2	1–1	1–1
Santos	0–1	3–2	1–0	2–0	1–1	2–0	0–1	1–0	0–1	1–1	3–0	0–0	1–2	1–1	3–1	—	0–0	3–0	1–1	5–2
São Paulo	1–1	2–2	0–0	1–0	3–2	1–0	2–0	3–1	1–0	2–2	1–1	1–1	0–0	0–2	1–0	1–0	—	0–0	2–1	3–0
Sport	0–2	3–2	1–0	2–0	1–1	1–0	1–1	1–1	0–0	0–1	1–2	0–0	2–1	0–1	1–0	2–1	1–3	—	2–1	0–0
Vasco da Gama	4–1	2–1	1–1	2–1	1–2	1–1	3–1	1–4	2–0	1–1	1–1	1–0	1–1	0–1	1–0	0–3	2–0	3–2	—	2–3
Vitória	1–0	1–0	1–2	2–2	3–4	2–1	1–0	2–2	1–1	2–2	1–2	0–0	2–3	0–3	1–0	0–1	0–1	1–0	1–0	—

Source: CBF
Legend: Blue = home team win; Yellow = draw; Red = away team win.

== Attendance ==
=== Average home attendances ===
As of 1 December 2018

Ranked from highest to lowest average attendance.

Pos.	Team	Stadium	GP	Cumulative	Average
1	Flamengo	Maracanã	19	895,641	47,139
2	São Paulo	Morumbi	19	652,080	34,320
3	Palmeiras	Allianz Parque	19	614,764	32,356
4	Corinthians	Arena Corinthians	19	595,973	31,367
5	Ceará	Castelão	19	533,482	28,078
6	Internacional	Beira-Rio	19	526,319	27,701
7	Grêmio	Arena do Grêmio	19	423,016	22,264
8	Bahia	Fonte Nova	19	366,985	19,315
9	Atletico Mineiro	Independência	19	326,363	17,177
10	Vasco da Gama	São Januário	19	282,720	14,880
11	Fluminense	Maracanã	19	274,702	14,458
12	Cruzeiro	Mineirão	19	257,146	13,534
13	Botafogo	Nilton Santos	19	219,811	11,569
14	Sport	Ilha do Retiro	19	217,132	11,428
15	Santos	Vila Belmiro	19	200,925	10,575
16	Atletico Paranaense	Arena da Baixada	19	200,830	10,570
17	Chapecoense	Arena Condá	19	178,429	9,391
18	Vitória	Barradão	19	174,439	9,181
19	Paraná	Vila Capanema	19	118,218	6,222
20	America Mineiro	Independência	19	93,043	4,897
–	Total		380	7,152,235	18,821

== Season statistics ==
=== Top scorers ===
Rank	Player	Club	Goals
1	(Brazil) Gabriel Barbosa	Santos	18
2	(Brazil) Ricardo Oliveira	Atlético Mineiro	13
3	(Brazil) Pablo	Atlético Paranaense	12
3	(Brazil) Diego Souza	São Paulo	12
5	(Brazil) Leandro Pereira	Chapecoense	11
5	(Uruguay) Nicolás López	Internacional	11
7	(Brazil) Lucas Paquetá	Flamengo	10
7	(Brazil) Yago Pikachu	Vasco da Gama	10
7	(Brazil) Leandro Damião	Internacional	10
7	(Brazil) Éverton	Grêmio	10
7	(Brazil) Pedro	Fluminense	10
7	(Brazil) Willian	Palmeiras	10

Source: Globoesporte.com

=== Assists ===
Rank	Player	Club	Assists
1	(Brazil) Dudu	Palmeiras	15
2	(Brazil) Éverton	São Paulo	8
3	(Colombia) Yimmi Chará	Atlético Mineiro	7
4	(Brazil) Luan	Grêmio	6
4	(Brazil) Everaldo	Fluminense	6
4	(Uruguay) Giorgian De Arrascaeta	Cruzeiro	6
4	(Uruguay) Nicolás López	Internacional	6
4	(Brazil) Éverton Ribeiro	Flamengo	6
4	(Brazil) Nikão	Atlético Paranaense	6
4	(Brazil) Raphael Veiga	Atlético Paranaense	6
4	(Chile) Leonardo Valencia	Botafogo	6
4	(Ecuador) Juan Cazares	Atlético Mineiro	6
4	(Argentina) Maxi López	Vasco da Gama	6
4	(Brazil) Dodô	Santos	6

Source: ESPN Deportes

=== Hat-tricks ===
Player	For	Against	Result	Date	Ref.
(Brazil) Rodrygo	Santos	Vitória	5–2	3 June 2018	
(Paraguay) Ángel Romero	Corinthians	Vasco da Gama	4–1	29 July 2018	
(Brazil) Gabriel Barbosa	Santos	Vasco da Gama	3–0	1 September 2018	

=== Clean sheets ===
Rank	Player	Club	Clean sheets
1	(Brazil) Santos	Atlético Paranaense	15
2	(Brazil) Vanderlei	Santos	14
3	(Brazil) Júlio César	Fluminense	13
3	(Brazil) Éverson	Ceará	13
5	(Brazil) Marcelo Grohe	Grêmio	12
5	(Brazil) Sidão	São Paulo	12
5	(Brazil) Weverton	Palmeiras	12
8	(Brazil) Diego Alves	Flamengo	11
8	(Brazil) Douglas Friedrich	Bahia	11
8	(Brazil) Victor	Atlético Mineiro	11

Source: FoxSports.com

== Awards ==
=== Annual awards ===
Award	Winner	Club
Manager of the Year	(Brazil) Luiz Felipe Scolari	Palmeiras
Player of the Year	(Brazil) Dudu	Palmeiras
Goal of the Year	(Brazil) Éverton Ribeiro, round 37 vs. Cruzeiro (8')	Flamengo
Fan-Selected Player of the Year	(Colombia) Gustavo Cuéllar	Flamengo
Young Player of the Year	(Brazil) Pedro	Fluminense
Fair Play Team of the Year	Corinthians	–
Referee of the Year	(Brazil) Raphael Claus	–

Source Globo
Last updated: 3 December 2018

Série A Team of the Year
Goalkeeper	(Brazil) Marcelo Lomba (Internacional)			
Defence	(Brazil) Mayke (Palmeiras)	(Argentina) Víctor Cuesta (Internacional)	(Brazil) Pedro Geromel (Grêmio)	(Brazil) Renê (Flamengo)
Midfield	(Brazil) Rodrigo Dourado (Internacional)		(Brazil) Bruno Henrique (Palmeiras)	(Brazil) Lucas Paquetá (Flamengo)
Attack	(Uruguay) Giorgian de Arrascaeta (Cruzeiro)		(Brazil) Dudu (Palmeiras)	(Brazil) Gabriel Barbosa (Santos)
