= Tharlis =

Brazilian footballer

Personal information
- Full name: Tharlis Sartori
- Date of birth: 7 January 1998 (age 28)
- Place of birth: Maravilha, Brazil
- Height: 1.81 m (5 ft 11 in)
- Position: Midfielder

Team information
- Current team: Ermionidas

Youth career
- 2015: Internacional
- 2016–2019: Chapecoense

Senior career*
| Years | Team | Apps | (Gls) |
| 2019–2022 | Chapecoense | 20 | (0) |
| 2022–2023 | Azuriz | 9 | (0) |
| 2023 | Real Ávila | | |
| 2023– | Ermionidas | | |
- * Club domestic league appearances and goals as of 15 February 2023

Tharlis Sartori (born 7 January 1998), simply known as Tharlis, is a Brazilian footballer who played as a midfielder for Greek club Ermionidas.

== Club career ==
Tharlis was born in Maravilha, Santa Catarina, and joined Chapecoense's youth setup in 2016, from Internacional. Promoted to the main squad for the 2019 season, he made his first team debut on 20 January of that year, coming on as a late substitute for Edgardo Orzuza in a 0–0 Campeonato Catarinense away draw against Metropolitano.

Tharlis made his Série A debut on 1 May 2019, starting in a 0–1 loss at Corinthians. Twenty days later, he renewed his contract until December 2021.

In April 2022, he was signed by Azuriz.

As of 2024, Tharlis is unsigned.

== Career statistics ==
As of 26 October 2021

| Club | Season | League | | | State League | | Cup | | Continental | | Other | | Total | |
| Club | Season | Division | Apps | Goals | Apps | Goals | Apps | Goals | Apps | Goals | Apps | Goals | Apps | Goals |
|---|---|---|---|---|---|---|---|---|---|---|---|---|---|---|
| Chapecoense | 2019 | Série A | 4 | 0 | 7 | 0 | 1 | 0 | — | | — | | 12 | 0 |
| Chapecoense | 2020 | Série B | 0 | 0 | 6 | 0 | 1 | 0 | — | | — | | 7 | 0 |
| Chapecoense | 2021 | Série A | 0 | 0 | 0 | 0 | 0 | 0 | — | | — | | 0 | 0 |
| Career total | | | 4 | 0 | 13 | 0 | 2 | 0 | 0 | 0 | 0 | 0 | 19 | 0 |

== Honours ==
Chapecoense

- Campeonato Catarinense: 2020
- Campeonato Brasileiro Série B: 2020
