= 1988 South American Under-16 Football Championship squads =

The 1988 South American U-16 Championship was an international association football tournament held in Ecuador. The ten national teams involved in the tournament were required to register a squad; only players in these squads were eligible to take part in the tournament.
Each player had to have been born after 1 January 1972.

== Group A ==
=== Argentina ===
Head Coach: Carlos Oscar Pachame

Assistant Coaches: Roberto Mariani, Daniel Romeo

==== Goalkeepers ====
1. Roberto Carlos Abbondancieri – Date of Birth: 19/08/1972 (Club: Rosario Central)
2. Leonardo Nicolás Díaz – Date of Birth: 05/09/1972 (Club: Newell's Old Boys)
3. Walter Adrián Sarti – Date of Birth: 02/12/1972 (Club: Olimpo de Bahía Blanca)

==== Defenders ====
1. Luis Rodolfo Piccoli – Date of Birth: 28/11/1972 (Club: Ferrocarril Oeste)
2. Carlos Homero Lizárraga – Date of Birth: 07/11/1972 (Club: Talleres de Córdoba)
3. José María Castro – Date of Birth: 22/09/1973 (Club: Vélez Sarsfield)
4. Aníbal Héctor Suárez – Date of Birth: 14/05/1973 (Club: Instituto de Córdoba)
5. Jorge Asad – Date of Birth: 26/08/1972 (Club: San Lorenzo de Almagro)
6. Diego Gastón Ordoñez – Date of Birth: 26/03/1974 (Club: Rosario Central)
7. Cristian Gonzalo García – Date of Birth: 13/04/1974 (Club: San Lorenzo de Almagro)
8. Hugo Benjamin Ibarra – Date of Birth: 01/04/1974 (Club: Club Policial de Formosa)

==== Midfielders ====
1. Gabriel Alejandro Flores – Date of Birth: 13/12/1972 (Club: San Lorenzo de Almagro)
2. Diego Cristian Castagno – Date of Birth: 10/10/1972 (Club: Newell's Old Boys)
3. Sebastián Gordon – Date of Birth: 04/11/1972 (Club: Boca Juniors)
4. Guillermo Carlos Morigi – Date of Birth: 01/03/1972 (Club: Vélez Sarsfield)
5. Pablo Andrés Michelini – Date of Birth: 07/10/1973 (Club: Deportivo Español)
6. Hugo Alberto Morales – Date of Birth: 30/07/1974 (Club: Huracán)
7. Arnaldo Ariel Ortega – Date of Birth: 04/03/1974 (Club: Club Atlético Ingenio Ledesma)
8. Eduardo Nicolás Tuzzio – Date of Birth: 31/07/1974 (Club: San Lorenzo de Almagro)

==== Forwards ====
1. Walter Javier Paz – Date of Birth: 04/03/1973 (Club: Argentinos Juniors)
2. Gabriel Osvaldo D'Ascanio – Date of Birth: 06/08/1972 (Club: Rosario Central)
3. Daniel Guillermo Laffite – Date of Birth: 03/04/1973 (Club: River Plate)
4. Eduardo Germán Coudet – Date of Birth: 12/09/1974 (Club: Platense)
5. Walter Gustavo Silvani – Date of Birth: 11/05/1971 (Club: River Plate)
6. Martín Palermo – Date of Birth: 07/11/1973 (Club: Estudiantes La Plata)
7. Fernando Andrés Pandolfi – Date of Birth: 29/05/1974 (Club: Vélez Sarsfield)

=== Colombia ===
Head Coach: (Colombia) Duilio Miranda Mari

Assistant Coaches: (Colombia) Otoniel Quintana Rojas and (Colombia) Ricardo Diaz Bernal

==== Goalkeepers ====
1. (N°1)Leonidas de la Hoz GK 30/09/1972 Atletico Junior Barranquilla (Colombia)
2. (N°12)Luis Castro GK / /19 (Colombia)
3. (N°22)Milton Patiño GK / /19 (Colombia)

==== Defenders ====
1. (N°2)Juan Diaz Rodriguez DF 23/04/1975 Corporacion Deportiva Centauros (Colombia) # (N°3)Modesto Gaibao DF 09/09/1973 Atletico Junior Barranquilla (Colombia) # (N°4)Victor Patiño DF 21/08/1972 De Leon Club de Futbol (Colombia)
2. (N°6)Oscar Cañate DF / /19 (Colombia)
3. (N°13)Jorge Duque DF / /19 (Colombia)
4. (N°15)Douglas Molina DF / /19 (Colombia)
5. (N°17)Arley Dinas DF / /19 (Colombia)
6. (N°19)Luis Leon DF / /19 (Colombia)
7. (N°24)Carlos Moreno DF / /19 (Colombia)

(N°5)Oswaldo Bravo MF 16/07/1972 (Colombia) (N°7)John Harold Lozano MF //19 (Colombia) (N°8)Alfredo Nieto MF 20/06/1974 Atletico Nacional Medellin (Colombia) (N°10)Williams Fiorillo MF / /19 (Colombia) (N°14)Henry Zambrano MF / /19 (Colombia) (N°18)Jose Antonio Marupia MF / /19 (Colombia) *(N°21)Edinson Chavez MF / /19 (Colombia) *(N°23)Alfredo Nieto MF / /19 (Colombia)

- (N°26)Victor Pacheco MF / /19 (Colombia)

==== Forwards ====
1. (N°9)Oswaldo Mackenzie FW 19/01/1973 La Fortuna Football Club (Colombia)
2. (N°11)Enrique Braidy Requiniva FW 15/01/1973 S Meta (Colombia)
3. (N°16)Carlos Moreno Ortiz FW / /19 (Colombia)
4. (N°20)Hector Zapata FW / /19 (Colombia)
5. (N°25)Victor Hugo Aristizabal FW / /19 (Colombia)

=== Uruguay ===
Head coach: (Uruguay) Isabelino Barrios A.T. (Uruguay) Julio Cesar Cortes and (Uruguay) Pablo Justo Forlan

No.	Pos.	Player	Date of birth (age)	Club
17	FW	Diego Bresciani		(Uruguayan Football Association) River Plate
6	DF	Diego Eiroa		(Uruguayan Football Association) River Plate
10	MF	Mario Peñalba		(Uruguayan Football Association) Club Nacional de Football
16	DF	Lester Marcelo Berrospe		(Uruguayan Football Association) CA Cerro
14	MF	Elbio Tolosa		(Uruguayan Football Association) Rampla Juniors
9	FW	Luis Alberto Álvarez		(Uruguayan Football Association) Peñarol
15	MF	Marcos Marcelo Tejera	6 August 1973 (aged 14)	(Uruguayan Football Association) Defensor Sporting
18	DF	Gustavo Rehermann Armesto		(Uruguayan Football Association) Peñarol
13	FW	Marcelo González		(Uruguayan Football Association) Peñarol
3	FW	Osvaldo Francisco Canobbio	17 February 1973 (aged 15)	(Uruguayan Football Association) River Plate (Montevideo)
1	GK	Carlos Nicola	3 January 1973 (aged 15)	(Uruguayan Football Association) Nacional
5	MF	Wilmar Arbelo		(Uruguayan Football Association) Nacional
11	FW	Maximiliano Olivera		(Uruguayan Football Association) Nacional
8	MF	Rodrigo Lemos	3 August 1973 (aged 15)	(Uruguayan Football Association) Club Nacional de Football
4	DF	Carlos Barboza		(Uruguayan Football Association) Nacional
2	DF	Ricardo Larrama		(Uruguayan Football Association) Peñarol
7	FW	Marcelo Antonio Da Rosa		(Uruguayan Football Association) Club Atlético Bella Vista
12	GK	Ignacio Dorta		(Uruguayan Football Association) Central Español

- (N°7)Marcelo Antonio Da Rosa FW 06/08/1972 Club Atletico Bella Vista (Uruguay)
- (N°8)Rodrigo Javier Lemos MF 03/10/1973 Club Nacional de Football (Uruguay)
- (N°10)Mario Peñalba MF 20/08/1972 Club Nacional de Football (Uruguay)
- (N°14)Elbio Tolosa MF 18/01/1973 Rampla Juniors Futbol Club (Uruguay)
- (N°18)Gustavo Reherman Armesto DF 20/08/1972 Club Atletico Peñarol (Uruguay)
- (N°19) *(N°20) *(N°21) *(N°22) *(N°23) *(N°24) *(N°25) *(N°26)

=== Peru ===
Head Coach: Angel Eloy Campos Assistant Coaches: Francisco Busto, Antonio Orellana

==== Goalkeepers ====
1. Carlos Enrique Quiroz – Date of Birth: 05/05/1972 (Club: Universitario)
2. Roberto Martínez – Date of Birth: 08/02/1972 (Club: Alianza Lima)
3. Felipe Vargas – Date of Birth: 10/08/1973 (Club: Sporting Cristal)

==== Defenders ====
1. Carlos Zambrano – Date of Birth: 12/11/1973 (Club: Universitario)
2. Edwin Soria – Date of Birth: 22/03/1972 (Club: Alianza Lima)
3. Víctor Herrera – Date of Birth: 18/07/1973 (Club: Sporting Cristal)
4. Luis Alberto Ochoa – Date of Birth: 04/06/1972 (Club: Universitario)
5. Joaquín López – Date of Birth: 29/01/1973 (Club: Sporting Cristal)
6. Fernando Paredes – Date of Birth: 18/08/1973 (Club: Universitario)

==== Midfielders ====
1. Gustavo Ayala – Date of Birth: 01/03/1972 (Club: Alianza Lima)
2. Eduardo Núñez – Date of Birth: 25/07/1972 (Club: Universitario)
3. Juan José González – Date of Birth: 12/10/1973 (Club: Sporting Cristal)
4. Rodolfo García – Date of Birth: 02/04/1973 (Club: Universitario)
5. Carlos Rodríguez – Date of Birth: 04/06/1972 (Club: Alianza Lima)
6. César Vázquez – Date of Birth: 07/09/1973 (Club: Universitario)

==== Forwards ====
1. Fernando Morales – Date of Birth: 03/12/1972 (Club: Universitario)
2. Luis Vilchez – Date of Birth: 10/11/1973 (Club: Sporting Cristal)
3. Carlos Cáceda – Date of Birth: 11/09/1973 (Club: Alianza Lima)
4. Pedro León – Date of Birth: 13/06/1972 (Club: Universitario)
5. Carlos Castillo – Date of Birth: 05/01/1973 (Club: Alianza Lima)

=== Bolivia ===
Head Coach: Horacio Ballesteros

Assistant Coaches: Jorge Sossa, Rolando Vargas

==== Goalkeepers ====
1. Carlos Sánchez – Date of Birth: 15/01/1972 (Club: The Strongest)
2. Rubén Díaz – Date of Birth: 11/07/1972 (Club: Bolívar)
3. René Moya – Date of Birth: 22/09/1973 (Club: Oriente Petrolero)

==== Defenders ====
1. Carlos Jara – Date of Birth: 29/05/1973 (Club: The Strongest)
2. Luis Cristaldo – Date of Birth: 19/04/1972 (Club: Bolívar)
3. Ramiro Martínez – Date of Birth: 23/11/1973 (Club: The Strongest)
4. Jorge Coelho – Date of Birth: 12/12/1972 (Club: Bolívar)
5. Luis Alberto Díaz – Date of Birth: 04/05/1973 (Club: Oriente Petrolero)
6. Oscar Martínez – Date of Birth: 30/06/1973 (Club: San José)

==== Midfielders ====
1. Adrián Guzmán – Date of Birth: 02/03/1972 (Club: Bolívar)
2. Carlos Morales – Date of Birth: 10/09/1973 (Club: The Strongest)
3. Fernando Ibarra – Date of Birth: 06/04/1973 (Club: Oriente Petrolero)
4. Eloy Romero – Date of Birth: 29/03/1973 (Club: San José)
5. Carlos López – Date of Birth: 15/06/1972 (Club: Bolívar)
6. Luis López – Date of Birth: 25/02/1973 (Club: Oriente Petrolero)

==== Forwards ====
1. Carlos Vargas – Date of Birth: 22/07/1972 (Club: The Strongest)
2. Juan Carlos Ríos – Date of Birth: 17/05/1973 (Club: San José)
3. Efrén Quinteros – Date of Birth: 11/12/1973 (Club: Bolívar)
4. José Luis Sánchez – Date of Birth: 05/03/1972 (Club: Oriente Petrolero)
5. Juan Pérez – Date of Birth: 30/08/1972 (Club: San José)

== Group B ==
=== Brazil ===
Head Coach: Jomar da Silva Assistant Coaches: Ricardo Gomes, Elenilson Santos

==== Goalkeepers ====
1. Helbert Paghetti or Paghete Mussi – Date of Birth: 25/09/1972 (Club: XV de Jau Brazil)
2. Jorcey Anisio Garcia Santos – Date of Birth: 24/10/1972 (Club: Flamengo CR Brazil)

==== Defenders ====
1. Anderson Lima Veiga – Date of Birth: 18/03/1973 (Club:Juventus São Paulo Brazil)
2. Alessandro Cristiano Vittorim Lica – Date of Birth: 20/04/1973 (Club:Internacional Porto Alegre Brazil)
3. Andrei Frascarelli – Date of Birth: 21/02/1973 (Club:XV de Jau Brazil)
4. Admilson Pereira Veloso Biro – Date of Birth: 04/11/1973 (Club: São Paulo (Brazil)

==== Midfielders ====
1. Carlos Augusto Teixeira e Silva – Date of Birth: 01/08/1972 (Club: Atletico Mineiro Brazil)
2. Moises Nascimento de Jesus – Date of Birth: 10/01/1973 (Club: Vasco da Gama Brazil)
3. Gilmar Ferreira – Date of Birth: 25/11/1972 (Club: Atletico Mineiro Brazil)
4. Cleber dos Santos – Date of Birth: 09/10/1972 (Club: Bahia Esporte Club Brazil)
5. Luciano Gama – Date of Birth: 22/07/1972 (Club: Guarani Futebol Clube)
6. Antonio Marcos – Date of Birth: Unknown

==== Forwards ====
1. Marcio Gomes Sampaio – Date of Birth: 16/03/1973 (Club: São Paulo Brazil)
2. Adriano Gerlin da Silva Mildfelder – Date of Birth: 20/09/1974 (Club: Guarani Esporte Clube Brazil)

=== Paraguay ===
Head Coach: José Luis Rodríguez

Assistant Coaches: José Fernández, Armando Urueta

==== Goalkeepers ====
1. Carlos Gustavo Orué – Date of Birth: 16/07/1972 (Club: Olimpia)
2. Juan Carlos Barreto – Date of Birth: 08/02/1972 (Club: Cerro Porteño)
3. Héctor González – Date of Birth: 22/09/1973 (Club: Guarani)

==== Defenders ====
1. Carlos Chamorro – Date of Birth: 29/01/1973 (Club: Olimpia)
2. Carlos Rodríguez – Date of Birth: 14/06/1972 (Club: Cerro Porteño)
3. Juan Díaz – Date of Birth: 25/05/1973 (Club: Olimpia)
4. José Luis González – Date of Birth: 21/10/1972 (Club: Guarani)
5. Fernando Vargas – Date of Birth: 07/11/1973 (Club: Cerro Porteño)
6. Víctor Barrientos – Date of Birth: 10/03/1973 (Club: Olimpia)

==== Midfielders ====
1. Héctor Alvarenga – Date of Birth: 20/02/1973 (Club: Cerro Porteño)
2. Juan Carlos Enciso – Date of Birth: 15/01/1972 (Club: Olimpia)
3. Juan Benítez – Date of Birth: 03/04/1973 (Club: Guarani)
4. Luis Enrique Fernández – Date of Birth: 19/05/1972 (Club: Cerro Porteño)
5. Carlos Antonio Silva – Date of Birth: 07/09/1973 (Club: Olimpia)
6. Carlos Enrique Rodríguez – Date of Birth: 12/06/1973 (Club: Cerro Porteño)

==== Forwards ====
1. Carlos Pérez – Date of Birth: 22/07/1973 (Club: Olimpia)
2. Antonio Vargas – Date of Birth: 16/12/1972 (Club: Cerro Porteño)
3. Juan Manuel Arrúa – Date of Birth: 11/04/1973 (Club: Guarani)
4. Héctor Martínez – Date of Birth: 02/11/1973 (Club: Olimpia)
5. Luis Gómez – Date of Birth: 20/03/1972 (Club: Cerro Porteño)

=== Chile ===
Head Coach: Luis Enrique Fernández

Assistant Coaches: Andrés Gamboa, Francisco Valdés

==== Goalkeepers ====
1. Carlos Véliz – Date of Birth: 09/03/1972 (Club: Universidad de Chile)
2. Claudio Pérez – Date of Birth: 18/05/1972 (Club: Universidad Católica)
3. Eduardo Etcheverry – Date of Birth: 23/09/1973 (Club: Santiago Morning)

==== Defenders ====
1. Juan Carlos Gaete – Date of Birth: 04/01/1973 (Club: Universidad de Chile)
2. Héctor Tapia – Date of Birth: 17/02/1972 (Club: Universidad de Chile)
3. Luis Pérez – Date of Birth: 22/06/1972 (Club: Universidad de Chile)
4. Felipe Flores – Date of Birth: 21/05/1973 (Club: Universidad de Chile)
5. Víctor Díaz – Date of Birth: 10/11/1972 (Club: Universidad Católica)
6. Carlos Silva – Date of Birth: 26/02/1973 (Club: Universidad de Chile)

==== Midfielders ====
1. Jaime Valdés – Date of Birth: 02/09/1972 (Club: Colo-Colo)
2. Claudio Pérez – Date of Birth: 15/04/1973 (Club: Universidad de Chile)
3. Francisco Valdés – Date of Birth: 25/08/1973 (Club: Universidad Católica)
4. Joaquín Díaz – Date of Birth: 14/02/1973 (Club: Universidad de Chile)
5. Carlos Torres – Date of Birth: 23/09/1973 (Club: Universidad de Chile)
6. Jorge González – Date of Birth: 18/11/1973 (Club: Universidad de Chile)

==== Forwards ====
1. Eduardo Hara – Date of Birth: 14/06/1972 (Club: Universidad de Chile)
2. Carlos Vargas – Date of Birth: 22/03/1972 (Club: Universidad de Chile)
3. Rodrigo Ruiz – Date of Birth: 03/11/1972 (Club: Universidad Católica)
4. Carlos Garrido – Date of Birth: 12/05/1973 (Club: Universidad de Chile)

=== Ecuador ===
Head Coach: Juan José Govea

Assistant Coaches: Carlos Franco, Edgar Solano

==== Goalkeepers ====
1. Carlos Alfredo Ochoa – Date of Birth: 07/12/1972 (Club: Liga Deportiva Universitaria)
2. Luis Enrique González – Date of Birth: 04/03/1973 (Club: Barcelona SC)
3. Eduardo Díaz – Date of Birth: 21/08/1973 (Club: El Nacional)

==== Defenders ====
1. Jorge Pineda – Date of Birth: 14/05/1972 (Club: Liga Deportiva Universitaria)
2. Carlos César Rivas – Date of Birth: 23/06/1973 (Club: Barcelona SC)
3. Fernando Andrade – Date of Birth: 18/10/1972 (Club: El Nacional)
4. Javier Guerrero – Date of Birth: 02/09/1973 (Club: Liga Deportiva Universitaria)
5. Luis Bravo – Date of Birth: 05/02/1973 (Club: Barcelona SC)
6. José Martínez – Date of Birth: 30/11/1973 (Club: El Nacional)

==== Midfielders ====
1. Carlos Vargas – Date of Birth: 20/07/1972 (Club: Liga Deportiva Universitaria)
2. Carlos Hidalgo – Date of Birth: 02/05/1972 (Club: Barcelona SC)
3. Fernando González – Date of Birth: 04/03/1973 (Club: El Nacional)
4. Luis Suárez – Date of Birth: 12/06/1973 (Club: Liga Deportiva Universitaria)
5. Pedro García – Date of Birth: 18/02/1972 (Club: Barcelona SC)
6. Ricardo López – Date of Birth: 23/07/1973 (Club: El Nacional)

==== Forwards ====
1. Felipe Rodríguez – Date of Birth: 05/12/1972 (Club: Liga Deportiva Universitaria)
2. Carlos Velez – Date of Birth: 12/01/1973 (Club: Barcelona SC)
3. Juan Francisco Gómez – Date of Birth: 22/08/1973 (Club: El Nacional)
4. Luis González – Date of Birth: 28/10/1972 (Club: Barcelona SC)
5. Guillermo Díaz – Date of Birth: 17/06/1973 (Club: Liga Deportiva Universitaria)

=== Venezuela ===
Head Coach: (Venezuela) Antonio Cabrujas A.T. (Venezuela) Jorge Perez and (Venezuela) Miguel Parella.

No.	Pos.	Player	Date of birth (age)	Caps	Goals	Club
		Rafael Dudamel	January 7, 1973 (aged 15)			(Venezuelan Football Federation) Sin datos
		Konrad Majster	April 9, 1973 (aged 15)			(Venezuelan Football Federation) Sin datos
		Cosme Justo Bocassini	October 7, 1973 (aged 15)			(Venezuelan Football Federation) Sin datos
		Roger Patricio Dávila	Sin datos			(Venezuelan Football Federation) Sin datos
		Leonardo Enrique Lupi	October 2, 1972 (aged 16)			(Venezuelan Football Federation) Sin datos
		Carlos Julio Patrizzi	Sin datos			(Venezuelan Football Federation) Sin datos
		Rodrigo Juan Reyes	Sin datos			(Venezuelan Football Federation) Sin datos
		Miklós Vidal	September 24, 1973 (aged 15)			(Venezuelan Football Federation) Sin datos
		Jesús Daniel Vita	September 4, 1972 (aged 16)			(Venezuelan Football Federation) Sin datos
		Enrique Héctor Castro	Sin datos			(Venezuelan Football Federation) Sin datos
		Carlos Alberto Contreras	August 17, 1972 (aged 16)			(Venezuelan Football Federation) Sin datos
		Andrés Javier Danesi	Sin datos			(Venezuelan Football Federation) Sin datos
		Fernando Horacio Misfut	Sin datos			(Venezuelan Football Federation) Sin datos
		Paul Alexander Pellicani	Sin datos			(Venezuelan Football Federation) Sin datos
		Andrés Jesús Bermúdez	Sin datos			(Venezuelan Football Federation) Sin datos
		Luigi Benito D'Antuono	Sin datos			(Venezuelan Football Federation) Sin datos
		Alberto Andrés Mosquera	Sin datos			(Venezuelan Football Federation) Sin datos
		Luis Enrique Vargas	Sin datos			(Venezuelan Football Federation) Sin datos
