= Danlaba Mendy =

French footballer (born 1976)

Danlaba
Personal information
- Full name: Danlaba Mendy
- Date of birth: 20 February 1976 (age 50)
- Place of birth: Trappes, France
- Height: 1.86 m (6 ft 1 in)
- Position: Attacking midfielder

Youth career
- 1994–1998: IMG Academies

Senior career*
Years	Team	Apps	(Gls)
1998–1999	Grêmio FBPA	14	(1)
1999–2003	Troyes AC	19	(2)
- * Club domestic league appearances and goals

Danlaba Mendy (born 20 February 1976) is a French former football striker He played for Grêmio FBPA in the Brazilian Championship and the Copa Mercosur in 1998, after which he spent four seasons with Troyes AC in the French Ligue 1.

Born in Trappes, Danlaba moved with his family to the United States as a child. He played youth football at the IMG Academy, and then had an internship at Brazilian club Grêmio. Due to Grêmio's lack of available players, Danlaba was used in a 1998 Campeonato Gaúcho match. He would make a few more league appearances for the club, but never signed a full contract.
