= Maravilha, Santa Catarina =

Coordinates: 26°46′12″S 53°13′00″W

- Municipality
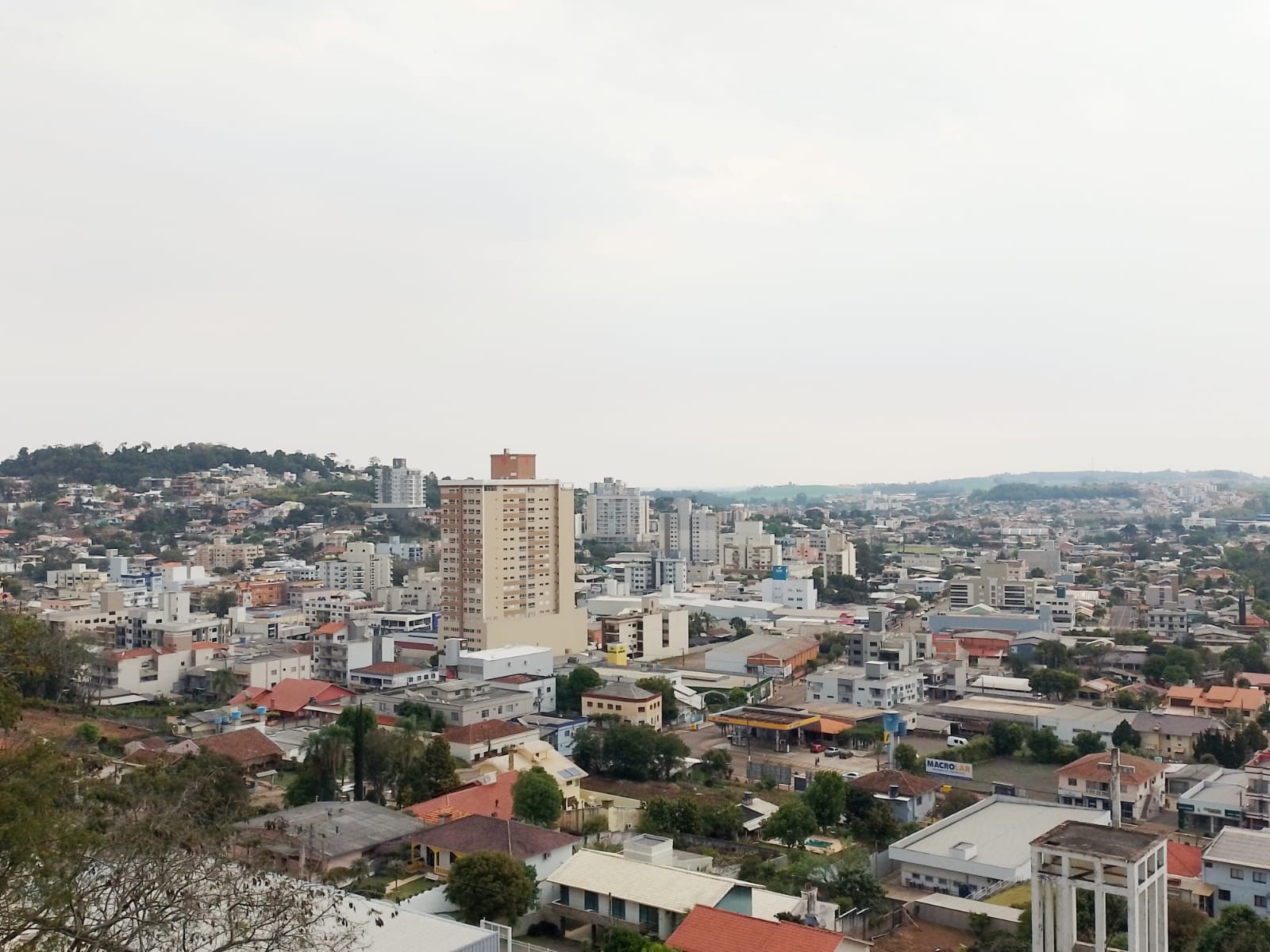

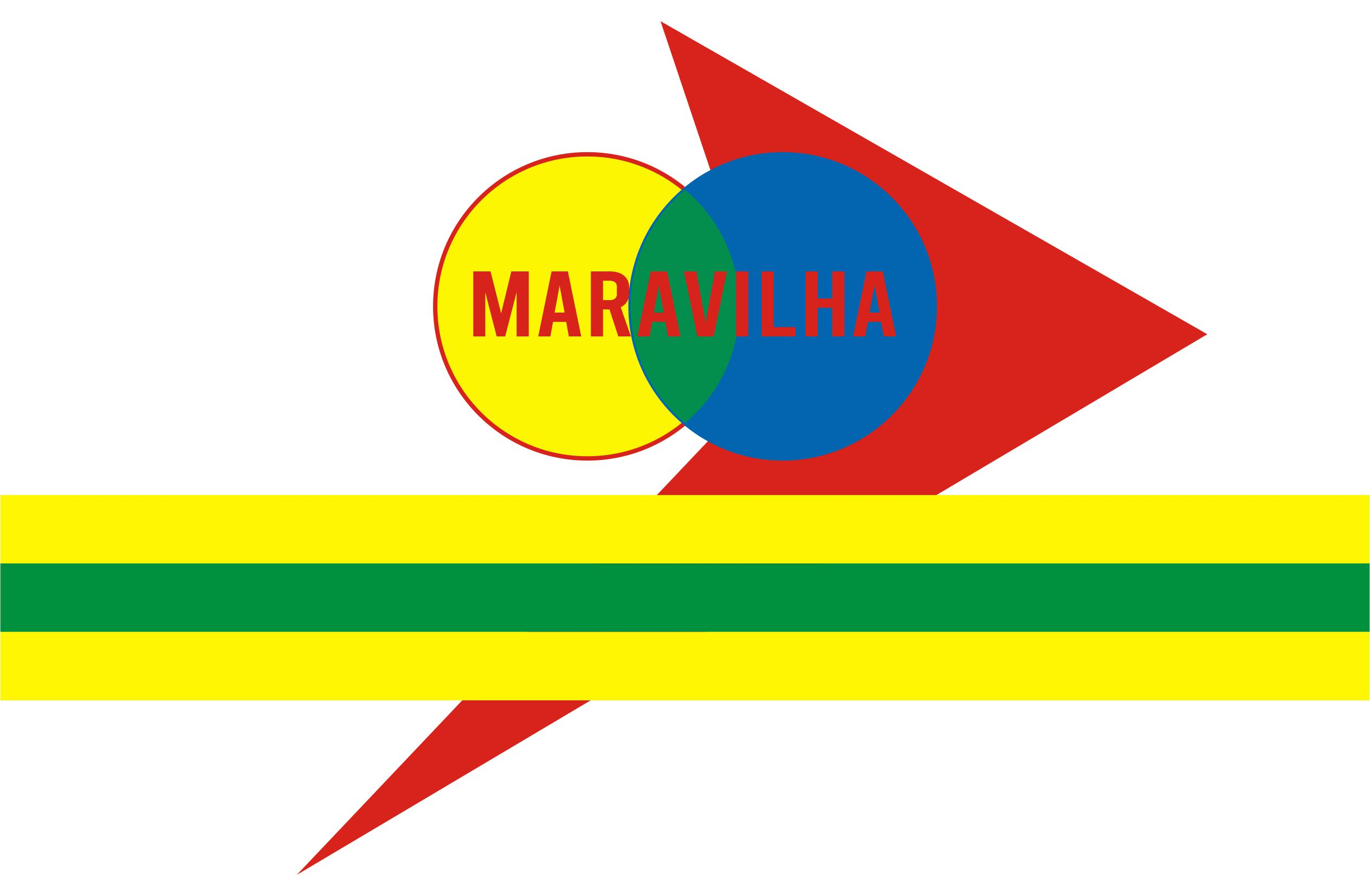
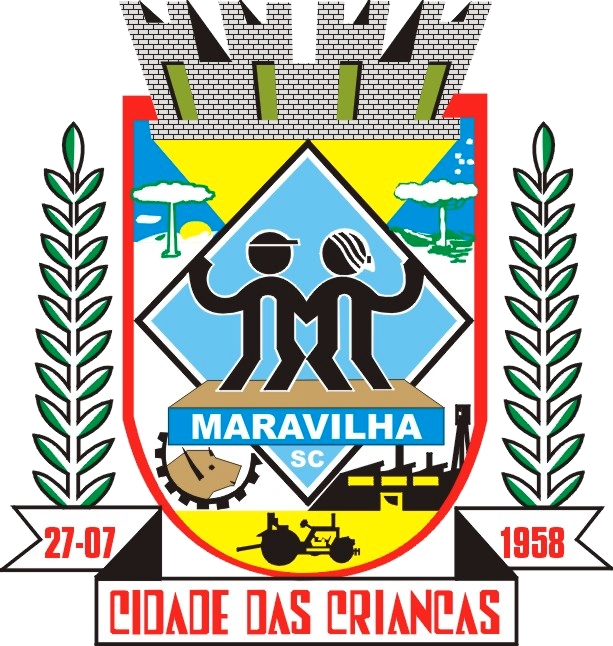
- Flag Coat of arms
- Interactive map of Maravilha, Santa Catarina
- Country: Brazil
- Region: South
- State: Santa Catarina
- Mesoregion: Oeste Catarinense

Population (2020)
  - Total: 26,116
- Time zone: UTC -3

Maravilha, Santa Catarina is a municipality in the state of Santa Catarina in the South region of Brazil. It was created in 1958 out of the existing municipality of Palmitos.

== See also ==
- List of municipalities in Santa Catarina
