= Benji Nzeakor =

Nigerian footballer

Personal information
- Full name: Benjamin Nzeakor
- Date of birth: 16 April 1964 (age 62)
- Place of birth: Port Harcourt, Nigeria
- Position: Forward

Senior career*
Years	Team	Apps	(Gls)
–	Sharks F.C.		
–	Stationery Stores F.C.		
–	National		
1988–1990	Vitória		
1992	Deportivo Municipal		
1993–1996	América-RJ		

International career
1984–1985	Nigeria		
- * Club domestic league appearances and goals

Benji Nzeakor (born 16 April 1964) is a retired Nigerian football forward.

Nzeakor began playing club football in Nigeria, spending time with Sharks F.C., Stationery Stores F.C. and National. In 1988, he moved to Brazil where he played for Esporte Clube Vitória in the Campeonato Brasileiro. He became the first African footballer to play in Peru, joining Deportivo Municipal in 1992. He stayed just one season after suffering a knee injury.

Nzeakor made several appearances for the Nigeria national football team in the 1980s, including two FIFA World Cup qualifying matches.

He retired from playing football in 1996, and went on to become a FIFA-licensed players' agent based in Brazil.
