= Martín Taborda =

Uruguayan footballer

Personal information
- Full name: Martín Artigas Taborda Olivera
- Date of birth: 14 April 1956 (age 70)
- Place of birth: San José de Mayo, Uruguay
- Position: Defender

Youth career
- Selección San José
- 1971–1973: Río Negro
- 1974–1975: Nacional

Senior career*
Years	Team	Apps	(Gls)
1975–1978	Nacional	40	(5)
1978–1982	Corinthians	40	(2)
1980	→ Coritiba (loan)	3	(0)
1980	→ Sport Recife (loan)		
1982–1984	Portuguesa		
1983	→ Juventude (loan)		
1984	River Plate		
1985	Nacional	2	(0)
1986	Central Español		
1987	Rentistas		
1988–1989	Deportes La Serena	16	(2)
1990	Río Negro		

International career
1977	Uruguay	2	(0)

Managerial career
- 1999: Bella Vista (assistant)
- 2000: Defensor Sporting (assistant)
- 2003: Danubio (assistant)
- Río Negro
- * Club domestic league appearances and goals

Martín Artigas Taborda Olivera (born 14 April 1956) is a former Uruguayan footballer who played as a defender. Besides Uruguay, he played for clubs in Brazil, Argentina and Chile.

== Club career ==
- (Uruguay) Selección San José (youth)
- (Uruguay) Río Negro (youth)
- (Uruguay) Nacional (youth)
- (Uruguay) Nacional 1975–1978
- (Brazil) Corinthians 1978–1979
- (Brazil) Coritiba 1980
- (Brazil) Sport Recife 1981
- (Brazil) Corinthians 1981–1982
- (Brazil) Portuguesa 1982
- (Brazil) Juventude 1983
- (Brazil) Portuguesa 1984
- (Argentina) River Plate 1984
- (Uruguay) Nacional 1985
- (Uruguay) Central Español 1986
- (Uruguay) Rentistas 1987
- (Chile) Deportes La Serena 1988–1989
- (Uruguay) Río Negro 1990

== International career ==
- Uruguay 1977
