= Alex Kamianecky =

Brazilian footballer (born 1945)

Personal information
- Full name: Alexander Kamianecky
- Date of birth: 9 December 1945 (age 80)
- Place of birth: Hamburg, Germany
- Position: Defender

Senior career*
Years	Team	Apps	(Gls)
1965–1966	Aimoré		
1967–1979	America-RJ		
1979–1980	Sport		
1980	América-RN		
1981	Moto Club		
1982	São Cristóvão		
- * Club domestic league appearances and goals

Alexander Kamianecky (born 9 December 1945) is a Brazilian former footballer who played as a defender.

== Early life ==
Kamianecky was born in Hamburg, Germany to Ukrainian refugees. In 1947, when he was two years old, the family emigrated to Brazil.

== Club career ==
Kamianecky was nicknamed the "Champion of Fair Play" for never injuring an opposing player, and was awarded the Prêmio Belfort Duarte for going ten years without receiving a red card. He spent twelve years with Brazilian side America-RJ. In 1979, he signed for Brazilian side Sport, with a clause in his contract that stated he could choose not to play against his former club, America-RJ. He is honored on the Maracanã Walk of Fame.

== International career ==
In 1973, Kamianecky represented a World XI against the Brazil national team.
