= Carlos Nicola =

Uruguayan footballer (born 1973)

Personal information
- Full name: Carlos Daniel Nicola Jaumandreu
- Date of birth: 3 January 1973 (age 53)
- Place of birth: Montevideo, Uruguay
- Height: 1.88 m (6 ft 2 in)
- Position: Goalkeeper

Team information
- Current team: Cruz Azul (goalkeeping coach)

Senior career*
Years	Team	Apps	(Gls)
1995–1997	Nacional	48	(0)
1998	San Lorenzo	1	(0)
1999	Nacional	6	(0)
2000–2001	Atlético-PR	1	(0)
2001	Independiente Medellín	19	(0)
2002–2004	Deportivo Maldonado	82	(0)
2004–2005	Municipal		
2006	Bella Vista	16	(0)
2006–2007	Liverpool de Montevideo	28	(0)

International career
1996–1997	Uruguay	4	(0)
- * Club domestic league appearances and goals

Carlos Daniel Nicola Jaumandreu (born 3 January 1973) is a Uruguayan former footballer. He is the current goalkeeping coach of Liga MX club Cruz Azul.

== Club career ==
Nicola had brief spells with San Lorenzo in the Primera División de Argentina and with Atlético-PR in the Campeonato Brasileiro Série A.

== International career ==
Nicola made four appearances for the senior Uruguay national football team between 1996 and 1997, including one match at the 1997 FIFA Confederations Cup.
