= Marcelo Báez =

Paraguayan footballer (born 1991)

Personal information
- Full name: Marcelo David Báez Casco
- Date of birth: 14 January 1991 (age 35)
- Place of birth: Ciudad del Este, Paraguay
- Height: 1.78 m (5 ft 10 in)
- Position: Left back

Team information
- Current team: Guaireña
- Number: 22

Senior career*
Years	Team	Apps	(Gls)
2014	3 de Febrero	19	(0)
2015	Sportivo Luqueño	35	(1)
2016	Libertad	24	(1)
2017	Guaraní	7	(0)
2018	Paraná	3	(0)
2019	Sportivo Luqueño	30	(0)
2020–	Guaireña	7	(0)
- * Club domestic league appearances and goals as of 19:27, 26 July 2020 (UTC)

Marcelo David Báez Casco (born 14 January 1991), known as Marcelo Báez, is a Paraguayan footballer who plays as a defender for Guaireña.
