= Edgardo Orzusa =

Paraguayan footballer (born 1990)

Personal information
- Full name: Edgardo Daniel Orzusa Cáceres
- Date of birth: 22 June 1990 (age 36)
- Place of birth: Paraguarí, Paraguay
- Height: 1.73 m (5 ft 8 in)
- Position: Midfielder

Team information
- Current team: Olimpia
- Number: 22

Senior career*
Years	Team	Apps	(Gls)
2011–2015	Sol de América	181	(9)
2016–2021	Nacional	146	(9)
2018–2019	→ Chapecoense (loan)	9	(0)
2021–2022	Olimpia	17	(0)
2023–2024	Nacional	44	(0)
2024–	Sportivo Trinidense	5	(0)

International career
2012	Paraguay	2	(0)
- * Club domestic league appearances and goals as of 21 September 2024

Edgardo Daniel Orzusa Cáceres (born 22 June 1990) is a Paraguayan professional footballer who plays as a midfielder for Sportivo Trinidense.

== Career ==
Born in Paraguarí, Orzuza has played club football for Sol de América and Club Nacional.

He made his international debut for Paraguay in 2012.
