= 2024 Club Athletico Paranaense season =

Club Athletico Paranaense
2024 season
- Manager: Juan Carlos Osorio (until 3 March); Cuca (from 4 March to 24 June); Juca Antonello (interim, from 24 June to 8 July); Martín Varini (from 9 July to 23 September); Lucho González (from 24 September)
- Stadium: Arena da Baixada
- Série A: 17th
- Campeonato Paranaense: Winners
- Copa do Brasil: Quarter-finals
- Copa Sudamericana: Quarter-finals
- Top goalscorer: League: Agustín Canobbio; Gonzalo Mastriani (4 each); All: Gonzalo Mastriani (16)
- Average home league attendance: 29,405
Home colours	Away colours	Third colours

The 2024 season is the 101st season in the history of Club Athletico Paranaense and the twelfth consecutive season in the top division. The club participated in the Brazilian Série A, the Copa do Brasil, the Copa Sudamericana and the Campeonato Paranaense, the top tier of Parana's state football.

The club suffered relegation after finishing 18th in the league, ending a 12-year run in the top tier of Brazilian football. However, they won the state league with a 4-0 aggregate victory over Maringa in the finals.

== Competitions ==
=== Overview ===
Competition	First match	Last match	Starting round	Final position	Record							
Competition	First match	Last match	Starting round	Final position	Pld	W	D	L	GF	GA	GD	Win %
Série A	14 April 2024	8 December 2024	Matchday 1	17th	38	11	9	18	40	46	−6	28.95
Campeonato Paranaense	17 January 2024	6 April 2024	Matchday 1	Winners	17	12	4	1	30	7	+23	70.59
Copa do Brasil	1 May 2024	12 September 2024	Third Round	Quarter-finals	6	4	0	2	12	7	+5	66.67
Copa Sudamericana	2 April 2024	26 September 2024	Group Stage	Quarter-finals	12	8	1	3	26	12	+14	66.67
Total					73	35	14	24	108	72	+36	47.95

Last updated: 06 January 2025
Source: Soccerway

=== Campeonato Paranaense ===
==== First stage ====
Pos	Team	Pld	W	D	L	GF	GA	GD	Pts	Qualification or relegation
1	Athletico Paranaense	11	7	4	0	17	5	+12	25	Advance to Quarter-finals
2	Coritiba	11	6	3	2	22	11	+11	21	Advance to Quarter-finals
3	Maringá	11	5	5	1	18	11	+7	20	Advance to Quarter-finals
4	Operário Ferroviário	11	5	3	3	11	8	+3	18	Advance to Quarter-finals
5	Azuriz	11	5	2	4	12	12	0	17	Advance to Quarter-finals
6	FC Cascavel	11	4	4	3	10	9	+1	16	Advance to Quarter-finals
7	Cianorte	11	4	2	5	12	13	−1	14	Advance to Quarter-finals
8	Londrina	11	3	5	3	17	14	+3	14	Advance to Quarter-finals
9	Andraus	11	3	2	6	6	16	−10	11	
10	São Joseense	11	2	2	7	8	14	−6	8	
11	PSTC (R)	11	2	2	7	9	20	−11	8	Relegation to 2025 Second Division
12	Galo Maringá (R)	11	1	4	6	13	22	−9	7	Relegation to 2025 Second Division

Source: FPF
(R) Relegated

==== Matches ====
The match schedule was released on 20 November 2023.

Win Draw Loss

17 January 2024 1	Andraus	0–2	Athletico Paranaense	Curitiba, Paraná
16:00 BRT (UTC−3)				Stadium: Durival Britto e Silva

21 January 2024 2	Azuriz	0–0	Athletico Paranaense	Pato Branco, Paraná
16:00 BRT (UTC−3)				Stadium: Os Pioneiros

24 January 2024 3	Athletico Paranaense	1–1	Maringá	Curitiba, Paraná
19:00 BRT (UTC−3)				Stadium: Ligga Arena

27 January 2024 4	Athletico Paranaense	2–1	Galo Maringá	Curitiba, Paraná
18:30 BRT (UTC−3)				Stadium: Ligga Arena

31 January 2024 5	Cianorte	0–1	Athletico Paranaense	Cianorte, Paraná
20:00 BRT (UTC−3)				Stadium: Estádio Olimpico Albino Turbay

3 February 2024 6	Athletico Paranaense	4–0	PSTC	Curitiba, Paraná
18:30 BRT (UTC−3)				Stadium: Ligga Arena

7 February 2024 7	Athletico Paranaense	1–0	FC Cascavel	Curitiba, Paraná
20:30 BRT (UTC−3)				Stadium: Ligga Arena

10 February 2024 8	Londrina	1–2	Athletico Paranaense	Londrina, Paraná
16:00 BRT (UTC−3)				Stadium: Estádio do Café

15 February 2024 9	Athletico Paranaense	0–0	Operário Ferroviário	Curitiba, Paraná
19:00 BRT (UTC−3)				Stadium: Ligga Arena

18 February 2024 10	Coritiba	1–1	Athletico Paranaense	Curitiba, Paraná
18:30 BRT (UTC−3)				Stadium: Couto Pereira

25 February 2024 11	Athletico Paranaense	3–1	São Joseense	Curitiba, Paraná
16:00 BRT (UTC−3)				Stadium: Ligga Arena

==== Quarter Finals ====
2 March 2024 First leg	Londrina	1–0	Athletico Paranaense	Londrina, Paraná
16:00 UTC−3		Report		Stadium: Estádio do Café

10 March 2024 Second leg	Athletico Paranaense	6–0 (6–1 agg.)	Londrina	Curitiba, Paraná
18:30 UTC−3		Report		Stadium: Ligga Arena

==== Semi Finals ====
16 March 2024 First leg	Operário Ferroviário	1–2	Athletico Paranaense	Ponta Grossa, Paraná
16:00 UTC−3		Report		Stadium: Germano Krüger

27 March 2024 Second leg	Athletico Paranaense	1–0 (3–2 agg.)	Operário Ferroviário	Curitiba, Paraná
20:00 UTC−3		Report		Stadium: Ligga Arena

==== Final ====
30 March 2024 First leg	Maringá	0–1	Athletico Paranaense	Ponta Grossa, Paraná
17:00 UTC−3		Report		Stadium: Germano Krüger

6 April 2024 Second leg	Athletico Paranaense	3–0 (4–0 agg.)	Maringá	Curitiba, Paraná
17:00 UTC−3		Report		Stadium: Ligga Arena

=== Série A ===
The 2024 Brasileirão fixtures were released on 29 February 2024. The league season began with a home win against Cuiabá on 14 April. Pablo scored Athletico's first goal in the tournament at 22 minutes of the first half. This was followed by goals from Canobbio at the 36th minute and Leo Godoy at the 38th minute of the first half, and Mastriani at the 35th minute of the second half. Coach Cuca trained the team until the 11th round, when he requested to leave his position as manager, leaving the team with 6 wins, 4 draws, and 2 losses in the tournament. The team was temporarily managed by assistant coach Juca Antonello from rounds 12 to 16. During this period, Athletico defeated Vitória and Atlético Goianiense, and was defeated by Cruzeiro, São Paulo, and Bahia. Juca was succeeded by Martín Varini, who took over the team from the 18th round of the tournament.

==== League table ====
Pos	Team	Pld	W	D	L	GF	GA	GD	Pts	Qualification or relegation
15	Juventude	38	11	12	15	48	59	−11	45	
16	Red Bull Bragantino	38	10	14	14	44	48	−4	44	
17	Athletico Paranaense (R)	38	11	9	18	40	46	−6	42	Relegation to Campeonato Brasileiro Série B
18	Criciúma (R)	38	9	11	18	42	61	−19	38	Relegation to Campeonato Brasileiro Série B
19	Atlético Goianiense (R)	38	7	9	22	29	58	−29	30	Relegation to Campeonato Brasileiro Série B

Source: CBF
Rules for classification: 1) points; 2) wins; 3) goal difference; 4) goals scored; 5) head-to-head results (only between two teams); 6) fewest red cards; 7) fewest yellow cards; 8) drawing of lots.
(R) Relegated

==== Results summary ====
Overall								Home						Away					
Pld	W	D	L	GF	GA	GD	Pts	W	D	L	GF	GA	GD	W	D	L	GF	GA	GD
38	11	9	18	40	46	−6	42	7	4	8	24	21	+3	4	5	10	16	25	−9

Last updated: November 11, 2024.

==== Results by round ====
Round	1	2	3	4	5	6	7	8	9	10	11	12	13	14	15	16	17	18	19	20	21	22	23	24	25	26	27	28	29	30	31	32	33	34	35	36	37	38
Ground	H	A	H	A	H	A	A	H	H	A	H	A	A	H	A	H	A	A	H	A	H	A	H	A	H	H	A	A	H	A	H	H	A	H	A	H	H	A
Result	W	L	W	D	W	W	L	W	D	D	D	L	W	L	W	L	L	L	W	W	L	D	L	L	L	D	D	L	L	L	W	L	L	W	D	D	L	L
Position	1	7	4	4	1	1	6	4	4	4	6	8	5	7	6	8	8	10	8	8	8	8	9	11	11	11	11	11	13	14	12	14	14	14	14	14	16	17

Updated to match(es) played on December 6, 2024. Source:
A = Away; H = Home; W = Win; D = Draw; L = Loss

==== Matches ====
The match schedule was released on 29 February.

Win Draw Loss Postponed

14 April 2024 1	Athletico Paranaense	4–0	Cuiabá	Curitiba, Paraná
16:00 BRT (UTC−3)	Pablo 22'; Canobbio 36'; L. Godoy 38'; Mastriani 81'	Report	Derik Lacerda (yellow card) 40'; Alan Empereur (yellow card) 45'; Filipe Augusto (yellow card) 80'	Stadium: Ligga Arena; Attendance: 22,169; Referee: Jonathan Benkenstein Pinheiro

17 April 2024 2	Grêmio	2–0	Athletico Paranaense	Porto Alegre, Rio Grande do Sul
16:00 BRT (UTC−3)	Cristaldo 19'; Soteldo 51'; Gustavo Nunes (yellow card) 71'	Report	Alex Santana (yellow card) 33'; Zé Vitor (yellow card) 59'; Esquivel (yellow card) 71'	Stadium: Arena do Grêmio; Attendance: 13,541; Referee: Marcelo de Lima Henrique

21 April 2024 3	Athletico Paranaense	1–0	Internacional	Curitiba, Paraná
16:00 UTC−3	Canobbio 71', (yellow card) 87' (yellow-red card) 87'; L. Godoy (yellow card) 9'; Fernandinho (yellow card) 79'; Thiago Heleno (yellow card) 82'	Report	Hugo Mallo (yellow card) 8'; Robert Renan (yellow card) 29'; Rômulo Zwarg (yellow card) 36'; Vitão (yellow card) 45'; Wesley (yellow card) 86'	Stadium: Ligga Arena; Attendance: 29,784; Referee: Felipe Fernandes de Lima

28 April 2024 4	Juventude	1–1	Athletico Paranaense	Caxias do Sul, Rio Grande do Sul
18:30 UTC−3	Erick Farias 8'; Caíque (yellow card) 49'; Lucas Barbosa (yellow card) 63'	Report	Nikão 73'; Julimar (yellow card) 76'; Bento (yellow card) 90+3'	Stadium: Alfredo Jaconi; Attendance: 5,032; Referee: Alex Gomes Stefano

5 May 2024 5	Athletico Paranaense	1–0	Vasco da Gama	Curitiba, Paraná
16:00 UTC−3	Erick 26'; Fernandinho (yellow card) 58'	Report	Hugo Moura (red card) 16'	Stadium: Ligga Arena; Attendance: 31,192; Referee: Anderson Daronco

12 May 2024 6	Palmeiras	0–2	Athletico Paranaense	Barueri, São Paulo
16:00 UTC−3	Mayke (yellow card) 34'; Endrick (yellow card) 45+8'; López (yellow card) 66'; Raphael Veiga (yellow card) 80'	Report	Pablo 45+9', (yellow card) 26'; Gómez 59' (o.g.); Esquivel (yellow card) 45+8' (yellow-red card) 67'; Godoy (yellow card) 46'; Gamarra (yellow card) 56'; Fernandinho (yellow card) 80'	Stadium: Arena Barueri; Attendance: 12,108; Referee: Bráulio da Silva Machado (Santa Catarina)

2 June 2024 7	Fortaleza	1–0	Athletico Paranaense	Fortaleza, Ceará
18:30 BRT (UTC−3)	Kuscevic 45'; Pedro Augusto (yellow card) 42'; Emmanuel Martínez (yellow card) 43'; Yago Pikachu (yellow card) 90+7'	Report	Felipinho (yellow card) 19'; Madson (yellow card) 47'; Christian (yellow card) 49'; Zé Vitor (yellow card) 69'	Stadium: Estádio Presidente Vargas; Attendance: 12,191; Referee: João Vitor Gobi

13 June 2024 8	Athletico Paranaense	3–1	Criciúma	Curitiba, Paraná
20:00 BRT (UTC−3)	Mastriani 23', 54'; Cuello 79'		Barreto 8'; Éder (yellow card) 22'	Stadium: Ligga Arena; Attendance: 23,424; Referee: Jonathan Benkenstein Pinheiro

16 June 2024 9	Athletico Paranaense	1–1	Flamengo	Curitiba, Paraná
16:00 BRT (UTC−3)	Fernandinho 90'; Pablo (yellow card) 90+6'; Zapelli (yellow card) 90+7'; Madson (yellow card) 90+8'	Report	Cebolinha 90+8'; Fabrício Bruno (yellow card) 90+7'	Stadium: Ligga Arena; Attendance: 38,641; Referee: Anderson Daronco

19 June 2024 10	Botafogo	1–1	Athletico Paranaense	Rio de Janeiro, Rio de Janeiro
19:00 BRT (UTC−3)	Bastos 90+8'	Report	Mastriani 53'; Erick (yellow card) 41'; Christian (yellow card) 76'; Lucas Esquivel (yellow card) 76'; Pablo (yellow card) 84'; Alex Santana (yellow card) 89'	Stadium: Nilton Santos; Attendance: 19,589; Referee: Ramon Abatti

23 June 2024 11	Athletico Paranaense	1–1	Corinthians	Curitiba, Paraná
16:00 BRT (UTC−3)	Christian 44'; Fernadinho (yellow card) 74'; Lucas Di Yorio (yellow card) 74'	Report	Cacá 90+1'; Pedro Raul (yellow card) 39'	Stadium: Ligga Arena; Attendance: 34,682; Referee: Felipe Fernandes de Lima

27 June 2024 12	Cruzeiro	2–0	Athletico Paranaense	Belo Horizonte, Minas Gerais
19:00 BRT (UTC−3)	Gabriel Veron 15'; Vitinho 90+1', (yellow card) 90+2'; Zé Ivaldo (yellow card) 73'	Report	Thiago Heleno (yellow card) 87'; Fernandinho (yellow card) 90+6'	Stadium: Mineirão; Attendance: 26,465; Referee: Davi de Oliveira Lacerda

30 June 2024 13	Vitória	0–1	Athletico Paranaense	Salvador, Bahia
18:30 BRT (UTC−3)	Léo Naldi (yellow card) 50'; Zé Hugo (yellow card) 62'; Caio Vinícius (yellow card) 90+2'	Report	Julimar 80'; Zapelli (yellow card) 10'; Pablo (yellow card) 81'	Stadium: Barradão; Attendance: 20,376; Referee: Bruno Arleu de Araujo

3 July 2024 14	Athletico Paranaense	1–2	São Paulo	Curitiba, Paraná
21:30 BRT (UTC−3)	Fernandinho 38'; Kaique Rocha (yellow card) 65'; Léo Linck (red card) 77'	Report	Ferreirinha 33', (yellow card) 86'; Calleri 61', (yellow card) 65'; Welington (yellow card) 74'	Stadium: Ligga Arena; Attendance: 28,632; Referee: Alex Gomes Stefano

7 July 2024 15	Atlético-GO	1–2	Athletico Paranaense	Goiânia, Goiás
18:30 BRT (UTC−3)	Luiz Fernando 47', (yellow card) 63'	Report	Julimar 49'; Di Yorio 77'; Fernando (yellow card) 63'; Mateo Gamarra (yellow card) 71'; Esquivel (yellow card) 82'	Stadium: Antônio Accioly; Attendance: 6,152; Referee: Joao Vitor Gobi

10 July 2024 16	Athletico Paranaense	1–3	Bahia	Curitiba, Paraná
19:00 BRT (UTC−3)	Di Yorio 60'; Fernandinho (yellow card) 35'; Thiago Heleno (yellow card) 48'	Report	Everaldo 54', (yellow card) 40'; Biel 60'; Luciano Juba 77'; Marcos Victor (yellow card) 78'; Danilo Fernandes (yellow card) 78'; Rezende (yellow card) 90+5'	Stadium: Ligga Arena; Attendance: 23,307; Referee: Felipe Fernandes de Lima

21 July 2024 18	RB Bragantino	1–0	Athletico Paranaense	Bragança Paulista, São Paulo
18:30 BRT (UTC−3)	Raul 7'; Cleiton (red card) 45+5'	Report		Stadium: Nabi Abi Chedid; Attendance: 4,423; Referee: Denis da Silva Ribeiro Serafim

28 July 2024 20	Cuiabá	1–2	Athletico Paranaense	Cuiabá, Mato Grosso
19:00 BRT (UTC−3)	Deyverson 90+6'	Report	Julimar 10', (yellow card) 37'; Di Yorio 90+3'; L. Godoy (yellow card) 86'	Stadium: Arena Pantanal; Attendance: 4,452; Referee: Jefferson Ferreira de Moraes

4 August 2024 21	Athletico Paranaense	0–2	Grêmio	Curitiba, Paraná
16:00 BRT (UTC−3)	Mateo Gamarra (yellow card) 16'; Cuello (yellow card) 82'	Report	Gustavo Martins 18'; Miguel Monsalve 21'	Stadium: Ligga Arena; Attendance: 26,339

11 August 2024 22	Internacional	2–2	Athletico Paranaense	Porto Alegre, Rio Grande do Sul
19:00 BRT (UTC−3)	Wesley 39'; Wanderson 90+6'; Bruno Henrique (yellow card) 54'	Report	João Cruz 39'; Canobbio 50'; Fernando (yellow card) 31'	Stadium: Beira-Rio; Attendance: 17,136; Referee: Paulo Cesar Zanovelli

18 August 2024 23	Athletico Paranaense	1–2	Juventude	Curitiba, Paraná
18:30 BRT (UTC−3)	Nikão 39'; Mateo Gamarra (yellow card) 23'; Gabriel (yellow card) 74'; Christian (yellow card) 86'; Bruno Zapelli (yellow card) 90'	Report	Nenê 30'; Yan Souto 67'; Jadson (yellow card) 19'; Alan Ruschel (yellow card) 82'	Stadium: Ligga Arena; Attendance: 22,926; Referee: João Vitor Gobi

26 August 2024 24	Vasco da Gama	2–1	Athletico Paranaense	Rio de Janeiro, Rio de Janeiro
21:00 BRT (UTC−3)	Emerson Rodríguez 68'; Pablo Vegetti 86'; Mateus Carvalho (yellow card) 48'	Report	Gabriel 24'; Thiago Heleno (yellow card) 14'; João Cruz (yellow card) 28'	Stadium: São Januário; Attendance: 16,775; Referee: Jonathan Benkenstein Pinheiro

1 September 2024 25	Athletico Paranaense	0–2	Palmeiras	Curitiba, Paraná
18:30 BRT (UTC−3)	Christian (yellow card) 31'; Canobbio (yellow card) 45+1'	Report	Maurício 8'; Estêvão Willian 58'; Marcos Rocha (yellow card) 48'	Stadium: Ligga Arena; Attendance: 28,344; Referee: Braulio da Silva Machado

14 September 2024 26	Athletico Paranaense	1–1	Fortaleza	Curitiba, Paraná
18:30 BRT (UTC−3)	Canobbio 28', (yellow card) 90+1'; João Cruz (yellow card) 61'	Report	Moisés 14'; Kuscevic (yellow card) 39'; João Ricardo (yellow card) 85'	Stadium: Ligga Arena; Attendance: 16,452; Referee: Davi Lacerda

22 September 2024 27	Criciúma	0–0	Athletico Paranaense	Criciúma, Santa Catarina
18:30 BRT (UTC−3)	Yannick Bolasie (yellow card) 9'; Tobias Figueiredo (yellow card) 85'	Report	Gabriel (yellow card) 73'; Felipinho (yellow card) 90+3'	Stadium: Heriberto Hülse; Attendance: TBD; Referee: Anderson Daronco

29 September 2024 28	Flamengo	1–0	Athletico Paranaense	Rio de Janeiro, Rio de Janeiro
20:00 BRT (UTC−3)	Gerson 90'; G. Barbosa (yellow card) 26'; David Luiz (yellow card) 36'	Report	Mateo Gamarra (yellow card) 26'; Christian (yellow card) 80'	Stadium: Maracanã; Attendance: 28,708; Referee: Davi de Oliveira Lacerda

5 October 2024 29	Athletico Paranaense	0–1	Botafogo	Curitiba, Paraná
16:30 BRT (UTC−3)	Madson (yellow card) 75'; Kaique Rocha (yellow card) 76'	Report	Igor Jesus 14'; Gregore (yellow card) 43'; Danilo Barbosa (yellow card) 84'; Tiquinho Soares (yellow card) 90'; Matheus Martins (yellow card) 90+3'	Stadium: Ligga Arena; Attendance: 23,646; Referee: Flavio Rodrigues de Souza

20 October 2024 30	Corinthians	5–2	Athletico Paranaense	São Paulo, São Paulo
20:00 BRT (UTC−3)	Yuri Alberto 78' (yellow card) 59'; Rodrigo Garro 66'; Memphis 55' (yellow card) 25'; Cacá 18' (yellow card) 90+2'; Matheuzinho 5'; José Andrés Martínez (yellow card) 45+3'	Report	Erick 39'; Nikão 30'; Lucas Belezi (yellow card) 54'; Julimar (yellow card) 44'; Thiago Heleno (yellow card) 25'	Stadium: Neo Química Arena; Attendance: 44,399; Referee: Wilton Pereira Sampaio

22 October 2024 17	Fluminense	1–0	Athletico Paranaense	Rio de Janeiro, Rio de Janeiro
19:30 BRT (UTC−3)	Cano 81'; Facundo Bernal (yellow card) 90+6'; Jhon Arias (yellow card) 54'; Samuel Xavier (yellow card) 14'	Report	Mycael (yellow card) 71'; Nikão (yellow card) 27'; Fernando (yellow card) 16'; Kaique Rocha (yellow card) 7'	Stadium: Maracanã; Attendance: 39,465; Referee: Braúlio da Silva Machado

26 October 2024 31	Athletico Paranaense	3–0	Cruzeiro	Curitiba, Paraná
18:30 BRT (UTC−3)	Nikão 80'; Julimar 46'; Pablo 25'	Report	William (yellow card) 90+1'; Zé Ivaldo (yellow card) 50'; Fabrizio Peralta (yellow card) 23'; Rafael da Silva (red card) 1'	Stadium: Ligga Arena; Attendance: 35,959; Referee: Rodrigo José Pereira de Lima

2 November 2024 32	Athletico Paranaense	1–2	Vitória	Curitiba, Paraná
18:30 BRT (UTC−3)	Julimar 31'; Tomás Cuello (yellow card) 68'	Report	Matheuzinho 65'; Alerrandro 33'; Lucas Esteves (yellow card) 68'; Machado (yellow card) 66'; Lucas Arcanjo (yellow card) 55'; Willian (yellow card) 52'	Stadium: Ligga Arena; Attendance: 40,666; Referee: Luiz Flavio de Oliveira

9 November 2024 33	São Paulo	2–1	Athletico Paranaense	São Paulo, São Paulo
21:00 BRT (UTC−3)	André Silva 89'; Luciano 52'; Igor Vinícius (yellow card) 90+2'; Lucas Moura (yellow card) 74'		Julimar 69' (yellow card) 75'; Lucas Belezi (yellow card) 81'; Felipinho (yellow card) 62'; Erick (yellow card) 42'; L. Godoy (yellow card) 3'	Stadium: MorumBIS; Attendance: 34,777; Referee: Rafael Rodrigo Klein

16 November 2024 19	Athletico Paranaense	1–0	Atlético-MG	Curitiba, Paraná
18:30 BRT (UTC−3)	Cuello 28'; Nikão (yellow card) 59'; Pablo (yellow card) 18'	Report	Lyanco (yellow card) 71'; Scarpa (yellow card) 27'	Stadium: Ligga Arena; Attendance: 40,935; Referee: Matheus Delgado Candançan

20 November 2024 34	Athletico Paranaense	2–0	Atlético-GO	Curitiba, Paraná
16:30 BRT (UTC−3)	Nikão 66'; Tomás Cuello 41+5'; Thiago Heleno (red card) 74'; L. Godoy (yellow card) 41'	Report	Shaylon (yellow card) 36'; Adriano Martins (yellow card) 16'	Stadium: Ligga Arena; Attendance: 42,177; Referee: Alex Gomes Stefano

24 November 2024 35	Bahia	1–1	Athletico Paranaense	Salvador, Bahia
21:00 BRT (UTC−3)	Gabriel Teixeira 90+3'; Gabriel Xavier (yellow card) 90+6'	Report	Nikão 62'; Mycael (yellow card) 72'; Fernando (yellow card) 74'	Stadium: Arena Fonte Nova; Attendance: 26,307; Referee: Rodrigo Jose Pereira de Lima

1 December 2024 36	Athletico Paranaense	1–1	Fluminense	Curitiba, Paraná
18:30 BRT (UTC−3)	Lucas Belezi 2'; Léo Linck (red card) 43'; Christian (yellow card) 42'	Report	Arias 65'; Ganso (red card) 90+4'; Germán Cano (yellow card) 90+3'; Lima (yellow card) 45+3'	Stadium: Ligga Arena; Attendance: 41,375; Referee: Raphael Claus

5 December 2024 37	Athletico Paranaense	1–2	RB Bragantino	Curitiba, Paraná
20:00 BRT (UTC−3)	Erick 74'; Fernandinho (yellow card) 89'	Report	Eduardo Sasha 1', 82', (yellow card) 83'; Jadsom (yellow card) 90+2'; Vinicinho (yellow card) 67'; Matheus Fernandes (yellow card) 45+1'; Pedro Henrique (yellow card) 34'	Stadium: Ligga Arena; Attendance: 41,626; Referee: Rodrigo José Pereira de Lima

8 December 2024 38	Atlético-MG	1–0	Athletico Paranaense	Belo Horizonte, Minas Gerais
21:00 BRT (UTC−3)	Rubens 73'; Everson (yellow card) 90'; Brahian Palacios (yellow card) 73'	Report	Canobbio (yellow card) 24'; Fernandinho (yellow card) 56'; Thiago Heleno (yellow card) 66'	Stadium: Arena MRV; Attendance: 0 Referee: Rodrigo Jose Pereira de Lima

=== Copa do Brasil ===
==== Third round ====
1 May 2024 First leg	Ypiranga	2–1	Athletico Paranaense	Erechim, Rio Grande do Sul
18:00 UTC−3	Mateus Anderson 90+5'; Fabricio Pereira 90+8'	Report	Canobbio 34'	Stadium: Colosso da Lagoa; Attendance: 3,031; Referee: Gustavo Ervino Bauermann

13 July 2024 Second leg	Athletico Paranaense	3–0 (4–2 agg.)	Ypiranga	Curitiba, Paraná
19:30 UTC−3	Fernandinho 24'; Julimar 46'; Lucas Di Yorio 90+5'	Report		Stadium: Ligga Arena; Attendance: 23,052; Referee: Bruno Arleu de Araujo

==== Round of 16 ====
31 July 2024 First leg	Athletico Paranaense	2–0	RB Bragantino	Curitiba, Paraná
19:00 UTC−3	Zapelli 20'; Christian 27'; Mastriani (penalty missed) 45+4'; Fernandinho (yellow card) 37'; Erick (yellow card) 55'; Christian (yellow card) 73'; Gabriel (yellow card) 87'	Report	Lucas Evangelista (yellow card) 62'	Stadium: Ligga Arena; Attendance: 25,474; Referee: Wagner do Nascimento Magalhaes

7 August 2024 Second leg	RB Bragantino	2–3 (2–5 agg.)	Athletico Paranaense	Bragança Paulista, São Paulo
19:00 UTC−3	Thiago Borbas 87', 90'; Luan Cândido (yellow card) 47'; Helinho (yellow card) 51'; Eric Ramires (yellow card) 72'; Thiago Borbas (yellow card) 77'; Lucas Ferrugem (yellow card) 79'	Report	Canobbio 18'; Mastriani 61'; Fernandinho 73'; Cuello (yellow card) 16'; Thiago Heleno (yellow card) 38'	Stadium: Nabi Abi Chedid; Attendance: 3,967; Referee: Wilton Pereira Sampaio

==== Quarter-finals ====
29 August 2024 First leg	Vasco da Gama	2–1	Athletico Paranaense	Rio de Janeiro, Rio de Janeiro
20:00 UTC−3	Puma 80'; Hugo Moura 90+3'; Pablo Vegetti (yellow card) 30'; João Victor (yellow card) 35'		Christian 32', (yellow card) 39'; Mycael (yellow card) 25'; Thiago Heleno (yellow card) 36'; Canobbio (yellow card) 51'	Stadium: São Januário; Attendance: 18,068; Referee: Ramon Abatti Abel

11 September 2024 Second leg	Athletico Paranaense	2–1 (3–3 agg.) (4–5 p)	Vasco da Gama	Curitiba, Paraná
21:30 UTC−3	Cuello 25'; Bruno Zapelli 33', (yellow card) 48'; Kaique Rocha (yellow card) 26'; Madson (yellow card) 27'; Kaique Rocha (yellow card) 90+2'	Report	Pablo Vegetti 45+1'; Juan Sforza (yellow card) 30'; Rayan (red card) 42'; Souza (yellow card) 69'	Stadium: Ligga Arena; Attendance: 34,097; Referee: Wilton Pereira Sampaio
	Penalties
	Pablo (penalty scored); Mastriani (penalty scored); Canobbio (penalty missed); Madson (penalty scored); João Cruz (penalty scored)		Juan Sforza (penalty scored); Bebanz (penalty scored); Victor Luis (penalty scored); Mateus Carvalho (penalty scored); Pablo Vegetti (penalty scored)

=== Copa Sudamericana ===
==== Group stage ====
Pos	Team	Pld	W	D	L	GF	GA	GD	Pts	Qualification	SPA	CAP	DAN	DRZ
1	(Paraguay) Sportivo Ameliano	6	4	1	1	9	5	+4	13	Advance to round of 16	—	1–4	2–1	1–0
2	(Brazil) Athletico Paranaense	6	4	0	2	17	5	+12	12	Advance to knockout round play-offs	0–1	—	1–2	6–0
3	(Uruguay) Danubio	6	2	2	2	5	4	+1	8		0–0	0–1	—	0–0
4	(Venezuela) Rayo Zuliano	6	0	1	5	1	18	−17	1		0–4	1–5	0–2	—

Source: CONMEBOL

2 April 2024 1	Sportivo Ameliano (Paraguay)	1–4	(Brazil) Athletico Paranaense	Asunción, Paraguay
18:00 UTC−4	Vera 15'	Report	Mastriani 6', 73'; Zapelli 32'; Fernandinho 45+2'	Stadium: Estadio General Pablo Rojas; Attendance: 9,790; Referee: Andrés Merlos (Argentina)

9 April 2024 2	Athletico Paranaense (Brazil)	6–0	(Venezuela) Rayo Zuliano	Curitiba, Brazil
21:30 UTC−3	Fernandinho 15' (pen.); Esquivel 23'; Canobbio 27', 76'; Pablo 45+1'; Mastriani 66'	Report		Stadium: Ligga Arena; Attendance: 22,317; Referee: Ivo Méndez (Bolivia)

24 April 2024 3	Danubio (Uruguay)	0–1	(Brazil) Athletico Paranaense	Montevideo, Uruguay
19:00 UTC−3		Report	Madson 16'	Stadium: Estadio Centenario; Attendance: 1,178; Referee: Kevin Ortega (Peru)

8 May 2024 4	Rayo Zuliano (Venezuela)	1–5	(Brazil) Athletico Paranaense	Caracas, Venezuela
18:00 UTC−4	Ochoa 63'	Report	Esquivel 22'; Mastriani 33', 37'; Di Yorio 75' (pen.); Felipinho 81'	Stadium: Estadio Brígido Iriarte; Attendance: 784; Referee: Bryan Loayza (Ecuador)

15 May 2024 5	Athletico Paranaense (Brazil)	1–2	(Uruguay) Danubio	Curitiba, Brazil
19:00 UTC−3	Di Yorio 90+4'	Report	Pintos 29'; Fernández 42'	Stadium: Ligga Arena; Attendance: 22,926; Referee: Carlos Ortega (Colombia)

30 May 2024 6	Athletico Paranaense (Brazil)	0–1	(Paraguay) Sportivo Ameliano	Curitiba, Brazil
19:00 UTC−3		Report	R. Torales 61'	Stadium: Ligga Arena; Attendance: 26,026; Referee: Leandro Rey Hilfer (Argentina)

==== Knockout round play-offs ====
18 July 2024 First leg	Cerro Porteño (Paraguay)	1–1	(Brazil) Athletico Paranaense	Asunción, Paraguay
20:30 UTC−4	Alan Benítez 33'; Churín (penalty missed) 45+8'; Enzo Giménez (yellow card) 71'; Piris da Motta (yellow card) 53'	Report	Christian (yellow card) 67', (goal) 69'; Fernandinho (penalty missed) 79'; Leonardo Godoy (yellow card) 49'; Julimar (yellow card) 49'; Pablo (yellow card) 81'	Stadium: Estadio General Pablo Rojas; Referee: Esteban Ostojich

25 July 2024 Second leg	Athletico Paranaense (Brazil)	2–1 (3–2 agg.)	(Paraguay) Cerro Porteño	Curitiba, Brazil
21:30 UTC−3	Mastriani 3'; Cuello 59'; Fernandinho (yellow card) 22'; Bruno Zapelli (yellow card) 26' (yellow-red card) 66'	Report	Fernando Fernández 68'; Miguel Benítez (yellow card) 30'; Víctor Cabañas (yellow card) 71' (yellow-red card) 83'	Stadium: Ligga Arena; Attendance: 28,196; Referee: Felipe González

==== Round of 16 ====
15 August 2024 First leg	Athletico Paranaense (Brazil)	2–1	(Argentina) Belgrano	Curitiba, Brazil
19:00 UTC−3	Erick 41'; Christian 62'; Thiago Heleno (yellow card) 27'; Canobbio (yellow card) 29'; Fernandinho (yellow card) 86'	Report	Franco Jara 1'; Juan Barinaga (yellow card) 29'; Facundo Quignon (yellow card) 36'; Ignacio Chicco (yellow card) 61'; Matías Agustín Moreno (yellow card) 86'	Stadium: Ligga Arena; Attendance: 27,275; Referee: Gery Vargas

22 August 2024 Second leg	Belgrano (Argentina)	0–2 (1–4 agg.)	(Brazil) Athletico Paranaense	Córdoba, Argentina
19:00 UTC−3	Esteban Rolón (yellow card) 6'; Jara (yellow card) 87'	Report	Mastriani 54'; Di Yorio 89'; Erick (yellow card) 20'; Esquivel (red card) 21'; Fernandinho (yellow card) 49'; Christian (yellow card) 64'	Stadium: Estadio Mario Alberto Kempes; Referee: Carlos Benítez

==== Quarter-finals ====
19 September 2024 First leg	Athletico Paranaense (Brazil)	1–0	(Argentina) Racing	Curitiba, Brazil
21:30 UTC−3	João Cruz 38'; Kaique Rocha (yellow card) 22'; Gabriel (yellow card) 26'	Report	Gastón Martirena (yellow card) 80'	Stadium: Ligga Arena; Attendance: 24,214; Referee: Cristián Marcelo Garay Reyes

26 September 2024 Second leg	Racing (Argentina)	4–1 (4–2 agg.)	(Brazil) Athletico Paranaense	Avellaneda, Argentina
21:30 UTC−3	Almendra 1', (yellow card) 30'; Adrián Martínez 23'; Roger Martínez 42'; Gastón Martirena 77'; Juan Nardoni (yellow card) 44'		Nikão 47'; Canobbio (yellow card) 53'; Erick (yellow card) 35'	Stadium: Estadio Presidente Perón; Referee: Andrés José Rojas Noguera
