= Mycael =

Brazilian footballer

Personal information
- Full name: Mycael Pontes Moreira
- Date of birth: 12 March 2004 (age 22)
- Place of birth: Porto Velho, Brazil
- Height: 1.91 m (6 ft 3 in)
- Position: Goalkeeper

Team information
- Current team: Athletico Paranaense
- Number: 1

Youth career
- 2017–2019: Trieste
- 2019–2022: Athletico Paranaense

Senior career*
Years	Team	Apps	(Gls)
2023–	Athletico Paranaense	65	(0)

International career^{‡}
2019	Brazil U15	2	(0)
2020	Brazil U17		
2021–2023	Brazil U20	15	(0)
2023–	Brazil U23	10	(0)
Medal record
Men's football
Representing Brazil
South American U-20 Championship
Winner	2023 Colombia
Pan American Games
Winner	2023 Santiago
- * Club domestic league appearances and goals as of 15:21, 10 November 2026 (UTC) ‡ National team caps and goals as of 30 April 2024

Mycael Pontes Moreira (born 12 March 2004), simply known as Mycael, is a Brazilian professional footballer who plays as a goalkeeper for Athletico Paranaense and the Brazil national under-20 football team.

== Early life ==
From Porto Velho, Rondônia, his father Moisés Moreira recalls Mycael initially played as a left-back when he first trained with local neighbourhood side Seu Zeca. However, the regular goalkeeper didn't turn up one day and Mycael played in goal and saved a penalty and made a number of other saves. Mycael has a number of amateur goalkeepers in his family.

== Club career ==
Mycael signed his first professional contract with Athletico Paranaense aged 16 in 2020. In November 2022, the club announced that Maycael would be promoted to the senior first team squad for the 2023 season.

Initially a third-choice behind Bento and Léo Linck, Mycael became a backup option after Bento left in 2024, and made his professional – and Série A – debut on 4 July of that year, coming on as a late substitute for Lucas Esquivel in a 2–1 home loss to São Paulo, after Linck was sent off. He became a starter after Linck suffered an injury in September, and was kept as a first-choice by head coach Martín Varini after Linck's return.

== International career ==
Mycael made his debut with the Brazil under-15 age group team against a Paraguay age group team on 25 July 2019. He won the under-15 South American championship that year, and the following year made his debut for the Brazil under-17 team. He was also named goalkeeper of the tournament at the Revelations Cup in Mexico in 2021.

Mycael won the 2023 South American U-20 Championship with Brazil. He was awarded man of the match for the final game which secured the title for Brazil, against Uruguay. He has also saved a penalty in a match for Brazil against Argentina. His displays led him to being one of the players singled out from the tournament by South American football pundit Tim Vickery among those who “enhanced their reputations in Colombia [with] careers worth watching”.

On 3 March 2023, Mycael was called up to the senior Brazil squad for the first time as interim coach Ramon Menezes prepared a team to play a friendly match against Morocco.

== Personal life ==
Mycael joined Trieste, an amateur team from Curitiba, in 2017. There, he lived for two years with teammate and fellow goalkeeper Bernardo Pisetta and his family prior to his move to Athletico Paranaense aged 14. Mycael honors his friend Bernardo, who died in the Flamengo training ground fire in 2019, by wearing a shirt underneath his match day jersey which contains a picture of him, a practice he said he will continue throughout his career, saying:

"I'm fulfilling his dream, fighting every day and thinking that there will always be 12 on the field. A goalkeeper down here and a goalkeeper up there.”

== Career statistics ==
As of 10 November 2026

Appearances and goals by club, season and competition
Club	Season	League			State League		Cup		Continental		Other		Total	
Club	Season	Division	Apps	Goals	Apps	Goals	Apps	Goals	Apps	Goals	Apps	Goals	Apps	Goals
Athletico Paranaense	2022	Série A	0	0	—		0	0	0	0	—		0	0
Athletico Paranaense	2023	Série A	0	0	0	0	0	0	0	0	—		0	0
Athletico Paranaense	2024	Série A	19	0	0	0	1	0	2 (Note: Appearance(s) in Copa Sudamericana)	0	—		22	0
Athletico Paranaense	2025	Série B	17	0	13	0	4	0	—		—		34	0
Athletico Paranaense	2026	Série A	10	0	6	0	0	0	—		—		16	0
Career total			46	0	19	0	5	0	2	0	0	0	72	0

== Honours ==
Brazil U23

- Pan American Games: 2023

Brazil U20

- South American U-20 Championship: 2023

Brazil U15

- South American U-15 Championship: 2019
