= João Cruz (footballer, born 2006) =

Brazilian footballer (born 2006)

Personal information
- Full name: João Victor Machado Cruz
- Date of birth: 12 May 2006 (age 20)
- Place of birth: São Paulo, Brazil
- Height: 1.70 m (5 ft 7 in)
- Position: Midfielder

Team information
- Current team: Athletico Paranaense
- Number: 8

Youth career
- 2018–2024: Athletico Paranaense

Senior career*
Years	Team	Apps	(Gls)
2024–	Athletico Paranaense	80	(9)
- * Club domestic league appearances and goals as of 15:39, 10 November 2026 (UTC)

João Victor Machado Cruz (born 12 May 2006), known as João Cruz, is a Brazilian footballer who plays as a midfielder for Athletico Paranaense.

== Career ==
Born in São Paulo, João Cruz joined Athletico Paranaense's youth sides in 2018, aged 12. On 4 December 2022, he signed his first professional contract with the club, after agreeing to a three-year deal.

João Cruz made his first team debut with Furacão on 8 May 2024, coming on as a second-half substitute for Bruno Zapelli in a 5–1 away routing of Deportivo Rayo Zuliano, for the year's Copa Sudamericana. On 6 June, he renewed his link until February 2028, and made his Série A debut twenty days later, replacing Nikão in a 2–0 away loss to Cruzeiro.

== Career statistics ==
As of 10 November 2026

Club	Season	League			State League		Cup		Continental		Other		Total	
Club	Season	Division	Apps	Goals	Apps	Goals	Apps	Goals	Apps	Goals	Apps	Goals	Apps	Goals
Athletico Paranaense	2024	Série A	18	1	—		3	0	5 (Note: Appearance(s) in Copa Sudamericana)	1	—		26	2
Athletico Paranaense	2025	Série B	16	2	11	2	4	0	—		—		31	4
Athletico Paranaense	2026	Série A	27	2	8	2	4	1	—		—		39	5
Total			61	5	19	4	11	1	5	1	0	0	96	11
