= Paulo Turra =

Brazilian football coach and former player

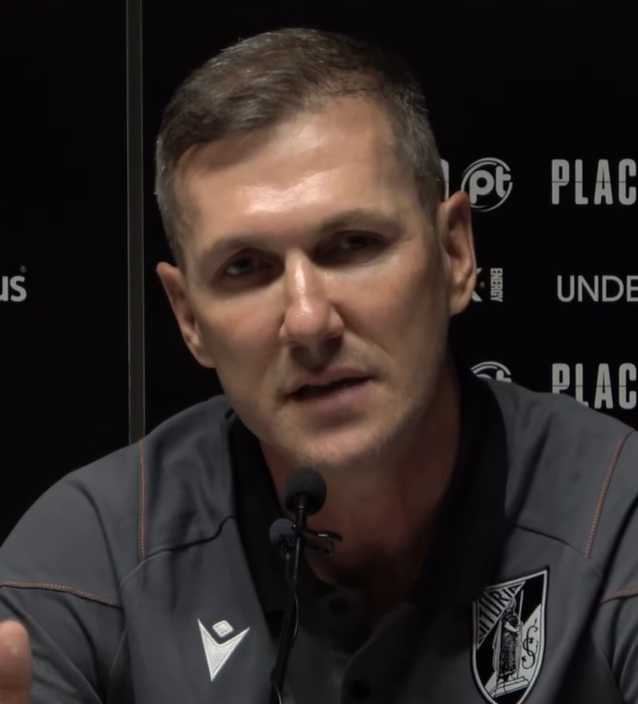
- Turra in 2023

Personal information
- Full name: Paulo César Turra
- Date of birth: 14 November 1973 (age 52)
- Place of birth: Tuparendi, Brazil
- Height: 1.84 m (6 ft 0 in)
- Position: Centre-back

Youth career
- 1990–1992: Caxias

Senior career*
Years	Team	Apps	(Gls)
1991–2000	Caxias	156	(4)
1997	→ Botafogo (loan)	4	(0)
2000–2001	Palmeiras	25	(2)
2001–2004	Boavista	91	(1)
2004–2006	Vitória de Guimarães	19	(0)
2006	Novo Hamburgo	5	(0)
2007	Sertãozinho	5	(0)
2007	Avaí	15	(0)
Total		317	(7)

Managerial career
- 2008–2009: Novo Hamburgo (assistant)
- 2009: Novo Hamburgo
- 2010: Esportivo
- 2010: Glória
- 2010–2011: Brusque
- 2011: Brasil de Farroupilha
- 2012–2013: Cianorte
- 2013: Operário Ferroviário
- 2013: Marcílio Dias
- 2014: Avaí
- 2015: Caxias
- 2016: Cianorte
- 2016–2017: Guangzhou Evergrande (assistant)
- 2018–2019: Palmeiras (assistant)
- 2020–2021: Cruzeiro (assistant)
- 2021: Grêmio (assistant)
- 2022: Athletico Paranaense (assistant)
- 2023: Athletico Paranaense
- 2023: Santos
- 2023: Vitória de Guimarães
- 2025: Vila Nova
- * Club domestic league appearances and goals

Paulo César Turra (born 14 November 1973), known as Paulo Turra, is a Brazilian football coach and former player who played as a central defender.

== Playing career ==
Born in Tuparendi, Rio Grande do Sul, Turra started playing football with local side Caxias, making his first team debut in 1991. In 1997, he moved on loan to Série A side Botafogo, but only featured rarely.

Back to Caxias, Turra helped his the side to win their first-ever Campeonato Gaúcho in 2000, under the management of Tite. On 5 July of that year, he joined Palmeiras in the top tier.

In July 2001, after winning the previous year's Copa dos Campeões and Copa Mercosur, Turra moved abroad and signed for Boavista in Portugal. He was runner-up of Primeira Liga once and played against young Cristiano Ronaldo, Sporting CP's player at that time; he also played for Boavista in a 2002–03 UEFA Cup semi-final against Celtic.

On 24 August 2004, Turra agreed to a one-year contract with Vitória de Guimarães, also in the Portuguese top tier. In January 2006, after falling down the pecking order, he went on a trial at Scottish side Hibernian, but nothing came of it.

In 2006, after his contract with Vitória expired, Turra returned to Brazil and joined Novo Hamburgo. Ahead of the 2007 season, he moved to Sertãozinho, but left the side for Avaí in March of that year.

Turra retired in December 2007, aged 34.

== Coaching career ==
After retiring, Turra returned to Novo Hamburgo in 2008, as an assistant coach. On 27 February 2009, after head coach Gilmar Iser left for Juventude, he was named head coach of the club.

Turra was sacked on 26 October 2009, after a 4–1 loss to Brasil de Pelotas. The following January, he replaced Celso Freitas at the helm of Esportivo, but was dismissed on 8 March, with the club in an eight-match losing run.

On 15 November 2010, Turra was appointed Brusque manager for the upcoming season, but was relieved from his duties the following 14 February. He then worked at Brasil de Farroupilha before being named in charge of Cianorte on 23 November 2011.

Turra was sacked from Cianorte on 18 February 2013, after a poor start of the season. He then took over Paraná state side Operário Ferroviário late in the month, before being moved to Marcílio Dias with his technical staff in May, as the club was playing in the Série D.

After a failed move to Daegu FC in February 2014, Turra returned to Avaí on the 14th of that month, replacing Emerson Nunes. On 7 March, however, after only three matches, he was sacked.

On 15 October 2014, Turra was appointed head coach of another club he represented as a player, Caxias. He was dismissed on 12 March of the following year, and returned to Cianorte on 19 November 2015.

Turra left Cianorte on 2 December 2016, to join Luiz Felipe Scolari (his head coach during his playing days at Palmeiras) at Chinese club Guangzhou Evergrande, as his assistant. He followed Scolari under the same capacity in the following years, at Palmeiras, Cruzeiro, Grêmio and Athletico Paranaense.

On 13 November 2022, after Scolari announced his retirement from coaching and moved to a director role, Turra became the head coach of Athletico. He won the 2023 Campeonato Paranaense with the club with an unbeaten status, the club's second time in their history since 1936, but was dismissed on 16 June 2023.

On 23 June 2023, Turra was named head coach of Santos, replacing Odair Hellmann. On 6 August, after only one win in seven matches, he was sacked.

On 21 August 2023, Turra returned to Vitória de Guimarães, being named manager of the side on a two-year contract. On 3 October, following two wins in six matches, Turra was sacked and replaced by Álvaro Pacheco the following day.

On 3 August 2025, after more than a year without a club, Turra was named head coach of Vila Nova in his country's Série B. He was sacked on 24 September, after six winless matches in his eight games in charge.

== Career statistics ==
Club	Season	League			State League		Cup		Continental		Other		Total	
Club	Season	Division	Apps	Goals	Apps	Goals	Apps	Goals	Apps	Goals	Apps	Goals	Apps	Goals
Caxias	1991	Série B	0	0	1	0	0	0	—		—		1	0
Caxias	1992	Gaúcho	—		5	0	—		—		—		5	0
Caxias	1993	Gaúcho	—		3	0	—		—		—		3	0
Caxias	1994	Gaúcho	—		10	0	—		—		—		10	0
Caxias	1995	Série C	8	0	12	0	—		—		—		20	0
Caxias	1996	Série C	7	0	16	0	—		—		15 (Note: Appearance(s) in Copa Daltro Menezes)	0	38	0
Caxias	1997	Série C	0	0	20	2	—		—		—		20	2
Caxias	1998	Série C	10	0	9	0	—		—		8 (Note: Appearance(s) in Copa Ênio Andrade)	0	27	0
Caxias	1999	Série C	14	0	17	1	2	0	—		6 (Note: Appearance(s) in Copa Sul)	0	39	1
Caxias	2000	Copa João Havelange	0	0	24	1	5	0	—		—		29	1
Caxias	Total		39	0	117	4	7	0	—		29	0	192	4
Botafogo (loan)	1997	Série A	4	0	—		—		—		—		4	0
Palmeiras	2000	Copa João Havelange	16	0	—		—		7 (Note: Appearance(s) in Copa Mercosur)	1	4 (Note: Appearance(s) in Copa dos Campeões)	0	27	1
Palmeiras	2001	Série A	0	0	9	2	—		3 (Note: Appearance(s) in Copa Libertadores)	0	1 (Note: Appearance(s) in Torneio Rio–São Paulo)	0	13	2
Palmeiras	Total		16	0	9	2	—		10	1	5	0	40	3
Boavista	2001–02	Primeira Liga	31	0	—		1	0	10 (Note: Appearance(s) in UEFA Champions League)	0	—		42	0
Boavista	2002–03	Primeira Liga	23	1	—		1	0	12 (Note: Three appearances and one goal in UEFA Champions League, nine appearances in UEFA Cup)	0	—		36	2
Boavista	2003–04	Primeira Liga	18	1	—		1	0	—		—		19	1
Boavista	2004–05	Primeira Liga	19	0	—		0	0	—		—		19	0
Boavista	Total		91	1	—		3	0	22	1	—		116	2
Vitória de Guimarães	2005–06	Primeira Liga	19	0	—		—		—		—		19	0
Novo Hamburgo	2006	Série C	5	0	—		—		—		0	0	5	0
Sertãozinho	2007	Paulista	—		5	0	2	0	—		—		7	0
Avaí	2007	Série B	12	0	—		—		—		—		12	0
Career total			186	1	131	6	12	0	32	2	34	0	395	9

== Managerial statistics ==
As of 25 September 2025

Managerial record by team and tenure
Team	Nat.	From	To	Record								Ref
Team	Nat.	From	To	G	W	D	L	GF	GA	GD	Win %	Ref
Novo Hamburgo	(Brazil)	27 February 2009	26 October 2009	24	10	2	12	28	32	−4	41.67	
Esportivo	(Brazil)	23 January 2010	8 March 2010	8	0	1	7	7	23	−16	0.00	
Brusque	(Brazil)	15 November 2010	14 February 2011	9	3	3	3	18	17	+1	33.33	
Brasil de Farroupilha	(Brazil)	25 March 2011	11 July 2011	26	14	8	4	49	26	+23	53.85	
Cianorte	(Brazil)	23 November 2011	18 February 2013	43	18	13	12	59	44	+15	41.86	
Operário Ferroviário	(Brazil)	28 February 2013	20 May 2013	12	6	3	3	21	13	+8	50.00	
Marcílio Dias	(Brazil)	20 May 2013	26 August 2013	8	3	2	3	10	9	+1	37.50	
Avaí	(Brazil)	14 February 2014	7 March 2014	3	0	0	3	2	6	−4	0.00	
Caxias	(Brazil)	15 October 2014	12 March 2015	11	3	2	6	10	12	−2	27.27	
Cianorte	(Brazil)	19 November 2015	2 December 2016	13	8	5	0	18	7	+11	61.54	
Athletico Paranaense	(Brazil)	13 November 2022	16 June 2023	35	24	4	7	63	31	+32	68.57	
Santos	(Brazil)	23 June 2023	6 August 2023	6	1	3	2	7	10	−3	16.67	
Vitória de Guimarães	(Portugal)	21 August 2023	3 October 2023	6	2	1	3	6	9	−3	33.33	
Vila Nova	(Brazil)	3 August 2025	24 September 2025	8	2	4	2	9	10	−1	25.00	
Career total				212	94	51	67	307	249	+58	44.34	—

== Honours ==
=== Player ===
Caxias

- Copa Daltro Menezes: 1996
- Copa Ênio Andrade: 1998
- Campeonato Gaúcho: 2000

Palmeiras

- Copa dos Campeões: 2000

=== Manager ===
Cianorte

- Campeonato Paranaense Série Prata: 2016

Athletico Paranaense

- Campeonato Paranaense: 2023
