= 2023 Campeonato Paranaense =

Football competition in Brazil

Campeonato Paranaense
- Season: 2023
- Dates: 14 January - 9 April
- Champions: Athletico Paranaense
- Relegated: Foz do Iguaçu; Rio Branco
- Copa do Brasil: Athletico Paranaense; Coritiba; FC Cascavel; Maringá; Operário Ferroviário
- Série D: Cianorte; FC Cascavel; Maringá
- Matches played: 74
- Goals scored: 180 (2.43 per match)
- Top goalscorer: Pablo (8 goals)
- All statistics correct as of 9 April 2023.

The 2023 Campeonato Paranaense (officially the Campeonato Paranaense 1XBET 2023 for sponsorship reasons) was the 109th edition of the top division of football in the state of Paraná organized by FPF. The competition began on 14 January and ended on 9 April 2023. Coritiba were the defending champions but were eliminated in the quarter-finals.

== Format ==
In the first stage, each team played the other eleven teams in a single round-robin tournament. The teams were ranked according to points. If tied on points, the following criteria would be used to determine the ranking: 1. Wins; 2. Goal difference; 3. Goals scored; 4. Head-to-head results (only between two teams); 5. Fewest red cards; 6. Fewest yellow cards; 7. Draw in the headquarters of the FPF.

Top eight teams advanced to the quarter-finals of the final stages. The bottom two teams were relegated to the second division. Top three teams not already qualified for 2024 Série A, Série B or Série C will qualified for 2024 Série D.

Final stage will be played on a home-and-away two-legged basis, with the best overall performance team hosting the second leg. If tied on aggregate, the penalty shoot-out will be used to determine the winners. Top four teams will qualify for the 2024 Copa do Brasil.

== Participating teams ==
Club	Home city	Manager	2022 result	Titles (last)
Aruko	Maringá	Rafael Andrade	2nd (Seg.)	0
Athletico Paranaense	Curitiba	Paulo Turra	4th	26 (2020)
Azuriz	Marmeleiro	Tcheco	10th	0
Cianorte	Cianorte	Alexandre Gallo	8th	0
Coritiba	Curitiba	António Oliveira	1st	39 (2022)
FC Cascavel	Cascavel	Luiz Carlos Cruz	7th	0
Foz do Iguaçu	Foz do Iguaçu	Negreiros	1st (Seg.)	0
Londrina	Londrina	Omar Feitosa	5th	5 (2021)
Maringá	Maringá	Jorge Castilho	2nd	0
Operário Ferroviário	Ponta Grossa	Rafael Guanaes	3rd	1 (2015)
Rio Branco	Paranaguá	Norberto Lemos	9th	0
São Joseense	São José dos Pinhais	Zé Roberto	6th	0

== First stage ==
Pos	Team	Pld	W	D	L	GF	GA	GD	Pts	Qualification or relegation
1	Athletico Paranaense	11	10	1	0	25	6	+19	31	Advance to Quarter-finals
2	Operário Ferroviário	11	8	1	2	20	10	+10	25	Advance to Quarter-finals
3	Coritiba	11	6	4	1	13	7	+6	22	Advance to Quarter-finals
4	Maringá	11	6	3	2	20	9	+11	21	Advance to Quarter-finals
5	Cianorte	11	5	1	5	14	14	0	16	Advance to Quarter-finals
6	FC Cascavel	11	4	3	4	13	12	+1	15	Advance to Quarter-finals
7	Aruko	11	3	4	4	10	10	0	13	Advance to Quarter-finals
8	São Joseense	11	3	3	5	15	15	0	12	Advance to Quarter-finals
9	Azuriz	11	2	5	4	14	20	−6	11	
10	Londrina	11	2	4	5	9	11	−2	10	
11	Rio Branco (R)	11	1	1	9	3	22	−19	4	Relegation to 2024 Campeonato Paranaense - Segunda Divisão
12	Foz do Iguaçu (R)	11	1	0	10	7	27	−20	3	Relegation to 2024 Campeonato Paranaense - Segunda Divisão

Source: FPF
(R) Relegated

== Final stage ==
=== Bracket ===
Quarter-finals
FC Cascavel	3	0	3
Coritiba	1	0	1
Aruko	1	0	1
Operário Ferroviário	2	3	5
Cianorte	1	0	1
Maringá	0	2	2
São Joseense	2	0	2
Athletico Paranaense	5	4	9

Semi-finals
FC Cascavel (p)	2	0	2 (6)
Operário Ferroviário	1	1	2 (5)
Maringá	0	0	0
Athletico Paranaense	2	1	3

Finals
FC Cascavel	1	0	1
Athletico Paranaense	2	0	2

=== Quarter-finals ===
Team 1	Agg.	Team 2	1st leg	2nd leg
São Joseense	2–9	Athletico Paranaense	2–5	0–4
Aruko	1–5	Operário Ferroviário	1–2	0–3
FC Cascavel	3–1	Coritiba	3–1	0–0
Cianorte	1–2	Maringá	1–0	0–2

==== Group A ====
4 March 2023
16:00

São Joseense	2–5	Athletico Paranaense

Estádio Municipal Cilmar Pedro Goergen, São José dos Pinhais

Athletico Paranaense	4–0	São Joseense

Athletico Paranaense qualified for the semi-finals.

==== Group B ====
5 March 2023
17:00

Aruko	1–2	Operário Ferroviário

Estádio Willie Davids, Maringá

Operário Ferroviário	3–0	Aruko

Operário Ferroviário qualified for the semi-finals.

==== Group C ====
5 March 2023
16:00

FC Cascavel	3–1	Coritiba

Estádio Olímpico Regional Arnaldo Busatto, Cascavel

Coritiba	0–0	FC Cascavel

FC Cascavel qualified for the semi-finals.

==== Group D ====
5 March 2023
19:00

Cianorte	1–0	Maringá

Estádio Municipal Olímpico Albino Turbay, Cianorte

Maringá	2–0	Cianorte

Maringá qualified for the semi-finals.

=== Semi-finals ===
Team 1	Agg.	Team 2	1st leg	2nd leg
Maringá	0–3	Athletico Paranaense	0–2	0–1
FC Cascavel	2–2 (6–5 p)	Operário Ferroviário	2–1	0–1

==== Group E ====
Maringá	0–2	Athletico Paranaense

Athletico Paranaense	1–0	Maringá

Athletico Paranaense qualified for the finals.

==== Group F ====
FC Cascavel	2–1	Operário Ferroviário

Operário Ferroviário	1–0	FC Cascavel
Penalties
	5–6

FC Cascavel qualified for the finals.

=== Finals ===
Team 1	Agg.	Team 2	1st leg	2nd leg
FC Cascavel	1–2	Athletico Paranaense	1–2	0–0

==== Group G ====
1 April 2023
18:00

FC Cascavel	1–2	Athletico Paranaense
Lucas Batatinha 71'	Report	Erick 73'; Vitor Roque 90+11' (pen.)

Estádio Olímpico Regional Arnaldo Busatto, Cascavel
Attendance: 24,957
Referee: Rodolpho Toski Marques

FC Cascavel	Athletico Paranaense

GK	1	(Brazil) André Luiz
DF	2	(Brazil) Libano		(substituted off) 76'
DF	23	(Brazil) Rafael Milhorim
DF	4	(Brazil) Willian Gomes (c)
DF	26	(Brazil) Mateus Rodrigues		(substituted off) 87'
MF	5	(Brazil) Jacy	(yellow card) 52'
MF	8	(Brazil) Gama
MF	20	(Brazil) Robinho
FW	18	(Brazil) Wagner Gomes		(substituted off) 76'
FW	9	(Brazil) Lucas Coelho		(substituted off) 59'
FW	31	(Brazil) Gaspar		(substituted off) 59'
Substitutes:
GK	40	(Brazil) Diego Monteiro
DF	3	(Brazil) Ferreira
DF	6	(Brazil) César Morais	(yellow card) 71' (yellow-red card) 90+9'	(substituted in) 87'
DF	21	(Brazil) Léo
MF	7	(Brazil) Ferrugem
MF	10	(Brazil) Adenilson
MF	35	(Brazil) Pedrinho		(substituted in) 76'
FW	11	(Brazil) Lucas Batatinha		(substituted in) 59'
FW	17	(Brazil) Dionas Bruno
FW	19	(Brazil) Renanzinho		(substituted in) 59'
FW	29	(Brazil) Rodrigo Alves		(substituted in) 76'
FW	32	(Brazil) Cavani
Coach:
(Brazil) Luiz Carlos Cruz

GK	1	(Brazil) Bento
DF	2	(Brazil) Khellven
DF	3	(Brazil) Zé Ivaldo	(yellow card) 87'
DF	44	(Brazil) Thiago Heleno (c)
DF	48	(Brazil) Pedrinho
MF	26	(Brazil) Erick	(yellow card) 52' (red card) 81'
MF	5	(Brazil) Fernandinho	(yellow card) 90+7'
MF	8	(Brazil) Vitor Bueno		(substituted off) 77'
FW	10	(Uruguay) David Terans		(substituted off) 69'
FW	92	(Brazil) Pablo		(substituted off) 63'
FW	14	(Uruguay) Agustín Canobbio		(substituted off) 77'
Substitutes:
GK	23	(Brazil) Léo Linck
DF	6	(Brazil) Fernando
DF	22	(Brazil) Madson
DF	34	(Brazil) Pedro Henrique
DF	42	(Brazil) Matheus Felipe
MF	17	(Brazil) Hugo Moura
MF	18	(Brazil) Léo Cittadini
MF	80	(Brazil) Alex Santana		(substituted in) 77'
MF	88	(Brazil) Christian		(substituted in) 77'
FW	28	(Argentina) Tomás Cuello		(substituted in) 69'
FW	35	(Brazil) Rômulo
FW	39	(Brazil) Vitor Roque		(substituted in) 63'
Coach:
(Brazil) Paulo Turra

Assistant referees:
João Fábio Machado Brischiliari
Andrey Luiz de Freitas
Fourth official:
André Ricardo Martins
Fifth official:
Jefferson Cleiton Piva da Silva
Video assistant referee:
Adriano Milczvski
Assistant video assistant referees:
Luciano Roggenbaum

9 April 2023
17:00

Athletico Paranaense	0–0	FC Cascavel
	Report

Arena da Baixada, Curitiba
Attendance: 33,570
Referee: José Mendonça da Silva Júnior

Athletico Paranaense	FC Cascavel

GK	1	(Brazil) Bento
DF	2	(Brazil) Khellven
DF	3	(Brazil) Zé Ivaldo	(yellow card) 55'
DF	44	(Brazil) Thiago Heleno (c)
DF	48	(Brazil) Pedrinho
MF	17	(Brazil) Hugo Moura		(substituted off) 80'
MF	5	(Brazil) Fernandinho	(yellow card) 37'
MF	8	(Brazil) Vitor Bueno		(substituted off) 51'
FW	10	(Uruguay) David Terans		(substituted off) 60'
FW	92	(Brazil) Pablo		(substituted off) 51'
FW	14	(Uruguay) Agustín Canobbio		(substituted off) 80'
Substitutes:
GK	23	(Brazil) Léo Linck
DF	6	(Brazil) Fernando
DF	22	(Brazil) Madson
DF	34	(Brazil) Pedro Henrique
DF	42	(Brazil) Matheus Felipe
MF	18	(Brazil) Léo Cittadini
MF	30	(Ecuador) Bryan García		(substituted in) 80'
MF	80	(Brazil) Alex Santana	(yellow card) 90'	(substituted in) 60'
MF	88	(Brazil) Christian		(substituted in) 80'
FW	28	(Argentina) Tomás Cuello		(substituted in) 51'
FW	35	(Brazil) Rômulo
FW	39	(Brazil) Vitor Roque		(substituted in) 51'
Coach:
(Brazil) Paulo Turra

GK	1	(Brazil) André Luiz
DF	2	(Brazil) Libano		(substituted off) 83'
DF	23	(Brazil) Rafael Milhorim
DF	4	(Brazil) Willian Gomes (c)
DF	26	(Brazil) Mateus Rodrigues
MF	5	(Brazil) Jacy	(yellow card) 90'
MF	8	(Brazil) Gama
MF	20	(Brazil) Robinho
FW	18	(Brazil) Wagner Gomes		(substituted off) 71'
FW	11	(Brazil) Lucas Batatinha		(substituted off) 59'
FW	31	(Brazil) Gaspar	(yellow card) 12'	(substituted off) 46'
Substitutes:
GK	33	(Brazil) Sassá
GK	40	(Brazil) Diego Monteiro
DF	3	(Brazil) Ferreira
MF	7	(Brazil) Ferrugem
MF	35	(Brazil) Pedrinho		(substituted in) 71'
FW	9	(Brazil) Lucas Coelho		(substituted in) 59'
FW	19	(Brazil) Renanzinho		(substituted in) 46'
FW	29	(Brazil) Rodrigo Alves		(substituted in) 83'
FW	32	(Brazil) Cavani
Coach:
(Brazil) Luiz Carlos Cruz

Assistant referees:
Bruno Boschilia
Victor Hugo Imazu dos Santos
Fourth official:
Leonardo Ferreira Lima
Fifth official:
Rafael Trombeta
Video assistant referee:
Rodolpho Toski Marques
Assistant video assistant referees:
Jefferson Cleiton Piva da Silva

== Top goalscorers ==
Rank	Player	Team	Goals
1	(Brazil) Pablo	Athletico Paranaense	8
2	(Brazil) Vinícius Mingotti	Operário Ferroviário	6
3	(Brazil) Luiz Fernando	Cianorte	5
3	(Brazil) Rodrigo Pinho	Coritiba	5
5	(Brazil) Alef Manga	Coritiba	4
5	(Brazil) Anderson Tanque	São Joseense	4
