= João Cruz =

João Cruz may refer to:

- João Cruz (footballer, born 1915) (1915–1981), Portuguese former football forward
- João Cruz (footballer, born 2006), Brazilian football midfielder
