= Leonardo Godoy =

Argentine footballer (born 1995)

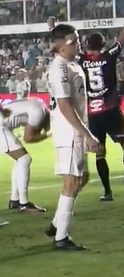
- Godoy playing for Santos in 2025

Personal information
- Full name: Leonardo Ezequiel Godoy
- Date of birth: 28 April 1995 (age 31)
- Place of birth: Concordia, Argentina
- Height: 1.73 m (5 ft 8 in)
- Position: Right-back

Team information
- Current team: Independiente
- Number: 29

Youth career
- Salto Grande
- 2010–2015: Atlético Rafaela

Senior career*
Years	Team	Apps	(Gls)
2015–2016	Atlético Rafaela	26	(1)
2016–2021	Talleres	88	(7)
2020–2021	→ Estudiantes (loan)	49	(3)
2022–2024	Estudiantes	64	(3)
2024–2025	Athletico Paranaense	31	(1)
2025	→ Santos (loan)	16	(1)
2025–	Independiente	21	(0)
- * Club domestic league appearances and goals as of 17:51, 6 June 2026 (UTC)

Leonardo Ezequiel Godoy (born 28 April 1995) is an Argentine footballer who plays as a right-back for Independiente.

== Career ==
=== Early career ===
Born in Concordia, Godoy played as a midfielder for local side Club Salto Grande, and also had a failed trial at Vélez Sarsfield. He later moved to Atlético Rafaela in 2010, where he was converted into a right-back by manager Víctor Bottaniz.

=== Atlético Rafaela ===
After progressing in the youth categories, Godoy made his first team – and Primera División – debut on 10 April 2015, starting in a 1–1 away draw against Crucero del Norte. He immediately became a starter for the side, and scored his first senior goal on 10 August, in a 5–1 Copa Argentina home routing of Deportivo Merlo; he was later sent off in that match.

=== Talleres ===
In July 2016, Godoy was transferred to Talleres de Córdoba, after the club purchased 80% of his economic rights. He became an immediate first-choice for the side, rarely missing a match for the club.

In September 2020, amidst transfer rumours to Estudiantes, Godoy signed a new two-year contract with Talleres.

=== Estudiantes ===
On 16 September 2020, Godoy was loaned to Estudiantes until December 2021, with a buyout clause. On 15 December 2021, the club exercised his clause, purchasing 50% of his economic rights for a fee of US$1 million.

Godoy was a first-choice during his entire spell at the Pincharratas, helping the club to win their first-ever Copa Argentina title in 2023.

=== Athletico Paranaense ===
On 6 January 2024, Godoy was announced at Campeonato Brasileiro Série A side Athletico Paranaense, signing a four-year deal. He shared the starting spot with Madson during the campaign, as the club suffered relegation.

==== Loan to Santos ====
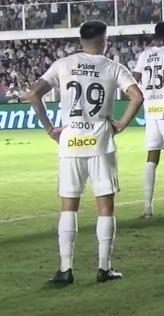
Godoy with Santos in 2025

On 13 January 2025, Santos announced the signing of Godoy on a one-year loan deal, with a buyout clause. He made his club debut three days later, replacing Yeferson Soteldo in a 2–1 Campeonato Paulista home win over Mirassol.

=== Independiente ===
On 17 June 2025, Godoy was presented at Independiente on a three-and-a-half-year contract.

== Career statistics ==
As of 28 May 2025

Club statistics
Club	Season	League			National cup		Continental		State league		Total	
Club	Season	Division	Apps	Goals	Apps	Goals	Apps	Goals	Apps	Goals	Apps	Goals
Atlético Rafaela	2015	Primera División	13	0	2	1	—		—		15	1
Atlético Rafaela	2016	Primera División	11	0	0	0	—		—		11	0
Atlético Rafaela	Total		24	0	2	1	—		—		26	1
Talleres	2016–17	Primera División	28	2	2	0	—		—		30	2
Talleres	2017–18	Primera División	23	0	2	2	—		—		25	2
Talleres	2018–19	Primera División	16	1	2	0	2 (Note: Appearances in the Copa Libertadores)	0	—		20	1
Talleres	2019–20	Primera División	13	2	0	0	—		—		13	2
Talleres	Total		80	5	6	2	2	0	—		88	7
Estudiantes	2020	Primera División	11 (Note: Soccerway counts Copa de la Liga Profesional appearances as league appearances.)	0	0	0	—		—		11	0
Estudiantes	2021	Primera División	38	3	0	0	—		—		38	3
Estudiantes	2022	Primera División	31	1	1	0	13	0	—		45	2
Estudiantes	2023	Primera División	33	1	4	0	10 (Note: Appearances in the Copa Sudamericana)	3	—		28	4
Estudiantes	Total		113	6	5	0	23	3	—		141	11
Athletico Paranaense	2024	Série A	26	1	2	0	9	0	5 (Note: Appearances in the Campeonato Paranaense)	0	42	1
Santos (loan)	2025	Série A	6	0	2	0	—		10 (Note: Appearances in the Campeonato Paulista)	1	18	1
Career total			249	12	17	3	34	3	15	1	315	21

== Honours ==
Estudiantes

- Copa Argentina: 2023

Athletico Paranaense

- Campeonato Paranaense: 2024
