= Julimar =

Brazilian footballer

Personal information
- Full name: Julimar Silva Oliveira Junior
- Date of birth: 25 January 2001 (age 25)
- Place of birth: Nova Ipixuna, Brazil
- Height: 1.88 m (6 ft 2 in)
- Position: Forward

Team information
- Current team: Athletico Paranaense
- Number: 20

Youth career
- Criciúma

Senior career*
Years	Team	Apps	(Gls)
2018–2020	Criciúma	25	(2)
2020	→ Athletico Paranaense (loan)	3	(0)
2020–	Athletico Paranaense	104	(19)
2023	→ Mirassol (loan)	19	(1)
- * Club domestic league appearances and goals as of 12 April 2026

Julimar Silva Oliveira Junior (born 25 January 2001), commonly known as Julimar, is a Brazilian footballer who plays as a forward for Athletico Paranaense.

== Career statistics ==
=== Club ===
As of 28 February 2023.

Club	Season	League			State League		Cup		Continental		Other		Total	
Club	Season	Division	Apps	Goals	Apps	Goals	Apps	Goals	Apps	Goals	Apps	Goals	Apps	Goals
Criciúma	2018	Série B	3	0	0	0	0	0	—		—		3	0
Criciúma	2019	Série B	11	1	11	0	3	1	—		—		25	2
Criciúma	2020	Série C	0	0	0	0	0	0	—		—		0	0
Criciúma	Total		14	1	11	0	3	1	—		—		28	2
Athletico Paranaense	2020	Série A	0	0	3	0	0	0	0	0	0	0	3	0
Athletico Paranaense	2021	Série A	1	0	5	0	0	0	0	0	—		6	0
Athletico Paranaense	2022	Série A	0	0	11	2	0	0	0	0	1 (Note: Appearance(s) in Recopa Sudamericana)	0	12	2
Athletico Paranaense	2023	Série A	0	0	2	0	0	0	0	0	—		2	0
Athletico Paranaense	Total		1	0	21	2	0	0	0	0	1	0	23	2
Career total			15	1	32	2	3	1	0	0	1	0	51	4

== Honours ==
Athletico Paranaense

- Campeonato Paranaense: 2020, 2023
