= Felipinho (footballer, born 2001) =

Brazilian footballer

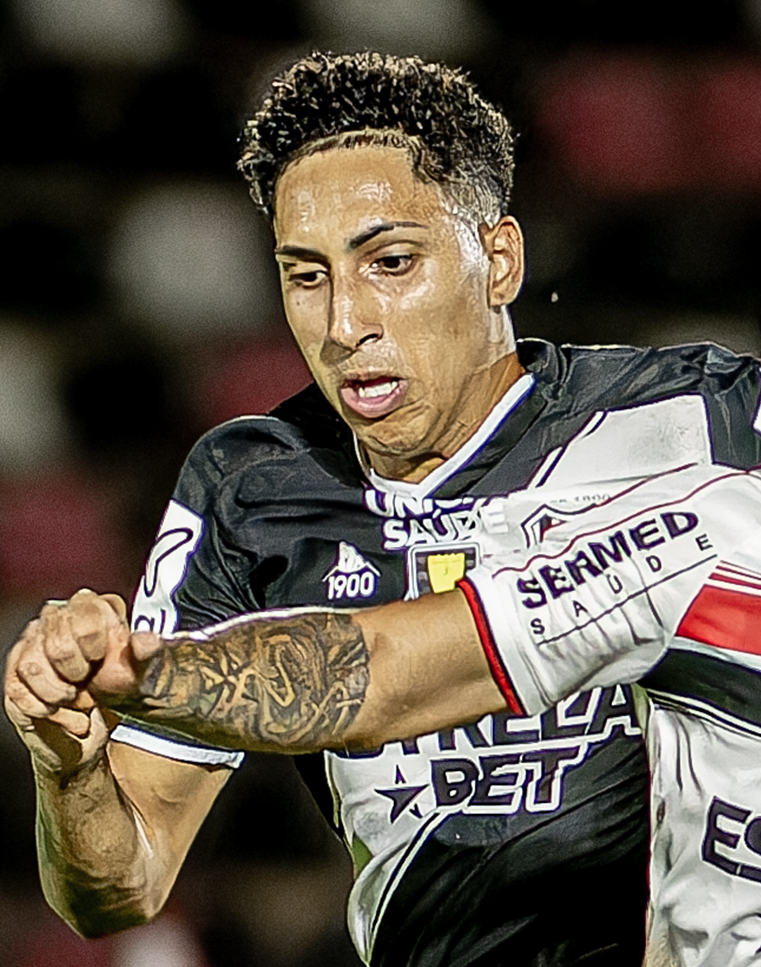
- Felipinho playing for Ponte Preta in 2024

Personal information
- Full name: Antonio Feliphe Costa Silva
- Date of birth: 18 October 2001 (age 25)
- Place of birth: Boa Vista, Brazil
- Height: 1.83 m (6 ft 0 in)
- Position: Defensive midfielder

Team information
- Current team: Athletico Paranaense
- Number: 5

Youth career
- 2009–2015: Extremo Norte
- 2016–2021: São Raimundo-RR
- 2021–2022: Ponte Preta

Senior career*
Years	Team	Apps	(Gls)
2020–2021	São Raimundo-RR	6	(1)
2023–2024	Ponte Preta	43	(2)
2024–	Athletico Paranaense	82	(0)
- * Club domestic league appearances and goals as of 15:32, 10 November 2026 (UTC)

Antonio Feliphe Costa Silva (born 18 October 2001), known as Felipinho, is a Brazilian footballer who plays as a defensive midfielder for Athletico Paranaense.

== Career ==
Felipinho was born in Boa Vista, Roraima, and began his career with hometown side Esporte Clube Extremo Norte. He subsequently moved to São Raimundo-RR, and made his senior debut with the club on 21 October 2020, coming on as a second-half substitute in a 1–0 Série D away loss against River.

Felipinho scored his first senior goal on 23 December 2020, netting his team's third in a 4–1 Campeonato Roraimense away win over GAS, which assured his team's state league title. In March of the following year, he moved to Ponte Preta and returned to youth football.

Promoted to the first team of Ponte for the 2023 season, Felipinho made his first team debut for the side on 15 February of that year, playing the last five minutes in a 2–0 Campeonato Paulista Série A2 away win over Linense. After being a backup option during the Paulista Série A2 title, he established himself as a starter during the 2023 Série B, and scored his first professional goal on 3 May in a 2–0 home win over Botafogo-SP.

On 14 February 2024, Felipinho was announced at Série A side Athletico Paranaense on a four-year contract.

== Career statistics ==
As of 10 November 2026

Club	Season	League			State League		Cup		Continental		Other		Total	
Club	Season	Division	Apps	Goals	Apps	Goals	Apps	Goals	Apps	Goals	Apps	Goals	Apps	Goals
São Raimundo-RR	2020	Série D	3	0	3	1	—		—		1 (Note: Appearance(s) in Copa Verde)	0	7	1
Ponte Preta	2023	Série B	30	1	7	0	1	0	—		—		38	1
Ponte Preta	2024	Série B	0	0	6	1	—		—		—		6	1
Ponte Preta	Total		30	1	13	1	1	0	—		—		44	2
Athletico Paranaense	2024	Série A	18	0	7	0	2	0	4 (Note: Appearance(s) in Copa Sudamericana)	1	—		31	1
Athletico Paranaense	2025	Série B	31	0	13	0	6	0	—		—		50	0
Athletico Paranaense	2026	Série A	11	0	2	0	1	0	—		—		14	0
Athletico Paranaense	Total		60	0	22	0	9	0	4	1	—		95	1
Career total			93	1	38	2	10	0	4	1	1	0	146	4

== Honours ==
São Raimundo-RR

- Campeonato Roraimense: 2020

Ponte Preta

- Campeonato Paulista Série A2: 2023
