= Lucas Belezi =

Brazilian footballer

Personal information
- Full name: Lucas Belezi Barbosa
- Date of birth: 8 May 2003 (age 23)
- Place of birth: São Paulo, Brazil
- Height: 1.86 m (6 ft 1 in)
- Position: Centre-back

Team information
- Current team: Athletic

Youth career
- 2014–2016: Corinthians
- 2017: Juventus-SP
- 2018–2022: Corinthians
- 2023: Athletico Paranaense

Senior career*
| Years | Team | Apps | (Gls) |
| 2023–2026 | Athletico Paranaense | 45 | (2) |
| 2026– | Athletic | 35 | (1) |

International career
| 2019 | Brazil U16 | 2 | (0) |
- * Club domestic league appearances and goals as of 18 November 2026

Lucas Belezi Barbosa (born 8 May 2003) is a Brazilian footballer who plays as a centre-back for Athletic.

== Club career ==
Born in São Paulo, Belezi joined Corinthians' youth setup at the age of ten, but was released by the club three years later. He returned to the club after a one-year spell at Juventus, and became the youngest player to feature with the first team in a friendly against Botafogo-SP in June 2019.

On 13 March 2020, Belezi signed his first professional contract with Timão, running until the end of 2022. In November 2022, he announced his departure from the club, after failing to agree new terms.

In May 2023, Belezi agreed to a deal with Athletico Paranaense, being initially assigned to the under-20 team; Corinthians later reached an agreement to keep 30% of his economic rights. He made his professional – and Série A – debut with Furacão on 7 December, coming on as a half-time substitute for Matheus Felipe in a 3–0 away loss to Cuiabá.

== Career statistics ==
As of 23 October 2024

| Club | Season | League | | | State League | | Cup | | Continental | | Other | | Total | |
| Club | Season | Division | Apps | Goals | Apps | Goals | Apps | Goals | Apps | Goals | Apps | Goals | Apps | Goals |
|---|---|---|---|---|---|---|---|---|---|---|---|---|---|---|
| Athletico Paranaense | 2023 | Série A | 1 | 0 | — | | 0 | 0 | — | | — | | 1 | 0 |
| Athletico Paranaense | 2024 | Série A | 2 | 0 | 4 | 0 | 0 | 0 | 0 | 0 | — | | 6 | 0 |
| Total | | | 3 | 0 | 4 | 0 | 0 | 0 | 0 | 0 | 0 | 0 | 7 | 0 |
