= Léo Linck =

Brazilian footballer

Personal information
- Full name: Leonardo Matias Baiersdorf Linck
- Date of birth: 3 March 2001 (age 25)
- Place of birth: Marechal Cândido Rondon, Brazil
- Height: 1.95 m (6 ft 5 in)
- Position: Goalkeeper

Team information
- Current team: Estrela da Amadora (on loan from Botafogo)
- Number: 24

Youth career
- 2015–2021: Athletico Paranaense

Senior career*
Years	Team	Apps	(Gls)
2022–2024	Athletico Paranaense	26	(0)
2025–	Botafogo	22	(0)
- * Club domestic league appearances and goals as of 8 April 2026

Leonardo Matias Baiersdorf Linck (born 3 March 2001), known as Léo Linck, is a Brazilian footballer who plays as a goalkeeper for Primeira Liga club Estrela da Amadora, on loan from Campeonato Brasileiro Série A club Botafogo.

== Club career ==
=== Athletico Paranaense ===
Born in Marechal Cândido Rondon but raised in Toledo, both in the Paraná state, Linck joined Athletico Paranaense's youth setup in March 2015, from Craques do Futuro, a team based in Foz do Iguaçu. On 26 May 2021, he renewed his contract until December 2024.

Promoted to the under-23 team ahead of the 2022 season, Linck made his professional debut on 6 March 2022, starting in a 4–3 Campeonato Paranaense away win over FC Cascavel, as Anderson was suspended.

=== Botafogo ===
At the beginning of 2025, Linck was hired by Botafogo to fill the goalkeeper vacancy left after the departure of Paraguayan goalkeeper Gatito Fernández, who had left the club at the end of 2024.

==== Loan to Estrela da Amadora ====
On 21 July 2026, he joined Portuguese Primeira Liga club Estrela da Amadora, on loan for the 2026–27 season.

== Career statistics ==
As of 7 November 2023

Club	Season	League			State League		Cup		Continental		Other		Total	
Club	Season	Division	Apps	Goals	Apps	Goals	Apps	Goals	Apps	Goals	Apps	Goals	Apps	Goals
Athletico Paranaense	2022	Série A	0	0	1	0	0	0	0	0	0	0	1	0
Athletico Paranaense	2023	Série A	5	0	2	0	0	0	0	0	—		7	0
Total			5	0	3	0	0	0	0	0	0	0	8	0

== Honours ==
Athletico Paranaense

- Copa Sudamericana: 2021
- Campeonato Paranaense: 2023
