= Bruno Zapelli =

Association football player (born 2002)

Personal information
- Date of birth: 16 May 2002 (age 24)
- Place of birth: Carlos Paz, Córdoba, Argentina
- Height: 1.81 m (5 ft 11 in)
- Position: Midfielder

Team information
- Current team: Athletico Paranaense
- Number: 10

Youth career
- 2013–2016: Villarreal
- 2016–2020: Belgrano

Senior career*
Years	Team	Apps	(Gls)
2020–2023	Belgrano	94	(4)
2023–	Athletico Paranaense	138	(10)

International career^{‡}
2023	Italy U21	1	(0)
2023	Argentina U23	3	(1)
- * Club domestic league appearances and goals as of 15:57, 10 November 2026 (UTC) ‡ National team caps and goals as of 16:00, 10 November 2026 (UTC)

Bruno Zapelli (born 16 May 2002) is an Argentine professional footballer currently playing as a midfielder for Brazilian club Athletico Paranaense.

== Club career ==
Born in Carlos Paz, Córdoba, Zapelli was spotted at the age of eleven by Spanish side Villarreal while trialling in Rosario. After almost three years in Spain, he returned to Argentina and trialled with Boca Juniors. However, when the club could not provide a place for him to stay, he returned to Córdoba to join Belgrano.

In 2022, Zapelli was subject to a $2,000,000 bid from Italian club Modena, which was rejected by Belgrano.

== International career ==
Born in Argentina, Zapelli is of Italian descent and holds both citizenships. He was called up to the Italy U21s in March 2023, but was called up to the Argentina national team in August, and played for their under-23 team in November.

== Career statistics ==
As of 10 November 2026

Club	Season	League			National cup (Note: Includes Copa Argentina, Copa do Brasil)		Continental		State league (Note: Includes Campeonato Paranaense)		Total	
Club	Season	Division	Apps	Goals	Apps	Goals	Apps	Goals	Apps	Goals	Apps	Goals
Belgrano	2020–21	Primera Nacional	5	0	0	0	—		—		5	0
Belgrano	2021	Primera Nacional	28	1	0	0	—		—		28	1
Belgrano	2022	Primera Nacional	36	2	1	0	—		—		37	2
Belgrano	2023	Primera Nacional	24	1	0	0	—		—		24	1
Belgrano	Total		93	4	1	0	—		—		94	4
Athletico Paranaense	2023	Série A	21	2	—		—		—		21	2
Athletico Paranaense	2024	Série A	32	0	6	2	10 (Note: Appearance(s) in Copa Sudamericana)	1	12	2	60	5
Athletico Paranaense	2025	Série B	35	5	8	0	—		12	0	55	5
Athletico Paranaense	2026	Série A	23	0	4	0	—		3	1	30	1
Athletico Paranaense	Total		111	7	18	2	10	1	27	3	166	13
Career total			204	11	19	2	10	1	27	3	260	17
