= Fernando (footballer, born September 1999) =

Brazilian footballer

Personal information
- Full name: Fernando Augusto Pereira Bueno Júnior
- Date of birth: 14 September 1999 (age 27)
- Place of birth: Santa Maria, Brazil
- Height: 1.81 m (5 ft 11 in)
- Position: Left back

Team information
- Current team: Chapecoense
- Number: 12

Youth career
- 2008–2014: Novo Horizonte
- 2015: Barra-SC
- 2015–2017: Novo Horizonte
- 2018: Mirassol
- 2018: Ferroviária
- 2018: Chapecoense

Senior career*
Years	Team	Apps	(Gls)
2017	Inter de Santa Maria	9	(0)
2020–2022	Chapecoense	47	(1)
2020	→ São Luiz (loan)	12	(0)
2021	→ Marcílio Dias (loan)	23	(0)
2023–2025	Athletico Paranaense	50	(0)
2026	Ceará	22	(0)
2026–	Chapecoense	1	(0)
- * Club domestic league appearances and goals as of 15 April 2026

Fernando Augusto Pereira Bueno Júnior (born 14 September 1999), simply known as Fernando, is a Brazilian footballer who plays as a left back for Chapecoense.

== Club career ==
Born in Santa Maria, Rio Grande do Sul, Fernando began his career at hometown side SE Novo Horizonte, and also played for a short period at the youth sides of Barra-SC. In 2017, he was included as a part of the Inter de Santa Maria squad for the year's Campeonato Gaúcho Série A2, and made his senior debut in the competition.

In 2018, after short periods at Mirassol and Ferroviária, Fernando joined Chapecoense's youth categories. On 28 November 2019, after finishing his formation, he was loaned to São Luiz for the upcoming season.

On 21 January 2021, Fernando moved to Marcílio Dias also on loan. His loan was extended on 28 May, and ended the year as a starter.

Fernando returned to Chape for the 2022 campaign, and was assigned in the main squad. A first-choice, he impressed during the year, scoring once in 48 appearances overall.

On 15 January 2023, Série A side Athletico Paranaense announced the signing of Fernando, who signed a four-year deal.

== Career statistics ==
As of 28 February 2023

Club	Season	League			State League		Cup		Continental		Other		Total	
Club	Season	Division	Apps	Goals	Apps	Goals	Apps	Goals	Apps	Goals	Apps	Goals	Apps	Goals
Inter de Santa Maria	2017	Gaúcho Série A2	—		9	1	—		—		—		9	1
São Luiz	2020	Série D	11	0	1	0	0	0	—		—		12	0
Marcílio Dias	2020	Série D	0	0	—		—		—		2 (Note: Appearance(s) in Copa Santa Catarina)	0	2	0
Marcílio Dias	2021	Série D	14	0	9	0	—		—		9	0	32	0
Marcílio Dias	Total		14	0	9	0	—		—		11	0	34	0
Chapecoense	2022	Série B	36	0	11	1	1	0	—		—		48	1
Athletico Paranaense	2023	Série A	0	0	2	0	0	0	0	0	0	0	2	0
Career total			61	0	32	2	1	0	0	0	11	0	105	2

== Honours ==
Athletico Paranaense

- Campeonato Paranaense: 2023
