= Gilmar Iser =

Brazilian footballer and manager (born 1964)

Personal information
- Full name: Gilmar Miguel Iser
- Date of birth: 28 August 1964 (age 62)
- Place of birth: Vera Cruz, Rio Grande do Sul, Brazil
- Position: Defender

Senior career*
Years	Team	Apps	(Gls)
1983–1986	Santa Cruz-RS		
1986	Lajeadense		
1987–1988	Santa Cruz-RS		
1988	Santo André		
1989–1990	Caxias		
1991	Guarani-VA		
1992	Internacional		
1992–1993	Marítimo		
1994	Guarani-VA		
1995	Brasil de Pelotas		
1996	Santa Cruz-RS		
1997	Lajeadense		

Managerial career
- 1998: Lajeadense
- 1999: São José-RS
- 2000: Pelotas
- 2000: Avenida
- 2001: Cachoeira
- 2002: Avenida
- 2003: Lajeadense
- 2004: Avenida
- 2005–2006: Novo Hamburgo
- 2006–2007: Joinville
- 2007: Glória
- 2007–2009: Esportivo
- 2009: Juventude
- 2009: Caxias
- 2010: Novo Hamburgo
- 2010: América de Natal
- 2010: Brasil de Pelotas
- 2010–2011: Novo Hamburgo
- 2011: River Plate
- 2012: Avenida
- 2012–2013: Novo Hamburgo
- * Club domestic league appearances and goals

Gilmar Miguel Iser (born 28 August 1964) is a retired Brazilian professional football player, who played as defender and currently a manager.

== Career as a player ==
Began his professional career in the Santa Cruz-RS in 1983. Later he played for the teams: Lajeadense, Santo André, Caxias, Guarani-VA, Internacional, Marítimo and Brasil de Pelotas, where he finished his career in 1997.

== Career as a manager ==
Since 1998 he coached the Lajeadense, São José-RS, Pelotas, Avenida, Cachoeira, Novo Hamburgo, Joinville, Glória, Esportivo, Juventude, Caxias, América de Natal, Brasil de Pelotas and River Plate.

== Titles ==
Cachoeira

- Campeonato Gaúcho Série B: 2001

Novo Hamburgo

- Copa FGF: 2005
- Copa Emídio Perondi: 2005

Joinville

- Campeonato Catarinense Série B: 2007
