= Lucas Esquivel =

Argentine footballer

Personal information
- Full name: Lucas Ángel Esquivel
- Date of birth: 14 October 2001 (age 25)
- Place of birth: Santa Fe, Argentina
- Height: 1.83 m (6 ft 0 in)
- Position: Left-back

Team information
- Current team: Athletico Paranaense
- Number: 37

Youth career
- 2014–2017: Pucará
- 2017–2020: Unión Santa Fe

Senior career*
Years	Team	Apps	(Gls)
2020–2023	Unión Santa Fe	49	(1)
2023–	Athletico Paranaense	105	(3)
- * Club domestic league appearances and goals as of 7 April 2026

Lucas Ángel Esquivel (born 14 October 2001) is an Argentine professional footballer who plays as a left-back for Brazilian club Athletico Paranaense.

== Career ==
=== Unión Santa Fe ===
Born in Santa Fe, Esquivel played for local side Club Pucará before joining Unión de Santa Fe's youth sides at the age of 15. He was promoted to the first team in October, and signed his first professional contract until the end of 2022 on the 28th.

After being an unused substitute in a 1–0 Copa Sudamericana home defeat to Emelec on 29 October 2020, Esquivel made his senior debut on 1 November, starting in a 0–0 Copa de la Liga Profesional home draw against Arsenal de Sarandí; he played seventy-three minutes before being subbed off for Claudio Corvalán. He scored his first professional goal on 7 August 2021, netting his team's third in a 4–0 home routing of San Lorenzo.

=== Athletico Paranaense ===
On 31 May 2023, Brazilian Série A club Athletico Paranaense announced the signing of Esquivel on a five-year contract.

== Personal life ==
In September 2020, it was announced that Esquivel had tested positive for COVID-19 amid the pandemic; he isolated after showing symptoms.

== Career statistics ==
As of 10 November 2026.

Appearances and goals by club, season and competition
Club	Season	League			Cup (Note: Includes Copa Argentina, Copa do Brasil)		Continental		State league (Note: Includes Campeonato Paranaense)		Other		Total	
Club	Season	Division	Apps	Goals	Apps	Goals	Apps	Goals	Apps	Goals	Apps	Goals	Apps	Goals
Unión Santa Fe	2020–21	Primera División	3 (Note: Soccerway counts Copa de la Liga Profesional appearances as league appearances.)	0	0	0	1 (Note: Appearance(s) in Copa Sudamericana)	0	—		—		4	0
Unión Santa Fe	2021	Primera División	10	1	0	0	—		—		—		10	1
Unión Santa Fe	2022	Primera División	24	0	1	0	—		—		—		25	0
Unión Santa Fe	2023	Primera División	12	0	1	0	5	0	—		—		18	0
Unión Santa Fe	Total		49	1	2	0	6	0	—		—		57	1
Athletico Paranaense	2023	Série A	19	0	2	0	2 (Note: Appearance(s) in Copa Libertadores)	0	—		—		23	0
Athletico Paranaense	2024	Série A	33	0	6	0	10	2	4	0	—		53	2
Athletico Paranaense	2025	Série B	23	0	3	1	—		0	0	—		26	1
Athletico Paranaense	2026	Série A	24	2	2	0	—		2	1	—		28	3
Athletico Paranaense	Total		99	2	13	1	12	2	6	1	—		130	6
Career total			148	3	15	1	18	2	6	1	0	0	187	7
