= Gaspar (footballer, born 2002) =

Brazilian footballer

Personal information
- Full name: Luis Eduardo Gaspar Coelho
- Date of birth: 31 July 2002 (age 24)
- Place of birth: Várzea Grande, Brazil
- Height: 1.80 m (5 ft 11 in)
- Position: Forward

Team information
- Current team: Avaí
- Number: 20

Youth career
- Atlético Tubarão
- 2019–2022: Avaí

Senior career*
Years	Team	Apps	(Gls)
2022–	Avaí	64	(4)
2023	→ FC Cascavel (loan)	12	(1)
2026	→ Caxias (loan)	16	(0)
- * Club domestic league appearances and goals as of 11 November 2026

Luis Eduardo Gaspar Coelho (born 31 July 2002), commonly known as Gaspar, is a Brazilian footballer who plays as a forward for Avaí.

== Club career ==
Gaspar was born in Várzea Grande, Mato Grosso, and joined Avaí's youth setup in August 2019, from Atlético Tubarão. He made his first team – and Série A – debut on 5 November, coming on as a late substitute for Pablo Dyego in a 1–1 away draw against Santos.

== Career statistics ==
As of 7 November 2022

Club	Season	League			State League		Cup		Continental		Other		Total	
Club	Season	Division	Apps	Goals	Apps	Goals	Apps	Goals	Apps	Goals	Apps	Goals	Apps	Goals
Avaí	2022	Série A	1	0	0	0	0	0	—		—		1	0
Career total			1	0	0	0	0	0	0	0	0	0	1	0

== Honours ==
Avaí

- Campeonato Catarinense: 2025
