= Marechal Cândido Rondon =

Coordinates: 24°34′S 54°04′W

- Municipality
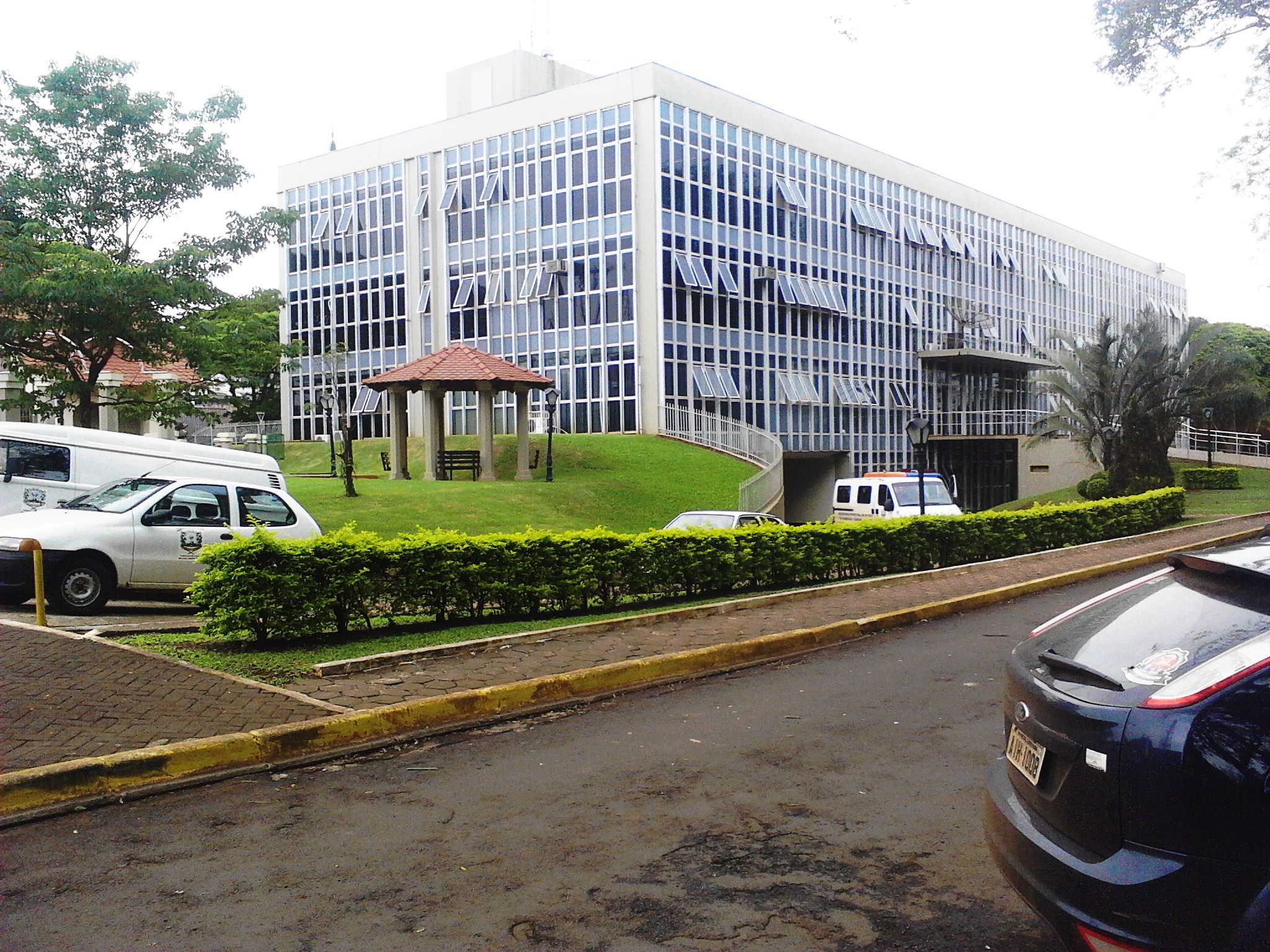

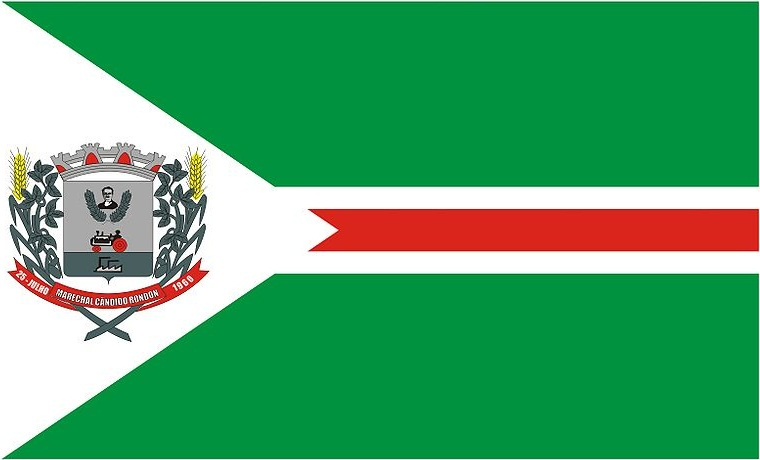
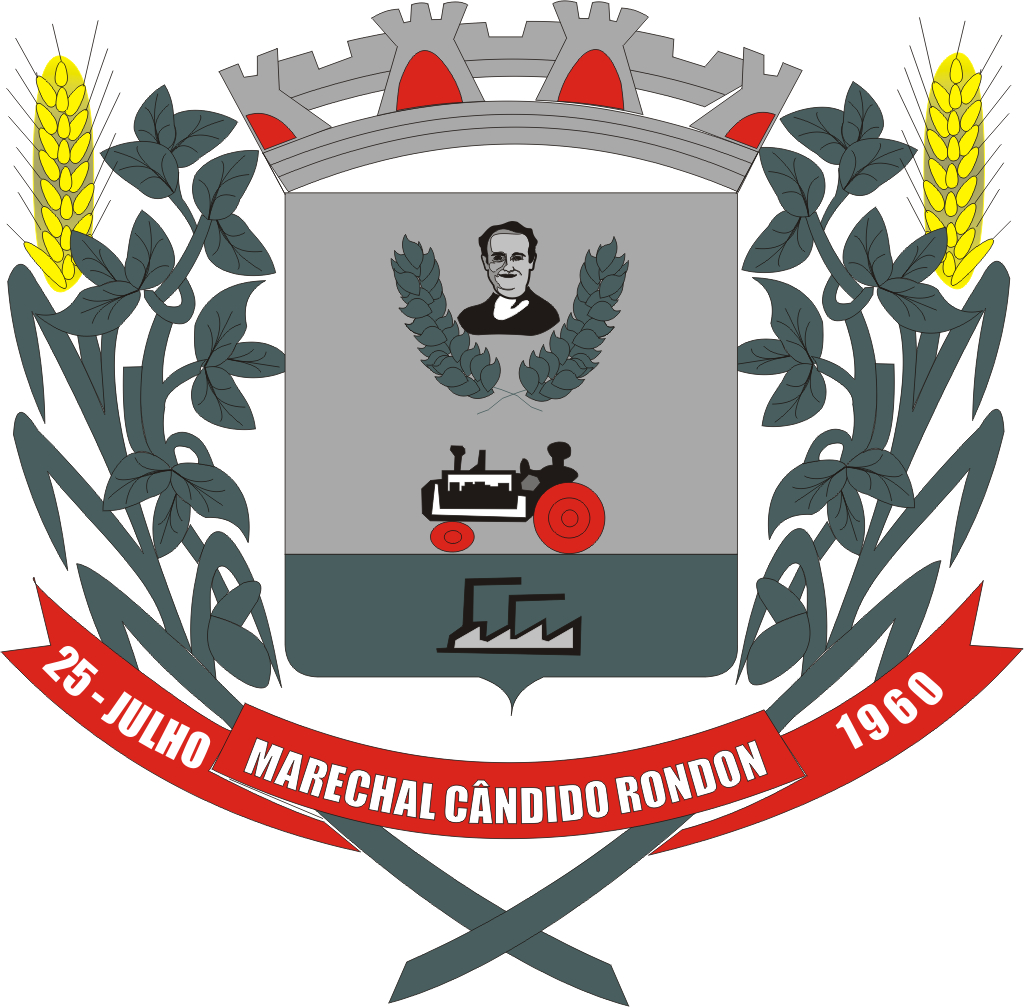
- Flag Coat of arms
- Interactive map of Marechal Cândido Rondon
- Country: Brazil
- Region: Southern
- State: Paraná
- Mesoregion: Oeste Paranaense

Population (2020)
  - Total: 53,495
- Time zone: UTC−3 (BRT)

Marechal Cândido Rondon is a municipality in the state of Paraná in the Southern Region of Brazil. Its population, according to the 2022 Brazilian census, was 55,836.

It has a strong influence of Germanic culture, demonstrated in architecture and Hunsrückisch, a Brazilian German dialect.

== See also ==
- List of municipalities in Paraná
