= Mateus (footballer, born 1999) =

Brazilian footballer

Personal information
- Full name: Mateus Rodrigues dos Santos
- Date of birth: 3 April 1999 (age 27)
- Position: Defender

Team information
- Current team: Vitória
- Number: 21

Youth career
- –2017: Primavera

Senior career*
Years	Team	Apps	(Gls)
2018–	Vitória	1	(0)
2019	→ Internacional (loan)	0	(0)
- * Club domestic league appearances and goals as of 18:02, 4 August 2020 (UTC)

Mateus Rodrigues dos Santos (born 3 April 1999), commonly known as Mateus, is a Brazilian footballer who currently plays as a defender for Vitória.

== Career statistics ==
=== Club ===
As of 4 August 2020.

Club	Season	League			State League		Cup		Continental		Other		Total	
Club	Season	Division	Apps	Goals	Apps	Goals	Apps	Goals	Apps	Goals	Apps	Goals	Apps	Goals
Vitória	2018	Série A	1	0	0	0	0	0	0	0	0	0	1	0
Vitória	2019	Série B	0	0	0	0	0	0	0	0	2 (Note: Appearances in the Copa do Nordeste)	0	2	0
Vitória	Total		1	0	0	0	0	0	0	0	2	0	3	0
Internacional (loan)	2019	Série A	0	0	0	0	0	0	0	0	0	0	0	0
Career total			1	0	0	0	0	0	0	0	2	0	3	0
