= Nikão =

Brazilian footballer (born 1992)

Personal information
- Full name: Maycon Vinícius Ferreira da Cruz
- Date of birth: 29 July 1992 (age 34)
- Place of birth: Montes Claros, Brazil
- Height: 1.74 m (5 ft 9 in)
- Position: Attacking midfielder

Team information
- Current team: Guangdong GZ-Power
- Number: 11

Youth career
- 2003–2010: Mirassol
- 2008–2009: → Palmeiras (loan)
- 2009–2010: → Santos (loan)
- 2010: Atlético Mineiro

Senior career*
Years	Team	Apps	(Gls)
2010–2014	Atlético Mineiro	4	(0)
2011	→ Vitória (loan)	13	(9)
2011	→ Bahia (loan)	7	(0)
2012	→ Ponte Preta (loan)	29	(1)
2013	→ América Mineiro (loan)	34	(5)
2014	→ Linense (loan)	7	(0)
2014	→ Ceará (loan)	28	(4)
2015–2021	Athletico Paranaense	209	(31)
2022–2024	São Paulo	32	(4)
2023	→ Cruzeiro (loan)	29	(4)
2024	→ Athletico Paranaense (loan)	26	(6)
2025–	Guangdong GZ-Power	55	(22)
- * Club domestic league appearances and goals as of 11 October 2026

Maycon Vinicius Ferreira da Cruz (born 29 July 1992), commonly known as Nikão, is a Brazilian professional footballer who plays as an attacking midfielder for Guangdong GZ-Power.

== Personal life ==
Born in Montes Claros, Minas Gerais, Nikão did not know his father and lost his mother due to a cancer at the age of nine. He was raised by his grandmother, and after impressing in a local amateur team at the age of 12, he was brought up to Mirassol, São Paulo for a trial period. At the age of 16, he also lost his grandmother, and two years later, his brother Thiago also died.

== Club career ==
=== Early career ===
Nikão began his career with Mirassol's youth setup, and subsequently had trials at CSKA Moscow and PSV Eindhoven; despite impressing, he was unable to stay at those clubs after not having a legal representative in those countries. In 2009, after a brief period at Palmeiras, he moved to Santos.

=== Atlético Mineiro ===
On 16 April 2010, as Santos did not exercise the buyout clause on his loan contract, Nikão signed for Atlético Mineiro. He made his Série A debut on 10 October, coming on as a second-half substitute for Renan Oliveira in a 0–1 away loss against Internacional.

After appearing rarely, Nikão was loaned to Série B side Vitória on 9 February 2011. He scored nine goals in only 12 appearances in the 2011 Campeonato Baiano, as his side lost the title to Bahia de Feira.

On 25 May 2011, Nikão moved to Bahia in the top tier, on loan until December. He subsequently served another loan deals at Ponte Preta, América Mineiro, Linense and Ceará.

=== Athletico Paranaense ===
On 14 January 2015 Nikão signed a three-year deal with Atlético Paranaense. He made his club debut on 26 February by playing the last 20 minutes of a 0–1 Campeonato Paranaense home loss against Foz do Iguaçu, and scored his first goal on 2 May by netting the third of 5–0 home routing of Nacional-PR.

On 6 June 2017, Nikão played his 100th match for Furacão. On 14 July 2019, he reached his 200th match.

On 10 October 2021, Nikão completed 300 matches for Athletico.

== Career statistics ==
As of match played 11 October 2026

Appearances and goals by club, season and competition
Club	Season	League			State League		Cup		Continental		Other		Total	
Club	Season	Division	Apps	Goals	Apps	Goals	Apps	Goals	Apps	Goals	Apps	Goals	Apps	Goals
Atlético Mineiro	2010	Série A	3	0	0	0	—		2 (Note: Appearance(s) in Copa Sudamericana)	0	—		5	0
Atlético Mineiro	2011	Série A	0	0	0	0	0	0	—		—		0	0
Atlético Mineiro	2012	Série A	0	0	1	0	0	0	—		—		0	0
Atlético Mineiro	2013	Série A	0	0	0	0	0	0	—		—		0	0
Atlético Mineiro	Total		3	0	1	0	0	0	2	0	—		6	0
Vitória (loan)	2011	Série B	1	0	12	9	0	0	—		—		13	9
Bahia (loan)	2011	Série A	7	0	—		—		—		—		7	0
Ponte Preta (loan)	2012	Série A	29	1	—		—		—		—		29	1
América Mineiro (loan)	2013	Série B	29	3	5	2	4	1	—		—		38	6
Linense (loan)	2014	Paulista	—		7	0	—		—		—		7	0
Ceará (loan)	2013	Série B	28	4	—		8	3	—		—		36	7
Athletico Paranaense	2015	Série A	31	4	6	1	1	0	4	1	—		42	6
Athletico Paranaense	2016	Série A	19	1	10	1	3	0	—		4 (Note: Appearance(s) in Primeira Liga)	0	36	2
Athletico Paranaense	2017	Série A	29	2	6	1	2	1	11 (Note: Appearance(s) in Copa Libertadores)	3	—		48	7
Athletico Paranaense	2018	Série A	32	2	0	0	7	0	11	4	—		50	6
Athletico Paranaense	2019	Série A	23	5	0	0	8	1	8	0	3 (Note: Two appearances in Recopa Sudamericana, one appearance in J.League Cup / Copa Sudamericana Championship)	0	42	6
Athletico Paranaense	2020	Série A	26	3	7	6	1	0	3	0	1 (Note: Appearance(s) in Supercopa do Brasil)	0	38	9
Athletico Paranaense	2021	Série A	17	3	3	2	6	0	11	3	—		37	8
Athletico Paranaense	Total		177	20	32	11	28	2	48	11	8	0	293	44
São Paulo	2022	Série A	11	3	12	0	5	0	3	1	—		31	4
São Paulo	2024	Série A	—		5	0	—		—		1	0	6	0
São Paulo	Total		11	3	12	0	10	0	3	1	1	0	37	4
Cruzeiro (loan)	2023	Série A	22	2	7	2	2	0	—		—		31	4
Athletico Paranaense (loan)	2024	Série A	26	6	—		3	0	1	1	—		30	7
Guangdong GZ-Power	2025	China League One	29	10	—		2	0	—		—		31	10
Guangdong GZ-Power	2026	China League One	26	12	—		0	0	—		—		26	12
Guangdong GZ-Power	Total		55	22	—		2	0	—		—		57	22
Career total			388	61	76	24	57	6	54	13	9	0	584	104

== Honours ==
Atlético Mineiro

- Campeonato Mineiro: 2010

Ceará

- Copa do Nordeste: 2015

Athletico Paranaense

- Campeonato Paranaense: 2016, 2020
- Copa Sudamericana: 2018, 2021
- J.League Cup / Copa Sudamericana Championship: 2019
- Copa do Brasil: 2019

São Paulo

- Supercopa do Brasil: 2024

Guangdong GZ-Power

- China League One: 2026
